= 2014 United States Senate election in Virginia =

- November 4, 2014
- Turnout: 41.6% (of registered voters)
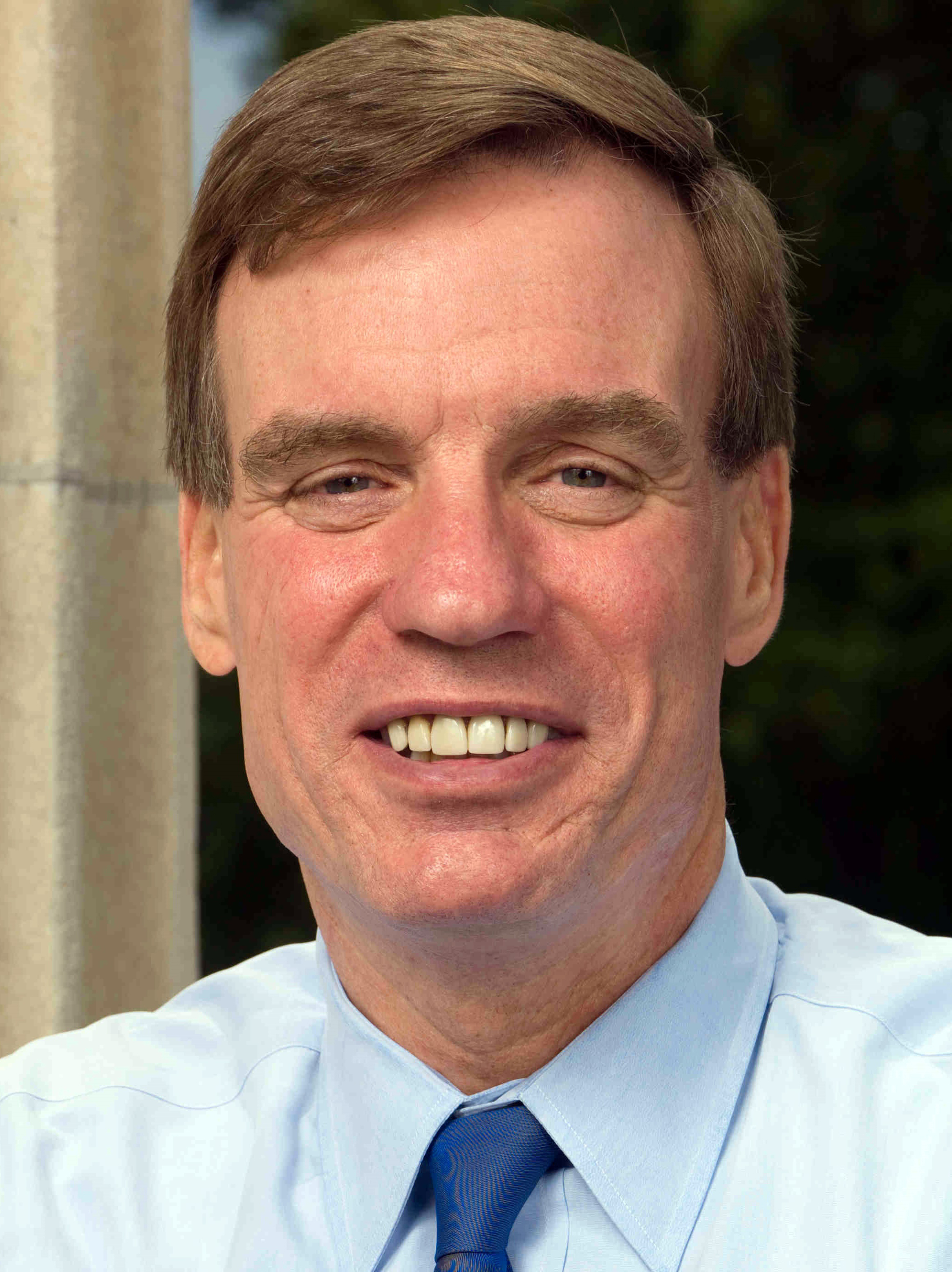

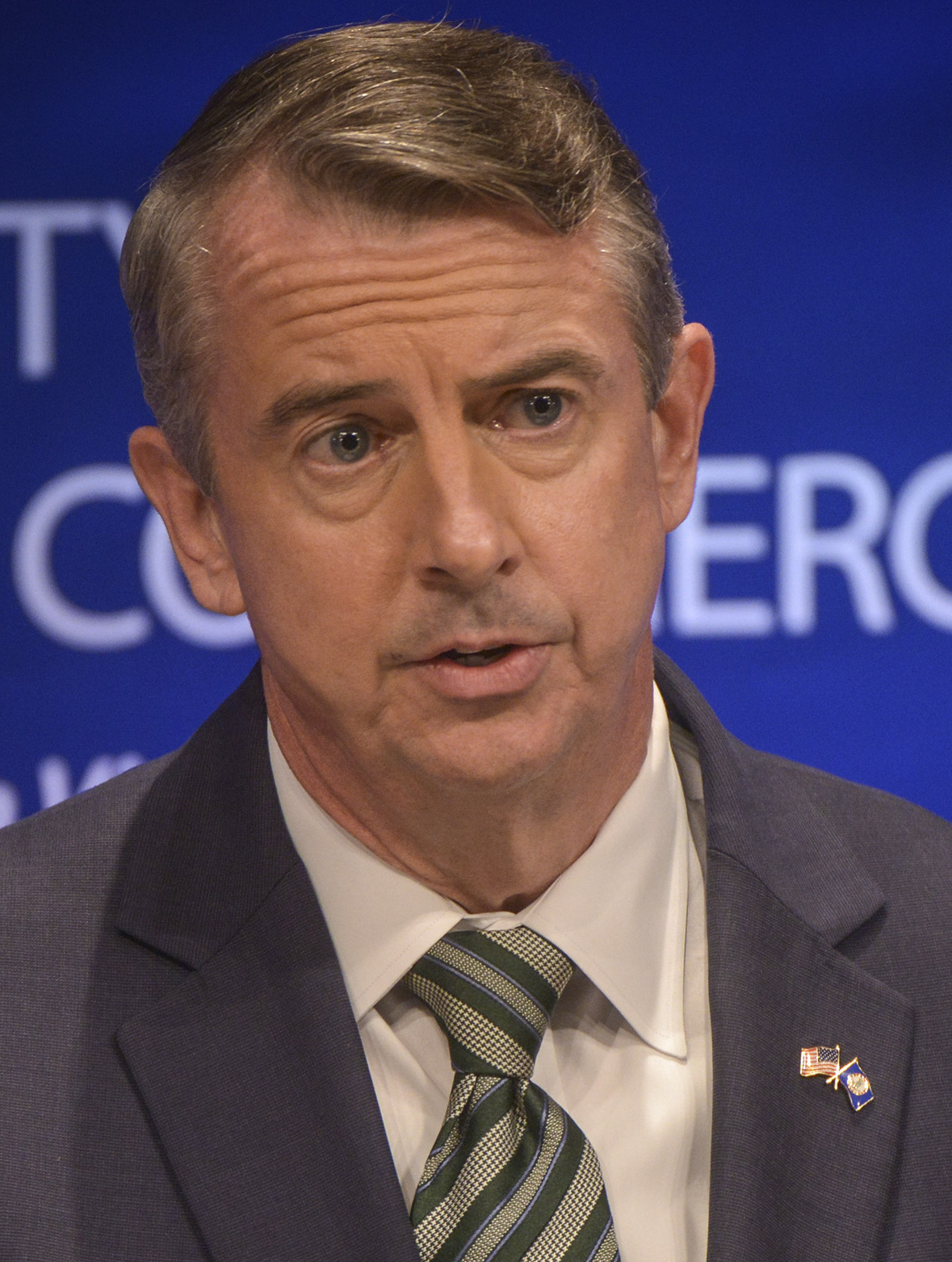
Nominee	Mark Warner	Ed Gillespie
Party	Democratic	Republican
Popular vote	1,073,667	1,055,940
Percentage	49.15%	48.34%
- Warner: 40–50% 50–60% 60–70% 70–80% 80–90% >90% Gillespie: 40–50% 50–60% 60–70% 70–80% 80–90% >90% Tie: 40–50%
U.S. senator before election
Mark Warner
Democratic
Elected U.S. Senator
Mark Warner
Democratic

The 2014 United States Senate election in Virginia was held on November 4, 2014, to elect a member of the United States Senate to represent the Commonwealth of Virginia, concurrently with other elections to the United States Senate, elections to the United States House of Representatives, and various state and local elections.

Incumbent Democratic Senator Mark Warner ran for re-election to a second term. He was unopposed for the Democratic nomination. The Republicans nominated lobbyist and former chairman of the Republican National Committee Ed Gillespie. Also running was Libertarian nominee Robert Sarvis, an attorney and businessman.

Prior to the election, most forecasters considered the race to be uncompetitive and polling showed Warner with a significant lead over Gillespie due to Warner's inherent advantages such as incumbency, name recognition, and fundraising. Despite this, the race was much closer than expected, with Warner narrowly winning by a margin of just 0.8% and 17,727 votes. Gillespie conceded the race on November 7, 2014.

Warner's very narrow margin of victory made this the closest race of the 2014 Senate election cycle. Additionally, it is the last time Loudoun County voted for the Republican candidate in a statewide election, and the last time Alleghany County voted for the Democratic candidate in a statewide election.

== Background ==
Businessman Mark Warner first ran for the U.S. Senate in 1996, losing to incumbent Republican John Warner (no relation), but by a closer than expected margin, 53% to 47%. He then ran for governor of Virginia in 2001, winning with 52% of the vote. After John Warner declined to run for a sixth term in 2008, Mark Warner ran to succeed him. Unopposed in the Democratic primary, he defeated the Republican nominee, fellow former governor Jim Gilmore, in a landslide, 65% to 34%.

Warner was widely expected to run for the Democratic nomination in the 2008 presidential election, but declined to do so, and also declined to be considered as a vice-presidential candidate. He considered running for governor again in 2013 but decided against it, and ran for re-election to a second term. Opinion polls consistently ranked Warner as the most popular elected officials in Virginia, with an approval rating consistently in the mid-60s. This, combined with his large campaign war chest, meant that he was widely dubbed "unbeatable".

== Democratic primary ==
Warner was unopposed for the Democratic nomination.

=== Candidates ===
==== Declared ====
- Mark Warner, incumbent U.S. senator

=== Endorsements ===
Mark Warner

Elected officials

- Brandon Bell, former Republican state senator
- Robert Bloxom, former Republican state delegate and former secretary of agriculture and forestry
- Preston Bryant, former Republican state delegate and former secretary of natural resources
- Vince Callahan, former Republican state delegate
- John Chichester, former Republican state senator and Republican nominee for lieutenant governor in 1985
- Jim Dillard, former Republican state delegate
- Linwood Holton, former Republican governor of Virginia
- Clint Miller, former Republican state delegate and Republican candidate for governor in 1993
- Russ Potts, former Republican state senator and independent candidate for governor in 2005
- Fred Quayle, former Republican state senator
- Ann Rhodes, former Republican state delegate
- Edgar Robb, former Republican state senator and former Albemarle County sheriff
- Jack Rollison, former Republican state delegate
- Bob Tata, former Republican state delegate
- Katherine Waddell, former Republican state delegate
- John Warner, former Republican U.S. senator from Virginia

== Republican convention ==
The Republican Party of Virginia's governing body voted in May 2013 to select its 2014 U.S. Senate nominee at a convention. The convention was held on June 7, 2014, in Roanoke, Virginia.

=== Candidates ===
==== Results ====
Ed Gillespie and Shak Hill were the main players at the convention. A 50% majority was required to receive the nomination; if no candidate achieved such a majority, voting would move to a second or third round. Results of the first ballot of voting were announced as they were finalized by congressional district, and after it became clear that Gillespie was going to win (he had about 60% of the vote with about 90% counted), Hill conceded the race and motioned to nominate Gillespie by acclamation, asking his supporters to support Gillespie. Gillespie was then nominated by acclamation.

==== Declared ====
- Tony DeTora, congressional policy adviser
- Ed Gillespie, lobbyist and former chairman of the Republican National Committee
- Shak Hill, retired Air Force pilot and businessman
- Chuck Moss, businessman

==== Withdrew ====
- Howie Lind, former Navy commander and former chairman of Virginia's 10th congressional district Republican committee

==== Declined ====
- Bill Bolling, former lieutenant governor of Virginia
- Jerry Boykin, retired lieutenant general and executive vice president of the Family Research Council
- Liz Cheney, attorney, political commentator, and daughter of Dick Cheney (ran for senate in Wyoming)
- Ben Cline, state delegate
- Barbara Comstock, state delegate (ran for VA-10)
- Ken Cuccinelli, former attorney general of Virginia and nominee for governor in 2013
- Artur Davis, former Democratic U.S. representative from Alabama
- Michael Farris, founder of Patrick Henry College, the Home School Legal Defense Association and nominee for lieutenant governor in 1993
- Randy Forbes, U.S. representative
- Newt Gingrich, former speaker of the United States House of Representatives and candidate for president of the United States in 2012
- E.W. Jackson, pastor, conservative activist, small business lawyer, Marine Corps Veteran, candidate for the U.S. Senate in 2012 and nominee for lieutenant governor in 2013
- Bob Marshall, state delegate and candidate for the United States Senate in 2008 and 2012
- Bob McDonnell, former governor of Virginia and former attorney general of Virginia (ineligible due to felony convictions for bribery and corruption)
- Jeff McWaters, state senator
- Pete Snyder, technology executive and candidate for lieutenant governor in 2013
- Susan Stimpson, chairwoman of the Stafford County Board of Supervisors

=== Endorsements ===
Ed Gillespie

Individuals

- Al Aitken, chairman of the Culpeper County Republican Committee
- George Allen, former U.S. senator and former governor of Virginia
- Rob Bell, state delegate and candidate for attorney general of Virginia in 2013
- Morton Blackwell, president and founder of the Leadership Institute and Virginia RNC committeeman
- Pam Brown, chair of the Republican Party of Norfolk
- Jim Fisher, Fauquier County commonwealth's attorney
- Mike Ginsberg, chairman of the 8th Congressional District Republican Committee
- Steve Martin, state senator
- Jackson Miller, state delegate
- Mark Obenshain, state senator and nominee for attorney general of Virginia in 2013
- Israel O'Quinn, state delegate
- John Scott, chairman of the Young Republican Federation of Virginia
- Pete Snyder, technology executive and candidate for lieutenant governor in 2013
- Kathy Hayden Terry, Virginia RNC committeewoman
- Terry Wear, chairman of the 11th Congressional District Republican Committee
- John Whitbeck, chairman of the 10th Congressional District Republican Committee
Shak Hill

Individuals

- Jerry Boykin, retired lieutenant general and executive vice president of the Family Research Council
- Alan Keyes, former assistant secretary of state, former candidate for US president, former candidate for US Senate

Organizations

- Club for Growth
- Concerned Veterans for Americans
- Family Research Council
- Gun Owners of America
- Heritage Action

== Libertarian convention ==
The Libertarian Party of Virginia held its convention on February 8, 2014. The delegates at the convention nominated Robert Sarvis as the party's candidate for the U.S. Senate. Sarvis received notification from the Virginia State Board of Elections that he had achieved statewide ballot access on June 26, 2014.

=== Candidates ===
==== Declared ====
- Robert Sarvis, attorney, businessman and nominee for governor in 2013

=== Endorsements ===
Robert Sarvis

Elected officials

- Gary Johnson, former governor of New Mexico and Libertarian Party presidential nominee in 2012

Individuals

- Caleb Coulter, representative at the 2012 Republican National Convention, candidate for the state house in 2012 and former member of the Roanoke City Republican Committee
- Robert Shannon, founder and former chairman of the Mechanicsville and King William TEA Party groups

Organizations

- Our America PAC
- The Virginia Liberty Party

== Write-in ==
=== Candidates ===
==== Declared ====
- Brad Froman (write-in), businessman

== General election ==
=== Fundraising ===
==== Top contributors ====
According to OpenSecrets.org, Democrat Mark Warner's top five contributors were JPMorgan Chase, Dominion Resources, Altria Group, Norfolk Southern, and The Blackstone Group. Republican Ed Gillespie's top five contributors were BlueCross/BlueShield, BGR Group, The Blackstone Group, Jennmar Corporation, and the Altria Group. Thus, Warner and Gillespie shared the Altria Group and the Blackstone Group as top five contributors. Libertarian Robert Sarvis was primarily funded through self-financing and individual contributions.

==== Third quarter reports ====
After third quarter reports, the last before the election, Warner raised an additional $2 million. Gillespie pulled various television ads, stating "he [did] not have the financial resources" to match Warner.

==== Outside spending ====
In the debates, Warner said, "I think we ought to get rid of all Super PACs and all outside money." However, throughout the campaign, Super PACs supported Warner while no comparable Super PAC backed Gillespie. According to the Virginia Public Access Project, as of October 23, outside groups had spent $2,571,319 to influence the election.

==== Campaign finance reports ====
Campaign Finance Reports through December 31
Candidate	Raised	Spent	Cash on hand
Mark Warner	$17,098,544	$18,105,322	$143,390
Ed Gillespie	$7,892,202	$7,873,079	$19,123
Robert Sarvis	$82,813	$84,949	$-2,136
Source: OpenSecrets

==== Cost per vote ====
Warner spent $18,105,322 for the election and received 1,073,667 votes at $16.86 per vote. Gillespie spent $7,873,079 during the campaign and received 1,055,940 votes at $7.46 per vote. Sarvis spent $84,949 and received 53,102 votes at $1.60 per vote.

=== Debates and forums ===
Democrat Mark Warner and Republican Ed Gillespie agreed to three debates and six forums. Gillespie also agreed to three additional debates, but Warner declined. Libertarian Robert Sarvis, who submitted a petition with over 1,000 signatures to debate organizers, challenged Warner and Gillespie to include him in the debates. In August, Warner accepted the challenge and requested that Sarvis be invited to the remaining debates; Gillespie did not respond. In the end, Sarvis was not invited to any of the debates, and was only invited to one joint appearance.

==== Confirmed debates ====
Virginia Bar Association
The Virginia Bar Association (VBA) debate occurred at 11 a.m. on July 26 at The Greenbrier in White Sulphur Springs, West Virginia. PBS NewsHour co-anchor Judy Woodruff moderated the debate, which was free and open to public. The VBA decided to invite only Warner and Gillespie. VBA president John L. Walker III said: "They are the only candidates who qualify under our criteria for invitations." In response to not being invited, Sarvis said, "Virginia voters lost". In addition, some political observers, like the Franklin Center for Government and Public Integrity's project watchdog.org, noted that issues like surveillance and cronyism were missing from the debate. Fewer than 800 people watched the debate on PBS' livestream, which was characterised by Politico as civil, with both candidates "at their best". The debate was later replayed multiple times on C-SPAN.

- Complete video of debate

Fairfax Chamber of Commerce
The Fairfax County Chamber of Commerce hosted a debate on October 7. The debate was moderated by Chuck Todd, the host of Meet the Press. The debate was broadcast live on WRC-TV in Northern Virginia, and was offered to all NBC affiliates in Virginia. In their second debate, Warner and Gillespie aired their differences on marriage equality, the Affordable Care Act, and America's foreign policy challenges. Both candidates appeared uncomfortable at times. Gillespie lashed out against Warner for voting with President Barack Obama "97 percent of the time"; Warner fired back, calling it a "bogus charge". Sarvis was not invited.

- Complete video of debate

The People's Debate
The League of Women Voters of Virginia and American Association of Retired Persons of Virginia hosted "The People's Debate" on October 13 in Richmond, Virginia. The debate was offered by WTVR-TV (CBS) and WCVE-TV (Virginia Public Television) to all of their affiliates. In the third and final debate, the candidates discussed the economy, education, Social Security, healthcare, and campaign finance reform. The debate was heated at times, particularly when Warner spoke against Gillespie's past lobbying experience; Gillespie focused on Warner's recent admission that he called State Senator Phillip Puckett and spoke about jobs for Puckett's daughter. Sarvis was not invited to the debate. Sarvis described the debate as the "no people's debate" because he was "the only candidate not bought and paid for by corporate interests."

==== Confirmed forums ====
Arlington Civic Federation
The Arlington County Civic Federation hosted a forum at 7:30pm on September 2 at Virginia Hospital Center's Hazel Auditorium in Arlington, Virginia. The event was recorded and televised by Arlington Independent Media. More than one hundred people attended the Arlington forum. Sarvis participated in the event; Warner and Gillespie declined.

Northern Virginia Technology Council
The Northern Virginia Technology Council and Microsoft co-hosted a forum, at the Microsoft Offices in Reston, Virginia, from 8 a.m. to 10:30 a.m. on September 8. The forum delved into details about cybersecurity policy, immigration visas for skilled workers and other issues important to the tech community. Warner and Gillespie participated; Sarvis was not invited.

The Battleground
The Battleground Forum with Northern Virginia Chambers of Commerce occurred between 11 a.m. and 2 p.m. on September 19 at the Center for Innovative Technology in Herndon, Virginia. The debate-style forum was hosted by chambers of commerce from Loudoun, Prince William, Reston and Fredericksburg. Questions included the Affordable Care Act, balancing the budget, the Marketplace Fairness Act, Virginia's economy and student loan debt. Warner's and Gillespie's answers centered around two themes: Warner speaking about his bipartisanship record and Gillespie pairing Warner with President Barack Obama. Sarvis was not invited.

Roanoke Chamber of Commerce
The Roanoke Chamber of Commerce joint appearance occurred between 11:30 a.m. and 1:00 p.m., at the City Market Building in Roanoke, Virginia, on October 6. The forum was moderated by Dr. Robert "Bob" Denton, who leads the communication department at Virginia Tech. Warner, Gillespie, and Sarvis were invited. Warner highlighted his record of bipartisanship; Gillespie questioned whether Warner is really the centrist he claims to be; and Sarvis argued the two-party system is broken and neither of his opponents offers any meaningful change. The forum covered a variety of issues, including transportation funding, immigration reform and foreign policy, and a question about the Affordable Care Act highlighted the candidates' differences.

Sorensen Institute
The Sorensen Institute for Political Leadership, Danville Register & Bee, and WSET-TV joint appearance occurred October 14 at 7 p.m. in Danville, Virginia. Warner and Gillespie participated. Sarvis was not invited.

Christopher Newport University
The Christopher Newport University joint appearance took place on October 17 in Gaines Theater in Hampton Roads, Virginia. Warner and Gillespie answered questions from Dr. Quentin Kidd, a government professor and director of Christopher Newport University's Wason Center. The event was free and open to the public. Warner and Gillespie attended. Sarvis was not invited.

Central Business District Association
The Central Business District Association joint appearance was at the Westin Virginia Beach Town Center, from 8:00 a.m. to 9:30 a.m. on October 23. Warner and Gillespie participated. Sarvis was not invited.

==== Proposed debates ====
Proposed debates

James Madison University debate
The proposed debate was sponsored by Virginia21 and the JMU Student Government Association. Gillespie accepted the debate invitation; Warner declined. Sarvis was not invited to the debate. A representative of the university's student government association wrote: "Both campaigns had stated that if Mr. Sarvis were to be invited to participate in the debate their chances of agreeing to accept the invitation was unlikely and actually committing was even less likely." While the debate was not agreed to, Warner and Sarvis spoke with JMU students on August 31.

University of Mary Washington debate
The proposed debate was sponsored by the UMW Student Government Association, the Fredericksburg Regional Chamber of Commerce, and The Free-Lance Star. Sarvis was invited and accepted the debate invitation; Warner and Gillespie declined.

University of Virginia debate
The proposed debate was sponsored by the University of Virginia's Frank Batten School of Leadership and Public Policy. Gillespie accepted the invitation. Warner declined. Sarvis was not invited.

George Mason University debate

Gillespie accepted an invitation to debate at George Mason University; Warner declined.

=== Predictions ===
Source	Ranking	As of
The Cook Political Report	Likely D	November 3, 2014
Sabato's Crystal Ball	Likely D	November 3, 2014
Rothenberg Political Report	Likely D	November 3, 2014
Real Clear Politics	Lean D	November 3, 2014

=== Polling ===
Poll source	Date(s) administered	Sample size	Margin of error	Mark Warner (D)	Ed Gillespie (R)	Robert Sarvis (L)	Other	Undecided
Roanoke College	January 13–17, 2014	553	± 4.2%	50%	21%	—	3%	26%
Rasmussen Reports	January 20–21, 2014	1,000	± 3%	51%	37%	—	2%	9%
Christopher Newport University	January 15–22, 2014	1,023	± 3.1%	50%	30%	—	2%	18%
Harper Polling	February 4–5, 2014	936	± 3.2%	44%	38%	—	—	18%
Roanoke College	February 22–28, 2014	707	± 3.9%	56%	29%	—	1%	13%
Quinnipiac University	March 19–24, 2014	1,288	± 2.7%	46%	31%	6%	—	17%
Public Policy Polling	April 1–2, 2014	689	± ?	49%	35%	—	—	16%
Rasmussen Reports	June 11–12, 2014	750	± 4%	53%	36%	—	3%	9%
Roanoke College	July 14–19, 2014	556	± 4.2%	47%	22%	5%	2%	25%
CBS News/New York Times	July 5–24, 2014	2,081	± 3.2%	53%	42%	—	2%	3%
Hampton University	July 27–30, 2014	804	± 2.9%	53%	28%	5%	—	14%
Hampton University	July 27–30, 2014	804	± 2.9%	55%	32%	—	—	13%
CBS News/New York Times	August 18 – September 2, 2014	1,635	± 3%	51%	39%	—	1%	9%
Christopher Newport University	September 2–7, 2014	713	± 3.7%	53%	31%	5%	—	11%
Roanoke College	September 13–19, 2014	630	± 3.9%	49%	29%	6%	—	16%
Quinnipiac University	September 17–22, 2014	1,010	± 3.1%	48%	39%	6%	—	7%
Quinnipiac University	September 17–22, 2014	1,010	± 3.1%	50%	41%	—	—	9%
Public Policy Polling	September 22–23, 2014	625	± 3.9%	48%	35%	4%	—	12%
Public Policy Polling	September 22–23, 2014	625	± 3.9%	49%	37%	—	—	14%
CBS News/New York Times	September 20 – October 1, 2014	1,656	± 3%	51%	39%	1%	0%	9%
Christopher Newport University	September 29 – October 5, 2014	690	± 3.7%	51%	39%	3%	—	7%
University of Mary Washington	October 1–6, 2014	444 LV	± 5.3%	47%	37%	6%	—	10%
University of Mary Washington	October 1–6, 2014	819 RV	± 3.9%	50%	30%	6%	—	14%
CBS News/NYT/YouGov	October 16–23, 2014	1,605	± 4%	49%	39%	1%	0%	11%
Roanoke College	October 20–25, 2014	738	± 3.6%	47%	35%	4%	—	15%
Vox Populi Polling	October 27–28, 2014	734	± 3.6%	44%	40%	5%	2%	9%
Christopher Newport University	October 23–29, 2014	815	± 3.4%	51%	44%	2%	—	3%
Public Policy Polling	October 29–30, 2014	937	± 3.2%	49%	40%	5%	—	6%

Hypothetical polling

With Bolling

Poll source	Date(s) administered	Sample size	Margin of error	Mark Warner (D)	Bill Bolling (R)	Undecided
Public Policy Polling	April 26–29, 2012	680	± 3.8%	51%	40%	9%
Public Policy Polling	January 4–6, 2013	602	± 4%	53%	35%	12%
Public Policy Polling	May 24–26, 2013	672	± 3.8%	54%	33%	13%
Public Policy Polling	July 11–14, 2013	601	± 4%	53%	35%	12%

With Cantor

Poll source	Date(s) administered	Sample size	Margin of error	Mark Warner (D)	Eric Cantor (R)	Undecided
Public Policy Polling	April 26–29, 2012	680	± 3.8%	51%	40%	9%
Public Policy Polling	January 4–6, 2013	602	± 4%	56%	37%	7%
Public Policy Polling	May 24–26, 2013	672	± 3.8%	53%	34%	13%
Public Policy Polling	July 11–14, 2013	601	± 4%	52%	36%	11%

With Cuccinelli

Poll source	Date(s) administered	Sample size	Margin of error	Mark Warner (D)	Ken Cuccinelli (R)	Undecided
Public Policy Polling	April 26–29, 2012	680	± 3.8%	51%	40%	9%
Public Policy Polling	January 4–6, 2013	602	± 4%	57%	36%	7%

With Kristol

Poll source	Date(s) administered	Sample size	Margin of error	Mark Warner (D)	Bill Kristol (R)	Undecided

With Marshall

Poll source	Date(s) administered	Sample size	Margin of error	Mark Warner (D)	Bob Marshall (R)	Undecided
Public Policy Polling	July 11–14, 2013	601	± 4%	50%	34%	16%

With McDonnell

Poll source	Date(s) administered	Sample size	Margin of error	Mark Warner (D)	Bob McDonnell (R)	Undecided
Public Policy Polling	April 26–29, 2012	680	± 3.8%	51%	40%	9%
Public Policy Polling	January 4–6, 2013	602	± 4%	52%	42%	7%
University of Mary Washington	March 20–24, 2013	1,004	± 3.5%	51%	35%	14%
Public Policy Polling	May 24–26, 2013	672	± 3.8%	50%	39%	11%
Public Policy Polling	July 11–14, 2013	601	± 4%	51%	36%	15%

With Obenshain

Poll source	Date(s) administered	Sample size	Margin of error	Mark Warner (D)	Mark Obenshain (R)	Undecided

=== Results ===
2014 United States Senate election in Virginia
Party	Candidate	Votes	%	±%
Democratic	Mark Warner (incumbent)	1,073,667	49.15%	−15.88%
Republican	Ed Gillespie	1,055,940	48.34%	+14.62%
Libertarian	Robert Sarvis	53,102	2.43%	+1.87%
Write-in		1,811	0.08%	–0.01%
Total votes		2,184,520	100.00%	N/A
Democratic hold				

==== By county and independent city ====
Locality	Mark Warner Democratic		Ed Gillespie Republican		Various candidates Other parties		Margin		Total
Locality	#	%	#	%	#	%	#	%	Total
Accomack	4,137	42.83%	5,259	54.45%	262	2.71%	-1,122	-11.62%	9,658
Albemarle	17,924	54.25%	13,930	42.16%	1,186	3.59%	3,994	12.09%	33,040
Alexandria	29,047	70.11%	11,480	27.71%	905	2.18%	17,567	42.40%	41,432
Alleghany	2,211	53.21%	1,835	44.16%	109	2.62%	376	9.05%	4,155
Amelia	1,377	33.85%	2,588	63.62%	103	2.53%	-1,211	-29.77%	4,068
Amherst	3,243	36.86%	5,370	61.04%	185	2.10%	-2,127	-24.18%	8,798
Appomattox	1,399	29.54%	3,234	68.29%	103	2.17%	-1,835	-38.75%	4,736
Arlington	47,709	70.49%	18,239	26.95%	1,735	2.56%	29,470	43.54%	67,683
Augusta	5,153	26.11%	14,011	71.00%	570	2.89%	-8,858	-44.89%	19,734
Bath	489	41.76%	638	54.48%	44	3.76%	-149	-12.72%	1,171
Bedford	6,855	27.74%	17,280	69.93%	576	2.33%	-10,425	-42.19%	24,711
Bland	514	28.24%	1,266	69.56%	40	2.20%	-752	-41.32%	1,820
Botetourt	3,488	31.49%	7,296	65.87%	293	2.65%	-3,808	-34.38%	11,077
Bristol	1,294	33.99%	2,445	64.22%	68	1.79%	-1,151	-30.23%	3,807
Brunswick	2,675	60.59%	1,692	38.32%	48	1.09%	983	22.27%	4,415
Buchanan	1,794	38.71%	2,794	60.28%	47	1.01%	-1,000	-21.57%	4,635
Buckingham	1,785	45.65%	2,015	51.53%	110	2.81%	-230	-5.88%	3,910
Buena Vista	475	39.39%	692	57.38%	39	3.23%	-217	-17.99%	1,206
Campbell	4,428	28.58%	10,761	69.45%	306	1.97%	-6,333	-40.87%	15,495
Caroline	3,879	51.20%	3,517	46.42%	180	2.38%	362	4.78%	7,576
Carroll	2,265	32.11%	4,587	65.03%	202	2.86%	-2,322	-32.92%	7,054
Charles City	1,593	64.29%	834	33.66%	51	2.06%	759	30.63%	2,478
Charlotte	1,462	40.91%	2,062	57.69%	50	1.40%	-600	-16.79%	3,574
Charlottesville	8,241	76.88%	2,054	19.16%	424	3.96%	6,187	57.72%	10,719
Chesapeake	29,602	48.71%	29,899	49.20%	1,266	2.08%	-297	-0.49%	60,767
Chesterfield	44,491	43.99%	53,306	52.70%	3,344	3.31%	-8,815	-8.72%	101,141
Clarke	1,954	39.13%	2,893	57.94%	146	2.92%	-939	-18.81%	4,993
Colonial Heights	1,187	25.37%	3,351	71.62%	141	3.01%	-2,164	-46.25%	4,679
Covington	731	60.26%	457	37.68%	25	2.06%	274	22.59%	1,213
Craig	559	34.48%	1,011	62.37%	51	3.15%	-452	-27.88%	1,621
Culpeper	3,823	32.90%	7,487	64.43%	311	2.68%	-3,664	-31.53%	11,621
Cumberland	1,228	44.24%	1,451	52.27%	97	3.49%	-223	-8.03%	2,776
Danville	6,259	57.89%	4,436	41.03%	117	1.08%	1,823	16.86%	10,812
Dickenson	1,416	41.94%	1,897	56.19%	63	1.87%	-481	-14.25%	3,376
Dinwiddie	3,467	47.34%	3,694	50.44%	162	2.21%	-227	-3.10%	7,323
Emporia	855	62.27%	501	36.49%	17	1.24%	354	25.78%	1,373
Essex	1,419	46.96%	1,545	51.13%	58	1.92%	-126	-4.17%	3,022
Fairfax City	3,812	54.51%	3,018	43.16%	163	2.33%	794	11.35%	6,993
Fairfax County	176,418	57.68%	122,857	40.17%	6,594	2.16%	53,561	17.51%	305,869
Falls Church	3,599	71.49%	1,309	26.00%	126	2.50%	2,290	45.49%	5,034
Fauquier	6,985	33.88%	13,219	64.12%	411	1.99%	-6,234	-30.24%	20,615
Floyd	1,889	40.88%	2,558	55.36%	174	3.77%	-669	-14.48%	4,621
Fluvanna	3,563	42.80%	4,480	53.81%	282	3.39%	-917	-11.02%	8,325
Franklin City	1,328	61.06%	818	37.61%	29	1.33%	510	23.45%	2,175
Franklin County	5,650	35.92%	9,664	61.44%	415	2.64%	-4,014	-25.52%	15,729
Frederick	6,659	30.33%	14,693	66.93%	601	2.74%	-8,034	-36.60%	21,953
Fredericksburg	3,341	58.34%	2,211	38.61%	175	3.06%	1,130	19.73%	5,727
Galax	564	42.09%	743	55.45%	33	2.46%	-179	-13.36%	1,340
Giles	1,760	36.97%	2,856	60.00%	144	3.03%	-1,096	-23.03%	4,760
Gloucester	3,729	33.91%	6,988	63.55%	279	2.54%	-3,259	-29.64%	10,996
Goochland	3,381	36.14%	5,735	61.30%	240	2.57%	-2,354	-25.16%	9,356
Grayson	1,441	34.76%	2,585	62.35%	120	2.89%	-1,144	-27.59%	4,146
Greene	1,655	32.63%	3,223	63.54%	194	3.82%	-1,568	-30.91%	5,072
Greensville	1,738	62.97%	984	35.65%	38	1.38%	754	27.32%	2,760
Halifax	4,435	46.20%	5,005	52.14%	159	1.66%	-570	-5.94%	9,599
Hampton	23,483	68.41%	10,149	29.56%	697	2.03%	13,334	38.84%	34,329
Hanover	12,437	32.13%	24,995	64.58%	1,274	3.29%	-12,558	-32.44%	38,706
Harrisonburg	3,865	51.27%	3,332	44.20%	342	4.54%	533	7.07%	7,539
Henrico	54,049	55.08%	41,171	41.95%	2,913	2.97%	12,878	13.12%	98,133
Henry	5,695	42.22%	7,549	55.97%	244	1.81%	-1,854	-13.75%	13,488
Highland	318	34.60%	564	61.37%	37	4.03%	-246	-26.77%	919
Hopewell	2,412	50.80%	2,197	46.27%	139	2.93%	215	4.53%	4,748
Isle of Wight	4,979	41.72%	6,714	56.25%	242	2.03%	-1,735	-14.54%	11,935
James City	11,577	43.72%	14,403	54.39%	502	1.90%	-2,826	-10.67%	26,482
King and Queen	1,012	47.33%	1,067	49.91%	59	2.76%	-55	-2.57%	2,138
King George	2,460	36.26%	4,148	61.13%	177	2.61%	-1,688	-24.88%	6,785
King William	1,797	34.89%	3,168	61.51%	185	3.59%	-1,371	-26.62%	5,150
Lancaster	1,924	41.89%	2,573	56.02%	96	2.09%	-649	-14.13%	4,593
Lee	2,030	34.93%	3,690	63.49%	92	1.58%	-1,660	-28.56%	5,812
Lexington	981	64.62%	501	33.00%	36	2.37%	480	31.62%	1,518
Loudoun	45,042	48.59%	45,500	49.08%	2,162	2.33%	-458	-0.49%	92,704
Louisa	3,936	39.07%	5,802	57.59%	337	3.34%	-1,866	-18.52%	10,075
Lunenburg	1,481	45.08%	1,736	52.85%	68	2.07%	-255	-7.76%	3,285
Lynchburg	8,284	42.71%	10,627	54.79%	484	2.50%	-2,343	-12.08%	19,395
Madison	1,418	34.73%	2,560	62.70%	105	2.57%	-1,142	-27.97%	4,083
Manassas	4,004	49.18%	3,891	47.80%	246	3.02%	113	1.39%	8,141
Manassas Park	1,107	52.79%	924	44.06%	66	3.15%	183	8.73%	2,097
Martinsville	2,146	60.55%	1,317	37.16%	81	2.29%	829	23.39%	3,544
Mathews	1,208	35.52%	2,141	62.95%	52	1.53%	-933	-27.43%	3,401
Mecklenburg	3,266	42.04%	4,375	56.31%	128	1.65%	-1,109	-14.27%	7,769
Middlesex	1,427	37.33%	2,304	60.27%	92	2.41%	-877	-22.94%	3,823
Montgomery	11,110	51.04%	9,776	44.91%	880	4.04%	1,334	6.13%	21,766
Nelson	2,496	49.17%	2,288	45.07%	292	5.75%	208	4.10%	5,076
New Kent	2,303	32.09%	4,668	65.05%	205	2.86%	-2,365	-32.96%	7,176
Newport News	23,405	60.37%	14,548	37.52%	817	2.11%	8,857	22.84%	38,770
Norfolk	29,210	68.66%	12,252	28.80%	1,081	2.54%	16,958	39.86%	42,543
Northampton	1,890	52.93%	1,553	43.49%	128	3.58%	337	9.44%	3,571
Northumberland	2,089	40.74%	2,939	57.31%	100	1.95%	-850	-16.58%	5,128
Norton	294	37.60%	462	59.08%	26	3.32%	-168	-21.48%	782
Nottoway	1,796	47.02%	1,942	50.84%	82	2.15%	-146	-3.82%	3,820
Orange	3,629	37.42%	5,814	59.94%	256	2.64%	-2,185	-22.53%	9,699
Page	1,654	29.33%	3,883	68.85%	103	1.83%	-2,229	-39.52%	5,640
Patrick	1,538	31.48%	3,228	66.08%	119	2.44%	-1,690	-34.60%	4,885
Petersburg	6,800	87.76%	843	10.88%	105	1.36%	5,957	76.88%	7,748
Pittsylvania	6,558	36.23%	11,278	62.30%	266	1.47%	-4,720	-26.07%	18,102
Poquoson	1,077	25.02%	3,128	72.66%	100	2.32%	-2,051	-47.64%	4,305
Portsmouth	17,101	69.94%	6,760	27.65%	591	2.42%	10,341	42.29%	24,452
Powhatan	2,525	26.07%	6,785	70.05%	376	3.88%	-4,260	-43.98%	9,686
Prince Edward	2,550	52.39%	2,194	45.08%	123	2.53%	356	7.31%	4,867
Prince George	3,700	40.74%	5,132	56.51%	249	2.74%	-1,432	-15.77%	9,081
Prince William	48,140	50.39%	45,366	47.49%	2,022	2.12%	2,774	2.90%	95,528
Pulaski	3,301	39.76%	4,796	57.76%	206	2.48%	-1,495	-18.01%	8,303
Radford	1,446	51.81%	1,256	45.00%	89	3.19%	190	6.81%	2,791
Rappahannock	1,213	43.31%	1,531	54.66%	57	2.03%	-318	-11.35%	2,801
Richmond City	38,963	75.75%	10,750	20.90%	1,726	3.36%	28,213	54.85%	51,439
Richmond County	844	40.66%	1,194	57.51%	38	1.83%	-350	-16.86%	2,076
Roanoke City	12,311	59.29%	7,714	37.15%	739	3.56%	4,597	22.14%	20,764
Roanoke County	11,605	37.91%	18,166	59.34%	843	2.75%	-6,561	-21.43%	30,614
Rockbridge	2,713	41.34%	3,696	56.32%	154	2.35%	-983	-14.98%	6,563
Rockingham	5,323	25.81%	14,744	71.48%	559	2.71%	-9,421	-45.68%	20,626
Russell	2,442	37.56%	3,947	60.71%	112	1.72%	-1,505	-23.15%	6,501
Salem	2,750	39.99%	3,914	56.92%	212	3.08%	-1,164	-16.93%	6,876
Scott	1,406	27.15%	3,699	71.42%	74	1.43%	-2,293	-44.27%	5,179
Shenandoah	3,219	29.02%	7,624	68.73%	249	2.24%	-4,405	-39.71%	11,092
Smyth	2,405	35.08%	4,296	62.67%	154	2.25%	-1,891	-27.59%	6,855
Southampton	2,377	46.96%	2,594	51.24%	91	1.80%	-217	-4.29%	5,062
Spotsylvania	12,381	38.00%	19,445	59.68%	758	2.33%	-7,064	-21.68%	32,584
Stafford	13,436	39.53%	19,790	58.22%	763	2.24%	-6,354	-18.69%	33,989
Staunton	3,010	48.26%	3,045	48.82%	182	2.92%	-35	-0.56%	6,237
Suffolk	13,533	55.95%	10,202	42.18%	452	1.87%	3,331	13.77%	24,187
Surry	1,545	60.14%	963	37.49%	61	2.37%	582	22.65%	2,569
Sussex	1,710	57.25%	1,241	41.55%	36	1.21%	469	15.70%	2,987
Tazewell	2,574	26.60%	6,972	72.05%	130	1.34%	-4,398	-45.45%	9,676
Virginia Beach	49,218	46.11%	54,602	51.15%	2,927	2.74%	-5,384	-5.04%	106,747
Warren	3,048	33.00%	5,933	64.23%	256	2.77%	-2,885	-31.23%	9,237
Washington	4,402	31.41%	9,361	66.79%	252	1.80%	-4,959	-35.38%	14,015
Waynesboro	1,951	40.54%	2,675	55.59%	186	3.87%	-724	-15.05%	4,812
Westmoreland	2,217	47.64%	2,338	50.24%	99	2.13%	-121	-2.60%	4,654
Williamsburg	2,466	62.96%	1,360	34.72%	91	2.32%	1,106	28.24%	3,917
Winchester	2,732	46.14%	2,985	50.41%	204	3.45%	-253	-4.27%	5,921
Wise	2,181	28.24%	5,414	70.10%	128	1.66%	-3,233	-41.86%	7,723
Wythe	2,393	33.51%	4,562	63.88%	187	2.62%	-2,169	-30.37%	7,142
York	7,974	38.66%	12,141	58.87%	510	2.47%	-4,167	-20.20%	20,625
Totals	1,073,667	49.15%	1,055,940	48.34%	54,913	2.51%	17,727	0.81%	2,184,520

==== Counties and independent cities that flipped from Democratic to Republican ====
- Accomack (largest city: Chincoteague)
- Amelia (no municipalities)
- Amherst (largest city: Amherst)
- Appomattox (largest city: Appomattox)
- Bath (largest city: Hot Springs)
- Bedford (largest city: Bedford)
- Bland (largest city: Bland)
- Botetourt (largest city: Cloverdale)
- Buckingham (largest city: Dillwyn)
- Buchanan (largest city: Grundy)
- Buena Vista (independent city)
- Bristol (independent city)
- Campbell (largest city: Altavista)
- Carroll (largest city: Hillsville)
- Charlotte (largest city: Keysville)
- Chesapeake (independent city)
- Chesterfield (no municipalities)
- Clarke (largest city: Berryville)
- Craig (largest city: New Castle)
- Cumberland (largest city: Farmville)
- Culpeper (largest borough: Culpeper)
- Dickenson (largest borough: Clintwood)
- Dinwiddie (largest town: McKenney)
- Essex (largest city: Tappahannock)
- Emporia (independent city)
- Fauquier (largest city: Warrenton)
- Floyd (largest city: Floyd)
- Franklin (largest city: Rocky Mount)
- Fluvanna (largest city: Monticello)
- Galax (independent city)
- Giles (largest city: Pearisburg)
- Frederick (largest city: Winchester)
- Gloucester (largest city: Gloucester Point)
- Goochland (no municipalities)
- Grayson (largest city: Independence)
- Greene (largest city: Twin Lakes)
- Halifax (largest city: South Boston)
- Henry (largest city: Martinsville)
- Highland (largest city: Monterey)
- Isle of Wight (largest city: Smithfield)
- James City (no municipalities)
- King and Queen (largest city: King and Queen Courthouse)
- King George (largest city: King George)
- King William (largest city: West Point)
- Lancaster (largest city: Kilmarnock)
- Lee (largest city: Pennington Gap)
- Loudoun (largest city: Leesburg)
- Louisa (largest city: Louisa)
- Lunenburg (largest city: Victoria)
- Lexington (independent city)
- Lynchburg (independent city)
- Madison (largest city: Madison)
- Matthews (no municipalities)
- Mecklenburg (largest city: South Hill)
- Middlesex (largest city: Urbanna)
- Northumberland (largest city: Heathsville)
- New Kent (no municipalities)
- Norton (independent city)
- Radford (independent city)
- Nottoway (largest city: Blackstone)
- Orange (largest city: Orange)
- Page (largest city: Luray)
- Patrick (largest city: Stuart)
- Pittsylvania (largest city: Chatham)
- Prince George (largest city: Fort Gregg-Adams)
- Pulaski (largest city: Pulaski)
- Salem (independent city)
- Staunton (independent city)
- Rappahannock (largest city: Washington)
- Richmond (largest city: Warsaw)
- Roanoke (largest city: Vinton)
- Rockbridge (largest city: Lexington)
- Russell (largest city: Lebanon)
- Scott (largest city: Gate City)
- Shenandoah (largest city: Strasburg)
- Smyth (largest city: Marion)
- Southampton (largest municipality: Courtland)
- Spotsylvania (largest municipality: Spotsylvania Courthoouse)
- Stafford (no municipalities)
- Tazewell (largest city: Richlands)
- Warren (largest city: Front Royal)
- Washington (largest city: Abingdon)
- Wise (largest city: Big Stone Gap)
- Westmoreland (largest city: Colonial Beach)
- Winchester (independent city)
- Virginia Beach (independent city)
- Waynesboro (independent city)
- Wythe (largest city: Wytheville)
- York (largest city: Grafton)

==== By congressional district ====
Despite losing the state, Gillespie won eight of 11 congressional districts.

District	Gillespie	Warner	Representative
1st	56%	42%	Rob Wittman
2nd	49%	48%	Scott Rigell
3rd	21%	77%	Bobby Scott
4th	51%	47%	Randy Forbes
5th	54%	44%	Robert Hurt
6th	60%	37%	Bob Goodlatte
7th	56%	41%	Eric Cantor
7th	56%	41%	Dave Brat
8th	31%	67%	Jim Moran
8th	31%	67%	Don Beyer
9th	59%	38%	Morgan Griffith
10th	52%	46%	Frank Wolf
10th	52%	46%	Barbara Comstock
11th	39%	59%	Gerry Connolly

== See also ==
- 2014 United States Senate elections
- 2014 United States elections
- 2014 United States House of Representatives elections in Virginia
