= 1996 United States Senate election in Virginia =

- November 5, 1996
- Turnout: 50.2% (voting eligible)
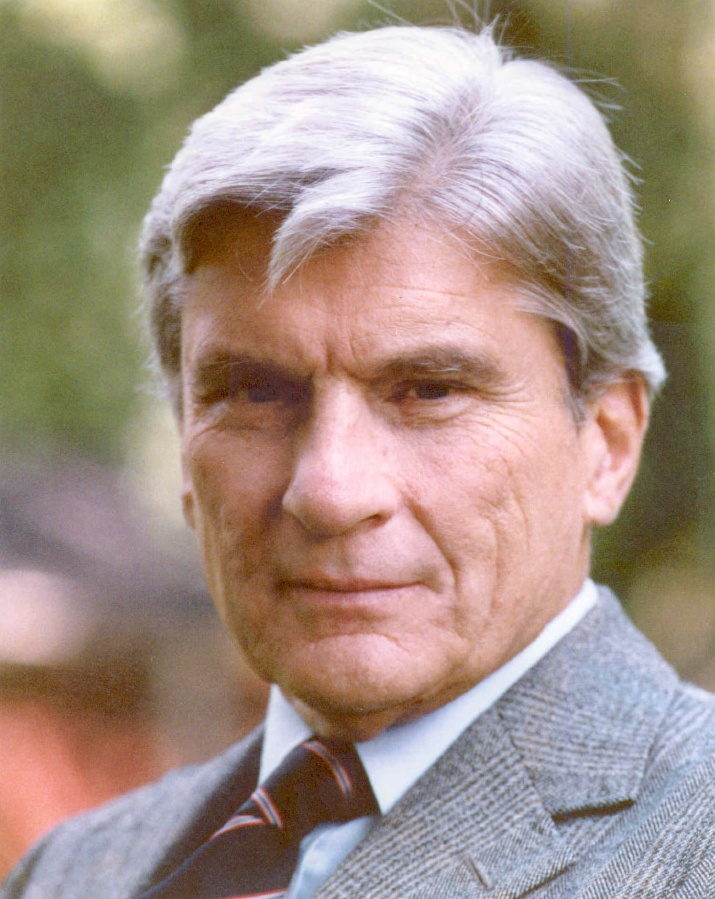

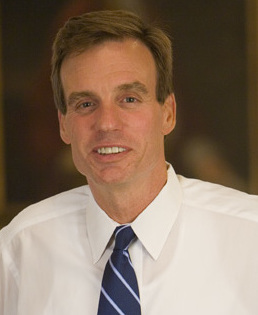
Nominee	John Warner	Mark Warner
Party	Republican	Democratic
Popular vote	1,235,743	1,115,981
Percentage	52.48%	47.39%
- J. Warner: 40–50% 50–60% 60–70% 70–80% 80–90% >90% M. Warner: 50–60% 60–70% 70–80% 80–90% >90% Tie: 40–50% 50% No votes
U.S. senator before election
John Warner
Republican
Elected U.S. Senator
John Warner
Republican

The 1996 United States Senate election in Virginia was held on November 5, 1996. Incumbent Republican U.S. Senator John Warner won re-election to a fourth term over Democratic challenger Mark Warner (unrelated), who later served as Governor of Virginia from 2002 to 2006 and won this Senate seat in 2008 after John Warner declined to run for re-election that year.

== Democratic primary ==
=== Candidates ===
- Leslie Byrne, former U.S. Representative from Falls Church
- Mark Warner, former Chair of the Democratic Party of Virginia
- Nancy Spannaus, independent candidate for the U.S. Senate in 1990

=== Results ===
Democratic convention vote
Party	Candidate	Votes	%
Democratic	Mark Warner	626	66.53%
Democratic	Leslie Byrne	301	31.99%
Democratic	Nancy B. Spannaus	14	1.49%
Total votes		941	100.00%

== Republican primary ==
=== Candidates ===
- John Warner, incumbent U.S. Senator
- James C. Miller III, former Director of the Office of Management and Budget and candidate for Senate in 1994

=== Campaign ===
John Warner, a moderate Republican who held this Senate seat from 1979, remained a popular and powerful political figure. A former United States Secretary of the Navy, he was at this time Chairman of the Senate Rules Committee.

He easily won renomination, despite opposition by a number of conservative Republicans, who distrusted him because of his moderate positions (Warner was pro-choice, pro-gun control and refused to support 1994 Senate nominee Oliver North due to his role in the Iran-Contra Affair).

Warner was endorsed by such notable figures as Bob Dole, George H. W. Bush, and Colin Powell, while Miller was endorsed by the NRA.

=== Results ===
Republican primary results
Party	Candidate	Votes	%
Republican	John Warner (incumbent)	323,520	65.55%
Republican	James C. Miller III	170,015	34.45%
Total votes		493,535	100.00%

== General election ==
=== Candidates ===
- Mark Warner (D), businessman
- John Warner (R), incumbent U.S. Senator

=== Campaign ===
The two Warners (no relation) competed in a hotly-contested Senate election. The incumbent, who was a moderate Republican, was very popular and did not even face a major opponent in 1990. Although Mark Warner was relatively unknown, he became one of John Warner's strongest challengers. The Democrat self-financed his campaign and ended up outspending the Republican. In October, the Democrat outspent the incumbent 5–1.

The incumbent had to compete in a primary against a more conservative candidate because he had endorsed an independent in the 1994 U.S. Senate election, instead of controversial Republican nominee Oliver North. Despite this, North did endorse John Warner in the 1996 election. In the general election, the incumbent called the Democrat a "robber baron," "Carpetbagger," and a "Connecticut Yankee" who raised money from outside the state. Mark Warner tried to compete in the Southern part of the state, which is traditionally Republican territory. He earned the endorsement from the Reform Party of Virginia.

=== Polling ===
In June, the incumbent was leading 58%-24%. On September 19, the incumbent led 54%-34%.

=== Results ===
County Flips: Democratic Flip / Republican Hold

United States Senate election in Virginia, 1996
Party	Candidate	Votes	%	±%
Republican	John Warner (incumbent)	1,235,744	52.48%	−28.43%
Democratic	Mark Warner	1,115,982	47.39%	+47.39%
Write-in		2,989	0.13%	-0.81%
Majority		119,762	5.09%	−57.67%
Turnout		2,354,715		
Republican hold		Swing		

== Analysis ==
Mark Warner lost the parts of the state that are outside the three largest metropolitan areas, 51%-49%, a very impressive result for a Democrat in this heavily Republican territory. However, John Warner's strength among moderates enabled him to carry Northern Virginia 55%-45%, which led to him winning the general election 52%-47%. This was the closest reelection margin of John Warner's career.

In 2002, John Warner was reelected with no Democratic challenger, defeating independent candidate Spannaus by a wide margin. He declined to run for re-election in 2008.

In 2001, Mark Warner was elected Governor, serving from 2002 to 2006. He left office with a high approval rating and many believed he was a potential candidate for the 2008 presidential election. After declining to run, he was mentioned as a potential vice presidential nominee. However, John Warner retired in 2008, and Mark Warner ran for and won the open Senate seat. John Warner would later endorse Mark Warner in his successful reelection campaigns in 2014 and 2020. This is the only time that Mark Warner lost an election in Virginia.

== See also ==
- 1996 United States Senate elections
