= 1990 Virginia ballot measures =

The 1990 Virginia State Elections took place on Election Day, November 5, 1990, the same day as the U.S. Senate and U.S. House elections in the state. The only statewide elections on the ballot were four constitutional referendums to amend the Virginia State Constitution. Because Virginia state elections are held on off-years, no statewide officers or state legislative elections were held. All referendums were referred to the voters by the Virginia General Assembly.

== Question 1 ==
This amendment asked voters to lower the personal property tax rates for residents who are at least 65 years old and for residents who are permanently and totally disabled.

Question 1
Choice	Votes	%
For	942,840	81.61
Against	212,486	18.39
Total	1,155,326	100.00
Source: - Official Results

== Question 2 ==
This amendment asked voters to allocate the proceeds from private property seized and forfeited to the Commonwealth for drug law violations for funding law enforcement instead of being allocated to the Virginia Literacy Fund, which supports public education in the state.

Question 2
Choice	Votes	%
For	896,275	79.12
Against	236,581	20.88
Total	1,132,856	100.00
Source: - Official Results

== Question 3 ==
This amendment asked voters to establish a county/local-level tax for the purpose of funding local transportation projects and would have authorized counties to establish a new category of local debt for the purposes of funding local transportation. Most counties in Virginia do not have any local taxes and voters rejected the amendment by a wide margin.

Question 3
Choice	Votes	%
For	262,698	23.87
Against	837,885	76.13
Total	1,100,583	100.00
Source: - Official Results

== Question 4 ==
This amendment asked voters to increase state taxes for the purpose of funding state transportation projects and would have authorized the Virginia General Assembly to establish a new category of state debt for the purposes of funding transportation throughout Virginia. Like the previous question, this amendment was very unpopular and was also rejected by voters.

Question 4
Choice	Votes	%
For	234,070	21.34
Against	862,730	78.66
Total	1,096,800	100.00
Source: - Official Results
