= Our America Initiative =

Libertarian political organization

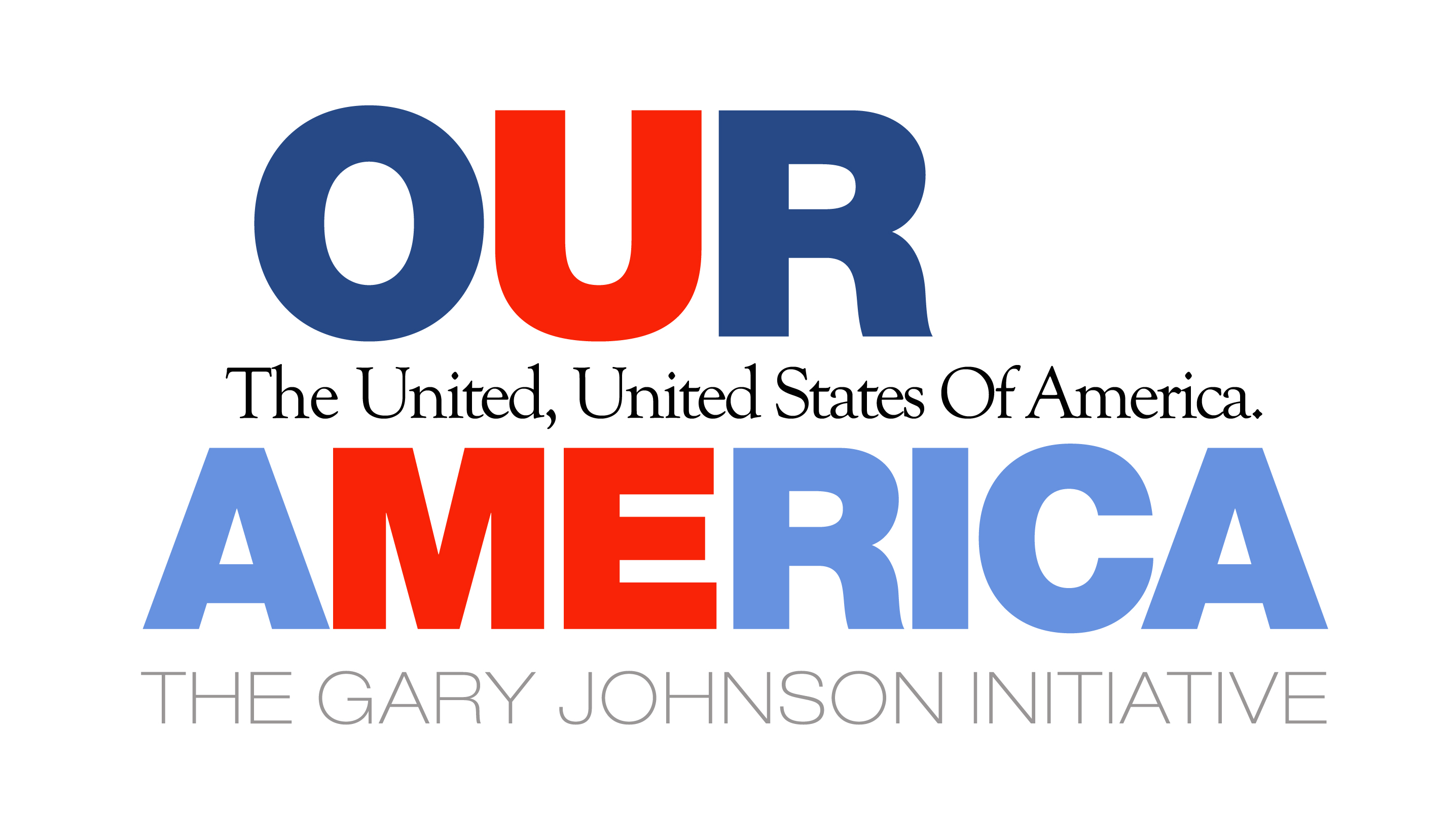
- Formation: December 2009
- Type: 501(c)(4)
- Purpose: OUR America Initiative seeks to broaden the parameters of the public policy debate of current topics in the national arena. We look to enlighten the population about civil liberties, free enterprise, limited government, and traditional American values. It is our aim to increase the amount of discussion and involvement regarding all-important issues.
- Headquarters: Salt Lake City, Utah
- Location: United States
- Website: ouramericainitiative.com

The Our America Initiative was a 501(c)(4) political advocacy committee formed by Gary Johnson, the former Republican politician who served as the 29th governor of New Mexico from 1995 to 2003. The 501(c)(4) committee was created in December 2009, when Johnson hired strategist Ron Nielson of NSON Opinion Strategy to help organize a 501(c)(4) committee. The two have worked together since 1993, when Nielson ran Johnson's successful gubernatorial campaign.

Johnson served as the Honorary Chairman for the Our America Initiative. The focus of the organization is to speak out on issues regarding topics such as government efficiency, lowering taxes, winning the war on drug abuse, protecting civil liberties, revitalizing the economy and promoting entrepreneurship and privatization.

The mission statement of the Our America Initiative: "OUR America Initiative seeks to broaden the parameters of the public policy debate of current topics in the national arena. We look to enlighten the population about civil liberties, free enterprise, limited government, and traditional American values. It is our aim to increase the amount of discussion and involvement regarding all-important issues."

== Lawsuit against the Commission on Presidential Debates ==
In 2016, Our America Initiative funded a lawsuit filed by the Libertarian Party and the Green Party (as well as Gary Johnson and Jill Stein, the eventual presidential nominees for the respective parties) against the Commission on Presidential Debates; the lawsuit advanced the position that "the exclusion of qualified candidates from the general election presidential debates by the commission violates federal antitrust laws."

Judge Rosemary M. Collyer of the U.S. District Court for Washington, D.C. rejected the legal challenge, ruling that "Johnson and Stein have no standing to make antitrust and First Amendment challenges to the CPD’s rules (which require a third-party candidate to average 15 percent support in five national polls in the run-up to debates), because the 'Defendants here are private parties.'"

== Liberty Tour 2016 ==
During the 2016 election, Our America Initiative sponsored a national tour, "visiting college campuses and other venues across America to raise awareness about third party inclusion in national presidential debates."

The tour made stops in 40 states; speakers included Governors Gary Johnson and Bill Weld, Unleash Your Inner Company author John Chisholm, Law Enforcement Against Prohibition executive director and former Baltimore Police Chief Neill Franklin, Free the People's Matt Kibbe, Republicans Ed Lopez and Liz Mair, Conscious Capitalism's Alex McCobin, Reason Foundation’s David Nott, Foundation for Economic Education's Jeffrey Tucker, the Libertarian Party's Carla Howell, former Delaware attorney general and over-criminalization activist Ken Abraham, and author and journalist Naomi Wolf as well as comedians Jeremy McClellan, Viceland’s Travis Irvine, and We the Internet's Lou Perez.
