= 2002 United States Senate election in Virginia =

- November 5, 2002
- Turnout: 29.0% (voting eligible)
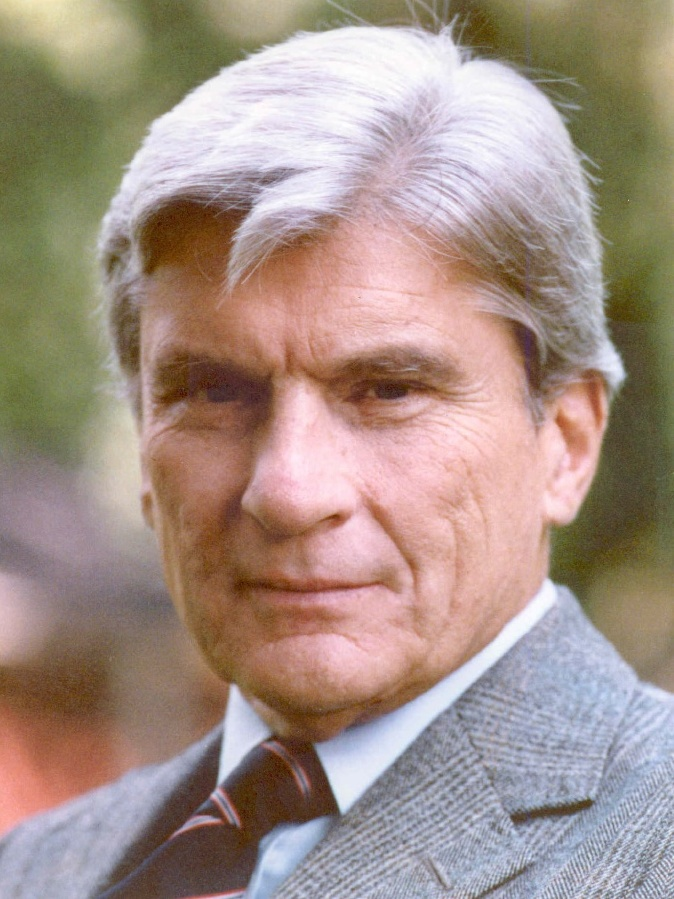

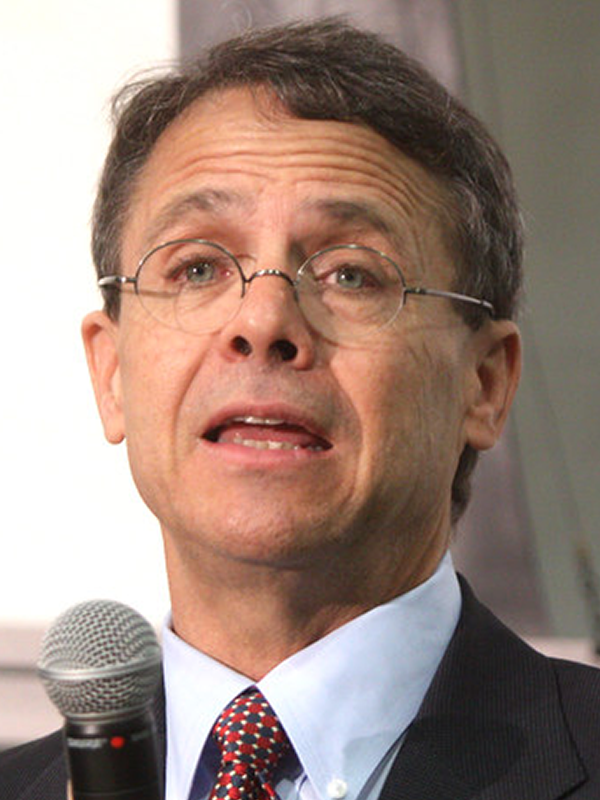
Nominee	John Warner	Nancy Spannaus	Jacob Hornberger
Party	Republican	Independent	Independent
Popular vote	1,229,894	145,102	106,055
Percentage	82.58%	9.74%	7.12%
- Warner: 60–70% 70–80% 80–90% >90%
U.S. senator before election
John Warner
Republican
Elected U.S. Senator
John Warner
Republican

The 2002 United States Senate election in Virginia was held on November 5, 2002. Incumbent Senator John Warner won re-election to a fifth term, making him one of only three Virginia U.S. senators to serve five or more terms. Democrats did not field a candidate against Warner, and he won every single county and city in the state with at least 60% of the vote. As of 2026, this was the last time Republicans won a U.S. Senate election in Virginia.

== Major candidates ==
=== Independents ===
- Jacob Hornberger, libertarian political activist
- Nancy Spannaus, LaRouche Movement activist

=== Republican ===
- John Warner, incumbent U.S. senator

== General election ==
=== Predictions ===
Source	Ranking	As of
Sabato's Crystal Ball	Safe R	November 4, 2002

=== Results ===
County Flips: Republican Hold Flip

United States Senate election in Virginia, 2002
Party	Candidate	Votes	%	±%
Republican	John Warner (incumbent)	1,229,894	82.58%	+30.10%
Independent	Nancy B. Spannaus	145,102	9.74%	
Independent	Jacob Hornberger	106,055	7.12%	
Write-ins		8,371	0.56%	+0.43%
Majority		1,084,792	72.83%	+67.75%
Turnout		1,489,422		
Republican hold		Swing		

==== Counties and independent cities that flipped from Democratic to Republican ====
- Appomattox (largest city: Appomattox)
- Bath (largest city: Hot Springs)
- Bland (largest city: Bland)
- Buckingham (largest city: Dillwyn)
- Buchanan (largest city: Grundy)
- Buena Vista (independent city)
- Bristol (independent city)
- Charlotte (largest city: Keysville)
- Chesapeake (independent city)
- Chesapeake (independent city)
- Craig (largest city: New Castle)
- Cumberland (largest city: Farmville)
- Dickenson (largest borough: Clintwood)
- Dinwiddie (largest town: McKenney)
- Emporia (independent city)
- Franklin (largest city: Rocky Mount)
- Galax (independent city)
- Giles (largest city: Pearisburg)
- Grayson (largest city: Independence)
- Henry (largest city: Martinsville)
- King and Queen (largest city: King and Queen Courthouse)
- King William (largest city: West Point)
- Lee (largest city: Pennington Gap)
- Louisa (largest city: Louisa)
- Lunenburg (largest city: Victoria)
- Norton (independent city)
- Radford (independent city)
- Pulaski (largest city: Pulaski)
- Russell (largest city: Lebanon)
- Scott (largest city: Gate City)
- Smyth (largest city: Marion)
- Southampton (largest municipality: Courtland)
- Tazewell (largest city: Richlands)
- Wise (largest city: Big Stone Gap)
- Westmoreland (largest city: Colonial Beach)
- Wythe (largest city: Wytheville)
- Nelson (largest municipality: Nellysford)
- Prince Edward (largest municipality: Farmville)
- Williamsburg (independent city)
- Caroline (largest borough: Bowling Green)
- Hopewell (independent city)
- Montgomery (largest borough: Blacksburg)
- Covington (independent city)
- Martinsville (independent city)
- Brunswick (largest borough: Lawrenceville)
- Charlottesville (independent city)
- Northampton (largest borough: Exmore)
- Surry (no municipalities)
- Emporia (independent city)
- Roanoke (independent city)
- Richmond (independent city)
- Falls Church (independent city)
- Norfolk (independent city)
- Portsmouth (independent city)
- Alexandria (independent city)
- Buena Vista (independent city)
- Alleghany (largest borough: Clinfton Forge)
- Arlington (no municipalities)
- Greensville (largest city: Jarratt)
- Sussex (largest city: Waverly)
- Petersburg (independent city)
- Charles City (no municipalities)
- Franklin (largest city: Rocky Mount)

== See also ==
- 2002 United States Senate elections
