= 2008 United States Senate election in Virginia =

- November 4, 2008
- Turnout: 67.0% (voting eligible)
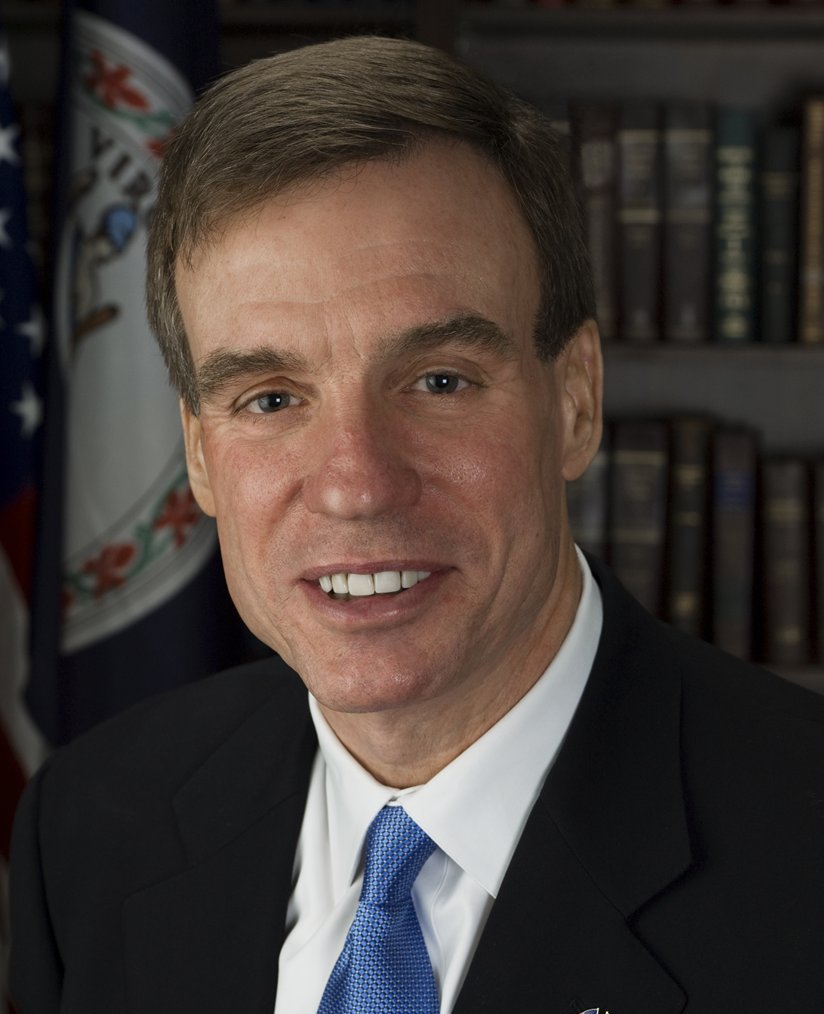

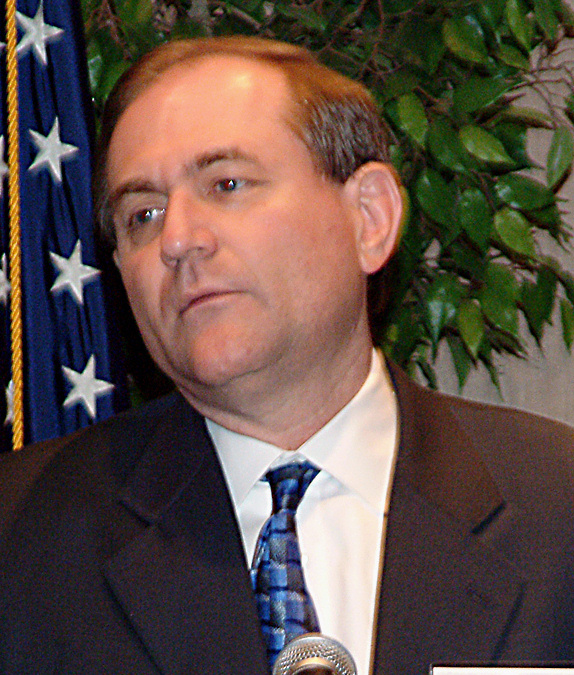
Nominee	Mark Warner	Jim Gilmore
Party	Democratic	Republican
Popular vote	2,369,317	1,228,830
Percentage	65.03%	33.73%
- Warner: 40–50% 50–60% 60–70% 70–80% 80–90% >90% Gilmore: 40–50% 50–60%
U.S. senator before election
John Warner
Republican
Elected U.S. Senator
Mark Warner
Democratic

The 2008 United States Senate election in Virginia was held on November 4, 2008, to elect a member of the United States Senate to represent the Commonwealth of Virginia. Incumbent Republican U.S. senator John Warner declined to seek re-election to a sixth term. Democratic former governor Mark Warner (no relation) defeated Republican former governor Jim Gilmore by a 31-point margin. Warner was the first Democrat to win this seat since 1966. This was also the first time since 1964 that the state voted simultaneously for a Democratic presidential candidate and a Democratic Senate candidate, having voted for Barack Obama in the concurrent presidential election, albeit by a far lesser margin. This was Virginia's first open-seat election since 1988. Since Warner took office in 2009, Democrats have held both of Virginia's Senate seats, which they had last done in 1970, when Harry F. Byrd Jr. left the Democratic Party to become an independent.

Warner's large margin of victory was reflected throughout the state — Gilmore won only six counties and independent cities (Augusta, Colonial Heights, Hanover, Poquoson, Powhatan, and Rockingham), and his margin did not exceed more than 2,000 votes in any of them. Analysts attributed Warner's large margin of victory to various factors, such as Warner outraising Gilmore more than 9-to-1, and Warner's high approval rating as governor. According to VCU's Commonwealth poll, only 23 percent of Virginian adults had a favorable view of Gilmore; 47 percent had a favorable view of Warner.

To date, this is the last time Amelia County and Bland County voted Democratic. This is the last time that a Democratic candidate won a majority of Virginia's counties and independent cities.

== Background ==
John Warner, a former United States Under Secretary of the Navy, had served Virginia in the Senate since 1979, and had been cagey about whether he would be running for re-election. He would have been favored for a sixth term had he decided to run again, even with recent Democratic gains in the state. In early 2007, it was speculated that Warner, who had turned 80 in February of that year, would retire. When Warner reported on April 12, 2007, that he had raised only $500 in campaign contributions during the first quarter, speculation increased that he might not seek a sixth term.

On August 31, 2007, Warner formally announced that he would not be seeking re-election. The race was expected to be competitive for Democrats, given the Democrats' two successive gubernatorial victories (2001, 2005) and the unseating of Republican senator George Allen by Jim Webb in 2006.

The Wall Street Journal reported a story of National Republican Senatorial Committee chairman Senator John Ensign outlining the 10 most competitive seats of the 2008 Senate election. When asked about the two GOP seats likely to switch parties, Virginia and New Mexico, on whether the NRSC was mulling walking away to work on other seats that could be won, Ensign said, "You don't waste money on races that don't need it or you can't win." This suggested that the NRSC might have started cutting money off.

== Republican nomination ==
=== Candidates ===
- Jim Gilmore, former governor of Virginia
- Bob Marshall, state delegate from Manassas

==== Withdrew ====
- Tom Davis, U.S. representative from Vienna

==== Declined ====
- John Warner, incumbent U.S. senator since 1979

Republican convention results by congressional district Gilmore: 50–60%; 60–70%; Marshall: 50–60%; 60–70%; 70–80%

On September 16, 2007, Republican Rep. Tom Davis of the 11th District unofficially announced that he would seek election to the seat. The Washington Times reported that John Warner delayed his retirement announcement specifically to help Davis.

On October 1, 2007, the editors of the National Review encouraged Virginia voters to draft General Peter Pace, the retiring Chairman of the Joint Chiefs of Staff, to run in 2008 for the Senate seat to be vacated by retiring Senator John Warner. The magazine cited Pace's conservative Catholic beliefs in making its suggestion.

On October 13, the Republican Party of Virginia's State Central Committee voted 47–37 to hold a statewide convention rather than a primary. Former Virginia governor Jim Gilmore argued strongly for a convention, claiming it would save the candidates money. It reportedly costs $4 million to compete in a primary, while it costs only $1 million for a convention. Davis argued that a primary would expose the candidates to the kind of environment they would face in November. A primary was thought to favor Davis due to his popularity in voter-rich Northern Virginia. In contrast, a convention was thought to favor Gilmore because most of the delegates would come from the party's activist base, which is tilted heavily to the right. With the decision, Gilmore said he was seriously considering entering the race.

Davis dropped out of the race on October 25, 2007, citing the potential difficulties of defeating Gilmore in the conservative-dominated GOP convention and in taking on Warner, who is very popular in Davis' own Northern Virginia base. Gilmore confirmed his candidacy on November 19, 2007.

On January 7, 2008, Delegate Bob Marshall (R-Prince William County), a sixteen-year state legislator from Northern Virginia known for his social conservative values, announced he would challenge Gilmore for the Republican nomination May 31, 2008. The convention was held on May 31, 2008, where Gilmore won the nomination with 50.3% of the vote, just 66 votes more than Marshall.

Republican Convention Vote

Candidate	1st District	2nd District	3rd District	4th District	5th District	6th District	7th District	8th District	9th District	10th District	11th District	Total
Jim Gilmore	491	613	121	319	667	531	1036	156	552	160	557	5223
Bob Marshall	643	345	75	383	420	507	582	145	335	585	1137	5157
Total	1134	958	196	702	1087	938	1618	301	887	745	1714	10380

== Democratic nomination ==
On September 12, 2007, former Governor Mark Warner (no relation to John Warner) announced his candidacy. Mark Warner had challenged John Warner for his Senate seat in 1996, but was narrowly defeated. Mark Warner later won election in 2001 as Governor of Virginia, and left office with a high level of popularity in 2006. He was confirmed as the party nominee at the state convention on June 10, 2008, as he went unopposed.

== General election ==
=== Candidates ===
- Jim Gilmore, former governor of Virginia (Republican)
- Glenda Parker, retired United States Air Force officer and candidate for U.S. Senate in 2006 (Independent Greens)
- Bill Redpath, national chair of the Libertarian Party (Libertarian)
- Mark Warner, former governor of Virginia (Democratic)

On March 29, 2008, the Libertarian Party of Virginia state convention nominated Bill Redpath as its Senate candidate. Redpath, who was serving as national party chair at the time, cited the importance of running a Libertarian candidate for federal office this election year, considering the fact that the Independent Greens had been fielding candidates so actively in recent years. Glenda Gail Parker from Alexandria, a retired U.S. Air Force officer, ran again for the Independent Greens as she did in the 2006 Senate election.

=== Campaign ===
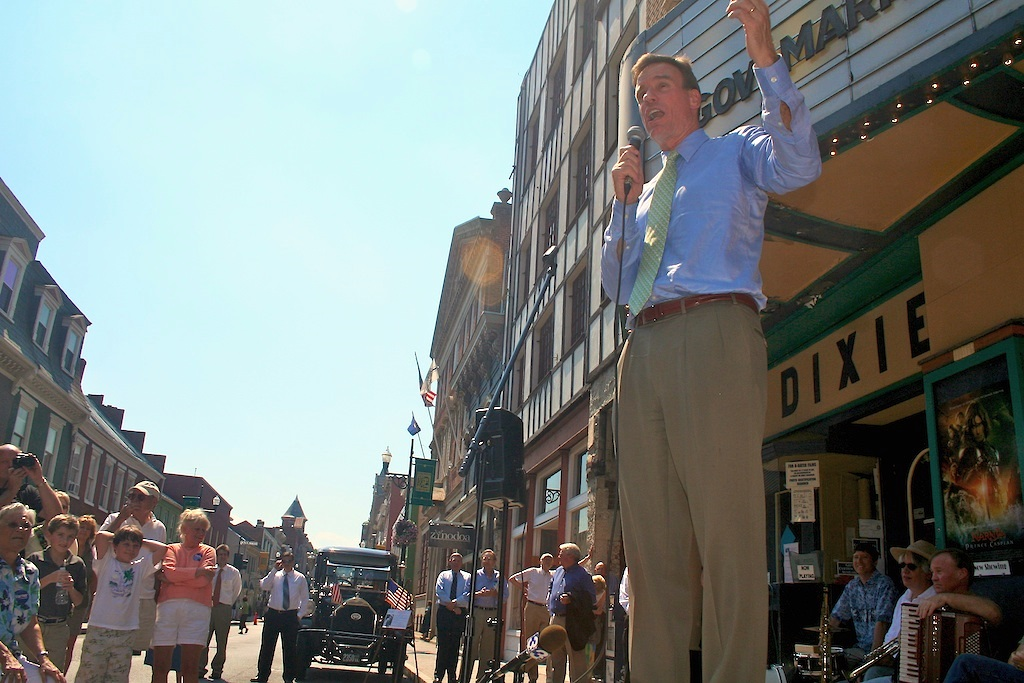
Former Gov. Mark Warner (D) campaigns at the Dixie Theatre in Staunton, Virginia.

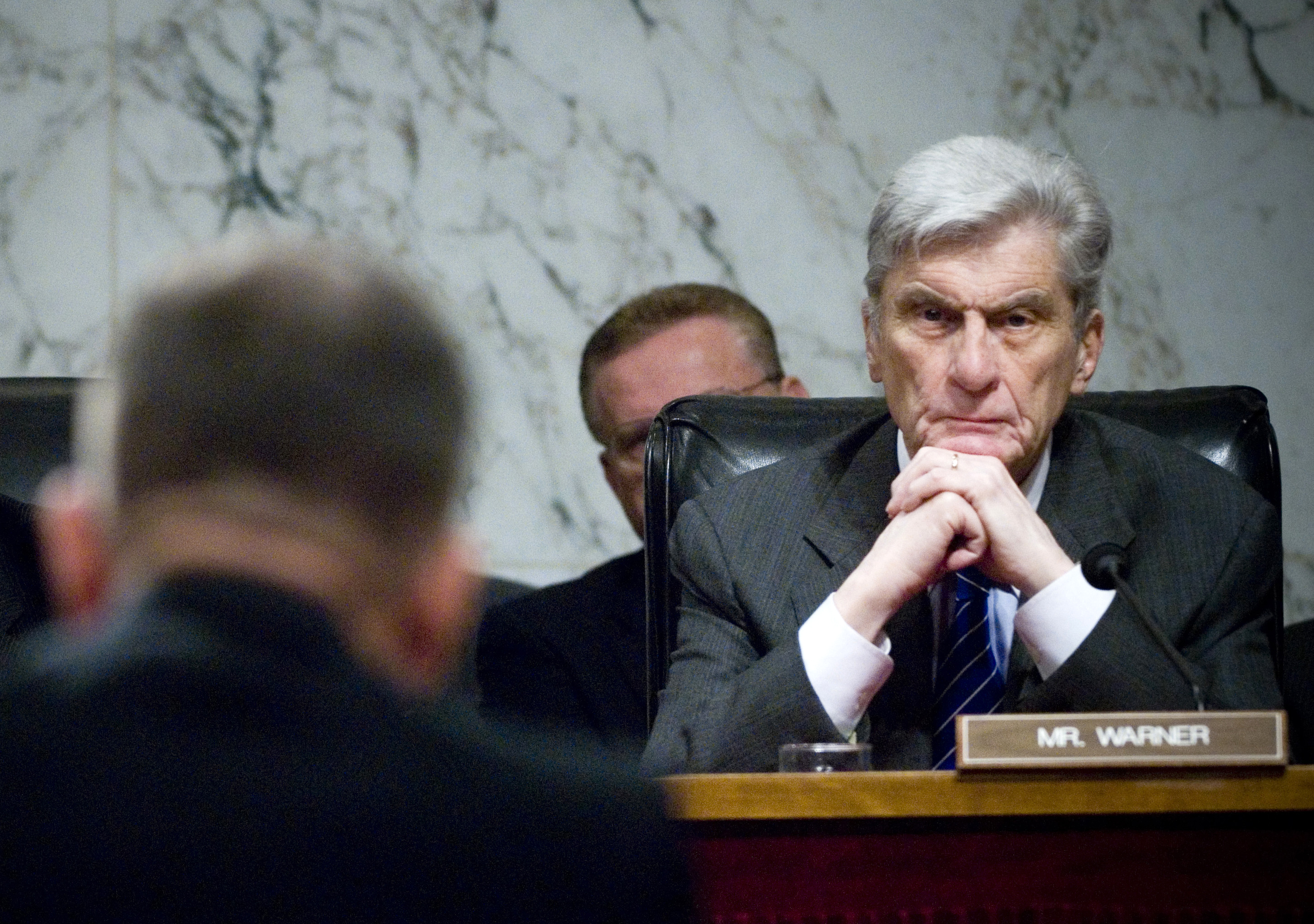
Republican Senator John Warner chose to retire after five terms.

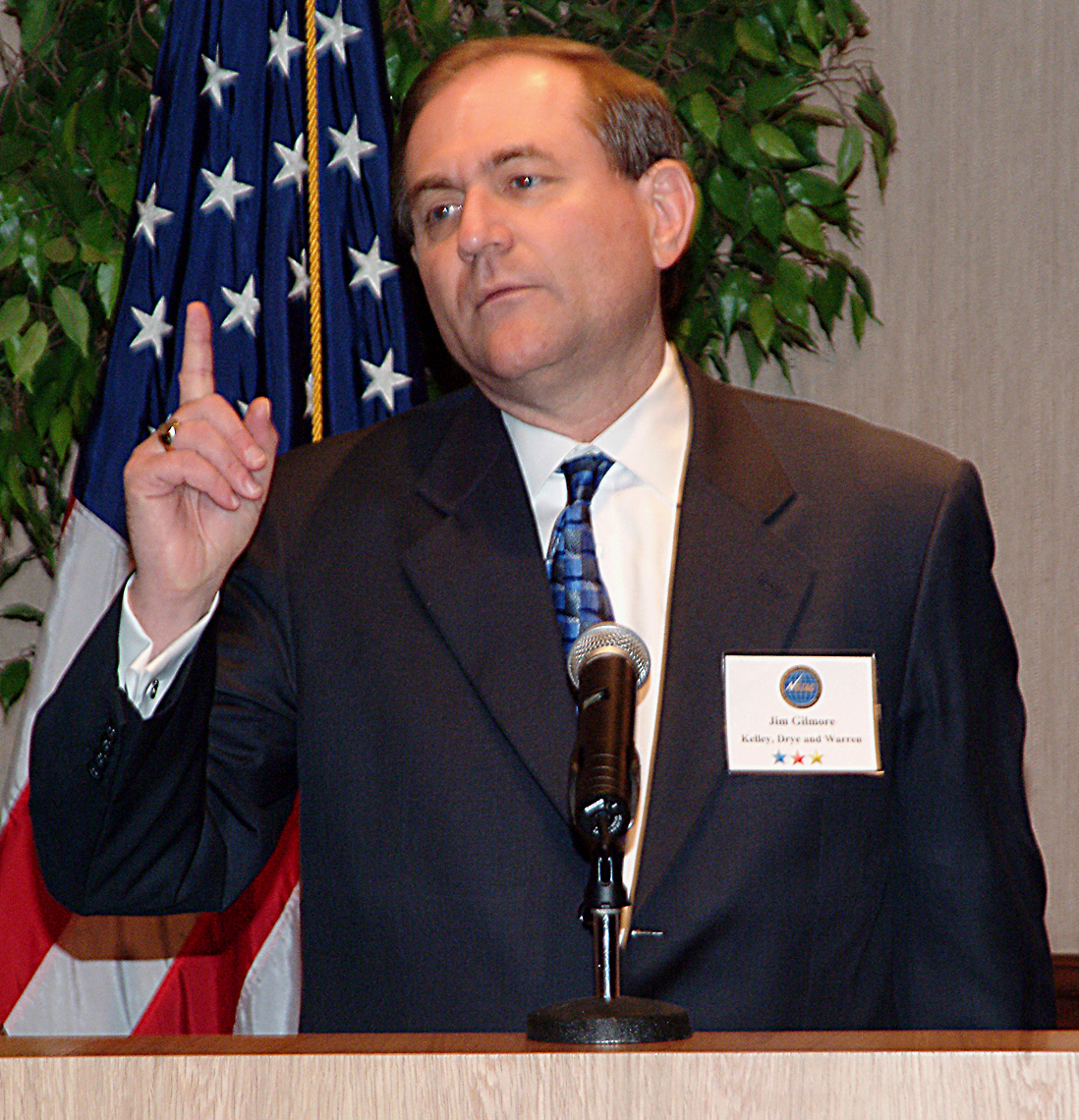
Former Gov. Jim Gilmore (R)

After the conclusions of the state conventions, Democrat Mark Warner had emerged as the front-runner for the general election. Some early polling showed Mark Warner leading Jim Gilmore by as much as 2–1. Pundits and analysts believed Virginia to be the single strongest pickup opportunity for the Democrats due to Warner's consistent lead in the polls. Jim Gilmore responded aggressively, mostly with ads on the Internet; his campaign had very little money. Gilmore attacked Warner for raising taxes during his term as governor, when he had pledged not to do so, flip-flopping among many other topics.

On October 6, Warner and Gilmore debated various issues, including the Emergency Economic Stabilization Act of 2008, the Iraq War and judicial nominees. The Richmond Times Dispatch sponsored the debate held at the Taubman Museum of Art, Roanoke, Virginia.

Mark Warner argued he'd be part of a radical centrist coalition, no matter who won the presidency. He claimed the coalition would improve cooperation in the Congress and its subsequent public perception. Warner spoke of alternative energy, and Gilmore argued for offshore drilling. The issue of the 2004 tax increase under then-Governor Mark Warner was raised at the first debate of the campaign between Gilmore and Warner.

The Washington Post reported on July 24 that Gilmore "submitted false information on two financial disclosure forms that hid his ties to a government contractor embroiled in a legal dispute over allegations that two of its executives had conspired to defraud the federal government." The Gilmore campaign responded by saying, the controversy was due to a "clerical error."

On election night, Warner was declared the winner based on exit polls alone, before the votes were counted.

=== Fundraising ===
Money played a large role in the campaign. By July, Mark Warner had raised $9 million, while Jim Gilmore had raised $1.2 million. This does not include money from the DSCC or NRSC.

=== Endorsements ===
==== Mark Warner ====
- Bristol Herald-Courier
- Daily Press (Newport News)
- Danville Register & Bee
- Fredericksburg Free Lance-Star
- Loudoun Times-Mirror
- Martinsville Bulletin
- The News & Advance (Lynchburg)
- The Roanoke Times
- The Virginian-Pilot (Norfolk)
- The Washington Post

==== Jim Gilmore ====
- Richmond Times-Dispatch

=== Predictions ===
Source	Ranking	As of
The Cook Political Report	Likely D (flip)	October 23, 2008
CQ Politics	Safe D (flip)	October 31, 2008
Rothenberg Political Report	Likely D (flip)	November 2, 2008
Real Clear Politics	Safe D (flip)	November 1, 2008

=== Polling ===
Aggregate polls

Source of poll aggregation	Dates administered	Dates updated	Jim Gilmore (R)	Mark Warner (D)	Other/Undecided (Note: Calculated by taking the difference of 100% and all other candidates combined.)	Margin
RealClearPolitics	October 25–November 1, 2008	November 1, 2008	32.7%	61.3%	6.0%	Warner +28.6%
Rasmussen Reports	October 30, 2007–October 16, 2008	October 16, 2008	34.0%	60.0%	6.0%	Warner +26.0%
Average			33.4%	60.7%	5.9%	Warner +27.4%

Poll source	Date(s) administered	Sample size (Note: Key: A – all adults RV – registered voters LV – likely voters V – unclear)	Margin of error	Jim Gilmore (R)	Mark Warner (D)	Other	Undecided
Public Policy Polling (D)	October 31–November 2, 2008	1,557 (LV)	± 2.5%	36%	62%	–	2%
SurveyUSA (Note: Sponsored by WDBJ Roanoke, WJHL-TV Tri-Cities, WJLA-TV Washington, WTVR-TV Richmond)	October 30–November 1, 2008	672 (LV)	± 3.8%	35%	59%	5% (Note: Glenda Parker (G) with 3% and William Redpath (L) with 2%.)	2%
Mason-Dixon Polling & Strategy	October 29–30, 2008	625 (LV)	± 4.0%	31%	62%	–	7%
SurveyUSA (Note: Sponsored by WDBJ Roanoke, WJHL-TV Tri-Cities, WJLA-TV Washington, WTVR-TV Richmond)	October 25–26, 2008	671 (LV)	± 3.7%	32%	63%	2% (Note: Glenda Parker (G) with 1% and William Redpath (L) with 1%.)	2%
The Associated Press	October 22–26, 2008	601 (LV)	± 3.5%	32%	58%	2% (Note: Glenda Parker (G) with 1% and William Redpath (L) with 1%.)	18%
The Washington Post	October 22–25, 2008	784 (LV)	± 3.5%	31%	61%	–	8%
Virginia Commonwealth University	October 20–22, 2008	817 (LV)	± 4.0%	27%	61%	–	12%
Virginia Commonwealth University	October 20–22, 2008	902 (RV)	± 4.0%	25%	59%	–	16%
Mason-Dixon Polling & Strategy	October 20–21, 2008	625 (LV)	± 4.0%	33%	58%	–	9%
SurveyUSA (Note: Sponsored by WDBJ Roanoke, WJHL-TV Tri-Cities, WJLA-TV Washington, WTVR-TV Richmond)	October 18–19, 2008	652 (LV)	± 3.8%	36%	60%	2% (Note: Glenda Parker (G) with 1% and William Redpath (L) with 1%.)	2%
Rasmussen Reports	October 16, 2008	700 (LV)	± 4.0%	36%	61%	–	3%
Suffolk University	October 3–5, 2008	600 (LV)	–	25%	57%	3% (Note: Glenda Parker (G) with 1% and "Refused" with 2%.)	15%
Mason-Dixon Polling & Strategy	September 9–October 1, 2008	625 (LV)	± 4.0%	31%	57%	–	11%
Rasmussen Reports	September 25, 2008	700 (LV)	–	34%	60%	–	6%
Mason-Dixon Polling & Strategy	September 17–22, 2008	625 (LV)	± 4.0%	28%	61%	–	11%
SurveyUSA (Note: Sponsored by WDBJ Roanoke, WJHL-TV Tri-Cities, WJLA-TV Washington, WTVR-TV Richmond)	September 19–21, 2008	716 (LV)	± 3.7%	34%	57%	6% (Note: Glenda Parker (G) with 3% and William Redpath (L) with 3%.)	3%
The Washington Post/ABC News	September 18–21, 2008	857 (RV)	± 3.0%	29%	61%	5% (Note: Glenda Parker (G) with 2%, William Redpath (L) with 1%, "None" with 1%, and "Would not vote" with 1%.)	5%
The Washington Post/ABC News	September 18–21, 2008	698 (LV)	± 4.0%	31%	61%	4% (Note: Glenda Parker (G) with 1%, William Redpath (L) with 1%, "None" with 1%, and "Would not vote" with 1%.)	4%
Public Policy Polling (D)	September 13–14, 2008	1,090 (LV)	± 3.0%	33%	57%	–	10%
Christopher Newport University	September 10–14, 2008	500 (V)	± 4.4%	30%	54%	–	16%
SurveyUSA (Note: Sponsored by WDBJ Roanoke, WJHL-TV Tri-Cities, WJLA-TV Washington, WTVR-TV Richmond)	September 12–14, 2008	732 (LV)	± 3.7%	34%	57%	5% (Note: Glenda Parker (G) with 4% and William Redpath (L) with 1%.)	3%
SurveyUSA (Note: Sponsored by WDBJ Roanoke, WJHL-TV Tri-Cities, WJLA-TV Washington, WTVR-TV Richmond)	September 5–7, 2008	717 (LV)	± 3.7%	35%	56%	7% (Note: Glenda Parker (G) with 4% and William Redpath (L) with 3%.)	3%
Public Policy Polling (D)	August 20–22, 2008	1,036 (LV)	± 3.0%	32%	55%	–	13%
Rasmussen Reports	August 12, 2008	700 (LV)	± 4.5%	35%	61%	–	5%
Rasmussen Reports	July 16, 2008	500 (LV)	± 4.5%	36%	59%	–	5%
Public Policy Polling (D)	June 14–16, 2008	893 (LV)	± 3.3%	28%	59%	–	13%
Rasmussen Reports	June 12, 2008	500 (LV)	± 4.5%	33%	60%	2%	5%
Rasmussen Reports	May 8, 2008	500 (LV)	± 4.5%	37%	55%	3%	4%
Rasmussen Reports	March 26, 2008	500 (LV)	± 4.5%	39%	55%	3%	4%
Rasmussen Reports	February 19, 2008	500 (LV)	± 4.5%	37%	57%	–	6%
Rasmussen Reports	January 2, 2008	500 (LV)	± 4.5%	38%	53%	5%	4%
SurveyUSA (Note: Sponsored by Roll Call)	October 27–30, 2007	644 (RV)	± 3.9%	35%	57%	–	8%
Rasmussen Reports	October 24, 2007	500 (LV)	± 4.5%	37%	53%	6%	4%
The Washington Post	October 4–8, 2007	1,144 (A)	± 4.0%	31%	61%	3% (Note: Neither with 3%.)	5%
Christopher Newport University	September 27–October 1, 2007	700 (RV)	± 3.7%	27%	51%	–	22%
SurveyUSA (Note: Sponsored by WLJA-TV Washington DC, WTVR-TV Richmond, WAVY-TV Norfolk, WDBJ Roanoke)	September 14–16, 2007	783 (RV)	± 3.5%	32%	60%	–	8%
Rasmussen Reports	September 5, 2007	500 (LV)	± 4.5%	34%	54%	2%	9%

== Results ==
2008 United States Senate election in Virginia
Party	Candidate	Votes	%	±%
Democratic	Mark Warner	2,369,327	65.03%	+65.03%
Republican	Jim Gilmore	1,228,830	33.73%	−48.84%
Independent Greens	Glenda Parker	21,690	0.60%	+0.60%
Libertarian	Bill Redpath	20,269	0.56%	+0.56%
Write-in		3,178	0.09%	-0.47%
Total votes		3,643,294	100.00%	N/A
Democratic gain from Republican				

=== Counties and independent cities that flipped from Republican to Democratic ===
- Accomack (largest city: Chincoteague)
- Amelia (no municipalities)
- Amherst (largest city: Amherst)
- Appomattox (largest city: Appomattox)
- Bath (largest city: Hot Springs)
- Bedford (largest city: Bedford)
- Bland (largest city: Bland)
- Botetourt (largest city: Cloverdale)
- Buckingham (largest city: Dillwyn)
- Buchanan (largest city: Grundy)
- Buena Vista (independent city)
- Bristol (independent city)
- Campbell (largest city: Altavista)
- Carroll (largest city: Hillsville)
- Charlotte (largest city: Keysville)
- Chesapeake (independent city)
- Chesterfield (no municipalities)
- Clarke (largest city: Berryville)
- Craig (largest city: New Castle)
- Cumberland (largest city: Farmville)
- Culpeper (largest borough: Culpeper)
- Dickenson (largest borough: Clintwood)
- Dinwiddie (largest town: McKenney)
- Essex (largest city: Tappahannock)
- Emporia (independent city)
- Fauquier (largest city: Warrenton)
- Floyd (largest city: Floyd)
- Franklin (largest city: Rocky Mount)
- Fluvanna (largest city: Monticello)
- Galax (independent city)
- Giles (largest city: Pearisburg)
- Frederick (largest city: Winchester)
- Gloucester (largest city: Gloucester Point)
- Goochland (no municipalities)
- Grayson (largest city: Independence)
- Greene (largest city: Twin Lakes)
- Halifax (largest city: South Boston)
- Henry (largest city: Martinsville)
- Highland (largest city: Monterey)
- Isle of Wight (largest city: Smithfield)
- James City (no municipalities)
- King and Queen (largest city: King and Queen Courthouse)
- King George (largest city: King George)
- King William (largest city: West Point)
- Lancaster (largest city: Kilmarnock)
- Lee (largest city: Pennington Gap)
- Loudoun (largest city: Leesburg)
- Louisa (largest city: Louisa)
- Lunenburg (largest city: Victoria)
- Lexington (independent city)
- Lynchburg (independent city)
- Madison (largest city: Madison)
- Matthews (no municipalities)
- Mecklenburg (largest city: South Hill)
- Middlesex (largest city: Urbanna)
- Northumberland (largest city: Heathsville)
- New Kent (no municipalities)
- Norton (independent city)
- Radford (independent city)
- Nottoway (largest city: Blackstone)
- Orange (largest city: Orange)
- Page (largest city: Luray)
- Patrick (largest city: Stuart)
- Pittsylvania (largest city: Chatham)
- Prince George (largest city: Fort Gregg-Adams)
- Pulaski (largest city: Pulaski)
- Salem (independent city)
- Staunton (independent city)
- Rappahannock (largest city: Washington)
- Richmond (largest city: Warsaw)
- Roanoke (largest city: Vinton)
- Rockbridge (largest city: Lexington)
- Russell (largest city: Lebanon)
- Scott (largest city: Gate City)
- Shenandoah (largest city: Strasburg)
- Smyth (largest city: Marion)
- Southampton (largest municipality: Courtland)
- Spotsylvania (largest municipality: Spotsylvania Courthoouse)
- Stafford (no municipalities)
- Tazewell (largest city: Richlands)
- Warren (largest city: Front Royal)
- Washington (largest city: Abingdon)
- Wise (largest city: Big Stone Gap)
- Westmoreland (largest city: Colonial Beach)
- Winchester (independent city)
- Virginia Beach (independent city)
- Waynesboro (independent city)
- Wythe (largest city: Wytheville)
- York (largest city: Grafton)
- Albemarle (largest municipality: Scottsville)
- Fairfax (largest municipality: Herndon)
- Nelson (largest municipality: Nellysford)
- Prince Edward (largest municipality: Farmville)
- Danville (independent city)
- Fairfax (independent city)
- Williamsburg (independent city)
- Caroline (largest borough: Bowling Green)
- Harrisonburg (independent city)
- Henrico (largest borough: Richmond)
- Hopewell (independent city)
- Manassas (independent city)
- Manassas Park (independent city)
- Montgomery (largest borough: Blacksburg)
- Prince William (largest borough: Manassas)
- Suffolk (independent city)
- Covington (independent city)
- Martinsville (independent city)
- Brunswick (largest borough: Lawrenceville)
- Charlottesville (independent city)
- Northampton (largest borough: Exmore)
- Surry (no municipalities)
- Emporia (independent city)
- Roanoke (independent city)
- Richmond (independent city)
- Falls Church (independent city)
- Norfolk (independent city)
- Hampton (independent city)
- Portsmouth (independent city)
- Newsport News (independent city)
- Alexandria (independent city)
- Buena Vista (independent city)
- Alleghany (largest borough: Clinfton Forge)
- Arlington (no municipalities)
- Greensville (largest city: Jarratt)
- Sussex (largest city: Waverly)
- Petersburg (independent city)
- Charles City (no municipalities)
- Franklin (largest city: Rocky Mount)

== See also ==
- 2008 Virginia elections
- 2008 United States presidential election in Virginia
- 2008 United States House of Representatives elections in Virginia

== Notes ==
Partisan clients
