= 1990 United States Senate election in Virginia =

- November 5, 1990
- Turnout: 25.5% (voting eligible)
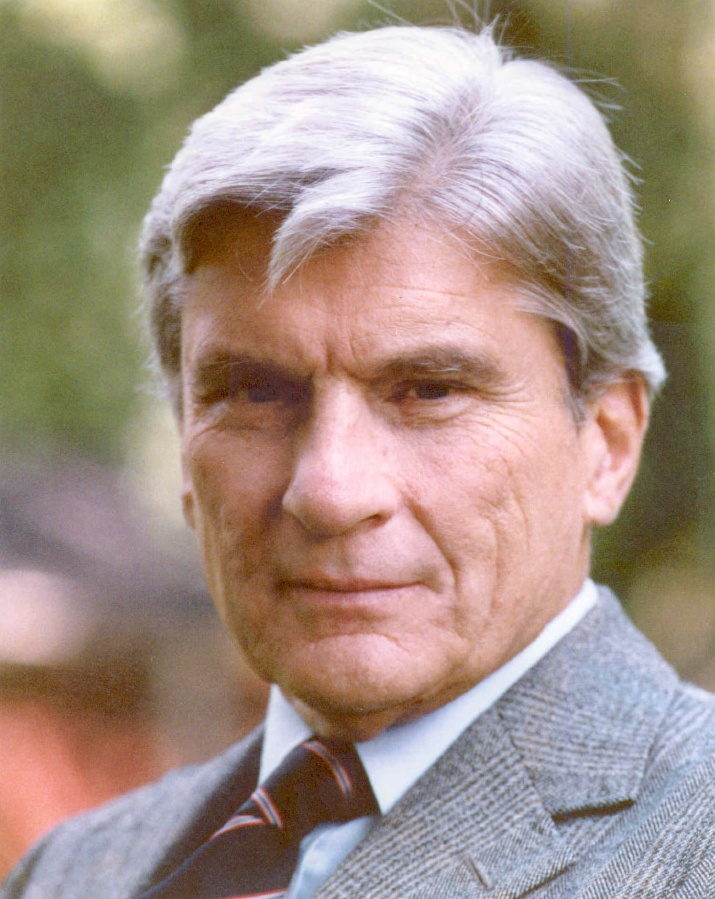

| Nominee | John Warner | Nancy Spannaus |
| Party | Republican | Independent |
| Popular vote | 876,782 | 196,755 |
| Percentage | 80.91% | 18.16% |
- Warner: 60–70% 70–80% 80–90% >90%
U.S. senator before election
John Warner
Republican
Elected U.S. Senator
John Warner
Republican

The 1990 United States Senate election in Virginia took place on November 5, 1990. Incumbent Republican U.S. Senator John W. Warner won re-election to a third term. No Democrat filed to run against him as he won every single county and city in the state with over 60% of the vote. Independent Nancy B. Spannaus (an affiliate of the controversial Lyndon LaRouche) got 18% of the vote, as she was the only other candidate on the ballot besides Warner.

== Results ==
County Flips: Republican Hold Flip

United States Senate election in Virginia, 1990
| Party | Candidate | Votes | % | ±% |
|---|---|---|---|---|
| Republican | John Warner (incumbent) | 876,782 | 80.91% | +10.86% |
| Independent | Nancy Spannaus | 196,755 | 18.16% | |
| Write-ins | | 10,153 | 0.94% | +0.93% |
| Majority | | 680,027 | 62.75% | +22.65% |
| Turnout | | 1,083,690 | | |
| Republican hold | | Swing | | |

== See also ==
- 1990 United States Senate elections
