= Twin Lakes, Virginia =

- Census-designated place
- Karte Location of the Twin Lakes CDP within the Greene County

- Location within Virginia Location within the United States
- Coordinates: 38°14′56″N 78°26′37″W
- Country: United States
- State: Virginia
- County: Greene

Area
  - Total: 1.28 sq mi (3.32 km^{2})
  - Land: 1.19 sq mi (3.08 km^{2})
  - Water: 0.093 sq mi (0.24 km^{2})
- Elevation: 585 ft (178 m)

Population (2010)
  - Total: 1,647
  - Density: 1,385/sq mi (534.7/km^{2})
- Time zone: UTC−5 (Eastern (EST))
  - Summer (DST): UTC−4 (EDT)
- ZIP code: 22968
- FIPS code: 51-79768
- GNIS feature ID: 2629848

Twin Lakes is a census-designated place in Greene County, Virginia, United States. As of the 2020 census, Twin Lakes had a population of 1,602.

== Geography ==
Twin Lakes is located in southern Greene County around a set of small reservoirs built on Quarter Creek, a southwest-flowing tributary of Swift Run, which in turn runs south to the North Fork of the Rivanna River, part of the James River watershed. The community is 4 miles (6 km) south of Stanardsville, the Greene County seat, and 21 miles (34 km) north of Charlottesville.

According to the U.S. Census Bureau, the Twin Lakes CDP has a total area of 1.3 square miles (3.3 km^{2}), of which 1.2 square miles (3.1 km^{2}) are land and 0.1 square miles (0.2 km^{2}), or 7.28%, are water.

== Demographics ==
Historical population
Census	Pop.	Note	%±
2010	1,647		—
2020	1,602		−2.7%
U.S. Decennial Census; 2010 2020

Twin Lakes was first listed as a census designated place in the 2010 U.S. census.

=== 2020 census ===
As of the 2020 census, Twin Lakes had a population of 1,602. The median age was 35.4 years. 27.5% of residents were under the age of 18 and 11.3% of residents were 65 years of age or older. For every 100 females there were 85.6 males, and for every 100 females age 18 and over there were 76.6 males age 18 and over.

0.0% of residents lived in urban areas, while 100.0% lived in rural areas.

There were 544 households in Twin Lakes, of which 38.1% had children under the age of 18 living in them. Of all households, 52.6% were married-couple households, 16.9% were households with a male householder and no spouse or partner present, and 21.0% were households with a female householder and no spouse or partner present. About 20.0% of all households were made up of individuals and 8.4% had someone living alone who was 65 years of age or older.

There were 569 housing units, of which 4.4% were vacant. The homeowner vacancy rate was 1.3% and the rental vacancy rate was 0.0%.

Racial composition as of the 2020 census
Race	Number	Percent
White	1,220	76.2%
Black or African American	162	10.1%
American Indian and Alaska Native	7	0.4%
Asian	21	1.3%
Native Hawaiian and Other Pacific Islander	0	0.0%
Some other race	68	4.2%
Two or more races	124	7.7%
Hispanic or Latino (of any race)	113	7.1%
