= 2001 Virginia lieutenant gubernatorial election =

- November 5, 2001
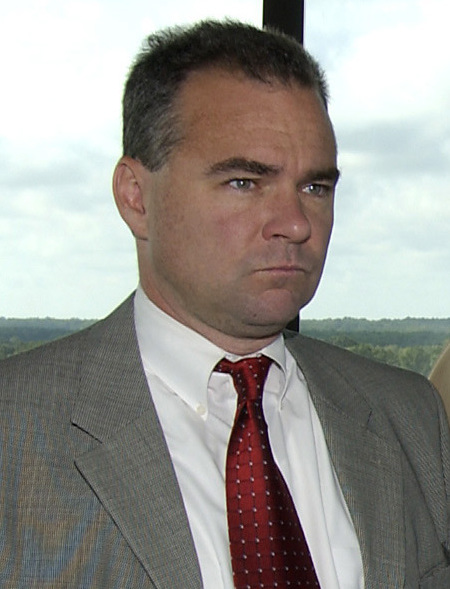

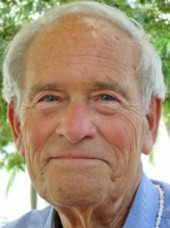
Nominee	Tim Kaine	Jay Katzen
Party	Democratic	Republican
Popular vote	925,974	883,886
Percentage	50.34%	48.05%
- Kaine: 40–50% 50–60% 60–70% 70–80% 80–90% Katzen: 40–50% 50–60% 60–70%
Lieutenant-Governor before election
John H. Hager
Republican
Elected Lieutenant-Governor
Tim Kaine
Democratic

The 2001 Virginia lieutenant gubernatorial election was held on November 6, 2001, to elect the lieutenant governor of Virginia. Former Mayor of Richmond, Tim Kaine, defeated Jay Katzen by 2.29%.

== Democratic Primary ==
=== Candidates ===
==== Nominee ====
- Tim Kaine, former mayor of Richmond (1998–2001)

==== Eliminated in primary ====
- Alan Diamonstein, state delegate from the 94th district (1968–2002), former chair of the Virginia Democratic Party (1982–1985)
- Jerrauld Jones, state delegate from the 89th district (1988–2002)

==== Withdrawn ====
- Emily Couric, state senator from the 25th district (1996–2001), chair of the Virginia Democratic Party (2000–2001)

Democratic Primary Results
Party	Candidate	Votes	%
Democratic	Tim Kaine	64,008	39.66%
Democratic	Alan Diamonstein	50,753	31.45%
Democratic	Jerrauld Jones	46,640	28.90%
Total votes		161,401	100.00%

== Republican Primary ==
=== Candidates ===
==== Nominee ====
- Jay Katzen, state delegate from the 31st district (1994–2002)

== General election ==
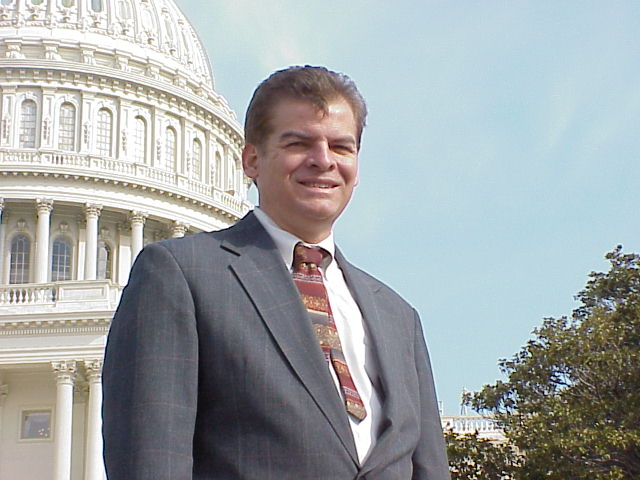
Libertarian candidate Gary Reams

Candidates

- Tim Kaine (Democratic), Former Mayor of Richmond
- Jay Katzen (Republican), State Delegate
- Gary Reams (Libertarian)

2001 Virginia lieutenant gubernatorial election
Party	Candidate	Votes	%	±%
Democratic	Tim Kaine	925,974	50.34%	
Republican	Jay Katzen	883,886	48.05%	
Libertarian	Gary Reams	28,783	1.56%	
Write-ins		490	0.02%	
Turnout		1,839,133		
Democratic gain from Republican		Swing		

== See also ==
- 2001 Virginia gubernatorial election
- 2001 Virginia Attorney General election
- 2001 Virginia House of Delegates election
- 2001 Virginia elections
- 2001 United States elections
