= Tim Kaine =

American lawyer and politician (born 1958)

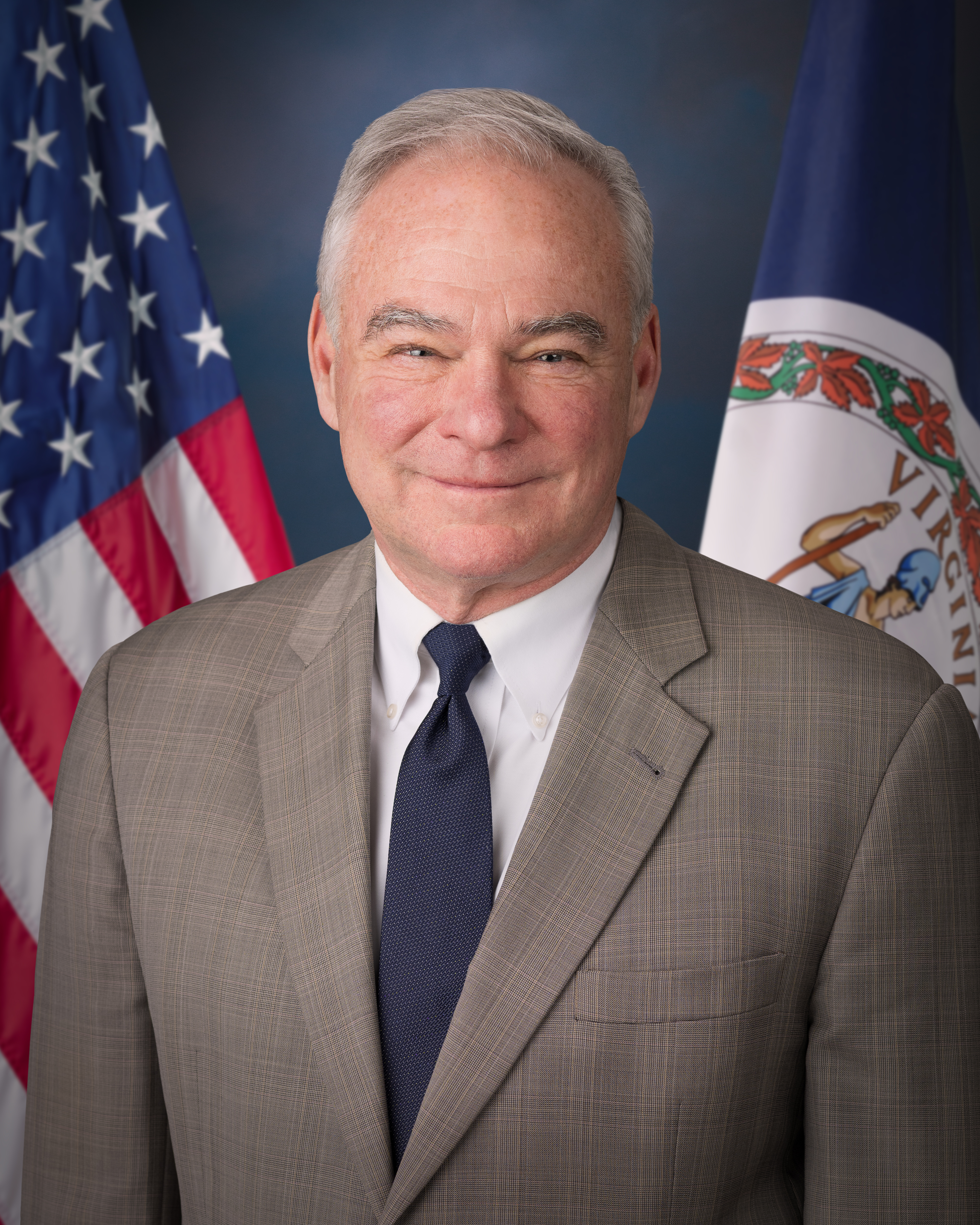
- Official portrait, 2025

United States Senator from Virginia
- Incumbent
- Assumed office January 3, 2013 Serving with Mark Warner
- Preceded by: Jim Webb

Chair of the Democratic National Committee
- In office January 21, 2009 – April 5, 2011
- Preceded by: Howard Dean
- Succeeded by: Donna Brazile (acting)

70th Governor of Virginia
- In office January 14, 2006 – January 16, 2010
- Lieutenant: Bill Bolling
- Preceded by: Mark Warner
- Succeeded by: Bob McDonnell

38th Lieutenant Governor of Virginia
- In office January 12, 2002 – January 14, 2006
- Governor: Mark Warner
- Preceded by: John H. Hager
- Succeeded by: Bill Bolling

76th Mayor of Richmond
- In office July 1, 1998 – September 10, 2001
- Preceded by: Larry Chavis
- Succeeded by: Rudy McCollum

Member of the Richmond City Council from the 2nd district
- In office July 1, 1994 – September 10, 2001
- Preceded by: Benjamin Warthen
- Succeeded by: William Pantele

Personal details
- Born: Timothy Michael Kaine; February 26, 1958 (age 68) Saint Paul, Minnesota, U.S.
- Party: Democratic
- Spouse: Anne Holton (m. 1984)
- Children: 3
- Education: University of Missouri (BA); Harvard University (JD)
- Website: Senate website Campaign website
- Kaine's voice Kaine on a need to end "apathy as usual" in regards to racism in America. Recorded June 16, 2020

Timothy Michael Kaine (/keɪn/ KAYN; born February 26, 1958) is an American lawyer and politician serving as the junior United States senator from Virginia, a seat he has held since 2013. A member of the Democratic Party, he served from 2006 to 2010 as the 70th governor of Virginia and from 2002 to 2006 as the 38th lieutenant governor of Virginia. Kaine was the Democratic vice-presidential nominee in the 2016 presidential election, running alongside presidential nominee Hillary Clinton.

Born in Saint Paul, Minnesota, Kaine grew up in Overland Park, Kansas. He graduated from the University of Missouri and earned a Juris Doctor degree from Harvard Law School. Afterward, he entered private practice and became a lecturer at the University of Richmond School of Law. He was first elected to public office in 1994, when he won a seat on the Richmond city council. He was elected mayor of Richmond in 1998, holding that position until being elected lieutenant governor of Virginia in 2001.

Kaine was elected governor of Virginia in 2005 and held that office from 2006 to 2010. He chaired the Democratic National Committee from 2009 to 2011. In 2012, Kaine was elected to the U.S. Senate, defeating former Virginia governor and senator George Allen. He was reelected to a second term by a wide margin in 2018, defeating Republican nominee Corey Stewart, and to a third term in 2024, defeating Republican nominee Hung Cao.

In 2016, Hillary Clinton selected Kaine as her running mate in that year's presidential election. While winning a plurality of the national popular vote, their ticket lost the Electoral College, and therefore the general election, to the Republican ticket of Donald Trump and Mike Pence.

== Early life and education ==
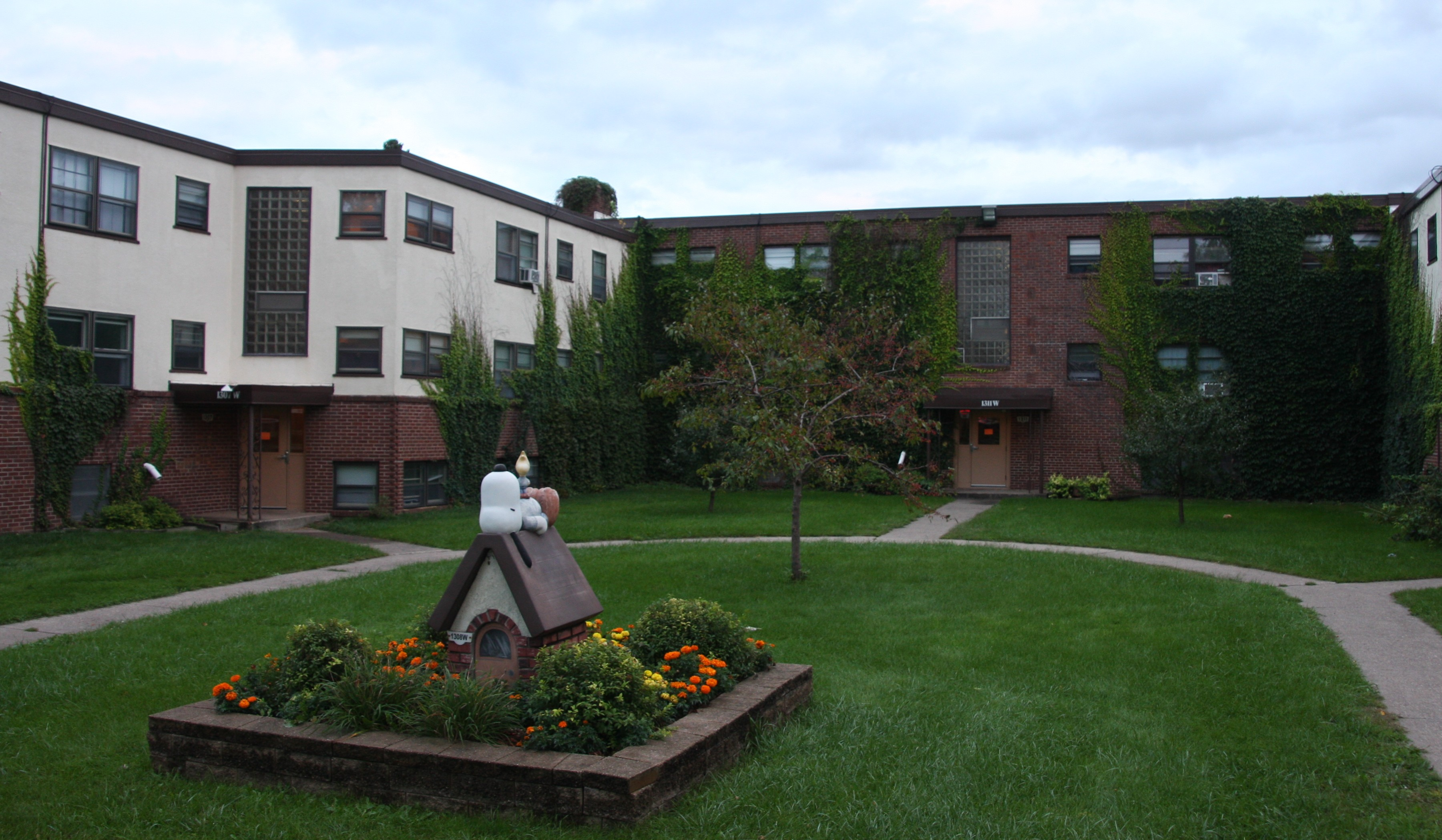
Apartment building where Kaine's family lived when he was born

Kaine was born at Saint Joseph's Hospital in Saint Paul, Minnesota. He is the eldest of three sons born to Mary Kathleen (née Burns), a home economics teacher, and Albert Alexander Kaine Jr., a welder and the owner of a small iron-working shop. He was raised Catholic. One of Kaine's great-grandparents was Scottish and the other seven were Irish. Kaine's family moved to Overland Park, Kansas, when Kaine was two years old, and he grew up in the Kansas City area. In 1976, he graduated from Rockhurst High School, a Jesuit all-boys preparatory school in Kansas City, Missouri. At Rockhurst, Kaine joined the debate team and was elected student body president.

Kaine received his Bachelor of Arts in economics from the University of Missouri in 1979, completing his degree in three years and graduating Omicron Delta Kappa and summa cum laude. He was a Coro Foundation fellow in Kansas City in 1978. He entered Harvard Law School in 1979, interrupting his law studies after his first year to work in Honduras (Note: Many news reports say that Kaine worked in Honduras as part of the Jesuit Volunteer Corps, a U.S.-based organization that did not sponsor overseas programs until 1984. By his own account, while a high school student in 1974 Kaine visited a Jesuit mission in Honduras that had ties to his Jesuit high school. In 1980, after completing his first year of law school and without the support of any organization, he contacted that mission and arranged to work at its vocational training school as a volunteer teacher.) for nine months from 1980 to 1981, helping Jesuit missionaries who ran a Catholic school in El Progreso. While running a vocational center that taught carpentry and welding, he also helped increase the school's enrollment by recruiting local villagers. Kaine is fluent in Spanish as a result of his time in Honduras.

After returning from Honduras, Kaine met his future wife, first-year Harvard Law student Anne Holton. He graduated from Harvard Law School with a J.D. degree in 1983. Kaine and Holton moved to Holton's hometown of Richmond, Virginia, after graduation, and Kaine was admitted to the Virginia bar in 1984.

== Legal career and Richmond City Council ==
After graduating from law school, Kaine was a law clerk for Judge R. Lanier Anderson III of the United States Court of Appeals for the Eleventh Circuit, in Macon, Georgia. He then joined the Richmond law firm of Little, Parsley & Cluverius, P.C. In 1987, Kaine became a director of the law firm of Mezzullo & McCandlish, P.C. He practiced law in Richmond for 17 years, specializing in fair housing law and representing clients discriminated against on the basis of race or disability. He was a board member of the Virginia chapter of Housing Opportunities Made Equal, which he represented in a landmark redlining discrimination lawsuit against Nationwide Mutual Insurance Co. arising from the company's practices in Richmond. Kaine won a $100.5 million verdict in the case; the judgment was overturned on appeal, and Kaine and his colleagues negotiated a $17.5 million settlement.

Kaine did regular pro bono work. In 1988, he started teaching legal ethics as an adjunct professor at the University of Richmond School of Law. Kaine taught at the University of Richmond for six years; his students included future Virginia attorney general Mark Herring. He was a founding member of the Virginia Coalition to End Homelessness.

Kaine had a largely apolitical childhood, but he became interested in politics in part due to the influence of his wife's family and his experience attending Richmond city council meetings. In 1994, he was elected the 2nd district member of the city council of the independent city of Richmond, defeating incumbent city councilor Benjamin P.A. Warthen by 97 votes. He took his seat on July 1 and retained the position until September 10, 2001, when he resigned; William J. Pantele was appointed to succeed him. Kaine spent four terms on the city council, the latter two as mayor of Richmond.

== Mayor of Richmond (1998–2001) ==
On July 1, 1998, Kaine was elected mayor of Richmond, succeeding Larry Chavis. The majority-black Richmond City Council (Note: Until 2004, the mayor of Richmond was chosen by the city council from among its membership; under the present system, the mayor is chosen by popular vote.) chose him by an 8 to 1 vote, making him the city's first white mayor in more than ten years, which was viewed as a surprise. Rudy McCollum, an African American city councilor also interested in the mayoralty, decided to back Kaine after a private meeting between the two, clearing the way for him. Previous mayors had treated the role as primarily ceremonial, with the city manager effectively operating the city; Kaine treated it as a full-time job, taking a more hands-on role.

As mayor, Kaine used a sale-leaseback arrangement to obtain funds to renovate the historic Maggie L. Walker High School and reopen it in 2000 as a magnet governor's school, the Maggie L. Walker Governor's School for Government and International Studies, which "now serves the top students in Central Virginia". Three elementary schools and one middle school were also built in Richmond under Kaine. Along with Commonwealth's attorney David Hicks, U.S. attorney James Comey, and police chief Jerry Oliver, Kaine supported Project Exile, an initiative that shifted gun crimes to federal court, where defendants faced harsher sentences. Though controversial, the effort gained widespread support and the city's homicide rate fell by 55% during Kaine's mayoralty. Kaine touted Project Exile during his 2001 campaign for lieutenant governor.

On several occasions, Kaine voted against tax increases, and he supported a tax abatement program for renovated buildings, which was credited for a housing renovation boom in the city. Forbes magazine named Richmond one of "the 10 best cities in America to do business" during Kaine's term.

According to John Moeser, a professor emeritus of urban studies and planning at Virginia Commonwealth University and later a visiting fellow at the University of Richmond's Center for Civic Engagement, Kaine "was energetic, charismatic and, most important, spoke openly about his commitment to racial reconciliation in Richmond." The New York Times wrote that Kaine "was by all accounts instrumental in bridging the city's racial divide". In the early part of his term, Kaine apologized for Richmond's role in slavery; the apology was generally well received as "a genuine, heartfelt expression". In the latter part of his term, there was a contentious debate over the inclusion of a portrait of Confederate general Robert E. Lee in a set of historic murals to be placed on city floodwalls. Many African Americans were outraged that Lee would appear on city walls, while Southern heritage groups demanded that the picture remain. Kaine proposed a compromise whereby Lee would appear as part of a series of murals that also included figures like Abraham Lincoln and Powhatan Beaty. The NAACP criticized his stance, but Kaine argued that placing Lee on the floodwall made sense in context, and that "Much of our history is not pleasant; you can't whitewash it." His proposal passed the council by a 6–3 vote.

During his mayoralty, Kaine drew criticism for spending $6,000 in public funds on buses to the Million Mom March, an anti-gun-violence rally in Washington, D.C.; after a backlash, he raised the money privately and reimbursed the city.

== Lieutenant governor of Virginia (2002–2006) ==
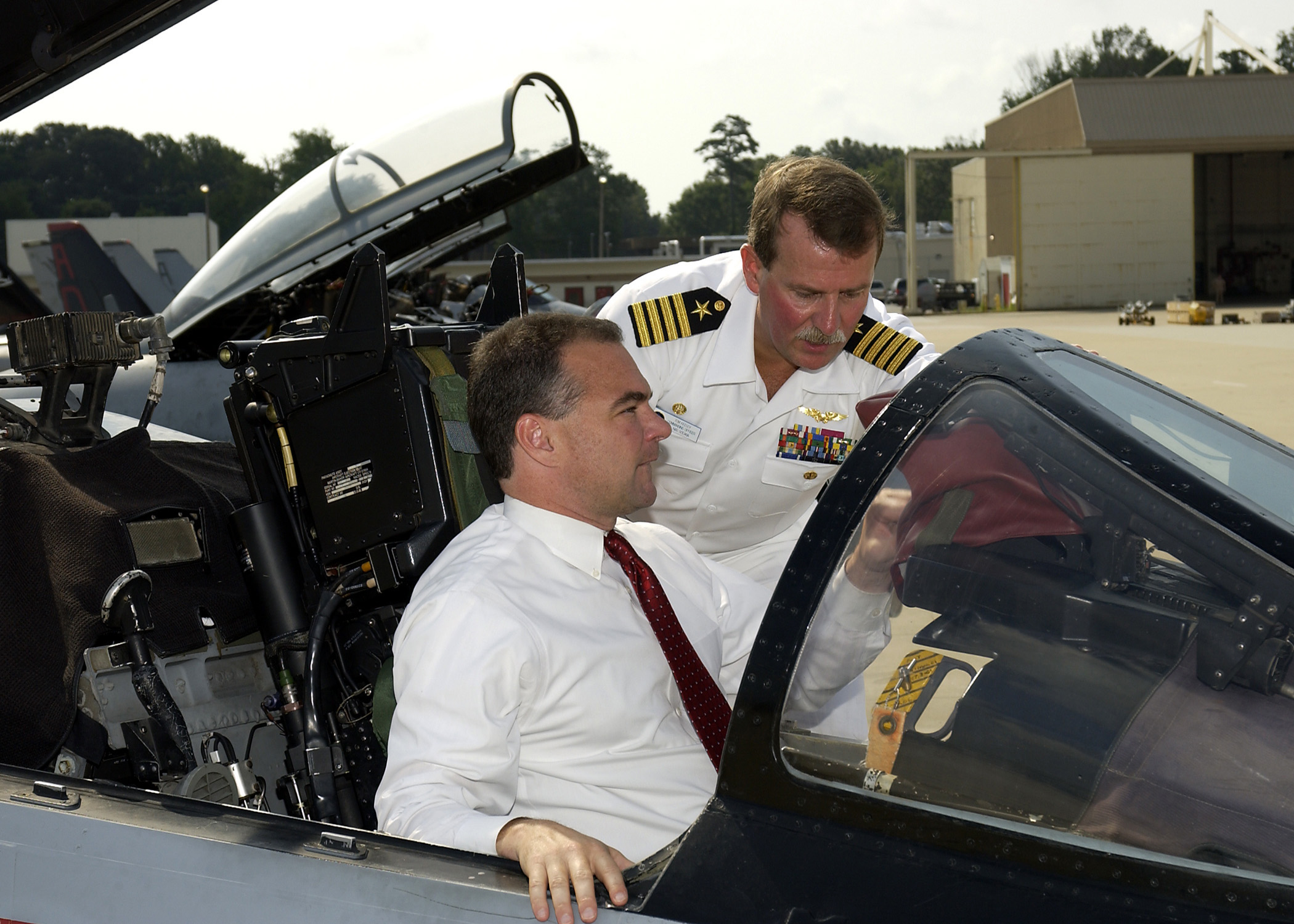
Kaine in an F-14 Tomcat while touring a naval base in 2003

Kaine ran for lieutenant governor of Virginia in 2001. He joined the race after state senator Emily Couric dropped out due to pancreatic cancer and endorsed Kaine as her replacement. In the Democratic primary election, Kaine ran against state delegate Alan A. Diamonstein of Newport News, and state delegate Jerrauld C. Jones of Norfolk. Kaine won the nomination, with 39.7% of the vote to Diamonstein's 31.4% and Jones's 28.9%.

In the general election, Kaine won with 925,974 votes (50.35%), edging out his Republican opponent, state delegate Jay Katzen, who received 883,886 (48.06%). Libertarian Gary Reams received 28,783 votes (1.57%).

Kaine was inaugurated on January 12, 2002, and was sworn in by his wife Anne Holton, a state judge.

== Governor of Virginia (2006–2010) ==
=== Election ===
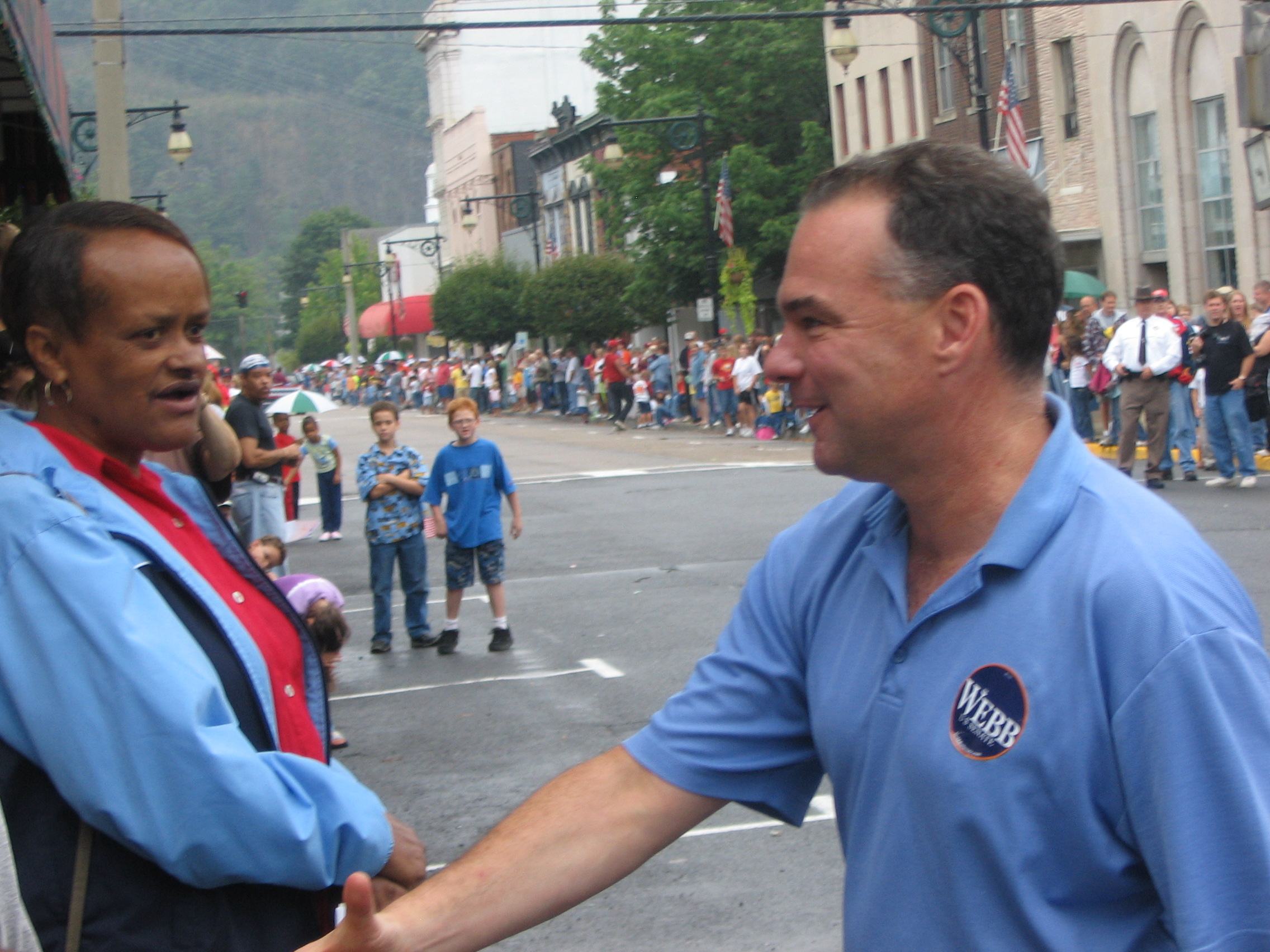
Kaine at the Covington Labor Day Parade in Virginia, September 4, 2006

In 2005, Kaine ran for governor of Virginia against Republican candidate Jerry W. Kilgore, a former state attorney general. Kaine was considered an underdog for most of the race, trailing in polls for most of the campaign. Two September polls showed Kaine trailing Kilgore—by four percentage points in a Washington Post poll and by one point in a Mason-Dixon/Roanoke Times poll. The final polls of the race before the election showed Kaine slightly edging ahead of Kilgore.

Kaine ultimately prevailed, winning 1,025,942 votes (51.7%) to Kilgore's 912,327 (46.0%). A third candidate, independent state Senator H. Russell Potts Jr., ran as an "independent Republican" and received 43,953 votes (2.2%).

Kaine emphasized fiscal responsibility and a centrist message. He expressed support for controlling sprawl and tackling longstanding traffic issues, an issue that resonated in the northern Virginia exurbs. He benefited from his association with the popular outgoing Democratic governor, Mark Warner, who had performed well in traditionally Republican areas of the state. On the campaign trail, Kaine referred to the "Warner-Kaine administration" in speeches and received Warner's strong backing. Kilgore later attributed his defeat to Warner's high popularity and President George W. Bush's sharply declining popularity; Bush held a rally with Kilgore on the campaign's final day.

The campaign turned sharply negative in its final weeks, with Kilgore running television attack ads that falsely claimed that Kaine believed that "Hitler doesn't qualify for the death penalty". The ads also attacked Kaine for his service ten years earlier as a court-appointed attorney for a death-row inmate. The editorial boards of The Washington Post and a number of Virginia newspapers denounced the ads as a "smear" and "dishonest". Kaine responded with an ad "in which he told voters that he opposes capital punishment but would take an oath and enforce the death penalty. In later polls, voters said they believed Kaine's response and were angered by Kilgore's negative ads."

In the election, Kaine won by large margins in the Democratic strongholds such as Richmond and northern Virginia's inner suburbs (such as Alexandria and Arlington), as well as in the Democratic-trending Fairfax County. Kaine also won Republican-leaning areas in Northern Virginia's outer suburbs, including Prince William County and Loudoun County, where George W. Bush had beat John Kerry in the previous year's presidential election, and performed "surprisingly well in Republican strongholds like Virginia Beach and Chesapeake." Kaine also defeated Kilgore in the burgeoning Richmond suburbs. Kilgore led in southwest Virginia and in the Shenandoah Valley.

=== Tenure ===
Kaine was sworn in as governor at the colonial Capitol at Williamsburg, on January 14, 2006, the first governor since Thomas Jefferson to be inaugurated there.

Kaine was chairman of the Southern Governors' Association from 2008 to 2009.

==== Democratic response to State of the Union address ====
On January 31, 2006, Kaine gave the Democratic response to President George W. Bush's 2006 State of the Union address. In it, he criticized the Bush administration's No Child Left Behind Act for "wreaking havoc on local school districts"; criticized congressional Republicans for cutting student loan programs; and condemned as "reckless" Bush's spending increases and tax cuts. Kaine praised bipartisan initiatives in Virginia "to make record investments in education" and to improve veterans' access to veterans' benefits. He criticized the Bush administration's conduct of the Iraq War and treatment of U.S. soldiers, saying that "the American people were given inaccurate information about reasons for invading Iraq"; "our troops in Iraq were not given the best body armor or the best intelligence"; and "the administration wants to further reduce military and veterans' benefits."

==== Energy, the environment, and conservation ====
As governor, Kaine protected 400,000 acres (1,600 km^{2}) of Virginia land from development, fulfilling a promise he made in 2005. His conservation efforts focused on conservation easements (voluntary easements that preserve the private ownership of a piece of land while also permanently protecting it from development); a substantial Virginia land preservation tax credit encouraged easements. From 2004 to 2009, the Virginia Outdoors Foundation (a quasi-governmental entity set up in 1966 to preserve open land in the state) protected more land than it had in the previous 40 years, a fact Kaine touted as his term drew to a close.

As governor, Kaine established the Climate Change Commission, a bipartisan panel to study climate change issues. The panel was shuttered under Kaine's Republican successor, Governor Robert F. McDonnell, but revived (as the Governor's Climate Change and Resiliency Update Commission) under McDonnell's successor, Democratic Governor Terry McAuliffe.

In 2008, Kaine supported a coal-fired power plant project in Wise County, clashing with environmentalists who opposed the project.

In 2009, Kaine expressed support for tighter restrictions on mountaintop removal coal mining imposed by the Obama administration.

==== Healthcare and public health ====
In October 2006, Kaine signed an executive order banning smoking in all government buildings and state-owned cars as of January 1, 2007. He signed legislation banning smoking in restaurants and bars, with some exceptions, in March 2009, making Virginia the first Southern state to do so.

In 2007, the Republican-controlled Virginia General Assembly passed legislation, with "overwhelming bipartisan support", to require girls to receive the HPV vaccine (which immunizes recipients against a virus that causes cervical cancer) before entering high school. Kaine expressed "some qualms" about the legislation and pushed for a strong opt-out provision, ultimately signing a bill that included a provision allowing parents to opt out of the requirement without citing a reason.

In 2007, Kaine secured increases in state funding for nursing in the Virginia General Assembly and announced a 10% salary increase for nursing faculty above the normal salary increase for state employees, plus additional funds for scholarships for nursing master's programs. The initiatives were aimed at addressing a shortage of practicing nurses.

==== Virginia Tech shooting ====
After the 2007 Virginia Tech shooting, in which Seung-Hui Cho killed 32 people, Kaine appointed an eight-member Virginia Tech Review Panel, chaired by retired Virginia State Police superintendent W. Gerald Massengill, to probe the event. The commission members included specialists in psychology, law, forensics and higher education as well as former Secretary of Homeland Security Tom Ridge. The commission first met in May 2007, and issued its findings and recommendations in August 2007. Among other recommendations, the panel proposed many mental health reforms. Based on the panel's recommendations, Kaine proposed $42 million of investment in mental health programs and reforms, included "boosting access to outpatient and emergency mental health services, increasing the number of case managers and improving monitoring of community-based providers." In April 2007, Kaine signed an executive order instructing state agencies to step up efforts to block gun sales to people involuntarily committed to inpatient and outpatient mental health treatment centers. Kaine, who had been in Japan on a trade mission at the time of the shootings, received widespread praise for his quick return to the state and his handling of the issue.

==== Budget and economy ====
Among Kaine's greatest challenges as governor came during the 2008 financial crisis; The Washington Post wrote that "perhaps his greatest success was keeping the state running despite [the crisis]." Amid the Great Recession, unemployment in Virginia remained lower than the national average. During Kaine's tenure as governor, the unemployment rate in Virginia rose from 3.2% to 7.4%, a smaller increase than the national rate, which rose from 4.7% to 9.9% during the same period.

As governor, Kaine approved about $3.31 billion in general fund spending cuts, and after his term in office, the Virginia General Assembly adopted about $1.33 billion in additional budget cuts that Kaine had recommended, for a total of $4.64 billion in cuts. The Washington Post wrote, "Unable to raise taxes and required by law to balance the budget, he was forced to make unpopular cuts that led to such things as shuttered highway rest stops and higher public university tuition." Virginia was one of three states to earn the highest grade in terms of management in a report by the nonpartisan Pew Center on the States. Virginia took first place each year from 2006 to 2009 in Forbes magazine's "Best States For Business" rankings.

==== Infrastructure and transportation ====
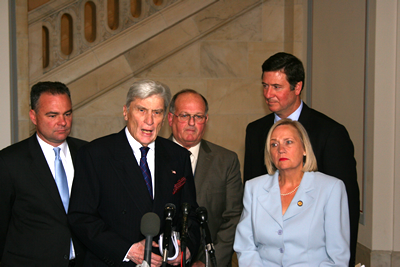
Governor Kaine with U.S. senators John Warner and George Allen

In July 2007, during the debate on the Silver Line of the Washington Metro through Tysons Corner, Kaine supported an elevated track solution rather than a tunnel, citing costs and potential delays that would put federal funding at risk.

In 2006, Kaine pressed the General Assembly to support a legislative package to ease severe traffic congestion by spending about $1 billion annually for highway construction, repairs to aging roads, mass transit, and other transportation projects. The money would be raised through increases in taxes and fees that would have raised an estimated $4 billion in revenue over four years. The Democratic-controlled Senate supported the plan, but the Republican-controlled House was unwilling to approve the taxes necessary to carry out the project, and the effort failed even after a special session of the legislature was called over the stalemate.

In 2007, Republicans in the General Assembly passed their own transportation-funding bill. Rather than a statewide tax increase to finance the transportation improvements, as Kaine and most legislative Democrats favored, the Republican bill called for transportation funding "to come from borrowing $2.5 billion and paying the debt costs out of the general fund"; authorized local tax increase in Northern Virginia; increased fees and taxes on rental cars, commercial real estate, and hotels; and increased traffic infraction fines and driver's licenses fees.

Kaine and most legislative Democrats opposed the Republican legislation, calling it inadequate to address traffic congestion and arguing that the withdrawal of funds from the general fund would affect core services such as health care, law enforcement, and education. Kaine ultimately signed a bill with amendments reflecting "concerns by local government officials and a bipartisan group of lawmakers who were concerned that the plan took too much money from the state's general fund."

==== Education ====
Under Kaine, participation in Virginia in early childhood education increased by 40.2% due to his expansion of the Virginia Preschool Initiative, which makes pre-kindergarten more accessible to four-year-olds from households close to the poverty line. Kaine sought increases to the budget for preschool programs every year during his term as governor. Virginia was rated as the best state to raise a child in a 2007 report by Education Week and the Pew Center on the States.

=== Cabinet and appointments ===
Kaine made the following appointments to his Virginia Governor's Cabinet:

- Chief of Staff: William Leighty (2006–2007), Wayne Turnage (2007–2010)
- Secretary of Administration: Viola Baskerville (2006–2010)
- Secretary of Agriculture and Forestry: Robert Bloxom (2006–2010)
- Secretary of Commerce and Trade: Patrick Gottschalk (2006–2010)
- Secretary of the Commonwealth: Katherine Hanley (2006–2010)
- Secretary of Education: Thomas R. Morris (2006–2010)
- Secretary of Finance: Jody Wagner (2006–2008), Ric Brown (2008–2010)
- Secretary of Health and Human Resources: Marilyn Tavenner (2006–2010)
- Secretary of Natural Resources: Preston Bryant (2006–2010)
- Secretary of Public Safety: John W. Marshall (2006–2010)
- Secretary of Technology: Aneesh Chopra (2006–2009), Leonard Pomata (2009–2010)
- Secretary of Transportation: Pierce Homer (2006–2010)
- Counselor to the Governor: Lawrence Roberts (2006–2009)
- Counselor to the Governor: Mark Rubin (2009–2010)
- Assistant for Commonwealth Preparedness: Robert P. Crouch (2006–2010)
- Senior Advisor for Workforce: Daniel G. LeBlanc (2006–2010)

As governor, Kaine made a number of appointments to the Virginia state courts. He made two appointments (Note: The Virginia Constitution gives the Virginia General Assembly the power to appoint state judges, but gives the governor of Virginia to power to make judicial appointments when the General Assembly is out of session. Once the General Assembly convenes, it has thirty days to confirm the appointments; if it does not, the seats become vacant. The General Assembly typically confirms the governor's choices, as it did with both of Kaine's appointments.) to the Supreme Court of Virginia, naming Chesapeake circuit judge S. Bernard Goodwyn to the Court in 2007 and Virginia Court of Appeals Judge LeRoy F. Millette Jr. in 2008. (Note: Millette was formerly a Prince William County Circuit Judge whom Kaine had previously elevated to the Court of Appeals of Virginia via an interim appointment. Nine months later, Kaine elevated Millette to the Supreme Court via an interim appointment.)

On September 27, 2007, just weeks after appointing Esam Omeish to the 20-member Virginia Commission on Immigration, Kaine learned that Omeish had made videos accusing Israel of genocide and calling for President Bush's impeachment. He immediately requested and received Omeish's resignation and said that background checks would be more thorough in the future.

== Democratic National Committee chair (2009–2011) ==
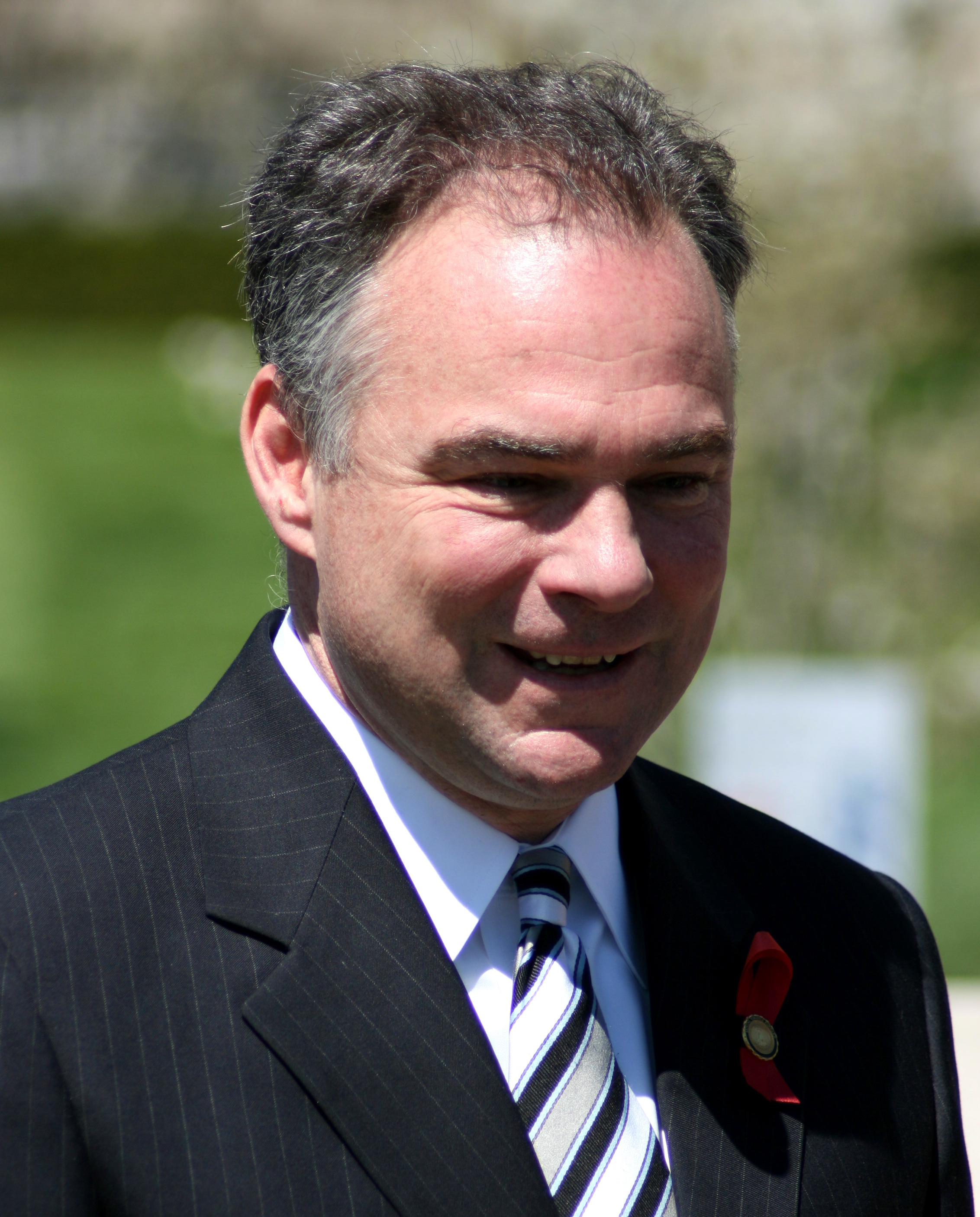
Kaine in 2008

In the 2009 Democratic National Committee chairmanship election on January 21, 2009, Kaine was elected chair of the Democratic National Committee. (Note: Introducing Kaine, President Obama refers repeatedly to the "chairman" (not "chair"), of the Democratic National Committee.) He had turned down the position the first time it was offered to him, expressing misgivings about accepting a partisan position, but took the job at Obama's request. He served as chair part-time while continuing to serve as governor of Virginia. Kaine's main goals as DNC chair "were protecting the party's seats in Congress during the 2010 midterms and integrating the president's campaign apparatus, Organizing for America, and its technological acumen into the party machinery." In the 2010 midterms, the DNC under Kaine's leadership outraised the Republican National Committee (RNC) by $30 million, but Democrats lost control of the House and lost seats in the Senate amid the Tea Party backlash. Kaine was not generally blamed for the losses.

Kaine kept a low profile in the position in comparison to his counterpart, RNC chairman Michael Steele. He focused more on fundraising and maintaining party unity than on attacking political opponents.

In February 2011, after Kaine spoke to union leaders in Madison, Organizing for America got involved in Wisconsin's budget battle and opposed Republican-sponsored anti-union legislation. It made phone calls, sent emails, and distributed messages on Facebook and Twitter to build crowds for rallies.

After completing his term as governor in January 2010, Kaine taught part-time at the University of Richmond, teaching a course in spring 2010 at the Jepson School of Leadership Studies and another in fall 2010 at the University of Richmond School of Law. He said he had chosen to teach at a private university rather than a public university "because it would not have been right for a sitting governor to be seeking employment at an institution when he writes the budget and appoints the board of the institution."

== U.S. Senate (2013–present) ==
=== Elections ===
==== 2012 ====
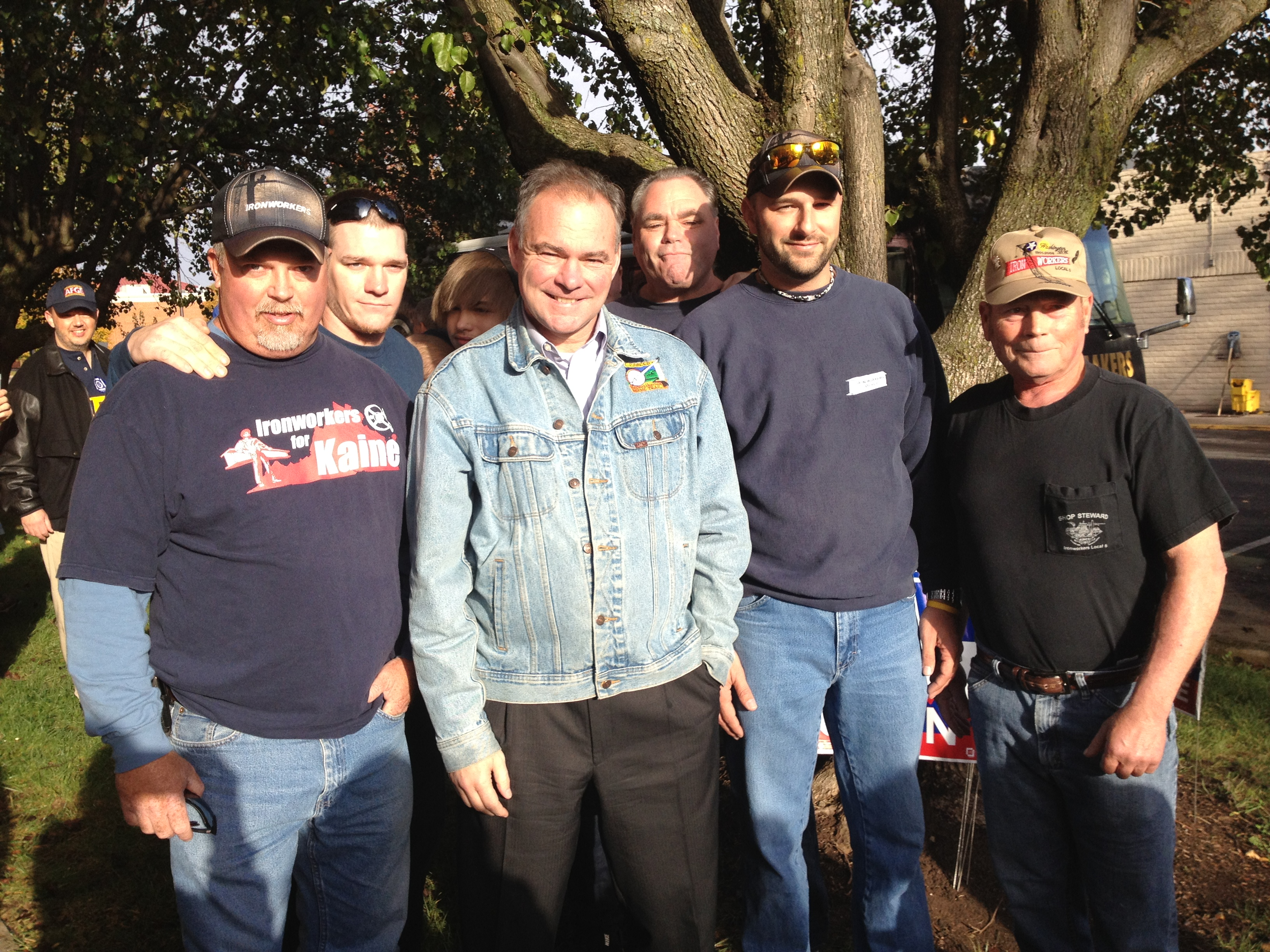
Tim Kaine and supporters, October 20, 2012

After Senator Jim Webb's decision not to seek reelection, Kaine announced on April 5, 2011, that he would run for Webb's seat. He was initially reluctant to return to public office, but Webb, Senator Mark Warner, and other Virginia Democrats saw Kaine as the strongest potential Democratic candidate and convinced him to run. Kaine named Lawrence Roberts as his campaign chairman. Mike Henry was chosen as his campaign manager. Kaine filmed announcement videos in English and Spanish and was unopposed for the Democratic nomination. He defeated former senator and governor George Allen in the general election.

==== 2018 ====
After the 2016 election, Kaine said he would run for reelection to the Senate in 2018. He expressed his desire to emulate John Warner, who represented Virginia in the Senate for 30 years. He added that he would not run for president or vice president in the future.

In his 2018 Senate campaign against Republican nominee and Trump ally Corey Stewart, Kaine had the endorsement of The Richmond Times-Dispatch, marking the first time in decades the paper had endorsed a Democrat.

After taking an early lead in his race against Stewart, Kaine worked to support other Democrats who, in seven districts, were challenging incumbent Republicans for House seats. Kaine defeated Stewart by more than 15 points.

==== 2024 ====
On January 20, 2023, Kaine announced his candidacy for reelection in 2024 at a press conference in Richmond. Members of the Democratic Party were relieved by the news, as they believed his retirement would have made the race much more competitive. Kaine defeated Republican Hung Cao in the general election.

Kaine made a surprise appearance on the November 2, 2024, episode of Saturday Night Live. Guest host John Mulaney portrayed a game show contestant who is tasked with naming people who walk on screen; he fails to give Kaine's name and is subsequently ridiculed.

=== Tenure ===
Kaine was sworn in on January 3, 2013, reuniting him with Mark Warner, the senior senator. Kaine was lieutenant governor when Warner was governor of Virginia.

On June 11, 2013, Kaine delivered a speech on the Senate floor in support of the bipartisan "Gang of Eight" immigration bill. The speech was entirely in Spanish, marking the first time a senator had ever made a speech on the Senate floor in a language other than English.

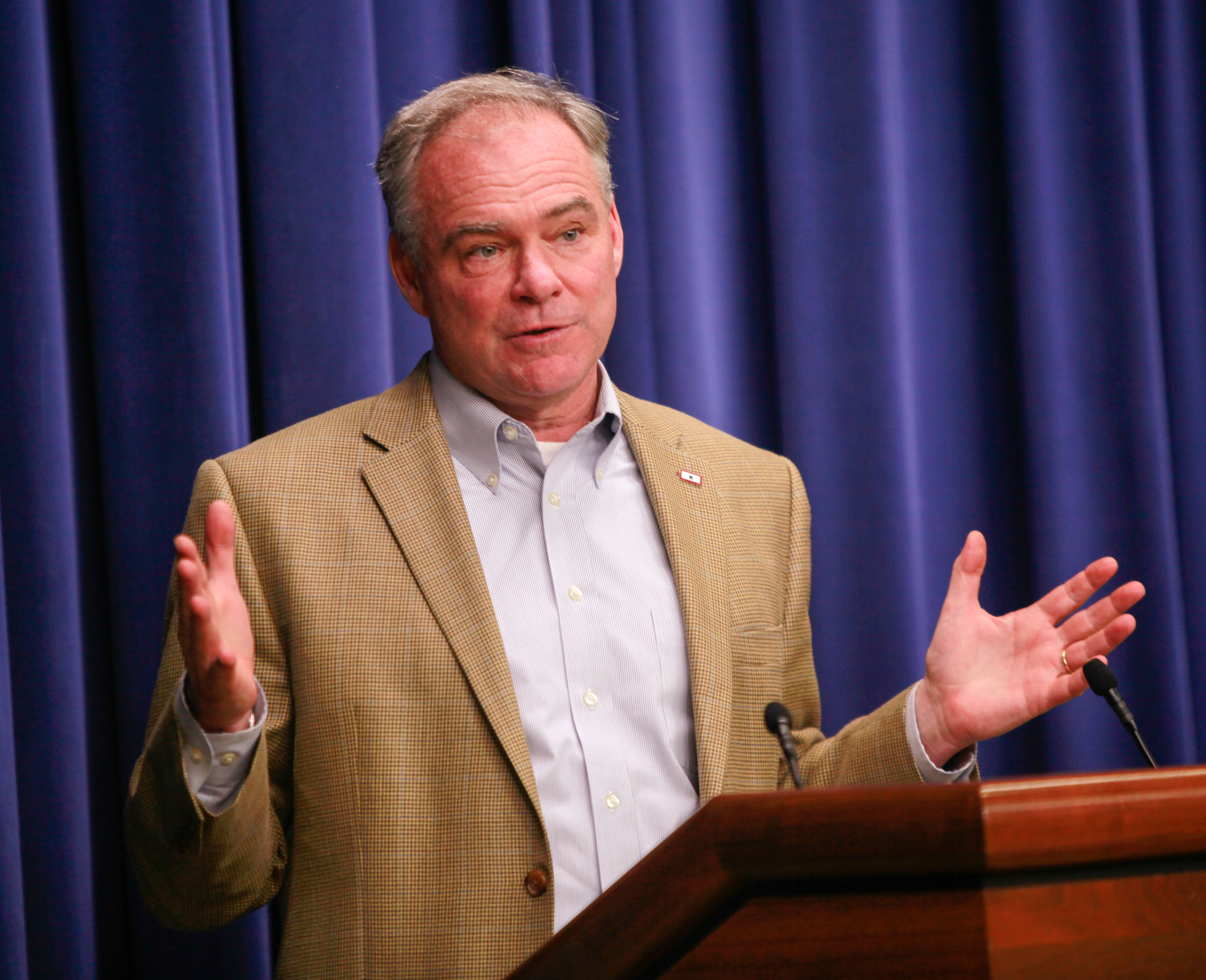
Kaine speaking in 2016

As a member of the Senate Committee on Foreign Affairs, Kaine pushed for a new congressional authorization of military force for the American operations against Islamic State of Iraq and the Levant (ISIL). Kaine supported the Joint Comprehensive Plan of Action with Iran, though he also helped Republican senator Bob Corker hold a vote on a resolution of disapproval of the deal. Kaine has taken several trips throughout the Middle East, meeting with the leaders of states such as Turkey and Israel.

While in the Senate, Kaine has continued to teach part-time at the University of Richmond, receiving a salary of $16,000 per year.

Kaine has voted with his party more than 90% of the time. According to The Washington Post, Kaine has "crafted a largely progressive record as a senator." He reportedly has good relations with both Democratic and Republican senators.

During the 2016 vice-presidential campaign, Kaine frequently criticized Donald Trump, saying that Trump "as commander-in-chief scares me to death" and had a "bizarre fascination with strongmen and authoritarian leaders". In 2017, after Trump took office, Kaine continued to criticize his "authoritarian tendencies", citing his attacks on media, judges, and peaceful protesters. At an event at George Mason University, Kaine said that with Trump in office, Americans "are in a 'living experiment' to see whether or not the Constitution still works to check executive power."

In February 2017, Kaine met with Pope Francis at a general audience at the Vatican. Kaine also met with the Jesuit Refugee Service to discuss refugees and met with Vatican officials to discuss Latin American issues. The same month, Kaine delivered an address, "The Truman Doctrine at 70", at London's Chatham House.

=== Committee assignments ===
- Committee on Armed Services
  - Subcommittee on Emerging Threats and Capabilities
  - Subcommittee on Readiness and Management Support (chair)
  - Subcommittee on Seapower
- Committee on Foreign Relations
  - Subcommittee on Africa and Global Health Policy
  - Subcommittee on State Department and USAID Management, International Operations, and Bilateral International Development
  - Subcommittee on Western Hemisphere, Transnational Crime, Civilian Security, Democracy, Human Rights, and Global Women's Issues (chair)
- Committee on Health, Education, Labor, and Pensions
  - Subcommittee on Children and Families
  - Subcommittee on Primary Health and Retirement Security
- Committee on the Budget

=== Caucuses ===
In January 2014, Kaine and Senator Rob Portman established the bipartisan Senate Career and Technical Education Caucus (CTE Caucus), which focuses on vocational education and technical education. Kaine and Portman co-chair the caucus. In 2014, Kaine and Portman introduced the CTE Excellence and Equity Act to the Senate; the legislation would provide $500 million in federal funding, distributed by competitive grants, to high schools to further CTE programs. The legislation, introduced as an amendment to the Carl D. Perkins Career and Technical Education Act of 2006, would promote apprenticeships and similar initiatives. Kaine and Portman introduced similar legislation, the Educating Tomorrow's Workforce Act, in 2017.

== Vice presidential candidacy ==
=== 2008 speculation ===
Kaine announced his support for Barack Obama's presidential bid in February 2007. It was maintained that Kaine's endorsement was the first from a statewide elected official outside of Illinois. Because Kaine was a relatively popular governor of a Southern state, there was media speculation that he was a potential nominee for vice president. Obama had supported Kaine in his campaign for governor, saying, "Tim Kaine has a message of fiscal responsibility and generosity of spirit. That kind of message can sell anywhere." On July 28, 2008, Politico reported that Kaine was "very, very high" on Obama's shortlist for vice president, a list that also included Senator Hillary Clinton of New York, Governor Kathleen Sebelius of Kansas, Senator Evan Bayh of Indiana, and Senator Joe Biden of Delaware. Obama ultimately selected Biden. It was later reported that Obama told Kaine, in breaking the news to him, "You are the pick of my heart, but Joe [Biden] is the pick of my head". Obama later wrote that he had ultimately narrowed down the choice for his running mate to Kaine and Biden. He said, "At the time, I was much closer to Tim", but Obama and his advisers David Axelrod and David Plouffe wondered whether voters would accept a ticket of "two relatively young, inexperienced, and liberal civil rights attorneys" and Obama felt the contrast between him and Biden was a strength, and that Biden's age and experience would reassure voters concerned that Obama was too young to be president.

=== 2016 campaign ===
Clinton/Kaine logo

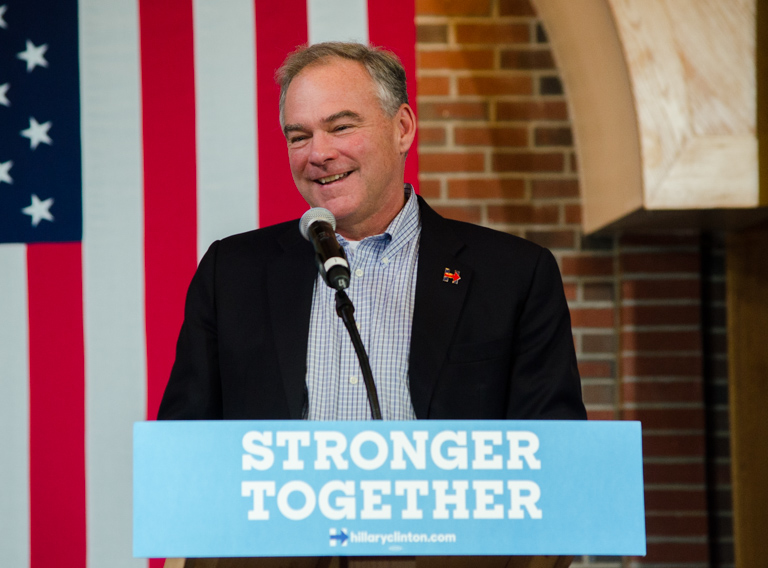
Kaine at a rally in Manchester, New Hampshire, August 2016.

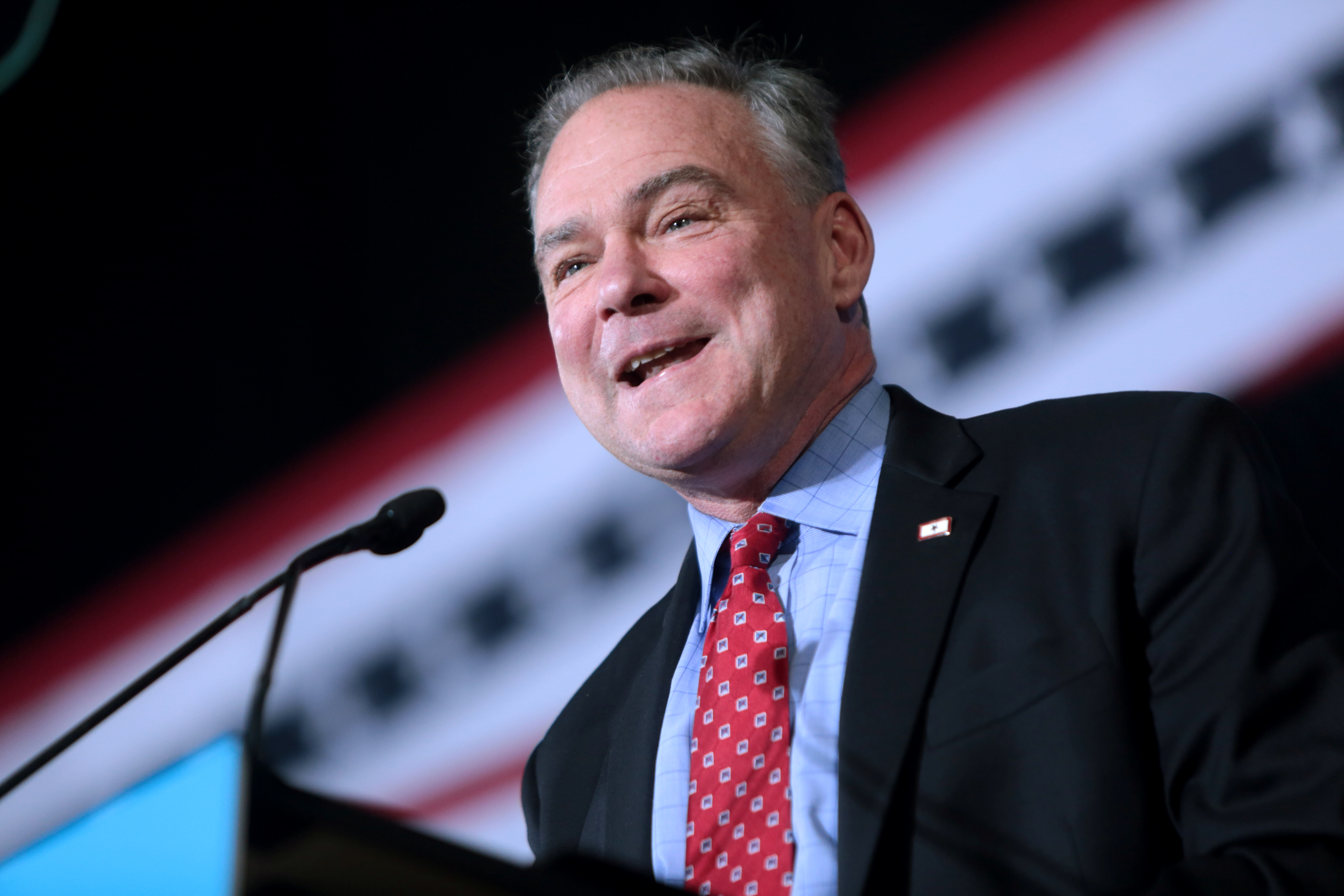
Kaine speaking at a campaign event in Phoenix, Arizona in November 2016.

Kaine endorsed Hillary Clinton for president in 2016 and campaigned actively for her in seven states during the primaries. He had been the subject of considerable speculation as a possible running mate for her, with several news reports indicating that he was at or near the top of Clinton's list of people under consideration, alongside figures such as Elizabeth Warren and Julian Castro.

The New York Times reported that Clinton's husband, former president Bill Clinton, supported Kaine as his wife's vice-presidential selection, noting his domestic and national security résumé. On July 22, 2016, she announced Kaine would be her running mate in the election. Clinton introduced Kaine as her choice in a joint appearance at a rally at Florida International University in Miami the next day. The 2016 Democratic National Convention nominated him for vice president on July 27, 2016.

Kaine was the first Virginian since Woodrow Wilson to be on a major-party ticket, and the first Virginian to run for vice president on a major-party ticket since John Tyler in 1840; he was also the first senator or former senator from Virginia to be on a major-party ticket since Tyler.

In accordance with longstanding political custom in the U.S., upon being nominated for vice president, Kaine publicly released his full tax returns for the previous ten years. He also publicly released medical records; his physician, Brian P. Monahan, the Attending Physician of the United States Congress, wrote that Kaine was "in overall excellent health." In September Kaine published a campaign book co-authored with Clinton, Stronger Together.

In Kaine's preparations for the vice-presidential debate in October 2016, lawyer Robert Barnett played the role of Republican nominee Mike Pence. (During Pence's own debate preparations, Wisconsin governor Scott Walker played Kaine.) Pence was criticized after the debate for not defending Trump's comments, while Kaine was criticized for being too aggressive and interrupting. According to ABC News, Kaine interrupted 70 times during the debate, while Pence interrupted 40 times.

Despite winning a plurality of the national popular vote, the Clinton-Kaine ticket lost the Electoral College, and thus the election, to the Trump-Pence ticket on November 8, 2016. This is the only election Kaine has ever lost. Clinton-Kaine narrowly won Virginia, the only Southern state to vote for the Democratic ticket, a victory attributed in part to Kaine.

== Political positions ==
In terms of political ideology, FiveThirtyEight gives Kaine an average score of −37 (−100 is the most liberal, and 100 is the most conservative). FiveThirtyEight characterizes him as a "mainstream Democrat" and notes that his ideology score is very similar to that of Joe Biden. Three conservative groups—the American Conservative Union, the Club for Growth, and Heritage Action—gave Kaine 0% ratings in the few years before 2016, while the liberal group Americans for Democratic Action gave Kaine a 90% rating in 2014. The New York Times wrote that "in hyperpartisan Washington, he is often seen as a centrist" while also describing him as an "old-fashioned liberal...driven by Jesuit ideals."

=== Abortion, birth control, and sex education ===
Kaine, a Roman Catholic, personally opposes abortion, but is "largely inclined to keep the law out of women's reproductive decisions." He has said, "I'm a strong supporter of Roe v. Wade and women being able to make these decisions. In government, we have enough things to worry about. We don't need to make people's reproductive decisions for them." Kaine supports some legal restrictions on abortion, such as requiring parental consent for minors (with a judicial bypass procedure) and banning late-term abortions in cases where the woman's life is not at risk.

In 2009, Kaine signed a bill to create a "Choose Life" license plate, among the more than 200 Virginia specialty plates already offered, the proceeds of which would partly go to Heartbeat International, a Christian organization that operates anti-abortion crisis pregnancy centers. Planned Parenthood and NARAL Pro-Choice America expressed disappointment in Kaine's decision. Kaine considered such license plate messages a matter of free speech and added that the move was "in keeping with the commonwealth's longtime practice of approving specialty plates with all manner of political and social messages."

Kaine previously criticized the Obama administration for "not providing a 'broad enough religious employer exemption'" in the contraceptive mandate of the Affordable Care Act, but praised a 2012 amendment to the regulations that required insurers to provide birth control to employees when an employer was an objecting religious organization.

In 2005, when running for governor, Kaine said he favored reducing abortions by "Enforcing the current Virginia restrictions on abortion and passing an enforceable ban on partial birth abortion that protects the life and health of the mother"; "Fighting teen pregnancy through abstinence-focused education"; "Ensuring women's access to health care (including legal contraception) and economic opportunity"; and "Promoting adoption as an alternative for women facing unwanted pregnancies."

In 2007, as governor, Kaine cut off state funding for abstinence-only sex education programs, citing studies that showed such programs were ineffective, while comprehensive sex education programs were more effective. Kaine believes that both abstinence and contraceptives must be taught, and that education should be evidence-based.

As a senator, Kaine has received perfect scores from Planned Parenthood and the abortion-rights advocacy group NARAL. He has received a score of zero from the anti-abortion National Right to Life Committee.

=== Campaign finance ===
Kaine "strongly disagrees" with Citizens United v. FEC (2010). In 2015, Kaine joined a group of Senate Democrats in a letter to Securities and Exchange Commission Chairwoman Mary Jo White that said the ruling "reversed long-standing precedent and has moved our country in a different and disturbing direction when it comes to corporate influence in politics." They urged the SEC to require publicly traded companies to disclose political spending to their shareholders to "increase transparency in the U.S. political process".

=== Capital punishment ===
Kaine personally opposes capital punishment, but presided over 11 executions while governor. He said, "I really struggled with [capital punishment] as governor. I have a moral position against the death penalty. But I took an oath of office to uphold it. Following an oath of office is also a moral obligation." During his time in office he commuted one death sentence in June 2008, that of Percy Levar Walton, to life imprisonment without parole on grounds of mental incompetence, writing that "one cannot reasonably conclude that Walton is fully aware of the punishment he is about to suffer and why he is to suffer it" and thus that executing him would be unconstitutional. Kaine vetoed a number of bills to expand the death sentence to more crimes, saying: "I do not believe that further expansion of the death penalty is necessary to protect human life or provide for public safety needs." Some of the vetoes were overridden. (Note: Virginia remains second only to Texas in the number of executions since capital punishment was reinstated in 1976.)

On July 31, 2019, after Attorney General William Barr announced that the United States federal government would resume the use of the death penalty for the first time in over 20 years, Kaine co-sponsored a bill banning the death penalty.

=== Environment, energy, and climate change ===
Kaine acknowledges the scientific consensus on climate change, and in a 2014 Senate speech criticized climate change deniers, as well as those who "may not deny the climate science, but ... deny that the U.S. can or should be a leader in taking any steps" to address the issue.

Kaine has expressed concern about sea level rise (a major consequence of climate change), and in particular its effect on coastal Virginia. In 2014, he partnered with two Virginia Republicans—U.S. Representatives Rob Wittman and Scott Rigell—to hold a conference on sea-level rise and "local adaptation efforts to protect military installations in the Hampton Roads area."

Kaine endorses making coal energy production cleaner, saying that it is imperative "to convert coal to electricity with less pollution than we do today." He has criticized those who "frame the debate as a conflict between an economy and the environment", saying that "protecting the environment is good for the economy." Kaine co-sponsored the Advanced Clean Coal Technology Investment in Our Nation (ACCTION) Act, legislation to increase investment in clean coal technologies. He voted against legislation to approve the Keystone XL pipeline. Kaine supports the use of hydraulic fracturing (fracking) to harvest natural gas from shale formations. He believes this will reduce carbon pollution. Kaine voted against an amendment introduced by Senator Kirsten Gillibrand that would have repealed a provision in the Energy Policy Act of 2005 that exempts fracking from the underground injection control provisions of the Safe Drinking Water Act. As a result, regulation of fracking remains in the hands of state agencies; the EPA cannot regulate it or require a federal permit. Kaine supports exporting liquefied natural gas (LNG) to other countries.

Like his fellow senator from Virginia, Mark Warner, Kaine applauded the U.S. Forest Service's plan to close most, but not all, of the George Washington National Forest to fracking and other horizontal drilling activities.

In 2013, Kaine supported oil and gas exploration off the coast of Virginia, saying, "I have long believed that the moratorium on offshore drilling, based on a cost-benefit calculation performed decades ago, should be reexamined." In April 2015, Kaine reiterated his opposition to the moratorium on offshore drilling. In March 2016, Kaine signaled that his position was softening, saying he was "particularly struck by the material objections of the Department of Defense to the incompatibility of drilling with naval operations off Virginia's coast... I have participated in this debate for over a decade as a governor and member of the Senate Armed Services Committee. The DOD has been relatively quiet during this public debate and has never shared their objections with me before." By August 2016, Kaine stated his support for a ban on offshore drilling, bringing his position in line with Hillary Clinton's and the Obama administration's.

Kaine supports the development of solar energy and offshore wind turbines. Based on his votes on environmental issues in the Senate, the League of Conservation Voters has given Kaine a 95% score for 2018, and a 94% lifetime score. (At the time of his vice-presidential campaign, Kaine had an 88% score for 2015, and a 91% lifetime score.)

In March 2019, Kaine was one of 11 senators to sponsor the Climate Security Act of 2019, legislation forming a new group within the State Department that would be responsible for developing strategies to integrate climate science and data into operations of national security as well as restoring the post of special envoy for the Arctic, which Trump had dismantled in 2017. The proposed envoy would advise the president and the administration on the potential effects of climate on national security and be responsible for facilitating all interagency communication between federal science and security agencies.

In April 2019, Kaine was one of 12 senators to sign a bipartisan letter to top senators on the Appropriations Subcommittee on Energy and Water Development advocating that the Energy Department be granted maximum funding for carbon capture, utilization and storage (CCUS), arguing that American job growth could be stimulated by investment in viable options to capture carbon emissions released into the atmosphere and expressing disagreement with the Trump's 2020 budget request to combine the two federal programs that include carbon capture research.

=== Financial regulation ===
Kaine strongly supports financial regulation and the Dodd–Frank Wall Street Reform and Consumer Protection Act. In July 2016, he signed a bipartisan letter that "urged the Consumer Financial Protection Bureau to 'carefully tailor its rulemaking' [under Dodd-Frank] regarding community banks and credit unions so as not to 'unduly burden' these institutions with regulations aimed at commercial banks." The letter prompted criticism from progressives who viewed it as anti-regulation. Democracy for America executive director Charles Chamberlain called the letter "a lobbyist-driven effort to help banks dodge consumer protection standards and regulations designed to prevent banks from destroying our economy." Kaine responded, "it's important you don't treat every financial institution the same. It wasn't credit unions that tanked the economy, it wasn't local community banks that tanked the economy, generally wasn't regional banks that did things that tanked the economy." He also signed a letter urging that a requirement that regional banks report liquidity levels on a daily basis be loosened.

=== Foreign and defense policy ===
In the Senate, Kaine has supported the normalization of U.S.–Cuban relations and the international nuclear agreement with Iran.

Kaine expressed support for Israel's right to defend itself during the 2014 Gaza War. In September 2016, in advance of a UN Security Council resolution 2334 condemning Israeli settlements in the occupied Palestinian territories, he signed an AIPAC-sponsored letter urging Obama to veto "one-sided" resolutions against Israel.

In 2015, Kaine expressed support for the Saudi-led coalition's airstrikes in Yemen against Houthi forces fighting the government of President Abdrabbuh Mansur Hadi, but in 2018, he was one of seven senators to sign a letter to Secretary of State Mike Pompeo saying that they found it "difficult to reconcile known facts with at least two" of the Trump administration's certifications that Saudi Arabia and the United Arab Emirates were attempting to protect Yemeni civilians and were in compliance with U.S. laws on arms sales, citing an inconsistency with a memo from Pompeo to Congress expressly stating that on some occasions the Saudi and Emirates governments had failed to adopt measures to reduce civilian casualties. Kaine also condemned the Trump administration for its "eagerness to give the Saudis anything they want" after the administration approved the transfer of nuclear technology to Saudi Arabia after the murder of Saudi dissident Jamal Khashoggi.

In July 2017, Kaine voted for the Countering America's Adversaries Through Sanctions Act that placed sanctions on Iran, Russia, and North Korea.

In 2019, Kaine was one of 34 Senate Democrats to sign a letter to Trump urging him to reconsider cuts to U.S. foreign aid to the Northern Triangle countries of Central America in the Fiscal Year 2018 national security appropriations bill. The letter said that Trump had "consistently expressed a flawed understanding of U.S. foreign assistance", viewing it as a gift or charity to foreign governments rather than a tool to promote American interests and collective security. The senators wrote that U.S. foreign assistance to Central American countries, by improving stability and alleviating poverty in the region, reduced Central American migration flows to the U.S.

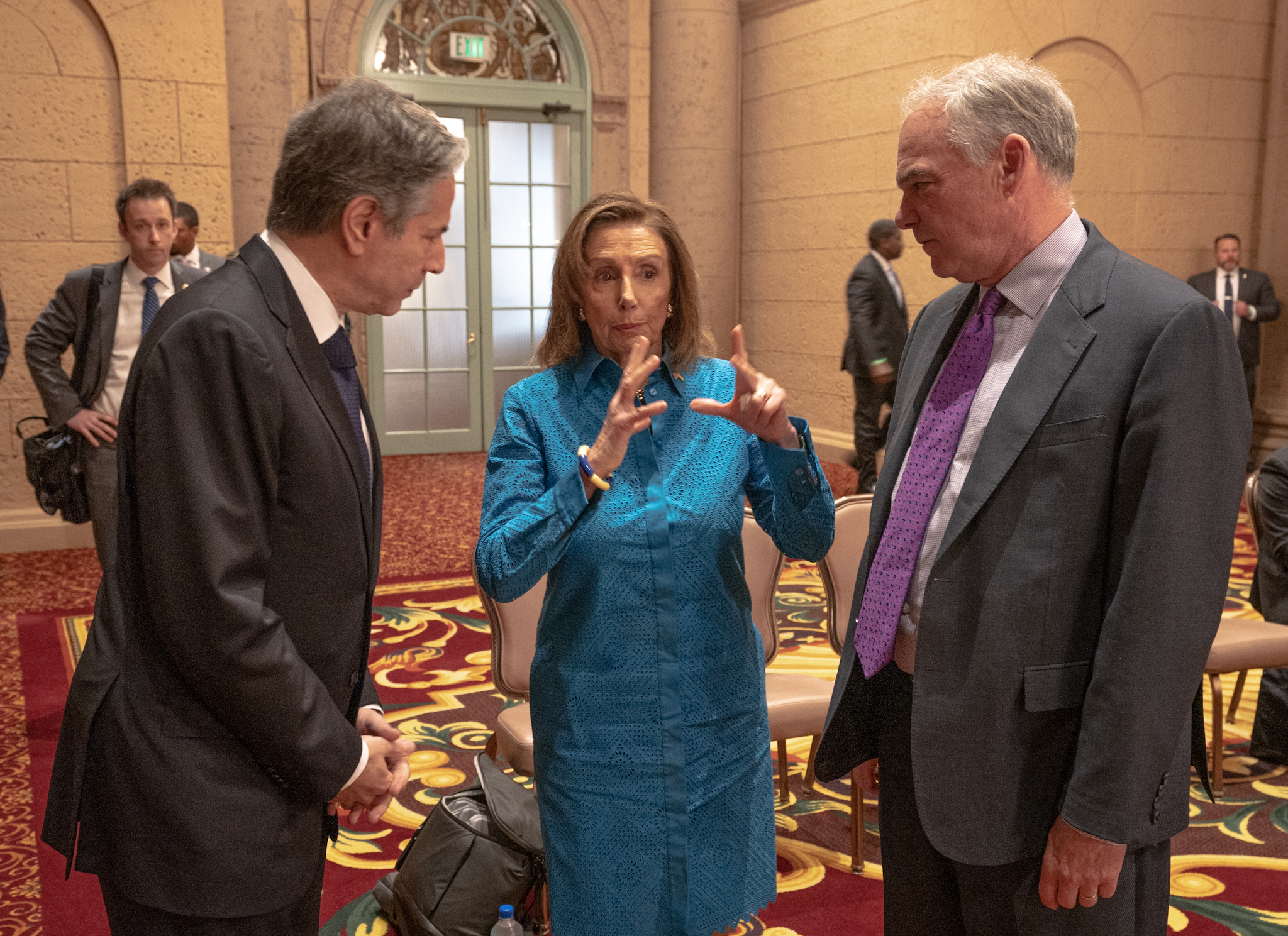
Kaine with Secretary of State Antony Blinken and Nancy Pelosi on June 10, 2022

In 2019, Kaine co-sponsored the South China Sea and East China Sea Sanctions Act, a bipartisan bill reintroduced by Marco Rubio and Ben Cardin that was intended to disrupt China's consolidation or expansion of its claims of jurisdiction over both the sea and airspace in disputed zones in the South China Sea.

In 2023, Kaine and Rubio co-sponsored a provision in the annual National Defense Authorization Act that a U.S. president cannot withdraw the U.S. from NATO without Congress's approval.

On December 30, 2023, Kaine criticized Biden's emergency sale of weapons to Israel during the Gaza war, stating, "Why should the Admin bypass Congress on arms sales to any nation? Bypassing Congress = keeping the American public in the dark." Some of Biden's closest allies in the Senate, including Kaine, were reportedly pressuring Biden to change his tactics in Gaza.

In 2024, Kaine expressed his support for an independent Palestine, saying, "Since Israel has made plain that it will not accept Palestinian autonomy, the U.S. should no longer condition recognition on Israeli assent, but instead upon Palestinian willingness to peacefully coexist with its neighbors." In November 2024, Kaine was one of 19 senators to vote to block the United States' arms sales to Israel.

==== Grand strategy and democracy promotion ====
After the 2016 presidential campaign, Kaine wrote an extensive essay in Foreign Affairs outlining his underlying foreign policy philosophy. According to Kaine, American foreign policy has suffered a lack of direction since the 1990s because the end of the Cold War rendered irrelevant America's previous grand strategy, which he identifies as the Truman Doctrine. This lack of grand strategy makes American actions seem random, complicating the policy-making process and hindering American leaders' efforts to convince the public that American foreign policy is worthwhile. To remedy this, Kaine proposed a new grand strategy based mainly on democracy promotion. His grand strategy is informed by a tri-polar balance of international power, with one pole being democratic states including the U.S. and its allies, the second autocratic powers led by Russia and China, and the third nonstate actors (multinational corporations, NGOs, gangs, etc.).

First, Kaine believes that the United States should work to support democracy in already democratic countries, as democracy globally has been declining for many years. To maintain democracy in democratic countries, Kaine proposes the creation of an intergovernmental organization consisting of all the world's democracies in which states can cooperate on solutions to problems such as corruption and voter inclusion. He compares this hypothetical group to the Organization for Economic Cooperation and Development, in which advanced industrialized countries collaborate on economic policy. Kaine believes that this new organization will help democracies remain democratic, as well as promote democracy in other countries by giving them viable democratic examples to emulate. In this way, Kaine says that the U.S. should no longer see itself as the indispensable nation, but rather the "exemplary democracy".

Second, Kaine proposes that democracies should coordinate to best interact with authoritarian states. Depending on the circumstances, democracies should either "confront", "compete", or "cooperate" with autocracies. For example, Kaine observes that the U.S. competes with its authoritarian adversaries by strengthening military and commercial alliances, and confronts them by decrying their human rights records.

Finally, Kaine believes that democracies and autocracies should cooperate when they have the same interests, such as combating climate change.

In July 2017, Kaine expanded on the grand strategy proposed in this essay in an interview at the Brookings Institution with international relations scholar Robert Kagan.

==== Afghanistan ====
Kaine's website states, "The main mission in Afghanistan—destroying Al Qaeda—is nearly complete and we should bring our troops home as quickly as we can, consistent with the need to make sure that Afghanistan poses no danger in the broader region."

==== Latin America ====
Kaine believes that American foreign policy has neglected relations with Latin America and argues for an increased focus on the Americas, saying, "We have seldom paid enough attention to the Americas, in particular, and when we have—whether through the Monroe Doctrine or by battling communist movements during the Cold War—we have focused more on blocking outsiders from building influence in the Western Hemisphere than we have on the nations already there."

==== War powers ====
Kaine is known for "expertise on the constitutional powers of the presidency" and has said that "war powers questions" are a "personal obsession" of his. He has stressed that under the Constitution, "Congress has the power to declare war—and only Congress." Kaine called the 2018 U.S. missile strikes Trump ordered against the Syrian government illegal because they were undertaken without congressional approval.

Kaine and Senator John McCain introduced the War Powers Consultation Act of 2014, which would replace the War Powers Act of 1973, bringing Congress back into decisions on the deployment of U.S. military forces. The bill would establish a Congressional Consultation Committee, with which the president would be required to consult regularly regarding significant foreign policy matters before ordering the deployment of the armed forces into a significant armed conflict and at least every two months for the duration of any significant armed conflict. Kaine argued for the bill by citing his "frustration" over the sloppiness of "process and communication over decisions of war", noting that "presidents tend to overreach and Congress sometimes willingly ducks tough votes and decisions. We all have to do better."

In February 2018, Kaine was one of 18 senators to sign a letter to Trump arguing that striking North Korea with "a preventative or preemptive U.S. military strike would lack either a constitutional basis or legal authority" without congressional approval.

In January 2020, Kaine introduced a new war powers resolution that would prohibit the U.S. from entering hostilities against Iran within 30 days unless it was responding to an imminent threat. The next month, the Iran War Powers Resolution passed the Senate 55–45, securing the votes of eight Republicans along with the Democrats. Trump vetoed the measure, and the Senate failed to override the veto.

In December 2025, Kaine sponsored S.J. Res. 98, "A joint resolution to direct the removal of United States Armed Forces from hostilities within or against Venezuela that have not been authorized by Congress". In January 2026, it advanced to a floor vote in the Senate.

==== Syria, Iraq, and ISIL ====
In 2014, Kaine argued that the U.S. military intervention against Islamic State of Iraq and the Levant (ISIL) undertaken by Obama was unconstitutional without a new congressional authorization for the use of military force against ISIL. In November 2014, at the Halifax International Security Forum, Kaine and McCain emphasized the necessity of such a congressional authorization, saying: "You just can't have a war without Congress. You can't ask people to risk their lives, risk getting killed, seeing other folks getting killed or injured if Congress isn't willing to do the job to put their thumbprint on this and say, this is a national mission and worth it." After the April 2017 Shayrat missile strike in Syria, ordered by Trump, Kaine said, "There is no legal justification for this. He should not have done this without coming to Congress." On Meet the Press, Kaine said, "I'm a strong supporter that the U.S. should take action to protect humanitarian causes, like the ban on chemical weapons. Where I differ from this administration, and I took the same position with respect to President Obama, we are a nation that's not supposed to take military action, start war, without a plan that's presented to and approved by Congress."

On December 11, 2014, after a five-month campaign by Kaine, the U.S. Senate Foreign Relations Committee approved by 10–8 (along party lines) a measure authorizing military force against ISIL but barring the use of ground troops. In October 2015, Kaine criticized Obama's approach to the Syrian Civil War, saying that the establishment of humanitarian no-fly zones would have alleviated the humanitarian crisis in Syria.

In April 2018, Kaine criticized Trump for authorizing the launch of a precision military strike on Syria without consulting Congress, calling the strike an "illegal military act". In February 2021, Kaine demanded answers from President Biden after he ordered airstrikes on Syria against Iran-backed militias without giving "legal justification" to members of Congress beforehand.

In 2023, Kaine and Todd Young co-sponsored legislation to end 1991 and 2002 congressional resolutions that authorized the use of military force. The bill repealed the Authorization for Use of Military Force (AUMF) in Iraq and passed with a bipartisan majority.

=== Firearms ===
Kaine is a firearm owner. He has supported expanded background checks for weapons purchases as well as "restrictions on the sale of combat-style weapons and high-capacity magazines." As governor, Kaine oversaw the closing of loopholes in Virginia law that allowed some who had failed background checks to purchase guns. In the Senate, he has supported legislation that would require background checks for weapons sold via gun shows and via the internet. He also supports legislation to bar weapons sales to suspected terrorists on the No Fly List.

In November 2017, Kaine was a cosponsor of the Military Domestic Violence Reporting Enhancement Act, a bill that would form a charge of domestic violence under the Uniform Code of Military Justice (UCMJ) and stipulate that convictions be reported to federal databases with the authority to keep abusers from purchasing firearms within three days in an attempt to close a loophole in the UCMJ through which convicted abusers retained the ability to purchase firearms.

In March 2018, Kaine was one of ten senators to sign a letter to Chairman of the United States Senate Committee on Health, Education, Labor and Pensions Lamar Alexander and ranking Democrat Patty Murray requesting they schedule a hearing on the causes and remedies of mass shootings in the wake of the Stoneman Douglas High School shooting.

In June 2019, Kaine was one of four senators to cosponsor the Help Empower Americans to Respond (HEAR) Act, legislation that would ban suppressors being imported, sold, made, sent elsewhere or possessed and grant a silencer buyback program as well as include certain exceptions for current and former law enforcement personnel and others. The bill was intended to respond to the Virginia Beach shooting, in which the perpetrator used a .45-caliber handgun with multiple extended magazines and a suppressor.

Kaine has a 100% rating from the Brady Campaign to Prevent Gun Violence and an "F" rating from the NRA Political Victory Fund.

=== Health care ===
Kaine supports the Patient Protection and Affordable Care Act of 2009 (Obamacare), saying in 2012, "I was a supporter and remain a supporter of the Affordable Care Act. I felt like it was a statement that we were going to put some things in the rearview mirror." In 2013, he said that he agreed that changes to the ACA should be debated, but criticized Republicans for "wrapping them up with the threat" of a federal government shutdown.

In 2018, Kaine and Senator Michael Bennet proposed the creation of "Medicare X"—a public health insurance option modeled after Medicare that would be available on ACA health insurance marketplaces along with private options. The proposal is a more incrementalist alternative to Bernie Sanders's push for "Medicare for All" (single-payer health care).

In December 2018, Kaine was one of 42 senators to sign a letter to Trump administration officials Alex Azar, Seema Verma, and Steve Mnuchin arguing that the administration was improperly using Section 1332 of the ACA to authorize states to "increase health care costs for millions of consumers while weakening protections for individuals with pre-existing conditions." The senators requested the administration withdraw the policy and "re-engage with stakeholders, states, and Congress."

In January 2019, Kaine was one of six Democratic senators to introduce the American Miners Act of 2019, a bill that would amend the Surface Mining Control and Reclamation Act of 1977 to swap funds in excess of the amounts needed to meet existing obligations under the Abandoned Mine Land fund to the 1974 Pension Plan as part of an effort to prevent its insolvency as a result of coal company bankruptcies and the 2008 financial crisis. It also increased the Black Lung Disability Trust Fund tax and ensured that miners affected by the 2018 coal company bankruptcies would not lose their health care.

In December 2016, Kaine was one of 17 senators to sign a letter to Trump asking him to fulfill a campaign pledge to bring down the cost of prescription drugs. In February 2017, he and 30 other senators signed a letter to Kaléo Pharmaceuticals in response to the opioid-overdose-reversing device Evzio rising in price from $690 in 2014 to $4,500 and requested the company provide the detailed price structure for Evzio, the number of devices Kaléo Pharmaceuticals set aside for donation, and the totality of federal reimbursements Evzio received in the previous year. In February 2019, Kaine was one of 11 senators to sign a letter to insulin manufacturers Eli Lilly and Company, Novo Nordisk, and Sanofi about increased insulin prices and charging that the price increases caused patients to lack "access to the life-saving medications they need." In 2022, Kaine voted for the Inflation Reduction Act, which would cap the price of insulin and allow Medicare to negotiate lower drug prices.

In August 2019, Kaine was one of 19 Democratic senators to sign a letter to Treasury Secretary Steve Mnuchin and Health and Human Services Secretary Alex Azar requesting data from the Trump administration on the consequences for healthcare if Texas prevailed in its lawsuit seeking to gut the Affordable Care Act. The senators wrote, "Upending the current health care system will create an enormous hole in the pocketbooks of the people we serve as well as wreck state budgets; therefore, we ask for data to help states and Congress better understand the potential consequences of the position the Administration is taking in court."

In September 2019, amid discussions to prevent a government shutdown, Kaine was one of six Democratic senators to sign a letter to congressional leadership advocating legislation that would permanently fund health care and pension benefits for retired coal miners as "families in Virginia, West Virginia, Wyoming, Alabama, Colorado, North Dakota and New Mexico" would start to receive notifications of health care termination by the end of the following month.

In November 2025, Kaine was one of eight Senate Democrats who voted to end the 2025 federal government shutdown without extending Affordable Care Act subsidies. He said: "This deal guarantees a vote to extend the Affordable Care Act premium tax credits, which Republicans weren't willing to do. Lawmakers know their constituents expect them to vote for it, and if they don't, they could very well be replaced at the ballot box by someone who will". In December 2025, 51 senators voted to extend the subsidies, fewer than the 60 needed to advance the bill. On January 1, 2026, the subsidies expired.

=== Immigration ===
Kaine supports the Deferred Action for Childhood Arrivals (DACA) and Deferred Action for Parental Accountability (DAPA) programs, which allow up to five million undocumented immigrants to gain deferral of deportation and authorization to legally work in the United States. Alongside Senator Mark Warner and many other members of Congress, he signed on to an amicus brief in support of the program in the Supreme Court case United States v. Texas.

Kaine also supports comprehensive immigration reform, which would allow persons illegally present in the U.S. to earn legal status by paying a fine and taxes.

In July 2019, following reports that the Trump administration intended to end protections of spouses, parents and children of active-duty service members from deportation, Kaine was one of 22 senators to sign a letter led by Tammy Duckworth arguing that the program allowed service members the ability "to fight for the United States overseas and not worry that their spouse, children, or parents will be deported while they are away" and that its termination would cause personal hardship for service members in combat.

In July 2019, Kaine and 15 other Senate Democrats introduced the Protecting Sensitive Locations Act, a bill to mandate that ICE agents get approval from a supervisor before undertaking an immigration raid or other enforcement actions at "sensitive locations" (schools, hospitals, places of worship, and courthouses) except in special circumstances. The bill would also require agents to receive annual training and require ICE to submit an annual report on enforcement actions in those locations.

=== LGBTQ+ rights ===
In 2006, Kaine campaigned against an amendment to the Virginia State Constitution to ban same-sex marriage, and in March 2013, he announced his support of same-sex marriage.

In the Senate, Kaine co-sponsored the Employment Non-Discrimination Act, which would bar employment discrimination on the basis of sexual orientation.

In 2005, Kaine said, "No couples in Virginia can adopt other than a married couple. That's the right policy." In 2011, he shifted his position. In 2012, he said, "there should be a license that would entitle a committed couple to the same rights as a married couple."

During the 2016 presidential campaign, Kaine noted that his position on same-sex marriage was "at odds with the current doctrine of the church that I still attend." He predicted that the Roman Catholic Church would someday adopt his view. In response, two bishops heading the doctrine and marriage committees of the U.S. Conference of Catholic Bishops said that the church's position "cannot change" and reaffirmed their opposition to same-sex marriage.

In October 2018, Kaine was one of 20 senators to sign a letter to Secretary of State Mike Pompeo urging him to reverse the State Department's policy of denying visas to same-sex partners of LGBTQ diplomats who had unions that were not recognized by their home countries, writing that the Trump administration's refusal to allow LGBTQ diplomats to bring their partners to the U.S. was tantamount to upholding the "discriminatory policies of many countries around the world." In June 2019, Kaine was one of 18 senators to sign a letter to Pompeo requesting an explanation of the State Department's decision not to issue an official statement that year commemorating Pride Month or issue the annual cable outlining activities for embassies commemorating Pride Month. The signatories to the letter also asked why the LGBTI special envoy position had remained vacant. The authors said that the State Department's moves had sent "signals to the international community that the United States is abandoning the advancement of LGBTI rights as a foreign policy priority."

In 2022, Kaine voted for the Respect for Marriage Act.

=== Taxes ===
Kaine supports allowing the Bush tax cuts to expire for those with incomes above $500,000.

In 2012, Kaine supported raising the cap on income subject for the FICA (Social Security) payroll tax "so that it covers a similar percentage of income as it did in the 1980s under President Reagan, which would greatly extend the solvency of the (Social Security) program."

In the Senate, Kaine has supported the Marketplace Fairness Act, which would allow states to require online retailers to collect sales taxes in the same manner as traditional brick-and-mortar retailers.

=== Trade ===
Kaine supported granting Obama Trade Promotion Authority (TPA or "fast track") to allow him to negotiate free trade agreements. He said the goal should be to "negotiate deals that protect workers' rights, environmental standards and intellectual property, while knocking down tariffs and other barriers that some countries erect to keep American products out."

In July 2016, Kaine said the Trans-Pacific Partnership (TPP) agreement was "an improvement of the status quo" and an "upgrade of labor standards... environmental standards... intellectual property protections", but maintained that he had not yet decided how to vote on final approval of the agreement, citing "significant concerns" over TPP's dispute resolution mechanism. Later that July, Kaine said that he could not support the TPP in its current form.

Kaine has been a proponent of NAFTA.

In 2025, Kaine introduced several resolutions to end the national emergencies Trump had declared to justify sweeping global tariffs. Kaine and Mark Warner introduced a resolution to end Trump's national emergency on energy, but it was defeated by the Senate's Republican majority. A resolution to end the emergency justifying American tariffs on Canada narrowly passed the Senate, but was blocked by the House.

=== Transportation, growth, and housing ===
Kaine supports some smart growth-style policies (which he calls "a balanced approach to growth") to control sprawl and improve transportation. He favors a transportation policy that includes public transit, bicycles, and pedestrians. As governor, Kaine pushed through a $100 million open-space acquisition initiative. Under Kaine, Amtrak service in Virginia was expanded. He also participated in a White House round-table discussion on high-speed rail in 2009.

In April 2019, Kaine was one of 41 senators to sign a bipartisan letter in support of U.S. Department of Housing and Urban Development's Section 4 Capacity Building program, a program authorizing HUD to partner with nonprofit community development groups to provide support to community development corporations. The letter said that the longstanding program had successfully promoted economic and community development, opposed the proposed elimination of the plan in Trump's budget proposal for Fiscal Year 2020, and urged the Senate to support continued funding for Section 4 in Fiscal Year 2020.

=== Workers' rights and gender equality ===
Kaine is "generally pro-union" and has received a 96% lifetime Senate voting rating from the AFL–CIO, which praised his selection as Clinton's running mate. But Kaine supports Virginia's longstanding "right-to-work" law, which "frees union nonmembers from any legal obligation to pay fees to a union that bargains collectively on their behalf".

Kaine supports the Lilly Ledbetter Fair Pay Act, which expands the cases in which worker can sue against gender pay discrimination. After Clinton selected him as her running mate in 2016, Kaine was praised by the National Organization for Women.

Kaine favors an increase in the minimum wage.

=== 2026 Iran war ===
Kaine harshly criticized Trump's military action against Iran. He contended that the Trump administration initiated the attack without notifying Congress, despite the Senate's intention to vote to restrict the president's war powers, to initiate an "illegal war" before the vote. Emphasizing that the War Powers Act was applicable even after hostilities had commenced, Kaine urged lawmakers to return immediately to address the matter, noting that Congress had not received any notification.

== Personal life ==
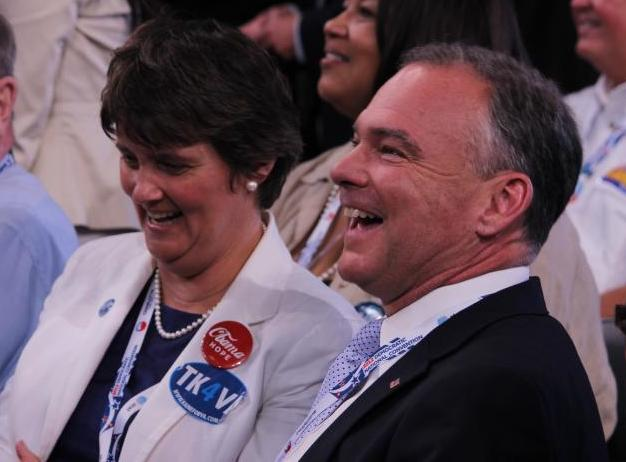
Kaine with his wife Anne at the 2012 Democratic National Convention

In November 1984, Kaine married Anne Bright Holton, the daughter of A. Linwood Holton Jr., the 61st governor of Virginia. The couple met while they were students at Harvard Law School. Holton has been a judge for the Virginia Juvenile and Domestic Relations District Court in Richmond. After serving as first lady of Virginia during her husband's term, she was appointed by Governor Terry McAuliffe in 2014 to be Virginia's secretary of education, and held that position until July 2016, when she stepped down after her husband was nominated for vice president. The couple has three children, one of whom is a U.S. Marine. As of 2016, Kaine and his wife had been congregants of St. Elizabeth Catholic Church in Richmond, a mostly black congregation, for 30 years.

Kaine plays the harmonica and often travels with several.

Kaine is fluent in Spanish as a result of his nine months in Honduras. During the 2016 campaign, he became the first member of a presidential ticket to deliver a speech in Spanish.

On May 28, 2020, Kaine announced that he and his wife had tested positive for COVID-19 antibodies. In March 2022, it was reported that he has long COVID symptoms.

On April 9, 2024, Kaine's book, Walk Ride Paddle: A Life Outside was published. In it, he chronicles hiking the 559 miles of the Appalachian Trail in Virginia, biking the 321-mile length of the Blue Ridge Parkway and kayaking the James River from the Allegheny Mountains to the Chesapeake Bay. He began these years-long treks in 2019 and did them during weekends and Senate recesses.

=== Personality and leadership style ===
About 145,000 emails from Kaine and his staff during his term as governor are publicly accessible at the Library of Virginia. Politico conducted an analysis of the correspondence and wrote that the messages show Kaine to be a "media-savvy" and detail-oriented "micro-manager" who is also a policy "wonk".

According to The New York Times, Kaine "is widely described by people in his political orbit as a likable if less than charismatic figure...guided by moral convictions that flow from his deep Christian faith." On Meet the Press, Kaine called himself "boring."

== Awards and honors ==
Kaine has received the Humanitarian Award from the Virginia Center for Inclusive Communities, then the Virginia Region of the National Conference for Community and Justice (2000), the Virginia Council of Churches' Faith in Action Award (2009), the University of Richmond School of Law's William Green Award for Professional Excellence (2012), the Award for Public Service in the Americas from the Inter-American Dialogue (2014), the Appalachian Trail Conservancy's Congressional Award (2015), and the Center for the National Interest's Distinguished Service Award (2016). He was made a Knight Grand Cross of the Order of Isabella the Catholic in 2017. He received the Shipbuilders Council of America (SCA) Maritime Leadership Award in 2024.

== Electoral history ==
2001 lieutenant gubernatorial election

Virginia Lieutenant gubernatorial Democratic primary, 2001
Party	Candidate	Votes	%
Democratic	Tim Kaine	64,008	39.66
Democratic	Alan Diamonstein	50,753	31.45
Democratic	J. C. Jones	46,640	28.90
Majority		13,255	8.21
Total votes		161,401	

Virginia Lieutenant gubernatorial election, 2001
Party	Candidate	Votes	%	±%
Democratic	Tim Kaine	925,974	50.35	+5.30%
Republican	Jay K. Katzen	883,886	48.06	−2.10%
Libertarian	G. A. Reams	28,783	1.57	N/A
Write-in	Others	490	0.03	N/A
Majority		42,088	2.29	−2.29%
Total votes		1,839,133		
Swing to Democratic from Republican		Swing	5.30	

2005 gubernatorial election

Virginia gubernatorial election, 2005
Party	Candidate	Votes	%	±%
Democratic	Tim Kaine	1,025,942	51.72%	−0.44%
Republican	Jerry Kilgore	912,327	45.99%	−1.04%
Independent	Russ Potts	43,953	2.22%	
None	Write-Ins	1,556	0.08%	
Majority		113,615	5.73%	+0.60%
Turnout		1,983,778	44.96%	−1.4%
Democratic hold		Swing		

2012 U.S. Senate election

United States Senate election in Virginia, 2012
Party	Candidate	Votes	%	±%
Democratic	Tim Kaine	2,010,067	52.83%	+3.24%
Republican	George Allen	1,785,542	46.92%	−2.28%
Write-in		9,410	0.25%	+0.15%
Total votes		3,805,019	100.0%	N/A
Democratic hold				

2016 vice presidential election

United States vice presidential election, 2016
Party	Candidate	Votes	%
Republican	Mike Pence	62,984,828 (popular votes); 305 electors (30 states + ME−02)	46.1% (popular vote); 56.7% (electoral vote)
Democratic	Tim Kaine	65,853,514 (popular votes); 227 electors (20 states + DC)	48.2% (popular vote); 42.2% (electoral vote)

2018 U.S. Senate election

United States Senate election in Virginia, 2018
Party	Candidate	Votes	%	±%
Democratic	Tim Kaine (incumbent)	1,910,370	57.00%	+4.17%
Republican	Corey Stewart	1,374,313	41.01%	−5.91%
Libertarian	Matt Waters	61,565	1.84%	+1.84%
Write-in		5,125	0.15%	-0.10%
Total votes		3,351,373	100.0%	N/A
Democratic hold				

2024 U.S. Senate election

United States Senate election in Virginia, 2024
Party	Candidate	Votes	%	±%
Democratic	Tim Kaine (incumbent)	2,417,115	54.37%	−2.63%
Republican	Hung Cao	2,019,911	45.44%	+4.43%
Write-in		8,509	0.19%	+0.04%
Total votes		4,445,535	100.0%	N/A
Democratic hold				

== Notes ==
Political offices
Preceded by Larry Chavis	Mayor of Richmond; 1998–2001	Succeeded by Rudy McCollum
Preceded by John H. Hager	Lieutenant Governor of Virginia; 2002–2006	Succeeded by Bill Bolling
Preceded by Mark Warner	Governor of Virginia; 2006–2010	Succeeded by Bob McDonnell
Party political offices
Preceded by Lewis Payne	Democratic nominee for Lieutenant Governor of Virginia; 2001	Succeeded by Leslie Byrne
Preceded by Mark Warner	Democratic nominee for Governor of Virginia; 2005	Succeeded by Creigh Deeds
Preceded by Nancy Pelosi; Harry Reid	Response to the State of the Union address 2006	Succeeded by Jim Webb
Preceded by Howard Dean	Chair of the Democratic National Committee; 2009–2011	Succeeded by Donna Brazile; Acting
Preceded by Jim Webb	Democratic nominee for U.S. Senator from Virginia (Class 1); 2012, 2018, 2024	Most recent
Preceded by Joe Biden	Democratic nominee for Vice President of the United States; 2016	Succeeded by Kamala Harris
U.S. Senate
Preceded by Jim Webb	United States Senator (Class 1) from Virginia; 2013–present Served alongside: Mark Warner	Incumbent
U.S. order of precedence (ceremonial)
Preceded by Tim Scott	Order of precedence of the United States as United States Senator	Succeeded by Angus King
Preceded by Angus King	United States senators by seniority 40th	Succeeded by Ted Cruz
