= Glenn Oder =

American politician (born 1957)

Member of the Virginia House of Delegates from the 94th district
- In office January 9, 2002 – August 31, 2011
- Preceded by: Alan Diamonstein
- Succeeded by: David Yancey

Personal details
- Born: George Glenn Oder; April 24, 1957 (age 69) Newport News, Virginia, U.S.
- Party: Republican
- Spouse: Mary Catherine Bowen
- Children: Amanda, Kristen, Kathryn
- Education: Virginia Tech (B.Arch.)
- Profession: Landscape architect

George Glenn Oder (born April 24, 1957) is an American politician. From 2002–2012 he served in the Virginia House of Delegates, representing the 94th district in the city of Newport News. He is a member of the Republican Party.
