= Alan Diamonstein =

American attorney and politician (1931–2019)

Member of the Virginia House of Delegates
- In office January 10, 1968 – January 9, 2002
- Preceded by: Charles K. Hutchens
- Succeeded by: Glenn Oder
- Constituency: 40th district (1968‍–‍1972); 49th district (1972‍–‍1982); 48th district (1982‍–‍1983); 94th district (1983‍–‍2002)

Chair of the Democratic Party of Virginia
- In office March 9, 1982 – June 14, 1985
- Preceded by: Owen B. Pickett
- Succeeded by: Dick Davis

Personal details
- Born: Alan Arnold Diamonstein; August 20, 1931 Newport News, Virginia, U.S.
- Died: October 17, 2019 (aged 88) Newport News, Virginia, U.S.
- Party: Democratic
- Spouses: Barbaralee Dworkin (m. 1956; div. 1972) Beverly Hicks (m. 1972)
- Education: University of Virginia (BS, LLB)

Military service
- Branch/service: United States Air Force
- Battles/wars: Korean War

Alan Arnold Diamonstein (August 20, 1931 – October 17, 2019) was an American attorney and Democratic Party politician.

Diamonstein served in the Virginia House of Delegates from 1968 to 2002, representing parts of Newport News. Diamonstein chose not to run for reelection in 2001, seeking instead the Democratic nomination for lieutenant governor. He came in second to Richmond mayor Tim Kaine, who would go on to win in the general election. Diamonstein was the chair of the Democratic Party of Virginia from 1982 to 1985.
