= 2001 Virginia Attorney General election =

State election of Attorney General

- November 6, 2001
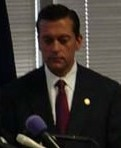

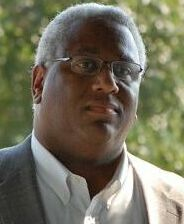
Nominee	Jerry Kilgore	Donald McEachin
Party	Republican	Democratic
Popular vote	1,107,068	736,431
Percentage	60.01%	39.92%
- Kilgore: 50–60% 60–70% 70–80% 80–90% McEachin: 50–60% 60–70% 70–80%
Attorney General before election
Randolph A. Beales
Republican
Elected Attorney General
Jerry Kilgore
Republican

The 2001 Virginia Attorney General election was held on November 6, 2001, to elect the next attorney general of Virginia. The Republican nominee, Jerry Kilgore, defeated the Democratic nominee, Donald McEachin, by around 20 points.

== General election ==
=== Candidates ===
- Jerry Kilgore (R)
- Donald McEachin (D)

=== Results ===
2001 Virginia Attorney General election
Party	Candidate	Votes	%
Republican	Jerry Kilgore	1,107,068	60.01
Democratic	Donald McEachin	736,431	39.92
Write-in		1,282	0.07%
Total votes		1,844,781	100.0
Republican hold			

== See also ==
- 2001 Virginia gubernatorial election
- 2001 Virginia lieutenant gubernatorial election
- 2001 Virginia House of Delegates election
- 2001 Virginia elections
- 2001 United States elections
