= 2001 Virginia House of Delegates election =

2001 Virginia House of Delegates elections
- November 6, 2001

All 100 seats in the Virginia House of Delegates 51 seats needed for a majority
- Turnout: 46.4% ▲
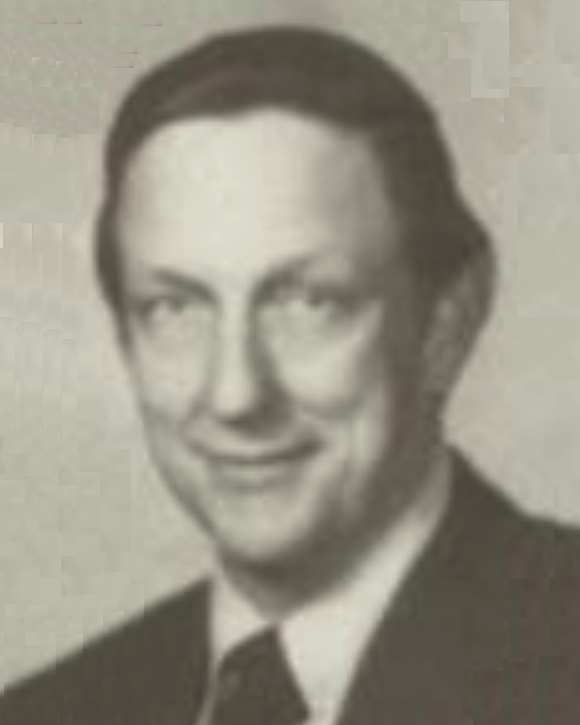

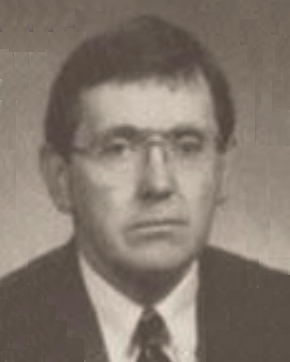
	Majority party	Minority party
Leader	Vance Wilkins	Richard Cranwell
Party	Republican	Democratic
Leader since	November 19, 1991	January 12, 2000
Leader's seat	24th	14th
Last election	52	47
Seats won	64	34
Seat change	▲12	▼13
Popular vote	933,120	657,292
Percentage	55.5%	39.1%
Swing	▲5.0%	▼4.8%
- Results: Republican hold Republican gain Democratic hold Democratic gain Independent hold Independent gain
Speaker before election
Vance Wilkins
Republican
Elected Speaker
Vance Wilkins
Republican

The Virginia House of Delegates election of 2001 was held on Tuesday, November 6.

== Results ==
=== Overview ===
↓
64	34	2
Republican	Democratic

Parties		Candidates	Seats				Popular Vote		
Parties		Candidates	1999	2001	+/-	Strength	Vote	%	Change
	Republican	81	52	64	▲12	64.00%	933,120	55.47%	
	Democratic	69	47	34	▼13	34.00%	657,292	39.08%	
	Independent	15	1	2	Steady	2.00%	78,464	4.66%	
	Libertarian	5	0	0	Steady	0.00%	4,741	0.28%	
	Independent Greens	1	0	0	Steady	0.00%	385	0.02%	
-	Write-ins		0	0	Steady	0.00%	8,114	0.48%	
Total		171	100	100	0	100.00%	1,682,116	100.00%	-

== See also ==
- 2001 United States elections
- 2001 Virginia elections
  - 2001 Virginia gubernatorial election
  - 2001 Virginia lieutenant gubernatorial election
  - 2001 Virginia Attorney General election
