= David Yancey =

American politician (born 1972)

Member of the Virginia House of Delegates from the 94th district
- In office January 11, 2012 – January 8, 2020
- Preceded by: Glenn Oder
- Succeeded by: Shelly Simonds

Personal details
- Born: David Etienne Yancey; April 6, 1972 (age 54) Newport News, Virginia, U.S.
- Party: Republican
- Education: University of Georgia (BA)
- Occupation: Businessperson
- Website: davidyanceyfordelegate.com

David Etienne Yancey (born April 6, 1972) is an American politician. A Republican, he was elected to the Virginia House of Delegates in 2011. He represented the 94th district.

== Early life, education, business career ==
Yancey was born in Newport News, Virginia. He graduated from Peninsula Catholic High School in 1990, and received a B.A. degree in political science and history from the University of Georgia in 1995.

In 2003 Yancey started a real estate development and property management firm, and in 2009 he went into commercial fishing.

== Political career ==
On August 9, 2011, the 94th district incumbent and Republican nominee, Glenn Oder, announced his resignation from the House of Delegates to become the executive director of the Fort Monroe Authority, overseeing the disposal of the Fort Monroe military reservation after the United States Army's closing of the base. Two days later, Yancey was chosen to replace him on the November ballot. Yancey then defeated Democratic lawyer Gary R. West. Yancey was reelected in 2013, defeating Democrat Robert Farinholt, 51-49%. He was reelected again in 2015, defeating Democrat Shelly Simonds, 57%-42%.

=== 2017 election and tie ===
In the 2017 general election, David Yancey faced off against challenger Shelly Simonds, and the election resulted in a tie. Unofficial election night results showed Yancey with a 12-vote lead. Simonds requested a recount, to which she was entitled under state law, which provides for recounts when less than 1% of the vote separates two candidates. The race was significant because the Republicans' 51–49 majority in the House of Delegates depended on Yancey's win. After provisional ballots were counted, Yancey's lead decreased to 10 votes. Simonds and the Democratic Party of Virginia filed an emergency motion with a circuit court to receive the names of all rejected absentee ballots; after receiving the names, they got another court order for a single ballot to be unsealed, and it was found that the ballot had not been signed properly and remained rejected. On November 20, the Virginia State Board of Elections certified Yancey as the winner by 10 votes.

On December 19, 2017 the recount was completed and gave Simonds the victory by one vote.

The next day, the Yancey campaign asked a court to examine a ballot that had been discounted. The ballot showed both bubbles for Yancey and Simonds filled in, but with a slash through Simonds's name. The voter had voted for all other Republican candidates on the ballot. The three-judge panel determined the voter's intent was to vote for Yancey and awarded him the vote, resulting in a tie. Under Virginia state law, the winner is decided randomly by lot, though the loser can subsequently ask for another recount.

On January 4, 2018, the Virginia Election Board certified that Yancey was the winner after a drawing by lot. Yancey was named the winner only after his name was randomly drawn out of a ceramic bowl. Simonds declined to request another recount, stating that "she did not expect to prevail in a dispute that captured national attention".

In May 2018, it was revealed that an error by local election officials caused 26 voters to cast ballots in the 93rd district when they should have been cast in the district that Yancey won. Records indicate that 17 of the 26 voters were likely to vote Democratic because they had previously voted in Democratic primaries while only one voter had voted in a Republican primary. Since the 2017 election was decided by such narrow margins, the 26 misaligned votes may have cost Democrats the seat and thus majority control in the Virginia House.

=== 2019 election ===
After the 2017 election, the 94th district underwent heavy redistricting. Yancey was defeated by his 2017 opponent, Democrat Shelly Simonds, who received 57.7% of the vote.

== See also ==
- List of close election results
