= Shelly Simonds =

American teacher and politician

Shelly A. Simonds
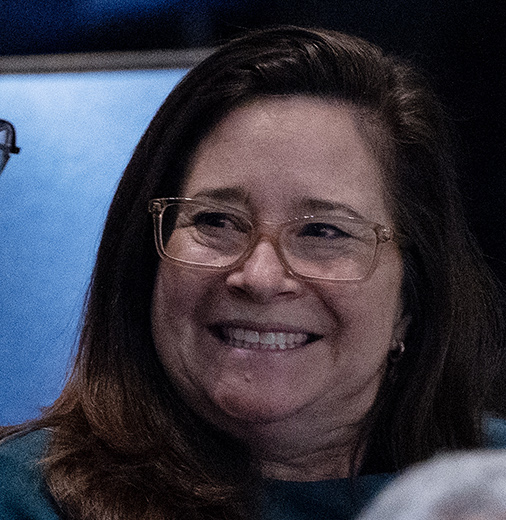

Member of the Virginia House of Delegates
- Incumbent
- Assumed office January 8, 2020
- Preceded by: David Yancey
- Constituency: 94th district (2020–2024); 70th district (2024–present)

Personal details
- Born: November 9, 1967 (age 58)
- Party: Democratic
- Education: Bucknell University (B.A.); Stanford University (M.A.)
- Profession: Teacher
- Website: simondsfordelegate.com

Shelly Anne Simonds (born November 9, 1967) is an American educator and politician serving in the Virginia House of Delegates, representing the 70th district. She was first elected in 2019. During the 2013 and 2017 elections, Simonds was Democratic candidate for Virginia's 94th House of Delegates district in Newport News, Virginia.

== 2023 election ==
In 2023, Simonds once again ran for re-election. She retained her seat with 57% of the vote.

== 2019 election ==
In 2019, Simonds ran for a third time against Delegate Yancey, however this time in a redrawn district. Simonds won the November 2019 election to become Virginia's 94th district House of Delegates representative with 57.7% of the votes cast, against multiple opponents.

== 2017 election ==
After a close election November 7, 2017, Simonds was 10 votes behind her opponent. A recount was held in December and Simonds was declared winner by 1 vote. The next day, a 3-judge panel declared that a previously uncounted ballot in which both candidates' bubbles had been filled, but which Simonds' bubble was crossed out should have been counted for the Republican David Yancey—leaving the election a tie.

On December 27, 2017, Simonds filed a motion asking judges to reconsider count of the double-marked ballot. On January 3, 2018, the recount panel rejected the motion. Drawing by lot was scheduled for the following day. On January 4, 2018, the Virginia Election Board certified that Yancey was the winner after a drawing by lot. Simonds declined to request another recount, to which she was entitled for losing the drawing, stating that "she did not expect to prevail in a dispute that captured national attention".
