= 2001 Virginia gubernatorial election =

- November 6, 2001
- Turnout: 46.4% ▼3.1
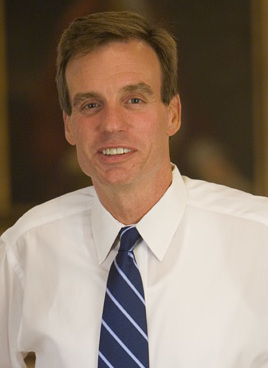

Nominee	Mark Warner	Mark Earley
Party	Democratic	Republican
Popular vote	984,177	887,234
Percentage	52.16%	47.03%
- Warner: 40–50% 50–60% 60–70% 70–80% 80–90% Earley: 40–50% 50–60% 60–70%
Governor before election
Jim Gilmore
Republican
Elected Governor
Mark Warner
Democratic

The 2001 Virginia gubernatorial election was held on November 6, 2001, to elect the next governor of Virginia. Republican incumbent Jim Gilmore was ineligible to run for re-election, as the Constitution of Virginia prohibits its governors from serving consecutive terms. Democratic nominee Mark Warner defeated Republican attorney general Mark Earley by nearly 100,000 votes or 5.13 percent of the vote.

As of 2026, this is the most recent gubernatorial election in which the Democratic candidate won the majority of counties and independent cities.

== General election ==
=== Candidates ===
- Mark Earley, Virginia attorney general (Republican)
- William Redpath (Libertarian)
- Mark Warner, telecommunications executive, venture capitalist, and former chair of the Democratic Party of Virginia (Democratic)

=== Campaign ===
Warner made a conscious effort to appeal to voters in rural Virginia, personified by his official campaign song, written by the Bluegrass Brothers. The song was considered an essential part of Warner's outreach to rural Virginia, with the lyrics emphasizing Warner's understanding of the culture of that part of the state.

=== Polling ===
Poll source	Date(s) administered	Sample size (Note: Key: A – all adults RV – registered voters LV – likely voters V – unclear)	Margin of error	Mark Earley (R)	Mark Warner (D)	Other	Undecided
Mason-Dixon Polling & Strategy/Research Inc.	November 1, 2001 (Note: No official poll shows at what time period it was specifically conducted.)	625 (LV)	± 4.0%	42%	48%	1% (Note: William Redpath with 1%)	9%
Roanoke College	October 21–30, 2001	423 (LV)	± 4.8%	36%	45%	1%	18%
Mason-Dixon Polling & Strategy/Research Inc.	October 18, 2001 (Note: No official poll shows at what time period it was specifically conducted.)	625 (LV)	± 4.0%	42%	45%	1% (Note: William Redpath with 1%)	12%
McLaughlin & Associates (R)	September 27, 2001 (Note: No official poll shows at what time period it was specifically conducted.)	–	–	38%	47%	–	–
Mason-Dixon Polling & Strategy	September 10–15, 2001	625 (LV)	± 4.0%	40%	46%	1% (Note: William Redpath with 1%)	13%
The Washington Post	August 21, 2001	1,312 (RV)	± 3.0%	37%	51%	–	12%
The Washington Post	August 21, 2001 (Note: Warner lead by 11 percentage points in this subsection.)	695 (LV)	± 4.0%	–	–	–	–

=== Results ===
Virginia gubernatorial election, 2001
Party	Candidate	Votes	%	±%
Democratic	Mark Warner	984,177	52.16%	+9.60%
Republican	Mark Earley	887,234	47.03%	−8.79%
Libertarian	William Redpath	14,497	0.77%	+0.77%
Write-in		813	0.04%	
Majority		96,943	5.14%	−8.11%
Turnout		1,886,721		
Democratic gain from Republican		Swing		

==== Results by county and city ====
County	Warner	Votes	Earley	Votes	Redpath	Votes	Others	Votes
Accomack	50.3%	3,710	48.5%	3,575	1.2%	89	0.0%	0
Albemarle	56.3%	14,891	42.2%	11,143	1.4%	373	0.1%	21
Alexandria	68.2%	23,739	31.1%	10,810	0.6%	226	0.1%	27
Alleghany	59.0%	3,018	39.9%	2,044	1.1%	56	0.0%	0
Amelia	46.7%	1,665	52.7%	1,880	0.6%	20	0.0%	0
Amherst	50.8%	4,198	48.8%	4,031	0.4%	37	0.0%	0
Appomattox	51.3%	2,268	47.3%	2,090	1.4%	61	0.0%	1
Arlington	68.3%	35,990	30.8%	16,214	0.9%	487	0.1%	28
Augusta	37.1%	6,673	61.9%	11,133	0.9%	164	0.0%	4
Bath	51.8%	804	46.4%	721	1.8%	28	0.0%	0
Bedford County	41.1%	8,035	57.8%	11,298	1.1%	211	0.0%	3
Bedford	56.9%	1,031	41.2%	747	1.9%	35	0.0%	0
Bland	48.2%	835	51.2%	888	0.6%	11	0.0%	0
Botetourt	43.7%	4,629	55.4%	5,872	0.9%	100	0.0%	1
Bristol	48.6%	2,166	50.9%	2,268	0.5%	21	0.1%	3
Brunswick	65.3%	2,840	34.3%	1,491	0.4%	16	0.1%	3
Buchanan	65.7%	3,746	33.7%	1,921	0.7%	39	0.0%	0
Buckingham	59.1%	2,364	40.1%	1,601	0.8%	32	0.0%	0
Buena Vista	58.6%	853	39.3%	572	2.1%	30	0.0%	0
Campbell	45.7%	7,187	53.1%	8,366	1.2%	187	0.0%	3
Caroline	60.8%	3,590	38.5%	2,274	0.6%	34	0.1%	4
Carroll	42.3%	3,309	57.2%	4,481	0.5%	40	0.0%	0
Charles City	73.1%	1,747	26.4%	631	0.5%	13	0.0%	0
Charlotte	51.4%	2,202	46.9%	2,012	1.7%	73	0.0%	0
Charlottesville	72.9%	6,781	24.9%	2,316	2.1%	193	0.2%	16
Chesapeake	45.8%	24,087	53.8%	28,328	0.4%	201	0.0%	17
Chesterfield	41.9%	33,810	57.3%	46,160	0.7%	534	0.1%	94
Clarke	49.3%	1,839	49.7%	1,851	0.9%	34	0.1%	3
Colonial Heights	32.1%	1,758	66.9%	3,660	0.7%	41	0.3%	14
Covington	62.7%	1,071	34.9%	597	2.4%	41	0.0%	0
Craig	50.3%	918	48.6%	887	1.0%	19	0.1%	1
Culpeper	42.0%	3,721	57.1%	5,054	0.8%	74	0.0%	0
Cumberland	50.0%	1,315	47.7%	1,255	2.4%	62	0.0%	0
Danville	53.5%	7,346	44.8%	6,150	1.7%	231	0.0%	3
Dickenson	61.0%	2,907	38.6%	1,837	0.4%	19	0.0%	0
Dinwiddie	52.3%	3,578	46.8%	3,202	0.8%	55	0.0%	1
Emporia	59.4%	912	40.1%	616	0.5%	7	0.0%	0
Essex	54.2%	1,436	45.4%	1,203	0.4%	10	0.1%	2
Fairfax County	54.5%	146,537	44.9%	120,799	0.6%	1,586	0.0%	92
Fairfax	51.7%	3,478	47.6%	3,203	0.6%	43	0.0%	0
Falls Church	65.8%	2,623	33.3%	1,326	0.9%	35	0.0%	1
Fauquier	42.2%	6,952	57.2%	9,420	0.6%	91	0.1%	9
Floyd	46.6%	2,093	51.9%	2,331	1.5%	69	0.0%	0
Fluvanna	47.0%	3,118	51.7%	3,425	1.3%	86	0.0%	1
Franklin County	51.3%	7,182	47.9%	6,703	0.8%	111	0.0%	0
Franklin	64.5%	1,434	35.1%	781	0.3%	6	0.0%	1
Frederick	39.0%	6,433	60.3%	9,947	0.7%	113	0.0%	6
Fredericksburg	61.0%	2,717	37.7%	1,679	1.2%	55	0.1%	5
Galax	54.0%	866	45.7%	733	0.4%	6	0.0%	0
Giles	56.5%	3,071	41.9%	2,276	1.6%	85	0.0%	0
Gloucester	44.8%	4,116	54.5%	5,010	0.7%	68	0.0%	2
Goochland	47.3%	3,091	51.9%	3,394	0.7%	46	0.1%	6
Grayson	46.7%	2,507	52.6%	2,824	0.7%	40	0.0%	0
Greene	41.7%	1,644	56.9%	2,244	1.4%	56	0.0%	0
Greensville	68.6%	1,859	31.0%	841	0.3%	8	0.0%	1
Halifax	54.8%	5,506	43.4%	4,366	1.8%	178	0.0%	1
Hampton	63.7%	20,627	35.8%	11,592	0.5%	157	0.0%	16
Hanover	38.2%	11,713	61.1%	18,757	0.7%	201	0.1%	20
Harrisonburg	47.7%	3,083	51.5%	3,334	0.8%	49	0.0%	2
Henrico	51.4%	42,089	47.9%	39,215	0.6%	514	0.1%	85
Henry	61.4%	9,872	36.9%	5,942	1.7%	270	0.0%	1
Highland	48.0%	533	51.2%	568	0.8%	9	0.0%	0
Hopewell	49.4%	2,467	48.8%	2,435	1.8%	88	0.1%	4
Isle of Wight	49.9%	4,727	49.7%	4,708	0.3%	32	0.0%	4
James City	49.3%	8,505	50.2%	8,654	0.5%	86	0.0%	6
King and Queen	57.3%	1,188	42.0%	872	0.7%	14	0.0%	0
King George	49.2%	2,110	50.1%	2,151	0.7%	29	0.0%	1
King William	49.4%	1,942	49.9%	1,960	0.6%	25	0.1%	2
Lancaster	45.7%	2,025	53.5%	2,373	0.7%	29	0.1%	5
Lee	53.3%	2,923	46.2%	2,536	0.5%	25	0.0%	0
Lexington	64.6%	1,053	33.9%	552	1.5%	24	0.0%	0
Loudoun	45.8%	20,907	53.4%	24,372	0.7%	310	0.0%	20
Louisa	53.7%	4,244	45.2%	3,568	1.1%	89	0.0%	1
Lunenburg	54.7%	1,996	44.7%	1,634	0.6%	21	0.0%	1
Lynchburg	53.0%	9,314	46.3%	8,132	0.6%	112	0.1%	10
Madison	44.9%	1,794	53.1%	2,121	1.9%	76	0.0%	1
Manassas	45.7%	2,992	53.8%	3,520	0.5%	31	0.0%	0
Manassas Park	46.3%	691	52.9%	790	0.7%	11	0.1%	2
Martinsville	67.0%	2,769	32.6%	1,346	0.4%	16	0.0%	1
Mathews	46.4%	1,516	52.4%	1,712	1.1%	37	0.0%	0
Mecklenburg	46.7%	3,519	51.7%	3,898	1.6%	124	0.0%	0
Middlesex	47.6%	1,757	50.4%	1,861	2.0%	74	0.0%	0
Montgomery	55.7%	11,154	43.1%	8,639	1.1%	228	0.1%	13
Nelson	59.4%	2,681	39.1%	1,763	1.5%	68	0.0%	1
New Kent	45.6%	2,161	53.5%	2,532	0.8%	37	0.1%	7
Newport News	57.0%	21,318	42.5%	15,920	0.4%	168	0.0%	16
Norfolk	65.2%	28,244	34.0%	14,741	0.7%	294	0.0%	14
Northampton	64.2%	2,316	34.2%	1,236	1.6%	58	0.0%	0
Northumberland	49.7%	2,166	49.6%	2,159	0.6%	26	0.1%	4
Norton	67.6%	773	32.0%	366	0.4%	5	0.0%	0
Nottoway	57.4%	2,513	41.6%	1,824	1.0%	43	0.0%	1
Orange	47.5%	3,617	51.3%	3,902	1.2%	94	0.0%	0
Page	42.4%	2,443	57.2%	3,292	0.4%	21	0.0%	1
Patrick	48.3%	2,651	50.6%	2,775	1.0%	56	0.0%	1
Petersburg	82.0%	7,018	17.6%	1,509	0.4%	32	0.0%	0
Pittsylvania	42.5%	7,462	56.0%	9,831	1.5%	270	0.0%	5
Poquoson	35.7%	1,489	63.7%	2,656	0.6%	25	0.0%	1
Portsmouth	65.7%	17,336	33.8%	8,922	0.4%	103	0.0%	13
Powhatan	36.8%	2,558	62.4%	4,338	0.8%	58	0.0%	3
Prince Edward	58.6%	2,874	40.1%	1,967	1.3%	64	0.0%	0
Prince George	45.1%	3,414	54.2%	4,104	0.6%	43	0.1%	9
Prince William	46.8%	27,297	52.4%	30,543	0.9%	497	0.0%	5
Pulaski	53.0%	5,109	45.8%	4,411	1.2%	115	0.0%	4
Radford	58.9%	1,876	40.2%	1,280	0.8%	26	0.0%	1
Rappahannock	48.0%	1,284	51.2%	1,369	0.7%	20	0.1%	2
Richmond County	49.1%	1,101	50.1%	1,124	0.8%	17	0.0%	0
Richmond	73.3%	35,558	25.6%	12,432	1.1%	514	0.1%	33
Roanoke County	47.0%	14,993	52.4%	16,713	0.6%	204	0.0%	7
Roanoke	62.1%	15,348	37.0%	9,147	0.8%	204	0.0%	0
Rockbridge	50.3%	2,972	48.9%	2,885	0.7%	44	0.0%	2
Rockingham	36.0%	6,642	63.5%	11,723	0.5%	97	0.1%	10
Russell	60.4%	4,507	38.9%	2,907	0.7%	53	0.0%	0
Salem	49.7%	4,067	49.4%	4,042	0.8%	66	0.0%	0
Scott	42.8%	2,877	56.1%	3,772	1.2%	78	0.0%	0
Shenandoah	40.2%	4,531	59.1%	6,653	0.6%	72	0.1%	7
Smyth	51.4%	4,691	47.7%	4,354	0.9%	85	0.0%	0
Southampton	60.2%	2,790	39.4%	1,827	0.3%	15	0.0%	0
Spotsylvania	45.8%	9,742	53.8%	11,447	0.4%	89	0.0%	5
Stafford	43.2%	9,248	56.1%	12,019	0.6%	132	0.1%	23
Staunton	48.8%	3,141	50.6%	3,256	0.6%	38	0.0%	2
Suffolk	53.1%	9,124	46.5%	7,996	0.3%	59	0.0%	2
Surry	65.5%	1,550	33.9%	801	0.6%	14	0.0%	0
Sussex	61.6%	1,924	36.3%	1,134	2.1%	66	0.0%	0
Tazewell	54.3%	5,250	44.9%	4,335	0.8%	76	0.0%	0
Virginia Beach	46.3%	43,495	53.0%	49,800	0.6%	560	0.0%	35
Warren	44.6%	3,546	54.2%	4,311	1.2%	97	0.1%	5
Washington	45.3%	6,703	53.8%	7,972	0.9%	130	0.0%	3
Waynesboro	42.9%	2,109	56.5%	2,777	0.4%	21	0.1%	4
Westmoreland	57.6%	2,471	41.0%	1,759	1.5%	63	0.0%	0
Williamsburg	57.5%	1,475	41.6%	1,067	0.9%	24	0.0%	0
Winchester	51.4%	3,155	47.7%	2,928	0.8%	50	0.0%	0
Wise	58.5%	5,509	40.5%	3,816	1.0%	92	0.0%	4
Wythe	48.6%	3,822	50.7%	3,991	0.6%	47	0.1%	9
York	45.0%	7,530	54.3%	9,083	0.6%	100	0.0%	5

==== Counties and independent cities that flipped from Republican to Democratic ====
- Accomack (largest city: Chincoteague)
- Albemarle (largest municipality: Scottsville)
- Appomattox (largest city: Appomattox)
- Bedford (independent city)
- Buena Vista (independent city)
- Danville (independent city)
- Galax (independent city)
- Giles (largest city: Pearisburg)
- King and Queen (largest CDP: King and Queen Courthouse)
- Fairfax (independent city)
- Fairfax (largest municipality: Herndon)
- Henrico (largest borough: Richmond)
- Prince Edward (largest city: Farmville)
- Westmoreland (largest city: Colonial Beach)
- Winchester (independent city)
- Lynchburg (independent city)
- Southampton (largest municipality: Courtland)
- Amherst (largest city: Amherst)
- Bath (largest city: Hot Springs)
- Buckingham (largest city: Dillwyn)
- Charlotte (largest city: Keysville)
- Craig (largest city: New Castle)
- Cumberland (largest city: Farmville)
- Dinwiddie (largest town: McKenney)
- Essex (largest city: Tappahannock)
- Emporia (independent city)
- Franklin (largest city: Rocky Mount)
- Halifax (largest city: South Boston)
- Hopewell (independent city)
- Isle of Wight (largest city: Smithfield)
- Salem (independent city)
- Louisa (largest city: Louisa)
- Lee (largest city: Pennington Gap)
- Northumberland (largest city: Heathsville)
- Pulaski (largest city: Pulaski)
- Rockbridge (largest city: Lexington)
- Smyth (largest city: Marion)
- Tazewell (largest city: Richlands)
- Wise (largest city: Big Stone Gap)
- Nottoway (largest city: Blackstone)
- Montgomery (largest city: Blacksburg)
- Newport News (independent city)
- Suffolk (independent city)
- Northampton (largest city: Exmore)
- Henry (largest city: Blacksburg)
- Alleghany (largest city: Clifton Forge)

== See also ==
- 2001 Virginia lieutenant gubernatorial election
- 2001 Virginia Attorney General election
- 2001 Virginia House of Delegates election
- 2001 Virginia elections
