= Virginia's 94th House of Delegates district =

Virginia legislative district

District map from the 2023 election

Virginia's 94th House of Delegates district elects one of the 100 members of the Virginia House of Delegates, the lower house of the state's bicameral legislature. The district is made up of part of Newport News, Virginia.

The district has been represented by Democrat Shelly Simonds since 2020. In 2017, an extremely close race in this district made national headlines. Following a three-judge panel decision declaring the race a tie, the winner of the 2017 general election was determined by lot with David Yancey winning.

== Recent election results ==
Virginia's 94th House of Delegates district, 2013
Party	Candidate	Votes	%
Republican	David Yancey (incumbent)	11,001	51.2
Democratic	Robert Farinholt, Jr.	10,458	48.6
Write-in		47	0.2
Total votes		21,506	100.0
Republican hold			

Virginia's 94th House of Delegates district, 2015
Party	Candidate	Votes	%
Republican	David Yancey (incumbent)	8,140	57.6
Democratic	Shelly Simonds	6,002	42.4
Total votes		14,142	100.0
Republican hold			

=== 2017 tie ===
The district's election in 2017 was unusually close. Shelly Simonds challenged Yancey for the second time. Unofficial election night results showed Yancey with a 12-vote lead. The race had statewide significance because if Yancey were to win, Republicans would hold a majority in the House of Delegates, but if Simonds were to win, the parties would each have 50 seats, which would have required a power-sharing agreement in the chamber. On November 20, the Virginia State Board of Elections certified Yancey as the winner by 10 votes. Simonds requested a recount. The recount gave Simonds the win by a single vote. Following this, a three-judge panel decided that a potential overvote ballot should be counted for Yancey, thus tying the race. The potential overvote ballot shows a vote for both Simonds and Yancey with Simonds' crossed out, but also shows the vote for the governor crossed out. The winner was set to be decided based on drawing a name out of a bowl on December 27. Appeals by Simonds' campaign postponed the drawing until January 4, 2018. At that time, David Yancey's name was drawn by lot and he was declared the winner. The loser of such a drawing maintains the right to ask for another recount. On January 10, 2018, Simonds declared that she would not seek a second recount and that she was conceding the race to Yancey.

Virginia's 94th House of Delegates district, 2017
Party	Candidate	Votes	%
Republican	David Yancey (incumbent)	11,608	48.59
Democratic	Shelly Simonds	11,608	48.59
Libertarian	Michael Bartley	675	2.83
Total votes		23,891	100.0
Republican hold			

Virginia's 94th House of Delegates district, 2019
Party	Candidate	Votes	%
Democratic	Shelly Simonds	11,563	57.7
Republican	David Yancey (incumbent)	8,070	40.3
Libertarian	Michael Bartley	376	1.9
Write-in		25	0.1
Total votes		20,034	100.0
Democratic gain from Republican			

Virginia's 94th House of Delegates district, 2021
Party	Candidate	Votes	%
Democratic	Shelly Simonds (incumbent)	13,725	56.0
Republican	Russ Harper	10,734	43.8
Write-in		54	0.2
Total votes		24,513	100.0
Democratic hold			

== List of delegates ==
Delegate	Party	Years	Electoral history
Alan Diamonstein	Democratic	January 12, 1983 – January 9, 2002	Ran for Lieutenant Governor
Glenn Oder	Republican	January 9, 2002 – August 31, 2011	Resigned
David Yancey	Republican	January 11, 2012 – January 8, 2020	Lost reelection
Shelly Simonds	Democratic	January 8, 2020 – present	First elected in 2019
