= Jay K. Katzen =

American politician (1936–2020)

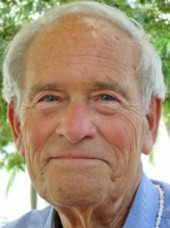

Member of the Virginia House of Delegates from the 31st district
- In office January 12, 1994 – January 9, 2002
- Preceded by: Jerry Wood
- Succeeded by: Scott Lingamfelter

Personal details
- Born: Jay Kenneth Katzen; August 23, 1936 Brooklyn, New York, U.S.
- Died: April 9, 2020 (aged 83) Talkeetna, Alaska, U.S.
- Party: Republican
- Spouse: Patricia Ann Morse
- Education: Princeton University (BA); Yale University (MA)

Jay Kenneth Katzen (August 23, 1936 – April 9, 2020) was an American diplomat, business consultant, state legislator, and government agency administrator, and former President of the Victims of Communism Memorial Foundation. He graduated from Princeton University (1958) and Yale University (1959) and served United States presidents Dwight D. Eisenhower through George H. W. Bush. His positions included White House translator and U.S. representative to the United Nations. From 1977 to 1979 he served chargé d'affairs ad interim to Congo (Brazzaville). He became active in Virginia politics when elected in 1993 to represent the 31st legislative district of the Virginia House of Delegates. In 2001, he was the Republican Party's nominee for Lieutenant Governor of Virginia.

He received his B.A. (magna cum laude) in Political Science from Princeton University in 1958 and his M.A. in International Relations from Yale University the following year. He attended the National War College in 1977, was a visiting professor at the Boston College Graduate School of Management 1978-79, and was a member of advisory boards at the Duke University Primate Center in 1986 and the University of Kentucky’s Patterson School of Diplomacy and International Commerce in 1989.

Jay and his wife of 56 years, Paddy, were driving forces in the construction of the Victims of Communism Memorial in Washington, D.C. He was chairman of the Board of the Combat Wounded Veteran Challenge. The Katzens moved to Alaska in 2009, where he continued his service as a National Park Ranger.

== U.S. Government ==
From 1959 to 1979, Jay Katzen served as a career Foreign Service Officer with the U.S. Department of State. His posts included Australia, Burundi, Congo (Kinshasa), communist Romania, Mali, the U.S. Mission to the United Nations in New York, and Congo (Brazzaville). He also was assigned to Washington D.C. – at the State Department and the White House. His responsibilities included consular affairs, promoting American business, political and economic reporting, labor affairs, multilateral negotiation and management. He served as Chargé d'Affaires at two posts, in one instance, opening and maintaining an embassy.

Katzen was trained at the U.S. State Department’s Foreign Service Institute to speak five languages: French, Romanian, Swahili, Lingala and Kirundi.

In 1990, Katzen was appointed by President Reagan and confirmed by the U.S. Senate as Vice Chairman of the Board of the African Development Foundation, and served in that capacity for two years.

From February 2004 to January 2009, Katzen served as the U.S. Peace Corps’ Regional Director overseeing 19 programs in Europe, the Mediterranean area, and Asia. From August 2005 to May 2006, he served concurrently as Acting Chief of Staff/Chief of Operations of the Peace Corps.

In 2011, Katzen was a Park Ranger at the Talkeetna Ranger Station in Denali National Park, Alaska.

== Legislative experience ==
Katzen was elected in 1993 to represent the 31st legislative district of Fauquier, Rappahannock, and Warren counties in Virginia's House of Delegates. He was chosen freshman class president, a party whip, and co-patroned over 2,500 bills, including landmark legislation improving the quality of Virginia’s education, and reforming welfare and law enforcement. He served on the Finance, Education, and Agriculture Committees, on the Governor’s Blue Ribbon Commission on Champion Schools, and on the Council on Indians. He was re-elected twice.

Katzen was the Republican Party’s nominee for Lieutenant Governor in 2001 and for United States Congress in Virginia’s Ninth District in 2002.

== Private sector ==
In 2003, Katzen was chosen in a national search to become CEO and President of the Victims of Communism Memorial Foundation, charged by Congress and the White House—with bipartisan support—to erect a memorial in Washington to the 100 million victims of communism. The monument was unveiled and dedicated by the Foundation’s Honorary Chairman, President George W. Bush, in June 2007.

From 1979 to 1991, Katzen served as a senior advisor reporting directly to the chairmen and senior executives of corporations including Bechtel, Consolidated Gold Fields, Fluor, Kennecott, Newmont Mining, and Phelps Dodge, helping to steer those companies to successful investment opportunities abroad.

== Recognition ==
Katzen has been recognized by the National Federation of Independent Business, the Vietnam Veterans of America, Virginia’s Council of Indians, 4-H, the Virginia Society for Human Life, the National Vietnam and Gulf War Veterans Coalition, and Virginia’s Armenian community. He served as chairman of the Rappahannock River Basin Commission, and as a board member of the Jamestown-Yorktown Foundation. Katzen was named the Family Foundation’s Legislator of the Year, and is a recipient of a Martin Luther King Jr. award. He is past president of his local Lions Club International and was a member of Rotary International.

== Personal life ==
Katzen died on April 9, 2020, at the age of 83 at his home in Talkeetna, Alaska.
