= 2002 United States House of Representatives elections in Virginia =

- November 5, 2002

All 11 Virginia seats to the United States House of Representatives
	Majority party	Minority party
Party	Republican	Democratic
Last election	6 seats, 46.74%	4 seats, 43.79%
Seats before	7	3
Seats won	8	3
Seat change	▲2	▼1
Popular vote	1,007,749	440,478
Percentage	66.45%	29.05%
Swing	▲19.71%	▼14.74%

Republican
40–50%
50–60%
60–70%
70–80%
80–90%
90–100%
Democratic
50–60%
60–70%
70–80%
90–100%

The 2002 United States House of Representatives elections in Virginia were held on November 5, 2002, to determine who will represent the Commonwealth of Virginia in the United States House of Representatives. Virginia has eleven seats in the House, apportioned according to the 2000 United States census. Representatives are elected for two-year terms.

== Overview ==
=== Statewide ===
Party	Candidates	Votes		Seats		
Party	Candidates	No.	%	No.	+/–	%
Republican	10	1,007,749	66.45	8	▲2	71.43
Democratic	6	440,478	29.05	3	▼1	28.57
Constitution	1	26,892	1.77	0	Steady	0.0
Green	1	20,589	1.36	0	Steady	0.0
Libertarian	1	4,558	0.30	0	Steady	0.0
Write-in	11	16,216	1.07	0	Steady	0.0
Total	30	1,516,482	100.0	11	Steady	100.0

Popular vote
Republican	66.45%
Democratic	29.05%
Constitution	1.77%
Green	1.36%
Other	1.37%

House seats
Republican	72.73%
Democratic	27.27%

=== By district ===
Results of the 2002 United States House of Representatives elections in Virginia by district:

District	Republican		Democratic		Others		Total		Result
District	Votes	%	Votes	%	Votes	%	Votes	%	Result
District 1	113,168	95.91%	0	0.00%	4,829	4.09%	117,997	100.0%	Republican hold
District 2	103,807	83.15%	0	0.00%	21,039	16.85%	124,846	100.0%	Republican hold
District 3	0	0.00%	87,521	96.10%	3,552	3.90%	91,073	100.0%	Democratic hold
District 4	108,733	97.92%	0	0.00%	2,308	2.08%	111,041	100.0%	Republican hold
District 5	95,360	63.47%	54,805	36.48%	68	0.05%	150,233	100.0%	Republican Gain
District 6	105,530	97.06%	0	0.00%	3,202	2.94%	108,732	100.0%	Democratic hold
District 7	113,658	69.45%	49,854	30.46%	153	0.09%	163,665	100.0%	Republican hold
District 8	64,121	37.32%	102,759	59.81%	4,919	2.86%	171,799	100.0%	Democratic hold
District 9	52,076	34.22%	100,075	65.76%	32	0.02%	152,183	100.0%	Democratic hold
District 10	115,917	71.72%	45,464	28.13%	234	0.14%	161,615	100.0%	Republican hold
District 11	135,379	82.90%	0	0.00%	27,919	17.10%	163,298	100.0%	Republican hold
Total	1,007,749	66.45%	440,478	29.05%	163,298	4.50%	1,516,482	100.0%	

== District 1 ==
2002 Virginia's 1st congressional district election
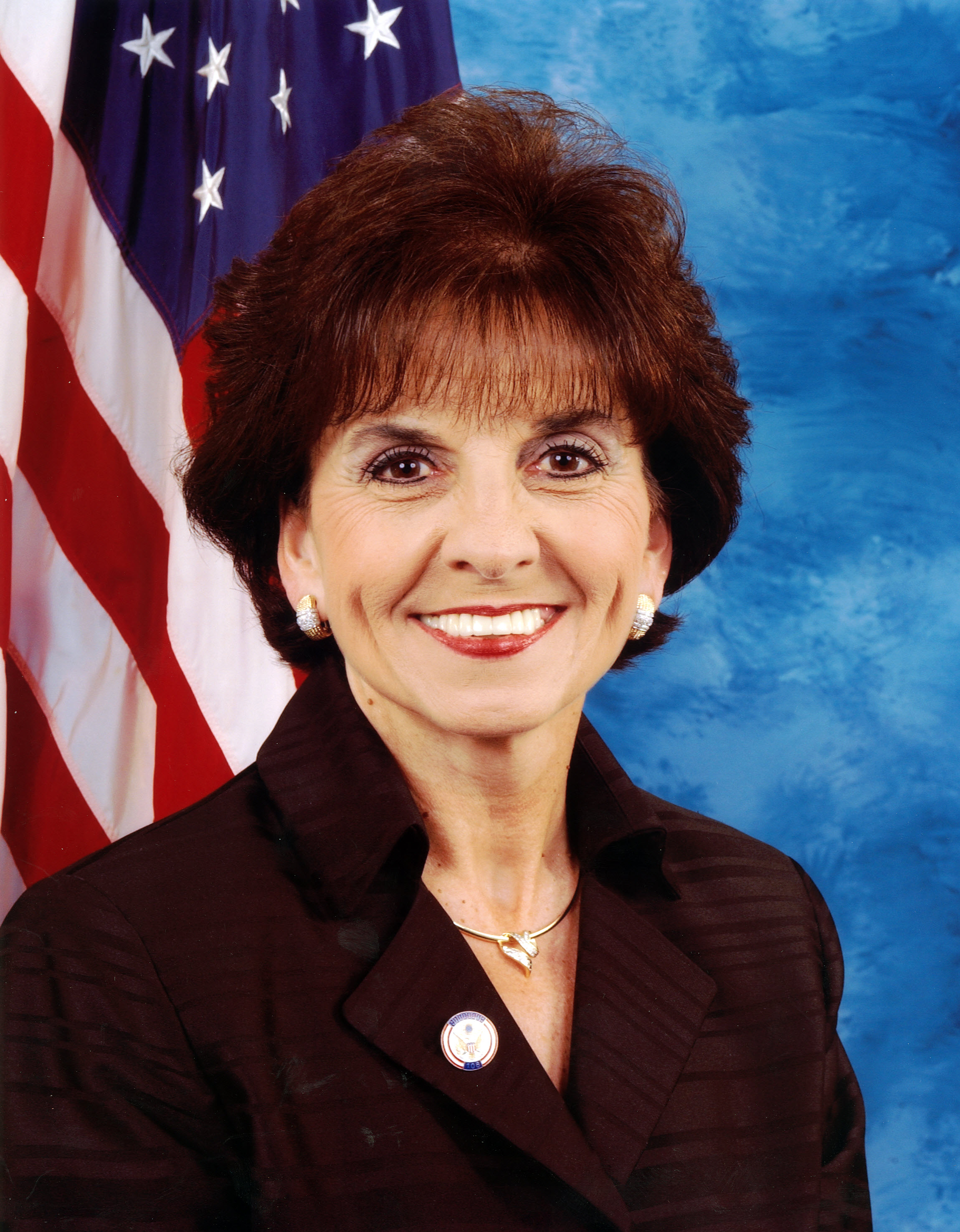
Candidate	Jo Ann Davis
Party	Republican
Popular vote	113,168
Percentage	95.9%
- County and independent city results Davis: 90–100% 100–100%
U.S. Representative before election
Jo Ann Davis
Republican
Elected U.S. Representative
Jo Ann Davis
Republican

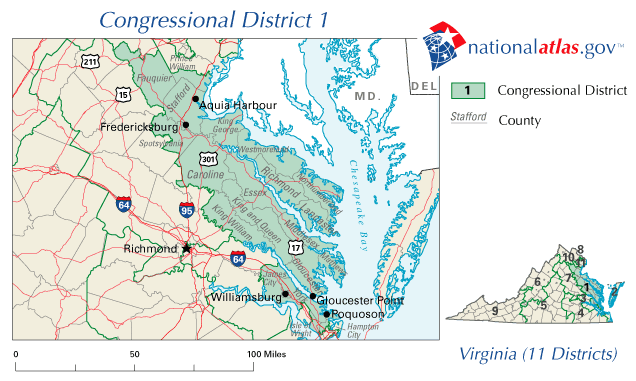

Incumbent Republican Jo Ann Davis, who had represented the district since 2001, ran for re-election. She was elected with 57.5% of the vote in 2000.

=== Republican primary ===
==== Candidates ====
===== Nominee =====
- Jo Ann Davis, incumbent U.S. Representative

=== Democratic primary ===
No Democrats filed to run.

=== Green primary ===
==== Candidates ====
===== Nominee =====
- Harry Nielsen, businessman (write in)

=== General election ===
==== Predictions ====
Source	Ranking	As of
Sabato's Crystal Ball	Safe R	November 4, 2002
New York Times	Safe R	October 14, 2002

==== Results ====
Virginia's 1st congressional district election, 2002
Party	Candidate	Votes	%
Republican	Jo Ann Davis (incumbent)	113,168	95.9
Write-in		4,829	4.1
Majority		108,339	91.8
Total votes		117,997	100.0
Republican hold			

== District 2 ==
2002 Virginia's 2nd congressional district election
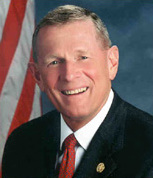

Candidate	Ed Schrock	D.C. Amarasinghe
Party	Republican	Green
Popular vote	103,807	20,589
Percentage	83.1%	16.5%
- County and independent city results Schrock: 70–80% 80–90%
U.S. Representative before election
Ed Schrock
Republican
Elected U.S. Representative
Ed Schrock
Republican

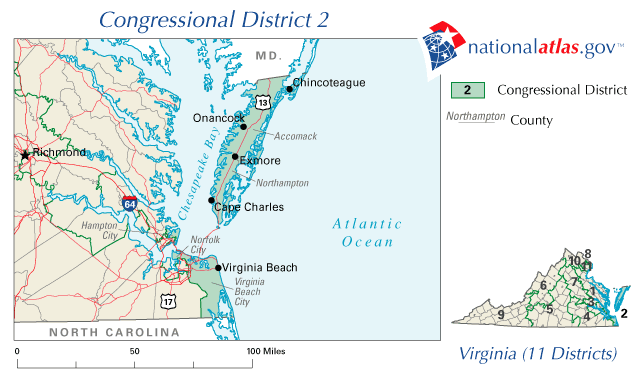

Incumbent Republican Ed Schrock, who had represented the district since 2001, ran for re-election. He was elected with 52.0% of the vote in 2000.

=== Republican primary ===
==== Candidates ====
===== Nominee =====
- Ed Schrock, incumbent U.S. Representative

=== Democratic primary ===
==== Candidates ====
===== Declined =====
- Jody Wagner, Virginia State Treasurer and nominee for this seat in 2000

=== Green primary ===
==== Candidates ====
===== Nominee =====
- D.C. Amarasinghe, doctor

=== General election ===
==== Predictions ====
Source	Ranking	As of
Sabato's Crystal Ball	Safe R	November 4, 2002
New York Times	Safe R	October 14, 2002

==== Results ====
Virginia's 2nd congressional district election, 2002
Party	Candidate	Votes	%
Republican	Ed Schrock (incumbent)	103,807	83.1
Green	D.C. Amarasinghe	20,589	16.5
Write-in		450	0.4
Majority		83,218	66.7
Total votes		124,846	100.0
Republican hold			

== District 3 ==
2002 Virginia's 3rd congressional district election
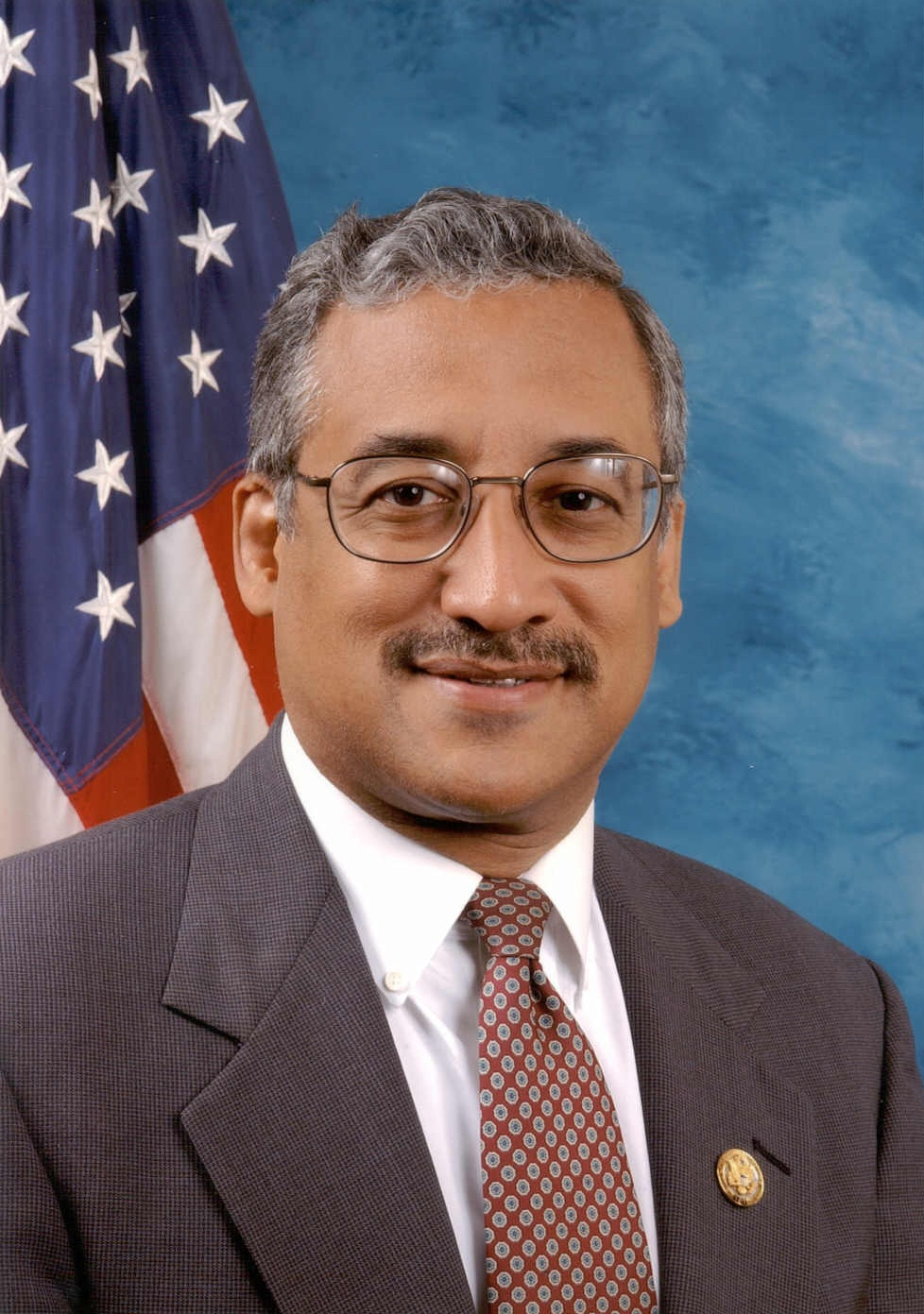
Candidate	Bobby Scott
Party	Democratic
Popular vote	87,521
Percentage	96.1%
U.S. Representative before election
Bobby Scott
Democratic
Elected U.S. Representative
Bobby Scott
Democratic

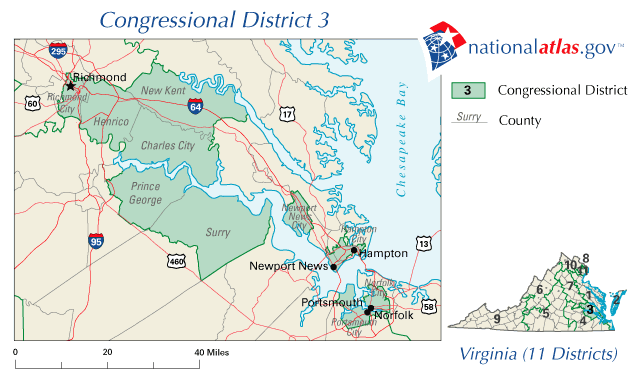

Incumbent Democrat Bobby Scott, who had represented the district since 1993, ran for re-election. He was re-elected with 97.7% of the vote in 2000.

=== Democratic primary ===
==== Candidates ====
===== Nominee =====
- Bobby Scott, incumbent U.S. Representative

=== Republican primary ===
No Republican filed to run.

=== General election ===
==== Predictions ====
Source	Ranking	As of
Sabato's Crystal Ball	Safe D	November 4, 2002
New York Times	Safe D	October 14, 2002

==== Results ====
Virginia's 3rd congressional district election, 2002
Party	Candidate	Votes	%
Democratic	Bobby Scott (incumbent)	87,521	96.1
Write-in		3,552	3.9
Majority		83,969	92.2
Total votes		91,073	100.0
Democratic hold			

== District 4 ==
2002 Virginia's 4th congressional district election
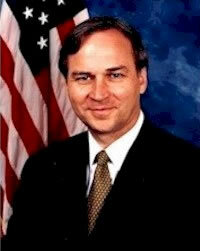
Candidate	Randy Forbes
Party	Republican
Popular vote	108,733
Percentage	97.9%
U.S. Representative before election
Randy Forbes
Republican
Elected U.S. Representative
Randy Forbes
Republican

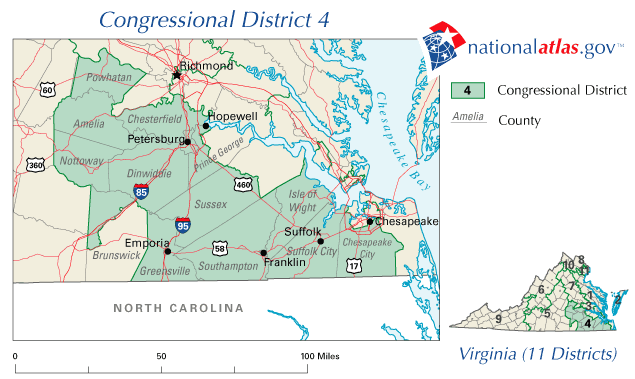

Incumbent Republican Randy Forbes, who had represented the district since 2001, ran for re-election. He was elected with 52.0% of the vote in a 2001 special election.

=== Republican primary ===
==== Candidates ====
===== Nominee =====
- Randy Forbes, incumbent U.S. Representative

=== Democratic primary ===
==== Candidates ====
===== Withdrawn =====
- Louise Lucas, state senator and nominee for this seat in 2001

===== Declined =====
- Mark Sisisky, son of former U.S. Representative Norman Sisisky

=== General election ===
==== Predictions ====
Source	Ranking	As of
Sabato's Crystal Ball	Safe R	November 4, 2002
New York Times	Safe R	October 14, 2002

==== Results ====
Virginia's 4th congressional district election, 2002
Party	Candidate	Votes	%
Republican	Randy Forbes (incumbent)	108,733	97.9
Write-in		2,308	2.1
Majority		106,425	95.8
Total votes		111,041	100.0
Republican hold			

== District 5 ==
2002 Virginia's 5th congressional district election
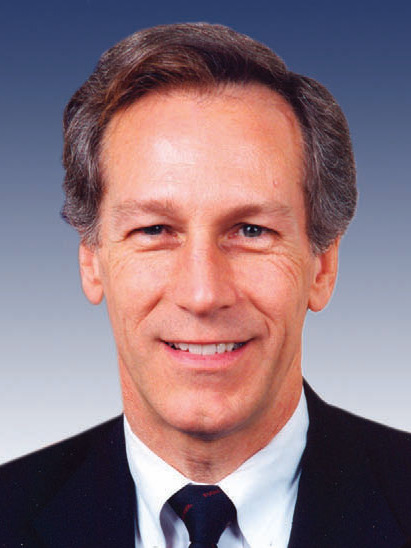

Candidate	Virgil Goode	Meredith Richards
Party	Republican	Democratic
Popular vote	95,360	54,805
Percentage	63.5%	36.5%
- County results Goode: 50–60% 60–70% 70–80% Richards: 50–60% 60–70%
U.S. Representative before election
Virgil Goode
Republican
Elected U.S. Representative
Virgil Goode
Republican

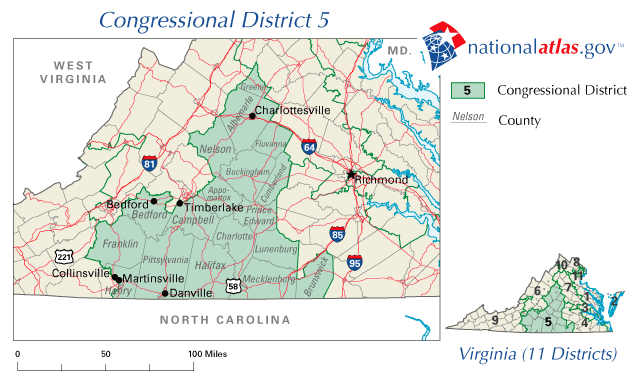

Incumbent Independent Virgil Goode, who had represented the district since 1997, first as Democrat before leaving the party in 2000, ran for re-election as a Republican having joined the party in August 2002. He was re-elected with 67.4% of the vote in 2000.

=== Republican primary ===
==== Candidates ====
===== Nominee =====
- Virgil Goode, incumbent U.S. Representative

=== Democratic primary ===
==== Candidates ====
===== Nominee =====
- Meredith Richards, Charlottesville City Council member and psychologist

===== Eliminated in primary =====
- George Shropshire, Teamsters union official

=== General election ===
==== Predictions ====
Source	Ranking	As of
Sabato's Crystal Ball	Safe R	November 4, 2002
New York Times	Safe R	October 14, 2002

==== Results ====
Virginia's 5th congressional district election, 2002
Party	Candidate	Votes	%
Republican	Virgil Goode (incumbent)	95,360	63.5
Democratic	Meredith Richards	54,805	36.5
Write-in		68	0.0
Majority		40,555	27.0
Total votes		150,233	100.0
Republican gain from Independent			

== District 6 ==
2002 Virginia's 6th congressional district election
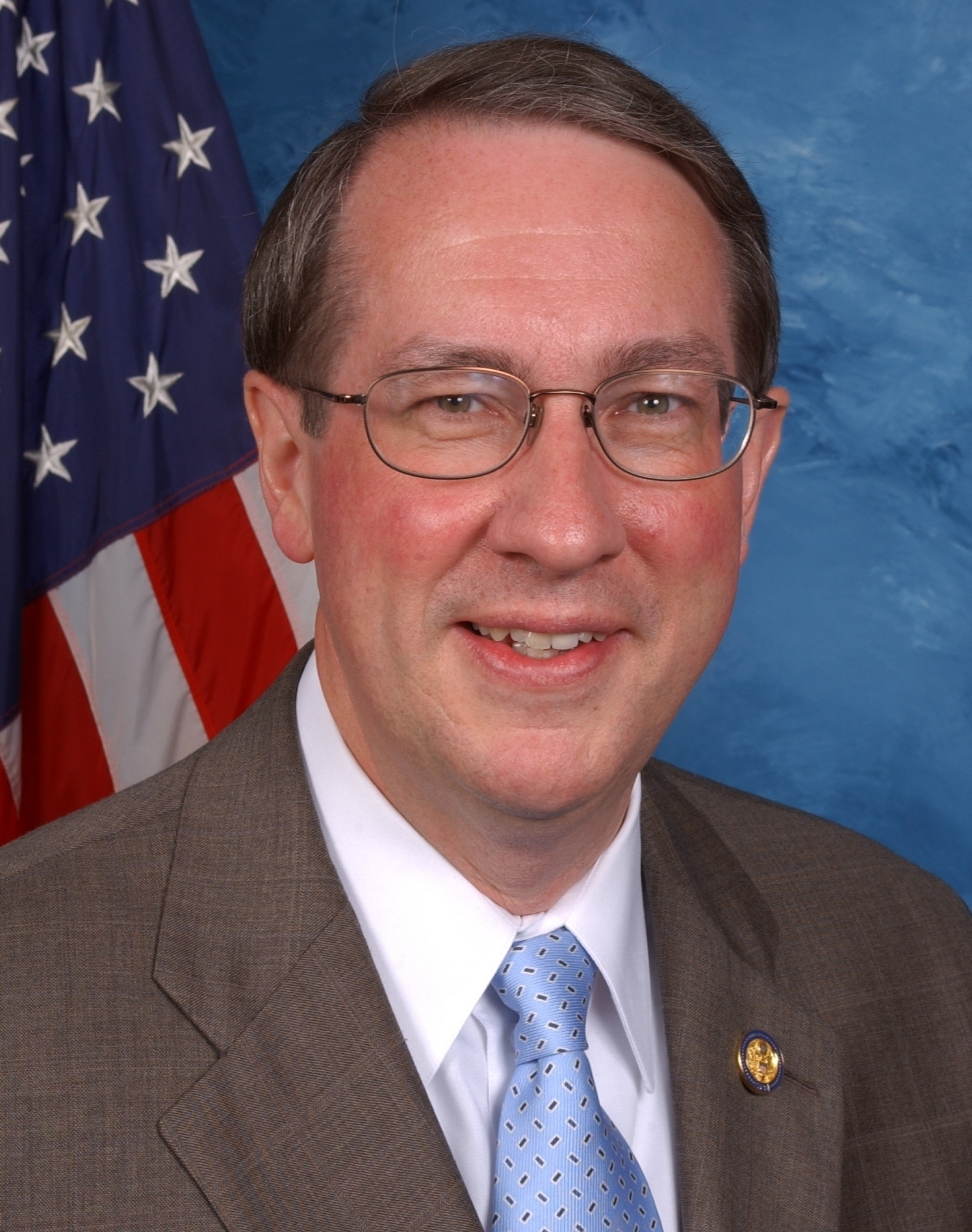
Candidate	Bob Goodlatte
Party	Republican
Popular vote	105,530
Percentage	97.1%
U.S. Representative before election
Bob Goodlatte
Republican
Elected U.S. Representative
Bob Goodlatte
Republican

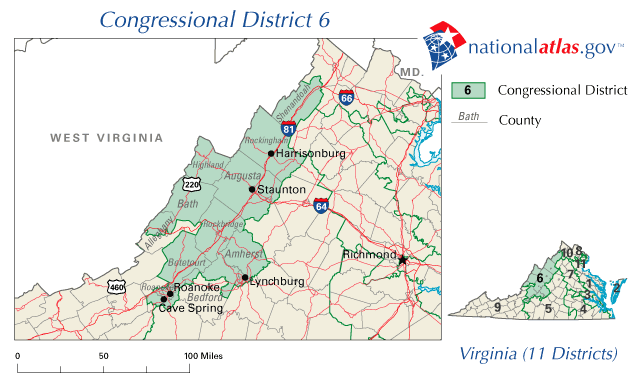

Incumbent Republican Bob Goodlatte, who had represented the district since 1993, ran for re-election. He was re-elected with 99.3% of the vote in 2000.

=== Republican primary ===
==== Candidates ====
===== Nominee =====
- Bob Goodlatte, incumbent U.S. Representative

=== Democratic primary ===
No Democrats filed to run.

=== Other Candidates ===
- Martin Jeffrey, ex-Roanoke NAACP president (Independent)

=== General election ===
==== Predictions ====
Source	Ranking	As of
Sabato's Crystal Ball	Safe R	November 4, 2002
New York Times	Safe R	October 14, 2002

==== Results ====
Virginia's 6th congressional district election, 2002
Party	Candidate	Votes	%
Republican	Bob Goodlatte (incumbent)	105,530	97.1
Write-in		3,202	2.9
Majority		102,328	94.1
Total votes		108,732	100.0
Republican hold			

== District 7 ==
2002 Virginia's 7th congressional district election
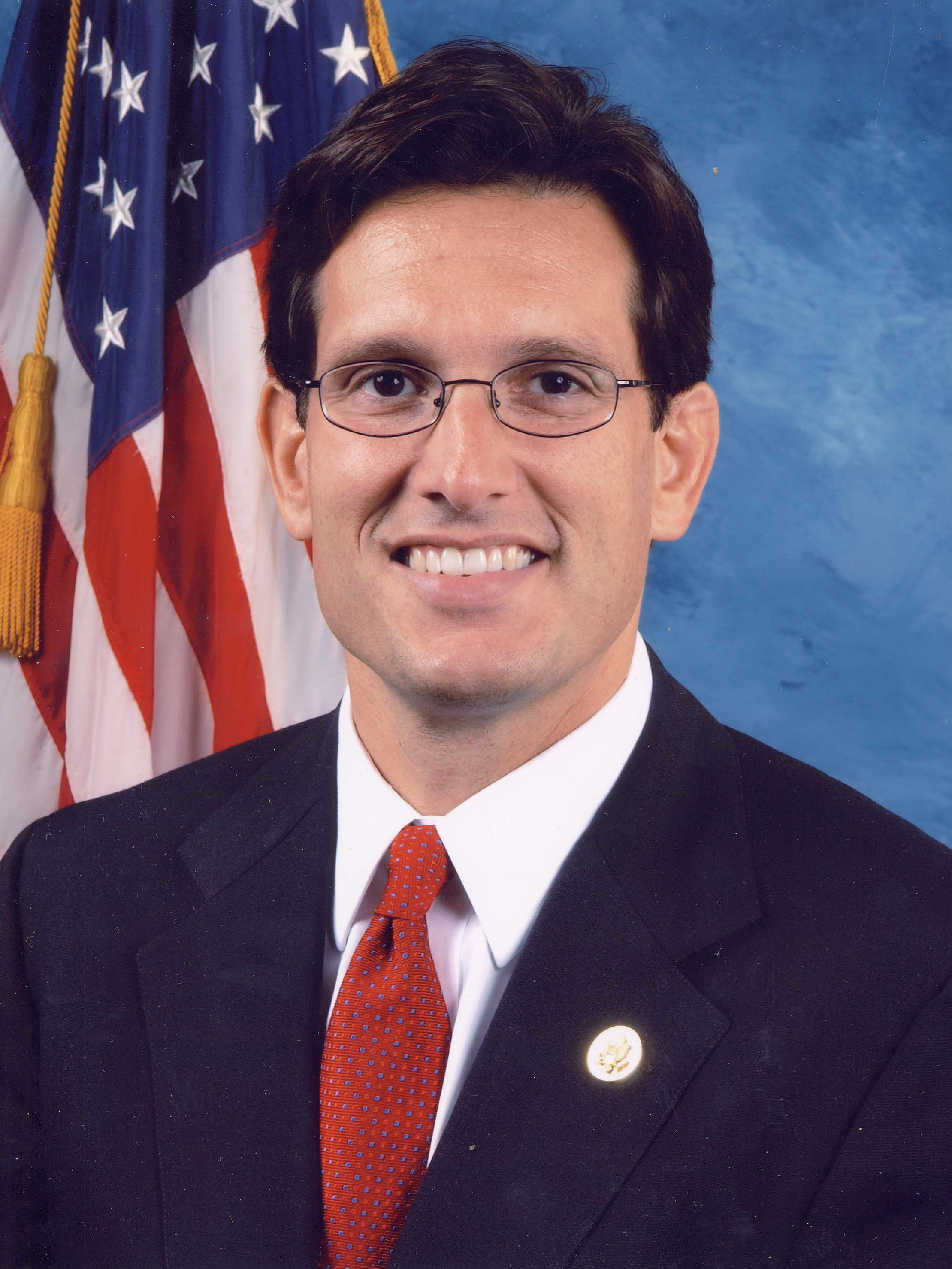

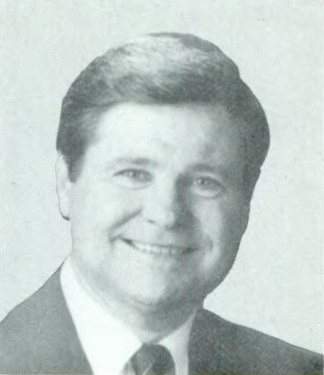
Candidate	Eric Cantor	Ben Jones
Party	Republican	Democratic
Popular vote	113,658	49,854
Percentage	69.4%	30.5%
- County results Cantor: 50–60% 60–70% 70–80% Jones: 50–60%
U.S. Representative before election
Eric Cantor
Republican
Elected U.S. Representative
Eric Cantor
Republican

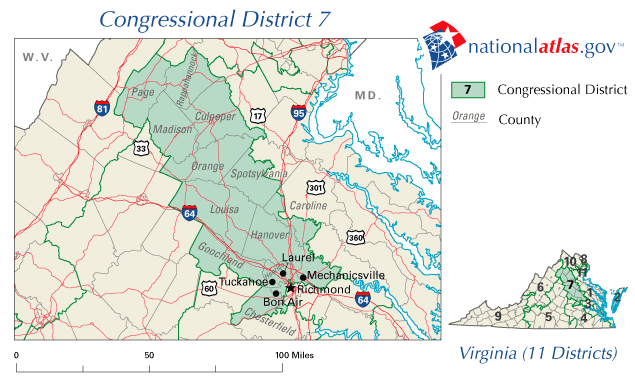

Incumbent Republican Eric Cantor, who had represented the district since 2000, ran for re-election. He was elected with 66.9% of the vote in 2000.

=== Republican primary ===
==== Candidates ====
===== Nominee =====
- Eric Cantor, incumbent U.S. Representative

=== Democratic primary ===
==== Candidates ====
===== Nominee =====
- Ben Jones, actor and former U.S. Representative from Georgia

=== General election ===
==== Predictions ====
Source	Ranking	As of
Sabato's Crystal Ball	Safe R	November 4, 2002
New York Times	Safe R	October 14, 2002

==== Results ====
Virginia's 7th congressional district election, 2002
Party	Candidate	Votes	%
Republican	Eric Cantor (incumbent)	113,658	69.4
Democratic	Ben Jones	49,854	30.5
Write-in		153	0.1
Majority		63,804	39.0
Total votes		163,665	100.00
Republican hold			

== District 8 ==
2002 Virginia's 8th congressional district election
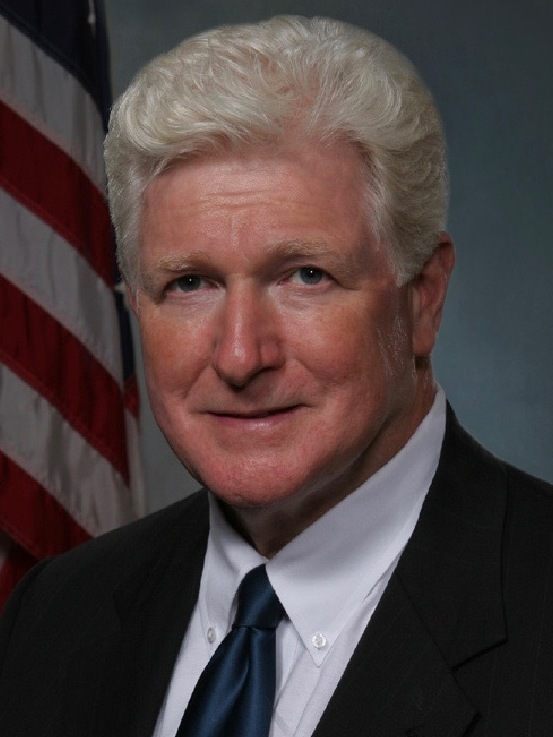

Candidate	Jim Moran	Scott Tate
Party	Democratic	Republican
Popular vote	102,759	64,121
Percentage	59.8%	37.3%
- County and independent city results Moran: 50–60% 60–70%
U.S. Representative before election
Jim Moran
Democratic
Elected U.S. Representative
Jim Moran
Democratic

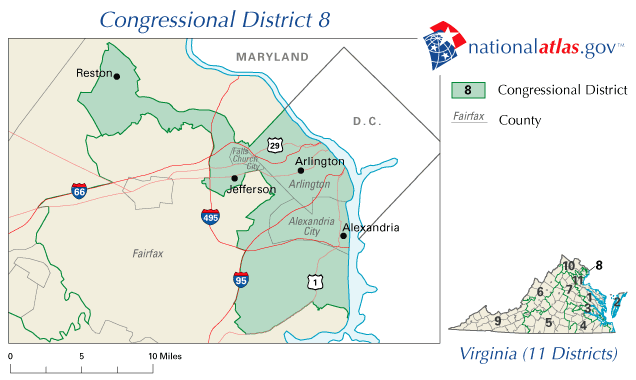

Incumbent Democrat Jim Moran, who had represented the district since 1985, ran for re-election. He was re-elected with 63.3% of the vote in 2000.

=== Democratic primary ===
==== Candidates ====
===== Nominee =====
- Jim Moran, incumbent U.S. Representative

=== Republican primary ===
==== Candidates ====
===== Nominee =====
- Scott Tate, internet consultant

===== Declined =====
- Joe McCain, actor, newspaper reporter, and brother of U.S. Senator John McCain

=== Libertarian primary ===
==== Candidates ====
===== Nominee =====
- Ron Crickenberger, national political director of the United States Libertarian Party and nominee for this seat in 2000

=== General election ===
==== Predictions ====
Source	Ranking	As of
Sabato's Crystal Ball	Safe D	November 4, 2002
New York Times	Safe D	October 14, 2002

==== Results ====
Virginia's 8th congressional district election, 2002
Party	Candidate	Votes	%
Democratic	Jim Moran (incumbent)	102,759	59.8
Republican	Scott Tate	64,121	37.3
Libertarian	Ron Crickenberger	4,558	2.7
Write-in		361	0.2
Majority		38,638	22.5
Total votes		171,799	100.0
Democratic hold			

== District 9 ==
2002 Virginia's 9th congressional district election
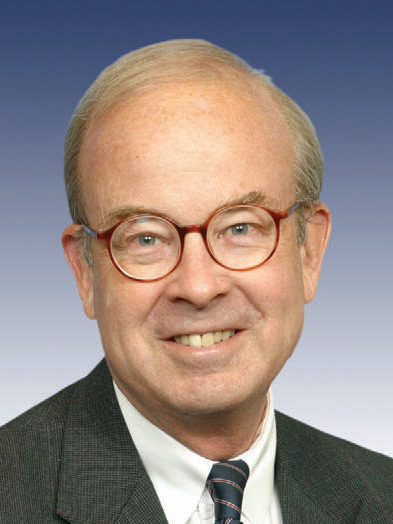

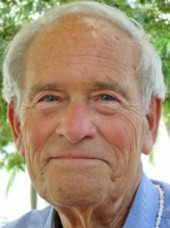
Candidate	Rick Boucher	Jay Katzen
Party	Democratic	Republican
Popular vote	100,075	52,076
Percentage	65.8%	34.2%
- County and independent city results Boucher: 50–60% 60–70% 70–80%
U.S. Representative before election
Rick Boucher
Democratic
Elected U.S. Representative
Rick Boucher
Democratic

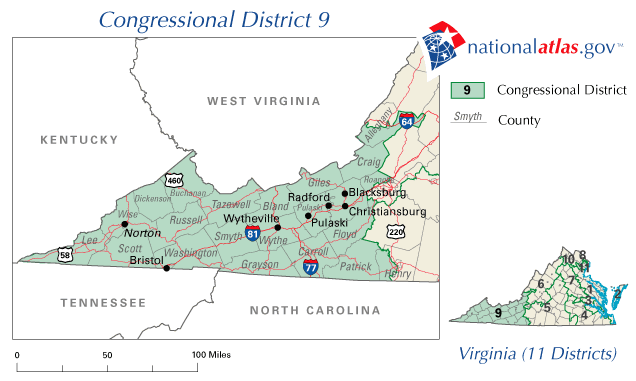

Incumbent Democrat Rick Boucher, who had represented the district since 1983, ran for re-election. He was re-elected with 69.8% of the vote in 2000.

=== Democratic primary ===
==== Candidates ====
===== Nominee =====
- Rick Boucher, incumbent U.S. Representative

=== Republican primary ===
==== Candidates ====
===== Nominee =====
- Jay Katzen, diplomat, former state delegate and nominee for Lieutenant Governor in 2001

=== General election ===
==== Predictions ====
Source	Ranking	As of
Sabato's Crystal Ball	Safe D	November 4, 2002
New York Times	Safe D	October 14, 2002

==== Results ====
Virginia's 9th congressional district election, 2002
Party	Candidate	Votes	%
Democratic	Rick Boucher (incumbent)	100,075	65.8
Republican	Jay Katzen	52,076	34.2
Write-in		32	0.0
Majority		47,999	31.5
Total votes		152,183	100.0
Democratic hold			

== District 10 ==
2002 Virginia's 10th congressional district election
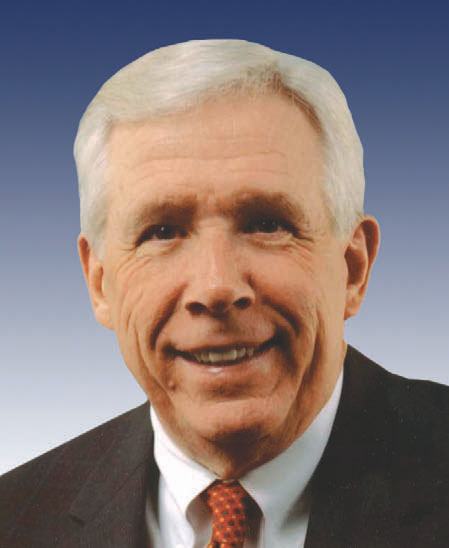

Candidate	Frank Wolf	John Stevens, Jr.
Party	Republican	Democratic
Popular vote	115,917	45,464
Percentage	71.7%	28.1%
- County and independent city results Wolf: 60–70% 70–80% 80–90%
U.S. Representative before election
Frank Wolf
Republican
Elected U.S. Representative
Frank Wolf
Republican

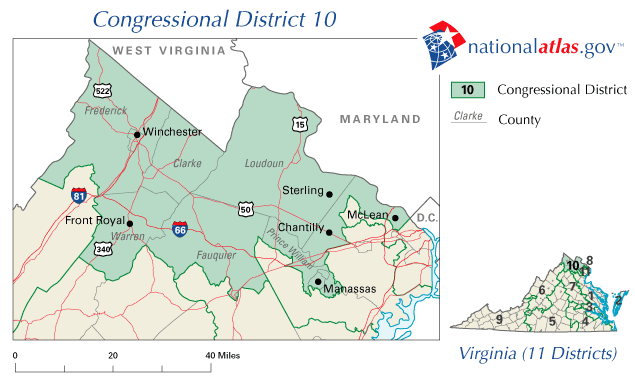

Incumbent Republican Frank Wolf, who had represented the district since 1981, ran for re-election. He was re-elected with 84.2% of the vote in 2000.

=== Republican primary ===
==== Candidates ====
===== Nominee =====
- Frank Wolf, incumbent U.S. Representative

=== Democratic primary ===
==== Candidates ====
===== Nominee =====
- John Stevens Jr., businessman

=== General election ===
==== Predictions ====
Source	Ranking	As of
Sabato's Crystal Ball	Safe R	November 4, 2002
New York Times	Safe R	October 14, 2002

==== Results ====
Virginia's 10th congressional district election, 2002
Party	Candidate	Votes	%
Republican	Frank Wolf (incumbent)	115,917	71.7
Democratic	John Stevens, Jr.	45,464	28.1
Write-in		234	0.1
Majority		70,453	43.6
Total votes		161,615	100.0
Republican hold			

== District 11 ==
2002 Virginia's 11th congressional district election
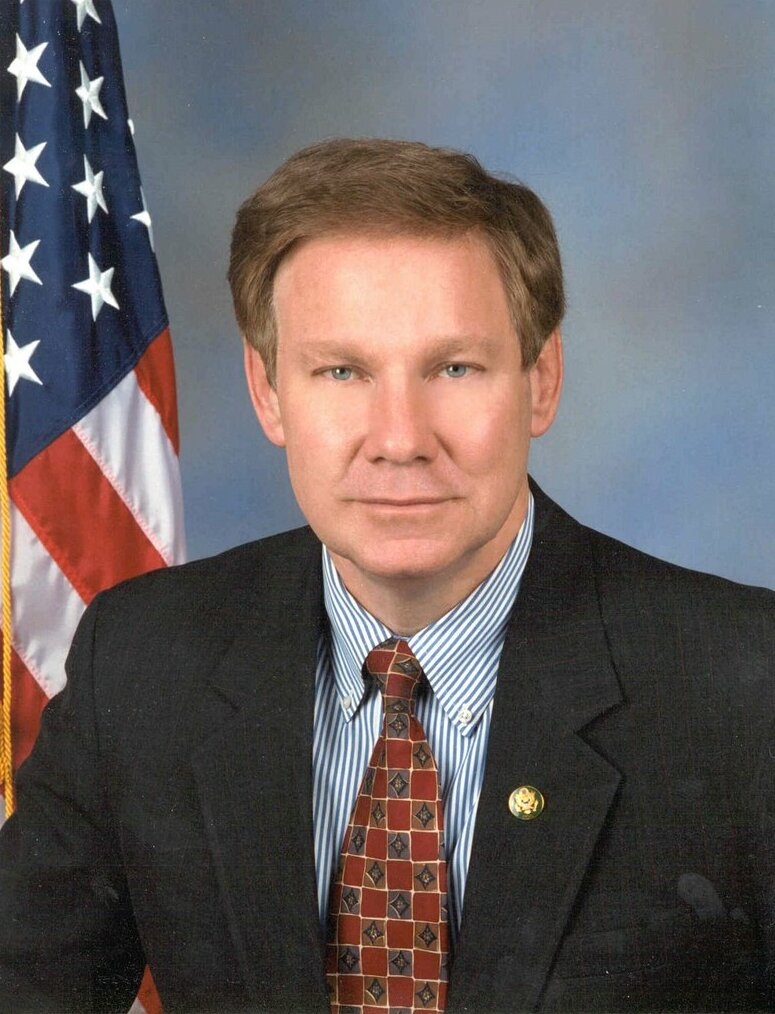

Candidate	Tom Davis	Frank Creel
Party	Republican	Constitution
Popular vote	135,379	26,892
Percentage	82.9%	16.5%
- County results Davis: 80–90%
U.S. Representative before election
Tom Davis
Republican
Elected U.S. Representative
Tom Davis
Republican

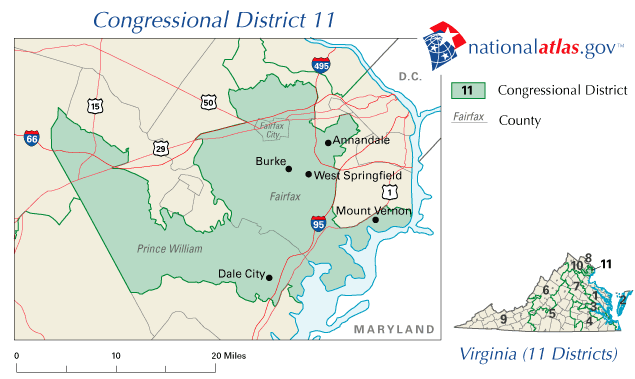

Incumbent Republican Tom Davis, who had represented the district since 1995, ran for re-election. He was re-elected with 61.9% of the vote in 2000.

=== Republican primary ===
==== Candidates ====
===== Nominee =====
- Tom Davis, incumbent U.S. Representative

=== Democratic primary ===
No Democrats filed to run.

=== Constitution primary ===
==== Candidates ====
===== Nominee =====
- Frank Creel, retired civil service employee

=== General election ===
==== Predictions ====
Source	Ranking	As of
Sabato's Crystal Ball	Safe R	November 4, 2002
New York Times	Safe R	October 14, 2002

==== Results ====
Virginia's 11th congressional district election, 2002
Party	Candidate	Votes	%
Republican	Tom Davis (incumbent)	135,379	82.9
Constitution	Frank Creel	26,892	16.5
Write-in		1,027	0.6
Majority		108,487	66.4
Total votes		163,298	100.0
Republican hold			
