= Libertarian Party of Virginia =

State affiliate of the Libertarian Party

- Founded: 1974 (first iteration); 2022 (second iteration)
- Headquarters: 14401 Nickel Ln., #203, Richmond, VA 23114
- Ideology: Libertarianism
- National affiliation: Libertarian Party
- Colors: a shade of blue, gold
- Virginia Senate: 0 / 40
- Virginia House of Delegates: 0 / 100
- U.S. Senate (Virginia): 0 / 2
- U.S. House of Representatives (Virginia): 0 / 11
- Other elected officials: 0 (June 2024)

Website
- LPVA.org

The Libertarian Party of Virginia (LPVA) is the Virginia affiliate of the Libertarian Party. The party was founded in 1974.

== Ballot laws ==
=== Ballot access laws ===
Virginia has one of the most restrictive ballot access laws in the United States.

According to the Code of Virginia subsection 24.2-101, without "major party" status for automatic ballot access in Virginia, the LPVA has had to gather petition signatures to get on the ballot. The requirement for statewide elections, such as the U.S. Senate, is 10,000 signatures, including at least 400 from each of Virginia's 11 congressional districts. However, after the Virginia Republican presidential primary in 2012, Virginia lawmakers reduced the 10,000 signature requirement for presidential candidates by half. Now, according to Code of Virginia § 24.2-543, a petition to put a third-party or independent candidate on the ballot for U.S. President "shall be signed by at least 5,000 qualified voters and include signatures of at least 200 qualified voters from each congressional district." Thus, this revision makes it easier for presidential candidates to obtain ballot access; yet, the law still remains as a barrier to entry for minor party candidates.

For the party to gain automatic ballot access as a major party, one of its nominated candidates must receive 10% of the vote in a statewide race. To obtain the signatures necessary to receive statewide ballot access in Virginia, it has been quoted to cost between $45,000 to $90,000. Should the LPVA meet the ten percent threshold, career journalist James Bacon noted: "Sparing the Libertarian Party the expense of petitioning to get its candidates on the ballot would allow it to husband its resources to help candidates campaign... That would be huge."

=== Ballot access litigation ===
The Libertarian Party of Virginia has, on multiple occasions, taken legal action over Virginia's ballot access laws.

==== Libertarian Party of Virginia v. Judd ====
In 2013, the ACLU supported the Libertarian Party of Virginia and contended that the Libertarians would suffer "irreparable harm" given Virginia's ballot access laws.

In Libertarian Party of Virginia vs. Judd, the LPVA won the case regarding state residency requirements for petition circulators per the United States Court of Appeals for the Fourth Circuit on May 29, 2013. It was the first time a minor party had won a constitutional election law case in the Fourth Circuit since 1989 and 1988. In response to the Fourth Circuit's ruling, the State of Virginia via former Attorney General Ken Cuccinelli as well as several other states, like Oklahoma, submitted petitions to the Supreme Court of the United States asking to reverse the Fourth Circuit's decision. On December 2, 2013, the petitions against the Fourth Circuit's ruling were denied by the Supreme Court, and so the Libertarian Party of Virginia won the case regarding state residency requirements for petition circulators.

==== Sarvis v. Judd ====
In July 2014, The Rutherford Institute supported the Libertarian Party of Virginia and alleged Virginia ballot laws favored "the election chances of Democrat and Republican candidates at the expense of Libertarian Party and independent candidates."

In Sarvis vs. Judd a lawsuit was filed on behalf of the Libertarian Party of Virginia, several Libertarian Party candidates and an independent (non-party) candidate for public office in the November 2014 general election. The lawsuit challenged the Virginia State Board of Elections and the laws which require minor-party candidates to gather signatures on petitions to achieve ballot access as well as the laws which require minor-party and independent candidates' names to be placed below those of major-party candidates on the ballot.

== Notable Virginia Libertarians ==
- Roger MacBride, the first presidential elector in U.S. history to cast a vote for a woman, and the presidential nominee for the Libertarian Party in the 1976 election
- Robert Sarvis, the LPVA's 2013 gubernatorial candidate whose performance was the best performance for a minor party gubernatorial candidate in the U.S. South in nearly 40 years

=== Office holders ===
The LPVA has and has had members elected and appointed to varying positions of government. These have included positions for: town councils; soil and water conservation committees; budget advisory committees; community leadership institutes; buildings, roads and grounds committees; and school boards.

== Elections ==
=== 1999 state elections ===
In 1999, Timothy Belton ran in the 65th district and got 22.8 percent of the vote. John Girardeau ran in the 72nd district and got 17.1 percent.

=== 2000 presidential election ===
In the 2000 presidential election, the Libertarian nominee was Harry Browne, who gathered the requisite signatures to appear on the ballot in the general election. Browne received 0.6% of the vote in Virginia. In the 8th Congressional district, Ron Crickenberger received 1.3% of the vote for Representative. In the 11th Congressional district, Robert K. McBride received 2.0% of the vote for Representative.

United States presidential election in Virginia, 2000
Party	Candidate	Running mate	Votes	Percentage	Electoral votes
Republican	George W. Bush	Dick Cheney	1,437,490	52.5%	13
Democratic	Al Gore	Joe Lieberman	1,217,290	44.4%	0
Green	Ralph Nader	Winona LaDuke	59,398	2.2%	0
Libertarian	Harry Browne	Art Olivier	15,198	0.6%	0
Reform	Pat Buchanan	Ezola Foster	5,455	0.2%	0
Constitution	Howard Phillips	Curtis Frazier	1,809	0.1%	0
Write-ins	Write-ins	-	2,807	0.1%	0
Totals			2,739,447	100%	13
Voter turnout					—

=== 2001 gubernatorial election ===
Bill Redpath ran for Governor against Mark Warner (D) and Mark Earley (R) receiving 0.8% of the vote. Gary Reams ran for Lieutenant Governor.

Virginia gubernatorial election, 2001
Party	Candidate	Votes	%	±%
Democratic	Mark Warner	984,177	52.2%	+9.6%
Republican	Mark Earley	887,234	47.0%	−8.8%
Libertarian	Bill Redpath	14,497	0.8%	
Write-ins		813	0%	
Majority		96,943	5.1%	−8.1%
Turnout		1,886,721		
Democratic gain from Republican		Swing		

House of Delegates

Bill Peabody ran in the 39th district and got 0.9% of the vote. Micah Gray ran in the 41st district and got 15.9% of the vote. Christine Austen ran in 47th district and got 2.8% of the vote. Jim Simpson ran in the 51st district and got 2.3% of the vote. John H. Girardeau III ran in the 65th district and got 2.0% of the vote. Robert Stermer ran in the 96th district and got 1.0% of the vote.

Also in 2001, ACLU lawyers represented four Libertarian candidates (Redpath, Reams, Belton, and Girardeau) seeking to be listed on the ballot as Libertarians rather than independents. Joining them as plaintiffs in their federal lawsuit were two Virginia voters, John Buckley and Shelley Tamres.

=== 2002 midterm election ===
Libertarian Ron Crickenberger ran as an independent in the 8th Congressional district, although he was referred to by the media, by the LPVA website, and by his own campaign website as a Libertarian candidate. He received 2.7% of the vote.

=== 2004 presidential election ===
In the 2004 presidential election, the Libertarian nominee was Michael Badnarik, who received 0.4% of the vote in Virginia.

United States presidential election in Virginia, 2004
Party	Candidate	Running mate	Votes	Percentage	Electoral votes
Republican	George W. Bush (inc.)	Dick Cheney	1,716,959	53.7%	13
Democratic	John Kerry	John Edwards	1,454,742	45.5%	0
Libertarian	Michael Badnarik	Richard Campagna	11,032	0.4%	0
Constitution	Michael Peroutka	Chuck Baldwin	10,161	0.3%	0
Independent (Write-in)	Ralph Nader (Write-in)	Peter Camejo	2,393	0.1%	0
Green (Write-in)	David Cobb (Write-in)	Pat LaMarche	104	0%	0
Write-ins		-	24	0%	0
Totals			3,195,415	100%	13
Voter turnout (voting age population)				57.2%	—

=== 2005 state election ===
House of Delegates

Donald Ferguson ran in the 36th district and got 20.1% of the vote. Scott McPherson ran in the 37th district and got 1.5% of the vote. Charles Eby, Jr. ran in the 67th district and got 2.4% of the vote. Matthew Martin ran in the 73rd district and got 27.1% of the vote.

=== 2006 midterm elections ===
Wilbur N. Wood III appeared on the ballot in Virginia's 10th congressional district, receiving 0.9% of the vote.

Virginia's 10th congressional district election, 2006
Party	Candidate	Votes	%
Republican	Frank Wolf (inc.)	138,213	57.3
Democratic	Judy Feder	98,769	41.0
Libertarian	Wilbur N. Wood III	2,107	0.9
Independent	Neeraj C. Nigam	1,851	0.8
Write-ins		194	nil
Total votes		241,134	100
Republican hold			

=== 2007 state elections ===
Senate of Virginia

Don Tabor ran in the 14th district and got 28.8% of the vote.

=== 2008 elections ===
In the 2008 presidential election, the Libertarian nominee was Bob Barr, who gathered the requisite signatures to appear on the ballot in the general election. Barr received 0.3% of the vote in Virginia. Bill Redpath was the party nominee for U.S. Senate, and he appeared on the ballot receiving 0.6% of the vote. In the 1st congressional district, Libertarian nominee Nathan Larson appeared on the ballot and received 1.5% of the vote. He was expelled from the party in 2017.

United States presidential election in Virginia, 2008
Party	Candidate	Running mate	Votes	Percentage	Electoral votes
Democratic	Barack Obama	Joe Biden	1,959,532	52.6%	13
Republican	John McCain	Sarah Palin	1,725,005	46.3%	0
Independent	Ralph Nader	Matt Gonzalez	11,483	0.31	0
Libertarian	Bob Barr	Wayne Allyn Root	11,067	0.3%	0
Constitution	Chuck Baldwin	Darrell Castle	7,474	0.2%	0
Green	Cynthia McKinney	Rosa Clemente	2,344	0.1%	0
Write-ins	Write-ins		6,355	0.2%	0
Totals			3,723,260	100%	13
Voter turnout (voting age population)					65.1%

=== 2009 state elections ===
Matt Cholko ran in the 39th district and got 3.2% of the vote.

=== 2010 midterm elections ===
Libertarian candidates appeared on the ballot in four U.S. House of Representatives elections in Virginia: James Quigley (3rd District), Stuart Bain (6th District), Bill Redpath (10th District), and David Dotson (11th District). Party candidates received a combined total of 23,681 votes (1.1%) statewide. (15,309 of those votes were from Bain, who received 9.2% in his district because there was no Democratic candidate running against Republican incumbent Bob Goodlatte.)

United States House of Representatives elections in Virginia, 2010
Party	Votes	Percentage	Seats before	Seats after	+/–
Republican	1,186,098	54.1%	5	8	+3
Democratic	911,116	41.6%	6	3	-3
Independents	42,002	1.9%	0	0	0
Libertarian	23,681	1.1%	0	0	0
Independent Greens	21,374	1.0%	0	0	0
Write-In	5,570	0.3%	0	0	0
Totals	2,189,841	100%	11	11	—

=== 2011 state elections ===
Senate of Virginia

Don Tabor ran in the 14th district and got 28.8% of the vote.

House of Delegates

Michael Kane ran in the 41st district and got 31.3% of the vote. Glenn McGuire ran in the 95th district and got 22.7% of the vote.

=== 2012 presidential election ===
Libertarian presidential nominee Gary Johnson received over 30,000 votes or approximately 0.8% of the vote in Virginia.

United States presidential election in Virginia, 2012
Party	Candidate	Running mate	Votes	Percentage	Electoral votes
Democratic	Barack Obama (incumbent)	Joe Biden	1,971,820	51.2%	13
Republican	Mitt Romney	Paul Ryan	1,822,522	47.3%	0
Libertarian	Gary Johnson	Jim Gray	31,216	0.8%	0
Constitution	Virgil Goode	Jim Clymer	13,058	0.3%	0
Green	Jill Stein	Cheri Honkala	8,627	0.2%	0
Write-ins	Write-ins		7,246	0.2%	0
Totals			3,854,489	100%	13

=== 2013 state elections ===
House of Delegates

Six candidates ran for various seats in the Virginia House of Delegates. Jonathan Parrish earned 22.3% in the 23rd district. Patrick Hagerty obtained 3.4% in the 33rd district. Laura Delhomme garnered 22.9% of the vote in the 47th district. Anthony Tellez had 4.2% for the 53rd district. Christopher Sullivan received 5.6% in the 55th district, and Dan Foster obtained 3.7% in the 78th district. In total, there were over 15,000 votes cast for Libertarian candidates running for the Virginia House of Delegates in 2013.

Gubernatorial

Robert Sarvis, the Libertarian gubernatorial nominee, became the fourth minor party nominee in forty years to get on the Virginia ballot. On election day, Sarvis obtained 146,084 votes, or approximately 6.5% of the total vote cast, a number nearly three times the size of McAuliffe's victory margin over Cuccinelli and nearly five times better than Libertarian presidential candidate Gary Johnson from the year before. Sarvis' performance was the best performance among any Libertarian running for Governor of Virginia, among the top three strongest among any Libertarian candidate running in a state gubernatorial election, and the best performance for a third party gubernatorial candidate in the U.S. South in nearly 40 years.

Virginia gubernatorial election, 2013
Party	Candidate	Votes	%	±%
Democratic	Terry McAuliffe	1,069,859	47.8%	+6.5%
Republican	Ken Cuccinelli	1,013,355	45.2%	−13.4%
Libertarian	Robert Sarvis	146,084	6.5%	+6.5%
Write-ins		11,091	0.5%	
Plurality		56,504	2.5%	−14.9%
Turnout		2,240,379	100%	
Democratic gain from Republican		Swing		

=== 2014 midterm elections ===
U.S. Senate

United States Senate election in Virginia, 2014
Party	Candidate	Votes	%	±%
Democratic	Mark Warner (inc.)	1,073,565	49.2%	−15.9%
Republican	Ed Gillespie	1,055,894	48.3%	+14.6%
Libertarian	Robert Sarvis	53,098	2.4%	+1.9%
Write-ins		1,769	0.1%	
Plurality		17,671	0.8%	-30.5%
Turnout		2,184,326		
Democratic hold		Swing		

U.S. House of Representatives

Candidates for the U.S. House:

1st District: Xavian Draper 2nd District: Allen Knapp 3rd District: Justin Upshaw 4th District: Bo Brown 5th District: Paul Jones 6th District: Will Hammer 7th District: James Carr 8th District: Jeffrey Carson 9th District: Matthew Edwards 10th District: Bill Redpath 11th District: Marc Harrold

For the first time in its history, the Libertarian Party of Virginia had a full slate of candidates for the U.S. Congress in Virginia. Collectively, the candidates submitted well over 30,000 signatures by the June 10th deadline. This would have been the first time any party other than the Democratic and Republican Parties ran a full slate for U.S. House in Virginia since 1916; however, Xavian Draper, Allen Knapp, Justin Upshaw, and Matthew Edwards did not submit enough valid signatures to qualify for a position on the ballot.

Therefore, seven candidates ran for various seats in Congress. Bo Brown earned 2.2% in the 4th district. Paul Jones had 2.1% in the 5th district. Will Hammer garnered 12.3% in the 6th district. James Carr obtained 2.1% in the 7th district. Jeffrey Carson received 2.2% in the 8th district. Bill Redpath had 1.5% in the 10th district, and Marc Harrold earned 1.7% in the 11th district. In total, there were over 47,000 votes cast for Libertarian candidates running for Congress in 2014.

United States House of Representatives elections in Virginia, 2014
Party	Votes	Percentage	Seats before	Seats after	+/–
Republican	1,143,692	53.6%	8	8	0
Democratic	845,845	39.6%	3	3	0
Libertarian	47,037	2.2%	0	0	-
Independent Greens	30,661	1.4%	0	0	-
Green	1,739	0.1%	0	0	-
Independents/Write-In	66,190	3.1%	0	0	-
Totals	2,135,164	100%	11	11	—

=== 2015 state elections ===
House of Delegates

Four candidates ran for various seats in the Virginia House of Delegates. Will Hammer earned 23.9% in the 20th district. Mark Anderson had 3.6% in the 33rd district. Andy Bakker garnered 4.5% in the 46th district, and Brian Suojanen obtained 2.1% in the 87th district. In total, there were nearly 5,000 votes cast for Libertarian candidates running for the Virginia House of Delegates.

Senate of Virginia

Carl Loser ran for the Senate of Virginia in the 10th district. Loser had 1.0% of the vote, or 527 votes.

=== 2016 presidential election ===
Gary Johnson got 3.0% of the vote.

United States presidential election in Virginia, 2016
Party	Candidate	Running mate	Votes	Percentage	Electoral votes
Democratic	Hillary Clinton	Tim Kaine	1,981,473	49.7%	13
Republican	Donald Trump	Mike Pence	1,769,443	44.4%	0
Libertarian	Gary Johnson	William Weld	118,274	3.0%	0
Independent	Evan McMullin	Mindy Finn	54,054	1.4%	0
Green	Jill Stein	Ajamu Baraka	27,638	0.7%	0
Independent (Write-in)	-	-	33,749	0.9%	0
Totals			3,984,631	100%	13
Voter turnout (voting age population)					71.3%
Source: Virginia Department of Elections

=== 2017 state elections ===
Candidates running in 2017 include Will Hammer in the 20th district, Michael Millner in the 22nd district; and Terry Hurst in the 89th district.

Virginia gubernatorial election, 2017
Party	Candidate	Votes	%	±%
Democratic	Ralph Northam	1,409,175	53.9%	+6.2%
Republican	Ed Gillespie	1,175,731	45.0%	−0.3%
Libertarian	Cliff Hyra	27,987	1.1%	−5.5%
Write-ins		1,389	0.1%	−0.4%
Majority		233,444	8.9%	+6.4%
Turnout		2,614,282		

=== 2018 midterm election ===
Matt Waters was the Libertarian nominee for the U.S. Senate. He received 1.84% of the vote.

United States Senate election in Virginia, 2018
Party	Candidate	Votes	%	±%
Democratic	Tim Kaine (incumbent)	1,910,370	57.00%	+4.17%
Republican	Corey Stewart	1,374,313	41.01%	−5.91%
Libertarian	Matt Waters	61,565	1.84%	N/A
Write-in		5,125	0.15%	N/A
Total votes		3,351,373	100.00%	N/A

=== 2020 presidential election ===
Libertarian presidential nominee Jo Jorgensen received 1.45% of the vote in Virginia.

2020 United States presidential election in Virginia
Party	Candidate	Votes	%	±%
Democratic	Joe Biden Kamala Harris	2,413,568	54.11%	+4.38%
Republican	Donald Trump Mike Pence	1,962,430	44.00%	−0.41%
Libertarian	Jo Jorgensen Spike Cohen	64,761	1.45%	−1.52%
Write-in		19,765	0.44%	-0.41%
Total votes		4,460,524	100.00%	

== See also ==
- Libertarian Party (United States)
- Libertarianism.org
- Institute for Justice
- Institute for Humane Studies
- Campaign for Liberty
- Young Americans for Liberty
- Mercatus Center
- Democratic Party of Virginia
- Green Party of Virginia
- Republican Party of Virginia
- List of Libertarian Party of Virginia statewide and federal candidates
