= Virginia's 9th House of Delegates district =

Virginia legislative district

Virginia's 9th State House of Delegates district
- District map from the 2023 election
Delegate
Karrie Delaney; D–Chantilly
since January 10, 2024
- Demographics: 42% White; 6% Black; 16% Hispanic; 31% Asian; 1% Other; 4% Multiracial
- Population (2023) • Voting age: 87,051; 18
- Registered voters (2024): 60,476

Virginia's 9th House of Delegates district is one of 100 seats in the Virginia House of Delegates, the lower house of the state's bicameral legislature. District 9 consists parts of Fairfax County. It has been represented by Democrat Karrie Delaney since 2024.

In 2021, prior to redistricting, Williams won the Republican nomination defeating incumbent Charles Poindexter . In the November 2021 general election, he faced Democrat Bridgette Craighead.

== District officeholders ==
Years	Delegate	Party	Electoral history
– January 9, 2008	Allen Dudley	Republican	Retired
January 9, 2008 – January 12, 2022	Charles Poindexter	Republican	Lost Renomination Bid
January 12, 2022 – January 10, 2024	Wren Williams	Republican	First elected in 2021 (redistricted to the 47th District)
January 10, 2024 – present	Karrie Delaney	Democratic	Redistricted from the 67th District

== Electoral history ==
2015 General Election, Virginia 9th House of Delegates
Party	Candidate	Votes	%	±%
Republican	Charles Poindexter	16,086	100.00%	n/a
Total votes		16,086	100.00%	n/a

2016 General Election, Presidential
Party	Candidate	Votes	%	±%
Republican	Donald Trump	23,983	71.05%	n/a
Democratic	Hillary Clinton	8,682	25.72%	n/a
Libertarian	Gary Johnson	639	1.89%	n/a
Independent	Evan McMullin	304	0.90%	n/a
Green	Jill Stein	145	0.43%	n/a
Total votes		33,753	100.00%	n/a
