= Dudley Allen =

Dudley Allen may refer to:

- Dudley Peter Allen (1852–1915), American surgeon, writer and art patron
- T. Dudley Allen (1829–1924), American architect
- Dudley Allen (racehorse trainer), wins included the 1891 Kentucky Derby

== See also ==
- Allen Dudley, American politician
