= Chuck Caputo =

American politician

Member of the Virginia House of Delegates from the 67th district
- In office January 11, 2006 – January 13, 2010
- Preceded by: Gary Reese
- Succeeded by: James LeMunyon

Personal details
- Born: July 17, 1938 (age 88) New York City
- Party: Democratic
- Spouse: Barbara Lee Maguire
- Children: Charles, Kathleen, Christopher
- Education: City College of New York, George Washington University
- Occupation: Telecommunications engineer
- Committees: Counties, Cities and Towns; Finance

Carmin Charles "Chuck" Caputo (born July 17, 1938, in New York City) is an American politician. A Democrat, he was elected to the Virginia House of Delegates in November 2005. He represented the 67th district, made up of parts of Fairfax and Loudoun Counties. He was defeated for reelection on November 3, 2009 by James LeMunyon. In 2014, Virginia Governor Terry McAuliffe announced that he was appointing Caputo to the board of the Metropolitan Washington Airports Authority.

== Politics ==
Caputo was first elected in 2005 after beating Republican Chris Craddock, who had defeated incumbent Gary Reese in the June GOP primary earlier that year, and Libertarian Charles Eby. He won reelection in 2007 against Republican Marc Cadin but lost in 2009 against Jim LeMunyon. His grandson, Brian, was a page and they often drove home together on Fridays.

He sat on the Finance and Counties, Cities and Towns Committees. He also serves on the Northern Virginia Community College Board of Trustees, of which he is a past vice-chair. Caputo was formerly Vice-Chair of the Fairfax County School Board. He has served as Parent Teacher Association President at the Thomas Jefferson High School for Science and Technology.

== Personal life ==
Caputo graduated from City College of New York in 1961, and earned a master's degree from George Washington University in 1975. In the past, Caputo worked for the Defense Information Systems Agency and the Federal Aviation Administration. He has been married to Barbara Caputo for over 40 years.
