= Charles Poindexter =

American politician (1942–2026)

Charles D. Poindexter

Member of the Virginia House of Delegates from the 9th district
- In office January 9, 2008 – January 12, 2022
- Preceded by: Allen Dudley
- Succeeded by: Wren Williams

Personal details
- Born: February 27, 1942 Roanoke, Virginia, U.S.
- Died: February 4, 2026 (aged 83)
- Party: Republican
- Spouse(s): Mary (1962–1986); Diane (1987); Janet (1989–2026)
- Children: 6
- Education: Lynchburg College; George Washington University
- Occupation: Farmer
- Committees: Agriculture, Chesapeake and Natural Resources; Appropriations; Counties, Cities and Towns
- Website: votepoindexter.com

Charles Douglas Poindexter (February 27, 1942 – February 4, 2026) was an American politician who was a Republican member of the Virginia House of Delegates from 2008 to 2022, representing the 9th district, made up of Patrick County plus parts of Franklin and Henry Counties. He was defeated in the 2021 Republican primary by Wren Williams. Poindexter died on February 4, 2026, at the age of 83.

== Electoral history ==
Date	Election	Candidate	Party	Votes	%
Virginia House of Delegates, 9th district
November 6, 2007	General	Charles D. Poindexter	Republican	10,102	46.43
November 6, 2007	General	Eric H. Ferguson	Democratic	9,553	43.91
November 6, 2007	General	Jerry W. Boothe	Independent	2,080	9.56
November 6, 2007	General	Write Ins		20	0.09
November 6, 2007	General	Allen Dudley retired; seat stayed Republican			
November 3, 2009	General	Charles D. Poindexter	Republican	16,534	79.03
November 3, 2009	General	Sherman David Witcher	Independent Green	4,332	20.70
November 3, 2009	General	Write Ins		55	0.26
November 8, 2011	General	Charles D. Poindexter	Republican	13,189	52.61
November 8, 2011	General	Ward L. Armstrong	Democratic	11,840	47.23
November 8, 2011	General	Write Ins		37	0.14
November 5, 2013	General	Charles Douglas Poindexter	Republican	17,216	98.1
November 5, 2013	General	Write Ins		338	1.9
November 3, 2015	General	Charles Douglas Poindexter	Republican	16,086	97.5
November 3, 2015	General	Write Ins		415	2.5
November 7, 2017	General	Charles Douglas Poindexter	Republican	16,413	70.3
November 7, 2017	General	Stephanie Christine Cook	Democratic	6,916	29.6
November 7, 2017	General	Write Ins		28	0.1
November 3, 2019	General	Charles Douglas Poindexter	Republican	19,040	96.3
November 3, 2019	General	Write Ins		729	3.7
