= Gary Reese =

Virginia politician (born 1945)

Member of the Virginia House of Delegates from the 67th district
- In office January 9, 2002 – January 11, 2006
- Preceded by: Roger McClure
- Succeeded by: Chuck Caputo

Personal details
- Born: 1945 (age 80–81) San Antonio, Texas, U.S.
- Party: Republican
- Spouse: Carol Sue Gwaltney
- Children: 2
- Education: College of William & Mary (BA); University of Virginia (JD)
- Profession: Attorney
- Committees: Counties Cities and Towns; Courts of Justice; Education

Gary Alan Reese (born 1945) is an American politician and lawyer who served as a Republican member of the Virginia House of Delegates for the 67th district from 2002 to 2006. The district included portions of western Fairfax County and a small part of eastern Loudoun County, and was situated in the Washington, D.C. suburbs of Northern Virginia.

A moderate Republican, he was one of 34 Republican delegates who backed Virginia Governor Mark Warner's 2004 budget which included tax increases to balance the commonwealth's budget. In 2005, he drew the attention of anti-tax activists, who spent massively for his opponent in the Republican primary, Chris Craddock. Craddock defeated Reese in the primary. However, Craddock went on to lose the general election to Democrat Chuck Caputo.

Prior to his election to the House of Delegates, Reese served as the Sully District School Board member on the Fairfax County School Board from 1992 until 2001.

== Electoral history ==
Date	Election	Candidate	Party	Votes	%
Virginia House of Delegates, 67th district
November 6, 2001	General	G. A. Reese	Republican	10,987	60.6
November 6, 2001	General	G.G. Schoenborn	Democratic	7,131	39.3
November 6, 2001	General	Write Ins		19	0
November 4, 2003	General	G. A. Reese (incumbent)	Republican	9,724	98.0
November 4, 2003	General	Write-ins		198	2.0
June 14, 2005	Primary	G. A. Reese (incumbent)	Republican	1,349	34.0
June 14, 2005	Primary	C. S. Craddock	Republican	2,616	66.0
