= Allen Dudley =

American politician from Virginia (born 1947)

Member of the Virginia House of Delegates from the 9th district
- In office January 12, 1994 – January 9, 2008
- Preceded by: Willard R. Finney
- Succeeded by: Charles Poindexter

Personal details
- Born: Allen Wayne Dudley; 1947 (age 78–79) Rocky Mount, Virginia, U.S.
- Party: Republican
- Spouse: Virginia Ann Crigger
- Education: Ferrum College (AA); East Tennessee State University (BS)
- Occupation: Banker; politician

Allen Wayne Dudley (born 1947) is an American Republican politician from Virginia. He was a member of the Virginia House of Delegates for the 9th district from 1994 to 2007.
