= Wren Williams =

American politician from Virginia

Wren M. Williams
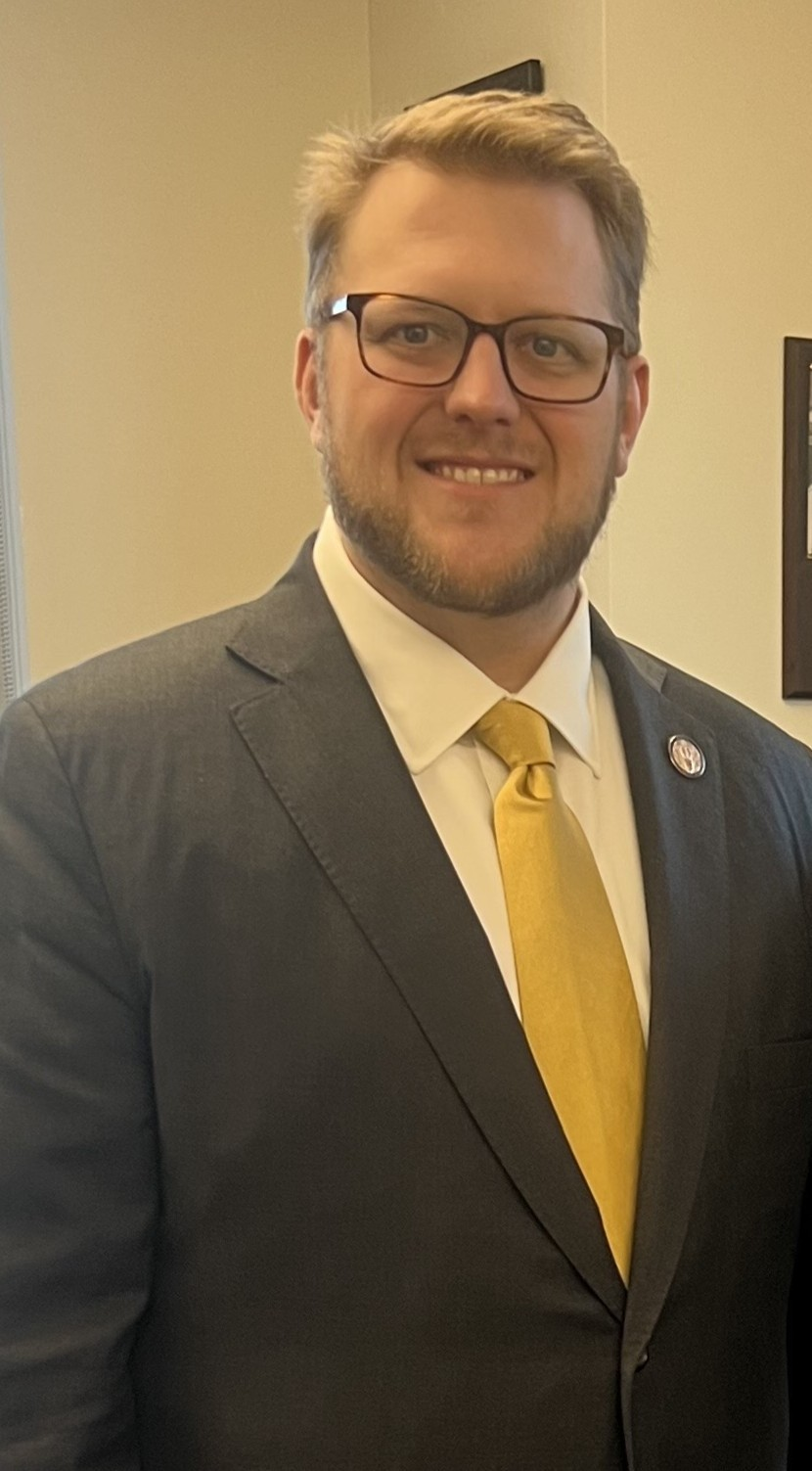
- Williams in 2025

Member of the Virginia House of Delegates
- Incumbent
- Assumed office January 12, 2022
- Preceded by: Charles Poindexter
- Constituency: 9th district (2022–2024); 47th district (2024–present)

Personal details
- Born: January 12, 1989 (age 37) Stuart, Virginia, U.S.
- Party: Republican
- Spouse: Britt S. Williams
- Children: 3
- Education: Hampden-Sydney College; Cumberland School of Law
- Occupation: Attorney
- Committees: Courts of Justice; Labor and Commerce; Transportation
- Website: WrenWilliamsVA.com

Wren Montgomery Williams is an American businessman, attorney, and politician serving as delegate for the 47th district of the Virginia House of Delegates. Williams previously represented the 9th district until the 2021 redistricting.

Williams, a Republican, defeated seven-term incumbent Charles Poindexter in the Republican primary, and Democratic nominee, activist Bridgette Craighead, in the 2021 Virginia House of Delegates election. In 2022, Williams proposed a bill (House Bill number 781) that included a requirement that Virginia public schools must teach certain aspects of American history in an effort to eliminate Critical Race Theory being taught in schools. Wren Williams attended Hampden–Sydney College and Samford University's Cumberland School of Law.

On September 22, 2022, Williams was accused by fellow Republican state delegate Marie March of assault after a party fundraising event. March alleges that Williams intentionally shoved her, while Williams claimed that he accidentally bumped into her. Williams was formally charged with assault, but was found not guilty in court. He alleges that March's accusations were motivated by redistricting in which both delegates were merged into the same House district for the 2023 election.

In 2025, Williams defeated Democrat Yvonne Rorrer in the 2025 Virginia House of Delegates election.

== Electoral history ==
| Date | Election | Candidate | Party | Votes | % |
Virginia House of Delegates, 9th district
| June 8, 2021 | Primary | Charles D. Poindexter | Republican | 2,498 | 37.22 |
| June 8, 2021 | Primary | Wren Williams | Republican | 4,213 | 62.78 |
| November 2, 2021 | General | Bridgette N. Craighead | Democratic | 10,090 | 23.09 |
| November 2, 2021 | General | Wren Williams | Republican | 23,926 | 76.62 |
| November 2, 2021 | General | Write Ins | | 89 | 0.29 |
Virginia House of Delegates, 47th district
| June 20, 2023 | Primary | Marie March | Republican | 3,289 | 33.11 |
| June 20, 2023 | Primary | Wren Williams | Republican | 6,645 | 66.89 |
| November 7, 2023 | General | Jacob C. Frogel | Independent | 617 | 2.67 |
| November 7, 2023 | General | Patricia L. Quesenberry | Democratic | 5,149 | 22.24 |
| November 7, 2023 | General | Wren Williams | Republican | 17,268 | 74.60 |
| November 7, 2023 | General | Write Ins | | 115 | 0.50 |
| November 4, 2025 | General | Yvonne M. Rorrer | Democratic | 8,209 | 25.46 |
| November 4, 2025 | General | Wren Williams | Republican | 23,912 | 74.17 |
| November 4, 2025 | General | Write Ins | | 119 | 0.37 |

Virginia House of Delegates
| Preceded by Charles Poindexter | Member of the Virginia House of Delegates from the 9th district 2022–2024 | Succeeded by Karrie Delaney |
| Preceded by Patrick Hope | Member of the Virginia House of Delegates from the 47th district 2024–Present | Incumbent |
