= James LeMunyon =

American entrepreneur (born 1959)

Jim LeMunyon

Member of the Virginia House of Delegates from the 67th district
- In office January 13, 2010 – January 10, 2018
- Preceded by: Chuck Caputo
- Succeeded by: Karrie Delaney

Personal details
- Born: March 12, 1959 (age 67) Elizabeth, New Jersey, U.S.
- Party: Republican
- Education: Valparaiso University; University of Wisconsin–Madison
- Profession: Businessman
- Committees: Transportation; Education; General Laws

James Mark "Jim" LeMunyon (/lɛˈmʌnjən/; born March 12, 1959) is an American politician and entrepreneur who served as a Republican member of the Virginia House of Delegates for the 67th district from 2010 to 2018. The district included portions of Fairfax and Loudoun counties, situated in the Washington, D.C. suburbs of Northern Virginia.

== Early life, education, career ==
LeMunyon was born in Elizabeth, New Jersey and grew up in Linwood. He received a B.S. degree in physics and mathematics from Valparaiso University in 1981, and an M.S. in meteorology from the University of Wisconsin–Madison in 1987. In between, he was chief of staff to Republican United States Representative Ed Zschau of California.

LeMunyon was Deputy Assistant Secretary of Commerce for Export Administration in the administration of president George H.W. Bush from 1989–1993. Since then he was an executive at two semiconductor technology companies: Sterling Semiconductor, a maker of silicon carbide semiconductors which he co-founded and which was acquired by Dow Corning and then SK Siltron; and HexaTech, a maker of aluminum nitride semiconductors. He now works with Booz Allen Hamilton.

In the 1990s, LeMunyon was an adjunct faculty member in the international transactions graduate program at George Mason University.

In the Virginia House of Delegates, LeMunyon served on the House committees on Counties, Cities and Towns (2010–2014), Education (2010–2018), General Laws (2012–2018), Transportation (2014–2018), and Science and Technology (2010–2012).

LeMunyon was regarded as an expert on transportation and education issues, and chaired the House Subcommittee on Government Procurement and the Freedom of Information Act. He also chaired the Freedom of Information Act Advisory Council, and served on the Northern Virginia Transportation Commission. LeMunyon was also known as one of the most productive and bipartisan members of the Virginia General Assembly, having authored more than 70 laws during his eight years in the House of Delegates. In addition to transportation and education policy, LeMunyon authored legislation requiring legislators' voting records be easily obtained online, substantial revisions to the Virginia Freedom of Information Act to reverse a Virginia Supreme Court decision, and extending the statute of limitation in cases of sexual abuse.

During his last term LeMunyon sponsored more bills (32) signed into law by then Governor Terry McAuliffe (a member of the opposite party) than any other member of the Virginia House or Senate. All 32 bills passed with bipartisan majorities. Reflecting the political divisions in his district, LeMunyon's politics have been described as an eclectic mix of positions from the left and right. For example, he voted in favor of re-affirming Jefferson's Virginia Statute for Religious Liberty; coal tax credits; education savings accounts; and closing the gun show loophole. He also favors allowing local governments to remove Confederate statues, supports non-partisan redistricting, and a convention of the states to propose an amendment to the U.S. Constitution to halt runaway federal debt.

== Electoral history ==
LeMunyon served four two year terms. Karrie Delaney defeated 67th House district incumbent Jim LeMunyon in the November 2017 election largely due to an anti-Trump backlash against Virginia's suburban Republican legislators in the Virginia House of Delegates elections.

| Date | Election | Candidate | Party | Votes | % |
Virginia House of Delegates, 67th district
| November 3, 2009 | General | James M. "Jim" LeMunyon | Republican | 10,857 | 52.67 |
| November 3, 2009 | General | Chuck Caputo | Democratic | 9,743 | 47.25 |
| November 3, 2009 | General | Write Ins | | 20 | 0.09 |
| November 3, 2009 | General | Incumbent lost; seat switched from Democratic to Republican | | | |
| November 8, 2011 | General | James M. "Jim" LeMunyon | Republican | 9,172 | 59.12 |
| November 8, 2011 | General | Eric E. Clingan | Democratic | 6,320 | 40.74 |
| November 8, 2011 | General | Write Ins | | 20 | 0.12 |
| November 5, 2013 | General | James M. "Jim" LeMunyon | Republican | 12,787 | 54.5 |
| November 5, 2013 | General | Hung Nguyen | Democratic | 10,642 | 45.3 |
| November 5, 2013 | General | Write Ins | | 44 | 0.2 |
| November 3, 2015 | General | James M. "Jim" LeMunyon | Republican | 11,231 | 94.93 |
| November 3, 2015 | General | Write Ins | | 600 | 5.07 |
