= 2020 United States presidential election in Virginia =

- November 3, 2020
- Turnout: 75.07% (▲2.97 pp)

Nominee	Joe Biden	Donald Trump
Party	Democratic	Republican
Home state	Delaware	Florida
Running mate	Kamala Harris	Mike Pence
Electoral vote	13	0
Popular vote	2,413,568	1,962,430
Percentage	54.11%	44.00%

Biden
40–50%
50–60%
60–70%
70–80%
80–90%
90–100%
Trump
40–50%
50–60%
60–70%
70–80%
80–90%
90–100%
Tie/No data
President before election
Donald Trump
Republican
Elected President
Joe Biden
Democratic

The 2020 United States presidential election in Virginia was held on Tuesday, November 3, 2020, as part of the 2020 United States presidential election in which all 50 states plus the District of Columbia participated. Virginia voters chose electors to represent them in the Electoral College via a popular vote, pitting the Republican Party's nominee, incumbent President Donald Trump, and running mate Vice President Mike Pence against Democratic Party nominee, former Vice President Joe Biden, and his running mate California Senator Kamala Harris. Virginia has 13 electoral votes in the Electoral College.

Prior to the election, most news organizations considered this a state Biden would win, or a likely blue state. On the day of the election, Biden won Virginia with 54.11% of the vote, and by a margin of 10.1%, the best performance for a Democratic presidential candidate since Franklin D. Roosevelt in 1944. Trump became the first Republican incumbent to consecutively lose Virginia since William Howard Taft and Biden became the first Democratic nominee to win Chesterfield County and Lynchburg City since 1948, Virginia Beach City since 1964, James City County since 1968, and Stafford County since 1976. He also flipped Chesapeake City back to the Democratic Party. Trump flipped no counties or independent cities in the state. Nevertheless, Biden became the first Democrat since 1960 to win without Westmoreland County, a notable bellwether. He was the first Democrat to ever win without Caroline County, Nelson County, or Covington.

The rapid growth of Northern Virginia as well as sliding suburban support for Republicans allowed Biden to win the once-key battleground state without actively campaigning in it. Biden won Henrico County, Loudoun County, Prince William County, and Fairfax County with 63.7%, 61.5%, 63.6%, and 69.9%, respectively; all four were former suburban bastions of the Republican Party in Virginia, the first outside Richmond and the others in Northern Virginia. All four had voted Republican in every election from 1968 through 2000. In Arlington County, a closer DC-area suburban county that had turned Democratic several decades earlier, Biden won with 80.6% of the vote, becoming the first nominee of either party in more than a century to do so. Biden's combined margin in Fairfax, Prince William, Loudoun, and Arlington Counties was greater than his statewide margin of victory. Crucially for his performance in Northern Virginia, Biden carried government workers by 18%.

== Primary elections ==
=== Canceled Republican primary ===
The Virginia Republican Party is one of several state GOP parties that have officially canceled their respective primaries and caucuses. Donald Trump's re-election campaign and GOP officials have cited the fact that Republicans canceled several state primaries when George H. W. Bush and George W. Bush sought a second term in 1992 and 2004, respectively; and Democrats scrapped some of their primaries when Bill Clinton and Barack Obama were seeking reelection in 1996 and 2012, respectively. At the Virginia State Republican Convention, originally scheduled for May 2020 but postponed to August 15, 2020, the state party will formally bind all 48 of its national pledged delegates to Trump.

=== Democratic primary ===
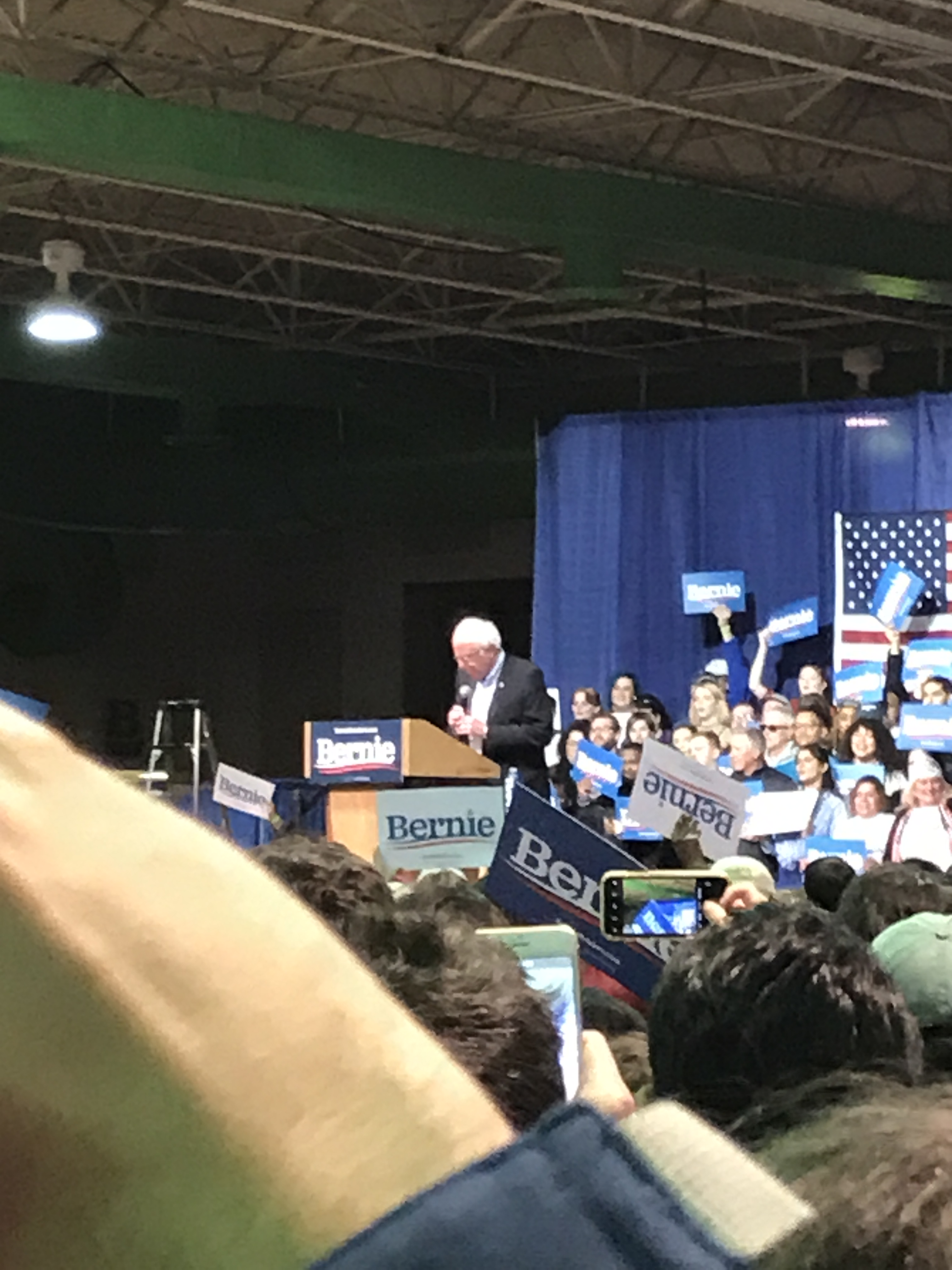
Sanders at a rally in Richmond on February 27, 2020

The Virginia Democratic primary took place on March 3, 2020, as part of the "Super Tuesday" suite of elections.

Joe Biden, Elizabeth Warren, and Bernie Sanders were among the major declared candidates.

Popular vote share by county
Biden—30–40%
Biden—40–50%
Biden—50–60%
Biden—60–70%
Biden—70–80%
Sanders—30–40%
Sanders—40–50%

Popular vote share by congressional district
Biden—40–50%
Biden—50–60%

2020 Virginia Democratic presidential primary (Note: The "2020 March Democratic Presidential Primary" website published by the Virginia Department of Elections does not include the write-in votes. This article includes them.)
Candidate	Votes	%	Delegates
Joe Biden	705,501	53.30	67
Bernie Sanders	306,388	23.15	31
Elizabeth Warren	142,546	10.77	1
Michael Bloomberg	128,030	9.67	
Tulsi Gabbard	11,288	0.85	
Pete Buttigieg (withdrawn) (Note: Candidate withdrew during absentee voting, shortly before the primary.)	11,199	0.85	
Amy Klobuchar (withdrawn)	8,414	0.64	
Andrew Yang (withdrawn) (Note: Candidate withdrew following the New Hampshire primary, when absentee voting had already begun.)	3,361	0.25	
Cory Booker (withdrawn)	1,910	0.14	
Tom Steyer (withdrawn)	1,472	0.11	
Michael Bennet (withdrawn)	1,437	0.11	
Marianne Williamson (withdrawn)	902	0.07	
Julian Castro (withdrawn)	691	0.05	
Deval Patrick (withdrawn)	370	0.03	
Write-in votes	184	0.01	
Total	1,323,693	100%	99

=== Green primary ===
The Green Party of Virginia conducted an online ranked choice primary from April 20 to April 26, 2020.

2020 Green Party of Virginia primary
Candidate	Round 1		Round 2		Round 3		Round 4	
Candidate	Votes	%	Votes	%	Votes	%	Votes	%
Howie Hawkins	42	62.7%	42	62.7%	43	64.2%	44	65.7%
Dario Hunter	17	25.4%	18	26.9%	21	31.3%	23	34.3%
Kent Mesplay	3	4.5%	3	4.5%	3	4.5%	Eliminated	
Sedinam Moyowasiza-Curry	2	3.0%	2	3.0%	Eliminated			
Jill Stein (write-in)	2	3.0%	Eliminated					
Jesse Ventura (write-in)	1	1.5%	Eliminated					
Total votes							67	100.0%

== General election ==
=== Predictions ===
Source	Ranking	As of
The Cook Political Report	Likely D	November 3, 2020
Inside Elections	Solid D	November 3, 2020
Sabato's Crystal Ball	Likely D	November 3, 2020
Politico	Likely D	November 3, 2020
RCP	Lean D	November 3, 2020
Niskanen	Safe D	November 3, 2020
CNN	Solid D	November 3, 2020
The Economist	Likely D	November 3, 2020
CBS News	Likely D	November 3, 2020
270towin	Likely D	November 3, 2020
ABC News	Solid D	November 3, 2020
NPR	Likely D	September 16, 2020
NBC News	Likely D	November 3, 2020
538	Solid D	November 3, 2020

=== Polling ===
View source data.

Aggregate polls

Source of poll aggregation	Dates administered	Dates updated	Joe Biden Democratic	Donald Trump Republican	Other/ Undecided (Note: Calculated by taking the difference of 100% and all other candidates combined.)	Margin
270 to Win	October 15–31, 2020	November 3, 2020	52.8%	41.0%	6.2%	Biden +11.8
FiveThirtyEight	until November 2, 2020	November 3, 2020	53.7%	41.9%	4.4%	Biden +11.8
Average			53.1%	41.5%	5.3%	Biden +11.8

Polls

Poll source	Date(s) administered	Sample size (Note: Key: A – all adults RV – registered voters LV – likely voters V – unclear)	Margin of error	Donald Trump Republican	Joe Biden Democratic	Jo Jorgensen Libertarian	Howie Hawkins Green	Other	Undecided
SurveyMonkey/Axios	Oct 20 – Nov 2, 2020	4,550 (LV)	± 2%	41% (Note: Overlapping sample with the previous SurveyMonkey/Axios poll, but more information available regarding sample size)	57%	-	-	–	–
Swayable	Oct 27 – Nov 1, 2020	467 (LV)	± 6.4%	39%	59%	2%	1%	–	–
Data for Progress	Oct 27 – Nov 1, 2020	690 (LV)	± 3.7%	43%	54%	1%	0%	1% (Note: "Other candidate or write-in" with 1%)	–
Roanoke College	Oct 23–29, 2020	802 (LV)	± 3.5%	42%	53%	2%	-	1%	2%
SurveyMonkey/Axios	Oct 1–28, 2020	7,663 (LV)	–	43%	55%	-	-	–	–
Christopher Newport University	Oct 15–27, 2020	908 (LV)	± 3.4%	41%	53%	-	-	2% (Note: "Someone else" with 2%)	4%
Swayable	Oct 23–26, 2020	351 (LV)	± 5.2%	44%	55%	1%	-	–	–
Virginia Commonwealth University	Oct 13–22, 2020	709 (LV)	± 4.93%	39%	51%	-	-	2% (Note: "Third party candidate" with 2%)	8% (Note: Includes "refused")
Schar School/Washington Post	Oct 13–19, 2020	908 (LV)	± 4%	41%	52%	3%	-	0% (Note: "Other", "None of these" and would not vote with 0%)	4%
Civiqs/Daily Kos	Oct 11–14, 2020	1,231 (LV)	± 3.1%	42%	55%	-	-	3% (Note: "Someone else" with 3%)	1%
Reconnect Research/Roanoke College	Sep 30 – Oct 12, 2020	602 (LV)	–	39% (Note: With voters who lean towards a given candidate)	54%	4%	-	-	4%
Survey Monkey/Tableau	Sep 15 – Oct 12, 2020	4,248 (LV)	–	43%	55%	-	-	–	2%
Cygnal/Gade for Virginia (Note: Poll conducted by Daniel Gade's campaign)	Oct 9–11, 2020	607 (LV)	–	42%	51%	-	-	–	–
SurveyMonkey/Axios	Sep 1–30, 2020	2,882 (LV)	–	42%	56%	-	-	–	2%
Cygnal/Gade for Virginia	Sep 22–25, 2020	600 (LV)	–	41%	52%	-	-	–	–
Christopher Newport University	Sep 9–21, 2020	796 (LV)	± 3.9%	43%	48%	-	-	2% (Note: "Another candidate" with 2%)	7%
Virginia Commonwealth University	Aug 28 – Sep 7, 2020	693 (LV)	± 6.22%	39%	52%	-	-	1% (Note: "Third party candidate" with 1%)	8%
SurveyMonkey/Axios	Aug 1–31, 2020	2,626 (LV)	–	41%	57%	-	-	–	2%
Roanoke College	Aug 9–22, 2020	566 (LV)	± 4.1%	39%	53%	-	-	3% (Note: "Some other candidate" with 3%)	5%
SurveyMonkey/Axios	Jul 1–31, 2020	3,178 (LV)	–	43%	55%	-	-	–	2%
Morning Consult	Jul 17–26, 2020	1,156 (LV)	± 2.9%	41%	52%	-	-	–	–
Virginia Commonwealth University	Jul 11–19, 2020	725 (LV)	± 6.2%	39%	50%	-	-	1%	10%
SurveyMonkey/Axios	Jun 8–30, 2020	1,619 (LV)	–	42%	57%	-	-	–	1%
Morning Consult	May 17–26, 2020	1,148 (LV)	–	42% (Note: Additional data sourced from FiveThirtyEight)	52%	-	-	–	–
Roanoke College	May 3–16, 2020	563 (LV)	± 4.1%	39%	51%	-	-	–	–
Virginia Commonwealth University	Mar 25 – Apr 8, 2020	812 (A)	± 4.5%	41%	51%	-	-	–	8%
Hampton University	Feb 25–28, 2020	768 (RV)	± 3.8%	38%	45%	-	-	–	–
Roanoke College	Feb 9–18, 2020	520 (LV)	± 4.3%	40%	48%	-	-	–	–
Mason-Dixon	Dec 12–16, 2019	625 (RV)	± 4.0%	45%	49%	-	-	–	6%
Virginia Commonwealth University	Dec 2–13, 2019	728 (LV)	± 5.1%	46%	49%	-	-	–	5%
Virginia Commonwealth University	Sep 23 – Oct 4, 2019	645 (LV)	± 5.0%	44%	52%	-	-	–	4%
University of Mary Washington/Research America	Sep 3–15, 2019	1,009 (A)	± 3.1%	37%	55%	-	-	1%	4%

Former candidates

with Donald Trump and Michael Bloomberg

Poll source	Date(s) administered	Sample size	Margin of error	Donald Trump (R)	Michael Bloomberg (D)
Hampton University	Feb 25–28, 2020	768 (RV)	± 3.8%	38%	43%
Roanoke College	Feb 9–18, 2020	520 (LV)	± 4.3%	40%	46%

with Donald Trump and Pete Buttigieg

Poll source	Date(s) administered	Sample size	Margin of error	Donald Trump (R)	Pete Buttigieg (D)	Undecided
Hampton University	Feb 25–28, 2020	768 (RV)	± 3.8%	38%	41%	–
Roanoke College	Feb 9–18, 2020	520 (LV)	± 4.3%	40%	47%	–
Mason-Dixon	Dec 12–16, 2019	625 (RV)	± 4.0%	47%	45%	8%

with Donald Trump and Kamala Harris

Poll source	Date(s) administered	Sample size	Margin of error	Donald Trump (R)	Kamala Harris (D)	Other	Undecided
University of Mary Washington	Sep 3–15, 2019	1,009 (A)	± 3.1%	38%	50%	2%	5%

with Donald Trump and Amy Klobuchar

Poll source	Date(s) administered	Sample size	Margin of error	Donald Trump (R)	Amy Klobuchar (D)
Hampton University	Feb 25–28, 2020	768 (RV)	± 3.8%	37%	39%
Roanoke College	Feb 9–18, 2020	520 (LV)	± 4.3%	39%	46%

with Donald Trump and Bernie Sanders

Poll source	Date(s) administered	Sample size	Margin of error	Donald Trump (R)	Bernie Sanders (D)	Other	Undecided
Hampton University	Feb 25–28, 2020	768 (RV)	± 3.8%	39%	44%	–	–
Roanoke College	Feb 9–18, 2020	520 (LV)	± 4.3%	40%	49%	–	–
Mason-Dixon	Dec 12–16, 2019	625 (RV)	± 4.0%	51%	45%	–	4%
Virginia Commonwealth University	Dec 2–13, 2019	728 (LV)	± 5.1%	48%	45%	–	7%
Virginia Commonwealth University	Sep 2 – Oct 4, 2019	645 (LV)	± 5.0%	47%	48%	–	5%
University of Mary Washington/Research America	Sep 3–15, 2019	1,009 (A)	± 3.1%	38%	53%	2%	4%

with Donald Trump and Elizabeth Warren

Poll source	Date(s) administered	Sample size	Margin of error	Donald Trump (R)	Elizabeth Warren (D)	Other	Undecided
Hampton University	Feb 25–28, 2020	768 (RV)	± 3.8%	40%	42%	–	–
Roanoke College	Feb 9–18, 2020	520 (LV)	± 4.3%	41%	48%	–	–
Mason-Dixon	Dec 12–16, 2019	625 (RV)	± 4.0%	48%	44%	–	8%
Virginia Commonwealth University	Dec 2–13, 2019	728 (LV)	± 5.1%	47%	47%	–	6%
Virginia Commonwealth University	Sep 23 – Oct 4, 2019	645 (LV)	± 5.0%	46%	50%	–	4%
University of Mary Washington	Sep 3–15, 2019	1,009 (A)	± 3.1%	38%	53%	1%	5%

Hypothetical polling

with Donald Trump and Generic Democrat

Poll source	Date(s) administered	Sample size	Margin of error	Donald Trump (R)	Generic Democrat	Other	Undecided
Wason Center, Christopher Newport University	Sep 4–30, 2019	726 (RV)	± 4.1%	36%	51%	6% (Note: "Would vote for a third party candidate" with 6%)	6%

with Donald Trump and Generic Opponent

Poll source	Date(s) administered	Sample size	Margin of error	Donald Trump (R)	Generic Opponent	Other	Undecided
Wason Center, Christopher Newport University	Feb 3–23, 2020	866 (RV)	± 3.5%	38%	59% (Note: "It is time to have someone else in office" as opposed to "Trump should be re-elected" with 59%)	0% (Note: "Refused" with 0%)	2%

with Generic Republican and Generic Democrat

Poll source	Date(s) administered	Sample size	Margin of error	Generic Republican	Generic Democrat	Other	Undecided
Virginia Commonwealth University	Sep 23 – Oct 4, 2019	645 (LV)	± 5.0%	48%	49%	–	3%
Ipsos/University of Virginia	Feb 15–19, 2019	636 (A)	± 4.0%	25%	45%	3%	20%

=== Results ===
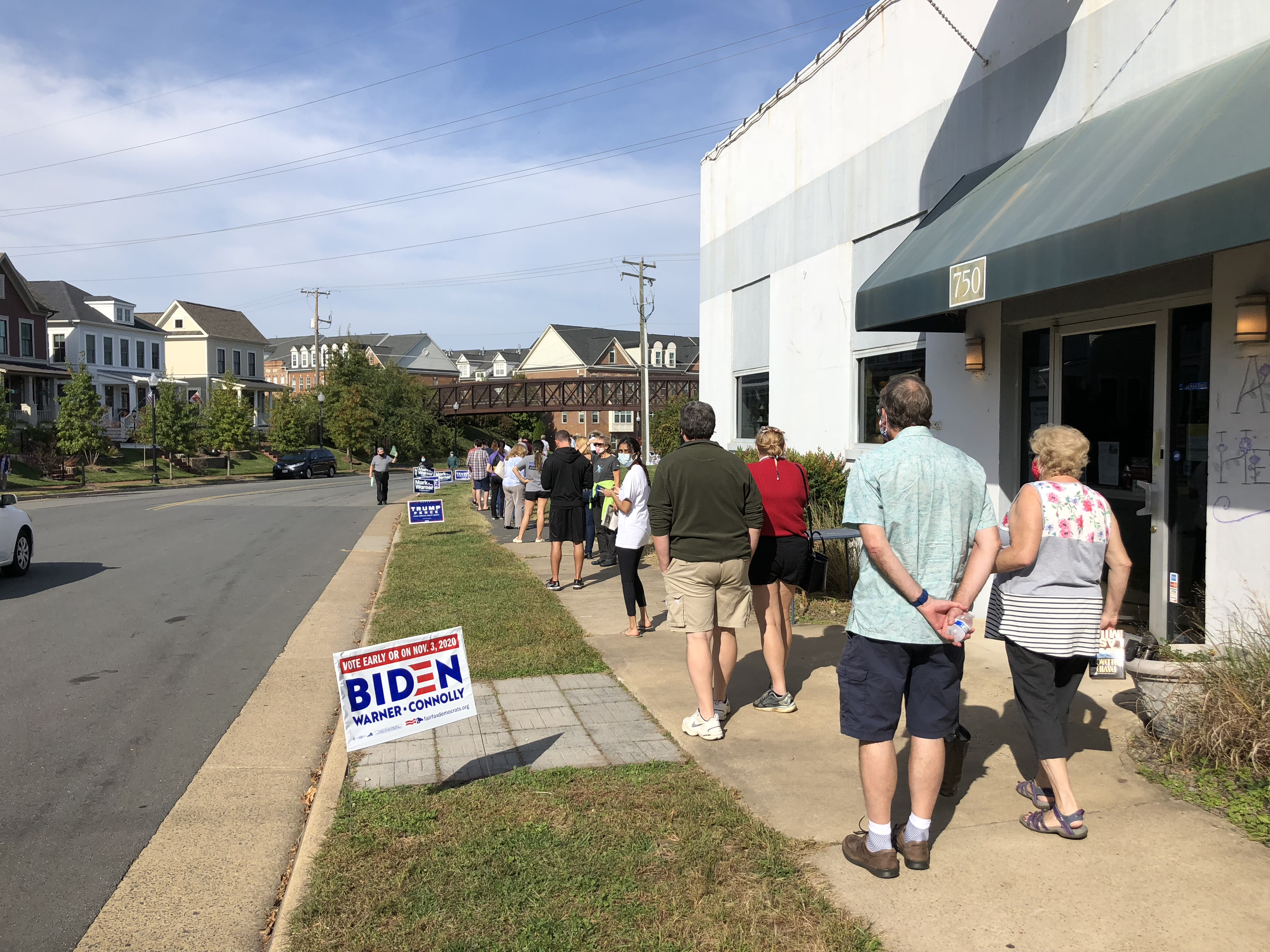
Line for early voting in Herndon

2020 United States presidential election in Virginia
Party	Candidate	Votes	%	±%
Democratic	Joe Biden Kamala Harris	2,413,568	54.11%	+4.38%
Republican	Donald Trump Mike Pence	1,962,430	44.00%	−0.41%
Libertarian	Jo Jorgensen Spike Cohen	64,761	1.45%	−1.52%
Write-in		19,765	0.44%	-0.41%
Total votes		4,460,524	100.00%	N/A

==== By county and independent city ====
Locality	Joe Biden Democratic		Donald Trump Republican		Other candidates Various parties		Margin		Total
Locality	#	%	#	%	#	%	#	%	Total
Accomack	7,578	44.68%	9,172	54.07%	212	1.25%	-1,594	-9.40%	16,962
Albemarle	42,466	65.68%	20,804	32.18%	1,387	2.15%	21,662	33.50%	64,657
Alexandria	66,240	80.28%	14,544	17.63%	1,724	2.09%	51,696	62.66%	82,508
Alleghany	2,243	27.34%	5,859	71.43%	101	1.23%	-3,616	-44.08%	8,203
Amelia	2,411	30.55%	5,390	68.29%	92	1.17%	-2,979	-37.74%	7,893
Amherst	5,672	33.35%	11,041	64.93%	292	1.72%	-5,369	-31.57%	17,005
Appomattox	2,418	26.09%	6,702	72.31%	148	1.60%	-4,284	-46.22%	9,268
Arlington	105,344	80.60%	22,318	17.08%	3,037	2.32%	83,026	63.52%	130,699
Augusta	10,840	25.64%	30,714	72.65%	724	1.71%	-19,874	-47.01%	42,278
Bath	646	25.83%	1,834	73.33%	21	0.84%	-1,188	-47.50%	2,501
Bedford	12,176	25.02%	35,600	73.15%	893	1.83%	-23,424	-48.13%	48,669
Bland	532	15.29%	2,903	83.44%	44	1.26%	-2,371	-68.15%	3,479
Botetourt	5,700	26.99%	15,099	71.49%	321	1.52%	-9,399	-44.50%	21,120
Bristol	2,313	29.63%	5,347	68.50%	146	1.87%	-3,034	-38.87%	7,806
Brunswick	4,552	57.27%	3,357	42.24%	39	0.49%	1,195	15.04%	7,948
Buchanan	1,587	15.94%	8,311	83.50%	55	0.55%	-6,724	-67.56%	9,953
Buckingham	3,471	42.71%	4,544	55.92%	111	1.37%	-1,073	-13.20%	8,126
Buena Vista	825	29.72%	1,863	67.11%	88	3.17%	-1,038	-37.39%	2,776
Campbell	8,070	27.00%	21,245	71.07%	577	1.93%	-13,175	-44.08%	29,892
Caroline	7,657	47.01%	8,336	51.18%	295	1.81%	-679	-4.17%	16,288
Carroll	2,842	18.16%	12,659	80.88%	150	0.96%	-9,817	-62.72%	15,651
Charles City	2,624	59.09%	1,761	39.65%	56	1.26%	863	19.43%	4,441
Charlotte	2,317	37.43%	3,815	61.62%	59	0.95%	-1,498	-24.20%	6,191
Charlottesville	20,696	85.50%	3,094	12.78%	415	1.71%	17,602	72.72%	24,205
Chesapeake	66,377	52.22%	58,180	45.77%	2,551	2.01%	8,197	6.45%	127,108
Chesterfield	106,935	52.45%	93,326	45.77%	3,623	1.78%	13,609	6.67%	203,884
Clarke	3,920	41.98%	5,192	55.61%	225	2.41%	-1,272	-13.62%	9,337
Colonial Heights	2,972	32.50%	6,007	65.68%	167	1.83%	-3,035	-33.18%	9,146
Covington	964	37.03%	1,580	60.70%	59	2.27%	-616	-23.67%	2,603
Craig	587	18.52%	2,536	80.03%	46	1.45%	-1,949	-61.50%	3,169
Culpeper	10,617	39.15%	16,012	59.05%	487	1.80%	-5,395	-19.90%	27,116
Cumberland	2,227	41.94%	3,019	56.85%	64	1.21%	-792	-14.92%	5,310
Danville	11,710	60.40%	7,428	38.31%	251	1.29%	4,282	22.08%	19,389
Dickenson	1,503	20.58%	5,748	78.71%	52	0.71%	-4,245	-58.13%	7,303
Dinwiddie	6,224	41.24%	8,695	57.61%	173	1.15%	-2,471	-16.37%	15,092
Emporia	1,612	67.70%	754	31.67%	15	0.63%	858	36.04%	2,381
Essex	3,038	49.17%	3,075	49.77%	65	1.05%	-37	-0.60%	6,178
Fairfax City	9,174	68.04%	4,007	29.72%	302	2.24%	5,167	38.32%	13,483
Fairfax County	419,943	69.89%	168,401	28.03%	12,479	2.08%	251,542	41.87%	600,823
Falls Church	7,146	81.03%	1,490	16.90%	183	2.08%	5,656	64.13%	8,819
Fauquier	17,565	40.23%	25,106	57.50%	990	2.27%	-7,541	-17.27%	43,661
Floyd	3,004	31.93%	6,225	66.17%	179	1.90%	-3,221	-34.24%	9,408
Fluvanna	7,414	46.81%	8,155	51.48%	271	1.71%	-741	-4.68%	15,840
Franklin City	2,525	62.22%	1,487	36.64%	46	1.13%	1,038	25.58%	4,058
Franklin County	8,381	28.22%	20,895	70.35%	426	1.43%	-12,514	-42.13%	29,702
Frederick	17,207	35.33%	30,558	62.74%	938	1.93%	-13,351	-27.41%	48,703
Fredericksburg	8,517	66.22%	4,037	31.39%	308	2.39%	4,480	34.83%	12,862
Galax	777	29.45%	1,838	69.67%	23	0.87%	-1,061	-40.22%	2,638
Giles	2,156	23.50%	6,876	74.93%	144	1.57%	-4,720	-51.44%	9,176
Gloucester	6,964	31.25%	14,875	66.76%	443	1.99%	-7,911	-35.50%	22,282
Goochland	6,685	39.44%	9,966	58.80%	299	1.76%	-3,281	-19.36%	16,950
Grayson	1,535	18.88%	6,529	80.30%	67	0.82%	-4,994	-61.42%	8,131
Greene	4,163	36.80%	6,866	60.70%	282	2.49%	-2,703	-23.90%	11,311
Greensville	2,627	57.43%	1,914	41.85%	33	0.72%	713	15.59%	4,574
Halifax	7,666	42.01%	10,418	57.09%	164	0.90%	-2,752	-15.08%	18,248
Hampton	46,220	70.14%	18,430	27.97%	1,251	1.90%	27,790	42.17%	65,901
Hanover	25,307	35.66%	44,318	62.45%	1,342	1.89%	-19,011	-26.79%	70,967
Harrisonburg	11,022	64.51%	5,591	32.72%	473	2.77%	5,431	31.79%	17,086
Henrico	116,572	63.65%	63,440	34.64%	3,140	1.71%	53,132	29.01%	183,152
Henry	9,127	34.96%	16,725	64.07%	253	0.97%	-7,598	-29.11%	26,105
Highland	417	27.20%	1,092	71.23%	24	1.57%	-675	-44.03%	1,533
Hopewell	5,430	56.52%	4,020	41.84%	158	1.64%	1,410	14.68%	9,608
Isle of Wight	9,399	40.07%	13,707	58.44%	350	1.49%	-4,308	-18.37%	23,456
James City	25,553	51.50%	23,153	46.66%	916	1.85%	2,400	4.84%	49,622
King and Queen	1,590	38.64%	2,450	59.54%	75	1.82%	-860	-20.90%	4,115
King George	5,404	37.99%	8,446	59.38%	374	2.63%	-3,042	-21.39%	14,224
King William	3,260	30.37%	7,320	68.18%	156	1.45%	-4,060	-37.82%	10,736
Lancaster	3,368	47.09%	3,697	51.69%	87	1.22%	-329	-4.60%	7,152
Lee	1,489	14.97%	8,365	84.10%	92	0.92%	-6,876	-69.13%	9,946
Lexington	1,791	64.84%	906	32.80%	65	2.35%	885	32.04%	2,762
Loudoun	138,372	61.54%	82,088	36.51%	4,402	1.96%	56,284	25.03%	224,862
Louisa	8,269	37.73%	13,294	60.66%	352	1.61%	-5,025	-22.93%	21,915
Lunenburg	2,418	40.30%	3,537	58.95%	45	0.75%	-1,119	-18.65%	6,000
Lynchburg	18,048	49.63%	17,097	47.02%	1,218	3.35%	951	2.62%	36,363
Madison	2,698	33.19%	5,300	65.20%	131	1.61%	-2,602	-32.01%	8,129
Manassas	10,356	61.03%	6,256	36.87%	356	2.10%	4,100	24.16%	16,968
Manassas Park	3,992	65.58%	1,979	32.51%	116	1.91%	2,013	33.07%	6,087
Martinsville	3,766	62.63%	2,165	36.01%	82	1.36%	1,601	26.63%	6,013
Mathews	1,825	31.33%	3,901	66.96%	100	1.72%	-2,076	-35.63%	5,826
Mecklenburg	6,803	41.98%	9,266	57.18%	135	0.83%	-2,463	-15.20%	16,204
Middlesex	2,491	36.71%	4,196	61.84%	98	1.44%	-1,705	-25.13%	6,785
Montgomery	23,218	51.55%	20,629	45.80%	1,190	2.64%	2,589	5.75%	45,037
Nelson	4,327	46.45%	4,812	51.65%	177	1.90%	-485	-5.21%	9,316
New Kent	4,621	31.95%	9,631	66.59%	211	1.46%	-5,010	-34.64%	14,463
Newport News	53,099	65.39%	26,377	32.48%	1,727	2.13%	26,722	32.91%	81,203
Norfolk	64,440	71.69%	23,443	26.08%	1,998	2.22%	40,997	45.61%	89,881
Northampton	3,667	54.47%	2,955	43.89%	110	1.63%	712	10.58%	6,732
Northumberland	3,252	41.61%	4,485	57.39%	78	1.00%	-1,233	-15.78%	7,815
Norton	464	28.98%	1,109	69.27%	28	1.75%	-645	-40.29%	1,601
Nottoway	2,971	41.98%	4,027	56.89%	80	1.13%	-1,056	-14.92%	7,078
Orange	7,995	38.54%	12,426	59.91%	321	1.55%	-4,431	-21.36%	20,742
Page	3,007	24.03%	9,345	74.68%	162	1.29%	-6,338	-50.65%	12,514
Patrick	1,954	20.50%	7,485	78.51%	95	1.00%	-5,531	-58.01%	9,534
Petersburg	12,389	87.75%	1,584	11.22%	145	1.03%	10,805	76.53%	14,118
Pittsylvania	10,115	29.55%	23,751	69.39%	361	1.05%	-13,636	-39.84%	34,227
Poquoson	2,054	26.14%	5,605	71.34%	198	2.52%	-3,551	-45.20%	7,857
Portsmouth	30,948	69.42%	12,755	28.61%	879	1.97%	18,193	40.81%	44,582
Powhatan	5,320	26.96%	14,055	71.24%	355	1.80%	-8,735	-44.27%	19,730
Prince Edward	4,973	51.94%	4,434	46.31%	167	1.74%	539	5.63%	9,574
Prince George	7,103	40.75%	10,103	57.96%	226	1.30%	-3,000	-17.21%	17,432
Prince William	142,863	62.64%	81,222	35.61%	3,971	1.74%	61,641	27.03%	228,056
Pulaski	4,925	28.34%	12,127	69.79%	324	1.86%	-7,202	-41.45%	17,376
Radford	3,358	53.13%	2,786	44.08%	176	2.78%	572	9.05%	6,320
Rappahannock	2,096	42.11%	2,812	56.49%	70	1.41%	-716	-14.38%	4,978
Richmond City	92,175	82.92%	16,603	14.94%	2,381	2.14%	75,572	67.99%	111,159
Richmond County	1,513	36.88%	2,547	62.09%	42	1.02%	-1,034	-25.21%	4,102
Roanoke City	26,773	61.80%	15,607	36.02%	943	2.18%	11,166	25.77%	43,323
Roanoke County	21,801	38.12%	34,268	59.93%	1,115	1.95%	-12,467	-21.80%	57,184
Rockbridge	4,086	33.02%	8,088	65.37%	199	1.61%	-4,002	-32.34%	12,373
Rockingham	12,644	28.86%	30,349	69.27%	818	1.87%	-17,705	-40.41%	43,811
Russell	2,373	17.73%	10,879	81.27%	134	1.00%	-8,506	-63.54%	13,386
Salem	5,148	39.45%	7,683	58.87%	220	1.69%	-2,535	-19.42%	13,051
Scott	1,692	15.57%	9,063	83.38%	114	1.05%	-7,371	-67.82%	10,869
Shenandoah	6,836	28.86%	16,463	69.51%	385	1.63%	-9,627	-40.65%	23,684
Smyth	3,008	21.28%	10,963	77.55%	165	1.17%	-7,955	-56.27%	14,136
Southampton	3,969	40.56%	5,730	58.55%	87	0.89%	-1,761	-18.00%	9,786
Spotsylvania	34,307	45.55%	39,411	52.33%	1,599	2.12%	-5,104	-6.78%	75,317
Stafford	40,245	50.54%	37,636	47.27%	1,744	2.19%	2,609	3.28%	79,625
Staunton	6,981	53.74%	5,695	43.84%	314	2.42%	1,286	9.90%	12,990
Suffolk	28,676	57.77%	20,082	40.45%	884	1.78%	8,594	17.31%	49,642
Surry	2,397	53.61%	2,025	45.29%	49	1.10%	372	8.32%	4,471
Sussex	2,827	55.56%	2,219	43.61%	42	0.83%	608	11.95%	5,088
Tazewell	3,205	15.92%	16,731	83.10%	198	0.98%	-13,526	-67.18%	20,134
Virginia Beach	117,393	51.59%	105,087	46.18%	5,081	2.23%	12,306	5.41%	227,561
Warren	6,603	31.22%	14,069	66.53%	475	2.25%	-7,466	-35.31%	21,147
Washington	6,617	23.07%	21,679	75.58%	389	1.36%	-15,062	-52.51%	28,685
Waynesboro	4,961	46.29%	5,507	51.39%	249	2.32%	-546	-5.09%	10,717
Westmoreland	4,501	45.31%	5,318	53.54%	114	1.15%	-817	-8.23%	9,933
Williamsburg	4,790	69.59%	1,963	28.52%	130	1.89%	2,827	41.07%	6,883
Winchester	6,610	54.60%	5,221	43.13%	275	2.27%	1,389	11.47%	12,106
Wise	3,110	18.72%	13,366	80.45%	139	0.84%	-10,256	-61.73%	16,615
Wythe	3,143	20.85%	11,733	77.85%	196	1.30%	-8,590	-56.99%	15,072
York	17,683	45.59%	20,241	52.19%	863	2.22%	-2,558	-6.59%	38,787
Totals	2,413,568	54.11%	1,962,430	44.00%	84,526	1.89%	451,138	10.11%	4,460,524

===== Counties and independent cities that flipped from Republican to Democratic =====
- Chesapeake (independent city)
- Chesterfield (no municipalities)
- James City (no municipalities)
- Lynchburg (independent city)
- Stafford (no municipalities)
- Virginia Beach (independent city)

==== By congressional district ====
Biden won seven of Virginia's 11 congressional districts.

District	Trump	Biden	Representative
1st	51%	47%	Rob Wittman
2nd	47%	51%	Elaine Luria
3rd	31%	67%	Bobby Scott
4th	37%	62%	Donald McEachin
5th	53%	45%	Denver Riggleman
5th	53%	45%	Bob Good
6th	60%	38%	Ben Cline
7th	49%	50%	Abigail Spanberger
8th	21%	77%	Don Beyer
9th	70%	28%	Morgan Griffith
10th	39%	59%	Jennifer Wexton
11th	28%	70%	Gerry Connolly

== Analysis ==
In this election, Virginia voted 5.6% more Democratic than the nation as a whole. Although Virginia was considered a reliably Republican state at the presidential level from 1952 to 2004 (having only gone to the Democrats once during that period, in Lyndon B. Johnson's 1964 landslide), it has not voted Republican in a presidential election since then. In recent years, densely populated counties in Northern Virginia close to Washington, D.C., have tilted towards the Democrats. This was the first election since 1988 that a presidential candidate won Virginia by double digits (George H. W. Bush having carried the state by 20.5% in his first run), and the first election in which any presidential candidate received over 2 million votes in Virginia.

As fellow Southern state Georgia tilted towards Biden, he became the first Democrat since Harry Truman in 1948 to carry both states. This was also the first election in which a former Confederate state backed a Democratic candidate by a margin of victory greater than 10% since 1996, when Arkansas and Louisiana did so for Bill Clinton.

Following the election, news and political analysts considered the presidential results in Virginia, along with Democrats holding the senate seat held by Mark Warner, their house congressional majority, plus the previous year's elections in which Democrats flipped the state General Assembly, to be indicative that it was no longer a swing state, but a blue state. Democrats did win the state again in 2024, albeit by a smaller margin of about 6%.

Their domination of state and local offices would be short-lived, however, as in 2021 the Republicans flipped the Democratic-held offices of governor, lieutenant governor, and attorney general, as well as winning control of the Virginia House of Delegates. In 2023, Democrats recaptured the House of Delegates, winning full control of the General Assembly once again, albeit by narrower margins than what they acquired in 2019.

=== Voter demographics ===
Edison Research exit poll
Demographic subgroup	Biden	Trump	No Answer	% of Voters
Party
Democrat	96	4	N/A	36
Republican	9	90	N/A	34
Independent	57	38	N/A	30
Gender
Men	49	48	1	49
Women	61	38	1	51
Race
White	45	53	2	67
Black	89	10	1	18
Latino	61	36	3	7
Asian	60	38	2	4
Other	50	43	7	3
Gender by race/ethnicity
White men	39	58	3	33
White women	50	49	1	33
Black men	86	14	N/A	8
Black women	92	8	N/A	11
Latino men (of any race)	53	41	6	3
Latino women (of any race)	68	32	N/A	4
All other races	58	40	2	8
Gender by marital status
Married men	50	49	N/A	29
Married women	51	47	N/A	28
Unmarried men	58	39	3	20
Unmarried women	69	30	N/A	23
Parents
Men with children	49	49	1	15
Women with children	58	41	1	19
Men no children	53	43	4	34
Women no children	60	38	2	32
Age
18–24 years old	62	33	1	12
25–29 years old	63	34	3	8
30–39 years old	60	38	2	17
40–49 years old	63	36	1	16
50–64 years old	48	51	N/A	29
65 and older	45	54	1	18
LGBT
Yes	83	11	N/A	5
No	53	43	4	95
First time voter
First time voter	65	32	3	9
Everyone else	55	42	N/A	91
U.S. military veteran
Yes	36	62	N/A	16
No	59	38	N/A	84
Education
College graduate	57	40	N/A	43
No college degree	53	46	1	57
Education by race/ethnicity
White college graduates	52	45	3	33
White no college degree	38	62	N/A	34
Non-white college graduates	75	24	1	10
Non-white no college degree	76	22	2	23
Income
Under $50,000	60	39	1	33
$50,000–99,999	52	47	1	27
Over $100,000	46	53	1	41
Abortion should be
Legal	78	20	2	54
Illegal	29	69	1	42
Area Type
Urban	64	34	2	24
Suburban	53	45	2	60
Rural	46	52	2	16
Region
DC Suburbs	68	30	N/A	30
Central Virginia	44	53	3	16
Hampton Roads	62	36	N/A	16
Richmond/Southside	56	42	N/A	18
Mountain	35	63	N/A	20
Source: CNN

== See also ==
- United States presidential elections in Virginia
- 2020 United States presidential election
- 2020 Democratic Party presidential primaries
- 2020 Republican Party presidential primaries
- 2020 United States elections

== Notes ==
Partisan clients
