= Hillary Pugh Kent =

American politician from Virginia

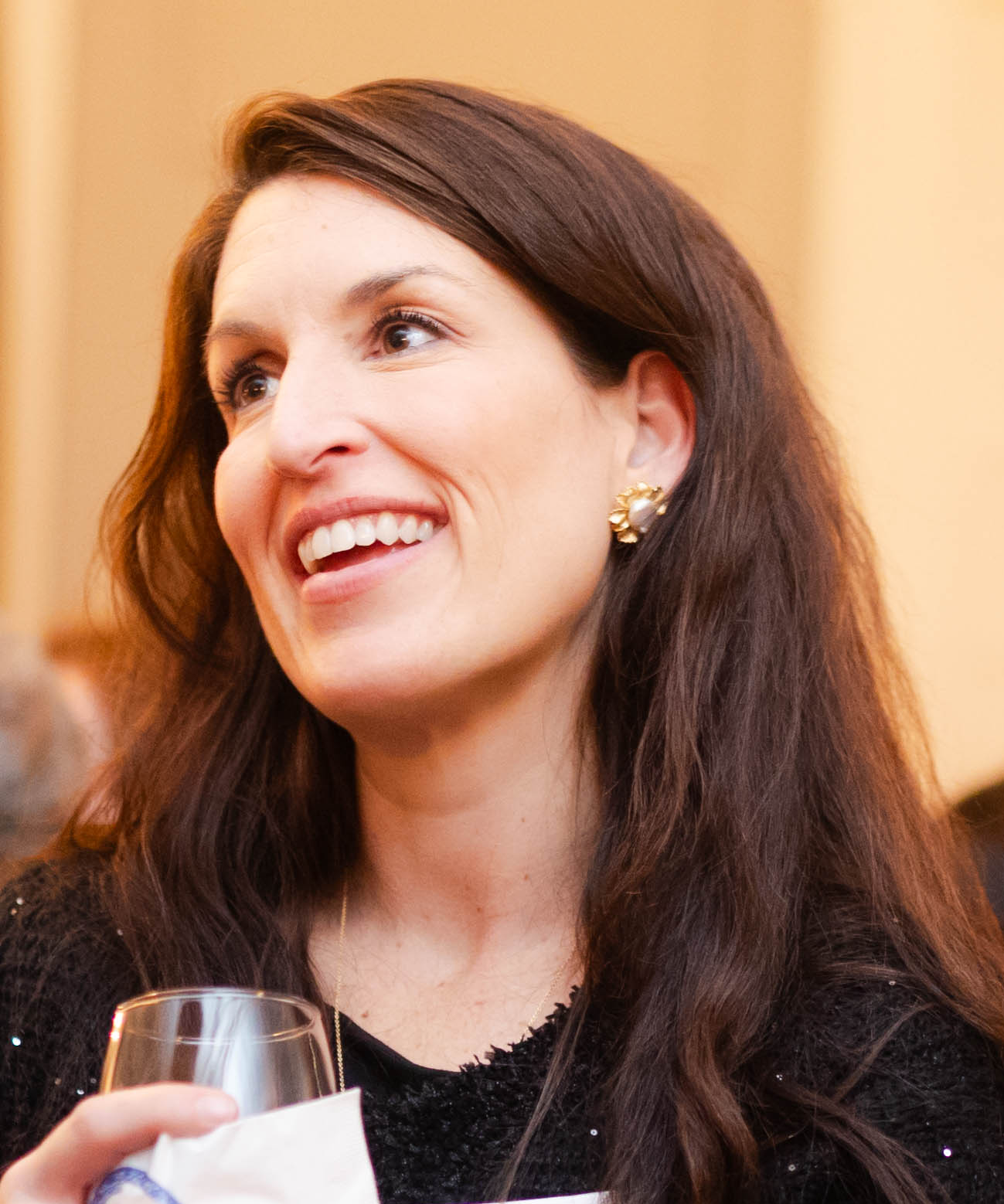

Member of the Virginia House of Delegates from the 67th district
- Incumbent
- Assumed office January 10, 2024
- Preceded by: Margaret Ransone (Redistricting)

Personal details
- Party: Republican

Hillary Pugh Kent is an American Republican politician from Virginia. She was elected to the Virginia House of Delegates in the 2023 Virginia House of Delegates election from the 67th district.

Kent was the vice chair of the board of directors for the Warsaw Richmond County Main Street Program.

Virginia House of Delegates
Preceded by Karrie Delaney	Member of the Virginia House of Delegates from the 67th district 2024–Present	Incumbent
