= Karrie Delaney =

American politician from Virginia

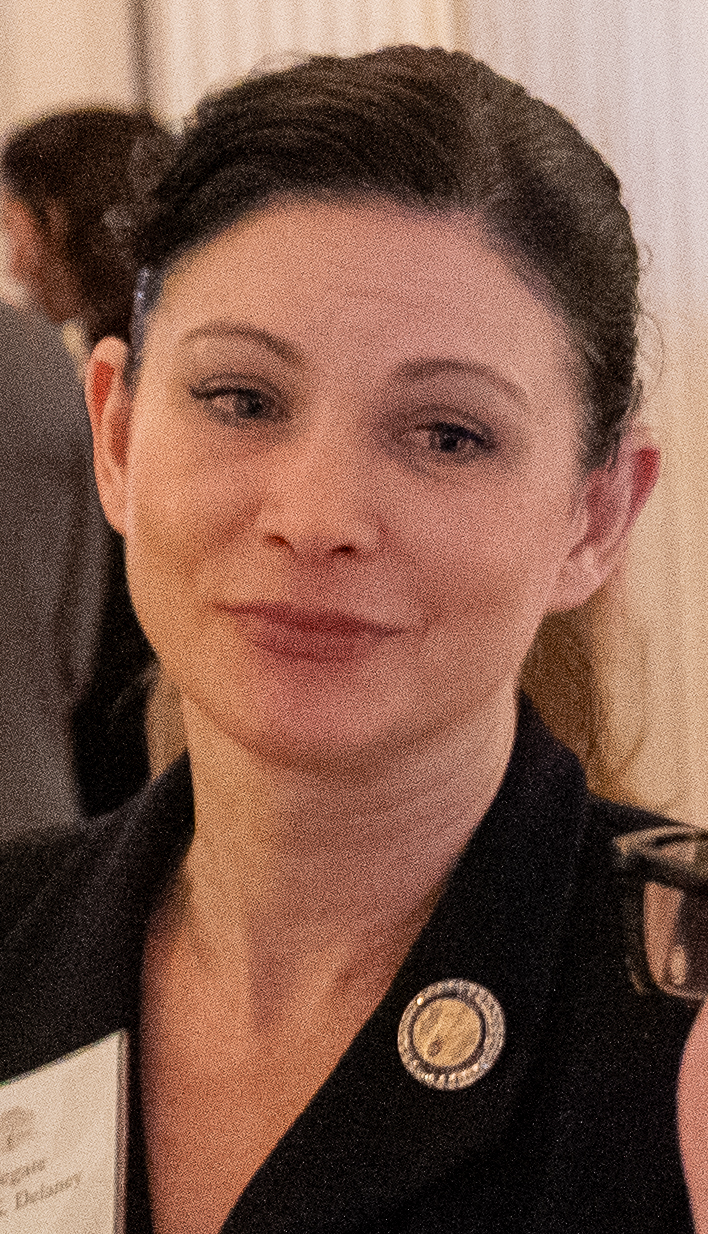
- Delaney in 2024

Member of the Virginia House of Delegates
- Incumbent
- Assumed office January 10, 2018
- Preceded by: James LeMunyon
- Constituency: 67th District (2018–2024); 9th District (2024–Present)

Personal details
- Born: December 5, 1978 (age 47) Tampa, Florida, U.S.
- Party: Democratic
- Other political affiliations: Republican (formerly)
- Children: 2
- Education: University of South Florida
- Committees: Courts of Justice; Health, Welfare and Institutions; Transportation
- Website: karriedelaney.com

Karrie Kristine Delaney (born December 5, 1978) is an American politician serving as a Democratic member of the Virginia House of Delegates since 2018. She was first elected in 2017 defeating incumbent Republican Jim LeMunyon, and represents the 9th district based in western Fairfax County. The district encompasses Bull Run, Centreville, Chantilly, and Greenbriar. Before her election as state delegate, Delaney served on numerous boards and commissions in Virginia. She previously served on the West Melbourne, Florida city council as a Republican before moving to Northern Virginia.

== Political career ==
In 2017, Delaney ran for the Virginia House of Delegates for the 67th district, then held by Republican incumbent James LeMunyon. Delaney won the June 2017 Democratic primary with 65% of the vote, defeating two other candidates. In the general election, Delaney defeated LeMunyon by a 58-42 margin.

== Electoral history ==
Virginia House of Delegates, 67th District
Date	Election	Candidate	Party	Votes	%
June 12, 2017	Democratic primary	Karrie K. Delaney		3,887	65.3
June 12, 2017	Democratic primary	Hannah K. Risheq		1,355	22.8
June 12, 2017	Democratic primary	John W. Carey		706	11.9
November 6, 2017	General	Karrie K. Delaney	Democratic	17,036	57.9
November 6, 2017	General	James LeMunyon	Republican	12,365	42.0
November 6, 2017	General	Write Ins		42	0.1
November 5, 2019	General	Karrie K. Delaney	Democratic	16,859	89.3
November 5, 2019	General	Write Ins		2,011	10.7
November 2, 2021	General	Karrie K. Delaney	Democratic	21,111	60.7
November 2, 2021	General	Bob Frizzelle	Republican	13,649	39.2
November 2, 2021	General	Write Ins		44	0.1

Virginia House of Delegates
Preceded by James LeMunyon	Member of the Virginia House of Delegates from the 67th district 2018–2024	Succeeded by Hillary Pugh Kent
Preceded by Wren Williams	Member of the Virginia House of Delegates from the 9th district 2024–Present	Incumbent
