= Virginia's 67th House of Delegates district =

Virginia legislative district

District map from the 2023 election

Virginia's 67th House of Delegates district elects one of 100 seats in the Virginia House of Delegates, the lower house of the state's bicameral legislature consisting of the counties of Caroline (part), King George, Lancaster, Northumberland, Richmond, and Westmoreland has been represented by Republican Hillary Pugh Kent since 2024.

== List of delegates ==
Delegate	Party	Years	Electoral history
George W. Jones	Republican	January 12, 1983 – January 11, 1984	Lost reelection in 1983
Leslie Saunders	Democratic	January 11, 1984 – January 13, 1988	Lost reelection in 1987
Steve Martin	Republican	January 13, 1988 – January 8, 1992	Redistricted
Roger McClure	Republican	January 8, 1992 – January 9, 2002	
Gary Reese	Republican	January 9, 2002 – January 11, 2006	Lost renomination in 2005.
Chuck Caputo	Democratic	January 11, 2006 – January 10, 2010	Lost reelection in 2009.
James LeMunyon	Republican	January 13, 2010 – January 10, 2018	Lost reelection in 2017.
Karrie Delaney	Democratic	January 10, 2018 – January 10, 2024	Redistricted
Hillary Pugh Kent	Republican	January 10, 2024 – present	Elected in 2023
