= List of Libertarian Party of Virginia candidates =

This is a list of Libertarian Party of Virginia candidates.

== Candidates ==
=== Bill Redpath ===
Bill Redpath ran in Virginia's 34th House of Delegates district (1993), Virginia's 33rd Senate district (1998), Virginia gubernatorial election, 2001, Virginia U.S. Senate election, 2008, and in Virginia's 10th congressional district (2010 and 2014).

=== Ron Crickenberger ===
Ron Crickenberger was the national political director of the United States Libertarian Party from 1997 until his death from metastatic melanoma in 2003. He also ran for Congress in Virginia's 8th congressional district in 2000 and 2002. Crickenberger focused the party's efforts on drug policy reform, and in 2002, police forcibly removed him and several other protestors from the Department of Justice building after they refused to cooperate. Crickenberger also conducted a successful drive to encourage more Libertarians to run for public office, with the number of Libertarians holding elected office more than tripled, from 180 to about 600.

Date	Election	Candidate	Party	Votes	%
U.S. House, 8th district
7 November 2000	General	James P. Moran, Jr.	Democratic	164,178	63.3
7 November 2000	General	Demaris H. Miller	Republican	88,262	34.1
7 November 2000	General	Richard L. Herron	Independent	3,483	1.3
7 November 2000	General	Ron V. Crickenberger	Independent	2,805	1.1
7 November 2000	General	Write Ins		471	
5 November 2002	General	James P. Moran, Jr.	Democratic	102,759	59.8
5 November 2002	General	Scott C. Tate	Republican	64,121	37.3
5 November 2002	General	Ron V. Crickenberger	Independent	4,558	2.7
5 November 2002	General	Write Ins		361	

=== Gary Reams ===
Gary Reams, a Quaker and former Democrat, ran for the U.S. House in the 10th congressional district on a platform calling for downsizing the federal government. He ran in the Virginia lieutenant gubernatorial election, 2001 on a platform calling for cannabis legalization.

Date	Election	Candidate	Party	Votes	%
U.S. House, 10th district
5 November 1996	General	Frank R. Wolf	Republican	169,266	72.0
5 November 1996	General	Robert L. Weinerg	Democratic	59,145	25.2
5 November 1996	General	Gary A. Reams	Independent	6,500	2.8
5 November 1996	General	Write Ins		102	
Lieutenant Governor of Virginia
5 November 2001	General	Tim M. Kaine	Democratic	925,974	50.3
5 November 2001	General	Jay K. Katzen	Republican	883,886	48.1
5 November 2001	General	Gary A. Reams	Libertarian	28,783	1.6
5 November 2001	General	Write Ins		490	

=== Robert Sarvis ===
Robert Sarvis ran in Virginia's 35th Senate district election (2011), in the Virginia gubernatorial election, 2013, and in the United States Senate election in Virginia, 2014.

=== Cliff Hyra ===
Clifford D. "Cliff" Hyra (born September 3, 1982) is an American patent attorney and politician. In 2007 Cliff Hyra graduated from George Mason University School of Law and became a registered patent attorney who is licensed to practice in Virginia and the District of Columbia.

The Libertarian Party nominated Cliff Hyra by convention on May 6, 2017 for the 2017 Virginia gubernatorial election after he collected the 10,000 signatures that he needed. After being denied entry into the Virginia governor debates Hyra chose to watch the debate remotely and refused to take the seat the bar offered him in the VIP area at the 90-minute debate.

=== Matt Waters ===
Matt Waters is the most recent candidate to run statewide in the Virginia Libertarian Party. In 2018, he ran for the U.S. Senate. Shortly after the election, he rejoined the Republican Party and ran against Libertarian Michael Bartley in the 2023 70th district Virginia House of Delegates race.

=== Will Hammer ===
Will Hammer ran for House of Representatives for Virginia's 6th district in the 2014 election and for the Virginia House of Delegates in the 20th district in 2015 and 2017.

=== Joshua Huffman ===
Joshua Huffman is a political scientist who ran for Harrisonburg City Council in the 2014 election (as an independent with the support of the Libertarian Party of Virginia) and was the only Libertarian candidate for the Virginia Senate in 2023 running in the 2nd district in the 2023 Virginia Senate Election.

=== Dave Crance ===
Dave Crance is running for the Virginia House of Delegates in the 13th district in 2025 and previously ran for the same seat in the 2023 elections.

=== Michael Bartley ===
Michael Bartley ran for the Virginia House of Delegates in the 70th district in the 2023 elections.
