= Virginia's 47th House of Delegates district =

Virginia legislative district

District map from the 2023 election

Virginia's 47th House of Delegates district elects one of 100 seats in the Virginia House of Delegates, the lower house of the state's bicameral legislature. District 47 represents all of the City of Galax, Patrick County, Floyd County, Carroll County, and part of Henry County. The seat is currently held by Republican Wren Williams.

== Geography ==
District 47 is located in Virginia's 9th Congressional District.

== Elections ==
Democrat Patrick A. Hope first took office in 2010, after winning a three-way race in the 2009 general election; he earned 63.54% of the vote. He has been reelected in 2011, 2013, 2015, and 2017, each time winning at least 76% of the vote. In 2019, he ran unopposed in the general election. In the 2021 Democratic primary, Hope faces a challenge from Matt Rogers, chief of staff for state senator Dave Marsden.
