= Green Party of Virginia =

- Non-Male Co-chair: Vacant
- Non-Female Co-chair: Tom Yager
- Treasurer: Kirit Mookerjee
- Founded: 1993
- Headquarters: P.O. Box 7316; Falls Church, Virginia 22040
- Ideology: Green politics Eco-socialism; Anti-capitalism; Communalism; Municipalization
- Political position: Left-wing
- National affiliation: Green Party of the United States
- Colors: Green
- Seats in the US Senate: 0 / 2
- Seats in the US House: 0 / 11
- Seats in the VA Senate: 0 / 40
- Seats in the VA House: 0 / 100
- VA statewide offices held: 0 / 3
- Lord Fairfax Conservation District: 1 / 12
- Skyline Conservation District: 1 / 10

Website
- www.VAGreenParty.org

The Green Party of Virginia (GPVA) is a state-level political party in Virginia founded in 1993. It is the state affiliate of the Green Party of the United States.

GPVA runs candidates on an ecology platform. The party had its first electoral victory in 1997.

== Campaigns ==
The Green Party of Virginia consistently elects Directors to Soil & Water Conservation Districts and often runs candidates for various local positions and for the state legislature.

The party earned its first electoral victories in November 1997 when Phil Welch was elected to the Buena Vista Soil & Water Conservation District board and Stephanie Porras was elected to the Lexington Soil & Conservation District Board. Since that time, several other GPVA members have run for office in both partisan and non-partisan races, with notable victories at the town council and SWCD level.

In 2015, Jeff Staples ran for Virginia House of Delegates in the 81st District against Republican Barry Knight and received a total of 30.3% of the vote.

In 2016, Montigue Magruder and Rebecca Keel ran in the Richmond citywide elections and gathered nearly 12% of the votes in their respective districts. Kristen Lawson won the seat to represent Richmond's 4th district with 4,762 votes, 36.9% of the total.

== Presidential elections ==
| Year | Nominee | Votes |
|---|---|---|
| 1996 | Ralph Nader | Not on ballot |
| 2000 | Ralph Nader | 59,398 (2.17%) |
| 2004 | David Cobb (write-in) | 104 (<0.01%) |
| 2008 | Cynthia McKinney | 2,344 (0.06%) |
| 2012 | Jill Stein | 8,627 (0.22%) |
| 2016 | Jill Stein | 27,638 (0.69%) |
| 2020 | Howie Hawkins (write-in) | Not on ballot |
| 2024 | Jill Stein | 34,888 (0.77%) |

== Officeholders ==
=== Current ===
- Ira Richards, Lord Fairfax Soil & Water Conservation District Board of Directors
- Thomas Adams, Skyline Soil & Water Conservation District Board of Directors

=== Former ===
List incomplete

- Kathleen Harrigan, Fredericksburg Soil & Water Conservation District Board of Directors
- Daniel Metraux, Staunton Soil & Water Conservation District Board of Directors
- Chris Simmons, Loudoun Soil & Water Conservation District Board of Directors
- Buck Richards, Warren County Soil & Water Conservation District Board of Directors
- Giannina Franz, Fredericksburg Soil and Water Conservation District Board of Directors
- Wendy Hageman Smith, Appomattox County School Board
- Kristen Larson, Richmond City Council District 4
