= Democratic Party of Virginia =

Virginia affiliate of the Democratic Party

- Chairperson: Lamont Bagby
- Governor of Virginia: Abigail Spanberger
- Lieutenant Governor of Virginia: Ghazala Hashmi
- Senate President Pro Tempore: Louise Lucas
- Senate Majority Leader: Scott Surovell
- Speaker of the House of Delegates: Don Scott
- Founded: 1924
- Headquarters: 919 East Main Street; Richmond, Virginia 23223
- Student wing: Virginia College Democrats
- Youth wing: Virginia Young Democrats
- Women's wing: Virginia Democratic Women’s Caucus
- Overseas wing: Democrats Abroad
- LGBT wing: LGBT Democrats of Virginia
- Membership (October 6, 2026): ▼3,090,860
- National affiliation: Democratic Party
- Colors: Blue
- Government of Virginia: 3 / 3
- Virginia Senate: 21 / 40
- Virginia House of Delegates: 64 / 100
- United States Senate: 2 / 2
- United States House of Representatives: 6 / 11
- Fairfax County Board of Supervisors: 9 / 10

Election symbol

Website
- www.vademocrats.org

The Democratic Party of Virginia (DPVA/VA Dems) is the Virginia affiliate of the Democratic Party based in Richmond, Virginia.

Historically, the Democratic Party has dominated Virginia politics. Since the 1851 Virginia gubernatorial election, the first gubernatorial election in Virginia in which the governor was elected by direct popular vote, 34 Virginia Governors have been Democrats. Since the 1851 Virginia lieutenant gubernatorial election, the first lieutenant gubernatorial election in Virginia in which the lieutenant governor was elected by direct popular vote, 29 Virginia Lieutenant Governors have been Democrats. Since the 1851 Virginia Attorney General election, the first Attorney General election in Virginia in which the Attorney General was elected by direct popular vote, 25 Attorneys General have been Democrats.

It is currently the dominant party in Virginia politics. As of 2026, Democrats hold all 3 statewide elected offices in the state (Governor, Lieutenant Governor, and Attorney General), a 21–19 majority in the Virginia Senate, and a 64–36 majority in the Virginia House of Delegates. At the federal level, Virginia has voted for every Democratic presidential candidate since 2008. Democrats hold six of the Commonwealth's 11 U.S. House seats and both of the Commonwealth's U.S. Senate seats.

== Organization ==
=== Staff ===
- Executive Director: Chris Bolling
- Deputy Executive Director and Chief Technology Officer: Brenner Tobe
- Data Director: Katie O'Grady
- Political Director: Emily Hamm

=== Steering Committee ===
The Steering Committee makes decisions about the Party in-between meetings of the Central Committee, and also has an exclusive role of overseeing staff.

- Chair: Lamont Bagby
- 1st Vice Chair for Organization: Gaylene Kanoyton
- 2nd Vice Chair for Rules and Resolutions: Marc Broklawsk
- Vice Chair for Technology and Communications: Ricardo Alfaro
- Vice Chair for Outreach: Sen. L. Louise Lucas
- Vice Chair for Finance: Clarence Tong
- Secretary: Isaac Sarver
- Treasurer: Abbi Easter
- DNC Member: Sen. Jennifer Carroll Foy
- DNC Member: Doris Crouse-Mays
- DNC Member: Bryan Graham
- DNC Member: Harry Khanna
- DNC Member: Tram Nguyen
- DNC Member: Elaine Kamarck
- 1st Congressional District Democratic Committee Chair: Dianne Carter de Mayo
- 2nd Congressional District Democratic Committee Chair: Sandra Brandt
- 3rd Congressional District Democratic Committee Chair: Charles Stanton
- 4th Congressional District Democratic Committee Chair: Alexsis Rodgers
- 5th Congressional District Democratic Committee Chair: Patricia Harper Tunley
- 6th Congressional District Democratic Committee Chair: Kym Crump
- 7th Congressional District Democratic Committee Chair: Matt Rowe
- 8th Congressional District Democratic Committee Chair: Margo Horner
- 9th Congressional District Democratic Committee Chair: Rebecca Daly
- 10th Congressional District Democratic Committee Chair: Zach Pruckowski
- 11th Congressional District Democratic Committee Chair: Manisha Singh
- Labor Caucus Chair: Julie Hunter
- Associations of Local Chairs Chair: Tina Winkler
- Democratic Black Caucus Chair: EJ Scott
- Women's Caucus Chair: Hala Ayala
- LGBT Democrats of Virginia Chair: Joel McDonald
- Veterans and Military Families Caucus Chair: Charley Conrad
- Virginia Young Democrats President: Kara Kline
- DisAbility Caucus Chair: Cyliene Montgomery
- Democratic Asian Americans of Virginia Chair: Shyamali Hauth
- Democratic Latino Organization of Virginia President: Carla Bustillos
- Rural Caucus Chair: Roberta Thacker-Oliver
- Small Business Caucus Chair: Mark Cannady
- Immediate Past Chair: Susan Swecker

=== Central Committee ===
The Central Committee has full control over all matters of the Party, including the adoption of an annual budget, the method of nomination for statewide candidates such as Governor, Lieutenant Governor and Attorney General; the adoption of resolutions and policy statements. In addition, the Central Committee can veto any decision of the Steering Committee.

The Central Committee meets at least four times a year, usually in Richmond, although by tradition, the September meeting is in Fredericksburg. Central Committee meetings are accompanied by meetings of the Steering Committee the night before, and Caucus meetings over the weekend.

The Central Committee is composed of 20 members from each of Virginia's 11 congressional districts. Each district apportions the central committee seats to localities in the district based on population. Additionally, each district committee can elect three more members from local committees and one member of the Virginia General Assembly. The Central Committee is "reorganized" every four years following the election for Governor. The last reorganization was held in March 2022.

In addition, the following people are ex-officio members of the Central Committee and their District Committees:

- Members of the steering committee
- Democratic Virginia members of the United States Congress
- Democratic statewide elected officials, such as Governor, Lieutenant Governor, and Attorney General
- the President Pro Tempore of the Virginia Senate and the Speaker of the House of Delegates, provided they are Democrats
- the Democratic Leaders of the Virginia House and Senate
- the Chairs of the Democratic Caucuses in Virginia the House and Senate
- the president, national committeeman, and national committeewoman of the Virginia Young Democrats
- the president and first vice president of the Women's Caucus
- the chair of the Association of Democratic Elected Officials
- the chair of the Virginia Young Democrats Teen Caucus
- the chair of the Virginia Young Democrats College Caucus
- and the chair of the Virginia Young Democrats City/County Caucus

=== Local Democratic Committees ===
Local Democratic Committees serve to promote the Democratic Party in their specific locality. Some committees may contain several localities. Local committees may endorse candidates for nonpartisan office (such as school board) and assist in campaigning for their candidate.

== Current elected officials ==
=== Members of Congress ===
==== U.S. Senate ====
Democrats have controlled both of Virginia's seats in the U.S. Senate since 2008:

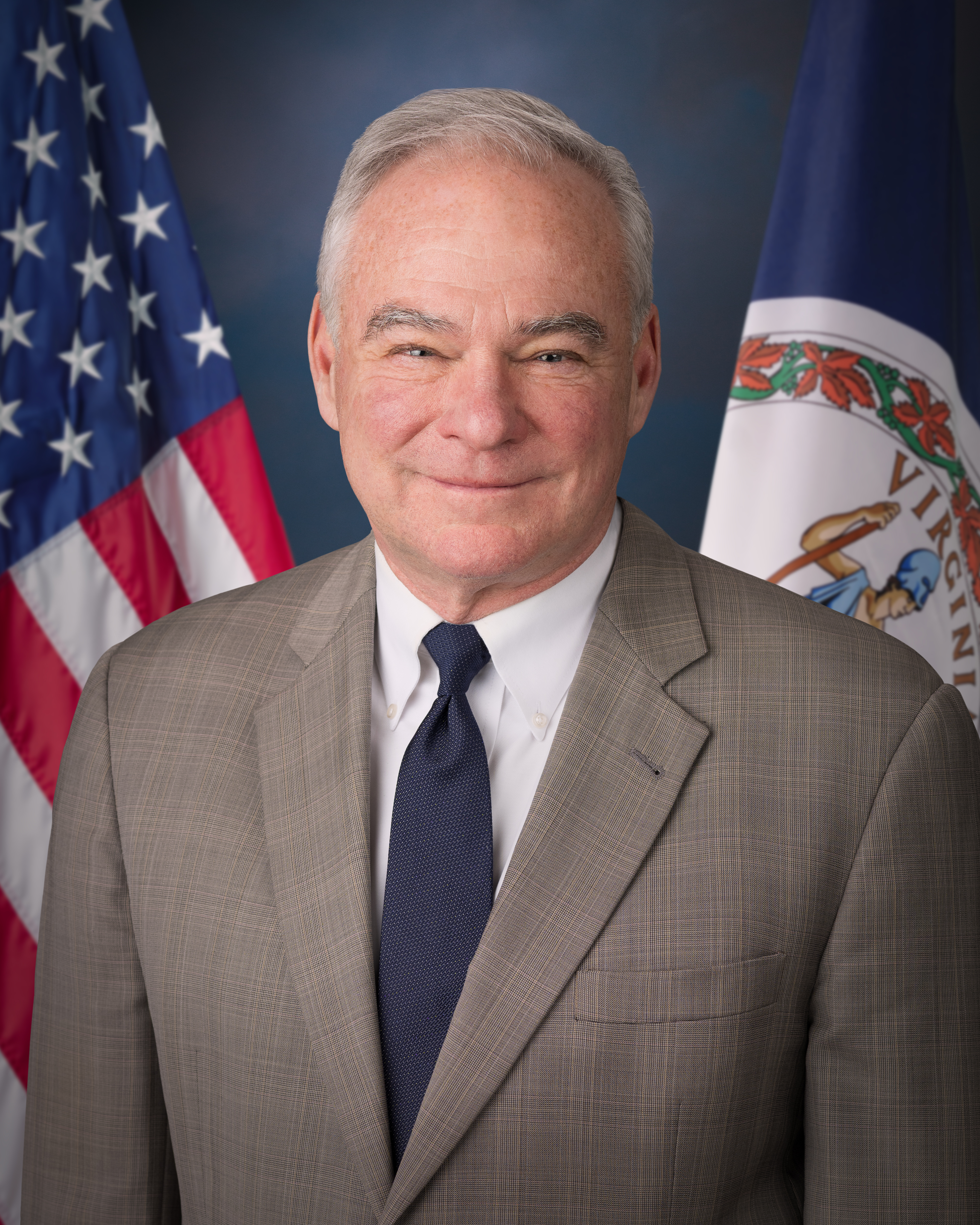
Junior U.S. Senator Tim Kaine

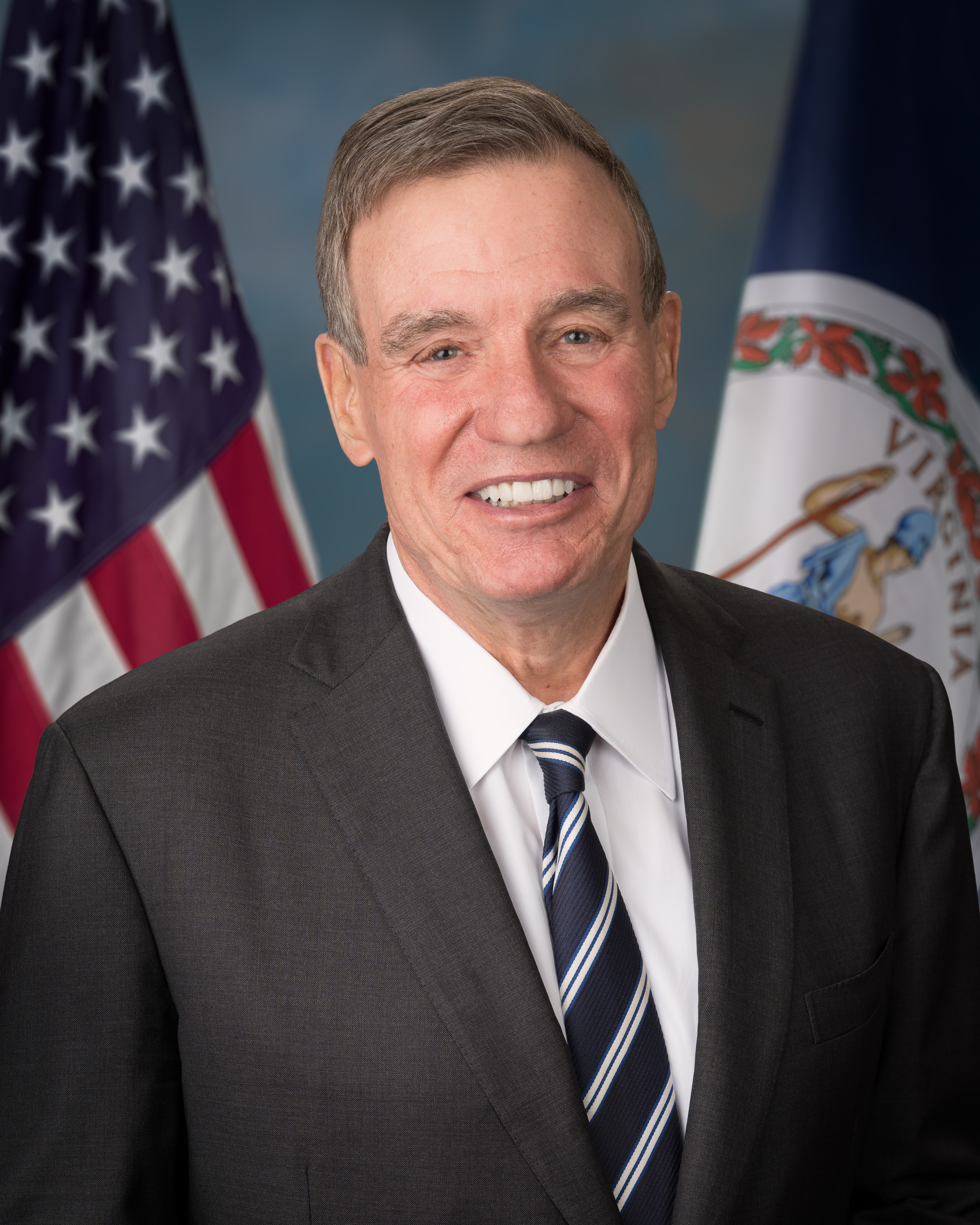
Senior U.S. Senator Mark Warner

==== U.S. House of Representatives ====
Out of the 11 seats Virginia is apportioned in the U.S. House of Representatives, six are held by Democrats:

District	Member	Photo
1st	Shannon Taylor (elect)	
2nd	Elaine Luria (elect)	
3rd	Bobby Scott	
4th	Jennifer McClellan	
7th	Eugene Vindman	
8th	Don Beyer	
10th	Suhas Subramanyam	
11th	James Walkinshaw	

=== Statewide offices ===
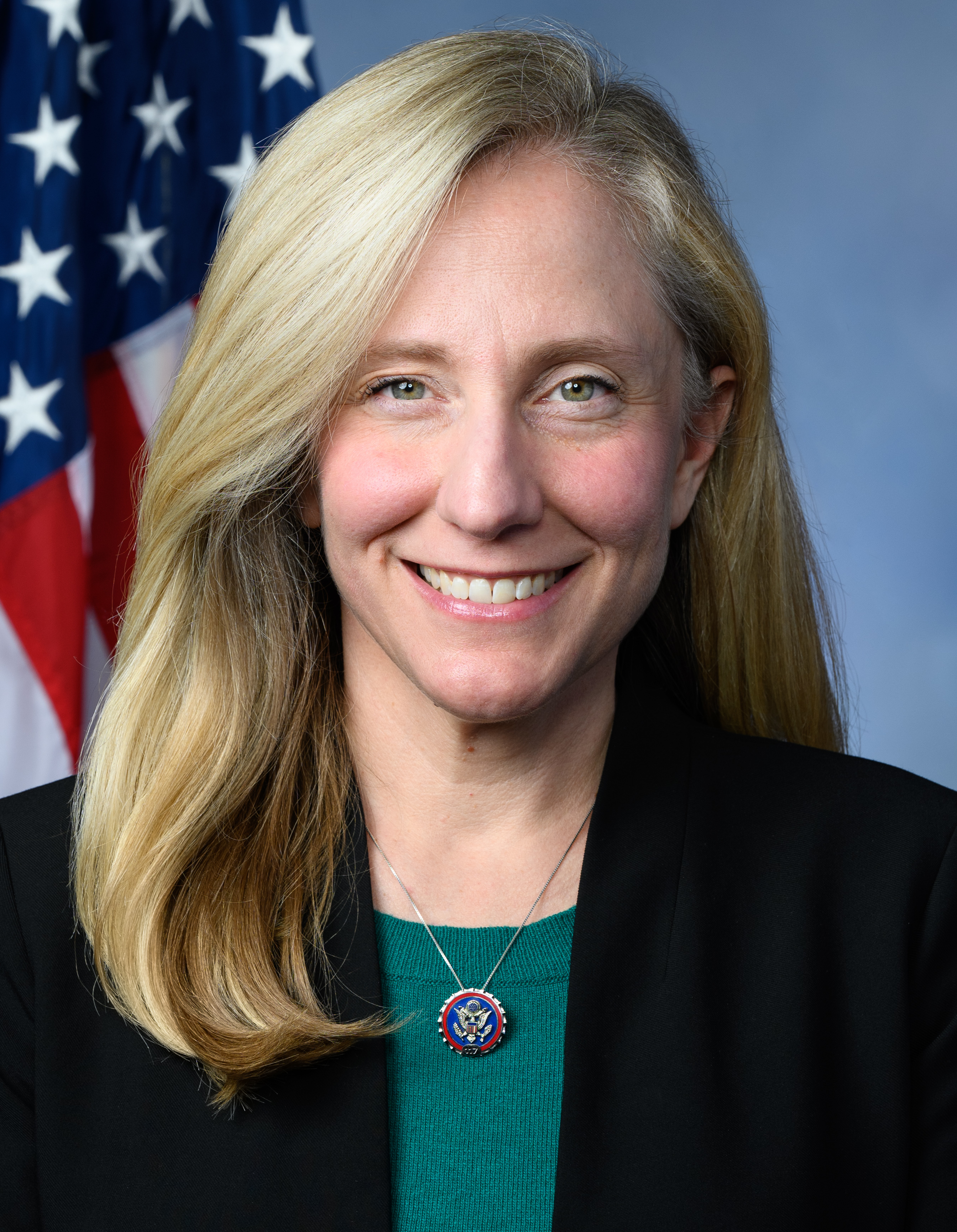
Governor Abigail Spanberger

Lieutenant Governor Ghazala Hashmi

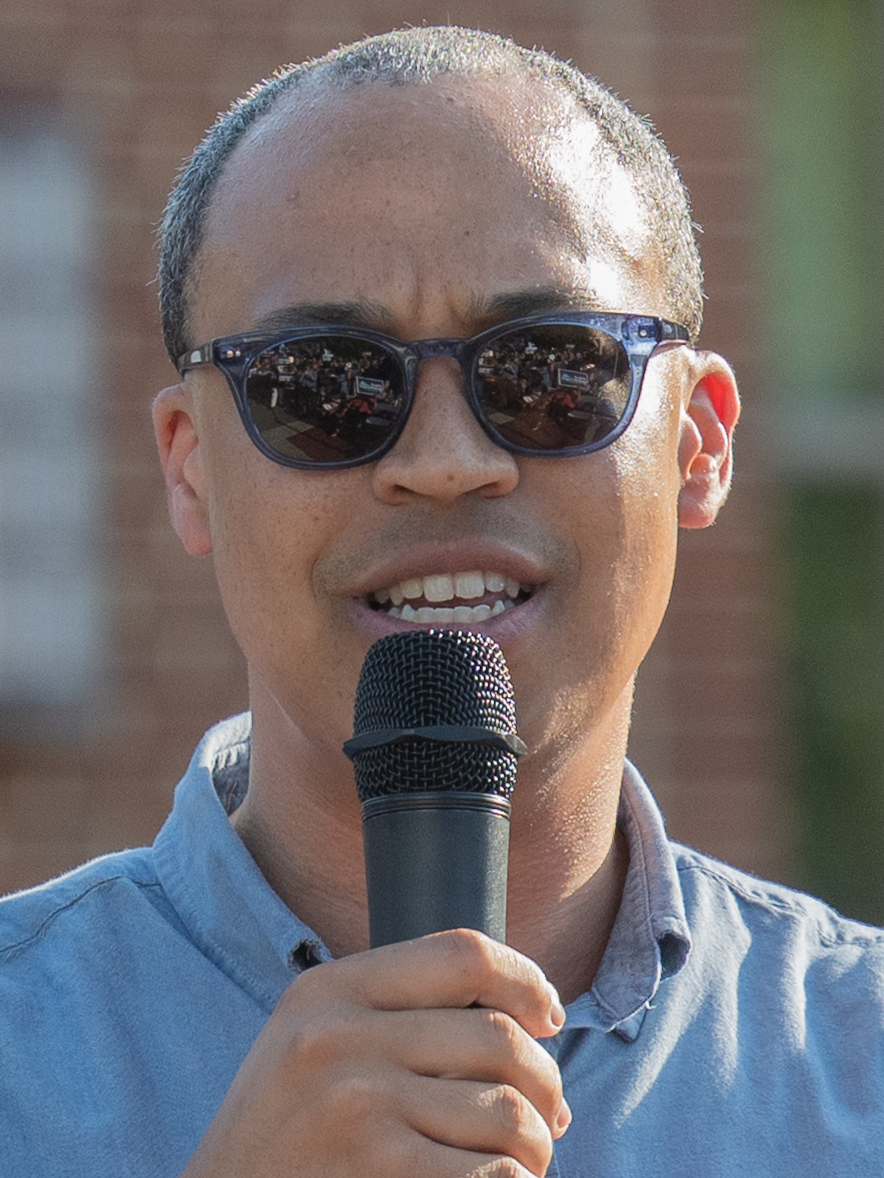
Attorney General Jay Jones

=== Legislative leadership ===
- President pro tempore of the Senate of Virginia: Louise Lucas
- Senate Majority Leader: Scott Surovell
- Senate Caucus Chair: Mamie Locke
- Speaker of the House of Delegates: Don Scott
- House Majority Leader: Charniele Herring
- House Caucus Chair: Kathy Tran

=== Mayors ===
- Norfolk: Kenny Alexander (3)
- Richmond: Danny Avula (4)
- Newport News: Phillip Jones (5)
- Alexandria: Alyia Gaskins (6)
- Roanoke: Joe Cobb (9)

== List of chairs ==
- John S. Barbour Jr. (1883–1889)
- Basil B. Gordon (1889–1890)
- J. Taylor Ellyson (1890–1916)
- Rorer A. James (1916–1921)
- Henry D. Flood (1921)
- Harry F. Byrd (1922–1924)
- J. Murray Hooker (1925–1940)
- Horace H. Edwards (1940–1948)
- G. Alvin Massenburg (1948–1952)
- William M. Tuck (July 1952–August 1952)
- T. Nelson Parker (August 1952–December 1952)
- Thomas H. Blanton (1952–1964)
- Watkins Abbitt Sr. (1964–1970)
- William G. Thomas (1970–1972)
- Joseph T. Fitzpatrick (1972–1979)
- Richard J. Davis (1979–1980)
- Owen B. Pickett (1980–1982)
- Alan Diamonstein (1982–1985)
- Richard J. Davis (1985–1986)
- Lawrence H. Framme III (1986–1990)
- Paul Goldman (1990–1993)
- Mark Warner (1993–1995)
- Suzie Wrenn (1995–1998)
- Kenneth R. Plum (1998–2000)
- Emily Couric (Co-chair, 2000–2001)
- Lawrence H. Framme III (Co-chair, 2000–2001; 2001–2003)
- Kerry J. Donley (2003–2005)
- Richard Cranwell (2005–2010)
- Brian Moran (2010–2012)
- Charniele Herring (2012–2014)
- Dwight C. Jones (2014 – March 27, 2015)
- Susan Swecker (March 27, 2015 – March 22, 2025)
- Lamont Bagby (since March 22, 2025)

== Controversies ==
=== 2019 Virginia political crisis ===
In 2019, all three of Virginia's statewide executive office holders, all Democrats, were embroiled in various controversies. Governor Ralph Northam's medical school yearbook page had featured an individual in blackface and an individual in a Ku Klux Klan hood, Lieutenant Governor Justin Fairfax was accused of having sexually assaulted a professor in 2004, and Attorney General Mark Herring was revealed to have worn blackface at a college party. Most Democrats urged Northam to resign from the governorship, but he refused. Ultimately, none of the three accused resigned.

== Historical firsts ==
African Americans

- First African American Governor of Virginia and Lieutenant Governor of Virginia: Douglas Wilder
- First African American Attorney General of Virginia: Jay Jones

Arab Americans

- First Lebanese-American member of the Virginia House of Delegates: Hala Ayala
- First Palestinian-American member of the Virginia House of Delegates: Sam Rasoul

Asian Americans

- First Indian American Lieutenant Governor of Virginia: Ghazala Hashmi
- First Korean-American member of the Virginia House of Delegates: Mark Keam
- First Vietnamese-American member of the Virginia House of Delegates: Kathy Tran
- First Filipino-American member of the Virginia House of Delegates: Kelly Fowler

Jewish Americans

- First Jewish American to represent Virginia in the United States House of Representatives: Norman Sisisky
- First Jewish American Speaker of the Virginia House of Delegates: Eileen Filler-Corn

Latino Americans

- First Peruvian-American member of the Virginia House of Delegates: Elizabeth Guzmán
- First Salvadoran-American member of the Virginia House of Delegates: Hala Ayala
- First Mexican-American member of the Virginia House of Delegates: Kelly Fowler

LGBT

- First openly gay member of the Virginia House of Delegates and Senate of Virginia: Adam Paul Ebbin
- First openly lesbian member of the Virginia House of Delegates: Dawn M. Adams
- First openly transgender member of the Virginia House of Delegates: Danica Roem

Muslim Americans

- First Muslim American Lieutenant Governor of Virginia: Ghazala Hashmi

Women

- First female Attorney General of Virginia: Mary Sue Terry
- First female Governor of Virginia: Abigail Spanberger
- First female Speaker of the Virginia House of Delegates: Eileen Filler-Corn

== Election results ==
=== Federal ===
==== U.S. Senate ====
Class 1
Year	Candidate	Votes	%	Result
1970	George Rawlings	294,582	31.15%	Lost ✗
1976	Elmo Zumwalt	596,009	38.27%	Lost ✗
1982	Dick Davis	690,839	48.80%	Lost ✗
1988	Chuck Robb	1,474,086	71.25%	Won ✓
1994	Chuck Robb	938,376	45.61%	Won ✓
2000	Chuck Robb	1,296,093	47.68%	Lost ✗
2006	Jim Webb	1,175,606	49.59%	Won ✓
2012	Tim Kaine	2,010,067	52.83%	Won ✓
2018	Tim Kaine	1,910,370	57.00%	Won ✓
2024	Tim Kaine	2,417,115	54.37%	Won ✓

Class 2
Year	Candidate	Votes	%	Result
1972	William Spong Jr.	643,963	46.12%	Lost ✗
1978	Andrew P. Miller	608,511	49.79%	Lost ✗
1984	Edythe Harrison	601,142	29.95%	Lost ✗
1990	Did not participate			
1996	Mark Warner	1,115,981	47.39%	Lost ✗
2002	Did not participate			
2008	Mark Warner	2,369,317	65.03%	Won ✓
2014	Mark Warner	1,073,667	49.50%	Won ✓
2020	Mark Warner	2,466,500	55.99%	Won ✓
2026	Mark Warner	2,251,628	61.60%	Won ✓

==== U.S. House ====
Election	Votes	%	Seats (VA)	±	%
2016	1,859,426	49.17	4 / 11	▲1	19.58
2018	1,867,061	56.59	7 / 11	▲3	7.52
2020	2,253,974	52.20	7 / 11	0	4.49
2022	1,572,296	51.59	6 / 11	▼1	0.61
2024	2,274,922	51.40	6 / 11	0	0.19
2026	2,141,172	58.90	8 / 11	▲2	7.50

=== State ===
==== Executive offices ====
Governor
Election	Candidate	Votes	%	Result
1953	Thomas B. Stanley	226,998	54.83%	Won ✓
1957	J. Lindsay Almond	326,921	63.16%	Won ✓
1961	Albertis Harrison	251,861	63.85%	Won ✓
1965	Mills Godwin	269,526	47.89%	Won ✓
1969	William C. Battle	415,695	45.39%	Lost ✗
1973	Did not participate			
1977	Henry Howell	541,319	43.27%	Lost ✗
1981	Chuck Robb	760,357	56.51%	Won ✓
1985	Gerald Baliles	741,438	55.20%	Won ✓
1989	Douglas Wilder	896,936	50.13%	Won ✓
1993	Mary Sue Terry	733,527	40.89%	Lost ✗
1997	Don Beyer	738,971	42.56%	Lost ✗
2001	Mark Warner	984,177	52.16%	Won ✓
2005	Tim Kaine	1,025,942	51.72%	Won ✓
2009	Creigh Deeds	818,950	41.25%	Lost ✗
2013	Terry McAuliffe	1,069,789	47.74%	Won ✓
2017	Ralph Northam	1,408,818	53.89%	Won ✓
2021	Terry McAuliffe	1,599,470	48.64%	Lost ✗
2025	Abigail Spanberger	1,976,857	57.58%	Won ✓

Lieutenant Governor
Year	Candidate	Votes	%	Result
2013	Ralph Northam	1,213,155	55.12%	Won ✓
2017	Justin Fairfax	1,368,261	52.72%	Won ✓
2021	Hala Ayala	1,608,030	49.17%	Lost ✗
2025	Ghazala Hashmi	1,900,104	55.65%	Won ✓

Attorney General
Year	Candidate	Votes	%	Result
2013	Mark Herring	1,105,045	49.91%	Won ✓
2017	Mark Herring	1,385,390	53.33%	Won ✓
2021	Mark Herring	1,621,227	49.55%	Lost ✗
2025	Jay Jones	1,804,940	53.14%	Won ✓

== See also ==
- Politics of Virginia
- Republican Party of Virginia
