= Evelyn Momsen Hailey =

American politician

Member of the Virginia Senate from the 5th/6th/7th district
- In office January 1982 – January 11, 1984
- Preceded by: Joseph T. Fitzpatrick
- Succeeded by: Clancy Holland

Member of the Virginia House of Delegates from the 39th district
- In office January 9, 1974 – January 1982
- Preceded by: Albert Teich

Personal details
- Born: Evelyn Clare Momsen; April 21, 1921 Saint Paul, Minnesota, U.S.
- Died: March 29, 2011 (aged 89) Williamsburg, Virginia, U.S.
- Party: Democratic
- Spouse: Robert Hailey
- Children: Robert H. Hailey, Anne Hailey Bartee, Christopher T. Hailey

Evelyn Clare Momsen Hailey (April 21, 1921 – March 29, 2011) was an American politician. A Democrat, she served in the Virginia House of Delegates 1974–1982 and the Senate of Virginia 1982–1984, while living in the city of Norfolk.

== Early life ==
Evelyn Clare Momsen was born April 21, 1921, to Charles B. "Swede" Momsen (1896–1967), a United States Navy officer assigned to the battleship USS Oklahoma, and Anna Lyles Momsen (née Offutt) (d. 1953). Shortly after Evelyn's birth, her father transferred to submarine duty; he became known for his work in underwater rescue techniques, including development of the Momsen lung. He retired as a vice admiral. She had a brother, Charles Jr., who followed his father to the United States Naval Academy.

The Momsen family traveled widely on Navy duty. They were stationed at Pearl Harbor during the Japanese attack on December 7, 1941.

On March 26, 1943, Evelyn Momsen married Robert Hailey, a Navy officer. They had three children, Robert H., Anne and Christopher. Robert Hailey rose to the rank of captain.

== Political career ==
In 1973, Evelyn Hailey ran for the House of Delegates in Norfolk's seven-member 39th district, along with six incumbent Democrats. She presented the image of "everyone's fifth-grade teacher," in the words of the Norfolk Ledger-Star, giving chicken recipes to voters. She finished seventh in the overall voting, behind her fellow Democrats, but defeated the lone Republican incumbent, Albert Teich, 9.55%-8.37%. She was the first female delegate from Norfolk since Sarah Lee Fain, one of the first two female legislators in Virginia, left the House in 1929.

Hailey and the six other Democrats were unopposed in 1975, and all won reelection in 1977. Another woman, Edythe Harrison, joined Hailey on the slate during another Democratic sweep, this time against a full slate of Republicans, in 1979.

In the first 1981 redistricting, which was later overturned in court, the Norfolk House district, renumbered the 37th, was reduced from seven members to five. Hailey was not renominated. In the elections that November, Democratic state Senator Joseph T. Fitzpatrick was elected Norfolk city treasurer, creating a vacancy in the three-member 5th district. Hailey replaced him in a special election on January 13, 1982, defeating Republican Wayne Lustig, 54.3%-46.7%. Hailey served out the balance of Fitzpatrick's term, then retired.

== Later life ==
Hailey and her husband moved to Williamsburg, Virginia, c.1992. She died March 29, 2011.
