= Paul Goldman =

Paul Goldman may refer to:

- Paul Goldman (director), Australian film director, screenwriter and cinematographer
- Paul Goldman (politician), American politician in Virginia
- Paul T. Goldman, a comedic docuseries created by Jason Woliner
