= Couric (surname) =

Couric is a surname. Notable people with the surname include:

- Emily Couric (1947–2001), American politician
- Katie Couric (born 1957), American journalist, presenter, producer, and author
