= 1984 Virginia ballot measures =

The 1984 Virginia State Elections took place on Election Day, November 6, 1984, the same day as the U.S. Presidential, U.S. Senate, and U.S. House elections in the state. The only statewide elections on the ballot were two constitutional referendums to amend the Virginia State Constitution. Because Virginia state elections are held on off-years, no statewide officers or state legislative elections were held. All referendums were referred to the voters by the Virginia General Assembly.

== Question 1 ==
This amendment asked voters to permit members of local governing bodies to be elected or appointed to vacancies in the office of mayor or board chairman.

Question 1
Choice	Votes	%
For	1,131,019	70.69
Against	468,843	29.31
Total	1,599,862	100.00
Source: - Official Results

== Question 2 ==
This amendment asked voters to add a Balanced Budget Amendment to the state constitution.

Question 2
Choice	Votes	%
For	1,194,262	74.36
Against	411,689	25.64
Total	1,605,951	100.00
Source: - Official Results
