= Suzie Wrenn =

American public relations consultant

Chair of the Virginia Democratic Party
- In office September 1995 – March 1998
- Preceded by: Mark Warner
- Succeeded by: Kenneth R. Plum

Personal details
- Born: 1940/1941 (age 84–85)
- Political party: Democratic

Suzie Wrenn (born 1940/1941) is an American public relations consultant who served as the chair of the Virginia Democratic Party from 1995 to 1998. She was the first woman to serve in the role.

== Career ==
Wrenn worked as a policy and public relations aide in the Carter Administration. She was chief of staff to U.S. representative Barbara Mikulski. Wrenn is a self-described moderate. She worked as a public relations and government affairs consultant. Wrenn served a two-year term as the chair of the Fairfax County Democratic Party. During her tenure, two Democrats, including Katherine Hanley, won special elections, shifting the Fairfax County Board of Supervisors from seven to three Republicans to an even five to five split.

In September 1995, Wrenn became chair of the Virginia Democratic Party, succeeding Mark Warner. At the time of her selection, she had been active in politics for three decades. Wrenn was the first woman to serve in the role. During her tenure, the party lost the 1996 United States Senate election and three statewide races in 1997. Wrenn resigned on March 7, 1998.

== Personal life ==
Wrenn was born in 1940 or 1941. She resided in Great Falls, Virginia in 1995. She was based in Alexandria, Virginia by 1998.

Party political offices
Preceded by Mark Warner	Chair of the Virginia Democratic Party; 1995–1998	Succeeded by Kenneth R. Plum
