= Albert Teich =

American politician (1929–2010)

Member of the Virginia House of Delegates from the 39th district
- In office November 1979 – January 9, 1980
- Preceded by: J. Warren White Jr.
- Succeeded by: Edythe Harrison
- In office January 12, 1972 – January 9, 1974
- Preceded by: Stanley C. Walker
- Succeeded by: Evelyn M. Hailey

Personal details
- Born: February 22, 1929 Norfolk, Virginia, U.S.
- Died: October 2, 2010 (aged 81) Norfolk, Virginia, U.S.
- Party: Republican
- Spouse: Lillian Borleis
- Education: University of Virginia

Military service
- Allegiance: United States
- Branch/service: United States Air Force
- Rank: Second Lieutenant
- Battles/wars: Korean War

Albert Teich Jr. (February 22, 1929 – October 2, 2010) was an American lawyer and politician.

Teich was born in Norfolk, Virginia. He went to the College of William & Mary and University of Virginia. He served in the United States Air Force during the Korean War. He then went to the University of Virginia School of Law and was admitted to the Virginia bar. He practice law in Norfolk and taught at the Old Dominion University. Teich served in the Virginia House of Delegates from 1972 to 1974 and was a Republican. After that, he made orphanage for underprivileged children. He then served as clerk of the Norfolk Circuit Court from 1996 to 2004.
