= Lawrence H. Framme III =

American attorney and politician

Larry Framme

Chair of the Democratic Party of Virginia
- In office December 2, 2000 – November 15, 2003 Serving with Emily Couric until October 2001
- Preceded by: Ken Plum
- Succeeded by: Kerry J. Donley
- In office May 10, 1986 – January 13, 1990
- Preceded by: Dick Davis
- Succeeded by: Paul Goldman

7th Virginia Secretary of Economic Development
- In office January 13, 1990 – July 1992
- Governor: Douglas Wilder
- Preceded by: Curry A. Roberts
- Succeeded by: Cate Magennis

Personal details
- Born: Lawrence Henry Framme III; October 8, 1949 (age 76) Kentucky, U.S.
- Party: Democratic
- Education: Centre College; Washington & Lee University

Lawrence Henry Framme III (born October 8, 1949) is an American attorney who twice served as chair of the Democratic Party of Virginia.

He was elected to his first term at the age of 37, after which he was selected by Governor Douglas Wilder to serve as state Secretary of Commerce (then called Secretary of Economic Development). In 2000, Framme ran alongside state senator Emily Couric for the respective positions of State Chair and General Chair; the positions were created after Couric was diagnosed with pancreatic cancer and suspended her run for lieutenant governor.
