= Kenneth R. Plum =

American politician (born 1941)

Ken Plum
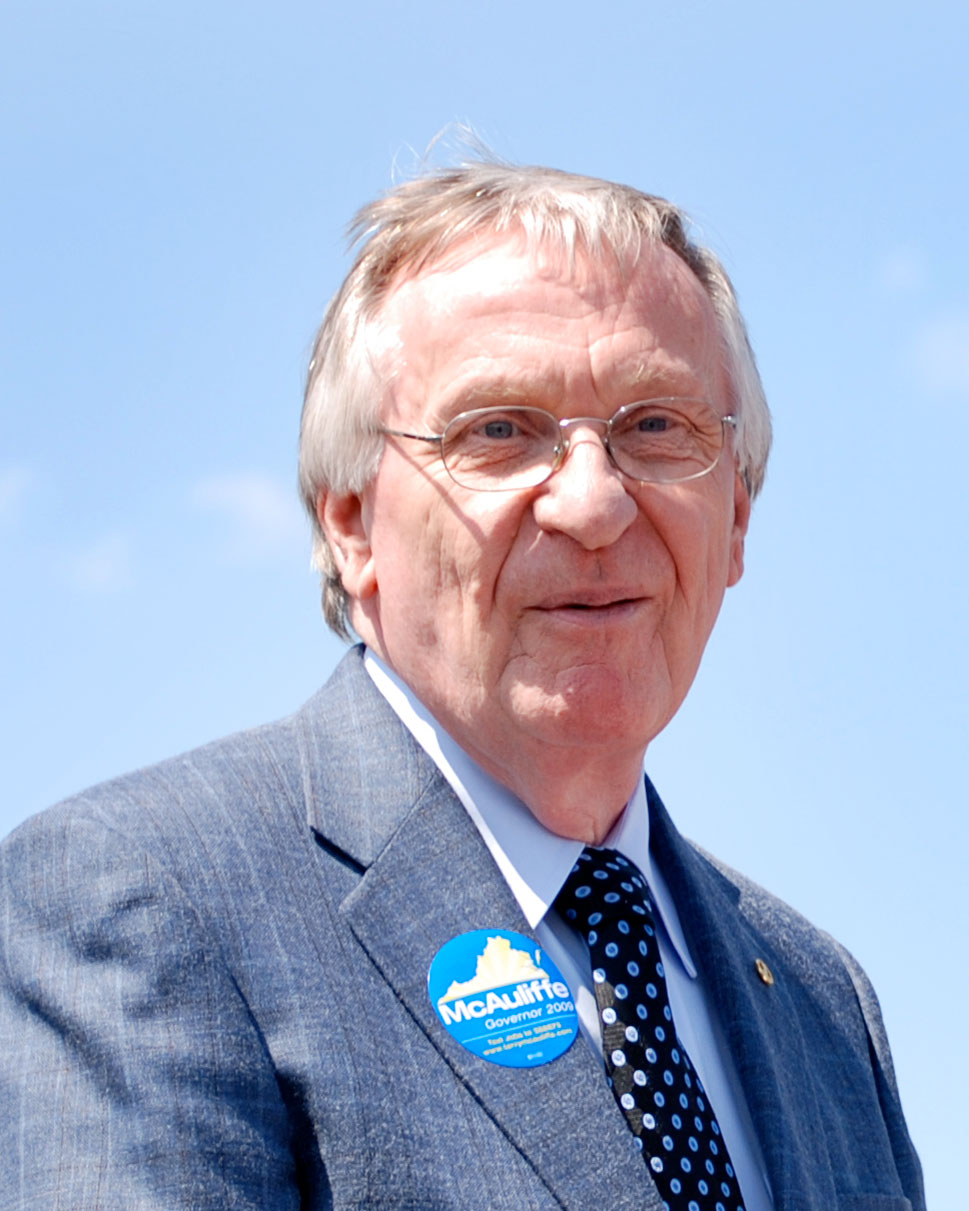
- Plum in 2009

Member of the Virginia House of Delegates
- In office January 13, 1982 – January 10, 2024 Serving with Dorothy McDiarmid and Jack Rust until 1983
- Preceded by: John Buckley
- Succeeded by: Karen Keys-Gamarra
- Constituency: 50th district (1982‍–‍1983); 36th district (1983‍–‍2024)
- In office January 11, 1978 – January 9, 1980 Serving with Vince Callahan, Dorothy McDiarmid, Ray Vickery, and Martin Perper
- Preceded by: Carrington Williams
- Succeeded by: Jack Rust
- Constituency: 18th district

Chair of the Democratic Party of Virginia
- In office March 7, 1998 – December 2, 2000
- Preceded by: Suzie Wrenn
- Succeeded by: Emily Couric (General Chair); Larry Framme (State Chair)

Personal details
- Born: Kenneth Ray Plum; November 3, 1941 (age 84) Shenandoah, Virginia, U.S.
- Party: Democratic
- Spouse: Jane Meacham
- Education: Old Dominion University (BA); University of Virginia (MEd)
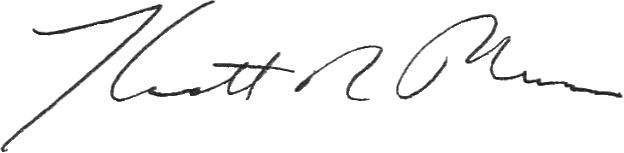
- Signature

Kenneth Ray Plum (born November 3, 1941) is an American politician and former Democratic member of the Virginia House of Delegates, representing the 36th District from 1982 to 2024. He earlier served from 1978 through 1980. His district included a large part of Fairfax County, including the entirety of Reston.

Plum was selected as chair of the House Democratic caucus on January 14, 2009. He was previously a chair of the Democratic Party of Virginia. He currently serves as Caucus Chair Emeritus. He also serves as the Chair of the Agriculture, Chesapeake and Natural Resources Committee.

== Electoral history ==
Virginia House of Delegates, District 36: Results 1995 to 2021
Year	Democrat	Votes	Pct	Republican	Votes	Pct	Third Party	Party	Votes	Pct
1995	Ken Plum	10,353	65%	Dan McGuire	5,532	35%				
1997	Ken Plum	11,924	58%	Dan McGuire		37%	Gary Alexander	Independent	981	5%
1999	Ken Plum	10,430	62%	M.N. Pocalyko	5,975	35%	P.L. Thomas	Independent	463	3%
2001	Ken Plum	16,424	99%	no candidate			Write-ins		201	1%
2003	Ken Plum	11,803	98%	no candidate			Write-ins		186	2%
2005	Ken Plum	16,310	79%	no candidate			D. E. Ferguson	Libertarian	4,166	20%
2007	Ken Plum	12,101	98%	no candidate			Write-ins		302	2%
2009	Ken Plum	12,893	60%	Hugh M. Cannon	8,581	40%				
2011	Ken Plum	9,522	64%	Hugh M. Cannon	5,327	36%				
2021	Ken Plum	25,701	71.5%	Matt Lang	10,220	28.5%				

Party political offices
Preceded by Suzie Wrenn	Chair of the Virginia Democratic Party; 1998–2000	Succeeded by Emily Couric as General Chair of the Virginia Democratic Party
Preceded by Suzie Wrenn	Chair of the Virginia Democratic Party; 1998–2000	Succeeded by Larry Framme as State Chair of the Virginia Democratic Party
