= Joseph T. Fitzpatrick =

American politician

Member of the Virginia Senate from the 5th district
- In office January 14, 1976 – January 1, 1982
- Preceded by: Thomas R. McNamara
- Succeeded by: Evelyn Momsen Hailey

Chair of the Democratic Party of Virginia
- In office 1972–1979
- Preceded by: William G. Thomas
- Succeeded by: Richard J. Davis

Personal details
- Born: Joseph Thomas Fitzpatrick; June 1, 1929 Norfolk, Virginia, U.S.
- Died: July 12, 2006 (aged 77) Norfolk, Virginia, U.S.
- Party: Democratic
- Spouse: Angeline Venuto

Joseph Thomas Fitzpatrick (June 1, 1929 – July 12, 2006) was an American politician.

Asked to be part of the Robert F Kennedy 1968 Presidential campaign. Primarily to assist the RFK Presidential campaign throughout the southern states.

== Early life ==
Fitzpatrick was born in Norfolk, Virginia, in the neighborhood of Ocean View. Fitzpatrick was a high school basketball coach and was involved with the banking business. He was also Royster Fertilizer Company’s Traffic Manager for 15 years.

== Political career ==
He was a member of the Democratic Party and was elected Chairman of the Democratic Party of Virginia. He was involved with the 1960 presidential campaign of John F. Kennedy and the 1968 presidential campaign of Robert F. Kennedy.

Fitzpatrick served in the Virginia Senate from 1976 to 1981 and served as city treasurer of Norfolk, Virginia from 1981 to 2001. From 1992 to 2000, he served as vice president of the St. Mary's Cemetery board.

Fitzpatrick died in Norfolk, Virginia. He was survived by his three daughters and six grandchildren.
