= Mark Warner =

American politician (born 1954)

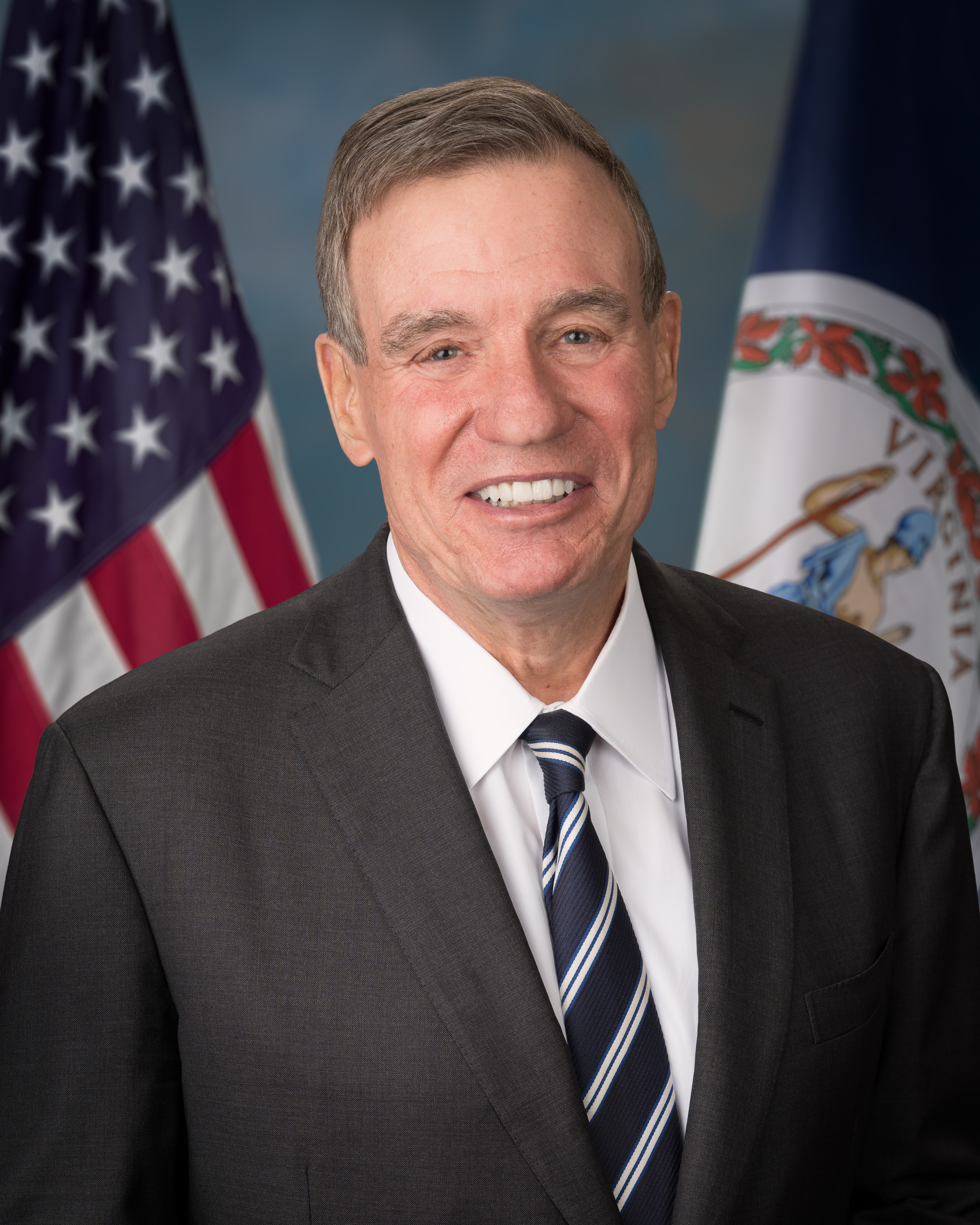
- Official portrait, 2025

United States Senator from Virginia
- Incumbent
- Assumed office January 3, 2009 Serving with Tim Kaine
- Preceded by: John Warner
Senate positions
Vice Chair of the Senate Intelligence Committee
Incumbent
Assumed office January 3, 2025
Preceded by	Marco Rubio
In office January 3, 2017 – February 3, 2021
Preceded by	Dianne Feinstein
Succeeded by	Marco Rubio
Chair of the Senate Intelligence Committee
In office February 3, 2021 – January 3, 2025
Preceded by	Marco Rubio (acting)
Succeeded by	Tom Cotton
Vice Chair of the Senate Democratic Caucus
Incumbent
Assumed office January 3, 2017 Serving with Elizabeth Warren
Leader	Chuck Schumer
Preceded by	Chuck Schumer

Chair of the National Governors Association
- In office July 20, 2004 – July 18, 2005
- Preceded by: Dirk Kempthorne
- Succeeded by: Mike Huckabee

69th Governor of Virginia
- In office January 12, 2002 – January 14, 2006
- Lieutenant: Tim Kaine
- Preceded by: Jim Gilmore
- Succeeded by: Tim Kaine

Chair of the Democratic Party of Virginia
- In office May 4, 1993 – September 18, 1995
- Preceded by: Paul Goldman
- Succeeded by: Suzie Wrenn

Personal details
- Born: Mark Robert Warner; December 15, 1954 (age 71) Indianapolis, Indiana, U.S.
- Party: Democratic
- Spouse: Lisa Collis (m. 1989)
- Children: 3 (Note: One child is deceased.)
- Education: George Washington University (BA); Harvard University (JD)
- Website: Senate website Campaign website
- Mark Warner's voice Warner supporting Avril Haines's confirmation as Director of National Intelligence; Recorded January 20, 2021

Mark Robert Warner (born December 15, 1954) is an American politician and businessman serving as the senior United States senator from Virginia, a seat he has held since 2009. A member of the Democratic Party, Warner served from 2002 to 2006 as the 69th governor of Virginia. He is vice chair of the Senate Democratic Caucus and vice chair of the Senate Intelligence Committee.

Warner was widely expected to pursue the Democratic nomination in the 2008 United States presidential election, but he announced in October 2006 that he would not run, citing a desire not to disrupt his family life. Warner delivered the keynote address at the 2008 Democratic National Convention, and was considered to be a potential vice presidential candidate until he took himself out of consideration after winning the Democratic nomination for the U.S. Senate.

Warner was elected to the Senate in 2008 and reelected in 2014, 2020, and 2026. He became Virginia's senior senator in 2013, when Senator Jim Webb retired. He is the honorary chairman of Forward Together PAC.

Before entering politics, Warner became involved in telecommunications-related venture capital during the 1980s. He founded and led the Columbia Capital firm. He also co-founded Capital Cellular Corporation. With a net worth of $214.1 million, Warner is the seventh-wealthiest member of Congress and its wealthiest Democrat.

== Early life and education ==
Warner was born in Indianapolis, Indiana, the son of Marjorie (née Johnston) and Robert F. Warner. He has a younger sister, Lisa. He grew up in Illinois, and later in Vernon, Connecticut, where he graduated from Rockville High School, a public secondary school. He has credited his interest in politics to his eighth grade social studies teacher, Jim Tyler, who "inspired him to work for social and political change during the tumultuous year of 1968." He was class president at Rockville High School and hosted a weekly pick-up basketball game at his house, "a tradition that continues today."

Warner graduated from George Washington University, earning his Bachelor of Arts degree in political science in 1977. He was inducted into Phi Beta Kappa and graduated valedictorian, with a 4.0 grade point average. Warner was the first in his family to graduate from college. GWU later initiated him into Omicron Delta Kappa, the National Leadership Honor Society, as an alumnus member in 1995. While at George Washington University, he worked on Capitol Hill to pay for his tuition, riding his bike early mornings to the office of U.S. Senator Abraham Ribicoff. His sophomore year, Warner took time off from school to serve as the youth coordinator on Ella Grasso's successful gubernatorial bid in Connecticut. Upon returning to Washington, Warner took a part-time job in the office of then-Representative Chris Dodd. He went on to serve as Dodd's senatorial campaign manager during his freshman year of law school. When his parents visited him at college, he got two tickets for them to tour the White House; when his father asked him why he didn't get a ticket for himself, he replied, "I'll see the White House when I'm president."

Warner then graduated from Harvard Law School with a Juris Doctor in 1980 and coached the law school's first intramural women's basketball team. Warner then took a job raising money for the Democratic Party based in Atlanta from 1980 to 1982. Warner has never practiced law.

== Early career ==
Warner founded two ultimately unsuccessful businesses before becoming a general contractor for cellular businesses and investors. As founder and managing director of Columbia Capital, a venture capital firm, he helped found or was an early investor in a number of technology companies, including Nextel. He co-founded Capital Cellular Corporation in 1989, using his knowledge of federal telecommunications law to trade pieces of cellular spectrum, and built up an estimated net worth of more than $215 million. As of 2025, he is the fourth wealthiest U.S. senator.

=== State activism ===
Warner involved himself in public efforts related to health care, transportation, telecommunications, information technology and education. He managed Douglas Wilder's successful 1989 gubernatorial campaign and served as chairman of the state Democratic Party from 1993 to 1995. Warner also served, in the early 1990s, on the Virginia Commonwealth Transportation Board and sat in on monthly committee meetings of the Rail and Public Transportation Division (headed by Robert G. Corder).

=== 1996 U.S. Senate election ===
He unsuccessfully ran for the U.S. Senate in 1996 against incumbent Republican John Warner (no relation) in a "Warner versus Warner" election. Mark Warner performed strongly in the state's rural areas, making the contest much closer than many pundits expected. He lost to the incumbent, 52% to 47%, losing most parts of the state including the north.

== Governor of Virginia ==
=== 2001 election ===
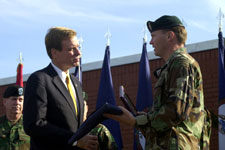
Then-Gov. Mark Warner as the state commander in chief of the Virginia Army National Guard and Virginia Air National Guard

In 2001, Warner campaigned for governor as a moderate Democrat after years of slowly building up a power base in rural Virginia, particularly Southwest Virginia. His opponents were Republican Mark Earley, the state's attorney general, and the Libertarian candidate William B. Redpath. Warner won with 52.16 percent of the votes, 96,943 votes ahead of the next opponent. Warner had a significant funding advantage, spending $20 million compared with Earley's $10 million.

=== Tenure ===
After he was elected in 2002, Warner drew upon a $900 million "rainy day fund" left by his predecessor, Jim Gilmore. Warner campaigned in favor of two regional sales tax increases, especially in Northern Virginia and Hampton Roads, to fund transportation. Virginians rejected both regional referendums to raise the sales tax.

In 2004, Warner worked with Democratic and moderate Republican legislators and the business community to reform the tax code, lowering food and some income taxes while increasing the sales and cigarette taxes. His tax package effected a net tax increase of approximately $1.5 billion annually. Warner credited the additional revenues with saving the state's AAA bond rating, held at the time by only five other states, and allowing the single largest investment in K-12 education in Virginia history. Warner also entered into an agreement with Democrats and moderate Republicans in the Virginia Senate to cap state car tax reimbursements to local governments.

During his tenure as governor, Warner influenced the world of college athletics. "Warner used his power as Virginia's governor in 2003 to pressure the Atlantic Coast Conference into revoking an invitation it had already extended to Syracuse University. Warner wanted the conference, which already included the University of Virginia, to add Virginia Tech instead — and he got his way."

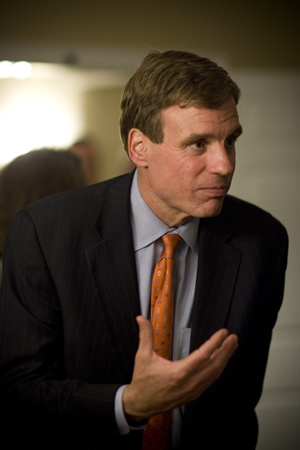
Warner speaking in Philadelphia, May 2006

Warner's popularity may have helped Democrats gain seats in the Virginia House of Delegates in 2003 and again in 2005, reducing the majorities built up by Republicans in the 1990s. Warner chaired the National Governors Association in 2004-2005 and led a national high school reform movement. He chaired the Southern Governors' Association and was a member of the Democratic Governors Association. In January 2005, a two-year study, the Government Performance Project, in conjunction with Governing magazine and the Pew Charitable Trust graded each state in four management categories: money, people, infrastructure and information. Virginia and Utah received the highest ratings average with both states receiving an A− rating overall, prompting Warner to dub Virginia "the best managed state in the nation."

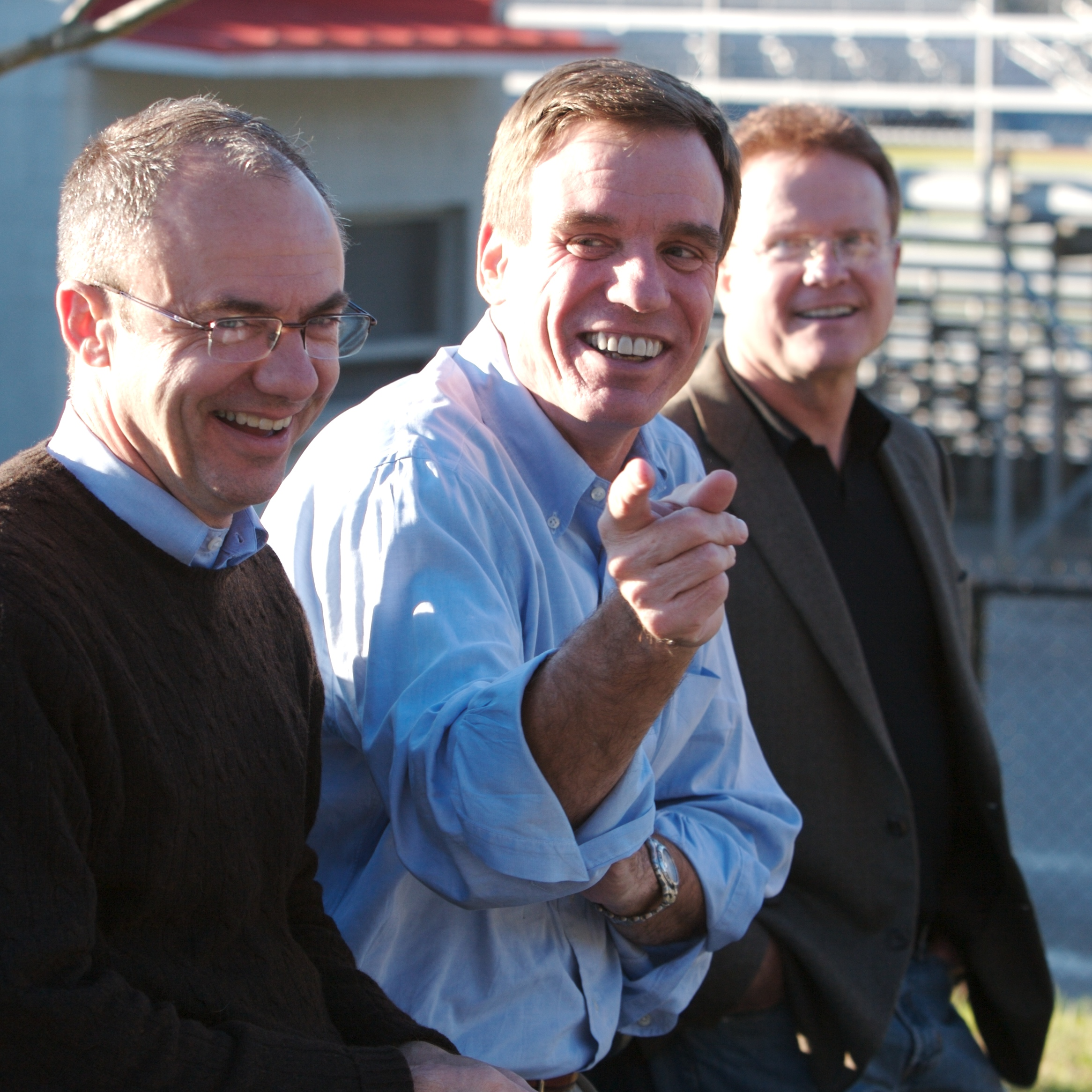
Warner with Virginia House of Delegates minority leader Ward Armstrong (left) and then-U.S. Senator Jim Webb (right), November 4, 2007

The Virginia Constitution forbids any governor from serving consecutive terms, so Warner could not run for reelection in 2005. The 2005 Virginia gubernatorial election became a contest between two other statewide figures who had served alongside Warner, Lieutenant Governor and former Richmond Mayor Tim Kaine, and Attorney General and former Virginia Secretary of Public Safety Jerry Kilgore. Warner supported and campaigned for Kaine, a Democrat, against Kilgore, a Republican.

On November 8, Kaine was elected governor with 52% of the vote. Kilgore received 46%, and Russ Potts, a moderate Republican state senator who ran as an independent, 2%. Many national pundits considered Kaine's victory further evidence of Warner's political clout in Virginia.

On November 29, 2005, Warner commuted the death sentence of Robin Lovitt to life imprisonment without the possibility of parole. Lovitt was convicted of murdering Clayton Dicks at an Arlington pool hall in 1999. After his trial in 2001, Lovitt's lawyers stated that a court clerk illegally destroyed evidence that was used against Lovitt during his trial, but that could have possibly exonerated him upon further DNA testing. Lovitt's death sentence would have been the 1,000th carried out in the United States since the Supreme Court reinstated capital punishment as permissible under the Eighth Amendment to the Constitution in 1976. In a statement, Warner said, "The actions of an agent of the commonwealth, in a manner contrary to the express direction of the law, comes at the expense of a defendant facing society's most severe and final sanction." Warner denied clemency in 11 other death penalty cases that came before him as governor.

Warner also arranged for DNA tests of evidence left from the case of Roger Keith Coleman, who was put to death by the state in 1992. Coleman was convicted in the 1981 rape and stabbing death of his 19-year-old sister-in-law, Wanda McCoy. Coleman drew national attention, even making the cover of Time, by repeatedly claiming innocence and protesting the unfairness of the death penalty. DNA results announced on January 12, 2006, confirmed Coleman's guilt.

In July 2005, his approval ratings were at 74% and in some polls reached 80%. Warner left office with a 71% approval rating in one poll.

== U.S. Senate ==
=== Elections ===
==== 2008 ====
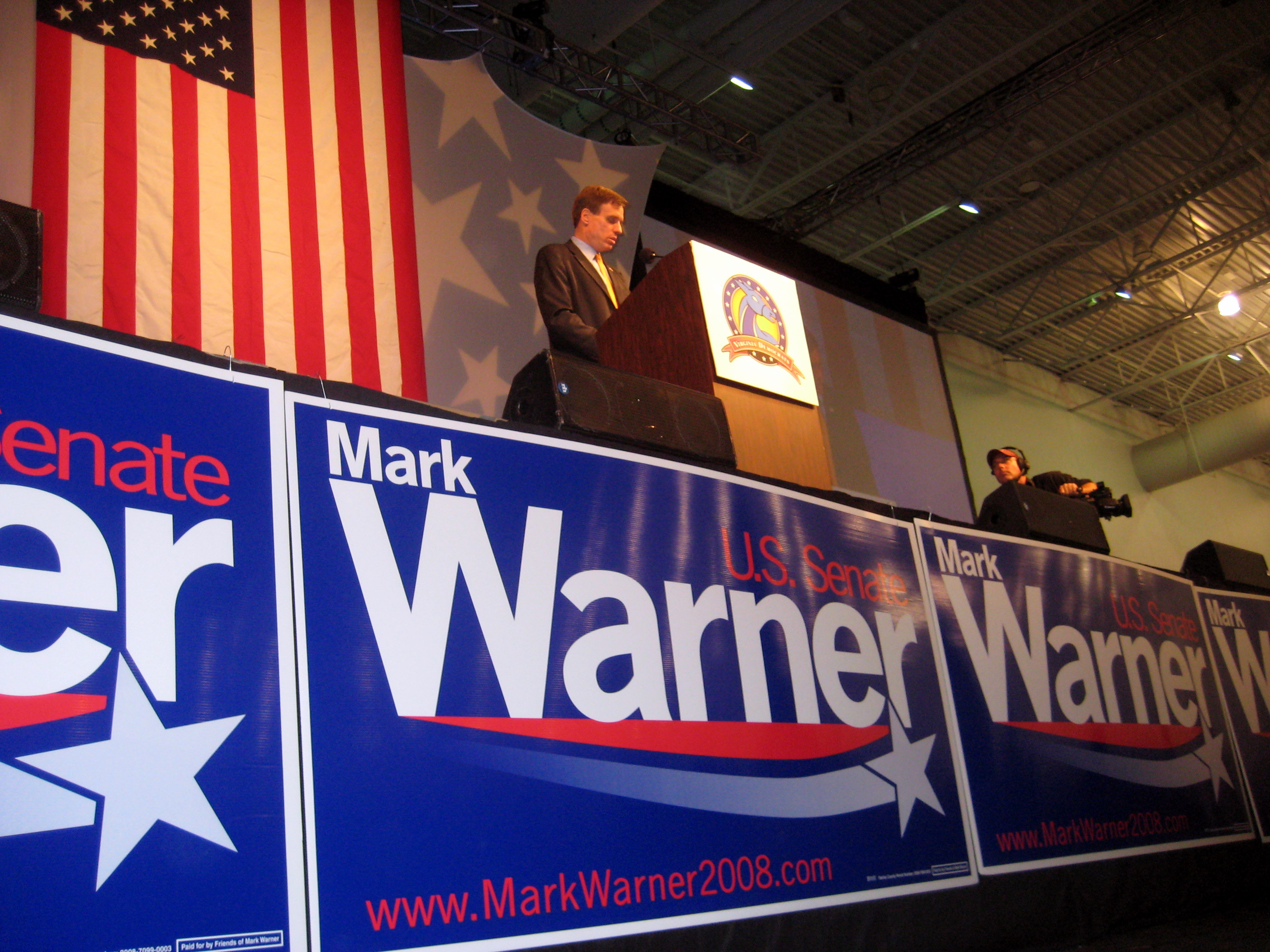
Warner accepts the nomination as the Democratic candidate for the Senate.

Warner was believed to be preparing to run for the Democratic nomination for president in 2008, and had "done everything but announce his candidacy" before suddenly announcing in October 2006 he would not run for president, citing family reasons. On September 13, 2007, he announced that he would run for the U.S. Senate seat being vacated by the retiring John Warner (no relation) in 2008.

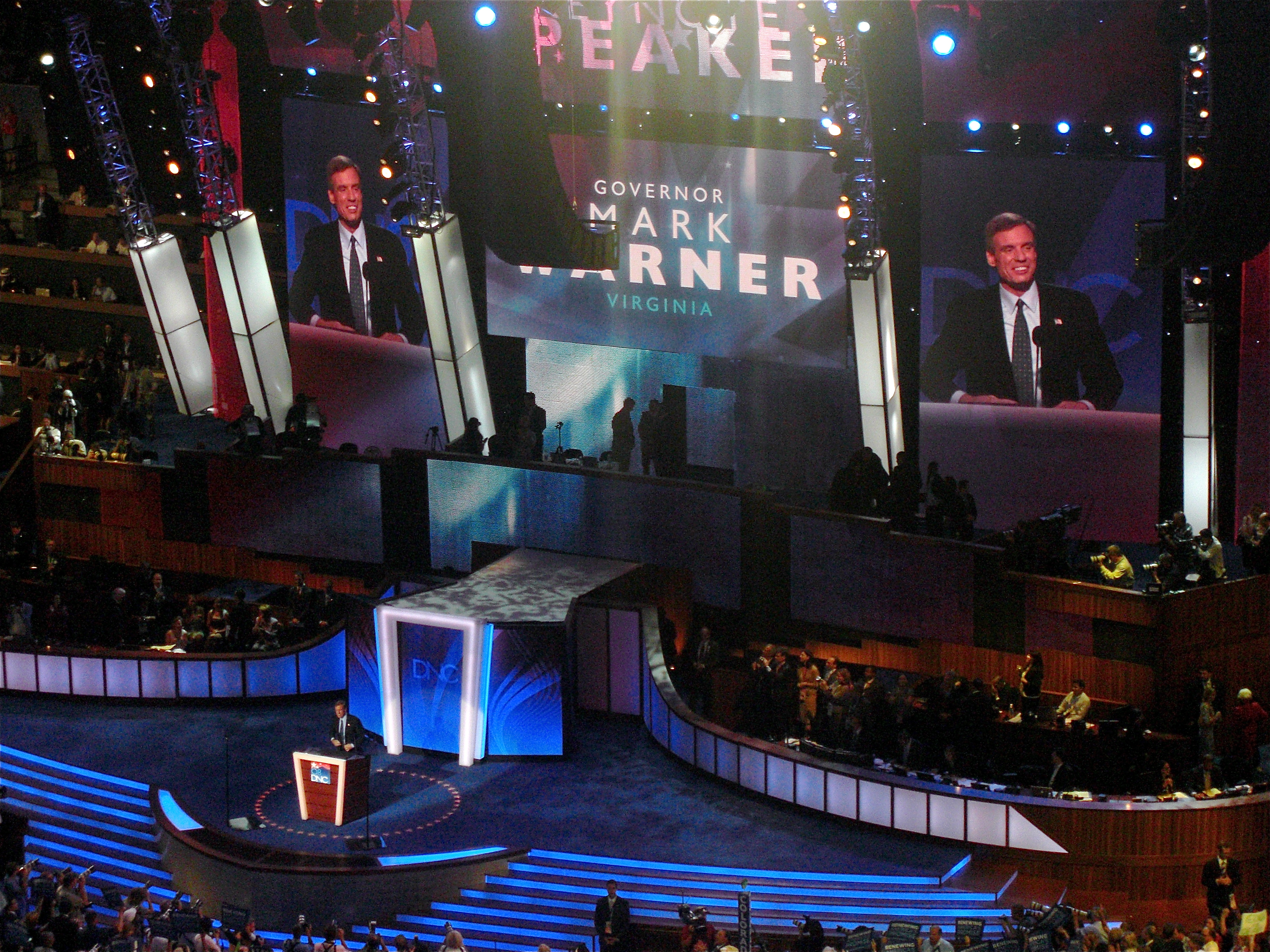
Warner delivers the keynote address during the second day of the 2008 Democratic National Convention in Denver, Colorado.

Warner immediately gained the endorsement of most national Democrats. He held a wide lead over his Republican opponent, fellow former Virginia governor Jim Gilmore (and Warner's predecessor), for virtually the entire campaign. Warner delivered the keynote address at the 2008 Democratic National Convention.

In a Washington Post/ABC News Poll dated September 24, 2008, Warner held a 30-point lead over Gilmore.

In the November election, Warner defeated Gilmore with 65% of the vote to Gilmore's 34%. He carried all but four counties in the state—Rockingham, Augusta, Powhatan and Hanover. In many cases, he ran up huge margins in areas of the state that had traditionally voted Republican. This was the most lopsided margin for a contested Senate race in Virginia since Chuck Robb took 72% of the vote in 1988. As a result of Warner's victory, Virginia had two Democratic U.S. senators for the first time since Harry Byrd, Jr. left the Democrats to become an independent (while still caucusing with the Democrats) in 1970.

==== 2014 ====
In 2014, Warner faced Ed Gillespie, who had previously served as Counselor to the President under George W. Bush and chairman of the Republican National Committee. Warner's margin of victory—only 17,727 votes—was much narrower than expected.

==== 2020 ====
In 2020, Warner defeated Republican nominee Daniel Gade, a college professor and U.S. Army veteran, with 56% of the vote to Gade's 44%.

==== 2026 ====
On December 2, 2025, Warner announced he would seek reelection to a fourth term. He was reelected, defeating Republican nominee Bert Mizusawa. Warner stated he would not run for another term after his successful reelection bid in 2026.

=== Tenure ===
Upon arriving in the U.S. Senate in 2009, Warner was appointed to the Senate's Banking, Budget, and Commerce committees. Warner was later named to the Senate Intelligence Committee in 2011.

In 2009, Warner voted for the American Recovery and Reinvestment Act, the stimulus bill. As a member of the Budget Committee, he submitted an amendment designed to help the government track how the stimulus dollars were being spent.

In 2010, Warner, Senator Lamar Alexander, and Representatives Tom Petri and David Price requested that the American Academy of Arts and Sciences form The Commission on the Humanities and Social Sciences.

When offered the chair of the Democratic Senatorial Campaign Committee in preparation for the 2012 election cycle, Warner declined because he wanted to keep a distance from the partisanship of the role.

In the fall of 2012, supporters approached Warner about possibly leaving the Senate to seek a second term as Virginia's governor. After considering the prospect, Warner announced shortly after the November 2012 elections that he had chosen to remain in the Senate because he was "all in" on finding a bipartisan solution to the country's fiscal challenges.

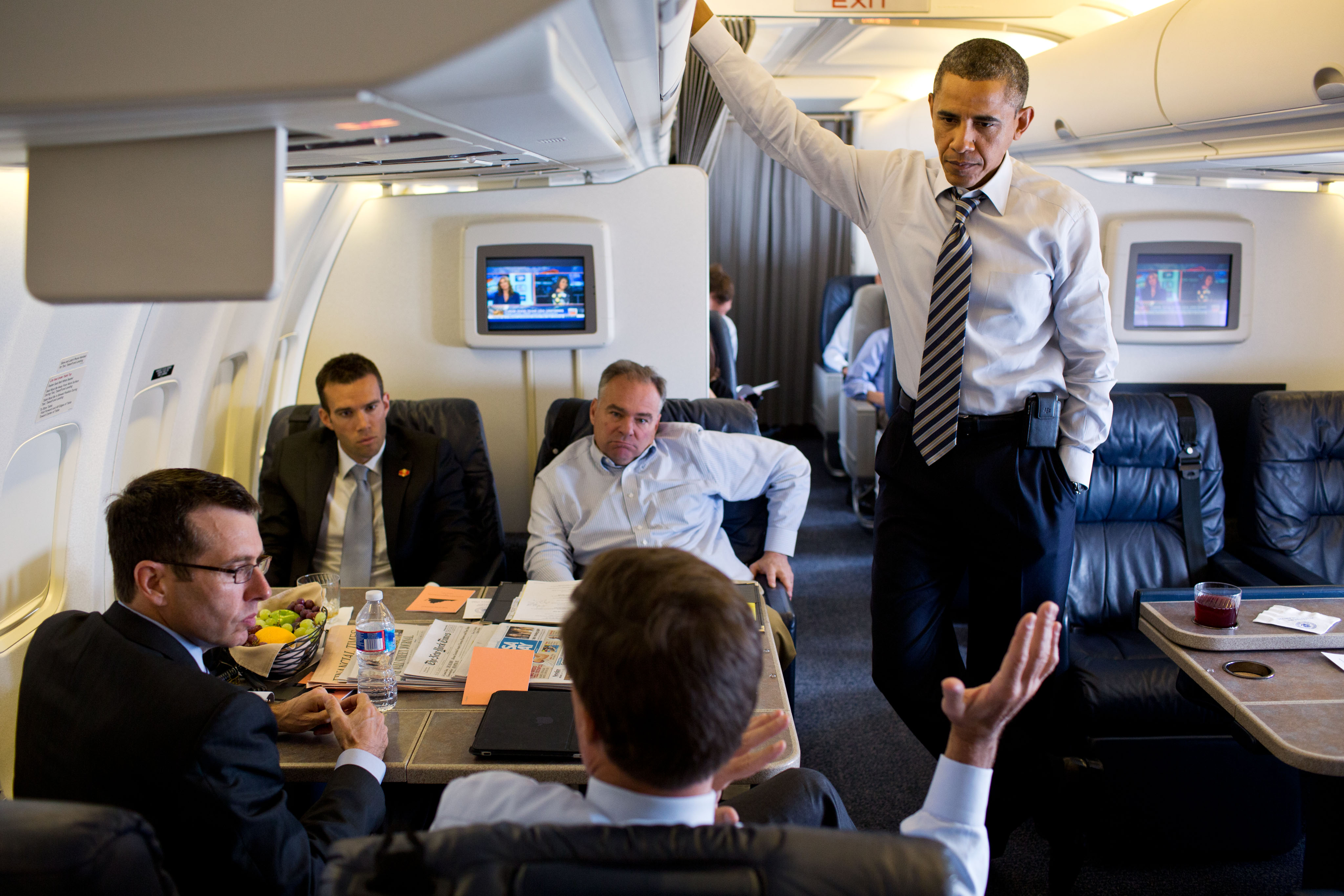
President Barack Obama and Tim Kaine listen to Senator Warner, aboard Air Force One, July 13, 2012.

Warner became the senior senator on January 3, 2013, when Jim Webb left the Senate and was replaced by Tim Kaine, who was lieutenant governor while Warner was governor.

In October 2014, Warner was implicated in a federal investigation of the 2014 resignation of Virginia State Senator Phillip Puckett. He was alleged to have "discussed the possibility of several jobs, including a federal judgeship, for the senator's daughter in an effort to dissuade him from quitting the evenly divided state Senate." A Warner spokesman acknowledged that the conversation occurred, but said Warner made no "explicit" job offer and that he and Puckett were simply "brainstorming". In January 2015, the Republican Party of Virginia filed a formal complaint against Warner with the United States Senate Select Committee on Ethics, alleging that Warner's interactions with Puckett violated the Honest Leadership and Open Government Act.

Warner has been identified as a radical centrist, working to foster compromise in the Senate. He was ranked the 10th most bipartisan member of the U.S. Senate during the 114th United States Congress in the Bipartisan Index, created by The Lugar Center and the McCourt School of Public Policy to assess congressional bipartisanship. According to the same methodology, Warner was the second most bipartisan Democrat in the 115th United States Congress.

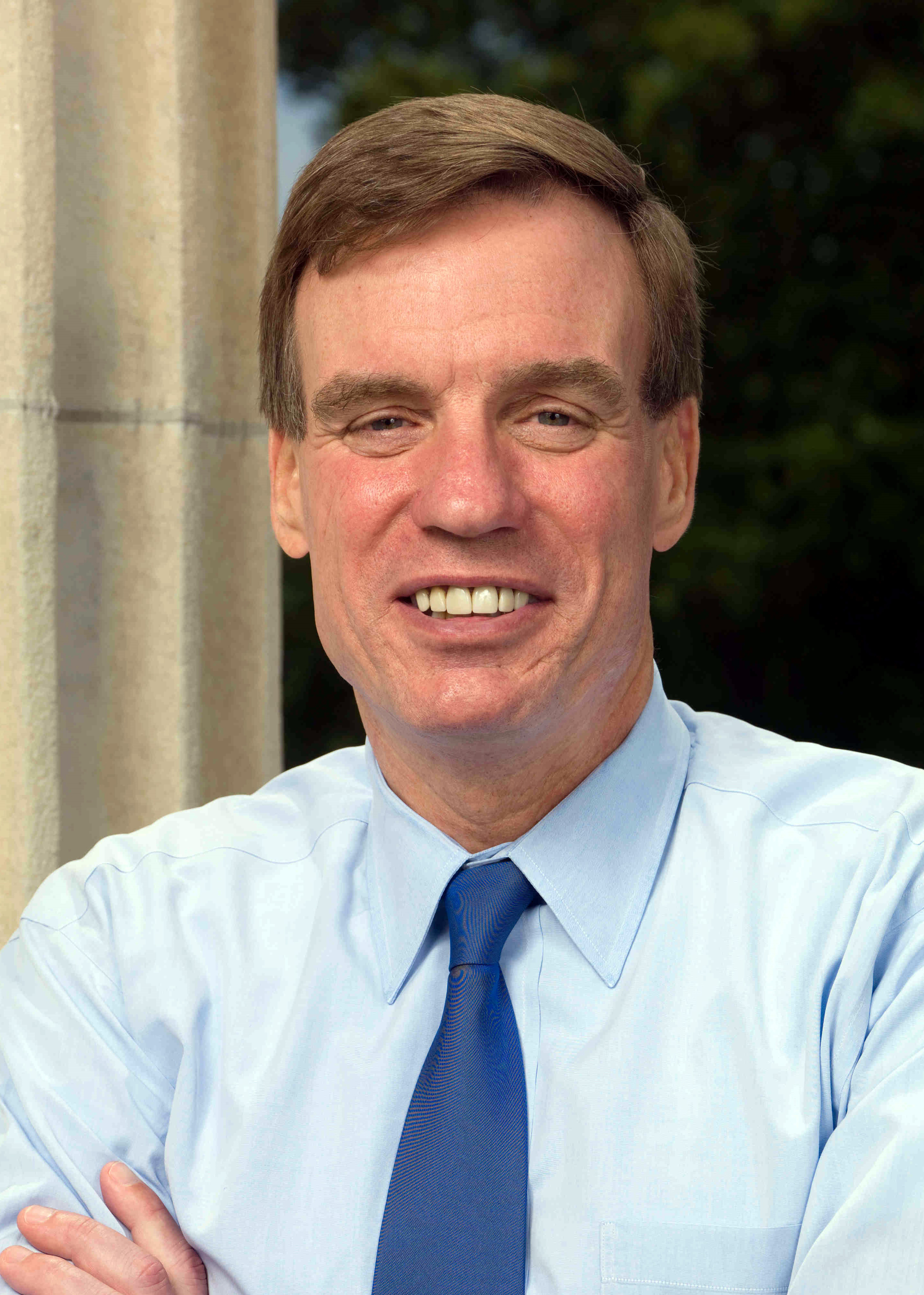
Warner's official portrait, 2010

=== Campaign contributions ===
From 2008 to 2014, Warner's top ten campaign contributors included JP Morgan Chase, the Blackstone Group, and Columbia Capital. BlackRock had never contributed until Warner bought shares in the BlackRock Equity Dividend Fund in 2011.

=== 119th United States Congress Committee assignments ===
- Committee on Banking, Housing, and Urban Affairs
  - Subcommittee on Financial Institutions and Consumer Protection
  - Subcommittee on Securities, Insurance, and Investment (Ranking Member)
  - Subcommittee on Digital Assets
- Committee on the Budget
- Committee on Finance
- Committee on Rules and Administration
- Select Committee on Intelligence (Vice Chairman)
- Joint Committee on the Library

== Political positions ==
=== Abortion ===
Warner is pro-choice and supports Roe v. Wade.

=== Health care ===
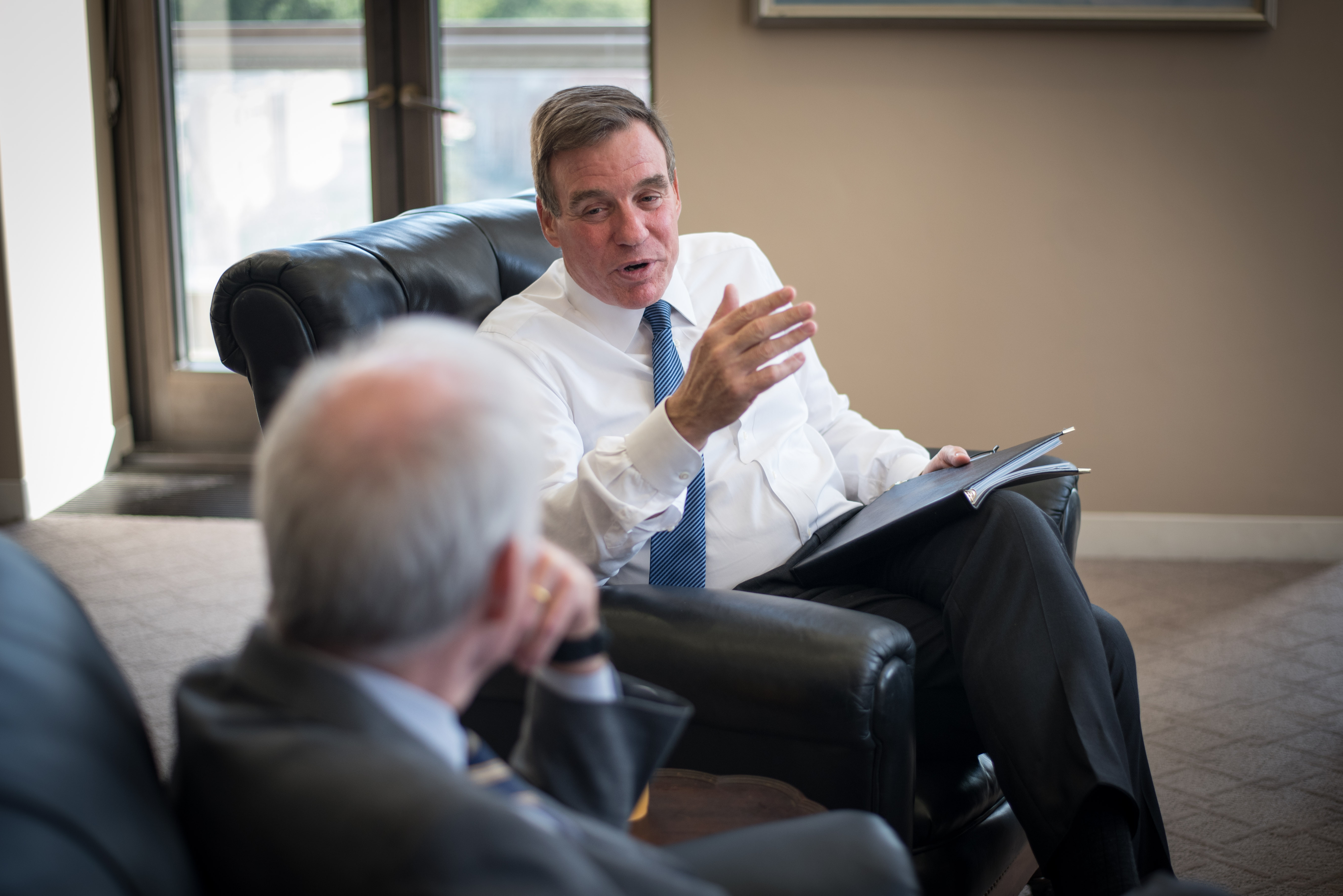
Senator Mark Warner (D-VA) meets with constituents in 2017.

On a video in his Senate office, Warner promised Virginians, "I would not vote for a health-care plan that doesn't let you keep health insurance you like."

He voted for the 2010 Affordable Care Act (ACA), commonly called Obamacare, helping the Senate reach the required sixty votes to prevent it from going to a filibuster. He and 11 Senate freshmen discussed adding an amendment package aimed at addressing health care costs by expanding health IT and wellness prevention.

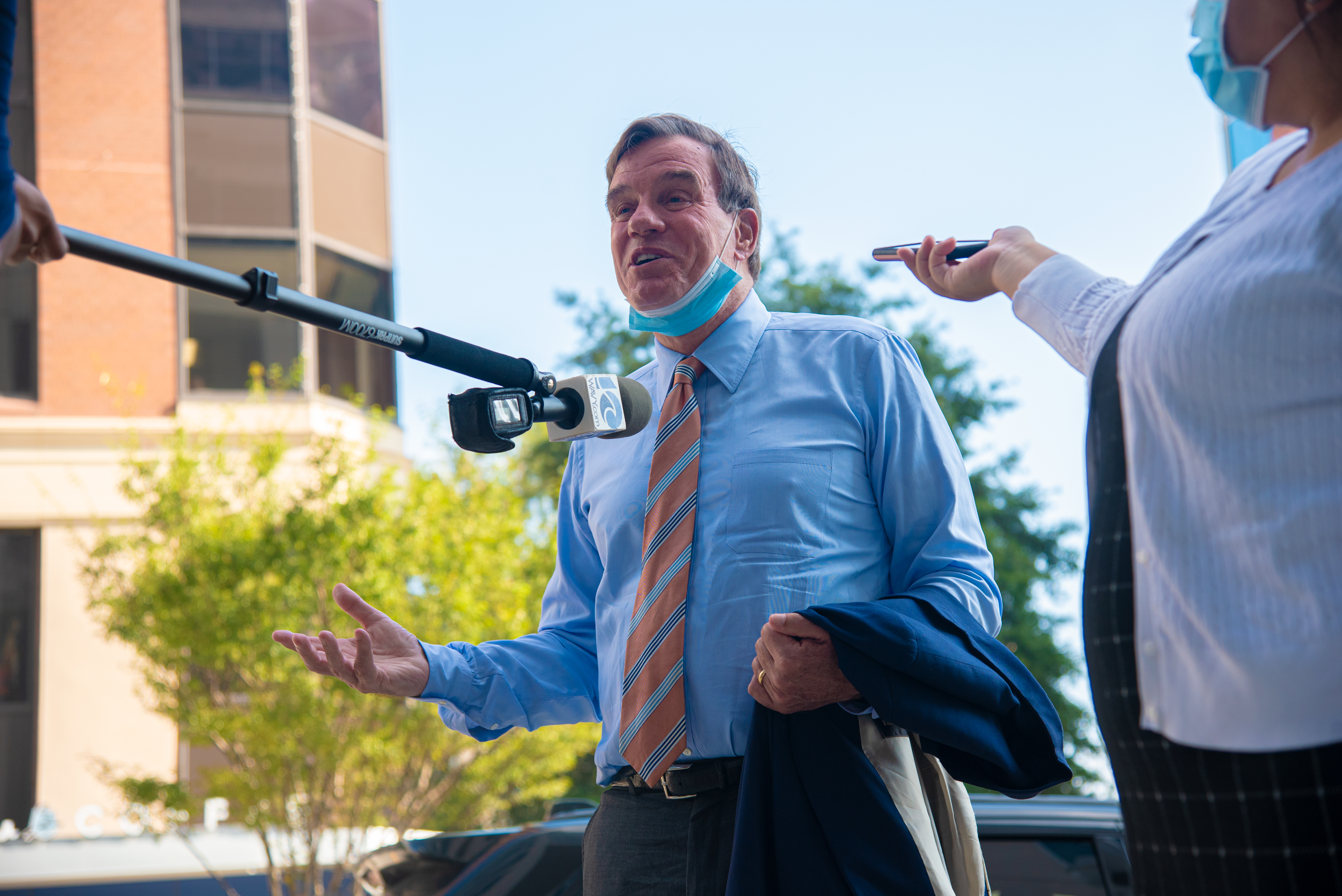
Senator Mark Warner speaks at the September 2020 Hospitality Roundtable.

In January 2019, Warner was one of six Democratic senators to introduce the American Miners Act of 2019, a bill that would amend the Surface Mining Control and Reclamation Act of 1977 to swap funds in excess of the amounts needed to meet existing obligations under the Abandoned Mine Land fund to the 1974 Pension Plan as part of an effort to prevent its insolvency as a result of coal company bankruptcies and the 2008 financial crisis. It also increased the Black Lung Disability Trust Fund tax and ensured that miners affected by the 2018 coal company bankruptcies would not lose their health care.

In September 2019, amid discussions to prevent a government shutdown, Warner was one of six Democratic senators to sign a letter to congressional leadership advocating for the passage of legislation that would permanently fund health care and pension benefits for retired coal miners as "families in Virginia, West Virginia, Wyoming, Alabama, Colorado, North Dakota and New Mexico" would start to receive notifications of health care termination by the end of the following month.

=== Finance ===
From the start of his Senate term, Warner attempted to replicate in Washington, D.C. the bipartisan partnerships that he used effectively during his tenure as Virginia governor. In 2010, Warner worked with a Republican colleague on the Banking Committee, Bob Corker, to write a key portion of the Dodd–Frank Wall Street Reform and Consumer Protection Act that seeks to end taxpayer bailouts of failing Wall Street financial firms by requiring "advance funeral plans" for large financial firms.

In 2013, the Center for the Study of the Presidency and Congress gave Warner and Corker its Publius Award for their bipartisan work on financial reform legislation.

In 2018, Warner became one of the few Democrats in the Senate supporting a bill that would relax "key banking regulations". As part of at least 11 other Democrats, Warner argued that the bill would "right-size post-crisis rules imposed on small and regional lenders and help make it easier for them to provide credit". Chuck Schumer and Elizabeth Warren have stated their opposition to the legislation.

=== Campaign finance ===
In June 2019, Warner and Amy Klobuchar introduced the Preventing Adversaries Internationally from Disbursing Advertising Dollars (PAID AD) Act, a bill that would modify U.S. federal campaign finance laws to outlaw the purchasing of ads that name a political candidate and appear on platforms by foreign nationals in the midst of an election year.

=== Foreign affairs and national security ===
==== Saudi Arabia and Yemen ====
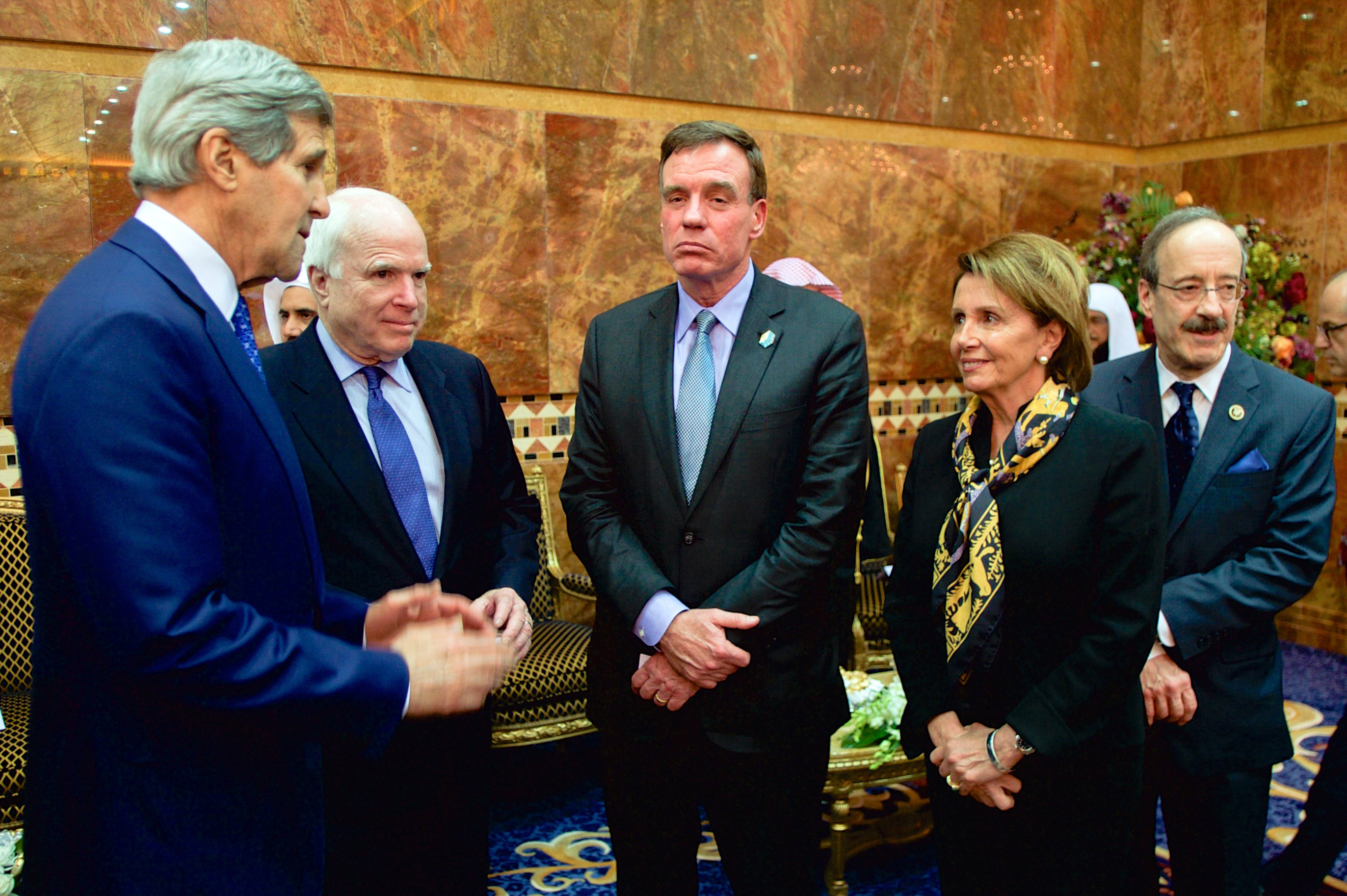
Senator Warner before greeting the new King Salman of Saudi Arabia, Riyadh, Saudi Arabia, January 27, 2015

Warner was the original Democratic sponsor of the Startup Act legislation and has partnered with the bill's original author, Jerry Moran, to introduce three iterations of the bill: Startup Act in 2011, Startup Act 2.0 in 2012 and Startup Act 3.0 in early 2013. Warner has called the legislation the "logical next step" after enactment of the JOBS Act.

In 2015, Warner criticized the Saudi Arabian-led intervention in Yemen, saying: "I'm concerned in particular with some of the indiscriminate bombing in Yemen ... [Gulf states] need to step up and they need to step up with more focus than the kind of indiscriminate bombing."

In June 2017, Warner voted to support Trump's $350 billion arms deal with Saudi Arabia.

==== Israel and Palestine ====
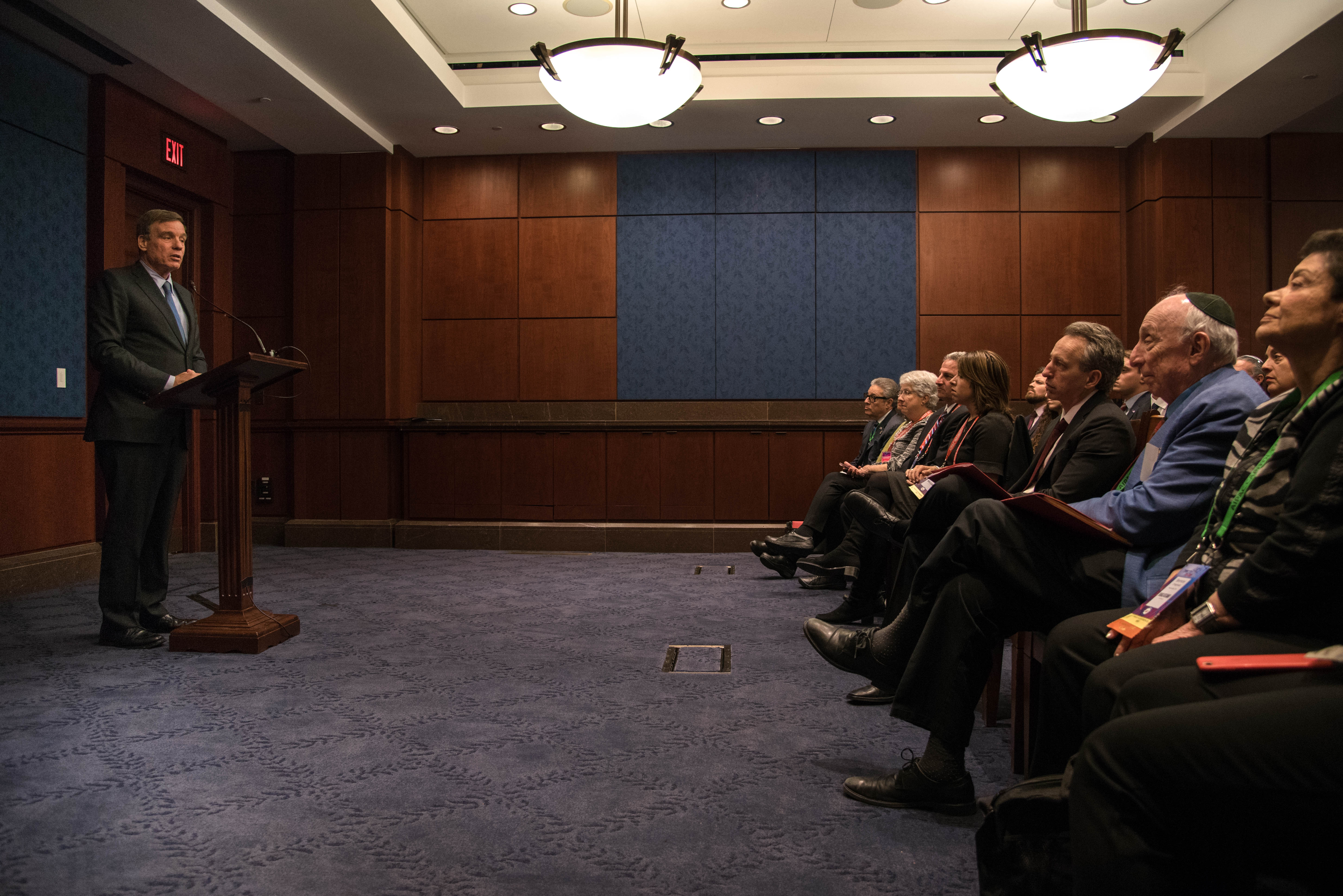
Warner speaks at the 2019 AIPAC Policy Conference in Washington, D.C., on March 26, 2019

In September 2016, in advance of UN Security Council resolution 2334 condemning Israeli settlements in the occupied Palestinian territories, Warner signed an AIPAC-sponsored letter urging President Obama to veto "one-sided" resolutions against Israel.

In December 2017, Warner criticized Donald Trump's decision to recognize Jerusalem as the capital of Israel, saying that it "comes at the wrong time and unnecessarily inflames the region."

In April 2026, Warner joined most Senate Democrats in supporting a resolution to block a sale of bulldozers to Israel, but was one of 11 to oppose another resolution voted on the same day to block another sale to Israel of 1,000-pound bombs.

==== Sanctions on Iran, Russia, and North Korea ====
In July 2017, Warner voted for the Countering America's Adversaries Through Sanctions Act, which grouped together sanctions against Iran, Russia, and North Korea.

==== Central America ====
In April 2019, Warner was one of 34 senators to sign a letter to Trump encouraging him "to listen to members of your own Administration and reverse a decision that will damage our national security and aggravate conditions inside Central America", asserting that Trump had "consistently expressed a flawed understanding of U.S. foreign assistance" since becoming president and that he was "personally undermining efforts to promote U.S. national security and economic prosperity" by preventing the use of Fiscal Year 2018 national security funding. The senators argued that foreign assistance to Central American countries created less migration to the U.S., citing the funding's helping to improve conditions in those countries.

==== Intelligence and counter-intelligence ====
In May 2018, Warner voted for Gina Haspel to be the next CIA director.

In 2016, American foreign policy scholar Stefan Halper served as an FBI operative and contacted members of Trump's 2016 presidential campaign. In May 2018, Warner, the top Democrat on the Senate Intelligence Committee, warned Republican lawmakers that it would be "potentially illegal" to reveal Halper's identity.

Warner welcomed the arrest of WikiLeaks founder Julian Assange, who exposed American war crimes in Iraq and Afghanistan, saying that Assange is "a dedicated accomplice in efforts to undermine American security."

On May 13, 2020, Warner and Joe Manchin were the two Democratic senators to vote against the Lee-Leahy FISA amendment, which strengthened oversight of counterintelligence.

==== Telecommunications and infrastructure security ====
In December 2018, Warner called Chinese telecommunications giant Huawei a threat to U.S. national security.

In February 2019, Warner was one of 11 senators to sign a letter to Energy Secretary Rick Perry and Homeland Security Secretary Kirstjen Nielsen urging them "to work with all federal, state and local regulators, as well as the hundreds of independent power producers and electricity distributors nation-wide to ensure our systems are protected" and affirming that they were "ready and willing to provide any assistance you need to secure our critical electricity infrastructure."

In July 2019, Warner was a cosponsor of the Defending America's 5G Future Act, a bill that would prevent Huawei from being removed from the Commerce Department's "entity list" without an act of Congress and authorize Congress to block administration waivers for U.S. companies to do business with Huawei. The bill would also codify Trump's executive order from the previous May that empowered his administration to block foreign tech companies deemed a national security threat from conducting business in the U.S.

In March 2023, Warner and John Thune led a bipartisan group of 12 senators to introduce the Restricting the Emergence of Security Threats that Risk Information and Communications Technology (RESTRICT) Act, legislation to comprehensively address the ongoing threat posed by technology from foreign adversaries by better empowering the Department of Commerce to review, prevent, and mitigate information communications and technology transactions that pose undue risk to our national security by giving the federal government more control over them. A provision in the legislation could also impose a prison sentence of up to 20 years and a $1 million fine for accessing "banned apps" with a Virtual Private Network (VPN). Warner's dedication to the telecommunications industry was recognized in 2013 as he was inducted into the Wireless Hall of Fame.

In January 2025, Warner co-sponsored the Kids Off Social Media Act (KOSMA), which was introduced by Senators Brian Schatz, Chris Murphy, Ted Cruz, and Katie Britt. Senators Ted Budd, Peter Welch, John Curtis, Angus King, and John Fetterman also co-sponsored the Act, which would set a minimum age of 13 to use social media platforms and prevent social media companies from feeding "algorithmically targeted" content to users under 17.

==== 2026 Iran war ====
On March 1, 2026, after the assassination of Iranian Supreme Leader Ali Khamenei, Warner said he would not "shed any tears" over the loss but criticized the Trump administration for initiating a "war of choice" without evidence of an imminent threat. Warner urged the administration to provide justification to Congress and the public, warning that the strike risked wider conflict in the Middle East.

=== Defense ===
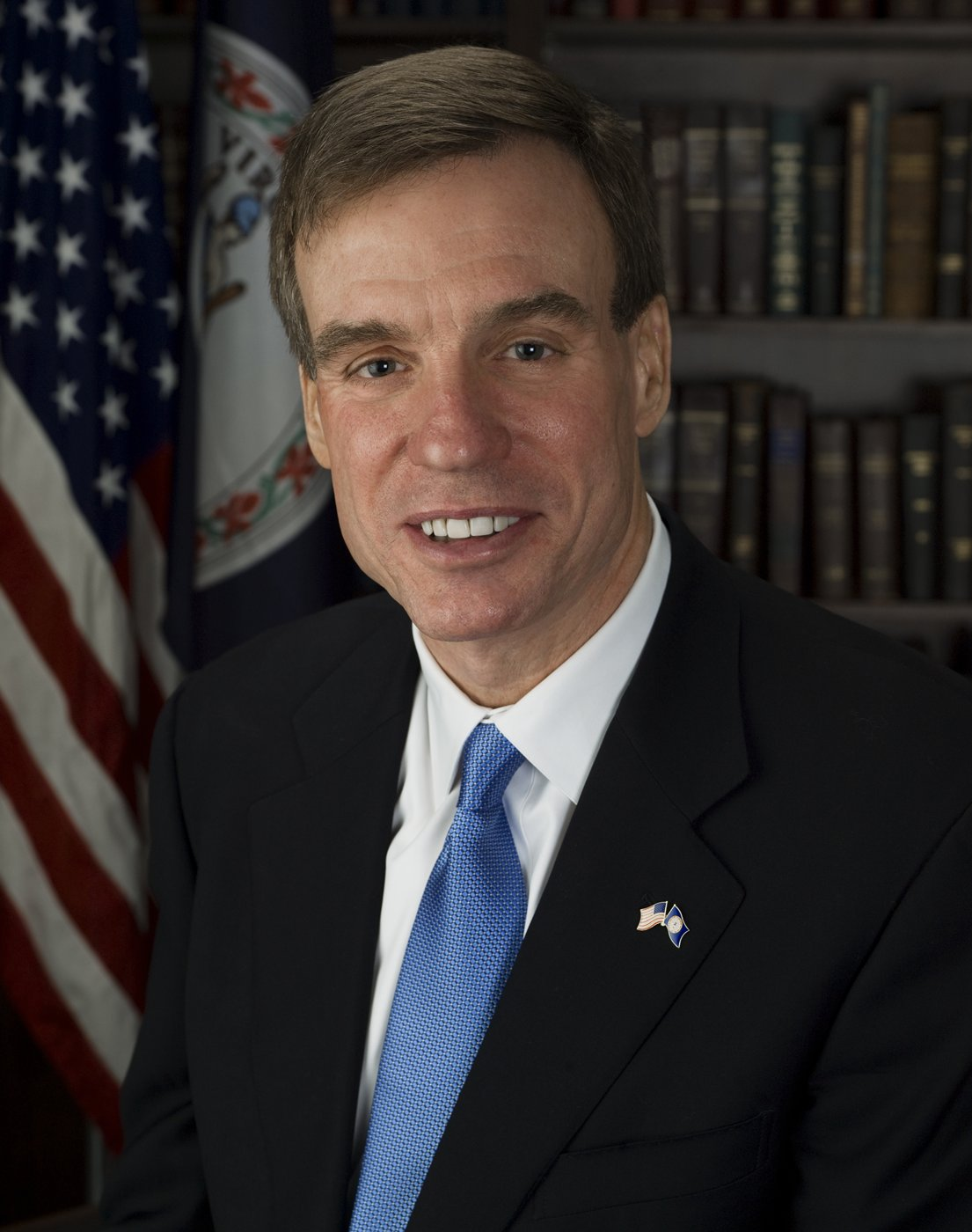
Mark Warner's freshman portrait, 2009

In 2011, Warner voted for the four-year extension of the USA PATRIOT Act. Also in 2011, he engaged Northern Virginia's high-tech community in a pro bono effort to correct burial mistakes and other U.S. Army management deficiencies at Arlington National Cemetery. In 2012, he successfully pushed the Navy to improve the substandard military housing in Hampton Roads.

Also in 2012, Warner pushed the Office of Personnel Management to address chronic backlogs in processing retirement benefits for federal workers, many of whom live in Washington's northern Virginia suburbs. He succeeded in pushing the Department of Veterans Affairs to expand access to PTSD treatment for female military veterans returning from service in Iraq and Afghanistan.

In August 2013, Warner was one of 23 Democratic senators to sign a letter to the Defense Department warning that some payday lenders offer "predatory loan products to service members at exorbitant triple digit effective interest rates and loan products that do not include the additional protections envisioned by the law" and asserting that service members and their families "deserve the strongest possible protections and swift action to ensure that all forms of credit offered to members of our armed forces are safe and sound."

U.S. Secretary of the Navy Ray Mabus awarded Warner the Distinguished Public Service Medal, the Navy's highest honor for a civilian, for his consistent support of Virginia's military families and veterans.

=== Economy ===
Between 2010 and 2013, Warner invested considerable time and effort in leading the Senate's Gang of Six, along with Saxby Chambliss. Chambliss and Warner sought to craft a bipartisan plan along the lines of the Simpson-Bowles Commission to address U.S. deficits and debt.

Although the Gang of Six ultimately failed to produce a legislative "grand bargain", they did agree on the broad outlines of a plan that included spending cuts, tax reforms that produced more revenue, and reforms to entitlement programs like Medicare and Social Security—entitlement reforms that are opposed by most Democrats. Although President Obama showed interest in the plan, leaders in Congress from both parties kept a deal from being made. In 2011, the bipartisan Concord Coalition awarded Warner and Chambliss its Economic Patriots Award for their work with the Gang of Six.

=== Gun laws ===
On April 17, 2013, Warner voted to expand background checks for gun purchases as part of the Manchin-Toomey Amendment. He also voted against the 2013 Assault Weapons Ban, but changed his position in a 2018 op-ed and has co-sponsored similar efforts since then.

In 2017, Warner called himself a strong supporter of Second Amendment rights and vowed to advocate for responsible gun ownership for hunting, recreation, and self-defense.

In January 2019, Warner was one of 40 senators to introduce the Background Check Expansion Act, a bill that would require background checks for either the sale or transfer of all firearms including all unlicensed sellers. Exceptions to the bill's background check requirement included transfers between members of law enforcement, loans for hunting or sporting events on a temporary basis, gifts to members of one's immediate family, transfers as part of an inheritance, and giving a firearm to another person temporarily for immediate self-defense.

=== Immigration ===
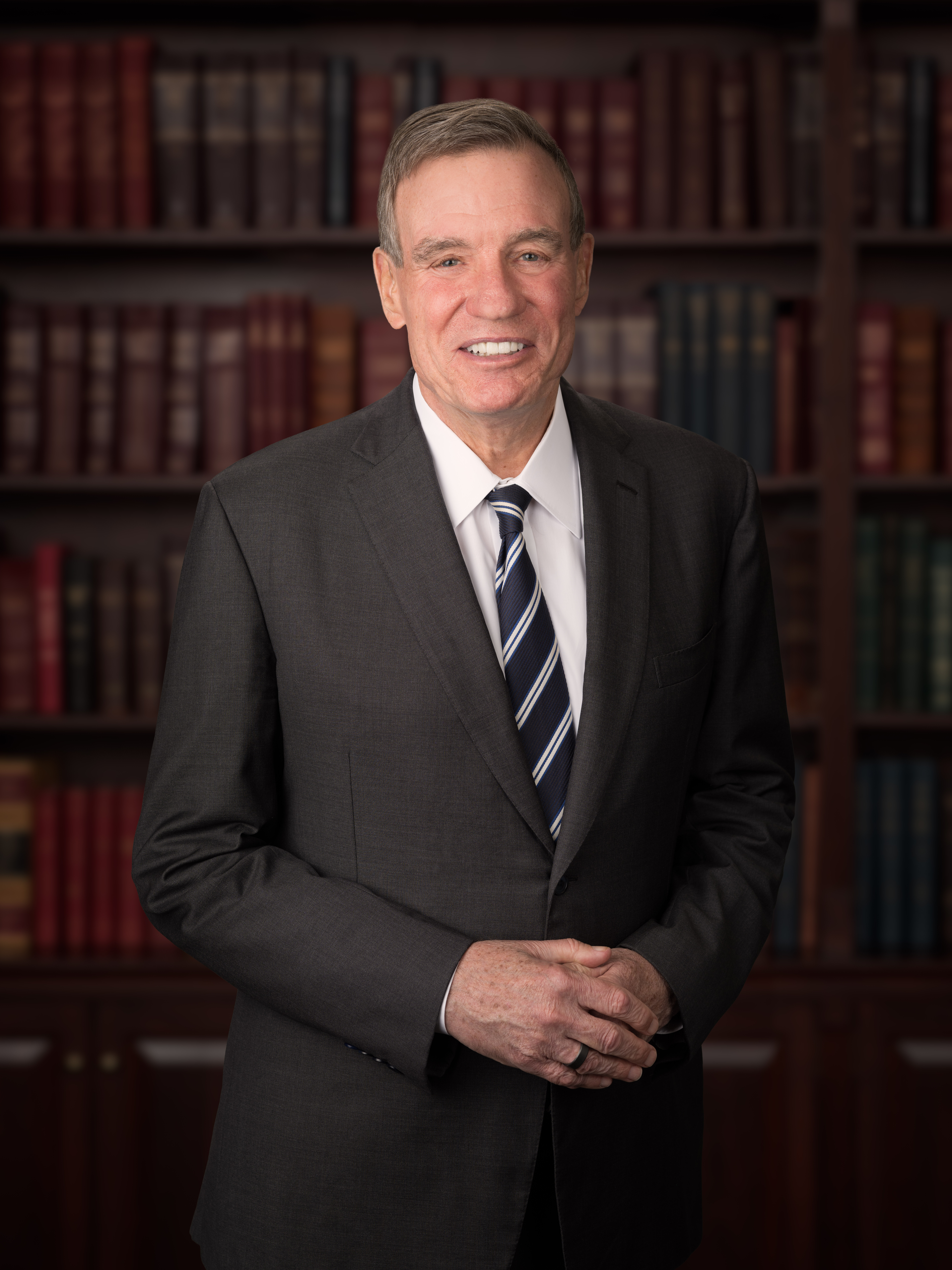
Warner alternate portrait, 2025

In 2025, Warner was one of 12 Senate Democrats who joined all Republicans to vote for the Laken Riley Act.

=== LGBT issues ===
Warner supports same-sex marriage, announcing his support in a statement on his Facebook page in March 2013. His announcement came shortly after Senator Claire McCaskill announced her support for it. In July 2015, Warner and Tim Kaine cosponsored the Equality Act along with 38 other senators and 158 members of the House of Representatives, with Kaine saying, "it's critical that we prohibit discrimination in housing, education and the workplace."

=== Minimum wage ===
In April 2014, the Senate debated the Minimum Wage Fairness Act (S. 1737; 113th Congress). The bill would amend the Fair Labor Standards Act of 1938 (FLSA) to increase the federal minimum wage for employees to $10.10 per hour over two years. The bill was strongly supported by President Obama and many Democratic senators, but strongly opposed by congressional Republicans. Warner expressed a willingness to negotiate with Republicans about some of the provisions of the bill, such as the timeline for the phase-in. He said that any increase needs to be done "in a responsible way."

=== Transparency ===
On the Senate Budget Committee, Warner was appointed chair of a bipartisan task force on government performance in 2009. He was a lead sponsor of the 2010 Government Performance and Results Act (GPRA), which imposed specific program performance goals across all federal agencies and set up a more transparent agency performance review process.

On May 21, 2013, Warner introduced the Digital Accountability and Transparency Act of 2014 (DATA). "The legislation requires standardized reporting of federal spending to be posted to a single website, allowing citizens to track spending in their communities and agencies to more easily identify improper payments, waste and fraud." On November 6, 2013, the Senate Homeland Security and Government Affairs committee unanimously passed DATA.

On January 27, 2014, the White House Office of Management and Budget's (OMB) marked-up version of the bill was leaked. This version "move[s] away from standards and toward open data structures to publish information" and "requir[es] OMB in consultation with Treasury to review and, if necessary, revise standards to ensure accuracy and consistency through methods such as establishing linkages between data in agency financial systems". Warner responded: "The Obama administration talks a lot about transparency, but these comments reflect a clear attempt to gut the DATA Act. DATA reflects years of bipartisan, bicameral work, and to propose substantial, unproductive changes this late in the game is unacceptable. We look forward to passing the DATA Act, which had near universal support in its House passage and passed unanimously out of its Senate committee. I will not back down from a bill that holds the government accountable and provides taxpayers the transparency they deserve."

On April 10, 2014, the Senate voted by unanimous consent to pass the bill, which was then passed by the House in a voice vote on April 28, 2014.

== Electoral history ==
United States Senate election in Virginia, 1996
Party	Candidate	Votes	%	±%
Republican	John Warner (Incumbent)	1,235,744	52.48%	−28.43%
Democratic	Mark Warner	1,115,982	47.39%	
Write-ins		2,989	0.13%	
Majority		119,762	5.09%	−57.67%
Turnout		2,354,715		
Republican hold		Swing		

Virginia gubernatorial election, 2001
Party	Candidate	Votes	%	±%
Democratic	Mark Warner	984,177	52.16%	+9.60%
Republican	Mark Earley	887,234	47.03%	−8.79%
Libertarian	Bill Redpath	14,497	0.77%	
Write-ins		813	0.04%	
Majority		96,943	5.14%	−8.11%
Turnout		1,886,721		
Democratic gain from Republican		Swing		

United States Senate election in Virginia, 2008
Party	Candidate	Votes	%	±%
Democratic	Mark Warner	2,369,327	65.03%	+65.03%
Republican	Jim Gilmore	1,228,830	33.72%	−48.85%
Independent Greens	Glenda Parker	21,690	0.60%	
Libertarian	Bill Redpath	20,269	0.56%	
Write-ins		3,178	0.09%	
Majority		1,140,497	31.30%	−41.53%
Turnout		3,643,294		
Democratic gain from Republican		Swing		

United States Senate election in Virginia, 2014
Party	Candidate	Votes	%	±%
Democratic	Mark Warner (Incumbent)	1,073,667	49.15%	−15.88%
Republican	Ed Gillespie	1,055,940	48.34%	+14.62%
Libertarian	Robert Sarvis	53,102	2.43%	+1.87%
Other	Write-ins	1,764	0.08%	−0.01%
Plurality		17,727	0.81%	-30.49%
Turnout		2,184,473		
Democratic hold		Swing		

United States Senate election in Virginia, 2020
Party	Candidate	Votes	%	±%
Democratic	Mark Warner (Incumbent)	2,466,500	55.99%	+6.84%
Republican	Daniel Gade	1,934,199	43.91%	−4.43%
Other	Write-ins	4,388	0.10%	+0.02%
Majority		532,301	12.08%	+11.27%
Turnout		4,405,087		
Democratic hold		Swing		

== Personal life ==
Warner is married to Lisa Collis. While on their honeymoon in 1989 in Egypt and Greece, Warner became ill; when he returned home, doctors discovered he had suffered a near-fatal burst appendix. Warner spent two months in the hospital recovering from the illness. During her husband's tenure as governor, Collis was the first Virginia first lady to use her birth name. Warner and Collis have three daughters, one of whom died in April 2026 of Type 1 diabetes and other health issues.

Warner is involved in farming and winemaking at his Rappahannock Bend farm. There, he grows 15 acres (61,000 m^{2}) of grapes for Ingleside Vineyards; Ingleside bottles a private label that Warner offers at charity auctions. He has an estimated net worth of $215 million as of 2018.

He is not related to John Warner, his predecessor in the Senate.

== Honorary degrees ==
Mark Warner has received several honorary degrees, including:

Location	Date	School	Degree
Virginia	2002	College of William and Mary	Doctor of Laws (LL.D)
District of Columbia	2003	George Washington University	Doctor of Public Service (DPS)
North Carolina	May 15, 2006	Wake Forest University	Doctor of Laws (LL.D)
Virginia	2007	Lord Fairfax Community College	Associate of Humane Letters
Virginia	May 20, 2007	Eastern Virginia Medical School	Doctorate
Virginia	May 25, 2013	George Mason University	Doctorate
Virginia	May 19, 2018	Virginia State University	Doctorate
Virginia	May 18, 2024	Virginia Wesleyan University	Doctor of Laws

== Notes ==
Party political offices
Preceded by Paul Goldman	Chair of the Virginia Democratic Party; 1993–1995	Succeeded by Suzie Wrenn
Vacant Title last held by Edythe Harrison	Democratic nominee for U.S. Senator from Virginia (Class 2); 1996	Vacant Title next held by Himself; 2008
Preceded by Don Beyer	Democratic nominee for Governor of Virginia; 2001	Succeeded by Tim Kaine
Preceded by Barack Obama	Keynote Speaker of the Democratic National Convention; 2008	Succeeded by Julian Castro
Vacant Title last held by Himself; 1996	Democratic nominee for U.S. Senator from Virginia (Class 2); 2008, 2014, 2020, 2026	Most recent
Preceded by Chuck Schumer	Vice Chair of the Senate Democratic Caucus; 2017–present Served alongside: Elizabeth Warren	Incumbent
Political offices
Preceded by Jim Gilmore	Governor of Virginia; 2002–2006	Succeeded by Tim Kaine
Preceded by Dirk Kempthorne	Chair of the National Governors Association; 2004–2005	Succeeded by Mike Huckabee
U.S. Senate
Preceded by John Warner	U.S. Senator (Class 2) from Virginia; 2009–present Served alongside: Jim Webb, Tim Kaine	Incumbent
Preceded by Dianne Feinstein	Vice Chair of the Senate Intelligence Committee; 2017–2021	Succeeded by Marco Rubio
Preceded by Marco Rubio; Acting	Chair of the Senate Intelligence Committee; 2021–2025	Succeeded by Tom Cotton
Preceded by Marco Rubio	Vice Chair of the Senate Intelligence Committee; 2025–present	Incumbent
U.S. order of precedence (ceremonial)
Preceded by Jeanne Shaheen	Order of precedence of the United States as United States Senator	Succeeded by Jeff Merkley
Preceded by Jeanne Shaheen	United States senators by seniority 20th	Succeeded by Jim Risch
