= Paul Goldman (politician) =

American politician from Virginia

Chair of the Virginia Democratic Party
- In office January 13, 1990 – May 4, 1993
- Preceded by: Larry Framme
- Succeeded by: Mark Warner

Personal details
- Born: Palm Beach, Florida, U.S.
- Party: Democratic
- Education: Syracuse University (JD, MPA)

Paul Goldman is an American politician, attorney, activist, and political strategist who served as the chair of the Democratic Party of Virginia from 1990 to 1993. Goldman was a Democratic candidate for the 2021 Virginia lieutenant gubernatorial election.

== Early life and education ==
Goldman was born into a prominent family in Palm Beach, Florida. He earned a Juris Doctor and Master of Public Administration from Syracuse University. As an undergraduate, he worked on Dan Walker's campaign for Governor of Illinois.

== Career ==
After college, Goldman worked on Robert F. Kennedy 1968 presidential campaign. He later worked as a volunteer in the Cabrini–Green Homes. In 1973, he began working as an attorney in the New Jersey Department of Consumer Protection. Goldman then served on the gubernatorial campaign of Hugh Carey. Goldman relocated to Virginia to work as a campaign consultant for Chuck Robb.

Prior to serving as state Democratic Party chair, Goldman worked as an attorney. He then served on the campaign of Douglas Wilder. He had previously worked as the campaign manager for Henry Howell, who was elected Lieutenant Governor of Virginia in 1970. Goldman led the 2003 Richmond elected mayor ballot initiative and was later a candidate for Richmond City Council. Goldman has since worked as a political operative in Richmond, Virginia, supporting various changes to the city charter. Goldman has also worked as a public education advocate, and frequently lobbies the Virginia General Assembly to support school modernization.

Goldman has written columns on education policy for The New York Times, The Washington Post, The Hill, and Politico.
