= Emily Couric =

American politician

Chair of the Democratic Party of Virginia
- In office December 2, 2000 – October 18, 2001 Serving with Lawrence H. Framme III
- Preceded by: Kenneth R. Plum
- Succeeded by: Lawrence H. Framme III

Member of the Virginia Senate from the 25th district
- In office January 10, 1996 – October 18, 2001
- Preceded by: Edgar Robb
- Succeeded by: Creigh Deeds

Personal details
- Born: June 5, 1947 Atlanta, Georgia, U.S.
- Died: October 18, 2001 (aged 54) Charlottesville, Virginia, U.S.
- Party: Democratic
- Spouses: Raymond Wadlow (m. 1969; div. 1980) George Beller (m. 1981)
- Children: 2, including Jeff Wadlow
- Relatives: Katie Couric (sister)
- Education: Smith College (BA)

Emily Couric (June 5, 1947 – October 18, 2001) was a Virginia Democratic state senator from Charlottesville.

== Life and career ==
Couric was born to Elinor (Hene) Couric, a homemaker and part-time writer, and John Martin Couric, a public relations executive and news editor at The Atlanta Journal-Constitution and United Press International in Washington, D.C. Although her mother was Jewish, she converted to Presbyterianism, and Couric was raised in her father's Presbyterian faith, like her siblings. Couric's maternal grandparents, Bert Hene and Clara L. Froshin, were the children of Jewish immigrants from the German Empire, mostly in present-day Germany. Couric was the sister of Clara Couric Batchelor, John M. Couric, Jr., and former CBS Evening News anchor Katie Couric. Before Couric was married to Dr. George A. Beller, she was married to attorney R. Clark Wadlow, with whom she had two children, oncologist Raymond C. Wadlow and filmmaker Jeff Wadlow.

== Death and legacy ==
Couric died of pancreatic cancer in October 2001.

The Emily Couric Clinical Cancer Center at the University of Virginia Health System's hospital, pays tribute to Couric's efforts to obtain funds for cancer care and research in Virginia.

Couric's papers are held at the Albert and Shirley Small Special Collections Library at the University of Virginia.
