= 1984 United States Senate election in Virginia =

- November 6, 1984
- Turnout: 52.4% (voting eligible)
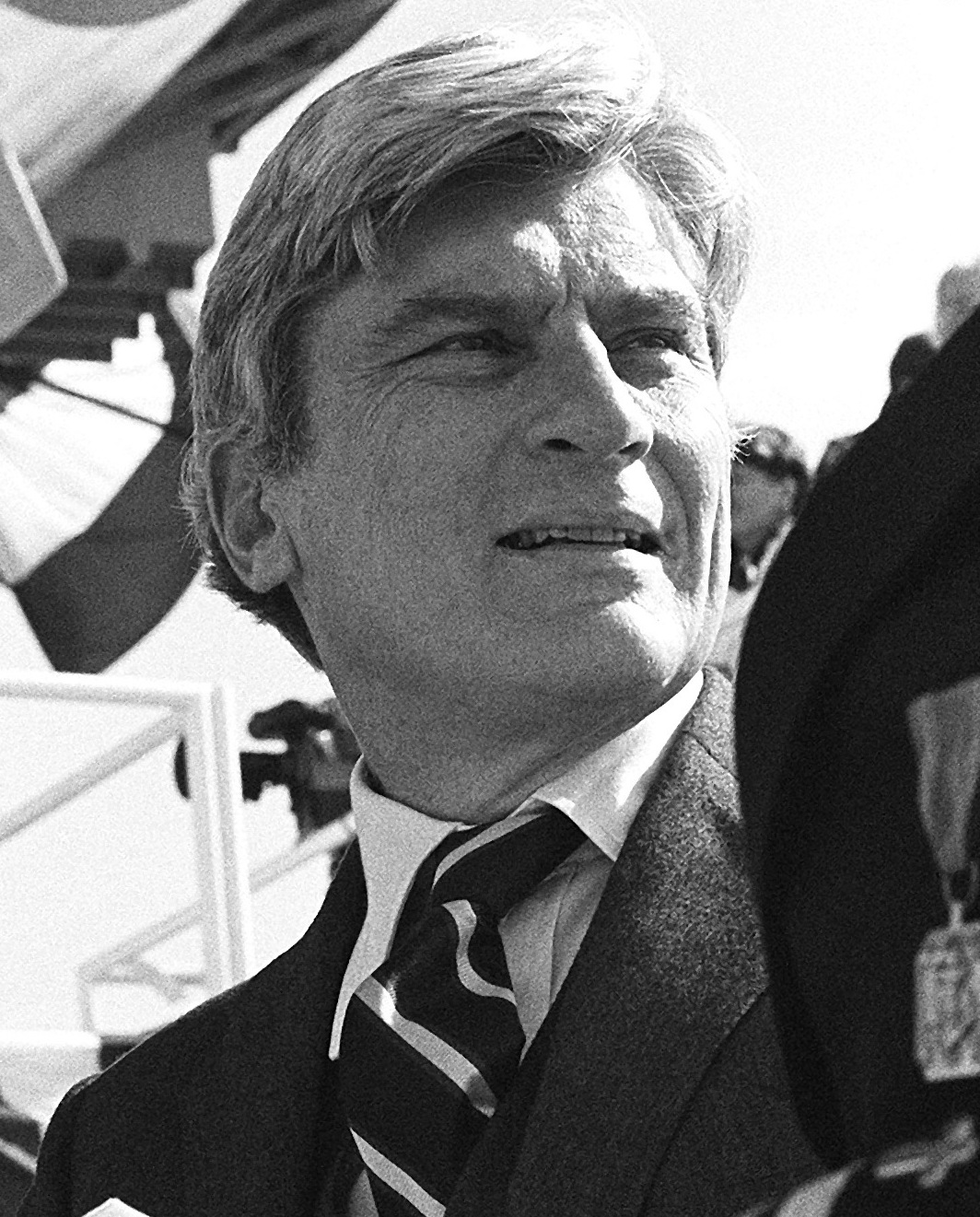

Nominee	John Warner	Edythe Harrison
Party	Republican	Democratic
Popular vote	1,406,194	601,142
Percentage	70.05%	29.95%
- Warner: 50–60% 60–70% 70–80% 80–90% >90% Harrison: 50–60% 60–70% 70–80% 80–90% >90% Tie: 40–50% No vote
U.S. senator before election
John Warner
Republican
Elected U.S. Senator
John Warner
Republican

The 1984 United States Senate election in Virginia took place on November 6, 1984. Incumbent Republican U.S. Senator John Warner won re-election to a second term. He handily defeated Edythe Harrison, the first woman in Virginia nominated by the Democratic Party for statewide office. Warner became the first Republican ever re-elected to the Senate from Virginia, and the only one ever to serve more than one term.

== Candidates ==
=== Democratic ===
- Edythe C. Harrison, member of the Virginia House of Delegates

=== Republican ===
- John Warner, incumbent Senator

== Results ==
United States Senate election in Virginia, 1984
Party	Candidate	Votes	%	±%
Republican	John Warner (incumbent)	1,406,194	70.05%	+19.88%
Democratic	Edythe C. Harrison	601,142	29.95%	−19.84%
Write-ins		151	0.01%	−0.03%
Majority		805,052	40.10%	+39.71%
Turnout		2,007,487		
Republican hold				

== See also ==
- 1984 United States Senate elections
