= Edythe Harrison =

American politician (1934–2026)

Edythe 'Edie' Harrison

Member of the Virginia House of Delegates
- In office January 9, 1980 – January 12, 1983
- Preceded by: Albert Teich
- Succeeded by: Stephen E. Gordy
- Constituency: 39th district (1980–82); 37th district (1982–83)

Personal details
- Born: Edythe Joyce Colton; September 17, 1934 Detroit, Michigan, U.S.
- Died: September 1, 2026 (aged 91) Boca Raton, Florida, U.S.
- Party: Democratic
- Spouse: Stanley Harrison
- Children: Tim, Jody, Julie
- Education: Stephens College (attended); Marymount Manhattan College (attended); Wayne State University (BA)
- Awards: National Conference of Christians and Jews, Brotherhood Award (1978) Virginia Women in History honoree, Library of Virginia (2010)

Edythe Colton Harrison (September 17, 1934 – September 1, 2026) was an American politician who served as a member of the Virginia House of Delegates from 1980 to 1983. She lost renomination to Tom Moss in 1982 after the state's House district maps were redrawn. In 1984, she ran for United States Senate, losing to the Republican incumbent, John Warner. She was the first woman nominated for statewide office by the Virginia Democratic Party.

In 1974, Harrison worked to found the Virginia Opera Association and led a fundraising campaign to restore the Norfolk Municipal Auditorium for the company's new home, the Harrison Opera House.

Harrison died on September 1, 2026, at the age of 91.

Party political offices
Preceded by Andrew P. Miller	Democratic nominee for U.S. Senator from Virginia (Class 2); 1984	Vacant Title next held by Mark Warner
