= Danica Roem =

American journalist and politician

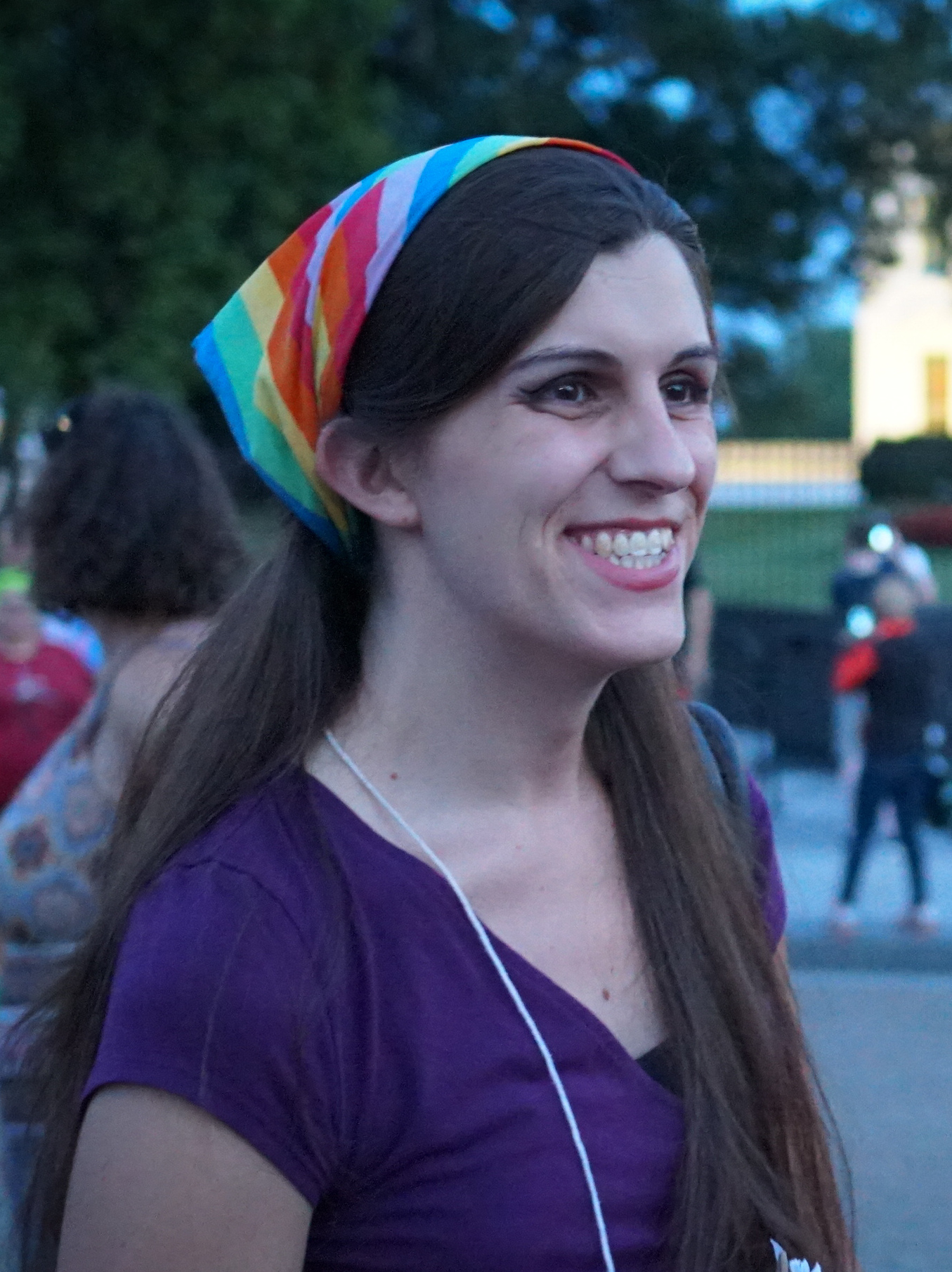
- Roem in 2017

Member of the Virginia Senate from the 30th district
- Incumbent
- Assumed office January 10, 2024
- Preceded by: Adam Ebbin (redistricting)

Member of the Virginia House of Delegates from the 13th district
- In office January 10, 2018 – January 10, 2024
- Preceded by: Bob Marshall
- Succeeded by: Michelle Maldonado (redistricting)

Personal details
- Born: September 30, 1984 (age 42) Manassas, Virginia, U.S.
- Party: Democratic
- Education: St. Bonaventure University (BA)

Danica Anthony Roem (/roʊm/ ROHM; born September 30, 1984) is an American journalist and politician who has served in the Virginia Senate since 2024. A Democrat, she represents the 30th district covering part of Prince William County including the cities of Manassas and Manassas Park. She previously served in the Virginia House of Delegates representing the 13th district from 2018-2024.

Elected to the Virginia House of Delegates in 2017, Roem is the first openly transgender person elected to either house of the Virginia General Assembly, and upon her January 2018 swearing-in became the first openly transgender person to be elected and serve in a state legislature in U.S. history. In 2023, she was elected to the Virginia Senate, becoming the first openly transgender person to be elected to a state senate in the Southern United States. Upon her January 2024 swearing-in, she became the first openly transgender person to be elected and serve in both chambers of a state legislature in U.S. history.

== Early life and education ==
Roem was born at Prince William Hospital and raised in Manassas, Virginia, the child of Marian and John Paul Roem. Her father died by suicide when she was three years old, and her maternal grandfather, Anthony Oliveto, acted as a father figure. Living in Manassas, Virginia, for her whole life, she attended the majority of her schooling there. She went to Loch Lomond Elementary School for grades K-3, and then All Saints School for grades 4–8. She then attended Paul VI Catholic High School in Fairfax, Virginia, and then went to her aunt and uncle's alma mater, St. Bonaventure University in St. Bonaventure, New York, to pursue journalism. As a student at St. Bonaventure University, she had a 1.1 GPA her first semester and was more focused on music than homework. During her second semester, she raised her GPA to a 3.48 and made the dean's list. Her professors described her as tenacious, persistent, and someone who worked for those whose voices were often ignored. She returned to Virginia after graduation.

Roem has stated that her role models growing up were Senator Chuck Colgan and Delegate Harry Parrish because, although they were affiliated with a party, they had more independent ideologies.

== Journalism career ==
When Roem was a child, her grandfather would tell her, "the basis of my knowledge comes from reading the newspaper every day." This influenced her to become a journalist. She was a journalist for ten and a half years. Her first job out of college, in 2006, was at the Gainesville Times in Gainesville, Virginia. She was lead reporter for the Gainesville Times and Prince William Times. She then went to work as a news editor in August 2015 at the Montgomery County Sentinel in Rockville, Maryland, where she was employed until December 2016. She then decided to run for public office. She said her journalism career has given her a wide knowledge of local policy issues. She won seven awards from the Virginia Press Association, including multiple wins as the "Readers' Choice" for best local public servant.

== Political positions ==
=== Education ===
Roem opposes a bill that would require schools to notify parents if their child identifies as a gender different from the student's assigned sex.

=== Freedom of the press ===
In 2020, Roem, a former journalist, co-sponsored a bill (HB 36) to protect freedom of the press. The bill would affirmatively protect the free-speech rights of student journalists at public schools and prohibit school administration from censoring their work unless it is defamatory, violates federal law, or is likely to spur unlawful acts of violence. The bill was co-sponsored in the House by Chris Hurst and has a companion bill in the Senate which was introduced by David W. Marsden. The bill was introduced in response to multiple instances of schools censoring journalism by students on campus, which is permitted under the 1988 Supreme Court ruling Hazelwood School District v. Kuhlmeier. Similar bills have been introduced by Roem and other General Assembly members in three previous legislative sessions but have failed to advance.

=== LGBTQ rights ===
Roem introduced (and was the first sponsor) of Virginia House Bill 2132, which proposed to amend the Virginia constitution to ban the "gay panic defense." The bill passed the Virginia House of Delegates with a vote of 58-42 and the Virginia Senate with a vote of 23-15 in February 2021, and was signed into law by Governor Ralph Northam.

=== Workers' rights ===
Roem was a sponsor of a 2025 bill which proposed to repeal Virginia's ban on collective bargaining by public employees. The bill passed the Virginia House and Senate in February 2025 and was vetoed by Governor Glenn Youngkin on March 24, 2025. The Virginia Senate sustained Youngkin's veto.

== Political career ==
=== Elections ===
==== 2017 election ====
Roem first became interested in politics in 2004 following President George W. Bush's proposal to add a constitutional amendment to ban same-sex marriage. After that, she was interested in looking into how the government operates and how she could change it.

Roem was recruited to run for the Virginia House of Delegates by her local Democratic Party and specifically Delegate Rip Sullivan, the recruiting chair for the Virginia House Democratic Caucus. She states that she had never considered running, but it did not take a lot of convincing. In 2017, a first-time candidate, Roem challenged Republican Bob Marshall, who was a 13-term incumbent representative. Marshall is a self-described "chief homophobe" and was a sponsor on Virginia's bill to end same-sex marriage and Virginia's bathroom bill.

Roem was endorsed by the Victory Fund, EMILY's List, Run for Something, Virginia's List, and the Progressive Change Campaign Committee and was able to raise $500,000 in donations, much of it coming from LGBTQ+ supporters and other national allies, out raising her opponent 3-to-1. Her campaign knocked on more than 75,000 doors in a district with only 52,471 voters. Her campaign faced significant transphobic discrimination. Marshall consistently attacked Roem's gender identity through his advertisements. She was also attacked by a conversion therapy advocate, who stated that Roem was trans because her father committed suicide and her grandfather failed to serve as an adequate role model for her. Roem stated that she never wanted the focus to be about her gender, and instead focused mainly on traffic issues in the district that she had faced.

Roem ran as a Democrat in the 2017 election for the 13th District of the Virginia House of Delegates against Republican incumbent Bob Marshall, who had held the office for the previous 25 years. In January 2017, Marshall introduced the "Physical Privacy Act" (HB 1612), a bathroom bill which died in committee two weeks later in January. Marshall has referred to himself as Virginia's "chief homophobe".

Roem declared her candidacy in January 2017. She received endorsements from the Victory Fund and the Progressive Change Campaign Committee. Between April 1 and June 1, Roem received 1,064 donations of under $100, the highest of any delegate candidate in the state other than Chris Hurst. Roem's platform was based on economic and transportation issues, centered on a promise to fix Virginia State Route 28.

In July 2017, following President Donald Trump's announcement of a ban on transgender people serving in the U.S. military, Roem received a $50,000 donation from Milwaukee County Executive Chris Abele.

In August 2017, Roem received an endorsement from the Human Rights Campaign (HRC). In October 2017, she was endorsed by former Vice President Joe Biden.

In September 2017, Roem posted a web video entitled "Inspire", criticizing her opponent's refusal to debate her or to refer to her as a woman. In the video, she says "There are millions of transgender people in the country, and we all deserve representation in government."

In October 2017, Roem's campaign received reports that residents of her district were receiving anti-transgender robocalls. Roem said the calls were being made by the American Principles Project, which has circulated a petition to "Stop Transgender Medical Experimentation on Children". Also in October 2017, the Republican Party of Virginia mailed campaign fliers attacking comments Roem made during a September radio interview. Although the fliers, approved by Roem's opponent, used male pronouns to refer to Roem, the party's executive director dismissed the idea that they were attacking Roem's gender identity.

Over the course of the campaign, she out-raised Marshall by a 5 to 1 margin, collecting over $370,000, including over 4,100 small-dollar donations from Progressive Change Campaign Committee members.

==== 2019 election ====
In the 2019 cycle, Roem was challenged by Republican Kelly McGinn, a former human rights lawyer. Roem campaigned heavily on her vote to expand Virginia's Medicaid program and efforts to reduce traffic on the congested Route 28. On November 5, 2019, Roem defeated McGinn, becoming the first openly transgender state legislator to be re-elected.

==== 2021 election ====
Roem faced Republican challenger Christopher Stone in the 2021 Virginia House of Delegates election. On November 2, 2021, Roem defeated Stone.

==== 2023 election ====
Roem ran as the Democratic candidate for Senate District 30 in the 2023 elections against Republican candidate Bill Woolf. Roem defeated Woolf in the election on November 7, becoming the first openly transgender person to be elected and serve in both houses of a state legislature, and the first transgender state senator in the Southern United States.

=== Committee assignments ===
Roem is a member of the Communications, Technology, and Innovation Committee and serves as the Chair of the Communications Subcommittee. In the Counties, Cities, and Towns Committee, she serves as chair of the Charters Subcommittee and as a member of the Ad Hoc Subcommittee. Additionally, Roem serves as a member in both the Transportation Innovation and General Topics Subcommittee and Transportation Systems Subcommittee in the Transportation Committee.

== Electoral history ==
=== Results ===
Virginia House of Delegates, District 13 2017 Democratic primary
| Party | Candidate | Votes | % |
|---|---|---|---|
| Democratic | Danica A. Roem | 1,863 | 42.94 |
| Democratic | Steven A. Jansen | 1,365 | 31.46 |
| Democratic | Mansimran Singh Kahlon | 821 | 18.92 |
| Democratic | Andrew A. Adams | 290 | 6.68 |
| Total votes | | 4,339 | 100.00 |

Virginia House of Delegates, District 13 2017 general election
| Party | Candidate | Votes | % |
|---|---|---|---|
| Democratic | Danica A. Roem | 12,077 | 53.72 |
| Republican | Bob Marshall (incumbent) | 10,318 | 45.89 |
| Write-in | | 88 | 0.39 |
| Total votes | | 22,483 | 100.00 |
| Democratic gain from Republican | | | |

Virginia House of Delegates, District 13 2019 general election
| Party | Candidate | Votes | % |
|---|---|---|---|
| Democratic | Danica Roem (incumbent) | 10,741 | 56.90 |
| Republican | Kelly McGinn | 8,137 | 43.10 |
| Total votes | | 18,878 | 100.00 |
| Democratic hold | | | |

Virginia House of Delegates, District 13 2021 general election
| Party | Candidate | Votes | % |
|---|---|---|---|
| Democratic | Danica Roem (incumbent) | 15,276 | 54.36 |
| Republican | Christopher Stone | 12,826 | 45.64 |
| Total votes | | 28,102 | 100.00 |
| Democratic hold | | | |

Virginia State Senate, District 30 2023 general election
| Party | Candidate | Votes | % |
|---|---|---|---|
| Democratic | Danica Roem | 30,499 | 51.76 |
| Republican | Bill Woolf | 28,240 | 47.93 |
| Write-in | | 183 | 0.31 |
| Total votes | | 58,739 | 100.00 |
| Democratic hold | | | |

== Awards and recognition ==
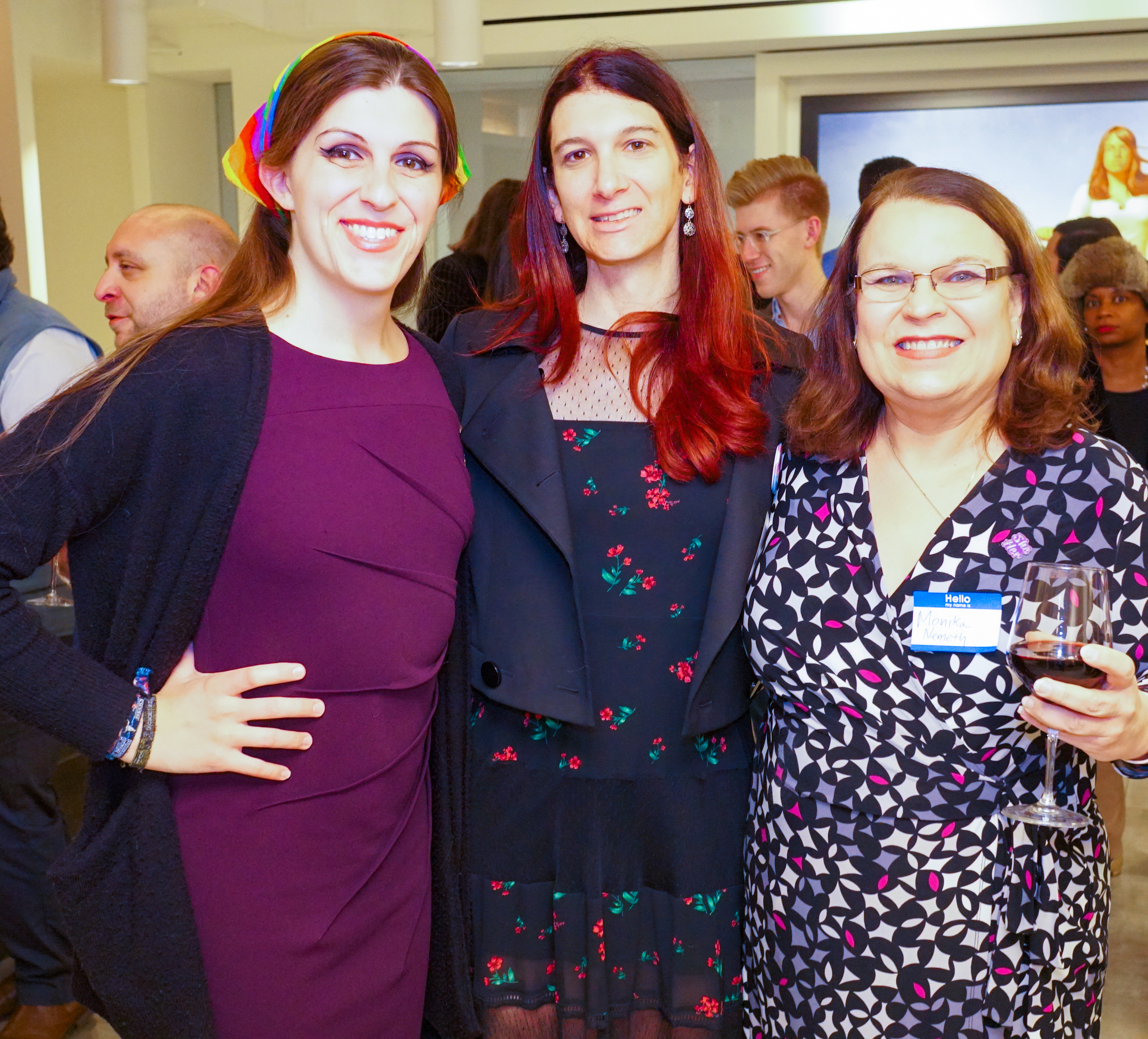
Roem at a reception hosted in her honor

In December 2018, the Gertrude Stein Democratic Club, the District of Columbia's largest local LGBT political group, honored Roem with its Justice Award.

== Personal life ==
Roem was a vocalist in the thrash metal band Cab Ride Home. She first got interested in metal music in high school, and viewed metal music as her rebellion. Her band has performed 120 shows and has toured in the United Kingdom. During her campaign, her Republican opponent said that her "eccentric music videos" led her to be "out of touch with the district's suburban sensibilities" and not fit for the position.

She has a boyfriend and a daughter, but she has stated that she does not discuss them often because she does not want them to face the same discrimination that she has faced. She lives in Manassas, Virginia. Roem has been active in her stepdaughter's public school board. In her 2022 memoir, Burn the Page, Roem wrote, "I'm pretty straight sexually for a woman in that I physically prefer a masculine presentation but pansexual romantically in that someone's gender doesn't determine my ability to fall in love with that person."

=== Transition ===
In 2012, Roem started her transition, and on December 3, 2013, she began hormone replacement therapy. She described her friends and co-workers as very supportive during her transition, stating that "no one cared. It was great. I could just keep doing my job". In 2015, she changed her name to Danica. Growing up she often felt like she had no one to talk to about the way she was feeling about her gender and it wasn't until she left for college that she started to explore her identity. While at college, though, she described her struggle with gender dysphoria as "suffocating" and would often not leave her room for days. She won her university's gender buster award, and received negative responses due to it in her school's student newspaper. Due to this, she did not feel comfortable coming out during that time.

During her campaign, Marshall tried to use her gender identity against her by misgendering her and refusing to debate her. Marshall also stated that she was not a real woman because she will never be able to get cervical or ovarian cancer. Roem responded by releasing a video stating that her "identity shouldn't be a big deal. This is just who I am." Throughout her campaign and now as an elected official, she has received many positive and inspiring messages from trans individuals from all around the country. While very comfortable with her gender identity, she realizes the severity of the current political climate, and has stated that she strives to never make anyone uncomfortable around her because of her gender identity. Roem has said that she is proud to be a trans woman, and that she "never ran away from her identity. Ever. [She] owned it immediately, and [she] celebrated it."

== See also ==
- List of transgender public officeholders in the United States

Virginia House of Delegates
| Preceded by Bob Marshall | Member of the Virginia House of Delegates from the 13th district 2018–2024 | Succeeded by Marcus Simon |
Senate of Virginia
| Preceded by Adam Ebbin | Member of the Virginia Senate from the 30th district 2024–Present | Incumbent |
