= Kenneth Calvert =

Kenneth Calvert may refer to:

- Ken Calvert, U.S. Representative from California
- Kenneth E. Calvert, member of the Virginia House of Delegates
- Kenneth L. Calvert, American electrical engineer
