= Saxman =

Saxman may refer to:

Places

- Saxman, Alaska, named after Professor S. A. Saxman
- Saxman, Kansas
- Saxman, West Virginia, an unincorporated community in Nicholas County, West Virginia

== Family name ==
- Christopher "Chris" B. Saxman (born 1965, Pittsburgh, Pennsylvania), an American politician
- Ville Saxman (born 1989), a Finnish footballer
