= Virginia's 50th House of Delegates district =

Virginia legislative district

District map from the 2023 election

Virginia's 50th House of Delegates district elects one of the 100 members of the Virginia House of Delegates, the lower house of the state's bicameral legislature. After redistricting in 2024, the district is now based in central southern Virginia, including Chase City and Kerr Lake. It was once made up of most of Manassas City and some of Prince William County. The representative of the 50th district is Tommy Wright.

== Elections ==
=== 1981 ===
Republican Harry J. Parrish, who had previously served as a Manassas council member, was elected to represent District 50 in 1981, which he did continuously for the following 25 years. His health declined in later years but he nevertheless defeated a 2005 primary challenge, and served until his death on March 28, 2006.

=== 2007 ===
In 2006, Republican Jackson Miller was elected to represent the district in a special election to fill the seat following Parrish's death. Miller was reelected to five full terms, generally with about 60% of the vote (with the exception of 2011, when he was unopposed).

=== 2017 ===
In the 2017 Virginia's House of Delegates election, Carter defeated Jackson Miller, the incumbent and Republican majority whip of the House of Delegates, 11,360 to 9,510. 9510 was the largest number of votes Miller had ever received in the district; previously Miller's highest total (always sufficient to retain his seat) was 9,500.

Carter, a first-time candidate, decided to run after difficulties dealing with the Virginia Workers’ Compensation Commission following an injury on the job. His campaign initially coordinated with the Democratic Party, but ceased reporting internal numbers to the Party following what Carter described as security lapses, and the Party withdrew financial support. During the campaign, Miller sent out mailers comparing Carter to Joseph Stalin and Mao Zedong.

=== 2019 ===
In 2019, incumbent Carter fended off a challenge in the Democratic primary by Manassas City Councilman Mark Wolfe. (Wolfe became a Democrat in 2016, having first been elected to the Manassas City Council as a Republican in 2008 and again in 2012). Carter faced Manassas City Councilman Ian Lovejoy, a Republican, in the general election, and won reelection with 53% of the vote.

== District officeholders ==
Years	Delegate	Party	Electoral history
January 1982 – March 28, 2006	Harry J. Parrish	Republican	Died in office
January 2007 – January 2018	Jackson Miller	Republican	Elected in 2006 special to fill vacated seat after Parrish's death; defeated in bid for reelection
January 2018 – January 2022	Lee Carter	Democratic	Lost Democratic Primary to Michelle Maldonado in 2021
January 2022 – January 2024	Michelle Maldonado	Democratic	First elected in 2021; Redistricted to the 20th district
January 2024 – present	Thomas C. Wright	Republican	Redistricted from the 61st district
