= John Rollinson =

John Rollinson may refer to:

- John K. Rollinson (1884–1948), American writer of western non-fiction
- John A. Rollison III (born 1950), American businessman and politician in the Virginia General Assembly
