= William Beeton =

William Beeton may refer to:

- William A. Beeton Jr. (1943–2002), American attorney and politician
- William Hugh Beeton (1903–1976), Ghana commissioner
