= Dumfries-Triangle Rescue Squad =

Agency overview
- Established: 1959
- Employees: 100
- Staffing: Volunteer
- Fire chief: S.B. Chasin
- EMS level: ALS and BLS
- Motto: "We Serve to Save"

Facilities and equipment
- Stations: 1
- Rescues: 1
- Ambulances: 5
- Rescue boats: 1

Website
- www.d-trs.com

Dumfries-Triangle Rescue Squad (DTRS) was formally organized on January 8, 1957 and began operations with one ambulance donated by Cope Ford of Triangle. The men who had organized DTRS were sharing space and affiliated with the Dumfries Triangle Volunteer Fire Department (DTVFD) at that time.

In February 1959, the 21 member squad of DTRS formally separated from DTVFD and applied for a formal charter from the Virginia State Corporation Commission. When asked about the separation from DTVFD, DTRS member Ed Publicover responded, “separation is to permit the Fire Department and Rescue Squad to expand in order to keep pace with a growing area.” In 1959 DTRS had 3 ambulances in its fleet, 2 that it owned outright and the other was on indefinite loan from the Civil Defense Authorities.

On April 2, 1959 DTRS was granted its charter. According to the organization's records, 22 individuals are listed as the charter members of DTRS.

That year DTRS elected its first official officers. Records show the following individuals as the 1959 officers for DTRS: Jack Fick Jr (President); Carey Perkinson (Vice-President); Bascome Henley (Captain); Bill Rainey (Lieutenant); Francis Keys (Secretary & Treasurer); Edward Publicover (Sergeant); H.B. Stanley (Sergeant).

In 1967 the DTRS Junior Squad was established. This marked the first junior squad to be established in Prince William County. On April 9, 1967 Virginia State Delegate Stanley A. Owens swore in the first officers of DTRS Junior Squad. These officers were: Don Mercer (Captain); Allen Barbee (1st Lieutenant); Van Keys (Sergeant); John Fick (Treasurer); Art Milona (Secretary). In addition the following individuals were listed as members of the junior squad Bill Yarnall, Lee Hise, Tom Fraizer, Mike Taylor, George Ford, Ted McInteer, Harvey Anderson, Ted Petts, Larry Liming, Ron Clark, Warren Towne, and Eddie Dixon.

On October 17, 2017 the Prince William County Board of Supervisors voted unanimously to disband and dissolve Dumfries-Triangle Rescue Squad transferring all property, assets, contracts and accounts to the county.

On October 22, 2020, the Supreme Court of Virginia ruled that the Prince William County Board of Supervisors lacked the legal ability to dissolve Dumfries-Triangle Rescue Squad pursuant to Code § 32.1-111.4:7 since it was incorporated under Title 13.1 and not Title 32.1. Since DTRS was not “established pursuant to” Code § 32.1-111.4:7, rather, pursuant to its Articles of Incorporation, it was established under Title 13.1 as a private, nonstock corporation and because DTRS existed as a corporation registered with the SCC since 1959, well prior to the enactment of Code § 32.1-111.4:7. The Prince William County Board of Supervisors is to free dissolve its contractual relationship with DTRS regarding emergency medical services only.

== Organization ==
President: Richard Searle
Vice President: Ashley Aldridge
Treasurer: Jennette Blacker
Secretary: Jo Lepage
Chief/Rescue Chief: Steven B Chasin
