= John Avoli =

Virginia house of representatives member

Member of the Virginia House of Delegates from the 20th district
- In office January 8, 2020 – January 10, 2024
- Preceded by: Richard Bell
- Succeeded by: Michelle Maldonado (redistricting)

Personal details
- Born: 1951 (age 74–75) Trivigliano, Italy
- Party: Republican
- Spouse: Lynn Avoli
- Website: johnavoli.com

Gianfranco "John" Avoli is an American politician. A Republican, he was a member of the Virginia House of Delegates, representing the 20th district.

A longtime resident of Staunton, Virginia, Avoli has held multiple positions in the public sector, including serving 16 years on the Staunton City Council, 14 of which as the city's mayor.

Avoli ran in the 2019 Virginia House of Delegates election for the 20th district to succeed retiring delegate Richard Bell. He defeated Democratic candidate Jennifer Lewis with 58.48% of the vote.

In December 2021, Avoli introduced a bill to the House of Delegates that would restrict transgender students' access to public school restrooms and other facilities.
