= Floyd C. Bagley =

American lawyer and politician

Member of the Virginia House of Delegates from the Prince William district
- In office January 14, 1976 – January 7, 1986
- Preceded by: Stanley A. Owens
- Succeeded by: John A. Rollinson III

Personal details
- Born: March 20, 1922 Gardiner, Maine, U.S.
- Died: December 5, 2002 (aged 80) Fredericksburg, Virginia, U.S.
- Party: Democratic
- Spouse: Beverley Victoria Sularz
- Children: Barbara B. Ely, Beverly B. Dunn
- Education: American University; Washington College of Law

Military service
- Allegiance: United States
- Branch/service: United States Marine Corps
- Battles/wars: World War II; Korean War

Floyd Caldwell Bagley (March 20, 1922 – December 5, 2002) was an American politician and lawyer. He served as town attorney for Dumfries, Virginia and later, part-time, five terms in the Virginia General Assembly representing Prince William County, Virginia (although his district's configuration and number changed during his tenure).

== Early and family life ==
Born in Gardiner, Maine, Bagby attended American University and received an LLB degree from its Washington College of Law.

He married Beverley Victoria Sularz (1916–2012), and they had two daughters and a son (Floyd Almer Bagley II, nicknamed "Spud" who died in 1970).

== Military and legal career ==
Bagley enlisted in the U.S. Marine Corps as World War II began, and served twenty years, retiring in 1959 after the Korean War from a posting at headquarters. He attended American University's Washington College of Law.

After 11 years as a civilian, Bagley re-enlisted around the time of his son Spud's death. Bagley served from 1970 until 1972 as a judge advocate general (military judge) at Quantico Marine Base. After his final retirement (with the rank of Captain), Bagley remained active in the American Legion, Forty and Eight (an elite group within the American Legion), Veterans of Foreign Wars and Marine Corps League, as well as a judge advocate with the Virginia American Legion, 3rd Marine Division Association and National Sojourners.

For six of the eleven years between Bagley's service as a Marine Corps attorney and as a military judge, he was town attorney for Dumfries, Virginia. He helped organize the Local Government Attorneys of Virginia association (and served as its director), and was active in the Virginia Bar Association, Prince William Bar Association and Delta Theta Phi law fraternity. He also owned the "Potomac News" for a time and led the Eastern Prince William Chamber of Commerce for a term. Other memberships included Masons (Alexandria Scottish Rite) and Acca Temple Shrine.

== Political career ==
Bagley was active in his local county Democratic party, as well as that for the 8th Congressional district. Upon retiring as a military judge, he was elected county attorney for Prince William County, Virginia, and served from 1972 to 1976.

After major redistricting following the 1970 census, all three of the delegates representing Prince William County changed in the 1975 election, as the district now designated the 41st linked Loudoun County with the cities of Manassas and Manassas Park in Prince William County. Bagley, Earl E. Bell and David G. Brinkley were elected to replace Stanley A. Owens, William R. Murphy and Kenneth B. Rollins. Bagley established a private legal practice and served part-time position as a legislature until defeated by Republican Jack Rollinson in 1985. Following the 1980 census, the three-man delegation from Prince William County was split into individual districts. Thus Bagley, Brinkley and Harry J. Parrish were jointly elected from District 23 in the 1981 election, but in 1983 Bagley won re-election from District 52.

During his legislative tenure, Bagley chaired the State Commission on Veterans Affairs, which funded creation of a veterans home in Roanoke, as well as served on the Dulles International Airport Development Commission (like his predecessor Stanley Owens). He was involved in two controversies. In 1980, he was accused of creating an additional judgeship in Prince William County in hopes that his fellow legislators would select him to fill it, as did not happen. Also, in 1982, Bagley authored a bill which the legislature passed but governor Charles Robb refused to sign as contrary to the First Amendment until its new criminal libel provision was removed. That would have criminalized intentional circulation of false written statements in an election campaign. Bagley lost his re-election race in 1985. He attempted to regain his seat as an independent but lost, and also ran but was not elected chairman of the Prince William County Board of Supervisors.

== Death ==
Bagley suffered from dementia in his final years. He died at a Fredericksburg, Virginia nursing home on December 5, 2002, survived by his widow and two daughters. He is buried at Arlington National Cemetery, as is his wife and son.

Virginia House of Delegates
Preceded by Stanley A. Owens	Virginia Delegate for Prince William County; 1976–1986	Succeeded by John A. Rollinson III
