= Jeff Frederick =

American politician (born 1975)

Jeffrey M. Frederick

Member of the Virginia House of Delegates from the 52nd district
- In office January 14, 2004 – January 13, 2010
- Preceded by: Jack Rollison
- Succeeded by: Luke Torian

Personal details
- Born: September 23, 1975 (age 51) Fairfax, Virginia
- Party: Republican
- Spouse: Amy Noone (m. 2001; div. 2019)
- Children: Grace, Isabel, Michael
- Education: Emory University
- Occupation: Politician, CEO, Entrepreneur, Brewery Owner
- Committees: Finance; Health, Welfare and Institutions; Privileges and Elections; Transportation; Education
- Website: starboard.us, vafuture.com

Military service
- Branch/service: United States Navy
- Years of service: 1996–1997
- Unit: United States Naval Reserve

Jeffrey M. Frederick (born September 23, 1975) is an American politician, CEO, entrepreneur, and craft beer brewery owner. He served three terms as a Republican member of the Virginia House of Delegates. Frederick was also chairman of the Republican Party of Virginia and a member of the Republican National Committee.

== Personal ==
Born to an American father and Colombian mother, Frederick spent his early childhood in Northern Virginia before moving to Florida after his stepfather's retirement from the U.S. Navy. He graduated from Lakewood High School in St. Petersburg following his junior year, having been admitted to Emory University in Atlanta after three years of high school. He received degrees from Oxford (1995) and Emory (1997) colleges in Economics and Political Science. In 2001, he married Amy Elizabeth Noone and they have two daughters and a son; the couple filed for divorce in September 2018. Frederick's personal interests include sailing, alpine skiing, flying, and cycling.

== Political career ==
=== House of Delegates ===
Frederick was elected to the Virginia House of Delegates in November 2003 after defeating John A. "Jack" Rollison III, a 17-year incumbent Republican state legislator from Northern Virginia, in the June Republican primary with 58% of the vote. In the general election, he took the position that there was plenty of money in Richmond if adequately prioritized for transportation and pledged to cut waste from the state government, opposing tax increases for transportation improvements, such as funding for adding lanes to Interstate 95 or additional cars for the Virginia Railway Express, both of which were eventually achieved without an increase in transportation taxes.

Frederick is the first known Hispanic to be elected to any position in Virginia state government. First elected at age 28, he was also the youngest member of the legislature at that time.

He represented Eastern Prince William County in the Virginia General Assembly.

After his first year in the legislature, where he was the only freshmen in his House class to oppose Governor Mark Warner's historic increase in state taxes, Warner made Frederick a top target for defeat by state Democrats, tapping another long time Prince William politician in Hilda Barg, an 18-year Democratic member of the Prince William Board of Supervisors, who challenged Frederick.

Frederick was chosen to deliver the House Republican response to Governor Tim Kaine's State of the Commonwealth Address in January 2007.

In 2007, Frederick won re-election to a third term, with 59% of the vote in a strongly Democratic-leaning district. In this race Frederick received the endorsement of locally elected Democrats and unlikely organizations like the Virginia League of Conservation Voters.

Frederick has served on several boards and commissions, among them the Northern Virginia Transportation Authority, and the Virginia Small Business Commission, where he was Chairman.

On February 13, 2009, Frederick announced that he would not run for another House term, keeping a promise he had previously made to not run if he became state party chairman, a job he won in May 2008. Frederick encouraged his wife Amy to run to replace him. Amy Frederick issued a statement on April 28 that she would not be a candidate.

==== Legislative history ====
In the legislature, Frederick had a conservative voting record yet worked frequently with Democrats. He had a number of significant legislative accomplishments, including major land-use reforms such as requiring traffic impact studies (Gov. Tim Kaine's signature transportation accomplishment) and providing local governments limited impact fee authority. He also sponsored Virginia's back-to-school sales tax holiday and co-sponsored legislation to eliminate the state sales tax on groceries. His legislation began Community College Transfer Grants to make a 4-year college education more affordable for low income students. As Vice-Chairman of the Virginia Small Business Commission, he sponsored legislation to create small business health insurance pooling, and in 2009 as Chairman of the Commission, carried a bill to make no-mandate health insurance available so more small businesses could afford health care for their employees. Early in his tenure, he successfully lobbied for significant increases in transportation funding for his district. Frederick has also passed a number of bills related to military personnel, including providing in-state tuition to active-duty military dependents and extending all tax and government deadlines to deployed personnel. He has said that his proudest achievement is the passage of his bill to expand the number of metabolic tests given to newborn children, which has saved a number of lives.

===== Legislative scores =====
Frederick has a record that includes both honors and awards and criticism from organizations that rate the performance of legislators.

- The National Federation of Independent Business gave Frederick a 100% score on its report card several years during his tenure in the House of Delegates and an endorsement of Frederick in his 2011 senate run.
- The National Right to Work Committee awarded Frederick their Senator Paul Fannin Legislator of the Year Award.
- The Virginia League of Conservation Voters named Frederick a "Legislative Hero" in 2007 and in 2008.
- The Prince William Taxpayers Alliance named Frederick a "Friend of the Taxpayer".
- The March of Dimes named Frederick Legislator of the Year in 2005 for his work on the Virginia newborn screening expansion.
- The Virginia Foundation for Research and Economic Education, Inc. (Virginia FREE) rated Frederick's 2009 record in the House of Delegates with a cumulative business rating of 54, a 45 for stewardship, and a 57 as an advocate for business. The significance of Virginia FREE ratings had been challenged by some Virginia legislators.

=== Republican Party of Virginia ===
In 2008, Frederick ran for Chairman of the Republican Party of Virginia (RPV) against the will of the state's Republican establishment. Frederick challenged former Lt. Governor John H. Hager, the incumbent chairman and father of Henry Hager, son-in-law to President George W. Bush. He won the Chairmanship in a May 31, 2008, state convention, capturing a rumored 60% of the vote and winning 9 of 11 congressional districts, with the actual figure being unannounced due to Hager appearing on the convention stage and requesting Frederick be elected by acclamation. The following year, he was removed from the position by the party's central governing body, after a series of disputed allegations characterized as "a thin case that one can only suspect there were other motives behind Frederick's demise." It was proposed that Frederick's election and later removal represented a conflict within the party between insiders and outsiders (or grassroots versus establishment). After his removal, Frederick considered seeking the chairman job again at the party's 2009 convention, but later declined.

=== Senate election ===
On August 23, 2011, Frederick defeated Tito Muñoz in the Republican primary to challenge Senator Linda T. "Toddy" Puller for a seat in the Senate of Virginia. Frederick was defeated in the general election on November 8, 2011, winning in Prince William County and Stafford County, but losing significantly in Puller's home county of Fairfax.

=== Electoral history ===
Date	Election	Candidate	Party	Votes	%
Virginia House of Delegates, 52nd district
June 10, 2003	Republican primary	J M Frederick		1,541	58.04
June 10, 2003	Republican primary	J A Rollinson III		1,114	41.96
June 10, 2003	Republican primary	Incumbent lost in primary			
November 4, 2003	General	J M Frederick	Republican	5,384	56.70
November 4, 2003	General	C F Taylor	Democratic	4,100	43.18
November 4, 2003	General	Write Ins		11	0.12
November 4, 2003	General	Republicans held seat			
November 8, 2005	General	J M Frederick	Republican	7,182	51.11
November 8, 2005	General	H M Barg	Democratic	6,842	48.69
November 8, 2005	General	Write Ins		29	0.21
November 6, 2007	General	Jeffrey M. Frederick	Republican	6,864	58.62
November 6, 2007	General	Christopher K. Brown	Democratic	4,822	41.18
November 6, 2007	General	Write Ins		23	0.19
Senate of Virginia, 36th district
August 23, 2011	Republican primary	Jeffrey M. Frederick		3,670	68.64
August 23, 2011	Republican primary	Tito A. Munoz		1,676	31.35
November 8, 2011	General	Linda T. "Toddy" Puller	Democratic	16,649	55.20
November 8, 2011	General	Jeffrey M. Frederick	Republican	13,445	45.57
November 8, 2011	General	Write Ins		67	0.22
November 8, 2011	General	Democratic incumbent held seat			

== See also ==
- "Virginia House of Delegates 2009; Delegate Jeffrey M. Frederick".
- "Virginia State Board of Elections; Election Information; Election Results". Archived from the original on June 17, 2010.
- "Virginia Public Access Project; Jeffrey Frederick".
