= Pierce Homer =

Former Virginia Secretary of Transportation

11th Virginia Secretary of Transportation
- In office April 1, 2005 – January 16, 2010
- Governor: Mark Warner; Tim Kaine
- Preceded by: Whittington W. Clement
- Succeeded by: Sean Connaughton

Personal details
- Born: Pierce Robinson Homer; January 25, 1956 (age 70)
- Party: Democratic
- Spouse: Stacy Lee Luks
- Education: Haverford College; University of Texas at Austin

Pierce Robinson Homer (born January 25, 1956) is a former Virginia Secretary of Transportation, serving from 2005 to 2010 under Governors Mark Warner and Tim Kaine. He was previously Deputy Secretary of Transportation from 2002 to 2005.

Homer attended Haverford College and the University of Texas, where he earned a master's in public affairs. He served in Prince William County government from January 1987 until 2002, when he was named Virginia Deputy Secretary of Transportation by incoming governor Mark Warner.

Political offices
Preceded by Whittington W. Clement	Virginia Secretary of Transportation; 2005–2010	Succeeded by Sean Connaughton
