= Lee J. Carter =

American politician (born 1987)

Lee Carter
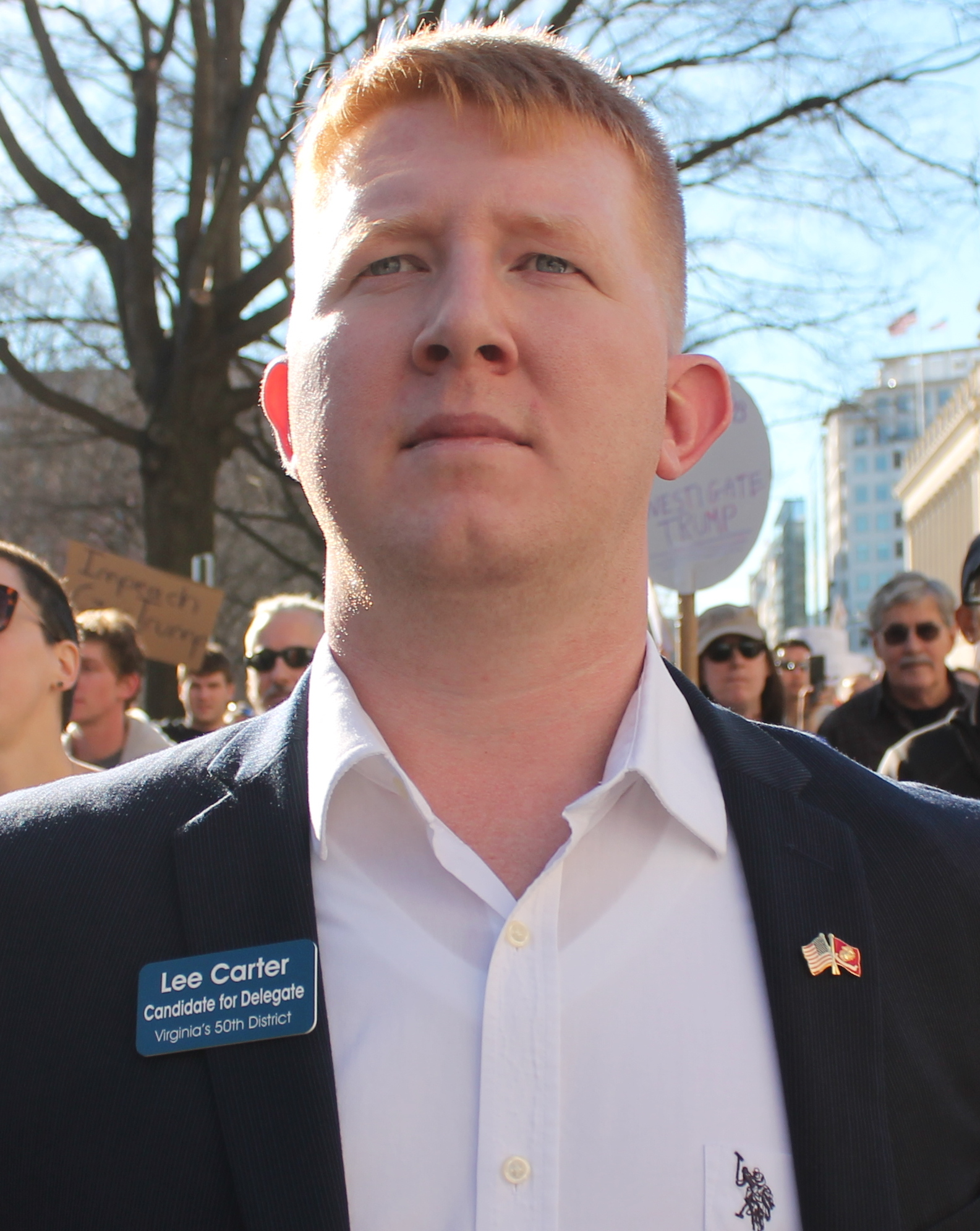
- Carter in 2017

Member of the Virginia House of Delegates from the 50th district
- In office January 10, 2018 – January 12, 2022
- Preceded by: Jackson Miller
- Succeeded by: Michelle Maldonado

Personal details
- Born: Lee Jin Carter; June 2, 1987 (age 39) Elizabeth City, North Carolina, U.S.
- Party: Democratic (before 2022); Independent (2022–present)
- Domestic partner: Violet Rae
- Children: 2
- Education: Northern Virginia Community College (AAS)

Military service
- Branch/service: United States Marine Corps
- Years of service: 2006–2011
- Unit: 22nd Marine Expeditionary Unit

Lee Jin Carter (born June 2, 1987) is an American former politician who represented the 50th district in the Virginia House of Delegates from 2018 to 2022. A member of the Democratic Party, he defeated Jackson Miller, the Republican House Majority Whip, to win the seat.

Born in North Carolina, Carter is an IT specialist and a former U.S. Marine. The first openly socialist state delegate in the United States since 1929, Carter served on the Finance Committee and the Militia, Police and Public Safety Committee. In 2017, he was endorsed by the Democratic Socialists of America (DSA), of which he was then a member.

As a Marine, Carter went to Kuwait and the Mediterranean. His unit, the 22nd Marine Expeditionary Unit, was also one of the first to respond to the 2010 Haiti earthquake. In 2021, Carter ran for governor of Virginia in the 2021 election. He came in fifth of the five candidates in the Democratic primary with less than 3% of the vote, losing to Terry McAuliffe, and also lost the primary for renomination for his House seat.

== Early life and military career ==
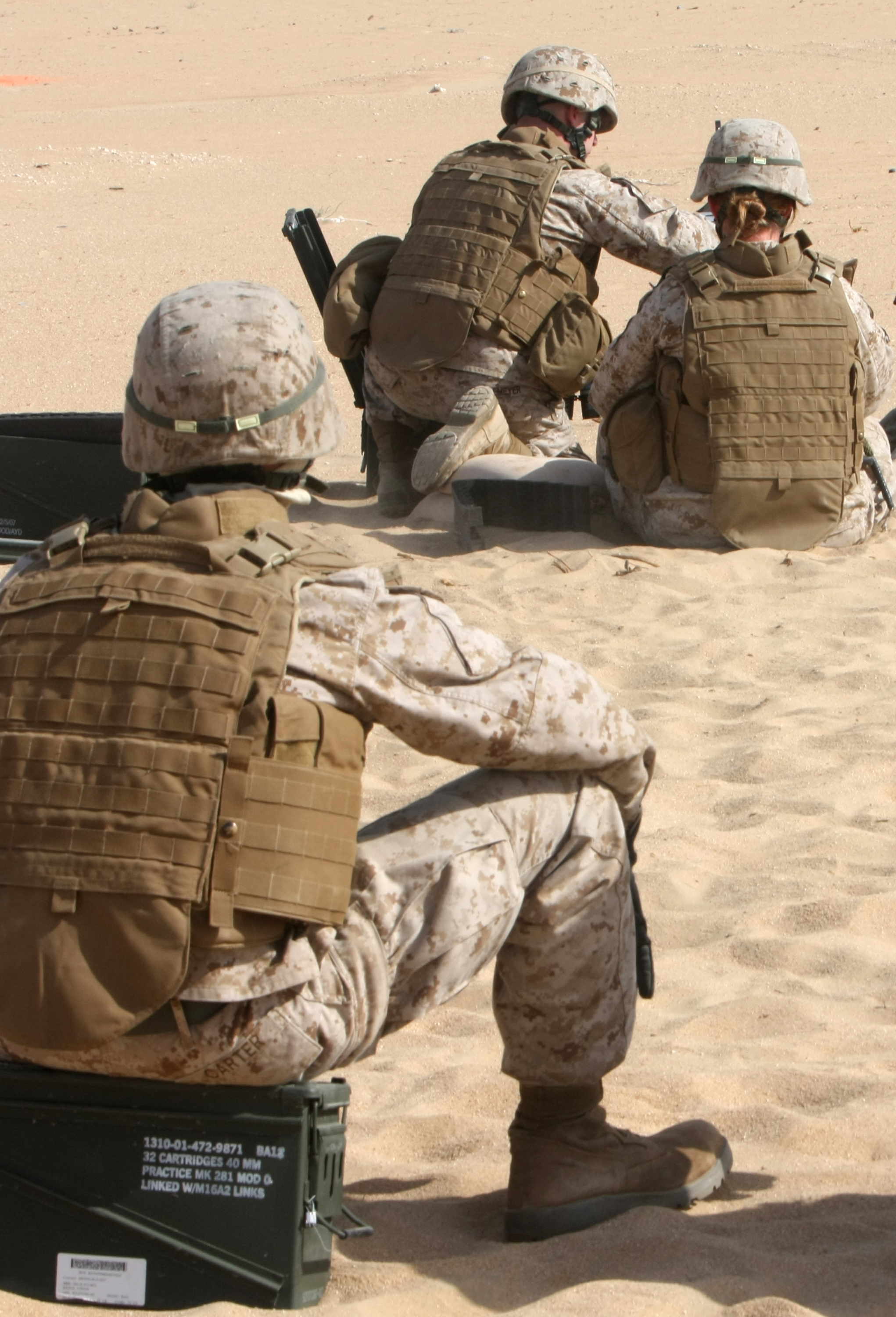
Carter (front) with the 22nd Marine Expeditionary Unit in Kuwait in 2009

Lee Jin Carter was born June 2, 1987, in Elizabeth City, North Carolina. He was a member of the United States Marine Corps (USMC) from 2006 to 2011, having attended the USMC Staff Noncommissioned Officer Academy. During his time in the U.S. Marine Corps, Carter completed tours in the Middle East and the Mediterranean. His unit, the 22nd Marine Expeditionary Unit, was also one of the first to respond to the 2010 earthquake in Haiti.

Carter earned an associate of applied science degree from the Northern Virginia Community College in 2017. He worked as an IT specialist before running for office.

== Political career ==
=== 2017 campaign ===
Carter was inspired to run for office after receiving a shock while repairing a lighting system in the summer of 2015 and subsequently struggling to receive worker's compensation from Virginia while unable to work. Before choosing to run, he had long identified as "to the left of where the Democratic party [is]" but was further inspired by Bernie Sanders to explore democratic socialism.

Carter ran for the Virginia House of Delegates for the 50th district. He was endorsed by the Democratic Socialists of America (DSA), of which he has been a member since April 2017. His campaign mostly focused on issues such as single-payer healthcare and financial contributions to politicians. Jackson Miller, the incumbent Republican, distributed a mailer campaign that compared Carter to Communist rulers Vladimir Lenin, Joseph Stalin, and Mao Zedong, an act the Democratic Party of Virginia condemned as fearmongering. Miller called Carter an "anti-jobs candidate", and said his "ideas are so out of the mainstream, and so incredibly expensive". During the campaign, Carter claimed he had little support from the state's Democratic Party, saying their resources were "stretched thin" but that the DSA had "managed to knock on thousands of doors" on his behalf. On November 7, 2017, Carter won the race by nine percentage points. He was one of 15 DSA members elected in 2017.

=== 2019 campaign ===
Carter ran for reelection in the 2019 election, defeating his primary opponent, Manassas city councilman Mark Wolfe, by 57.7% to 42.3% of the vote.

In the general election, Carter defeated Republican Ian Lovejoy, another Manassas city councilman, by 53.3% to 46.5% of the vote. Carter was endorsed by U.S. Senator Bernie Sanders, who campaigned with Carter in Manassas the day before the election.

=== 2021 campaigns ===
On January 1, 2021, Carter announced his candidacy for the Democratic nomination for governor of Virginia. He also ran for renomination as delegate but had two challengers. Carter lost both the gubernatorial primary and the Democratic primary for delegate, the latter of which was won by attorney Michelle Maldonado. After the losses, he announced his retirement from electoral politics and endorsed the Independent candidate Princess Blanding for governor.

=== Tenure ===
During Carter's remarks on a tax bill during the 2018 legislative session, fellow Democratic Delegate Mark Keam briefly displayed the hammer and sickle on a laptop behind Carter, an action for which he later apologized; Keam also apologized for violating Rule 57 in regard to the legislative body's decorum ("No member shall in debate use any language or gesture calculated to wound, offend, or insult another member"). Carter dismissed the affair as "clearly ... a joke, but ... in very poor taste and rooted in a lack of knowledge about the history of the political left."

== Political positions ==
=== Capital punishment ===
Carter opposes the death penalty under all circumstances, and introduced a bill in the House of Delegates to abolish it in Virginia.

=== Criminal justice reform ===
Carter introduced legislation in the 2020 session that would prohibit Virginia prisons and jails from strip-searching minors before visitation. The bill passed unanimously in subcommittee.

=== Guns ===
Carter supports the right to keep and bear arms, and has opposed proposed assault weapons bans in Virginia as a "terrible idea". He opposes red flag laws, since he believes they result in right-wing extremists abusing the process to disarm their opposition, and has voted against prohibiting guns on the property of the Virginia State Capitol, the only Democrat to do so.

=== Healthcare ===
Carter introduced legislation in the 2020 session that would cap the monthly copay for insulin at $30. The bill passed and was signed into law at a $50 monthly copay cap.

==== Autism ====
Carter is autistic, and opposes public funding for applied behavior analysis in the treatment of autism, a controversial therapy when used to attempt to treat the condition. He has likened ABA to conversion therapy. Carter said in a statement that "There is zero difference between ABA and punishing deaf kids to make them read lips instead of signing. Which is what institutions used to do to them decades ago." Carter opposes Autism Speaks, and has called the organization a hate group.

=== Education ===
Carter was the only Democrat to vote against a bipartisan bill in 2021 to require schools to provide at least three specialized student support positions. The bill passed and was signed by Governor Ralph Northam.

=== Labor ===
In office, Carter was an outspoken advocate for workers' rights. In December 2018 he introduced House Bill 1806, which would overturn Virginia's 70-year-old right-to-work law. Of the bill, Carter said, "When workers form a union, everyone in the workplace benefits from higher wages and better conditions. ... Taft–Hartley was created specifically to allow some people to stand opposed to their coworkers' union while still reaping the rewards for free. It was intentionally designed to bankrupt unions, and I'm fighting to end it."

In late 2019, after Carter introduced or supported bills overturning restrictions on the ability of Virginia state employees to strike, he received a wave of death threats on social media, as critics mistook the exception of police officers from the bills for a case of their right to strike being removed. These threats were severe and credible enough that Carter spent the day at an undisclosed safe location on January 20, 2020, the day a gun rights rally was organized at the Virginia State Capitol. This coincided with the declaration of a state of emergency by Northam in response to potential violence at the rally.

In the 2020 session, Carter introduced a bill to address pay disparities for certain categories of workers. One bill would prevent employers from categorizing employees as "tipped employees" if state or federal regulations prohibit those employees from accepting tips. This bill targeted workers at Dulles International Airport and Reagan National Airport, who are classified as tipped employees and are ineligible from receiving minimum wage even though they are prohibited from receiving tips.

=== 2020 presidential election ===
Carter endorsed Bernie Sanders for president in 2020, and co-chaired his Virginia campaign.

== Personal life ==
Carter has been married and divorced three times. He has a daughter with his second wife. In October 2018, to get ahead of any potential attempts at "personal smears", Carter admitted making "homophobic, transphobic, sometimes sexist or racially insensitive" comments online as a teenager.

On July 2, 2021, Carter's longtime partner Violet Rae announced their engagement on Twitter.

While serving as a Virginia delegate, Carter also worked as a Lyft driver. He is a Unitarian Universalist.

Carter is autistic, and has expressed positions belonging to the Autism Rights Movement.

== Electoral history ==
Date	Election	Candidate	Party	Votes	%
Virginia House of Delegates, 50th district
November 7, 2017	General	Lee J. Carter	Democratic	11,366	54.32
November 7, 2017	General	Jackson Miller	Republican	9,518	45.49
June 11, 2019	Primary	Lee J. Carter	Democratic	1,441	57.73
June 11, 2019	Primary	Mark Wolfe	Democratic	1,055	42.27
November 5, 2019	General	Lee J. Carter	Democratic	10,693	53.25
November 5, 2019	General	Ian T. Lovejoy	Republican	9,333	46.48
June 8, 2021	Primary	Lee J. Carter	Democratic	1,348	38.37
June 8, 2021	Primary	Michelle E. Lopes-Maldonado	Democratic	1,548	44.06
June 8, 2021	Primary	Helen Anne Zurita	Democratic	617	17.56
Governor of Virginia
June 8, 2021	Primary	Lee J. Carter	Democratic	13,525	2.8
June 8, 2021	Primary	Terry McAuliffe	Democratic	303,546	62.2
June 8, 2021	Primary	Jennifer Carroll Foy	Democratic	96,609	19.8
June 8, 2021	Primary	Jennifer McClellan	Democratic	57,325	11.7
June 8, 2021	Primary	Justin Fairfax	Democratic	17,349	3.6

== See also ==
- List of Bernie Sanders 2020 presidential campaign endorsements
- List of Democratic Socialists of America members who have held office in the United States
