= Kenneth E. Calvert =

American politician (1928–2020)

Kenneth Calvert

Member of the Virginia House of Delegates
- In office January 13, 1982 – January 13, 1988
- Preceded by: Calvin W. Fowler
- Succeeded by: Whitt Clement
- Constituency: 13th district (1982‍–‍1983); 20th district (1983‍–‍1988)

Personal details
- Born: Kenneth Elsworth Calvert; October 10, 1928 Danville, Virginia, U.S.
- Died: September 27, 2020 (aged 91) Danville, Virginia, U.S.
- Party: Republican
- Spouse: Billie Deane Edwards
- Education: Virginia Tech (BS)

Military service
- Branch/service: United States Army
- Years of service: 1946–1947; 1951–1952
- Battles/wars: Korean War

Kenneth Elsworth Calvert (October 10, 1928 – September 27, 2020) was an American politician of the Republican Party. He served in the Virginia House of Delegates after his election in 1981 alongside Charles R. Hawkins and William A. Beeton Jr. After judicially-mandated redrawing of the state's multi-member House districts, he ran in the new 20th district, where he served until being defeated for reelection by Whitt Clement in 1987.
