= Stanley A. Owens =

American politician (1907–1984)

Member of the Virginia House of Delegates from the Prince William, sometimes with Stafford County or Loudoun County district
- In office January 13, 1960 – January 13, 1976
- Preceded by: Frank P. Moncure
- Succeeded by: Floyd C. Bagley

Personal details
- Born: February 10, 1907 Canon, Georgia, U.S.
- Died: November 30, 1984 (aged 77) Manassas, Virginia, U.S.
- Party: Democratic
- Spouse: Janet
- Education: Emory University; University of Georgia School of Law

Stanley Albert Owens (February 10, 1907 – November 30, 1984) was a Virginia lawyer and Democratic politician who served part-time as a member of the Virginia House of Delegates, representing Prince William County, Virginia for 15 years, initially with Stafford County and eventually (along with other delegates), Loudoun County.

== Early and family life ==
Born in Canon, Georgia, Owens received law degrees from Emory University (J.D.) and from the University of Georgia School of Law (LLM). He married his wife Janet, and was eventually buried next to her in Gainesville, Virginia.

== Career ==
Owens was elected Commonwealth Attorney (prosecutor) for Prince William County. He was among the seven original founding members of the Prince William County Bar Association, all of whom had offices near the county seat in Manassas, Virginia.

When delegate Frank P. Moncure, a former Commonwealth attorney for Stafford County and who had represented both Prince William and Stafford Counties for more than two decades, announced his retirement in 1959 during the Massive Resistance crisis, Owens ran to succeed him.

He was re-elected numerous times. As delegate, Owens worked with other Northern Virginia legislators to create Dulles Airport as well as George Mason University. His district was initially titled "Prince William and Stafford Counties" and given the numeric designation 58th, but in the November 1963 election following reapportionment as a result of the 1960 census it was renumbered 57th and only included Prince William County. When the U.S. Supreme Court overturned that reapportionment in Davis v. Mann (1964) as unconstitutionally disfavoring northern Virginia, reapportionment effective in the November 1965 election grouped Loudoun and Prince William counties as the 42nd house district; Owens continued to serve, now alongside Lucas D. Phillips for three terms until the 1971 election, when the district now renumbered the 20th received two additional delegates and William R. Murphy and Kenneth B. Rollins joined Owens and Phillips. However the redistricting effective in the 1973 election eliminated one delegate, Phillips. All three of the delegates changed after the 1975 elections when the district now designated the 41st linked Loudoun County to only the cities of Manassas and Manassas Park in Prince William County, and Floyd C. Bagley, Earl E. Bell and David G. Brickley were elected.

Virginia House of Delegates
Preceded by Frank P. Moncure	Virginia Delegate for Prince William County; 1960-1975	Succeeded by Floyd C. Bagley
