= Calvin W. Fowler =

American lawyer and politician

Member of the Virginia House of Delegates
- In office February 26, 1969 – January 13, 1982
- Preceded by: Dan Daniel
- Succeeded by: Kenneth E. Calvert
- Constituency: 12th district (1969‍–‍1970); 25th district (1970‍–‍1972); 14th district (1972‍–‍1982)

Personal details
- Born: Calvin Wooding Fowler; July 29, 1935 (age 90) Danville, Virginia, U.S.
- Party: Democratic
- Other political affiliations: Independent (1968‍–‍1971; 1973‍–‍1977)
- Spouse: Barbara Tyler Childrey
- Parent: Clinton A. Fowler (father)
- Education: University of Virginia

Military service
- Branch/service: United States Army
- Years of service: 1961–1963

Calvin Wooding Fowler Sr. (born July 29, 1935) is an American lawyer and politician who served as a member of the Virginia House of Delegates.

In 1965, he joined the law firm of Sanford & Clement (today Clement & Wheatley), after serving as assistant commonwealth's attorney in Danville. The son of former Delegate Clinton A. Fowler, he was first elected to the House in 1969 to succeed Dan Daniel, who resigned following his election to Congress.
