= Clinton A. Fowler =

American lawyer and politician

Member of the Virginia House of Delegates for Pittsylvania and City of Danville
- In office January 13, 1932 – January 10, 1934 Serving with Langhorne Jones and Maitland Bustard
- Preceded by: A. Lovell Witcher
- Succeeded by: Charles J. Ashworth

Personal details
- Born: Clinton Arlando Fowler; January 30, 1898 Burlington, North Carolina, U.S.
- Died: September 22, 1972 (aged 74) Danville, Virginia, U.S.
- Party: Democratic
- Spouse: Kathleen Barker
- Children: 3, including Calvin
- Education: University of North Carolina

Military service
- Branch/service: United States Army
- Battles/wars: World War I

Clinton Arlando Fowler (January 30, 1898 – September 22, 1972) was an American lawyer and politician who served as a member of the Virginia House of Delegates during the General Assembly's 1932 and special 1933 sessions. A resident of Ringgold, he represented the district composed of Pittsylvania and the City of Danville.
