= Dan Daniel (politician) =

American politician (1914–1988)

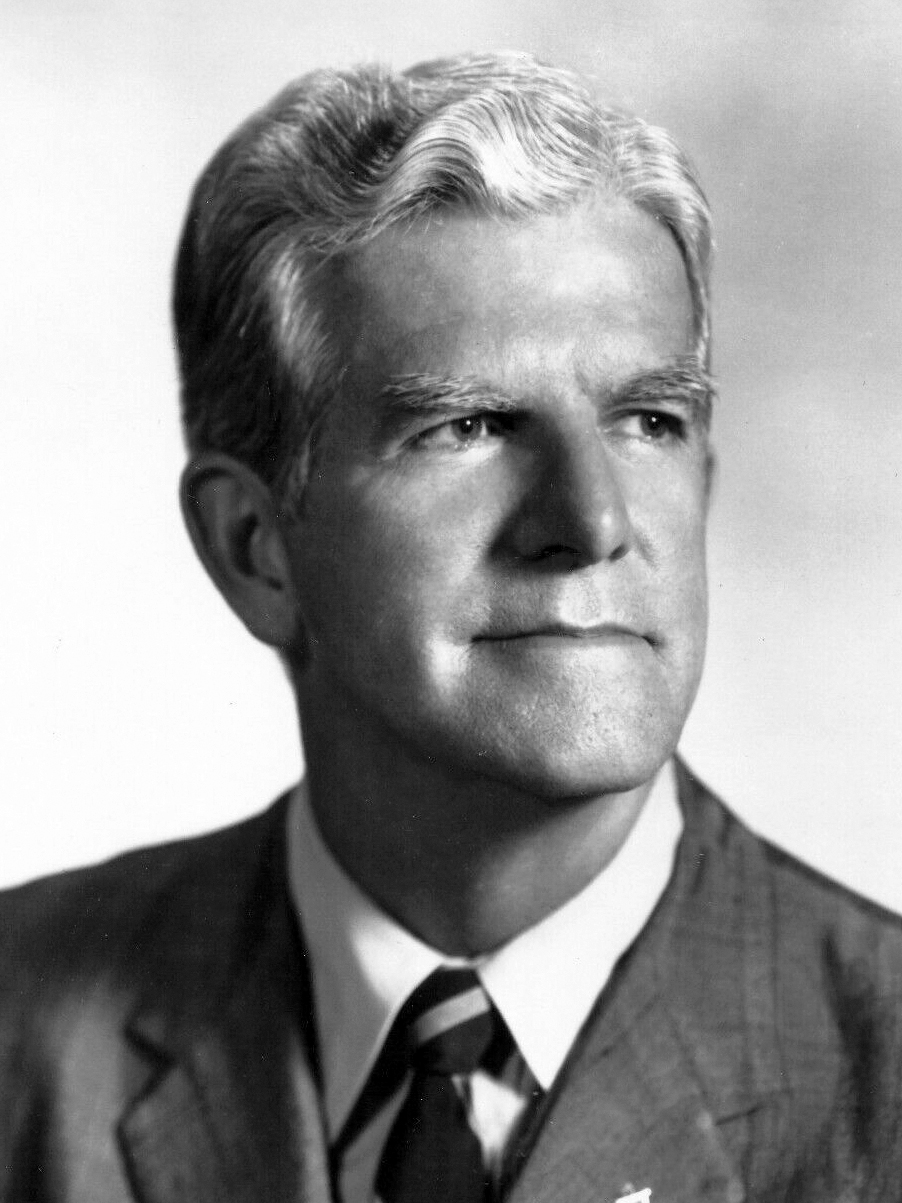

Member of the U.S. House of Representatives from Virginia's 5th district
- In office January 3, 1969 – January 23, 1988
- Preceded by: William M. Tuck
- Succeeded by: Lewis F. Payne, Jr.

Member of the Virginia House of Delegates from Danville City
- In office January 13, 1960 – November 25, 1968
- Preceded by: C. Stuart Wheatley
- Succeeded by: Calvin W. Fowler

National Commander of The American Legion
- In office 1956–1957
- Preceded by: J. Addington Wagner
- Succeeded by: John S. Gleason, Jr.

Personal details
- Born: Wilbur Clarence Daniel; May 12, 1914 Chatham, Virginia, U.S.
- Died: January 23, 1988 (aged 73) Charlottesville, Virginia, U.S.
- Resting place: Highland Burial Park; Danville, Virginia; 36°37′58.9″N 79°23′22.9″W
- Party: Democratic
- Spouses: Daisy Fines (m. 1934–1939) Ruby McGregor (m. 1939)
- Children: 1
- Education: Dan River Textile School
- Occupation: Businessman
- Awards: French Order of Merit; Order of the Star of Italian Solidarity, 1st Class

Military service
- Allegiance: United States
- Branch/service: United States Navy
- Dan Daniel's voice Daniel commemorates the 40th anniversary of the G.I. Bill of Rights; Recorded June 21, 1984

Wilbur Clarence "Dan" Daniel (May 12, 1914 – January 23, 1988) was a member of the U.S. House of Representatives from Virginia, serving ten terms from 1969 until his death from a heart attack in Charlottesville in 1988.

He previously served as the National Commander of The American Legion from 1956 to 1957.

== Life ==
Daniel was born in Chatham, Virginia on May 12, 1914. He grew up on a tobacco farm in Mecklenburg County. He was educated in Virginia schools, and was a graduate of Dan River Textile School, Danville, Virginia. Danville, on the Dan River, was at the time a center for the tobacco and textile industries. The name of the school references the Dan River textile mill, which was founded in 1883 and closed in 2006.

=== Dan River Mills ===
From 1939 to 1968, except for a period of service in the U.S. Navy during World War II era, he was associated with Dan River Mills (present day Dan River, Inc.), the textile industry that operated a mill on the Dan River. He advanced through the ranks of the textile business to become assistant to the chairman of the board at Dan River Mills.

=== American Legion ===
He was elected commander of The American Legion's Department of Virginia in 1951, and National Commander in 1956.

=== Political career ===
He was elected to the Virginia House of Delegates from 1959 to 1968, was President of the Virginia Chamber of Commerce in 1968, and was a permanent member of the President's People-to-People Committee (now People to People International).

He was elected as a Democrat to the 91st United States Congress and to nine succeeding congresses, serving from January 3, 1969, until his death from a heart attack in January 1988. He was a conservative Democrat, receiving a score of 89.71% from the American Conservative Union.

=== Death ===
He died at the University of Virginia Medical Center in Charlottesville, on January 23, 1988, from an aortic dissection. He was interred in Highland Burial Park in Danville, Virginia.

== Electoral history ==
- 1968; Daniel was elected to the U.S. House of Representatives with 54.59% of the vote, defeating Republican Weldon W. Tuck and Independent Ruth L. Harvey.
- 1970; Daniel was re-elected with 73.03% of the vote, defeating Republican Allen T. St. Clair.
- 1972; Daniel was re-elected unopposed.
- 1974; Daniel was re-elected unopposed.
- 1976; Daniel was re-elected unopposed.
- 1978; Daniel was re-elected unopposed.
- 1980; Daniel was re-elected unopposed.
- 1982; Daniel was re-elected unopposed.
- 1984; Daniel was re-elected unopposed.
- 1986; Daniel was re-elected with 81.54% of the vote, defeating Independent J.F. Cole.

== See also ==
- List of foreign recipients of the National Order of Merit
- List of people from Virginia
- List of United States representatives from Virginia
- List of members of the United States Congress who died in office (1950–1999)

Non-profit organization positions
Preceded by J. Addington Wagner	National Commander of The American Legion; 1956 – 1957	Succeeded by John S. Gleason Jr.
Virginia House of Delegates
Preceded by C. Stuart Wheatley	Member of the Virginia House of Delegates from Danville; 1960 – 1968	Succeeded by Calvin W. Fowler
U.S. House of Representatives
Preceded by William M. Tuck	Member of the U.S. House of Representatives from Virginia's 5th congressional district 1969 – 1988	Succeeded by Lewis F. Payne, Jr.
