= Whittington W. Clement =

American politician

Whitt Clement

10th Virginia Secretary of Transportation
- In office January 14, 2002 – April 1, 2005
- Governor: Mark Warner
- Preceded by: Shirley Ybarra
- Succeeded by: Pierce Homer

Member of the Virginia House of Delegates from the 20th district
- In office January 13, 1988 – January 9, 2002
- Preceded by: Kenneth E. Calvert
- Succeeded by: Chris Saxman

Personal details
- Born: November 15, 1947 (age 78) Danville, Virginia, U.S.
- Party: Democratic
- Spouse: Margaret Clay Irby
- Education: University of Virginia (BA, JD)

Whittington Whiteside "Whitt" Clement (born November 15, 1947) is a Virginia lawyer and Democratic politician who served seven terms in the Virginia House of Delegates (1988–2002) and also became the Virginia Secretary of Transportation under Governor Mark Warner.

Born in Danville, Clement attended the local City of Danville public schools and Episcopal High School in Alexandria, Virginia during the Commonwealth's Massive Resistance crisis. He then received both his undergraduate and legal degrees from the University of Virginia (as well as a distinguished student award in 1970 and a Raven Award) before clerking with U.S. District Judge John A. MacKenzie in Norfolk.

Clement then established a private legal practice in Danville. He also became active in the local Kiwanis Club, Chamber of Commerce, Danville Estate Planning Council, Virginia Bar association (eventually serving a term as president), and Virginia's State Council of Higher Education (1985–1987)

In 1987, Clement defeated veteran Republican Kenneth E. Calvert for a seat in the Virginia House of Delegates representing part of Pittsylvania County and the City of Danville, and won re-election many times to that part-time position.

In 2001, Clement sought the Democratic nomination for Attorney General of Virginia but placed third in the primary behind Donald McEachin and John Edwards. McEachin would go on to lose the general election to Republican Jerry Kilgore in the same year.

In 2003, the Virginia Bar Association honored him with its Distinguished Service Award. After retiring from the legislature, Clement continued his legal practice Clement & Wheatley, LLC, and later became a special counsel with Hunton Andrews Kurth, with a practice focused on government affairs and lobbying.

Virginia House of Delegates
Preceded by Kenneth E. Calvert	Virginia Delegate for the 20th District; 1988–2002	Succeeded by Chris Saxman
Political offices
Preceded by Shirley Ybarra	Virginia Secretary of Transportation; 2002–2005	Succeeded by Pierce Homer
Academic offices
Preceded by James B. Murray Jr.	Rector of the University of Virginia; 2021–2023	Succeeded by Robert D. Hardie
