= Northern Virginia Transportation Authority =

Logo of the NVTA

The Northern Virginia Transportation Authority (NVTA) is a regional governmental entity established to plan, prioritize and fund regional transportation programs. The NVTA covers Arlington, Fairfax, Loudoun and Prince William counties and the cities of Alexandria, Fairfax, Falls Church, Manassas and Manassas Park.

The Authority is responsible for long range transportation project planning, prioritization and funding for regional transportation projects in Northern Virginia. The NVTA's policies and priorities are guided by two overarching goals: reduce congestion and move the greatest number of people in the most cost-effective manner. These two goals are combined with performance-based criteria such as the ability to improve travel times, reduce delays, connect regional activity centers, and improve safety and air quality. The Authority works toward regional consensus when setting regional transportation policies and priorities for transportation projects. The Authority is also charged with developing and updating the long range regional transportation plan for Northern Virginia, TransAction.

== Early Legislative History ==
The first legislative reference to a Northern Virginia Transportation Authority was Senate Joint Resolution No. 324 (SJR 324), "Establishing a Joint Subcommittee to Study Creation of a Northern Virginia Transportation Authority" filed by chief patron Senator Charles Waddell, Loudoun County, Senate Transportation Committee Chair, in the 1995 Virginia Legislative session on January 23, 1995. Co-patrons of the bill were Senators Andrews, Howell, Marsh and Saslaw. The bill was drafted by Raymond Pelletier, Leesburg, Virginia and filed by Senator Waddell at Pelletier's request.

In the face of opposition by Northern Virginia Transportation Coordinating Council the bill was "amended in the nature of a substitute" on February 6, 1995 by Senate Joint Resolution No. 324, "Requesting the Transportation Coordinating Council of Northern Virginia to study regional transportation planning in Northern Virginia". The bill passed the Senate, but failed to pass the House on February 25, 1995.

Five years later on January 20, 2000 Senate Joint Resolution No. 121, (SJR 121) "Establishing a joint subcommittee to study creation of a Northern Virginia Regional Transportation Authority" was filed by chief patron Senator Warren Barry, Fairfax County, Senate Transportation Committee Chair at the request of Raymond Pelletier, Leesburg, Virginia. Co-patrons of the bill were Senators: Barry, Byrne, Colgan, Howell, Marsh, Mims, Puller, Saslaw, Schrock, Ticer, Watkins and Williams; and Delegates: Abbitt, Dillard, McClure, McQuigg, Moran, Plum, Scott, Spruill and Watts. The final bill, , was passed by the Senate and House on March 17, 2000.

Summary of the bill as passed: Study; Northern Virginia Regional Transportation Authority. Creates a joint subcommittee to study the creation of a Northern Virginia Regional Transportation Authority. In conducting the study, the joint subcommittee shall determine the purpose, needs, benefits, authority, composition, responsibility, and funding of a Northern Virginia Regional Transportation Authority. Further, the joint subcommittee shall determine whether the powers and duties of the Northern Virginia Transportation Authority should include: (i) identifying transportation needs and possible solutions; (ii) determining the efficacy of privatizating such solutions; (iii) accepting, raising, and the disbursement of funds; (iv) the authority to sell bonds, and to buy, sell, hold, lease, and condemn property; and (v) designing, constructing, and maintaining transportation infrastructure or the ability to cause the design, construction, and maintenance of transportation infrastructure.

On June 28, 2000 the Study Committee members were appointed. They consisted of Senators: Warren E. Barry, Janet D. Howell, Bill Mims, Leslie L. Byrne; Delegates: John A. Rollison III, Robert G. Marshall, Roger J. McClure, John H. Rust, Jr., Vivian E. Watts, Brian J. Moran; and Citizens: Katherine K. Hanley, Christopher Zimmerman, James G. Burton, Ray Pelletier.

On January 17, 2001 Senator Bill Mims, Loudoun County, study committee member, introduced Senate Bill 1355 with co-patrons, Senators: Mims, Byrne, Howell, Puller, Saslaw and Williams; and Delegates: Albo, Amundson, Black, Bolvin, Callahan, Devolites, Dillard, Hull, Marshall, May, McClure, McQuigg, Moran, O'Brien, Parrish, Plum, Rollison, Rust, Scott and Watts.

Summary of the bill: Northern Virginia Transportation Authority. Establishes the Northern Virginia Transportation Authority to consolidate the roles of the Northern Virginia Transportation District Commission and other regional transportation entities. The Authority is given general responsibility for transportation projects, programs, and priorities for Northern Virginia, and is vested with the ability to issue bonds, subject to General Assembly approval.

The final bill, CHAPTER 48.1. NORTHERN VIRGINIA TRANSPORTATION AUTHORITY was approved in the Senate on February 5, 2001 (39-Y, 0-N) and subsequently by the House on February 20, 2001 (74-Y, 20-N).

On January 15, 2002 Senator Warrant Barry introduced Senate Bill No. 576, CHAPTER 48.2. NORTHERN VIRGINIA TRANSPORTATION AUTHORITY, which would repeal and replace Chapter 48.1 passed in 2001. The co-patrons were Senators: Barry, Byrne, Colgan, Howell, Potts, Puller, Saslaw, Ticer and Whipple; and Delegates: Amundson, Brink, Callahan, Moran, Parrish, Reese, Rollison, Scott and Watts.

Summary of the bill: Northern Virginia Transportation Authority. Revises statutory provisions dealing with the Northern Virginia Transportation Authority by substituting provisions recommended by the Joint Subcommittee Studying Creation of a Northern Virginia Regional Transportation Authority together with recommended modifications from the Governor, for 2001 legislation that created the Authority.

The bill was approved in the Senate, with recommendations of the Governor,(39-Y, 1-N), and in the House (80-Y, 17-N) on April 17, 2002 and signed by Governor Mark Warner effective July 1, 2002.

CHAPTER 48.2. established the NORTHERN VIRGINIA TRANSPORTATION AUTHORITY.

== History ==
The Virginia General Assembly created the NVTA in 2002. It is led by an appointed governing board with 14 voting members and two non-voting members. As a part of a 2007 comprehensive transportation legislative package, the new tax sources became available to the NVTA, including taxes from increasing the initial vehicle registration fee, a local vehicle-repair tax, an additional transient-occupancy tax, and a local rental-car transportation tax. The transportation package also authorized local governments to impose a real estate property tax surcharge to help fund the NVTA. Funds raised from such surcharges would be earmarked to be spent on pet political projects in each locality.

On February 29, 2008, the Virginia Supreme Court unanimously ruled that the 2007 transportation law was unconstitutional, in response to a case filed by State Del. Robert G. Marshall and numerous other residents. The Court ruled that the General Assembly could not delegate its taxing powers to an unelected body. On March 3, 2008, the NVTA announced the end to the collection of its fees and taxes and its intent to refund the taxes that had been collected since January 1, 2008.

On March 24, 2008, Virginia Governor Tim Kaine signed a law to authorize refunds of the estimated $13 million in fees collected by the NVTA since January 1, 2008.

On April 3, 2013, the Virginia General Assembly approved the final version of House Bill 2313 (HB 2313). This legislation established a dedicated, sustainable funding stream for transportation in Northern Virginia and allows the Authority to begin fulfilling its mission to address regional transportation challenges. HB 2313 separated these funds into "70% Regional Revenue," which is allocated by the Authority for regional transportation projects; and "30% Local Distribution Revenue," which is distributed to jurisdictions for their transportation projects and purposes.

== Members and committees ==
The Northern Virginia Transportation Authority has seventeen members as follows: the chief elected official, or his/her designee, of the nine cities and counties that are members of the Authority; two members of the House of Delegates appointed by the Speaker of the House; one member of the Senate appointed by the Senate Committee on Rules; and two citizens who reside in counties and cities embraced by the Authority, appointed by the Governor. In addition, the Director of the Virginia Department of Rail and Public Transportation, or his/her designee; the Commonwealth Transportation Commissioner, or his/her designee; and the chief elected officer of one town in a county which the Authority embraces serve as non-voting members of the Authority.

The NVTA has two statutory committees: Planning Coordination Advisory Committee and Technical Advisory Committee.

The NVTA has three standing committees: Finance Committee, Governance and Personnel Committee and Planning and Programming Committee.
