= Richard Bell (Virginia politician) =

American politician (born 1946)

Member of the Virginia House of Delegates from the 20th district
- In office January 13, 2010 – January 8, 2020
- Preceded by: Chris Saxman
- Succeeded by: John Avoli

Personal details
- Born: Richard Preston Bell; October 26, 1946 (age 79) Staunton, Virginia, U.S.
- Party: Republican
- Spouse: Anne Starr Littlejohn
- Education: James Madison University; Old Dominion University
- Profession: Teacher
- Committees: Natural Resources; Education; Health Welfare and Institutions

Richard Preston "Dickie" Bell (born October 26, 1946) is an American politician. He was a Republican member of the Virginia House of Delegates from 2010-2020, representing the 20th district, which includes parts of Augusta, Highland, and Rockingham counties, and the city of Staunton, where Bell resides.

Bell did not seek reelection in the 2019 election.

== Electoral history ==
Date	Election	Candidate	Party	Votes	%
Virginia House of Delegates, 20th district
Nov 3, 2009	General	Richard P. "Dickie" Bell	Republican	15,086	71.16
Nov 3, 2009	General	Erik D. Curren	Democratic	6,092	28.73
Nov 3, 2009	General	Write Ins		20	0.09
Nov 3, 2009	General	Chris Saxman did not seek reelection; seat stayed Republican			
Nov 8, 2011	General	Richard P. "Dickie" Bell	Republican	9,522	71.04
Nov 8, 2011	General	Laura L. Kleiner	Democratic	3,865	28.83
Nov 8, 2011	General	Write Ins		15	0.11
Nov 5, 2013	General	Richard P. "Dickie" Bell	Republican	16,712	95.93
Nov 5, 2013	General	Write Ins		709	4.07
Nov 3, 2015	General	Richard P. "Dickie" Bell	Republican	10,758	75.15
Nov 3, 2015	General	William M. Hammer	Libertarian	3,425	23.92
Nov 3, 2015	General	Write Ins		133	0.93
