= Jackson Miller =

American politician (born 1967)

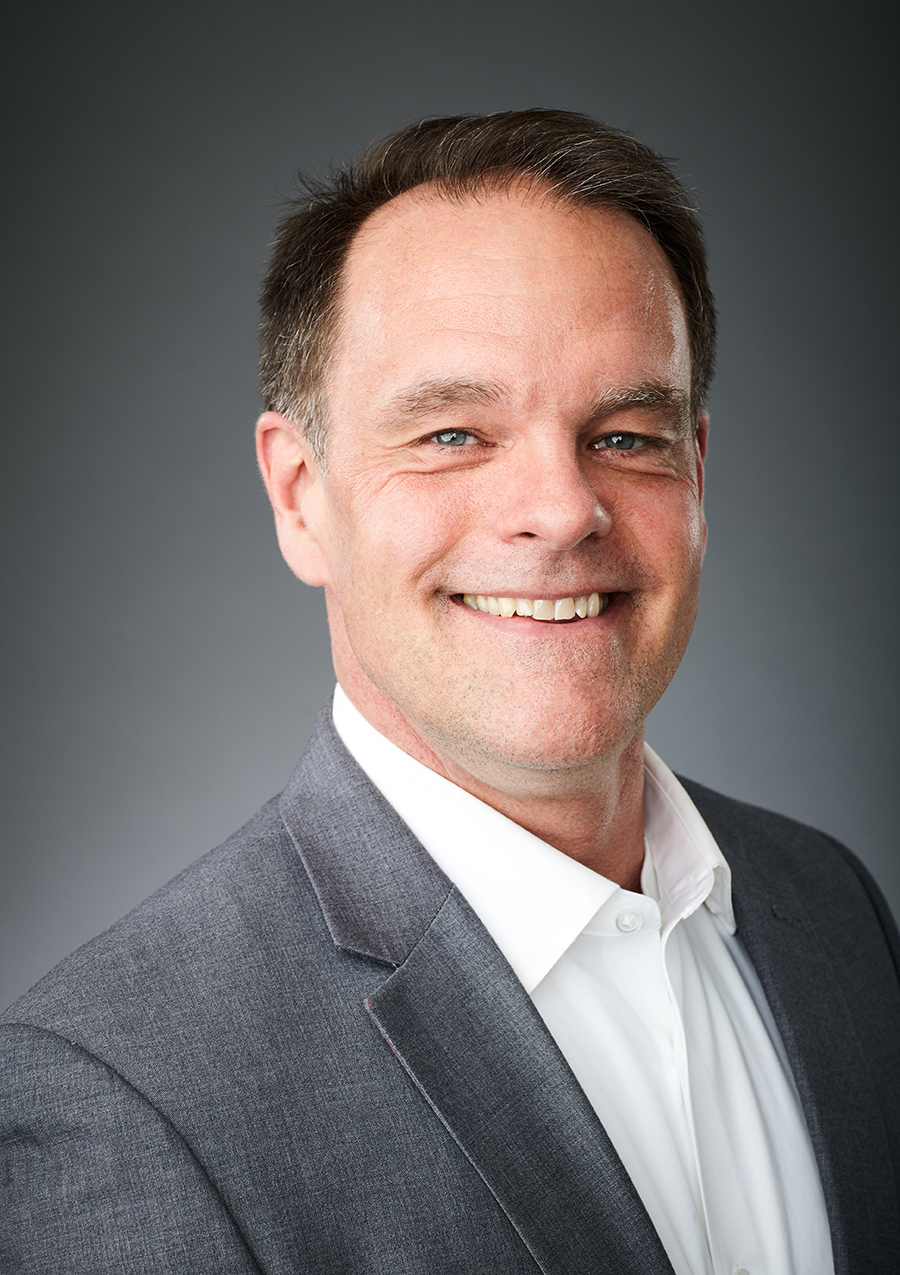

Member of the Virginia House of Delegates from the 50th district
- In office November 29, 2006 – January 10, 2018
- Preceded by: Harry Parrish
- Succeeded by: Lee Carter

Personal details
- Born: Jackson Hunter Miller; April 30, 1967 (age 59)
- Party: Republican
- Spouse(s): Suzanne Miller (m. 1994; died 2017); Amy Tobias
- Children: Jackson Jr. and Nathaniel
- Education: Virginia Commonwealth University
- Occupation: Director of Department of Criminal Justice Services, Real estate agent, Former Police Officer for Prince William County Police
- Committees: Commerce and Labor; Courts of Justice; Privileges and Elections

Military service
- Branch/service: United States Army
- Years of service: 1989–1999
- Rank: Captain
- Unit: United States Army Reserve

Jackson Hunter Miller (born April 30, 1967) is an American politician. In 2022, he was appointed by Governor Glenn Youngkin as the Director of the Department of Criminal Justice Services. From 2006 to 2018, he served in the Virginia House of Delegates representing the 50th district, made up of the city of Manassas and part of Prince William County in the suburbs of Washington, D.C. He is a member of the Republican Party, and was the House majority whip from 2012 to 2018. In the 2017 elections, Miller was defeated by Democratic socialist challenger Lee J. Carter in what was considered an upset.

Miller has served on the House committees on Commerce and Labor (2010–2018), Courts of Justice (2008–2018), General Laws (2008–2009), Privileges and Elections (2007–2018), and Science and Technology (2007–2009).

== Early life, education ==
Miller is a native Virginian. He attended W.T. Woodson High School in Fairfax County, Virginia, graduating in 1985. He received a B.S. degree in urban planning from Virginia Commonwealth University in 1990.

He served in the United States Army Reserve 1989–1999, attaining the rank of captain.

== Electoral history ==
In May 2004 Miller ran for a four-year term on the nonpartisan Manassas city council. In a race for three available seats, he finished third among four candidates.

On March 28, 2006, 84-year-old Republican Delegate Harry J. Parrish died, leaving the 50th House district seat vacant. Miller ran as the Republican nominee, replacing Parrish in a special election held together with the November congressional election. He lost his seat in 2017 to Lee J. Carter, a member of the Democratic Socialists of America. Many regard his loss as the biggest surprise of Virginia's 2017 election cycle due to his opponent's lack of party support.

Date	Election	Candidate	Party	Votes	%
Manassas, Virginia city council
May 4, 2004	General (3 seats)	Harry J. "Hal" Parrish II		2,772	30.95
May 4, 2004	General (3 seats)	Steven S. Smith		2,394	26.73
May 4, 2004	General (3 seats)	Jackson Hunter Miller		2,050	22.89
May 4, 2004	General (3 seats)	Clyde D. Wimmer		1,712	19.11
May 4, 2004	General (3 seats)	Write Ins		29	0.32
Virginia House of Delegates, 50th district
Nov 7, 2006	Special	J H Miller	Republican	7,900	52.80
Nov 7, 2006	Special	J M Rishell	Democratic	7,039	47.04
Nov 7, 2006	Special	Write Ins		24	0.16
Nov 7, 2006	Special	Harry J. Parrish died; seat stayed Republican			
Nov 6, 2007	General	Jackson Hunter Miller	Republican	6,170	60.38
Nov 6, 2007	General	Jeannette M. Rishell	Democratic	4,033	39.46
Nov 6, 2007	General	Write Ins		15	0.14
Nov 3, 2009	General	Jackson Hunter Miller	Republican	7,651	62.38
Nov 3, 2009	General	Jeannette M. Rishell	Democratic	4,605	37.54
Nov 3, 2009	General	Write Ins		9	0.07
Nov 8, 2011	General	Jackson Hunter Miller	Republican	8,033	94.86
Nov 8, 2011	General	Write Ins		433	5.13
Nov 5, 2013	General	Jackson Hunter Miller	Republican	9,498	54.9
Nov 5, 2013	General	Richard Anibal Cabellos	Democratic	7,769	44.9
Nov 5, 2013	General	Others		49	.3
Nov 3, 2015	General	Jackson Hunter Miller	Republican	7,820	58.7
Nov 3, 2015	General	Kyle Blaine McCullough	Democratic	5,484	41.2
Nov 3, 2015	General	Others		17	.1
Nov 7, 2017	General	Lee J. Carter	Democratic	11,364	54.33
Nov 7, 2017	General	Jackson Hunter Miller	Republican	9,512	45.47
Nov 7, 2017	General	Write In		41	.2
