= Luke Torian =

American politician

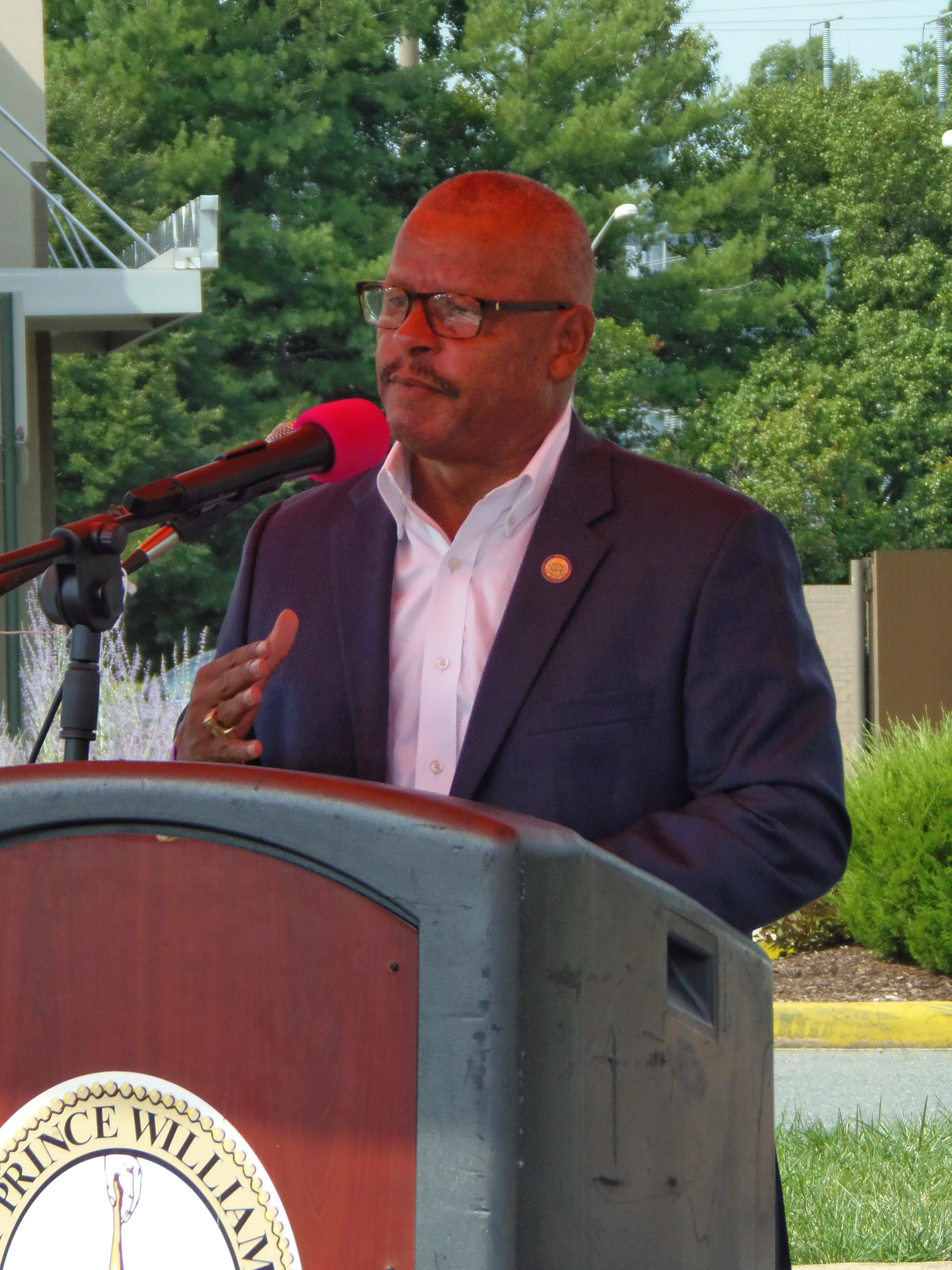

Member of the Virginia House of Delegates
- Incumbent
- Assumed office January 13, 2010
- Preceded by: Jeff Frederick
- Constituency: 52nd district (2010–2024); 24th district (2024–present)

Personal details
- Born: May 30, 1958 (age 68) Roxboro, North Carolina, U.S.
- Party: Democratic
- Spouse: Clarice Jones
- Education: Winston-Salem State University (BA); Southeastern Baptist Theological Seminary; Virginia Union University (M.Div.); Howard University (D.Min.)
- Website: Official website

Luke E. Torian (born May 30, 1958) is an American politician. Since 2010 he has served in the Virginia House of Delegates, representing the 24th district in the Prince William County suburbs of Washington, D.C. He is a member of the Democratic Party.

In 2019, Torian introduced and passed House bills on a variety of issues, from expediting the screening process for community-based and institutional long-term care services (HB 2474) to extending the benefits of the Virginia Military Survivors and Dependents Education Program to the spouse or child of a veteran with at least a 90 percent permanent, service-related disability (HB 2685).

As of 2026, Torian serves as chair of the Appropriations Committee and also chairs General Laws and Rules subcommittees. He has previously served on the Agriculture, Chesapeake and Natural Resources Committee and the Counties, Cities and Towns Committee.

== Early life and education ==
Torian was born in Roxboro, North Carolina. He received a B.A. degree in political science from Winston-Salem State University in 1980. Training to become a Baptist minister, he received a master's degree in divinity in 1984 from the School of Theology at Virginia Union University, and a doctorate in ministry from the Howard University School of Divinity in 1987.

Torian worked for the Fellowship of Christian Athletes for eight years. He was pastor of Gilfield Baptist Church in Charles City County, Virginia 1990–1995. Since then, he has been pastor of First Mount Zion Baptist Church in Dumfries.

== Community involvement ==
Torian has been a community leader in Prince William County for decades. He has played a major role in Action in Community Through Service (ACTS), an organization designed to alleviate hunger, homelessness, and domestic violence in the community. He is also one of the founders of Virginians Organized for Interfaith Community Engagement (VOICE), an organization dedicated to making change on social justice issues.

== Electoral history ==
In February 2009, Republican Party of Virginia chair Jeff Frederick announced that he would not run for reelection to the Virginia House of Delegates. Torian ran for Frederick's 52nd district seat, winning a Democratic primary with more than two-thirds of the votes cast, then defeating Republican nominee Rafael Lopez.

Date	Election	Candidate	Party	Votes	%
Virginia House of Delegates, 52nd district
June 9, 2009	Democratic primary	Luke E. Torian		1,812	68.14
June 9, 2009	Democratic primary	Michael A. Hodge		847	31.85
November 3, 2009	General	Luke E. Torian	Democratic	8,267	51.89
November 3, 2009	General	Rafael Lopez	Republican	7,616	47.81
November 3, 2009	General	Write Ins		46	0.28
November 3, 2009	General	Jeff Frederick retired; seat switched from Republican to Democratic			
November 8, 2011	General	Luke E. Torian	Democratic	5,156	60.58
November 8, 2011	General	S. Cleveland Anderson	Republican	3,327	39.09
November 8, 2011	General	Write Ins		27	0.31
November 5, 2013	General	Luke Torian	Democratic	10,890	100.00
November 5, 2013	General	Write Ins		-	-
November 3, 2015	General	Luke Torian	Democratic	7,688	100.00
November 3, 2015	General	Write Ins		-	-
November 7, 2017	General	Luke Torian	Democratic	14,830	100.00
November 7, 2017	General	Write Ins		-	-

(Note: Write Ins are not included for results after 2011.)

== Political Activity ==
Since first being elected to the Virginia House of Delegates in 2009, Torian has received campaign contributions from a wide range of regulated industries and special interest groups, including the gambling, alcohol, and tobacco industries. Campaign finance records show that Torian has received more than $1.65 million in contributions from Dominion Energy, Virginia’s energy monopoly, and more than $30,000 from Appalachian Power. As chairman of the House Appropriations Committee, Torian plays a significant role in shaping legislation and budgetary decisions affecting Virginia's regulated utilities.

Torian has also received substantial financial support from interests associated with Virginia's growing data center industry, including technology companies, industry lobbyists, and labor organizations connected to data center development. During a 2026 debate regarding Virginia's data center tax abatement program—an incentive estimated to reduce state tax revenues by approximately $1.9 billion—Torian stated, "The industry will work it out themselves. Their share is going to be the number that they come back with to us, that we feel comfortable agreeing with." Campaign finance records indicate that Torian has received more than $250,000 in contributions from entities connected to the data center industry.
