= Virginia House Bill 1414 =

Proposed law

Virginia House Bill 1414 was a proposed legislation introduced into the Virginia General Assembly on January 14, 2015, by Bob Marshall. The bill didn't pass. The bill would have enabled refusal of service to persons based on "same-sex "marriage" or homosexual behavior" by any public or private business in some way licensed by the state. Critics suggest that the law, if enacted, could be used by hospitals to turn away patients, restaurants to refuse to serve and to remove students from school and compared it to Jim Crow laws. The Virginia Christian Alliance emphasized their position that the bill is critical to clergy and that they "fear for their job" should the bill fail.

Similar bills have been introduced but not signed into law in other states. In 2014, Arizona, Governor Jan Brewer, a Republican, vetoed Arizona SB 1062 which would have given business owners the right to refuse service to homosexuals on religious grounds. Kansas House Bill 2453 was approved by that state's house of representatives but failed to make it out of the Kansas Senate Judiciary Committee:

A person seeking to obtain or renew a license, registration, or certificate from the Commonwealth, its political subdivisions, or any agency, authority, board, department, or other entity thereof, shall not be required to perform, assist, consent to, or participate in any action or refrain from performing, assisting, consenting to, or participating in any action as a condition of obtaining or renewing the license, registration, or certificate where such condition would violate the religious or moral convictions of such person with respect to same-sex "marriage" or homosexual behavior.

— Bob Marshall (R), Virginia House Bill 1414

== See also ==
- Kansas House Bill 2453
