= Bob Marshall (Virginia politician) =

American politician (born 1944)

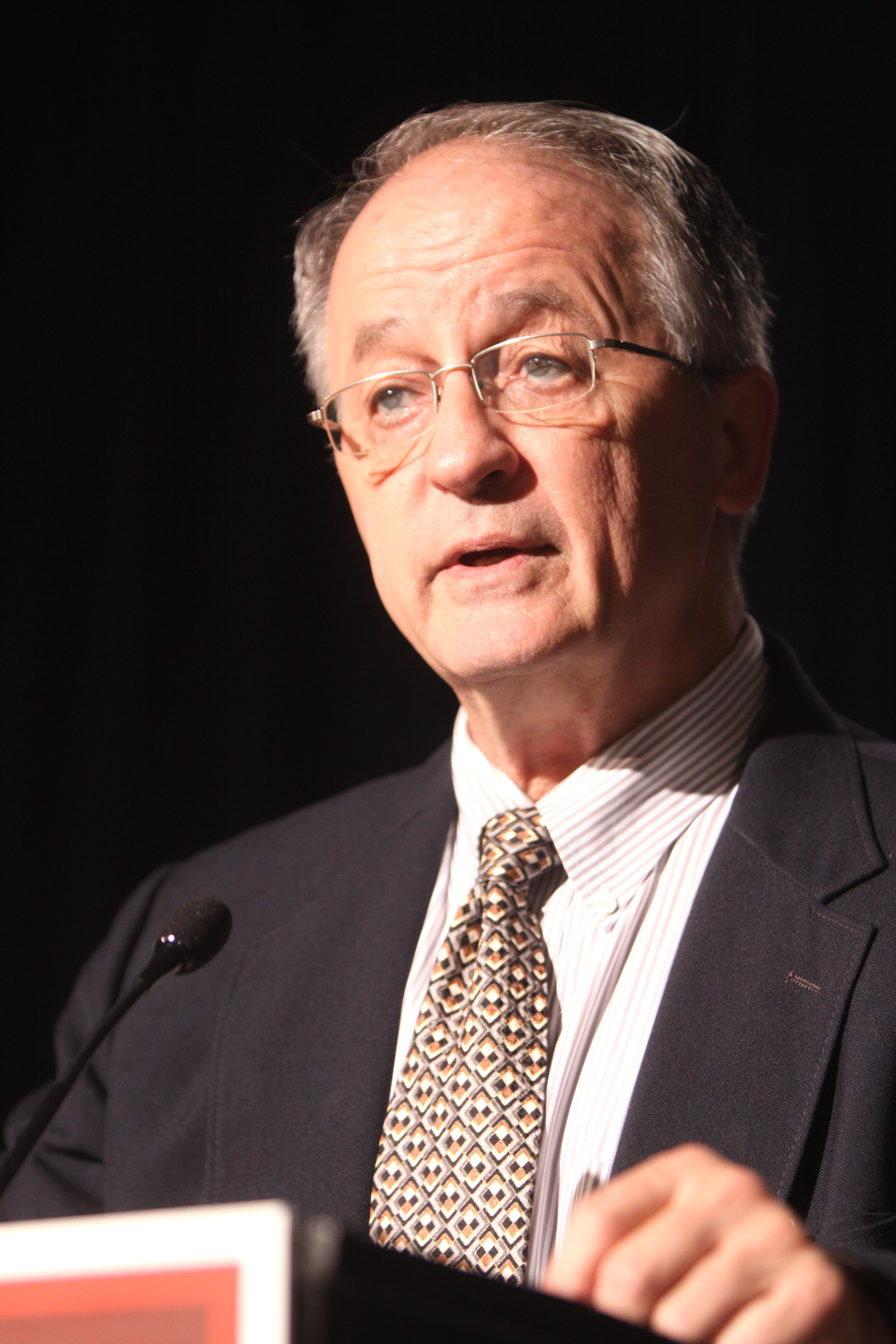
- Marshall in 2012

Member of the Virginia House of Delegates from the 13th district
- In office January 8, 1992 – January 10, 2018
- Preceded by: Joan H. Munford
- Succeeded by: Danica Roem

Personal details
- Born: Robert Gerald Marshall; May 3, 1944 (age 82) Takoma Park, Maryland, U.S.
- Party: Republican
- Spouse: Catherine Ann Fonseca
- Children: 5
- Education: Montgomery College (AA); Belmont Abbey College (BA); California State University, Northridge (MA)
- Website: www.delegatebob.com

Robert Gerald Marshall (born May 3, 1944) is an American businessman, author, and former politician who was a Republican member of the Virginia House of Delegates representing the 13th District. His district included portions of Prince William and Loudoun counties. Self-described as Virginia's "chief homophobe," he was known for sponsoring the Marshall-Newman Amendment prohibiting same-sex marriage and an unsuccessful bathroom bill proposal. In the November 7, 2017, general election, Marshall was defeated by nine percentage points by Democrat Danica Roem, the first openly transgender candidate elected to a state legislature in the United States.

In 2008, Marshall ran for the United States Senate seat being vacated by John Warner, but lost the Republican nomination at the convention to Jim Gilmore by 66 votes out of over 10,000 cast. In January 2012, Marshall announced his candidacy for the U.S. Senate seat being vacated by Jim Webb. He lost in the Republican June primary to George Allen, winning only 7 percent of the vote.

== Early life, education, and business career ==
Marshall received his education from Montgomery College, Belmont Abbey College, and California State University, Northridge. Before election to the Virginia House of Delegates in 1991, Marshall was a staffer for the American Life League, an organization which opposes all forms of abortion and birth control. After his election, he continued to work for the organization, including a stint as executive director in the mid-1990s and now as a research consultant. He belongs to the All Saints Catholic Church in Manassas, Virginia.

His sister is actress Paula Marshall.

== Virginia House of Delegates ==
=== Elections ===
In 1991, Marshall ran for the House of Delegates 13th District seat, which was held by Democrat Joan Munford but left open after the 1990 redistricting process which caused Munford to run in the 12th District. Marshall faced Democrat Dale Reynolds and won handily, 58%-42%. After winning the seat, Marshall was challenged and won in every election except 2003, when he ran unopposed, and 2017, which he lost to Danica Roem. He won with 66% of the vote in 1993, 80% in 1995, 85% in 1997, 61% in 1999, 63% in 2001, 55% in 2005, 58% in 2007, 61% in 2009, 60% in 2011, 51% in 2013, and 56% in 2015.

=== "No confidence" in House Republican leadership ===
In September 2007, Marshall introduced a resolution "of no confidence in the policies of the current House of Delegates Republican Leadership as pursued from 2002 to the present". Among Marshall's complaints were that the Republican leaders were "Allowing government spending to increase at new record levels of spending" and that they were making policy decisions "in a small closed group and in a secretive manner without benefit of wide Caucus input or knowledge". For the latter, he said that the leadership, in late 2006, "prepared a transportation bill which Caucus members were expected to accept without discussion or critical input". According to some state legislators, the only vote in favor of Marshall's resolution was that of Marshall himself.

=== Topics of action ===
==== Birth control ====
In 1989, when Marshall was working as the research director of the American Life League, he told The Boston Globe that he opposes all forms of abortion and birth control that take effect after conception. "We're against the IUD and pills, too. They don't prevent ovulation and conception, they prevent implantation, which is abortion."

According to the Globe, Marshall also "railed" against Norplant, a contraceptive not-yet-marketed at the time that is implanted under the skin and works for up to five years. "It's a real tribute to women's intelligence," Marshall told the reporter. "They feel so irresponsible they can't do something once a day?" Norplant was eventually removed from the U.S. market for "business reasons". Because of health concerns, the U.S. Food and Drug Administration (FDA) recommended that women consider other forms of birth control.

When asked about abortion in the case of incest, Marshall replied that sometimes incest is voluntary. In response to abortions in the case of rape, Marshall said, "Your origins should not be held against you [referring to the victim's unborn child]. The woman becomes a sin-bearer of the crime, because the right of a child predominates over the embarrassment of the woman."

The measure, barring public colleges from making the morning-after pill available, went on to pass 54–46 in the House but ultimately failed in the Senate.

During the 2012 legislative session, Marshall and other Republicans supported a measure (SB484/HB462) to require women in Virginia to undergo a trans-vaginal ultrasound procedure before being allowed to have a legal abortion. Public protests about this invasive procedure caused Virginia Governor Robert McDonnell to withdraw his support for the bill. It was then amended to require only an "external" transabdominal ultrasound procedure. Critics argued it was not medically required or indicated, while other physicians and ultrasound technicians argued a trans-vaginal ultrasound is essential both before and after for an abortion to be performed safely.

Marshall was the subject of controversy in February 2010, when he made a statement regarding complications of abortion on disabled children at a press conference to oppose state funding of Planned Parenthood:

The number of children who are born subsequent to a first abortion with handicaps has increased dramatically. Why? Because when you abort the first born of any, nature takes its vengeance on the subsequent children... In the Old Testament, the first born of every being, animal and man, was dedicated to the Lord. There's a special punishment Christians would suggest.

McDonnell also criticized Marshall, saying on Washington area radio station WTOP that his comments were "poor and offensive and wrong", and that "we should do everything we can for young children who are disabled and provide the best safety net we can".

Marshall initially claimed that his remarks had been misconstrued, but in a press conference on April 10, 2014, Marshall said he stood by his previous statements: "I don’t care. I mean, if I say something in public, I say it in public."

==== Immigration ====
In September 2007, State Senator John Watkins was overwhelmingly voted the chair of Virginia Commission on Immigration, 16–3. Marshall, however, refused to give up his interim chair and "panel members had to wrestle the gavel away from Marshall". Marshall then challenged Watkins to a debate.

==== Homosexuality ====
Marshall expressed displeasure at the Federal Reserve Bank of Richmond's decision to fly a gay pride flag alongside the American flag to celebrate LGBT Pride Month in 2011. Marshall wrote a letter to Jeffrey M. Lacker, president of the bank, urging him to take down the flag, claiming that homosexuality "adds significantly to illness, increases health costs, promotes venereal diseases, and worsens the population imbalance relating to the number of workers supporting the beneficiaries of America’s Social Security and Medicare programs." The bank refused to remove the flag.

In May 2012, Marshall led a successful effort to defeat the nomination of openly gay prosecutor Tracy Thorne-Begland to a district court judgeship, who was supported by both the governor and a bipartisan judicial committee. Marshall explained that he was worried about possible bias in the case of a bar-room fight between a homosexual and a heterosexual. In a subsequent interview with CNN, he declared that "sodomy is not a civil right." In January 2013, the House of Delegates held a new vote and confirmed the nomination of Thorne-Begland for judgeship. The vote again received bipartisan support. In response to the confirmation, Marshall said, "The members who switched are going to have a hard time explaining this to the Republican base...The conservatives are not going to be very pleased about this."

In May 2014, Marshall filed paperwork for the impeachment of Virginia's Democratic attorney general Mark Herring on the grounds that Herring had refused to defend the Commonwealth's ban on same-sex marriage in federal court. The impeachment demand swiftly was rejected by his fellow Republican, Virginia Speaker of the House William J. Howell. Marshall also called for the impeachment of judges who might overturn the ban.

In January 2015, Marshall introduced Virginia House Bill 1414 which would enable refusal of service to persons based on same-sex marriage or homosexual behavior by any public or private business in some way licensed by the state. Critics suggest that the law, if enacted, could be used by hospitals to turn away patients, restaurants to refuse to serve, and to remove students from school and compared it to Jim Crow laws. The Virginia Christian Alliance emphasized its position that the bill is critical to clergy and that they "fear for their job" if the bill should fail.

===== Marriage =====
In 2004, Marshall was the chief patron of the "Affirmation of Marriage Act" (HB751), which declared "the Commonwealth of Virginia is under no constitutional or legal obligation to recognize a marriage, civil union, partnership contract or other arrangement purporting to bestow any of the privileges or obligations of marriage under the laws of another state or territory of the United States unless such marriage conforms to the laws of this Commonwealth." The bill was introduced in January and was signed into law on April 26, 2004. HB751 extended and affirmed the existing HB1589/SB884, which had been enacted in 1997. The 1997 bills prohibited same-sex marriages and also prohibited the recognition of other states' such marriages; HB751 extended that prohibition to other legal arrangements not specifically named "marriage".

Marshall went on to sponsor the Marshall-Newman Amendment to the state constitution in 2005, which prohibited same-sex marriage as well as civil unions, domestic partnerships, and "other legal status to which is assigned the rights, benefits, obligations, qualities, or effects of marriage." It passed the General Assembly in 2005 (HJ 586, incorporating Marshall's HJ 584) and was approved in a 2006 voter referendum by 57% to 43%. With the ratification of the amendment, Section 15-A was added to Article I, stating "[t]hat only a union between one man and one woman may be a marriage valid in or recognized by this Commonwealth and its political subdivisions."

Speaking before an anti-abortion group in 2013, Marshall criticized the 2013 Supreme Court Justice Anthony Kennedy's majority opinion which ruled the Defense of Marriage Act unconstitutional. Marshall asserted that "For all I know, Kennedy’s a homosexual. You can’t be doing some of these things without this kind of conclusion." In 2014, Judge Arenda Wright Allen ruled in Bostic v. Schaefer the relevant laws passed in 1997, 2004, and 2006 prohibiting same-sex marriage in Virginia were unconstitutional. In 2015, the United States Supreme Court ruled the prohibition of same-sex marriage was unconstitutional in Obergefell v. Hodges and state legislation was subsequently introduced in 2015 and 2016 to repeal the prohibition of same-sex marriage (SB 10, HB 1395, SB 782).

===== Military service =====
Following Congress' repeal of the military's "Don't Ask, Don't Tell" policy in December 2010, Marshall proposed a bill to "ban gays from openly serving in the Virginia National Guard because he is worried about service members catching sexually transmitted diseases from gay troops." According to The Washington Post'', Marshall justified the legislation by saying: "If I needed a blood transfusion and the guy next to me had committed sodomy 14 times in the last month, I'd be worried," and "It's a distraction when I'm on the battlefield and have to concentrate on the enemy 600 yards away and I'm worried about this guy who's got eyes on me."

The Virginia chapter of the American Civil Liberties Union wrote a letter to Marshall stating that "any attempt to exclude service members from the National Guard would be unconstitutional and ill-advised, and would certainly face a federal court challenge," and urging him to withdraw the bill. Republican Governor Bob McDonnell also announced his opposition to the bill, saying that, while he disagreed with Congress' repeal of "Don't Ask, Don't Tell: "We can't have two different systems in the federal and National Guard...Whatever the final guidelines of the Department of Defense I would expect the National Guard bureau in Virginia to adhere to those rules so we would have one set of rules for the entire military." Reacting to the proposal, Ronald Bailey of Reason Magazine called Marshall "excreable" and "long[ed] for that glad day when the voters of the 13th district wise up and spare us the bigoted natterings of Marshall."

==== Taxes ====
In 2006 the General Assembly passed House Bill 3202 which authorized Northern Virginia and Hampton Roads to raise revenue through regional authorities, the Northern Virginia Transportation Authority and the Hampton Roads Transportation Authority respectively. Revenues raised by these authorities were intended to be used for regional transportation improvements.

Marshall was strongly critical of this legislation during floor debate. On the house floor in April 2007 he remarked, "I cannot vote for this bill because there are too many subterfuges in here trying to avoid responsibility and accountability. Members of these regional governments -- and they are regional governments -- don't even have to vote on this until December. What's interesting about December? It's a month and a half after the election. They can all promise 'I'm not going to vote to raise any taxes' and then afterward they can vote to do it."

After the bill passed over his objections, Marshall led an effort in conjunction with elected officials in Loudoun County, Virginia to have it overturned by the courts. Marshall's brief argued that the state Constitution did not authorize the establishment of unelected government bodies with the authority to impose and collect taxes. Article 7, Section 7 of the Constitution of Virginia states: "No ordinance or resolution... imposing taxes, or authorizing the borrowing of money shall be passed except by a recorded affirmative vote of a majority of all members elected to the governing body."

The Supreme Court of Virginia unanimously ruled this legislation unconstitutional on February 29, 2008, siding with Marshall.

the General Assembly has failed to adhere to the mandates of accountability and transparency that the Constitution requires when the General Assembly exercises the legislative taxing authority permitted by the Constitution.

The ruling surprised many proponents of HB3202. One newspaper describe the effect of the ruling as "hitting the General Assembly like a bomb", and the director of the Hampton Roads Regional Transportation Authority characterized the decision as "nuclear".

==== Bathroom bill ====
Marshall introduced the "Physical Privacy Act" (HB 1612), a bill to restrict bathroom and changing facility use by transgender people in January 2017. The bill would have restricted the use of restrooms and changing facilities to the individual's sex, which the bill defined as the biological assignation at birth. In addition, the bill would have required public school principals to inform guardians of minors if the minor asked "to be recognized or treated as the opposite sex" within twenty-four hours of the request. In response, Petula Dvorak, a columnist for The Washington Post, dubbed Marshall "[Virginia's] Minister of Private Parts", pointing to Marshall's history of proposed legislation regulating social, reproductive, and sexual issues.

==== Guns in schools ====
In the wake of the Sandy Hook Elementary School shooting, Marshall proposed legislation that would require teachers or school staff to carry concealed handguns in public schools.

=== Committee assignments ===
- House Finance Committee
- House Counties, Cities, and Towns Committee
- House Science and Technology Committee

== U.S. Senate elections ==
=== 2008 ===
On January 7, 2008, Marshall announced that he was running for John Warner's U.S. Senate seat. He was running against former Governor Jim Gilmore for the Republican nomination. Marshall ran well to Gilmore's right, claiming Gilmore is too soft on abortion. While Gilmore believes a woman should be able to choose whether to end her pregnancy in the first eight weeks, Marshall opposes abortion in all circumstances.

=== 2012 ===
After months of speculation, on January 12, 2012, Marshall confirmed that he would enter the race for the Republican nomination for the U.S. Senate seat held by the retiring Jim Webb. He formally announced his candidacy on January 16, 2012, emailing supporters saying, "I can beat Tim Kaine," the presumptive Democratic nominee for the seat. He lost in the June 12, 2012, Republican primary, coming in third out of four candidates with only 7 percent of the vote.

== House of Representatives ==
In February 2014, Marshall declared his candidacy for the District 10 seat in the U.S. House of Representatives being vacated by retiring representative Frank Wolf (R-VA), calling the other leading Republican challenger Barbara Comstock weak on gun rights. Comstock defeated Marshall and four other challengers in the April 2014 Republican primary with 54% of the vote. In the run-up to the election, Comstock spent $240,000, more than sixteen times the spending of Marshall, who came in second place with 28% of the vote.

== Personal life ==
Marshall is married to Catherine Ann Fonseca, with whom he has five children: Teresa, Christopher (deceased), Mary Clare, Joseph, and Thomas.
