= William A. Beeton Jr. =

American attorney and politician

Bill Beeton
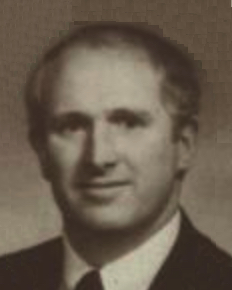

Member of the Virginia House of Delegates from the 13th district
- In office January 13, 1982 – January 12, 1983 Serving with Charles Hawkins & Ken Calvert
- Preceded by: Claude V. Swanson
- Succeeded by: Joan H. Munford

Personal details
- Born: William Arthur Beeton, Jr. August 15, 1943 Lexington, Virginia, U.S.
- Died: November 2, 2002 (aged 59) Rio de Janeiro, Brazil
- Party: Republican
- Spouse: Anne Hutt
- Education: Lynchburg College (BA); University of Richmond (JD)

Military service
- Allegiance: United States
- Branch/service: United States Air Force
- Years of service: 1966–1970
- Battles/wars: Vietnam War

William Arthur Beeton, Jr. (August 15, 1943 – November 2, 2002) was an American attorney and Republican politician. In 1981, he was elected alongside Charles R. Hawkins and Kenneth E. Calvert to the Virginia House of Delegates, but a three-judge panel of the United States District Court for the Eastern District of Virginia found the state's multi-member districts to violated the Equal Protection Clause and ordered that new elections take place the following year. Beeton was defeated in the 1982 22nd district Republican primary by Joseph P. Crouch. He moved to northern Virginia, practiced law, and served as chairman of the board of directors of Wakefield Country Day School. In 2002, he died while on a business trip in Rio de Janeiro.
