= Frank P. Moncure =

American politician

Member of the Virginia House of Delegates for Stafford and Prince William
- In office January 12, 1944 – January 13, 1960
- Preceded by: Edgar R. Conner
- Succeeded by: Stanley A. Owens
- In office January 8, 1936 – January 9, 1940
- Preceded by: George W. Herring
- Succeeded by: Edgar R. Conner

Commonwealth's Attorney for Stafford County
- In office January 1, 1920 – December 31, 1927
- Preceded by: G. B. Wallace
- Succeeded by: Lawrence R. R. Curtis

Personal details
- Born: November 5, 1889 Fairfax, Virginia, U.S.
- Died: January 13, 1969 (aged 79) Stafford, Virginia, U.S.
- Party: Democratic
- Spouse: Frances E. DeLashmutt
- Children: William, Grace, Thomas
- Education: College of William and Mary; Georgetown University

Frank Peyton Moncure (November 5, 1889 – January 13, 1969), was a Virginia lawyer and politician who represented Prince William and Stafford Counties in the Virginia General Assembly for more than two decades (except during World War II).

== Early and family life ==
Born in Fairfax, Virginia to physician and Confederate veteran Walker Peyton Moncure (1842–1916) and his wife Mary Joanna Hughes Moncure (1852–1939) (both from long prominent northern Virginia families), Frank Moncure had several brothers and sisters. He attended the College of William and Mary and then Georgetown University.

He married Frances E. DeLashmutt (1893–1966), and their surviving children included: William Brinckloe Moncure (1914–1978), Grace DeLashmutt Moncure Carson (1916–1981), and Thomas McCarty Moncure (1920–2009).

== Career ==
Upon admission to the Virginia bar in 1912, Moncure opened a private law office. By 1915, he was assisting the elected Clerk of Stafford County, George W. Herring. In 1919, when Herring became a County Supervisor and was succeeded as clerk by James Ashby (1894–1950), Moncure was elected the Commonwealth's Attorney (prosecutor) for Stafford County, and won re-election in 1923. In 1927, Lawrence Robert Rose Curtis (1890–1954) defeated him (960 votes to 903), although his cousin R.C.L. Moncure Jr. was elected the County's Commissioner of Revenue (and re-elected several times, the last in 1939). Moncure was active as a Mason, and also began a school athletics program, by 1939 acquiring land and assisting the Stafford Boy Scouts who built ball fields and cabins on what was called the Stafford Athletic Club.

In 1935, Moncure won election to the Virginia General Assembly (a part-time position) to succeed Herring as the delegate for Stafford and Prince William Counties (as the district was then called). He was re-elected in 1937, but chose not to seek reelection in 1939. Thus during the World War II years, Edgar R. Conner of Prince William County held that office. Moncure ran again in 1944 and was elected delegate for both counties (the district's name changing to "Prince William and Stafford Counties"). He won re-election unopposed numerous times, but announced his retirement after the end of the 1959 session on April 4, 1959, during the state's Massive Resistance crisis as explained below.

A conservative Democrat, Moncure was long a member of the Byrd Organization. After U.S. Senator Harry F. Byrd announced a policy of "Massive Resistance" to the U.S. Supreme Court's decision requiring racial integration in Brown v. Board of Education, Moncure introduced a resolution (with 36 co-signatories) in the Virginia House of Delegates replacing the elected school board in Arlington County with one appointed by a board selected by a county judge (as in other counties before Arlington had won the ability to elect its school board), because the elected board wanted to cooperate after the NAACP filed suit to integrate Arlington's schools. A compromise replaced the elected school board with one appointed by the elected county board. This measure delayed school integration in Arlington, which finally occurred (peacefully as in Norfolk) in February 1959, after both a three-judge federal panel and the Virginia Supreme Court declared the Stanley Plan of measures supporting continued racial segregation of Virginia's schools (which Moncure staunchly supported), unconstitutional on January 19, 1959.

After his political retirement, Moncure practiced law with his son Thomas, who also served as Stafford County's Commissioner of Accounts for 37 years. Frank Moncure (like several other Dixiecrats) had supported Dwight Eisenhower for President in 1952 and T. Coleman Andrews and the State's Rights ticket in 1956.

In the November 1959 election, Stanley A. Owens of Prince William County was elected to succeed him as delegate for both counties. After the 1960 census redistricting, Owens continued to represent Prince William County, but Stafford was merged with Spotsylvania County and Fredericksburg, and after the U.S. Supreme Court in Davis v. Mann invalidated that initial reapportionment for unduly disfavoring northern Virginia, Loudoun and Prince William Counties jointly received another delegate who served with Owens for more than a decade, while Fredericksburg and Spotsylvania counties were merged electorally southward, sometimes even with Caroline and Hanover Counties.

== Death and legacy ==
Moncure died in 1969, three years after his wife Frances (1893–1966). Aquia Church, on whose vestry he and many family members had served, held the funeral an interred Frank beside Francis. The new Masonic Lodge in Stafford County was named after Frank Moncure in 1974.

From 1982 until 1987, his grandson Thomas McCarty Moncure Jr., who had become a lawyer like his father and grandfather, was elected to the Virginia General Assembly as the delegate representing Stafford County and parts of Fredericksburg. Unlike his grandfather, Tom Moncure was a lifelong conservative Republican rather than Democrat. Furthermore, beginning in 2002, Tom Moncure and other family members and parishioners of Aquia Episcopal church held a reunion with black Moncure family members (Edwin Conway Moncure having moved to Mississippi in 1815).

Virginia House of Delegates
| Preceded by George W. Herring | Virginia Delegate for Stafford and Prince William Counties; 1936-1940; 1944–1960 | Succeeded by Edgar R. Conner |
| Preceded by Edgar R. Conner | Virginia Delegate for Stafford and Prince William Counties; 1936-1940; 1944–1960 | Succeeded by Stanley A. Owens |
