= Virginia's 20th House of Delegates district =

Virginia legislative district

Virginia's 20th State House of Delegates district
- District map from the 2023 election
Delegate
Sonia Vásquez Luna; D–Manassas
- Demographics: 30% White; 11% Black; 47% Hispanic; 7% Asian; 0% Native American; 0% Hawaiian/Pacific Islander; 0% Other; 4% Multiracial
- Population (2024) • Voting age: 86,445; 18
- Registered voters: 47,221

Virginia's 20th House of Delegates district elects one of 100 seats in the Virginia House of Delegates, the lower house of the state's bicameral legislature. District 20 consists of parts of Prince William County and the cities of Manassas and Manassas Park. It is represented by Sonia Vásquez Luna, who took office after winning a special election following the resignation of Michelle Maldonado in 2026.

== District officeholders ==
Years	Delegate	Party	Electoral history
January 12, 1983 – January 13, 1988	Kenneth E. Calvert	Republican	Defeated for reelection
January 13, 1988 – January 9, 2002	Whittington W. Clement	Democratic	Declined to seek reelection; Appointed Virginia Secretary of Transportation
January 9, 2002 – January 13, 2010	Chris Saxman	Republican	Retired
January 13, 2010 – January 8, 2020	Richard Bell	Republican	First elected in 2009
January 8, 2020 – January 10, 2024	John Avoli	Republican	First elected in 2019. Redistricted to the 36th District did not run for re-election
January 8, 2020 – May 31, 2026	Michelle Maldonado	Democratic	Redistricted from the 50th District

== Results ==
Virginia's 20th House of Delegates district election, 2015
Party	Candidate	Votes	%	±%
Republican	Richard Bell (inc.)	10,758	75.14%	
Libertarian	Will Hammer	3,425	23.92%	
Write-ins		133	.92%	
Turnout		14,316		
Republican hold		Swing		
