= Saxman, West Virginia =

- Unincorporated community
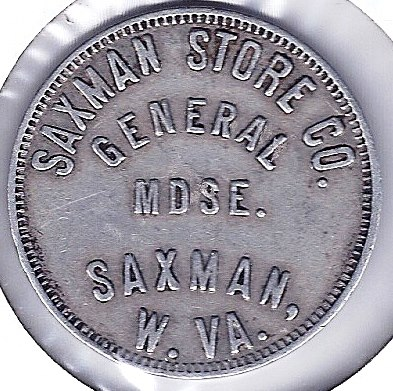
- Coal scrip from Saxman, West Virginia

- Location within West Virginia Location within the United States
- Coordinates: 38°12′35″N 80°35′49″W
- Country: United States
- State: West Virginia
- County: Nicholas
- Elevation: 2,247 ft (685 m)
- Time zone: UTC-5 (Eastern (EST))
  - Summer (DST): UTC-4 (EDT)
- Area codes: 304 & 681
- GNIS feature ID: 1555577

Saxman was an unincorporated community in Nicholas County, West Virginia, United States. Saxman is 3.5 miles (5.6 km) west-southwest of Richwood. It is now a ghost town, and the Saxman post office is also gone.
