= John A. Rollison III =

American politician

Jack Rollison

Member of the Virginia House of Delegates from the 52nd district
- In office January 8, 1986 – January 14, 2004
- Preceded by: Floyd C. Bagley
- Succeeded by: Jeff Frederick

Personal details
- Born: August 3, 1950 (age 76) Fort Myers, Florida, U.S.
- Party: Republican
- Spouse: Lawrie Falck
- Children: John A. Rollison IV, Amanda Rollison
- Education: Virginia Tech

John Adams Rollison III (born August 3, 1950, nicknamed "Jack") is an American businessman and Republican politician who served several terms in the Virginia General Assembly representing Prince William County, Virginia in the 52nd House District.

== Early and Family Life ==
Born in Fort Myers, Florida, Rollison graduated from Virginia Tech with a B.A. in political science. He enlisted in the U.S. Army and served from 1972 until 1981. He married Lawrie Falck, and they had a son (John A. Rollison IV) and a daughter (Amanda).

== Career ==
Upon leaving the Army, Rollison established Rollison's Tire and Auto Service in Virginia. He became active in the Rotary Club, Freemasons, and served as director of the local Prince William County Chamber of Commerce.

Active in the local Republican party, Rollison in 1985 defeated ten-term Democrat Floyd C. Bagley, whom the Washington Post had criticized as ineffective, and won re-election several times, surviving a December 1987 Washington Post article joking about his proposal for tree conservation legislation. Rollison rose to chair the House Transportation Committee. Fellow Republican Jeff Frederick won the November 2003 general election to represent District 52, and thus replaced Rollison.

Virginia House of Delegates
Preceded by Floyd C. Bagley	Virginia Delegate for Prince William County; 1986-2004	Succeeded by Jeff Frederick
