= Kenneth L. Calvert =

American computer scientist

Kenneth Leonard Calvert is an American computer scientist and a professor of computer science at the University of Kentucky, where from 2014 to 2020 he held the Gartner Group Chair in Network Engineering. His research interests include network topology and network security.

Calvert was named a Fellow of the Institute of Electrical and Electronics Engineers (IEEE) in 2012 "for contributions to internet topology and active networks".
