= Virginia's 52nd House of Delegates district =

Virginia legislative district

District map from the 2023 election

Virginia's 52nd House of Delegates district is one of 100 seats in the Virginia House of Delegates, the lower house of the state's bicameral legislature. It represents part of Prince William County. The seat is currently held by Democrat Luke E. Torian.

== Elections ==
Torian was first elected in 2009, taking office in 2010. In the 2009 election, he defeated Republican Rafael Lopez in a contest to replace Republican Jeffrey M. Frederick, a three-term Delegate who did not seek reelection after losing the Virginia Republican Party chairmanship in April 2009.
