= Chris Saxman =

American politician

Christopher B. Saxman

Member of the Virginia House of Delegates from the 20th district
- In office January 9, 2002 – January 13, 2010
- Preceded by: Whitt Clement
- Succeeded by: Dickie Bell

Personal details
- Born: October 18, 1965 (age 60) Pittsburgh, Pennsylvania
- Party: Republican
- Spouse: Michele Lynn Frick
- Children: Mary Kathryn, William, Nora, John
- Education: Washington and Lee University
- Occupation: Water company manager

Christopher B. Saxman (born October 18, 1965) is an American politician of the Republican Party. He is a former member of the Virginia House of Delegates, representing the 20th District from 2002 to his retirement in 2010. The district included the City of Staunton, the western part of Augusta County, the southern part of Rockingham County, and all of Highland County.

== Early life and education ==
After graduating from Robert E. Lee High School, he went on to earn a B.A. in History from Washington and Lee University in 1987. He worked in New York City, Philadelphia, and Washington, D.C. before returning to Staunton to teach U.S. History and Government for three years at Stuart Hall. He then became general manager of the family business, Shenandoah Valley Water Company, a bottled water and coffee distribution and delivery company.

== Political career ==
=== State politics ===
In November 2001, he was elected to the Virginia House of Delegates. (In the 2001 redistricting, the 20th District was moved to the Staunton area from Danville, where the seat had been held for seven terms by Democrat Whitt Clement.) Since the Spring of 2003, Delegate Saxman has served as Chairman of the House Cost Cutting Caucus, a bipartisan group that works to find cost savings in government.

The Hotline listed Delegate Saxman as one of the top 20 "up-and-coming stars of Virginia politics", in November 2003. In their 2006 edition, The Hotline noted that "many consider him an up-and-coming star in the party."

In addition to his work in the General Assembly, Delegate Saxman serves on the State Water Commission, the Virginia Schools for the Deaf and Blind Advisory Commission, the Board of Trustees for the Frontier Culture Museum, the board of the Blue Ridge Area Food Bank, and as a Chairman of the Board of the International Bottled Water Association. Saxman is also a member of the St. Francis of Assisi Church and the Shenandoah Valley Kiwanis.

Saxman and United States Senator John Warner were Virginia state co-chairs for John McCain's 2008 presidential campaign.

=== Potential 2008 Senate candidacy ===
On November 19, 2007, Saxman announced that he was considering a bid to run for the U.S. Senate to fill the seat of retiring Republican John Warner, after former Governor Jim Gilmore (R) announced that he was running for the position. Former Governor Mark Warner (D) - no relation to John Warner - also announced his candidacy.

On December 1, 2007, the Associated Press reported Chris Saxman would not seek the Republican Convention nomination to replace John Warner, and would be a candidate for reelection to his 20th District House seat in 2009.

=== House of Delegates retirement ===
Delegate Saxman surprised the political community when he announced on July 17, 2009, that he was withdrawing from his reelection bid, only days after campaigning door-to-door. He cited his desire to fight for what he calls "projects of my passion." GOP leaders nominated Staunton City Councilor Dickie Bell as the Republican nominee. In the November general election, Bell defeated the Democratic nominee, Erik Curren, marketing director of the American Shakespeare Center in Staunton.

== Personal life ==
Delegate Saxman currently resides in Staunton with his wife, Michele, an employee in the family business, and their four children, Mary Kathryn, William, Nora and John.

Saxman's father, Bill, and mother, Jan, are the founders of Shenandoah Valley Water Company.
