= Virginia's 13th House of Delegates district =

Virginia legislative district

Virginia's 13th State House of Delegates district
- District map from the 2023 election
Delegate
Marcus Simon; D–Falls Church
since January 10, 2024
- Demographics: 48% White; 6% Black; 23% Hispanic; 18% Asian; 1% Other; 4% Multiracial
- Population (2023) • Voting age: 85,213; 18
- Registered voters (2024): 54,296

Virginia's 13th House of Delegates district elects one of the hundred delegates of the Virginia House of Delegates, the lower house of the state's bicameral legislature. The 13th district consists of Falls Church as well as a portion of Fairfax County. Its seat is currently held by Marcus Simon.

== 2017 election ==
In the 2017 off-cycle general election, Bob Marshall ran for re-election to hold his seat which he had held since 1992. His Democratic opponent was Danica Roem, who has lived in Manassas her entire life. Roem campaigned on infrastructure issues, economic development, a minimum wage increase, school funding reform and civil rights issues. Commenting on Marshall's proposed bill to regulate use of restrooms in schools, at highway rest stops, and in other government buildings, Roem said that Marshall's "legislative priorities are more concerned with where I go to the bathroom than how his constituents get to work."

On November 7, 2017 during the general election, Roem defeated Republican incumbent Bob Marshall by a wide margin, making Roem the first openly transgender person to be elected to the Virginia Assembly and the highest-elected transgender person in the United States to date.

== District officeholders ==
Years	Delegate	Party	Electoral history
January 11, 1978 – January 13, 1982	Mary Sue Terry	Democratic	Declined to seek reelection
January 13, 1982 – 1983	Charles R. Hawkins	Republican	Declined to seek reelection
1983 – January 8, 1992	Joan H. Munford	Democratic	Declined to seek reelection
January 8, 1992 – January 10, 2018	Bob Marshall	Republican	Defeated in bid for reelection
January 10, 2018 – January 10, 2024	Danica Roem	Democratic	First elected in 2017 (redistricted to the 20th District successfully ran for Senate District 30)
January 10, 2024 – present	Marcus Simon	Democratic	Redistricted from the 53rd District

== Electoral history ==
As of the 2010 census, a total of 80,579 civilians reside within Virginia's thirteenth state house district.

=== Primary results ===
Virginia House of Delegates, District 13, Democratic Primary, June 14, 2017
Party	Candidate	Votes	%
Democratic	Danica Roem	1,863	43
Democratic	Steven Jansen	1,364	31
Democratic	Mansimran Kahlon	820	19
Democratic	Andrew Adams	290	7

=== General election results ===
Date	Election	Candidate	Party	Votes	%
Virginia House of Delegates, 13th district
Nov 6, 2001	General	R. G. Marshall	Republican	11,551	62.7
Nov 6, 2001	General	L. R. Brooks, Jr	Democratic	6,863	37.3
Nov 6, 2001	General	Write Ins		8	0
Nov 4, 2003	General	R. G. Marshall	Republican	12,629	98.8
Nov 4, 2003	General	Write Ins		156	1.2
Nov 8, 2005	General	R. G. Marshall	Republican	15,754	55.5
Nov 8, 2005	General	B. E. Roemmelt	Democratic	12,633	44.5
Nov 8, 2005	General	Write Ins		17	0.1
Nov 6, 2007	General	Robert Bob G. Marshall	Republican	14,826	58.3
Nov 6, 2007	General	Bruce E. Roemmelt	Democratic	10,579	41.6
Nov 6, 2007	General	Write Ins		31	0.1
Nov 3, 2009	General	Robert Bob G. Marshall	Republican	22,982	61.3
Nov 3, 2009	General	John J. Bell	Democratic	14,472	38.6
Nov 3, 2009	General	Write Ins		33	0.1
Nov 8, 2011	General	Robert Gerard Marshall	Republican	6,008	59.6
Nov 8, 2011	General	Carl Steven Genthner	Democratic	4,054	40.2
Nov 8, 2011	General	Write Ins		11	0.1
Nov 5, 2013	General	Robert Gerard Marshall	Republican	8,946	51.3
Nov 5, 2013	General	Atif Mustafa Qarni	Democratic	8,448	48.5
Nov 5, 2013	General	Write Ins		35	0.2
Nov 3, 2015	General	Robert Gerard Marshall	Republican	7,147	56.0
Nov 3, 2015	General	Donald Bruce Shaw, II	Democratic	5,592	43.9
Nov 3, 2015	General	Write Ins		13	0.1
Nov 7, 2017	General	Danica Anthony Roem	Democratic	12,077	53.7
Nov 7, 2017	General	Robert Gerard Marshall	Republican	10,318	45.9
Nov 7, 2017	General	Write Ins		90	0.4
Nov 5, 2019	General	Danica Anthony Roem	Democratic	12,066	55.9
Nov 5, 2019	General	Kelly Sweeney McGinn	Republican	9,468	43.9
Nov 5, 2019	General	Write Ins		46	0.2
Nov 2, 2021	General	Danica Anthony Roem	Democratic	15,604	54.2
Nov 2, 2021	General	Christopher Michael Stone	Republican	13,125	45.6
Nov 2, 2021	General	Write Ins		53	0.2
Nov 7, 2023	General	Marcus B. Simon	Democratic	16,778	78.5
Nov 7, 2023	General	Dave A. Crance, Jr.	Republican	4,323	20.2
Nov 7, 2023	General	Write Ins		265	1.2

== See also ==
- Virginia's 13th House of Delegates district election, 2017
