= Michelle Maldonado =

American politician

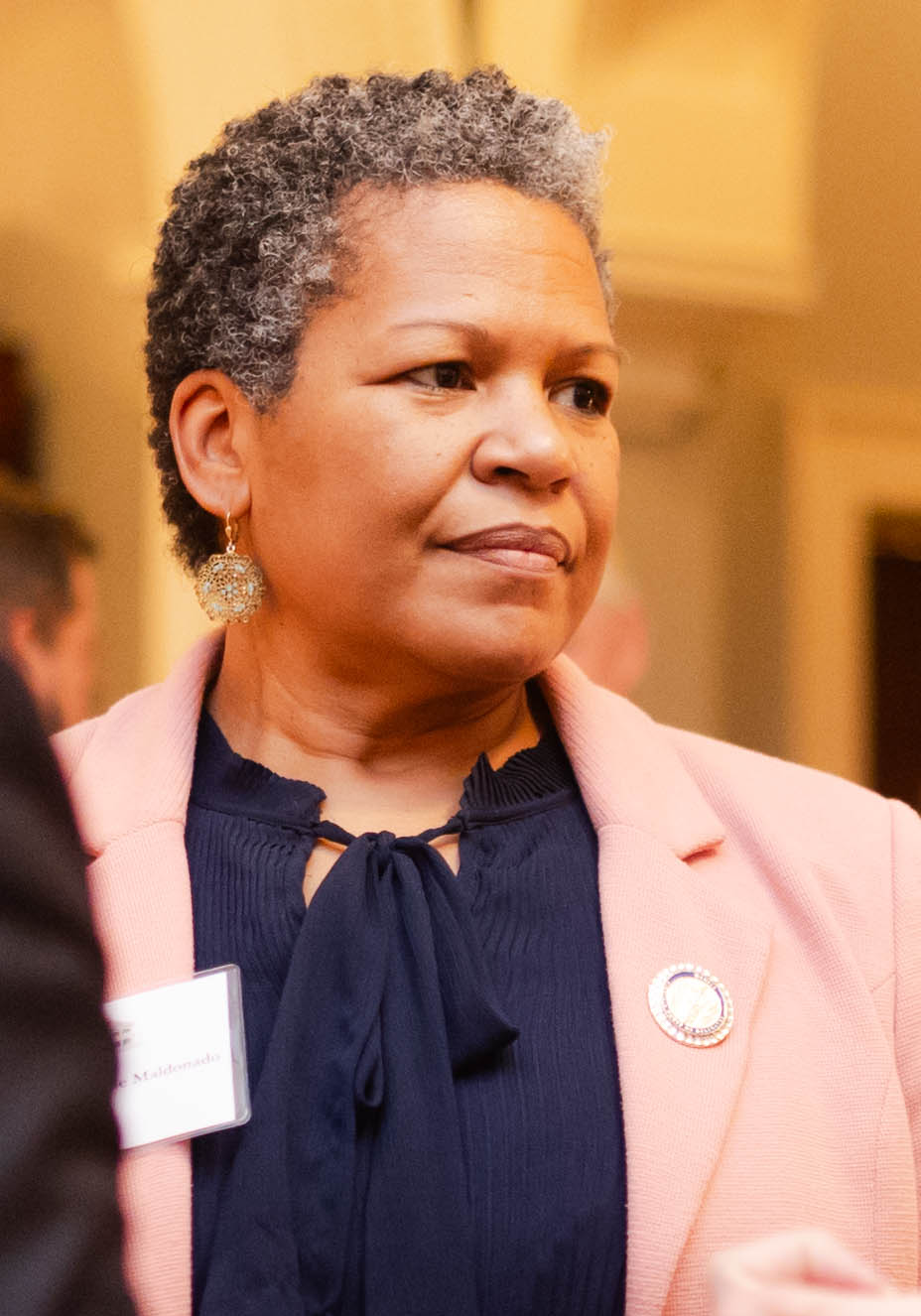
- Maldonado in 2024

Member of the Virginia House of Delegates
- In office January 12, 2022 – May 31, 2026
- Preceded by: Lee J. Carter
- Succeeded by: Sonia Vásquez Luna
- Constituency: 50th district (2022–2024); 20th district (2024–2026)

Personal details
- Born: Falmouth, Massachusetts, U.S.
- Party: Democratic
- Spouse: Roberto Maldonado Jr.
- Children: 1
- Education: Barnard College (BA); George Washington University (JD)

Michelle-Ann E. Lopes Maldonado (/ˈmiːʃɛl/ MEE-shel) is an American politician who served in the Virginia House of Delegates as a member of the Democratic Party. She represented the 50th district from 2022 to 2024 and the 20th district from 2024 to 2026.

== Early life and education ==
Michelle Maldonado was born in Falmouth, Massachusetts. Her grandmother was the first Black person to work as a principal in Cape Cod, Massachusetts. She is of Cape Verdean-descent. She graduated with an undergraduate degree from Barnard College of Columbia University in Latin American studies and Spanish literature and language.

Maldonado moved to Virginia in 1993, to attend George Washington University Law School. She married Roberto Maldonado Jr., with whom she had one son. She was admitted to the bar in Washington, D.C. and Virginia.

== Virginia House of Delegates ==
Maldonado filed to run for a seat in the Virginia House of Delegates from the 50th district during the 2021 election. She stated that she was inspired to run for office following the murders of Ahmaud Arbery and George Floyd, the killing of Breonna Taylor, and the attack on the United States Capitol.

Maldonado defeated incumbent Delegate Lee J. Carter, who was also running for the Democratic nomination for governor, and activist Helen Zurita in the Democratic primary. During the primary campaign Carter had raised around $84,000, Maldonado raised around $56,000, and Zurita raised around $6,000. She defeated Republican nominee Steve Pleickhardt in the general election. Maldonado resigned from the House on May 31, 2026, stating that she was caring for a parent with a terminal illness.

== Post-House career ==
In June 2026, Maldonado became an associate director of AI policy at the Information Technology and Innovation Foundation.

== Political positions ==
Maldonado supports increasing the minimum wage to $15 per hour stating that "no person should be working 40 hours a week and still be at, below or close to the poverty line". She declined an endorsement from the NARAL Pro-Choice America during the 2021 election due to their support for the defunding of police.

== Electoral history ==
2021 Virginia House of Delegates 50th district election
Primary election
Party	Candidate	Votes	%
Democratic	Michelle Maldonado	1,558	44.14%
Democratic	Lee J. Carter (incumbent)	1,355	38.39%
Democratic	Helen Zurita	617	17.48%
Total votes		3,530	100.00%
General election
Democratic	Michelle Maldonado	14,426	54.71%
Republican	Steve Pleickhardt	11,893	45.10%
Write-in		51	0.19%
Total votes		26,370	100.00%

2023 Virginia House of Delegates 20th district election
Party	Candidate	Votes	%
Democratic	Michelle Maldonado	9,740	56.60%
Republican	Sharon Ashurst	7,422	43.13%
Write-in		45	0.26%
Total votes		17,207	100.00%

United States House of Representatives Democratic primary election: 10th District, 2024
Party	Candidate	Votes	%
Democratic	Suhas Subramanyam	13,504	30.4%
Democratic	Dan Helmer	11,784	26.6%
Democratic	Atif Qarni	4,768	10.7%
Democratic	Eileen Filler-Corn	4,131	9.3%
Democratic	Jennifer Boysko	4,016	9.0%
Democratic	David Reid	1,419	3.2%
Democratic	Michelle Maldonado	1,412	3.2%
Democratic	Adrian Pokharel	1,028	2.3%
Democratic	Krystle Kaul	982	2.2%
Democratic	Travis Nembhard	722	1.6%
Democratic	Marion Devoe	386	0.9%
Democratic	Mark Leighton	225	0.5%
Total votes		44,377	100.0%
