= Earl E. Bell =

American politician (1920–1984)

Member of the Virginia House of Delegates
- In office 1976–1981
- Preceded by: Andy Guest

Personal details
- Born: May 10, 1920 Capron, Virginia, US
- Died: October 6, 1984 (aged 64) Loudoun Memorial Hospital, Leesburg, Virginia, US
- Party: Democratic
- Education: Elon College
- Occupation: Politician, automotive dealer
- Military career
- Service: United States Army Air Force
- War: World War II

Earl E. Bell (May 10, 1920 – October 6, 1984) was an American politician who served as a Democrat in the Virginia House of Delegates.

== Biography ==
Bell was born in Capron, Virginia on May 10, 1920, and was raised a Methodist in Portsmouth. He attended Elon College. During World War II, he served in the United States Army Air Forces. After the war, he worked as an automotive dealer.

In 1976, Bell ran for the Virginia House of Delegates under the Virginia's 17th congressional district under Loudoun County. During a debate, Republican candidate Eileen Stout called him a "used car salesman from Loudoun County". Bell was elected to office, and continued to serve until 1981. He had a wife named Terry, and they had 4 sons together.

Bell died in the Loudoun Memorial Hospital in Leesburg on October 6, 1984, of congestive heart failure at the age of 64.
