= Harry J. Parrish =

American politician (1922–2006)

Member of the Virginia House of Delegates from the 50th district
- In office January 12, 1983 – March 28, 2006
- Preceded by: Dorothy McDiarmid; Ken Plum; Jack Rust
- Succeeded by: Jackson Miller

Member of the Virginia House of Delegates from the 23rd district
- In office January 13, 1982 – January 12, 1983 Serving with Floyd Bagley & David Brickley
- Preceded by: Elise B. Heinz
- Succeeded by: Royston Jester III

Personal details
- Born: Harry Jacob Parrish; February 19, 1922 Fairfax, Virginia, U.S.
- Died: March 28, 2006 (aged 84) Manassas, Virginia, U.S.
- Party: Republican
- Spouse: Mattie Cannon
- Education: Virginia Tech (B.B.A.)

Military service
- Allegiance: United States
- Branch/service: United States Army; United States Air Force
- Years of service: 1944–1971
- Rank: Colonel
- Unit: U.S. Army Air Corps; U.S. Air Force Reserve
- Battles/wars: World War II; Korean War; Vietnam War

Harry Jacob Parrish (February 19, 1922 – March 28, 2006) was a longtime member of the Virginia House of Delegates at the time of his death. Born February 19, 1922, Parrish served as a colonel in the United States Air Force from 1942 and 1946 before being elected to the town council of Manassas, Virginia in 1951. He held that position until 1963, when he was elected mayor; he served in that capacity until 1981. Parrish became a delegate in 1982. He was also chairman of the board of the Manassas Ice and Fuel Company, Inc.
