= 2021 Virginia lieutenant gubernatorial election =

- November 2, 2021
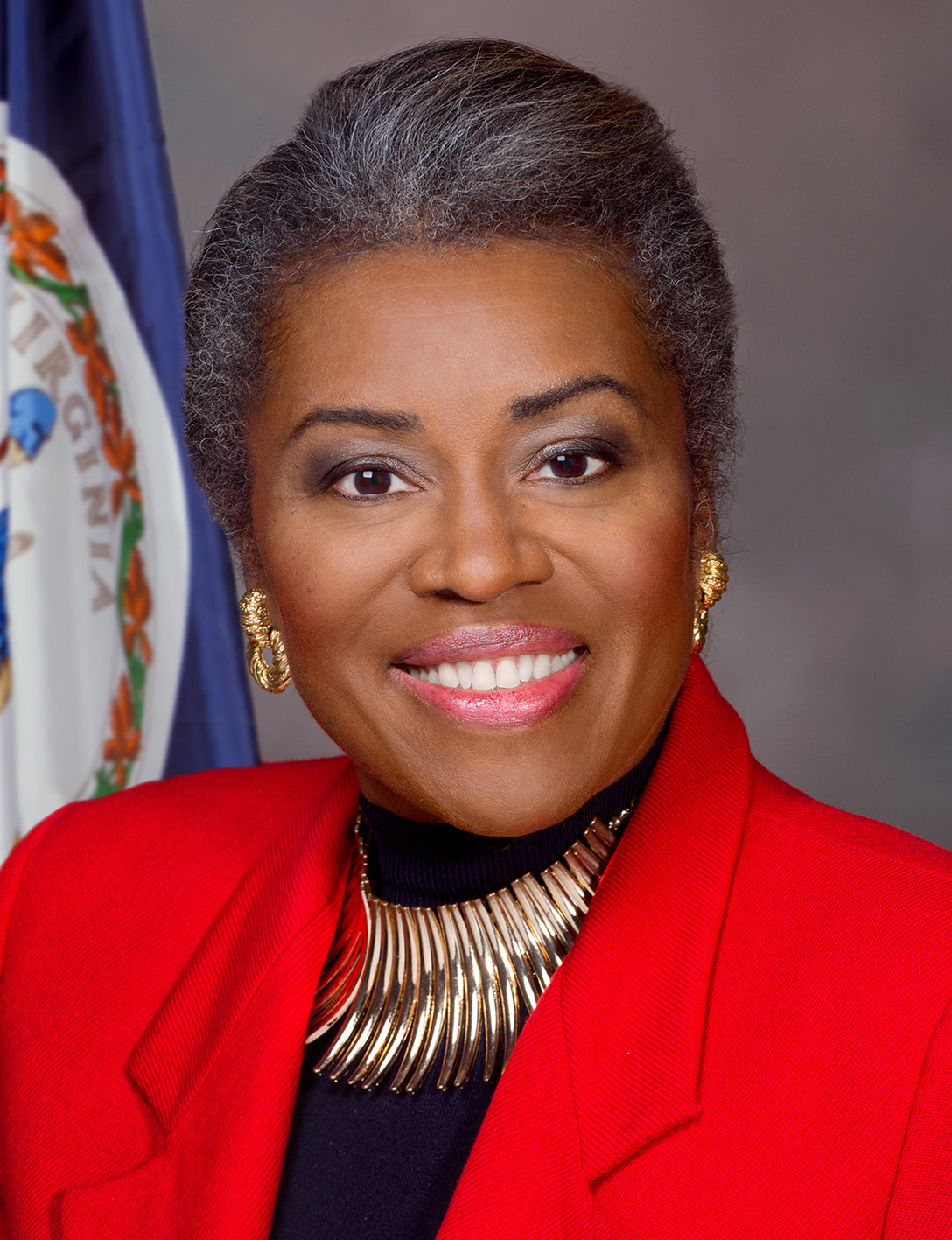

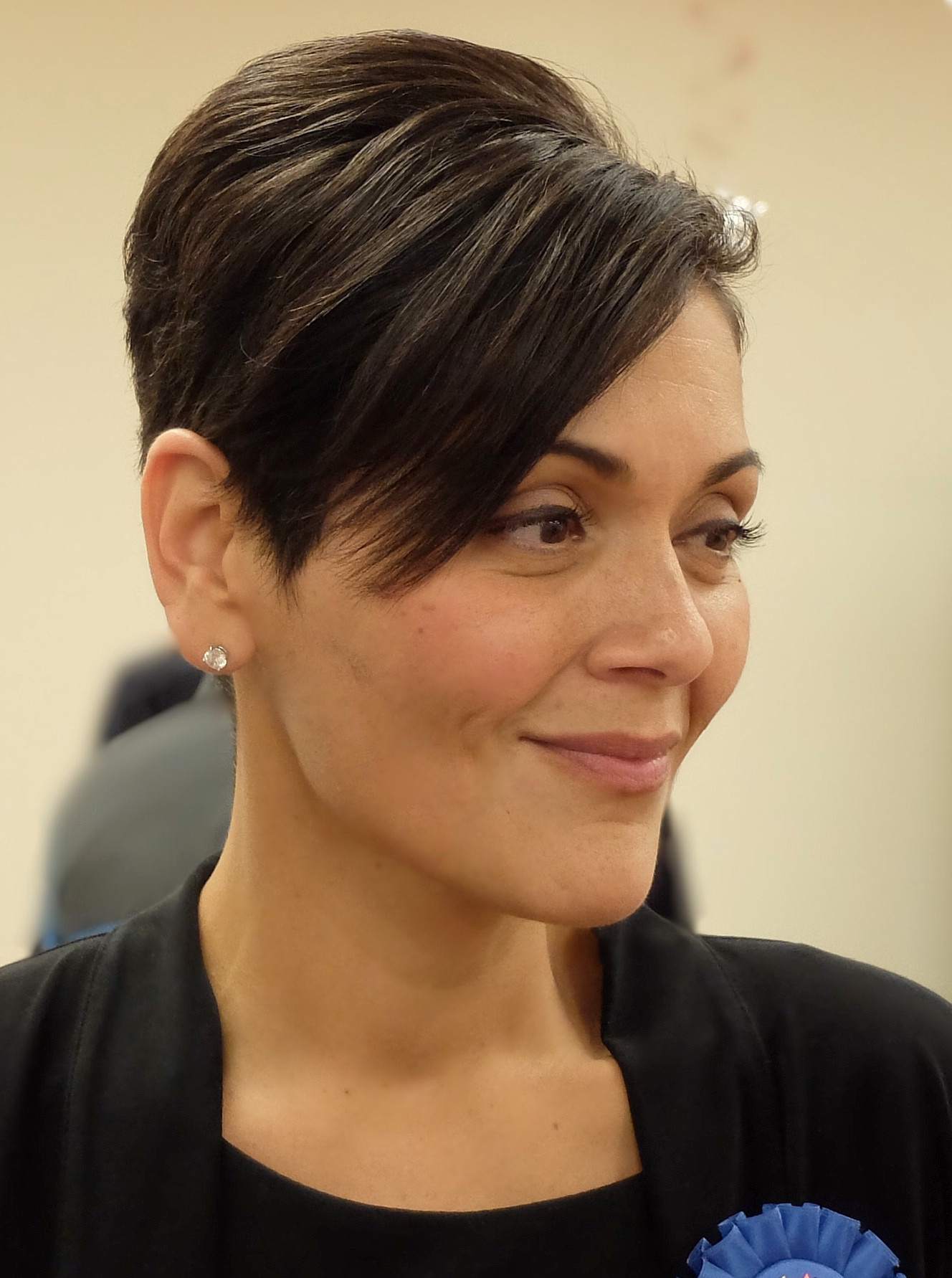
Nominee	Winsome Earle-Sears	Hala Ayala
Party	Republican	Democratic
Popular vote	1,658,332	1,608,030
Percentage	50.71%	49.17%
- Earle-Sears: 50–60% 60–70% 70–80% 80–90% >90% Ayala: 40–50% 50–60% 60–70% 70–80% 80–90% >90% Tie: 40–50% 50% No data
Lieutenant Governor before election
Justin Fairfax
Democratic
Elected Lieutenant Governor
Winsome Earle-Sears
Republican

The 2021 Virginia lieutenant gubernatorial election was held on November 2, 2021, to elect the lieutenant governor of Virginia. Republican former state delegate Winsome Earle-Sears defeated Democratic state delegate Hala Ayala. Earle-Sears succeeded Democratic incumbent Justin Fairfax who ran for the Democratic gubernatorial nomination.

Ayala won the Democratic primary held on June 8, 2021, with 38% of the vote. Earle-Sears won the Republican nomination through a convention held on May 8. Either candidate would have become the first female lieutenant governor of Virginia.

Sears won as part of the Republican Party's sweep of all three of Virginia's statewide offices in the 2021 election cycle. With her victory, Earle-Sears became the first female lieutenant governor of Virginia and the first woman of color to win a statewide election in Virginia.

On November 3, Hala Ayala conceded the race.

== Democratic primary ==
=== Candidates ===
==== Nominee ====
- Hala Ayala, state delegate

==== Eliminated in primary ====
- Mark Levine, state delegate and candidate for Virginia's 8th congressional district in 2014
- Andria McClellan, Norfolk city councilwoman
- Sean Perryman, president of the Fairfax County NAACP
- Sam Rasoul, state delegate and nominee for Virginia's 6th congressional district in 2008
- Xavier Warren, sports agent

==== Withdrawn ====
- Paul Goldman, former chair of the Virginia Democratic Party
- Elizabeth Guzmán, state delegate (ran for re-election)
- Kellen Squire, nurse

==== Declined ====
- Justin Fairfax, incumbent lieutenant governor (ran for governor)

=== Endorsements ===
Hala Ayala

Statewide officials

- Ralph Northam, governor of Virginia (2018–2022)

State delegates

- ~~Joshua G. Cole, HD-28 (2020–present)~~ (withdrawn candidate; subsequently endorsed Rasoul)
- Eileen Filler-Corn, speaker of the House of Delegates (2020–2022) from HD-41 (2010–2024)
- Charniele Herring, majority leader of the House of Delegates (2020–2022) from HD-46 (2009–present)
- Clint Jenkins, HD-76 (2020–2024)
- Danica Roem, HD-13 (2018–2024)

Organizations

- EMILY's List
- Moms Demand Action (co-endorsement with McClellan, Perryman, Rasoul, and Warren)
Mark Levine

Organizations

- LGBTQ Victory Fund

Newspapers

- Falls Church News-Press
Andria McClellan

U.S. representatives

- Elaine Luria, VA-02 (2019–2023)
- Glenn Nye, former VA-02 (2009–2011)

Statewide officials

- Karen Jackson, former Virginia secretary of technology (2014–2018)

State legislators

- Lynwood Lewis, SD-06 (2014–2024)
- Dave W. Marsden, SD-37 (2010–present)

Organizations

- Moms Demand Action (co-endorsement with Ayala, Perryman, Rasoul, and Warren)
Sean Perryman

State delegates

- Kaye Kory, HD-38 (2010–2024)

Local officials

- Sharon Bulova, former chair, Fairfax County Board of Supervisors
- Steve Descano, Fairfax County, Virginia commonwealth's attorney
- John Foust, Fairfax County Board of Supervisors
- Jeff McKay, chair, Fairfax County Board of Supervisors
- Phyllis Randall, chair, Loudoun County Board of Supervisors
- James Walkinshaw, Fairfax County Board of Supervisors

Organizations

- Moms Demand Action (co-endorsement with Ayala, McClellan, Rasoul, and Warren)
Sam Rasoul

U.S. senators

- Elizabeth Warren, Massachusetts (2013–present)

State delegates

- Lashrecse Aird (D-63)
- Joshua G. Cole (D-28)
- Dan Helmer (D-40)
- Sally L. Hudson (D-57)
- Marcia Price (D-95)
- Ibraheem Samirah (D-86)
- Suhas Subramanyam (D-87)
- Kathy Tran (D-42)

State senators

- John Bell (D-13)
- Ghazala Hashmi (D-10)

Individuals

- Rick Boucher, former U.S. representative (VA-9)
- Mary Sue Terry, former attorney general of Virginia

Organizations

- CASA in Action
- Democracy For America
- Moms Demand Action (co-endorsed with Ayala, McClellan, Perryman, and Warren)
- Our Revolution
- Sunrise Movement

Newspapers

- The Washington Post
Xavier Warren

Organizations

- Moms Demand Action (co-endorsed with Ayala, McClellan, Perryman, and Rasoul)
Elizabeth Guzman (withdrawn)

State delegates

- Paul Krizek (D-44)
- Alfonso Lopez (D-49), subsequently endorsed Hala Ayala
- Ibraheem Samirah (D-86), subsequently endorsed Sam Rasoul

Organizations

- CASA in Action, subsequently endorsed Sam Rasoul

=== Polling ===
Poll source	Date(s) administered	Sample size (Note: Key: A – all adults RV – registered voters LV – likely voters V – unclear)	Margin of error	Hala Ayala	Elizabeth Guzman	Mark Levine	Andria McClellan	Sean Perryman	Sam Rasoul	Xavier Warren	Other	Undecided
Roanoke College	May 24 – June 1, 2021	637 (LV)	± 3.9%	16%	3%	7%	7%	3%	11%	2%	–	45%
Christopher Newport University	April 11–20, 2021	806 (LV)	± 3.9%	2%	4%	2%	2%	1%	12%	2%	1%	64%

=== Results ===
Results by county and independent city: Ayala: 30–40%; 40–50%; 50–60%; 60–70%; Rasoul: 20–30%; 30–40%; 40–50%; 50–60%; 60–70%; 70–80%; 80–90%; Levine: 30–40%; Warren: 30–40%; 40–50%

Democratic primary results
Party	Candidate	Votes	%
Democratic	Hala Ayala	181,168	37.64%
Democratic	Sam Rasoul	116,816	24.27%
Democratic	Mark Levine	53,735	11.16%
Democratic	Andria McClellan	51,015	10.60%
Democratic	Sean Perryman	38,925	8.09%
Democratic	Xavier Warren	19,909	4.13%
Democratic	Elizabeth Guzmán (withdrawn)	19,803	4.11%
Total votes		481,365	100.0%

== Republican convention ==
After months of uncertainty, the Republican Party of Virginia State Central Committee decided to hold an "unassembled convention" to select their nominees for governor, lieutenant governor, and attorney general, as opposed to holding a state run primary. The convention was held on May 8 using ranked choice voting.

=== Candidates ===
==== Nominated at convention ====
- Winsome Earle-Sears, former state delegate (2002–2004), nominee for Virginia's 3rd congressional district in 2004 and write-in candidate for the U.S. Senate in 2018

==== Defeated at convention ====
- Puneet Ahluwalia, business consultant
- Lance Allen, security company executive
- Glenn Davis, state delegate and candidate for lieutenant governor in 2017
- Tim Hugo, former state delegate (2003–2020)
- Maeve Rigler, business executive

=== Endorsements ===
Tim Hugo

State delegates

- Rob Bell (R-58)

=== Results ===
Round-by-round result visualization of the ranked choice voting election

Virginia GOP Convention, lieutenant governor nominee
Candidate	Round 1		Round 2		Round 3		Round 4		Round 5	
Candidate	Votes	%	Votes	%	Votes	%	Votes	%	Votes	%
Winsome Earle-Sears	4,075.68	32.5%	4,300.11	34.3%	4,626.70	36.9%	5,425.91	43.2%	6,827.89	54.4%
Tim Hugo	2,824.17	22.5%	2,987.20	23.8%	3,184.76	25.4%	3,816.11	30.4%	5,726.11	45.6%
Glenn Davis	2,536.77	20.2%	2,675.44	21.3%	2,838.05	22.6%	3,311.97	26.4%	Eliminated	
Lance Allen	1,538.80	12.3%	1701.82	13.6%	1,904.50	15.2%	Eliminated			
Puneet Ahluwalia	818.95	6.5%	889.43	7.1%	Eliminated					
Maeve Rigler	759.62	6.1%	Eliminated							

== General election ==
=== Predictions ===
Source	Ranking	As of
Elections Daily	Lean D	November 1, 2021

=== Endorsements ===
Hala Ayala (D)

Federal officials

- Joe Biden, president of the United States (2021–2025)
- Kamala Harris, vice president of the United States (2021–2025)
- Barack Obama, former president of the United States (2009–2017)

State officials

- Ralph Northam, governor of Virginia (2018–2022)

U.S. senators

- Amy Klobuchar, U.S. senator from Minnesota (2007–present)
- Mark Warner, U.S. senator from Virginia (2009–present)

U.S. representatives

- Don Beyer, U.S. representative for Virginia's 8th congressional district (2015–present) and 36th Lieutenant Governor of Virginia (1990–1998)
- Elaine Luria, U.S. representative for Virginia's 2nd congressional district (2019–2023)
- Lauren Underwood, U.S. representative for Illinois's 14th congressional district (2019–present)

State legislators

- Joshua G. Cole, state delegate from the 28th district (2020–2022)
- Eileen Filler-Corn, state delegate from the 41st district (2010–present) and speaker of the Virginia House of Delegates (2020–present)
- Charniele Herring, state delegate from the 46th district (2009–present), majority leader of the Virginia House of Delegates (2020–2022), and former chair of the Democratic Party of Virginia (2012–2014)
- Clint Jenkins, state delegate from the 76th district (2020–present)
- Danica Roem, state delegate from the 13th district (2018–present)

Individuals

- Blake Cooper Griffin, actor
- Jaime Harrison, chair of the Democratic National Committee (2021–present)

Organizations

- Democracy for America
- EMILY's List
- Human Rights Campaign
- Moms Demand Action
- Working Families Party
Winsome Earle-Sears (R)

Federal officials

- Ben Carson, United States Secretary of Housing and Urban Development (2017–2021)
- Ken Cuccinelli, principal deputy director of U.S. Citizenship and Immigration Services (2019–2021), attorney general of Virginia (2010–2014), and nominee for governor of Virginia in 2013

State officials

- Mark Earley, former attorney general of Virginia (1998–2001) and former state senator from the 14th district (1988–1997)

U.S. senators

- Tim Scott, U.S. senator from South Carolina (2013–present)

U.S. representatives

- Ben Cline, U.S. representative for Virginia's 6th congressional district (2019–present)
- Dan Crenshaw, U.S. representative for Texas's 2nd congressional district (2019–present)
- Bob Good, U.S. representative for Virginia's 5th congressional district (2021–2025)

State legislators

- Amanda Chase, state senator from the 11th district (2016–present)
- Dave LaRock, state delegate from the 33rd district (2014–present)
- Tommy Norment, minority leader of the Virginia Senate (2020–present) from the 3rd district (1992–present)

Individuals

- E. W. Jackson, bishop, attorney, and nominee for lieutenant governor in 2013

Organizations

- American Veterans Vote
- Maggie's List
- NRA Political Victory Fund
- Republican Party of Virginia
- Republican State Leadership Committee

=== Polling ===
Poll source	Date(s) administered	Sample size	Margin of error	Hala Ayala (D)	Winsome Earle-Sears (R)	Other	Undecided
The Trafalgar Group (R)	October 29–31, 2021	1,081 (LV)	± 3.0%	47%	50%	1%	2%
Echelon Insights (R)	October 27–29, 2021	611 (LV)	± 4.0%	46%	48%	–	6%
Roanoke College	October 14–28, 2021	571 (LV)	± 4.7%	46%	44%	0%	10%
The Washington Post/Schar School	October 20–26, 2021	1,107 (RV)	± 3.5%	48%	44%	3% (Note: Neither with 2%, Would not vote with 1%, Other with 0%)	3%
The Washington Post/Schar School	October 20–26, 2021	918 (LV)	± 4.0%	50%	46%	1% (Note: Neither with 1%, Other and Would not vote with 0%)	3%
Christopher Newport University	October 17–25, 2021	944 (LV)	± 3.5%	49%	48%	–	3%
Suffolk University	October 21–24, 2021	500 (LV)	± 4.4%	46%	44%	–	10%
co/efficient (R) (Note: This poll was sponsored by Sears's campaign.)	October 20–21, 2021	785 (LV)	± 3.5%	46%	47%	–	7%
Cygnal (R)	October 19–21, 2021	816 (LV)	± 3.4%	47%	47%	–	6%
Virginia Commonwealth University	October 9–21, 2021	722 (LV)	± 6.4%	36%	35%	16%	13%
Data for Progress (D)	October 4–15, 2021	1,589 (LV)	± 2.0%	47%	42%	3%	8%
Christopher Newport University	September 27 – October 6, 2021	802 (LV)	± 4.2%	48%	44%	–	8%
Roanoke College	September 12–26, 2021	603 (LV)	± 4.6%	45%	40%	1%	14%
KAConsulting LLC (R) (Note: This poll was sponsored by the Presidential Coalition.)	September 17–19, 2021	700 (LV)	± 3.7%	34%	24%	3%	40%
Virginia Commonwealth University	September 7–15, 2021	731 (LV)	± 6.9%	33%	30%	20%	16%
University of Mary Washington	September 7–13, 2021	1,000 (A)	± 3.1%	38%	38%	6% (Note: None/Would not vote with 4%, other candidate with 2%)	18%
University of Mary Washington	September 7–13, 2021	528 (LV)	± 4.1%	41%	47%	2% (Note: None/Would not vote and other candidate with 1%)	10%
Monmouth University	August 24–29, 2021	802 (RV)	± 3.5%	43%	42%	2%	14%
Christopher Newport University	August 15–23, 2021	800 (LV)	± 3.6%	52%	42%	1%	6%
Roanoke College	August 3–17, 2021	558 (LV)	± 4.2%	42%	36%	2%	20%
Virginia Commonwealth University	August 4–15, 2021	770 (RV)	± 5.4%	38%	31%	19%	12%
Virginia Commonwealth University	August 4–15, 2021	~747 (LV)	± 5.5%	39%	31%	17%	12%
JMC Analytics and Polling (R)	June 9–12, 2021	550 (LV)	± 4.2%	42%	36%	–	22%

== Results ==
Hopewell was the lone county or city that voted for different parties for governor and lieutenant governor, as it voted for Republican Glenn Youngkin for the former and Democrat Hala Ayala for the latter.

2021 Virginia lieutenant gubernatorial election
Party	Candidate	Votes	%	±%
Republican	Winsome Earle-Sears	1,658,332	50.71%	+3.53%
Democratic	Hala Ayala	1,608,030	49.17%	−3.55%
Write-in		3,807	0.12%	+0.03%
Total votes		3,270,169	100.00%	N/A
Republican gain from Democratic				

=== By county and independent city ===
Locality	Hala Ayala Democratic		Winsome Earle-Sears Republican		Write-in Various		Margin		Total votes cast
Locality	#	%	#	%	#	%	#	%	Total votes cast
Accomack	4,954	38.71%	7,838	61.25%	5	0.04%	2,884	22.54%	12,797
Albemarle	31,561	61.79%	19,465	38.11%	50	0.10%	−12,096	−23.68%	51,076
Alexandria	43,983	76.07%	13,730	23.75%	104	0.18%	−30,253	−52.33%	57,817
Alleghany	1,609	26.61%	4,431	73.29%	6	0.10%	2,822	46.68%	6,046
Amelia	1,632	25.80%	4,687	74.09%	7	0.11%	3,055	48.29%	6,326
Amherst	4,004	29.36%	9,624	70.57%	10	0.07%	5,620	41.21%	13,638
Appomattox	1,460	19.76%	5,922	80.14%	8	0.11%	4,462	60.38%	7,390
Arlington	72,990	77.16%	21,427	22.65%	175	0.19%	−51,563	−54.51%	94,592
Augusta	7,196	21.50%	26,259	78.44%	22	0.07%	19,063	56.94%	33,477
Bath	425	21.98%	1,509	78.02%	0	0.00%	1,084	56.05%	1,934
Bedford	8,248	21.21%	30,604	78.70%	33	0.08%	22,356	57.49%	38,885
Bland	389	14.81%	2,236	85.15%	1	0.04%	1,847	70.34%	2,626
Botetourt	4,090	23.99%	12,940	75.90%	18	0.11%	8,850	51.91%	17,048
Bristol	1,319	26.02%	3,745	73.88%	5	0.10%	2,426	47.86%	5,069
Brunswick	3,193	52.67%	2,866	47.28%	3	0.05%	−327	−5.39%	6,062
Buchanan	898	15.25%	4,976	84.48%	16	0.27%	4,078	69.24%	5,890
Buckingham	2,224	36.39%	3,883	63.54%	4	0.07%	1,659	27.15%	6,111
Buena Vista	528	27.13%	1,415	72.71%	3	0.15%	887	45.58%	1,946
Campbell	5,050	21.84%	18,058	78.09%	17	0.07%	13,008	56.25%	23,125
Caroline	5,092	42.41%	6,905	57.50%	11	0.09%	1,813	15.10%	12,008
Carroll	1,999	17.04%	9,720	82.87%	10	0.09%	7,721	65.83%	11,729
Charles City	1,800	53.36%	1,572	46.61%	1	0.03%	−228	−6.76%	3,373
Charlotte	1,428	30.08%	3,314	69.80%	6	0.13%	1,886	39.72%	4,748
Charlottesville	14,352	83.47%	2,828	16.45%	15	0.09%	−11,524	−67.02%	17,195
Chesapeake	42,936	46.90%	48,519	53.00%	95	0.10%	5,583	6.10%	91,550
Chesterfield	74,774	47.99%	80,862	51.90%	170	0.11%	6,088	3.91%	155,806
Clarke	2,772	37.50%	4,611	62.38%	9	0.12%	1,839	24.88%	7,392
Colonial Heights	1,784	26.84%	4,852	73.01%	10	0.15%	3,068	46.16%	6,646
Covington	628	35.28%	1,152	64.72%	0	0.00%	524	29.44%	1,780
Craig	445	17.89%	2,034	81.79%	8	0.32%	1,589	63.89%	2,487
Culpeper	6,773	33.64%	13,346	66.28%	16	0.08%	6,573	32.64%	20,135
Cumberland	1,521	36.21%	2,677	63.74%	2	0.05%	1,156	27.52%	4,200
Danville	6,852	53.86%	5,860	46.07%	9	0.07%	−992	−7.80%	12,721
Dickenson	972	20.38%	3,796	79.58%	2	0.04%	2,824	59.20%	4,770
Dinwiddie	4,225	36.66%	7,288	63.24%	11	0.10%	3,063	26.58%	11,524
Emporia	1,091	60.14%	720	39.69%	3	0.17%	−371	−20.45%	1,814
Essex	1,975	42.16%	2,707	57.78%	3	0.06%	732	15.62%	4,685
Fairfax City	6,502	64.61%	3,548	35.26%	13	0.13%	−2,954	−29.36%	10,063
Fairfax County	286,540	65.39%	150,939	34.45%	694	0.16%	−135,601	−30.95%	438,173
Falls Church	5,415	77.76%	1,537	22.07%	12	0.17%	−3,878	−55.69%	6,964
Fauquier	11,732	34.61%	22,134	65.30%	28	0.08%	10,402	30.69%	33,894
Floyd	2,275	30.55%	5,161	69.30%	11	0.15%	2,886	38.75%	7,447
Fluvanna	5,247	42.41%	7,119	57.54%	7	0.06%	1,872	15.13%	12,373
Franklin City	1,659	56.54%	1,275	43.46%	0	0.00%	−384	−13.09%	2,934
Franklin County	6,154	25.99%	17,508	73.94%	18	0.08%	11,354	47.95%	23,680
Frederick	11,302	31.20%	24,901	68.73%	26	0.07%	13,599	37.54%	36,229
Fredericksburg	5,453	60.88%	3,490	38.96%	14	0.16%	−1,963	−21.92%	8,957
Galax	515	26.98%	1,393	72.97%	1	0.05%	878	45.99%	1,909
Giles	1,632	22.35%	5,665	77.58%	5	0.07%	4,033	55.23%	7,302
Gloucester	4,712	27.24%	12,572	72.69%	11	0.06%	7,860	45.45%	17,295
Goochland	4,909	33.87%	9,573	66.04%	13	0.09%	4,664	32.18%	14,495
Grayson	1,118	18.07%	5,064	81.85%	5	0.08%	3,946	63.78%	6,187
Greene	2,801	31.84%	5,991	68.11%	4	0.05%	3,190	36.27%	8,796
Greensville	1,911	52.97%	1,695	46.98%	2	0.06%	−216	−5.99%	3,608
Halifax	4,805	35.79%	8,612	64.15%	7	0.05%	3,807	28.36%	13,424
Hampton	29,878	66.61%	14,922	33.27%	52	0.12%	−14,956	−33.35%	44,852
Hanover	18,203	31.52%	39,478	68.37%	62	0.11%	21,275	36.84%	57,743
Harrisonburg	6,795	60.39%	4,443	39.49%	14	0.12%	−2,352	−20.90%	11,252
Henrico	82,161	59.48%	55,822	40.41%	159	0.12%	−26,339	−19.07%	138,142
Henry	5,655	30.79%	12,694	69.12%	15	0.08%	7,039	38.33%	18,364
Highland	339	26.24%	953	73.76%	0	0.00%	614	47.52%	1,292
Hopewell	3,130	50.18%	3,095	49.62%	12	0.19%	−35	−0.56%	6,237
Isle of Wight	6,532	35.19%	12,010	64.70%	21	0.11%	5,478	29.51%	18,563
James City	18,675	46.76%	21,231	53.16%	31	0.08%	2,556	6.40%	39,937
King and Queen	1,145	35.35%	2,089	64.50%	5	0.15%	944	29.14%	3,239
King George	3,362	31.54%	7,286	68.36%	10	0.09%	3,924	36.82%	10,658
King William	2,291	26.85%	6,240	73.12%	3	0.04%	3,949	46.27%	8,534
Lancaster	2,399	41.03%	3,441	58.85%	7	0.12%	1,042	17.82%	5,847
Lee	891	12.37%	6,305	87.52%	8	0.11%	5,414	75.15%	7,204
Lexington	1,305	63.26%	755	36.60%	3	0.15%	−550	−26.66%	2,063
Loudoun	89,636	55.64%	71,272	44.24%	196	0.12%	−18,364	−11.40%	161,104
Louisa	5,932	33.80%	11,598	66.09%	20	0.11%	5,666	32.28%	17,550
Lunenburg	1,584	34.62%	2,984	65.22%	7	0.15%	1,400	30.60%	4,575
Lynchburg	11,053	44.68%	13,658	55.21%	29	0.12%	2,605	10.53%	24,740
Madison	1,990	29.79%	4,686	70.16%	3	0.04%	2,696	40.37%	6,679
Manassas	6,238	55.44%	4,990	44.35%	23	0.20%	−1,248	−11.09%	11,251
Manassas Park	2,209	61.69%	1,368	38.20%	4	0.11%	−841	−23.49%	3,581
Martinsville	2,244	57.39%	1,662	42.51%	4	0.10%	−582	−14.88%	3,910
Mathews	1,348	27.75%	3,504	72.13%	6	0.12%	2,156	44.38%	4,858
Mecklenburg	4,064	33.93%	7,902	65.98%	10	0.08%	3,838	32.05%	11,976
Middlesex	1,882	33.72%	3,698	66.25%	2	0.04%	1,816	32.53%	5,582
Montgomery	15,613	48.00%	16,867	51.86%	44	0.14%	1,254	3.86%	32,524
Nelson	3,416	44.71%	4,211	55.11%	14	0.18%	795	10.40%	7,641
New Kent	3,484	28.95%	8,544	70.99%	8	0.07%	5,060	42.04%	12,036
Newport News	32,381	60.05%	21,473	39.82%	72	0.13%	−10,908	−20.23%	53,926
Norfolk	40,388	67.57%	19,294	32.28%	93	0.16%	−21,094	−35.29%	59,775
Northampton	2,552	48.84%	2,671	51.12%	2	0.04%	119	2.28%	5,225
Northumberland	2,340	36.10%	4,136	63.81%	6	0.09%	1,796	27.71%	6,482
Norton	325	27.33%	860	72.33%	4	0.34%	535	45.00%	1,189
Nottoway	1,896	35.16%	3,490	64.73%	6	0.11%	1,594	29.56%	5,392
Orange	5,398	33.64%	10,630	66.25%	18	0.11%	5,232	32.61%	16,046
Page	2,045	21.45%	7,480	78.44%	11	0.12%	5,435	56.99%	9,536
Patrick	1,293	17.99%	5,889	81.95%	4	0.06%	4,596	63.96%	7,186
Petersburg	7,592	85.46%	1,272	14.32%	20	0.23%	−6,320	−71.14%	8,884
Pittsylvania	6,428	24.88%	19,396	75.06%	15	0.06%	12,968	50.19%	25,839
Poquoson	1,356	21.65%	4,898	78.19%	10	0.16%	3,542	56.55%	6,264
Portsmouth	19,401	65.52%	10,177	34.37%	31	0.10%	−9,224	−31.15%	29,609
Powhatan	3,779	23.15%	12,529	76.76%	15	0.09%	8,750	53.61%	16,323
Prince Edward	3,209	45.33%	3,861	54.54%	9	0.13%	652	9.21%	7,079
Prince George	4,613	35.04%	8,544	64.90%	8	0.06%	3,931	29.86%	13,165
Prince William	88,335	57.83%	64,250	42.06%	165	0.11%	−24,085	−15.77%	152,750
Pulaski	3,419	26.41%	9,514	73.50%	12	0.09%	6,095	47.08%	12,945
Radford	1,923	46.13%	2,234	53.59%	12	0.29%	311	7.46%	4,169
Rappahannock	1,721	41.11%	2,463	58.84%	2	0.05%	742	17.73%	4,186
Richmond City	63,199	79.39%	16,246	20.41%	157	0.20%	−46,953	−58.98%	79,602
Richmond County	961	30.29%	2,212	69.71%	0	0.00%	1,251	39.43%	3,173
Roanoke City	16,941	58.63%	11,898	41.18%	57	0.20%	−5,043	−17.45%	28,896
Roanoke County	14,673	34.43%	27,899	65.46%	46	0.11%	13,226	31.03%	42,618
Rockbridge	3,152	31.57%	6,825	68.37%	6	0.06%	3,673	36.79%	9,983
Rockingham	8,495	24.08%	26,745	75.82%	36	0.10%	18,250	51.73%	35,276
Russell	1,469	15.31%	8,121	84.65%	4	0.04%	6,652	69.34%	9,594
Salem	3,372	35.54%	6,102	64.32%	13	0.14%	2,730	28.78%	9,487
Scott	1,056	13.14%	6,973	86.76%	8	0.10%	5,917	73.62%	8,037
Shenandoah	4,627	25.41%	13,566	74.49%	19	0.10%	8,939	49.08%	18,212
Smyth	1,742	17.10%	8,439	82.82%	9	0.09%	6,697	65.72%	10,190
Southampton	2,710	34.76%	5,079	65.15%	7	0.09%	2,369	30.39%	7,796
Spotsylvania	21,638	40.01%	32,413	59.93%	35	0.06%	10,775	19.92%	54,086
Stafford	25,839	45.05%	31,463	54.86%	48	0.08%	5,624	9.81%	57,350
Staunton	5,003	51.57%	4,686	48.30%	13	0.13%	−317	−3.27%	9,702
Suffolk	19,016	52.05%	17,476	47.84%	41	0.11%	−1,540	−4.22%	36,533
Surry	1,744	49.59%	1,770	50.33%	3	0.09%	26	0.74%	3,517
Sussex	2,015	50.46%	1,972	49.39%	6	0.15%	−43	−1.08%	3,993
Tazewell	1,850	13.36%	11,992	86.63%	1	0.01%	10,142	73.26%	13,843
Virginia Beach	73,997	45.87%	87,170	54.04%	145	0.09%	13,173	8.17%	161,312
Warren	4,421	28.25%	11,203	71.58%	28	0.18%	6,782	43.33%	15,652
Washington	4,459	20.40%	17,387	79.53%	16	0.07%	12,928	59.13%	21,862
Waynesboro	3,273	42.01%	4,508	57.86%	10	0.13%	1,235	15.85%	7,791
Westmoreland	3,000	39.62%	4,559	60.21%	13	0.17%	1,559	20.59%	7,572
Williamsburg	3,186	64.97%	1,711	34.89%	7	0.14%	−1,475	−30.08%	4,904
Winchester	4,324	51.15%	4,122	48.76%	8	0.09%	−202	−2.39%	8,454
Wise	1,867	16.31%	9,570	83.60%	11	0.10%	7,703	67.29%	11,448
Wythe	2,167	18.87%	9,308	81.04%	11	0.10%	7,141	62.17%	11,486
York	12,132	40.78%	17,593	59.14%	23	0.08%	5,461	18.36%	29,748
Totals	1,608,030	49.17%	1,658,332	50.71%	3,807	0.12%	50,302	1.54%	3,270,169

Counties and independent cities that flipped from Democratic to Republican

- Chesapeake (independent city)
- Montgomery (largest municipality: Blacksburg)
- Northampton (largest municipality: Exmore)
- Prince Edward (largest municipality: Farmville)
- Radford (independent city)
- Surry (largest municipality: Claremont)

Counties and independent cities that flipped from Republican to Democratic

- Hopewell (independent city)

=== By congressional district ===
Earle-Sears won six of 11 congressional districts, including two that were represented by Democrats.

District	Ayala	Earle-Sears	Representative
1st	41%	59%	Rob Wittman
2nd	46%	54%	Elaine Luria
3rd	62%	38%	Bobby Scott
4th	57%	43%	Donald McEachin
5th	40%	60%	Bob Good
6th	34%	66%	Ben Cline
7th	45%	55%	Abigail Spanberger
8th	73%	27%	Don Beyer
9th	26%	74%	Morgan Griffith
10th	52%	47%	Jennifer Wexton
11th	67%	33%	Gerry Connolly

== Exit poll ==
2021 Virginia lieutenant gubernatorial election voter demographics (CNN)
Demographic subgroup	Earle-Sears	Ayala	% of total vote
Ideology
Liberals	5	94	23
Moderates	39	61	41
Conservatives	93	7	36
Party
Democrats	4	96	36
Republicans	95	4	34
Independents	55	45	30
Gender
Men	55	44	48
Women	47	53	52
Race/ethnicity
White	61	39	73
Black	16	84	16
Latino	32	67	5
Asian	36	64	3
Gender by race
White men	65	35	36
White women	57	43	37
Black men	16	84	7
Black women	15	85	9
Latino men (of any race)	N/A	N/A	2
Latino women (of any race)	25	75	3
Other racial/ethnic groups	38	62	5
Age
18–24 years old	42	58	5
25–29 years old	43	57	5
30–39 years old	47	52	13
40–49 years old	51	48	18
50–64 years old	52	48	34
65 and older	54	46	26
2020 presidential vote
Biden	7	93	48
Trump	97	3	44
Biden job approval
Approve	6	94	46
Disapprove	91	9	53
Education
Never attended college	62	38	15
Some college education	58	42	24
Associate degree	57	43	12
Bachelor's degree	45	55	25
Advanced degree	39	61	24
Education by race
White college graduates	47	53	37
White no college degree	75	25	36
Non-white college graduates	24	76	11
Non-white no college degree	23	77	15
Education by gender/race
White women with college degrees	40	60	18
White women without college degrees	73	27	19
White men with college degrees	55	45	19
White men without college degrees	76	24	17
Non-white	23	76	27
Issue regarded as most important
Taxes	69	31	15
Economy	55	44	33
Education	53	47	24
Coronavirus	16	84	15
Abortion	54	46	8
Region
DC suburbs	35	65	29
Central Virginia	58	42	18
Hampton Roads	45	55	15
Richmond/Southside	53	47	18
Mountain	70	30	20
Population density
City over 50,000	31	69	21
Suburban	54	46	60
Rural	62	37	19

== See also ==
- 2021 United States elections
- 2021 Virginia gubernatorial election
- 2021 Virginia Attorney General election
- 2021 Virginia House of Delegates election
- 2021 Virginia elections

== Notes ==
Partisan clients
