= 2021 Virginia gubernatorial election =

- November 2, 2021
- Turnout: 54.9% ▲7.7 pp
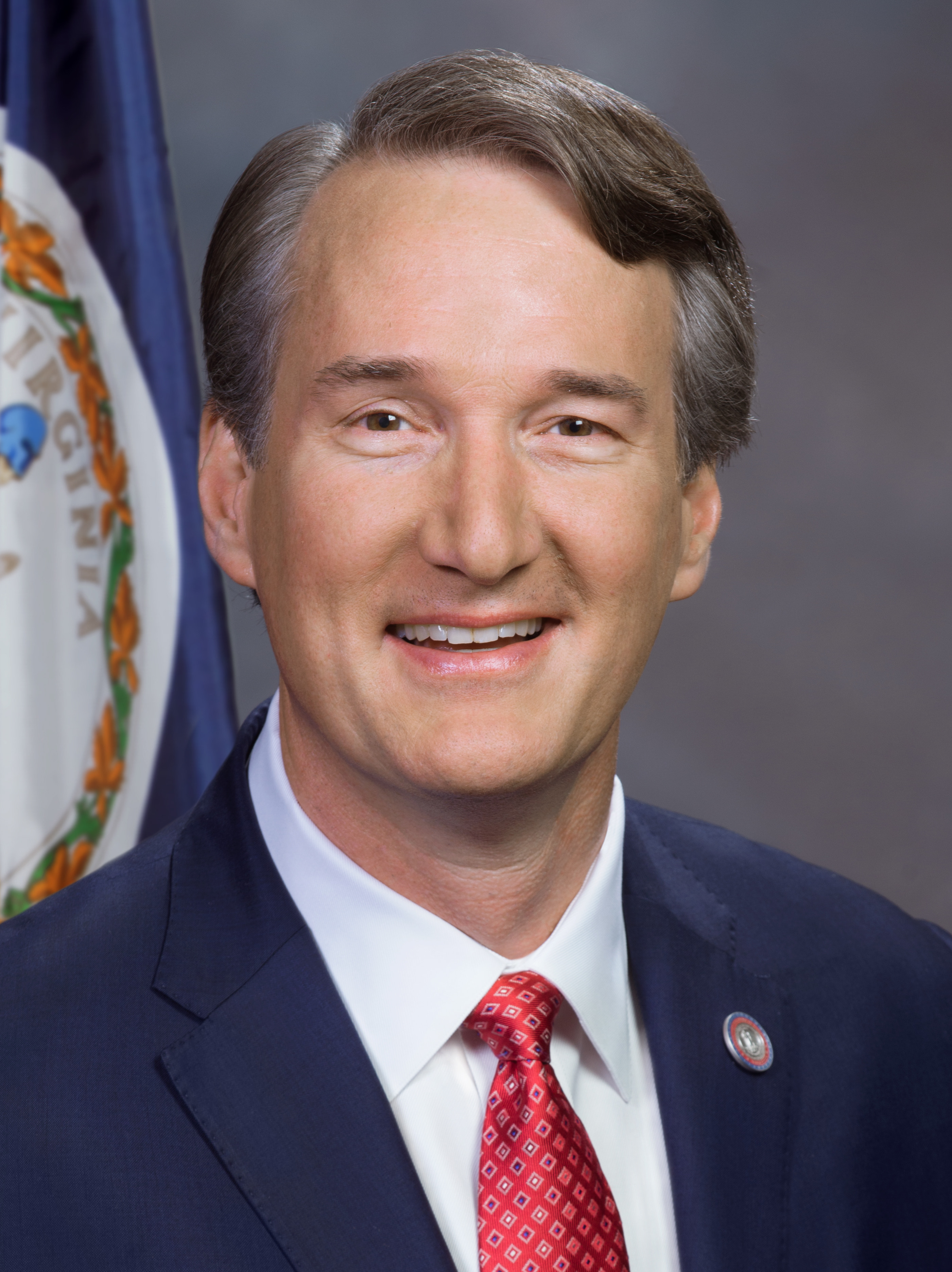

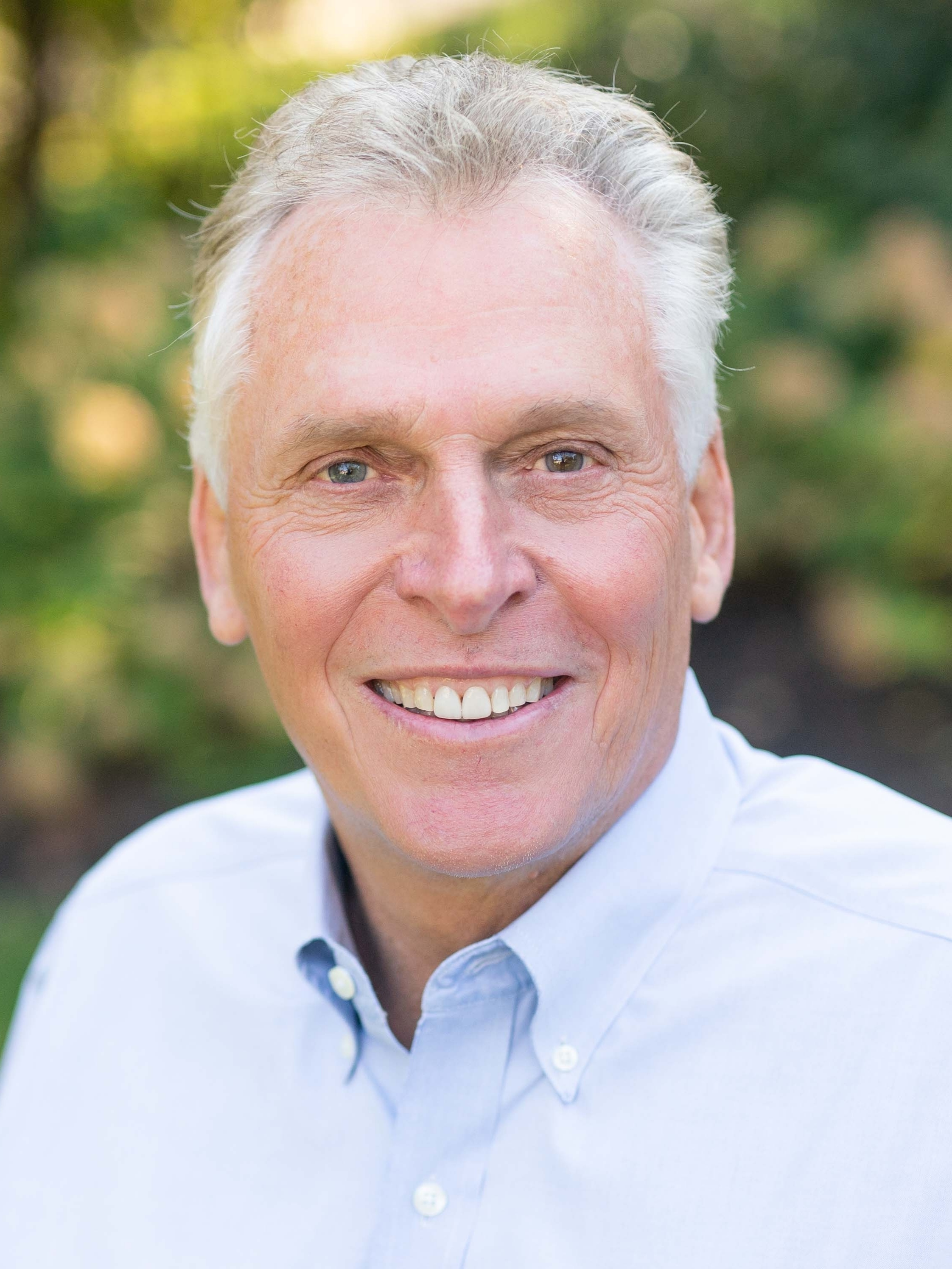
Nominee	Glenn Youngkin	Terry McAuliffe
Party	Republican	Democratic
Popular vote	1,663,158	1,599,470
Percentage	50.58%	48.64%
- Youngkin: 40–50% 50–60% 60–70% 70–80% 80–90% >90% McAuliffe: 40–50% 50–60% 60–70% 70–80% 80–90% >90% Tie: 40–50% 50% No data
Governor before election
Ralph Northam
Democratic
Elected Governor
Glenn Youngkin
Republican

The 2021 Virginia gubernatorial election was held on November 2, 2021, to elect the governor of Virginia. Republican businessman Glenn Youngkin defeated Democratic former governor Terry McAuliffe. Youngkin succeeded Democratic incumbent Ralph Northam who was term-limited and ineligible to seek a second consecutive term.

The Democratic Party held its primary elections on June 8, 2021. McAuliffe won the primary with 62% of the vote. The Republican Party held its convention on May 8, 2021, in which Youngkin won the nomination on May 10.

At the start of the general election, McAuliffe was widely considered to be the favorite, but Youngkin closed the gap throughout most of the fall, leading most analysts to label the election as a toss-up. Youngkin ended up narrowly defeating McAuliffe by 63,688 votes. Youngkin's coattails seemingly benefitted fellow down-ballot candidates Winsome Earle-Sears and Jason Miyares who concurrently won elections for Lieutenant Governor and Attorney General; 2021 remains the only time the Republican Party has won statewide elections in Virginia since 2009. The economy, education, public health, and cultural issues were centerpieces of Youngkin's campaign. Youngkin promised to ban the teaching of critical race theory within public schools on "day one", push back against certain COVID-19 restrictions including vaccination mandates and mask mandates, and advocate for small government within the state of Virginia.

Democrats tried to portray Youngkin as a political ally of Donald Trump, who lost Virginia in 2020, and Trump did indeed express support for Youngkin. Walking a fine line between welcoming the endorsement and demonstrating independence, Youngkin was successfully able to appeal to both Republicans and independents. Political analysts believe that the main reason for the Democratic Party's defeat in Virginia was that voters were not satisfied with the performance of President Joe Biden, with whom McAuliffe allied himself.

== Democratic primary ==
=== Candidates ===
==== Nominee ====
- Terry McAuliffe, former governor of Virginia (2014–2018) and former chair of the Democratic National Committee (2001–2005)

==== Eliminated in primary ====
- Jennifer Carroll Foy, former state delegate for Virginia's 2nd House of Delegates district (2018–2020)
- Lee J. Carter, state delegate for Virginia's 50th House of Delegates district
- Justin Fairfax, lieutenant governor of Virginia
- Jennifer McClellan, state senator for Virginia's 9th Senate district and former delegate for Virginia's 71st House of Delegates district (2006–2017)

==== Declined ====
- Mark Herring, attorney general of Virginia (2014–2022) and former state senator for Virginia's 33rd Senate district (2006–2014) (ran for re-election)

=== Endorsements ===
Jennifer Carroll Foy

U.S. representatives

- Katie Porter, CA-45 (2019–2025)
- Lauren Underwood, IL-14 (2019–present)

State legislators

- 2 state delegates (Note: Joshua Cole, HD-28 (2020–2022); Danica Roem, HD-13 (2018–2024))

Local officials

- Juli Briskman, member of the Loudoun County board of supervisors (2020–present)

Individuals

- Ben Jealous, former president of the NAACP (2008–2013)
- Qasim Rashid, Muslim activst
- Gloria Steinem, feminist activist

Organizations

- Democracy for America
- EMILY's List
- Feminist Majority PAC
- March On
- Moms Demand Action (co-endorsement with McAuliffe and McClellan)
- Sunrise Movement
- Working Families Party

Labor unions

- Amalgamated Transit Union
- United Brotherhood of Carpenters and Joiners of America
Lee J. Carter

Individual

- Marianne Williamson, author and perennial candidate
Justin Fairfax

Foreign politician

- Nicholas Fairfax, 14th Lord Fairfax of Cameron, member of the House of Lords of the United Kingdom (Conservative Party)
Terry McAuliffe

U.S. representatives

- Elaine Luria, VA-02 (2019–2023)
- Jim Moran, former VA-08 (1991–2015)
- Nancy Pelosi, speaker of the House (2007–2011, 2019–2023) from CA-12 (1987–present)

Statewide officials

- Ralph Northam, governor of Virginia (2018–2022)

State delegates

- Karrie Delaney, state delegate for Virginia's 67th House of Delegates district
- Eileen Filler-Corn, speaker of the Virginia House of Delegates, state delegate for Virginia's 41st House of Delegates district and former chair of the Democratic Party of Virginia
- Charniele Herring, majority leader of the Virginia House of Delegates, state delegate for Virginia's 46th House of Delegates district
- Chris Hurst, state delegate for Virginia's 12th House of Delegates district
- Delores McQuinn, state delegate for Virginia's 70th House of Delegates district
- Martha Mugler, state delegate for Virginia's 91st House of Delegates district
- Kathleen Murphy, state delegate for Virginia's 34th House of Delegates district
- David A. Reid, state delegate for Virginia's 32nd House of Delegates district
- Shelly Simonds, state delegate for Virginia's 94th House of Delegates district
- Suhas Subramanyam, state delegate for Virginia's 48th House of Delegates district
- Rip Sullivan, state delegate for Virginia's 87th House of Delegates district
- Luke Torian, state delegate for Virginia's 52nd House of Delegates district
- David Toscano, former minority leader of the Virginia House of Delegates, state delegate for Virginia's 57th House of Delegates district and former mayor of Charlottesville
- Roslyn Tyler, state delegate for Virginia's 75th House of Delegates district
- Schuyler VanValkenburg, state delegate for Virginia's 72nd House of Delegates district
- Vivian Watts, state delegate for Virginia's 39th House of Delegates district, former Virginia secretary of transportation and public safety (1986–1990)

State senators

- John Bell, state senator for Virginia's 13th Senate district
- Barbara Favola, state senator for Virginia's 31st Senate district
- Janet Howell, state senator for Virginia's 32nd Senate district
- L. Louise Lucas, state senator for Virginia's 18th Senate district (1992–present), president pro tempore of the Senate of Virginia (2020–present)

Local officials

- Steve Descano, Fairfax County commonwealth's attorney
- John Foust (Dranesville), member of the Fairfax County Board of Supervisors
- Penelope Gross (Mason), vice chair of the Fairfax County Board of Supervisors
- Stacey Kincaid, Fairfax County sheriff
- Jeff McKay (at-large), chair of the Fairfax County Board of Supervisors
- Levar Stoney, mayor of Richmond and former secretary of the Commonwealth of Virginia

Labor unions

- AFSCME
- NATCA

Newspapers

- The Washington Post

Individuals

- Sharon Bulova, former chair of the Fairfax County Board of Supervisors
- Richard Cranwell, former majority leader of the Virginia House of Delegates, former minority leader of the Virginia House of Delegates, and former chair of the Democratic Party of Virginia
- John Grisham, author

Organizations

- Moms Demand Action (co-endorsed with Carroll Foy and McClellan)
Jennifer McClellan

State delegates

- Ken Plum (Fairfax County)
- Kathy Tran (Fairfax County)

State senators

- Jennifer Boysko (Herndon), former state delegate
- Ghazala Hashmi (Chesterfield)

Local officials

- Phyllis Randall, chair, Loudoun County Board of Supervisors
- Justin Wilson, mayor of Alexandria

Organizations

- Moms Demand Action (co-endorsed with Carroll Foy and McAuliffe)
- Our Black Party

Individuals

- Ward Armstrong, former minority leader of the Virginia House of Delegates
- Viola Baskerville, former Virginia secretary of administration and former state delegate
- Leslie Byrne, former U.S. representative for Virginia's 11th congressional district
- Patrick Gottschalk, former Virginia secretary of commerce
- Rodney Robinson, 2019 National Teacher of the Year
- Javaid Siddiqi, former Virginia secretary of education

=== Debates ===
Democratic primary debates
Date	Venue	Video	Terry McAuliffe	Jennifer Carroll Foy	Jennifer McClellan	Justin Fairfax	Lee J. Carter
April 6, 2021	Virginia State University		Participant	Participant	Participant	Participant	Participant

McClellan opened the debate by calling for a "nominee who will excite and expand our base. I've spent 31 years building this party and electing Democrats at the local, state and national level. It's not enough to give someone something to vote against. We've got to give people something to vote for," McClellan said. Foy said in her opening statement that she is presenting bold ideas that past politicians have failed to bring to Virginia. The pointed remark came before she went after the record of McAuliffe, the first criticism of the night directed at the presumptive frontrunner. Lieutenant Governor Justin Fairfax compared scrutiny of his sexual assault allegations to that of the cases of George Floyd and Emmett Till in the debate. McAuliffe mainly avoided directly responding to the attacks, focusing instead on his record as governor, the support he's received during his campaign and, stopping Glenn Youngkin in November's general election. Later in the debate, Carter called McAuliffe out for mentioning Youngkin and Trump so often. "The debate that we're supposed to be having on this stage is a debate about the future of this commonwealth," he said. "It's about what we stand for and what we're going to fight for. And this is the first opportunity for the Democratic Party to define what it is going to be after Donald Trump is gone. And he is gone. So, we can't just be a party that is opposed to the other guys. We have to fight for something." Carter, a self-described socialist, reiterated his proposal to use tax revenue from the marijuana industry to fund reparations.

=== Polling ===
Poll source	Date(s) administered	Sample size (Note: Key: A – all adults RV – registered voters LV – likely voters V – unclear)	Margin of error	Jennifer Carroll Foy	Lee Carter	Justin Fairfax	Terry McAuliffe	Jennifer McClellan	Other	Undecided
Roanoke College	May 24 – June 1, 2021	637 (LV)	± 3.9%	11%	1%	5%	49%	9%	0%	24%
Christopher Newport University	April 11–20, 2021	806 (LV)	± 3.9%	5%	1%	8%	47%	6%	2%	31%
Public Policy Polling (D)	April 12–13, 2021	526 (LV)	± 4.3%	8%	4%	7%	42%	8%	–	29%
Christopher Newport University	January 31 – February 14, 2021	488 (RV)	± 4.9%	4%	1%	12%	26%	4%	0%	54%
YouGov Blue (D)	February 6–11, 2021	235 (RV)	± 7.4%	7%	6%	6%	43%	8%	0%	30%
Global Strategy Group (D) (Note: This poll was sponsored by Carroll Foy's campaign)	January 12–20, 2021	600 (LV)	± 4.0%	7%	–	14%	42%	6%	–	30%
Expedition Strategies (D) (Note: This poll was sponsored by McClellan's campaign)	December 2020	– (LV)	–	5%	–	16%	32%	8%	–	38%

=== Results ===
Results by county and independent city: McAuliffe: 80–90%; 70–80%; 60–70%; 50–60%; 40–50%

Democratic primary results
Party	Candidate	Votes	%
Democratic	Terry McAuliffe	307,367	62.10%
Democratic	Jennifer Carroll Foy	98,052	19.81%
Democratic	Jennifer McClellan	58,213	11.76%
Democratic	Justin Fairfax	17,606	3.56%
Democratic	Lee J. Carter	13,694	2.77%
Total votes		494,932	100.0%

== Republican convention ==
The Republican nomination process for the 2021 elections was the subject of a lengthy and acrimonious debate within the Republican Party of Virginia. On December 5, 2020, the state Republican Party voted to hold a convention instead of a primary by a vote of 39 to 35. State Senator Amanda Chase initially indicated that she would run as an independent, but she later decided to seek nomination at the convention; on the day of the convention, she acknowledged that if she did not win the nomination, she may reconsider and run as an independent, although she eventually decided against this. Faced with pressure from the Chase campaign and activists to return to a primary, the state committee debated scrapping the convention on January 23, 2021. These efforts were unsuccessful and the party reaffirmed their decision to hold a convention. On February 9, 2021, the Chase campaign sued the Republican Party of Virginia, arguing that the convention is illegal under COVID-19-related executive orders signed by Governor Ralph Northam. The Richmond Circuit Court dismissed the Chase campaign's lawsuit on February 19, 2021. The Republican Party of Virginia announced on March 26, 2021, that seven gubernatorial candidates had qualified to appear on the convention ballot. On April 11, 2021, the state Republican Party Rules Committee voted to tabulate the ballots by hand; three days later, however, the committee reversed itself and decided to use a vendor's software-based tabulation method.

On April 20, 2021, five candidates (Amanda Chase, Kirk Cox, Sergio de la Peña, Peter Doran, and Glenn Youngkin) participated in a forum at Liberty University in Lynchburg. Two candidates, Octavia Johnson and Pete Snyder, did not attend the forum.

The state Republican convention to select the party's nominees for governor, lieutenant governor, and attorney general took place on May 8, 2021, in "unassembled" format, with ballots to be cast remotely at up to 37 locations statewide using ranked-choice voting. The complex process fueled internal party disputes. Up to 40,000 people were anticipated to become delegates, although not all would necessarily cast votes. Local Republican Party leaders control the application process to become a delegate, decide who can participate (voter registration in Virginia does not include a space to indicate party affiliation), and select the convention voting site. In the preceding Virginia Republican gubernatorial convention, 12,000 participated.

Orthodox Jewish Virginia Republicans asked the party to allow absentee voting for religious reasons (May 8 is on the Jewish Sabbath), but the State Central Committee initially voted down the request, failing to achieve the 75% supermajority needed to change the rules. However, the Virginia GOP ultimately reversed course and allowed those with religious objections to vote in the May 8 convention via absentee ballots. Republican candidates Kirk Cox, Peter Doran, and Glenn Youngkin had criticized the previous decision to not accommodate Orthodox Jews.

Cox received crucial endorsements of Bob McDonnell and George Allen, the former of whom was the last statewide elected Republican (alongside Bill Bolling and Ken Cuccinelli) in Virginia prior to 2022. He was regarded by some as the establishment favorite heading into the convention. Nonetheless, he finished fourth on the first voting round behind Glenn Youngkin, Pete Snyder, and Amanda Chase. Youngkin was nominated on the sixth round of voting.

=== Candidates ===
==== Nominated at convention ====
- Glenn Youngkin, former co-CEO of The Carlyle Group

==== Eliminated at convention ====
- Amanda Chase, state senator for Virginia's 11th Senate district
- Kirk Cox, state delegate for Virginia's 66th House of Delegates district and former speaker of the Virginia House of Delegates (2018–2020)
- Sergio de la Peña, former U.S. deputy assistant secretary of defense for Western Hemisphere Affairs
- Peter Doran, former CEO of the Center for European Policy Analysis
- Octavia Johnson, former sheriff of Roanoke City (2006–2013)
- Pete Snyder, entrepreneur, marketing executive, and candidate for lieutenant governor in 2013

==== Did not qualify ====
- Paul Davis
- Merle Rutledge, small government activist
- Kurt Santini, U.S. Army veteran

==== Declined ====
- Charles William Carrico Sr., former state senator for Virginia's 40th Senate district and retired state trooper (endorsed Cox)
- Neil Chatterjee, former chairman of the Federal Energy Regulatory Commission
- Barbara Comstock, former U.S. representative for Virginia's 10th congressional district
- Nick Freitas, state delegate for Virginia's 30th House of Delegates district, candidate for the U.S. Senate in 2018 and nominee for Virginia's 7th congressional district in 2020
- Emmett Hanger, state senator for Virginia's 24th Senate district
- Bill Stanley, state senator for Virginia's 20th Senate district
- Corey Stewart, attorney, former chairman of the Prince William Board of County Supervisors, nominee for the U.S. Senate in 2018 and candidate for governor of Virginia in 2017 (endorsed Youngkin)

=== Endorsements ===
Amanda Chase

Executive branch officials

- Michael Flynn, former National Security advisor
Kirk Cox

U.S. senators

- George Allen, former U.S. senator from Virginia (2001–2007) and 67th governor of Virginia (1994–1998)

Governors

- Bob McDonnell, former governor of Virginia (2010–2014)

U.S. representatives

- Tom Davis, former U.S. representative for Virginia's 11th congressional district
- Morgan Griffith, U.S. representative for Virginia's 9th congressional district

State delegates

- Carrie Coyner (Chesterfield)
- Roxann Robinson (Chesterfield)

State senators

- Charles William Carrico Sr. (former Grayson)
- Jeannemarie Devolites Davis (former Fairfax)
- Bill Stanley (Moneta)

Individuals

- Elliott Sadler and Hermie Sadler, NASCAR drivers
Pete Snyder

Executive branch officials

- Sarah Sanders, 31st White House press secretary (2017–2019)

U.S. representatives

- Bob Good, U.S. representative for Virginia's 5th congressional district

State delegates

- Dave LaRock (Hamilton)

State senators

- Dick Black, former senator from Ashburn

Individuals

- Ken Cuccinelli, former attorney general of Virginia
- Thomas Homan, former acting director of the U.S. Immigration and Customs Enforcement
- Tony Pham, former acting director of the U.S. Immigration and Customs Enforcement
Glenn Youngkin

U.S. senators

- Ted Cruz, U.S. senator from Texas

Governors

- Kevin Stitt, governor of Oklahoma

State senators

- Stephen Newman (Forest), former president pro tempore of the Senate of Virginia, former state delegate

State delegates

- John McGuire (Glen Allen)

=== Polling ===
==== Primary polling ====
Poll source	Date(s) administered	Sample size	Margin of error	Amanda Chase	Kirk Cox	Sergio de la Peña	Peter Doran	Octavia Johnson	Pete Snyder	Glenn Youngkin	Other	Undecided
Change Research (D)	May 5–6, 2021	605 (LV)	± 4.4%	29%	7%	2%	0%	1%	13%	25%	–	25%
Public Policy Polling (D) (Note: This poll was sponsored by the Democratic Governors Association)	April 2021	695 (LV)	± 3.7%	22%	7%	3%	1%	0%	16%	21%	–	30%
Christopher Newport University	January 31 – February 14, 2021	370 (RV)	± 5.6%	17%	10%	–	–	–	–	3%	–	55%
YouGov Blue (D)	February 6–11, 2021	170 (RV)	± 8.6%	24%	7%	1%	–	–	13%	5%	0%	54%

==== Convention polling ====
Poll source	Date(s) administered	Sample size	Margin of error	Amanda Chase	Kirk Cox	Pete Snyder	Glenn Youngkin	Other	Undecided
The Trafalgar Group (R) (Note: This poll was sponsored by Youngkin's campaign)	April 29 – May 3, 2021	3,896 (LV)	± 1.6%	10%	10%	26%	38%	13%	3%

Final results by county and independent city: Youngkin: 50–60%; 60–70%; 70–80%; 80–90%; Tie: 50%; Snyder: 50–60%; 60–70%; 70–80%; 90–100%

=== Results ===
Round-by-round result visualization of the Ranked Choice Voting election

Virginia GOP Convention, governor nominee
Candidate	Round 1		Round 2		Round 3		Round 4		Round 5		Round 6	
Candidate	Votes	%	Votes	%	Votes	%	Votes	%	Votes	%	Votes	%
Glenn Youngkin	4131.80	32.9%	4140.55	33.0%	4148.91	33.0%	4331.93	34.5%	5311.43	42.3%	6869.22	54.7%
Pete Snyder	3241.61	25.8%	3243.84	25.8%	3249.71	25.9%	3502.91	27.9%	4078.25	32.5%	5684.78	45.3%
Amanda Chase	2605.89	20.8%	2611.54	20.8%	2619.83	20.9%	2859.39	22.8%	3164.32	25.2%	Eliminated	
Kirk Cox	1693.58	13.5%	1698.13	13.5%	1705.90	13.6%	1859.77	14.8%	Eliminated			
Sergio de la Peña	805.35	6.4%	812.44	6.5%	829.65	6.6%	Eliminated					
Peter Doran	42.28	0.3%	47.50	0.4%	Eliminated							
Octavia Johnson	33.48	0.3%	Eliminated									

== Other parties and independents ==
=== Candidates ===
==== Declared ====
- Princess Blanding (Liberation Party), teacher, former school administrator, activist, and sister of Marcus-David Peters

==== Did not qualify ====
- Frankie Bowers (Independent)
- Brad Froman (Independent), business owner
- Timothy Phipps (Constitution Party)

==== Declined ====
- Amanda Chase, state senator for Virginia's 11th Senate district
- Denver Riggleman, former U.S. representative (VA-05)

== General election ==
On August 26, the Republican Party of Virginia filed a lawsuit to disqualify McAuliffe from appearing on the ballot in November. The suit alleged that McAuliffe did not sign his declaration of candidacy, which is needed to qualify in the primary and general election. It was found that the declaration of candidacy was missing his signature, although it included two witnesses' signatures. The suit also alleged the witnesses violated state law by witnessing a signing that did not occur.

=== Debates ===
==== Canceled debates ====
On July 12, Glenn Youngkin announced he would not take part in the July 24 debate hosted by the Virginia Bar Association because of a donation made by one of the moderators, Judy Woodruff. Woodruff had made a $250 donation to the Clinton Foundation relief fund after the 2010 Haiti earthquake. The foundation had been run by Hillary and Bill Clinton, who were close allies to Terry McAuliffe. On July 28, after discovering that Youngkin would participate in an "election integrity" rally at Liberty University, McAuliffe declined a debate at the same university. On August 2, Youngkin declined participation in the People's Debate. The two candidates pledged to two debates: one on September 16 and one on September 28.

==== First debate ====
Youngkin and McAuliffe met at Appalachian School of Law in Grundy, Virginia on September 16, 2021, one day before early voting began. The debate was hosted by USA Today Washington Bureau Chief, Susan Page.

The debate started with discussion over a recent COVID-19 mandate President Joe Biden signed requiring federal workers, employees of large companies, and contractors to be vaccinated. Youngkin doubted if Biden had the power to authorize the mandate, and supported personal choice for receiving the vaccine. McAuliffe supported the mandate and accused Youngkin of spreading "anti-vax" rhetoric. Youngkin denied the claim. McAuliffe also supported requiring vaccines for students over the age of 12. McAuliffe had also repeatedly made false statements about COVID-19, often inflating the number of cases.

About climate change, Youngkin stated he would use all sources of energy to address climate change without "putting [the] entire energy grid at risk for political purposes." McAuliffe called for clean energy in the state by 2035, and stressed the idea for the state to be a production hub.

The discussion then moved to abortion, specifically the recent Texas Heartbeat Act signed by Texas governor Greg Abbott (who endorsed Youngkin). When asked whether he would sign a similar bill, Youngkin stated that he would not sign the bill, was anti-abortion, and supported exclusions in cases such as rape, incest, and when the life of the mother is endangered. He said he supported a "pain-threshold" bill that would ban most abortions at the point when a fetus can feel pain, which proponents of this type of law define as 20 weeks. Youngkin called McAuliffe "the most extreme pro-abortion candidate in America today". In response, McAuliffe stated he was a "brick wall" on women's rights, would protect a woman's decision over abortion, and supported reducing the number of doctors needed to certify a third-trimester abortion from three to one.

After supporting an "Election Integrity Taskforce", Youngkin said he did not believe there had been "significant fraud", and called the issue of fraud "a democracy issue". He stressed that he believes that "Joe Biden's our president", and criticized the withdrawal from Afghanistan. McAuliffe took note of Donald Trump's endorsement of Youngkin, calling him a "Trump wannabe". Both candidates stated they would concede the election if the other came out on top.

The final discussion topic was over the economy. McAuliffe attacked Youngkin on his top economic advisor, Stephen Moore, who advised Donald Trump's 2016 presidential campaign. Youngkin defended Virginia's right-to-work law.

==== Second debate ====
Youngkin and McAuliffe met at the Northern Virginia Chamber of Commerce on September 28, 2021. The event was hosted by Chuck Todd, moderator of NBC's Meet the Press. Less than a week before the debate, one of the panelists, Michael Fauntroy, withdrew from the debate after tweets against the GOP and Evangelicals were found.

On the topic of COVID-19, Youngkin and McAuliffe reiterated their stances on the vaccines. Youngkin stated he believed in mandates for vaccines for measles, mumps and rubella, but not for COVID-19, saying that "the data associated with those vaccines is something that we should absolutely understand the difference between this vaccine." Youngkin said people should get vaccinated against COVID-19.

During the debate, Youngkin noted that Trump was regularly mentioned by McAuliffe, who again called Youngkin a "Trump wannabe." When asked, Youngkin stated he would support Trump if he were to become the Republican nominee in 2024.

Approximately 15 minutes into the debate, third party candidate Princess Blanding, who was in the audience, disrupted the debate, screaming that her exclusion from the debate was "unfair" and claiming that McAuliffe would not win the election. After being escorted out by security, she claimed that being excluded from the debate was racist and sexist, and that it constituted "censorship".

Youngkin asserted that McAuliffe had vetoed legislation that would have required schools to inform parents about sexually explicit content in educational materials. McAuliffe defended his veto, saying: "'I'm not going to let parents come into schools and actually take books out and make their own decision... I don't think parents should be telling schools what they should teach'". McAuliffe received criticism for these remarks, and Youngkin used his comments to create an attack ad. Following the election, Newsweek described McAuliffe's remarks as "a major factor in the race".

=== Predictions ===
Source	Ranking	As of
The Cook Political Report	Tossup	October 5, 2021
Inside Elections	Tossup	November 1, 2021
Sabato's Crystal Ball	Lean R (flip)	November 1, 2021

=== Endorsements ===
Terry McAuliffe (D)

Federal officials

- Joe Biden, 46th president of the United States (2021–2025), 47th vice president of the United States (2009–2017), and former U.S. senator from Delaware (1973–2009)
- Bill Clinton, 42nd president of the United States (1993–2001) and 40th and 42nd governor of Arkansas (1979–1981, 1983–1992)
- Hillary Clinton, 2016 Democratic nominee for president of the United States, 67th U.S. secretary of state (2009–2013), candidate for President in 2008, U.S. senator from New York (2001–2009), First Lady of the United States (1993–2001)
- Kamala Harris, 49th vice president of the United States (2021–2025), and former U.S. senator from California (2017–2021)
- Barack Obama, 44th president of the United States (2009–2017), former U.S. senator for Illinois (2005–2008), former Illinois state senator (1997–2004)

Governors

- Gavin Newsom, governor of California (2019–present)
- Ralph Northam, governor of Virginia (2018–2022)

U.S. senators

- Cory Booker, U.S. senator from New Jersey (2013–present), 38th Mayor of Newark (2006–2013)
- Tim Kaine, 2016 Democratic nominee for vice president of the United States, U.S. senator from Virginia (2013–present), 70th governor of Virginia (2006–2010), 38th lieutenant governor of Virginia (2002–2006), 78th mayor of Richmond (1998–2001)
- Amy Klobuchar, U.S. senator from Minnesota (2007–present)
- Jon Ossoff, U.S. senator from Georgia (2021–present)
- Alex Padilla, U.S. senator from California (2021–present), 30th Secretary of State of California (2015–2021)
- Mark Warner, U.S. senator from Virginia (2009–present), and 69th governor of Virginia (2002–2006)
- Elizabeth Warren, U.S. senator from Massachusetts (2013–present)

U.S. representatives

- Don Beyer, U.S. representative for Virginia's 8th congressional district (2015–present) and 36th lieutenant governor of Virginia (1990–1998)
- Rick Boucher, former U.S. representative for Virginia's 9th congressional district (1983–2011)
- Jim Clyburn, U.S. representative for South Carolina's 6th congressional district (1993–present) and House majority whip (2007–2011, 2019–2023)
- Elaine Luria, U.S. representative for Virginia's 2nd congressional district (2019–2023)
- Donald McEachin, U.S. representative for Virginia's 4th congressional district (2017–2022)
- Jim Moran, former U.S. representative for Virginia's 8th congressional district (1991–2015) and former mayor of Alexandria (1985–1991)
- Nancy Pelosi, speaker of the House, (2007–2011, 2019–2023) U.S. representative for California's 12th congressional district (1987–present)
- Bobby Scott, U.S. representative for Virginia's 3rd congressional district (1993–present)
- Abigail Spanberger, U.S. representative for Virginia's 7th congressional district (2019–2025)
- Jennifer Wexton, U.S. representative for Virginia's 10th congressional district (2019–2025)

State legislators

- Stacey Abrams, former minority leader of the Georgia House of Representatives (2011–2017), former Georgia state representative (2007–2017) and founder of Fair Fight Action
- Lamont Bagby, state delegate from the 74th district (2015–present)
- John Bell, state senator from the 13th district (2020–present) and former state delegate from the 87th district (2016–2020)
- Jennifer Boysko, state senator from the 33rd district (2019–present)
- Richard Cranwell, former majority leader of the Virginia House of Delegates (1991–2000), former minority leader of the Virginia House of Delegates (2000–2002), and former chair of the Democratic Party of Virginia (2005–2010)
- Karrie Delaney, state delegate from the 67th district (2018–present)
- Barbara Favola, state senator from the 31st district (2012–present)
- Eileen Filler-Corn, state delegate from the 41st district (2010–present) and speaker of the Virginia House of Delegates (2020–present)
- Jennifer Carroll Foy, former state delegate from the 2nd district (2018–2020) and candidate for governor in 2021
- Charniele Herring, state delegate from the 46th district (2009–present), majority leader of the Virginia House of Delegates (2020–present), and former chair of the Democratic Party of Virginia (2012–2014)
- Janet Howell, state senator from the 32nd district (1992–present)
- Chris Hurst, state delegate from the 12th district (2018–present)
- Jay Jones, state delegate from the 89th district (2018–2021)
- Louise Lucas, state senator from the 18th district (1992–present) and president pro tempore of the Senate of Virginia (2020–present)
- Delores McQuinn, state delegate from the 70th district (2009–present)
- Martha Mugler, state delegate from the 91st district (2020–present)
- Kathleen Murphy, state delegate from the 34th district (2015–present)
- David Ramadan, former state delegate from the 87th district (2012–2016) (Republican)
- Sam Rasoul, state delegate from the 48th district (2014–present)
- David A. Reid, state delegate from the 32nd district (2018–present)
- Dick Saslaw, state senator from the 35th district (1980–2024), majority leader of the Senate of Virginia (2020–2024), and former state delegate from the 19th district (1976–1980)
- Shelly Simonds, state delegate from the 94th district (2020–present)
- Suhas Subramanyam, state delegate from the 87th district (2020–present)
- Rip Sullivan, state delegate from the 48th district (2014–present)
- Luke Torian, state delegate from the 52nd district (2010–present)
- David Toscano, former minority leader of the Virginia House of Delegates (2011–2018) and former mayor of Charlottesville (1994–1996)
- Roslyn Tyler, state delegate from the 75th district (2006–present)
- Schuyler VanValkenburg, state delegate from the 72nd district (2018–present)
- Vivian Watts, state delegate from the 39th district (1996–present) and former Virginia secretary of transportation and public safety (1986–1990)
- Rodney Willett, state delegate from the 73rd district (2020–present)

Local officials

- Kenny Alexander, mayor of Norfolk (2016–present)
- Keisha Lance Bottoms, mayor of Atlanta (2018–2022)
- Sharon Bulova, former chair of the Fairfax County Fairfax County Board of Supervisors (2009–2019)
- John Foust, member of the Fairfax County Fairfax County Board of Supervisors (2007–present)
- Penelope Gross, member of the Fairfax County Fairfax County Board of Supervisors (1996–present)
- Jeff McKay, chair of the Fairfax County Fairfax County Board of Supervisors (2019–present)
- Levar Stoney, mayor of Richmond (2017–2025) and former secretary of the commonwealth of Virginia (2014–2016)

Labor unions

- AFSCME
- American Federation of Teachers
- Communications Workers of America
- NATCA
- Virginia AFL–CIO

Organizations

- Human Rights Campaign
- Moms Demand Action
- Natural Resources Defense Council Action Fund
- VoteVets

Newspapers

- The Washington Post

Individuals

- Jill Biden, First Lady of the United States (2021–2025)
- Doug Emhoff, Second Gentleman of the United States (2021–2025)
- Blake Cooper Griffin, actor
- Jaime Harrison, chair of the Democratic National Committee (2021–2025)
- Dolores Huerta, civil rights activist
- Bill Kristol, neoconservative political commentator (former Republican)
- Dave Matthews, singer and songwriter
- Mary L. Trump, psychologist and niece of Donald Trump
- Pharrell Williams, singer and songwriter
Glenn Youngkin (R)

Executive branch officials

- Steve Bannon, White House chief strategist and senior counselor to the president (2017)
- George W. Bush, 43rd president of the United States (2001–2009), 46th governor of Texas (1995–2000)
- Ken Cuccinelli, principal deputy director of United States Citizenship and Immigration Services (2019–2021), attorney general of Virginia (2010–2014), nominee for governor of Virginia in 2013
- Nikki Haley, U.S. ambassador to the United Nations (2017–2018) and former governor of South Carolina (2011–2017)
- Mike Pence, 48th vice president of the United States (2017–2021)
- Mike Pompeo, secretary of state (2018–2021), director of the CIA (2017–2018), and U.S. representative from Kansas's 4th congressional district (2011–2017)
- Donald Trump, 45th president of the United States (2017–2021)

U.S. senators

- Ted Cruz, U.S. senator from Texas (2013–present)
- Rand Paul, U.S. senator from Kentucky (2011–present)
- Mitt Romney, U.S. senator from Utah (2019–2025), 2012 Republican nominee for president of the United States, 70th governor of Massachusetts (2003–2007)
- Rick Scott, U.S. senator from Florida (2019–present), 45th governor of Florida (2011–2019)
- Tim Scott, U.S. senator from South Carolina (2013–present)

Governors

- Greg Abbott, governor of Texas (2015–present)
- George Allen, 67th governor of Virginia (1994–1998) and United States senator (2001–2007)
- Doug Burgum, governor of North Dakota (2016–2025)
- Bob Ehrlich, 60th governor of Maryland (2003–2007), and former U.S. representative for Maryland's 2nd congressional district (1995–2003)
- Jim Gilmore, 68th governor of Virginia (1998–2002), and 38th attorney general of Virginia (1994–1997)
- Larry Hogan, governor of Maryland (2015–2023)
- Bill Lee, governor of Tennessee (2019–present)
- Brad Little, governor of Idaho (2019–present)
- Bob McDonnell, 71st governor of Virginia (2010–2014) and 44th attorney general of Virginia (2006–2009)
- Kevin Stitt, governor of Oklahoma (2019–present)

U.S. representatives

- Ben Cline, U.S. representative for Virginia's 6th congressional district (2019–present)
- Barbara Comstock, former U.S. representative for Virginia's 10th congressional district (2015–2019)
- Newt Gingrich, former U.S. representative for Georgia's 6th congressional district (1979–1999), 50th speaker of the United States House of Representatives (1995–1999), and candidate for president of the United States in 2012
- Bob Good, U.S. representative for Virginia's 5th congressional district (2021–2025)
- Bob Goodlatte, former U.S. representative for Virginia's 6th congressional district (1993–2019)
- Morgan Griffith, U.S. representative for Virginia's 9th congressional district (2011–present)

State legislators

- Rich Anderson, former state delegate from the 51st district (2010–2018) and chair of the Republican Party of Virginia (2020–present)
- Kathy Byron, state delegate from the 22nd district (1998–present)
- Amanda Chase, state senator for the 11th district (2016–2024) and candidate for governor in 2021
- Kirk Cox, state delegate from the 66th district (1990–present) and former speaker of the Virginia House of Delegates (2018–2020)
- Nick Freitas, state delegate from the 30th district (2016–present)
- Todd Gilbert, minority leader of the Virginia House of Delegates (2020–2021), speaker of the Virginia House of Delegates (2022–present) and state delegate from the 15th district (2012–present)
- Chris Head, state delegate from the 17th district (2012–present)
- Jen Kiggans, state senator from the 7th district (2020–2023)
- Terry Kilgore, state delegate from the 1st district (1994–present)
- John McGuire, state delegate from the 56th district (2018–2025)
- Joe McNamara, state delegate from the 8th district (2018–present)
- Stephen Newman, state senator from the 23rd district (1996–present), former president pro tempore of the Senate of Virginia (2016–2020), and former state delegate from the 23rd district (1992–1996)
- Mark Obenshain, state senator from the 26th district (2004–present) and nominee for attorney general of Virginia in 2013
- Mark Peake, state senator from the 22nd district (2017–present)
- Richard Stuart, state senator from the 28th district (2008–present)
- David Suetterlein, state delegate from the 19th district (2016–present)
- Wendell Walker, state delegate from the 23rd district (2020–present)
- Michael Webert, state delegate from the 18th district (2012–present)
- Bill Wiley, state delegate from the 29th district (2020–present)

Local officials

- Michael L. Chapman, sheriff of Loudoun County, Virginia (2012–present)
- Ken Stolle, sheriff of Virginia Beach (2010–present)

Organizations

- Americans for Prosperity
- Family Research Council
- Log Cabin Republicans
- National Right to Life
- Republican Party of Virginia
- Susan B. Anthony List
- Virginia Society for Human Life
- Women Speak Out Virginia

Individuals

- Daniel Gade, activist and Republican nominee for the U.S. Senate in 2020
- Hugh Hewitt, radio talk show host
- Ronna McDaniel, chair of the Republican National Committee (2017–2024)
- Tony Perkins, former member of the Louisiana House of Representatives from the 64th district, president of Family Research Council
Princess Blanding (L)

State legislators

- Lee J. Carter, state delegate from the 50th district (2018–2022) and gubernatorial primary candidate (Democratic) (Note: Carter registered as an Independent in 2022, but was a Democrat when making the endorsement.)

=== Polling ===
Aggregate polls

Source of poll aggregation	Dates administered	Dates updated	Terry McAuliffe (D)	Glenn Youngkin (R)	Other/Undecided (Note: Calculated by taking the difference of 100% and all other candidates combined.)	Margin
Real Clear Politics	October 20–31, 2021	November 1, 2021	46.8%	48.5%	4.8%	Youngkin +1.7%
FiveThirtyEight	August 1 – November 1, 2021	November 1, 2021	47.0%	47.9%	5.1%	Youngkin +1.0%
Average			46.9%	48.2%	5.0%	Youngkin +1.4%

Poll source	Date(s) administered	Sample size	Margin of error	Terry McAuliffe (D)	Glenn Youngkin (R)	Other	Undecided
Research Co.	October 31 – November 1, 2021	450 (LV)	± 4.6%	47%	48%	2% (Note: Blanding with 2%)	3%
Targoz Market Research	October 26 – November 1, 2021	747 (LV)	± 3.6%	50%	47%	–	3%
The Trafalgar Group (R)	October 29–31, 2021	1,081 (LV)	± 3.0%	47%	49%	2%	2%
InsiderAdvantage (R) (Note: This poll was sponsored by WTTG)	October 27–30, 2021	500 (LV)	± 4.4%	45%	47%	2%	6%
Echelon Insights	October 27–29, 2021	611 (LV)	± 4.0%	46%	49%	2%	4%
Roanoke College	October 14–28, 2021	571 (LV)	± 4.7%	48%	47%	1% (Note: Blanding with 1%)	4%
Fox News	October 24–27, 2021	1,212 (RV)	± 2.5%	47%	48%	2%	3%
Fox News	October 24–27, 2021	1,015 (LV)	± 3.0%	45%	53%	1%	1%
The Washington Post/Schar School	October 20–26, 2021	1,107 (RV)	± 3.5%	47%	44%	5% (Note: Blanding with 3%; "Would not vote" and "None of these" with 1%)	3%
The Washington Post/Schar School	October 20–26, 2021	1,107 (RV)	± 3.5%	49%	45%	3% (Note: "Neither" with 2%; "Would not vote" with 1%)	4%
The Washington Post/Schar School	October 20–26, 2021	918 (LV)	± 4.0%	49%	48%	1% (Note: Blanding with 1%; "Would not vote" and "None of these" with 0%)	2%
The Washington Post/Schar School	October 20–26, 2021	918 (LV)	± 4.0%	49%	48%	0% (Note: "Would not vote" and "Neither" with 0%)	2%
Christopher Newport University	October 17–25, 2021	944 (LV)	± 3.5%	49%	48%	1%	1%
Suffolk University	October 21–24, 2021	500 (LV)	± 4.4%	46%	45%	2%	7%
Emerson College	October 22–23, 2021	875 (LV)	± 3.2%	48%	48%	1%	3%
co/efficient (R) (Note: This poll was sponsored by Winsome Sears's campaign for Lieutenant Governor)	October 20–21, 2021	785 (LV)	± 3.5%	43%	47%	5% (Note: Blanding with 5%)	5%
Cygnal (R)	October 19–21, 2021	816 (LV)	± 3.4%	48%	48%	1%	3%
KAConsulting LLC (R) (Note: This poll was sponsored by the Presidential Coalition)	October 18–21, 2021	661 (LV)	± 3.8%	41%	43%	1%	15%
Virginia Commonwealth University	October 9–21, 2021	722 (LV)	± 6.4%	41%	38%	10%	11%
Monmouth University	October 16–19, 2021	1,005 (RV)	± 3.1%	46%	46%	2%	7%
Monmouth University	October 16–19, 2021	1,005 (LV) (Note: Weighted toward more low-propensity voters)	± 3.1%	45%	48%	–	–
Monmouth University	October 16–19, 2021	1,005 (LV) (Note: Weighted toward fewer low-propensity voters)	± 3.1%	48%	45%	–	–
Data for Progress (D)	October 4–15, 2021	1,589 (LV)	± 2.0%	50%	45%	2%	3%
The Trafalgar Group (R)	October 11–13, 2021	1,095 (LV)	± 3.0%	48%	48%	1%	3%
Fox News	October 10–13, 2021	1,004 (RV)	± 3.0%	52%	41%	2%	5%
Fox News	October 10–13, 2021	726 (LV)	± 3.5%	51%	46%	1%	2%
Schoen Cooperman Research (D)	October 9–12, 2021	500 (LV)	± 4.4%	47%	43%	0%	10%
YouGov/CBS News	October 4–11, 2021	1,040 (LV)	± 4.1%	50%	47%	2%	0%
Christopher Newport University	September 27 – October 6, 2021	802 (LV)	± 4.2%	49%	45%	1%	5%
Emerson College	October 1–3, 2021	620 (LV)	± 3.9%	49%	48%	1%	2%
Fox News	September 26–29, 2021	901 (RV)	± 3.0%	48%	44%	1%	7%
Roanoke College	September 12–26, 2021	603 (LV)	± 4.6%	48%	41%	2% (Note: Blanding with 1%; Other with 1%)	9%
Monmouth University	September 22–26, 2021	801 (RV)	± 3.5%	48%	43%	2%	8%
Monmouth University	September 22–26, 2021	801 (LV)	± 3.5%	48%	45%	–	–
Monmouth University	September 22–26, 2021	801 (LV)	± 3.5%	50%	43%	–	–
Global Strategy Group (D) (Note: This poll was sponsored by Power for Tomorrow)	September 16–20, 2021	600 (LV)	± 4.0%	48%	45%	–	7%
KAConsulting LLC (R)	September 17–19, 2021	700 (LV)	± 3.7%	46%	42%	1%	10%
Public Policy Polling (D) (Note: This poll was sponsored by Protect Our Care)	September 17–18, 2021	875 (V)	± 3.3%	45%	42%	–	13%
Virginia Commonwealth University	September 7–15, 2021	731 (LV)	± 6.9%	43%	34%	10%	13%
Emerson College	September 13–14, 2021	778 (LV)	± 3.4%	49%	45%	2%	5%
University of Mary Washington	September 7–13, 2021	1,000 (A)	± 3.1%	43%	38%	8% (Note: Blanding with 2%; "None/Would not vote" with 5%; "other/write-in" with 1%)	11%
University of Mary Washington	September 7–13, 2021	885 (RV)	± 3.3%	46%	41%	2%	–
University of Mary Washington	September 7–13, 2021	528 (LV)	± 4.1%	43%	48%	4% (Note: Blanding with 2%; "None/Would not vote" and "other/write-in" with 1%)	6%
The Washington Post/Schar School	September 7–13, 2021	907 (RV)	± 4.0%	49%	43%	3%	4%
The Washington Post/Schar School	September 7–13, 2021	728 (LV)	± 4.5%	50%	47%	1%	2%
WPA Intelligence (R) (Note: This poll was sponsored by Youngkin's campaign)	August 30 – September 2, 2021	734 (LV)	± 3.6%	46%	48%	3% (Note: Blanding with 3%)	4%
WPA Intelligence (R)	August 30 – September 2, 2021	734 (LV)	± 3.6%	48%	48%	–	4%
The Trafalgar Group (R)	August 26–29, 2021	1,074 (LV)	± 3.0%	47%	46%	2%	5%
Monmouth University	August 24–29, 2021	802 (RV)	± 3.5%	47%	42%	2%	9%
Monmouth University	August 24–29, 2021	802 (LV)	± 3.5%	47%	45%	–	–
Monmouth University	August 24–29, 2021	802 (LV)	± 3.5%	49%	42%	–	–
Christopher Newport University	August 15–23, 2021	800 (LV)	± 3.6%	50%	41%	3%	6%
Global Strategy Group (D) (Note: This poll was sponsored by the Virginia League of Conservation Voters)	August 12–23, 2021	802 (LV)	± 3.5%	48%	43%	–	9%
Change Research (D) (Note: This poll was sponsored by Crooked Media)	August 17–21, 2021	1,653 (LV)	± 3.6%	49%	43%	3%	5%
Change Research (D) (Note: This poll was sponsored by Future Majority)	August 14–18, 2021	1,334 (LV)	± 2.7%	47%	44%	–	9%
Roanoke College	August 3–17, 2021	558 (LV)	± 4.2%	46%	38%	3% (Note: Blanding with 2%; Other with 1%)	13%
Virginia Commonwealth University	August 4–15, 2021	770 (RV)	± 5.4%	40%	37%	15%	9%
Virginia Commonwealth University	August 4–15, 2021	~747 (LV)	± 5.5%	40%	37%	14%	9%
co/efficient (R)	August 8–9, 2021	1,200 (LV)	± 2.8%	47%	45%	–	8%
WPA Intelligence (R)	August 3–5, 2021	734 (LV)	± 3.6%	50%	43%	3%	4%
WPA Intelligence (R)	August 3–5, 2021	734 (LV)	± 3.6%	51%	45%	–	4%
co/efficient (R) (Note: This poll was sponsored by Conservatives for Clean Energy – VA)	July 25–27, 2021	762 (LV)	± 3.5%	45%	40%	2%	13%
The Trafalgar Group (R)	July 8–10, 2021	1,104 (LV)	± 2.9%	47%	45%	4%	4%
Spry Strategies (R) (Note: This poll was sponsored by the American Principles Project)	July 6–9, 2021	600 (LV)	± 4.0%	46%	41%	2%	10%
JMC Analytics and Polling (R) (Note: This poll was sponsored by CNalysis)	June 9–12, 2021	550 (LV)	± 4.2%	46%	42%	–	12%
WPA Intelligence (R)	June 2–6, 2021	506 (LV)	± 4.4%	48%	46%	–	5%

=== Fundraising ===
Campaign finance reports
Candidate	Amount spent	Votes	Cost per vote
Glenn Youngkin	$64,487,829	1,663,158	$38.77
Terry McAuliffe	$68,777,633	1,599,470	$43.00
Princess Blanding	$32,595	23,107	$1.41
Source: Virginia Public Access Project

== Results ==
Election turnout by county and independent city: 30–40% 40–50% 50–60% 60–70% 70–80%

State Senate district results

State House of Delegates district results

2021 Virginia gubernatorial election
Party	Candidate	Votes	%	±%
Republican	Glenn Youngkin	1,663,158	50.58%	+5.60%
Democratic	Terry McAuliffe	1,599,470	48.64%	−5.25%
Liberation	Princess Blanding	23,107	0.70%	N/A
Write-in		2,592	0.08%	+0.02%
Total votes		3,288,327	100.00%	N/A
Republican gain from Democratic				

=== By county and independent city ===
Locality	Terry McAuliffe Democratic		Glenn Youngkin Republican		Various candidates Other parties		Margin		Total votes cast
Locality	#	%	#	%	#	%	#	%	Total votes cast
Accomack	4,948	38.37%	7,878	61.08%	71	0.55%	2,930	22.72%	12,897
Albemarle	31,919	62.05%	19,141	37.21%	383	0.74%	−12,778	−24.84%	51,443
Alexandria	43,866	75.20%	14,013	24.02%	451	0.77%	−29,853	−51.18%	58,330
Alleghany	1,518	24.97%	4,530	74.52%	31	0.51%	3,012	49.55%	6,079
Amelia	1,617	25.42%	4,720	74.19%	25	0.39%	3,103	48.77%	6,362
Amherst	3,897	28.43%	9,731	71.00%	78	0.57%	5,834	42.57%	13,706
Appomattox	1,438	19.33%	5,971	80.26%	31	0.42%	4,533	60.93%	7,440
Arlington	73,013	76.67%	21,548	22.63%	670	0.70%	−51,465	−54.04%	95,231
Augusta	7,231	21.51%	26,196	77.93%	186	0.55%	18,965	56.42%	33,613
Bath	396	20.34%	1,539	79.04%	12	0.62%	1,143	58.71%	1,947
Bedford	8,001	20.47%	30,912	79.10%	166	0.42%	22,911	58.63%	39,079
Bland	364	13.73%	2,274	85.78%	13	0.49%	1,910	72.05%	2,651
Botetourt	3,990	23.30%	13,066	76.30%	69	0.40%	9,076	53.00%	17,125
Bristol	1,342	26.07%	3,773	73.30%	32	0.62%	2,431	47.23%	5,147
Brunswick	3,165	52.02%	2,880	47.34%	39	0.64%	−285	−4.68%	6,084
Buchanan	903	15.05%	5,083	84.72%	14	0.23%	4,180	69.67%	6,000
Buckingham	2,222	36.11%	3,894	63.29%	37	0.60%	1,672	27.17%	6,153
Buena Vista	481	24.50%	1,459	74.33%	23	1.17%	978	49.82%	1,963
Campbell	4,930	21.22%	18,213	78.39%	92	0.40%	13,283	57.17%	23,235
Caroline	5,045	41.83%	6,917	57.35%	99	0.82%	1,872	15.52%	12,061
Carroll	1,910	16.15%	9,868	83.45%	47	0.40%	7,958	67.30%	11,825
Charles City	1,822	53.79%	1,550	45.76%	15	0.44%	−272	−8.03%	3,387
Charlotte	1,396	29.24%	3,354	70.26%	24	0.50%	1,958	41.01%	4,774
Charlottesville	14,378	82.88%	2,774	15.99%	195	1.12%	−11,604	−66.89%	17,347
Chesapeake	42,907	46.79%	48,079	52.43%	713	0.78%	5,172	5.64%	91,699
Chesterfield	74,085	47.41%	80,889	51.76%	1,303	0.83%	6,804	4.35%	156,277
Clarke	2,739	36.90%	4,642	62.54%	41	0.55%	1,903	25.64%	7,422
Colonial Heights	1,729	25.79%	4,913	73.27%	63	0.94%	3,184	47.49%	6,705
Covington	579	32.29%	1,198	66.82%	16	0.89%	619	34.52%	1,793
Craig	400	16.00%	2,079	83.16%	21	0.84%	1,679	67.16%	2,500
Culpeper	6,661	32.95%	13,436	66.47%	117	0.58%	6,775	33.52%	20,214
Cumberland	1,515	35.86%	2,678	63.38%	32	0.76%	1,163	27.53%	4,225
Danville	6,872	53.42%	5,907	45.92%	85	0.66%	−965	−7.50%	12,864
Dickenson	934	19.40%	3,867	80.31%	14	0.29%	2,933	60.91%	4,815
Dinwiddie	4,181	36.10%	7,335	63.33%	66	0.57%	3,154	27.23%	11,582
Emporia	1,087	59.33%	723	39.47%	22	1.20%	−364	−19.87%	1,832
Essex	1,980	42.05%	2,684	57.00%	45	0.96%	704	14.95%	4,709
Fairfax City	6,465	63.74%	3,606	35.56%	71	0.70%	−2,859	−28.19%	10,142
Fairfax County	286,316	64.89%	152,110	34.47%	2,840	0.64%	−134,206	−30.41%	441,266
Falls Church	5,388	76.69%	1,590	22.63%	48	0.68%	−3,798	−54.06%	7,026
Fauquier	11,570	34.04%	22,252	65.46%	170	0.50%	10,682	31.43%	33,992
Floyd	2,203	29.38%	5,230	69.75%	65	0.87%	3,027	40.37%	7,498
Fluvanna	5,312	42.65%	7,068	56.75%	74	0.59%	1,756	14.10%	12,454
Franklin City	1,680	56.66%	1,270	42.83%	15	0.51%	−410	−13.83%	2,965
Franklin County	5,894	24.71%	17,842	74.82%	112	0.47%	11,948	50.10%	23,848
Frederick	11,164	30.69%	25,063	68.90%	149	0.41%	13,899	38.21%	36,376
Fredericksburg	5,402	59.79%	3,503	38.77%	130	1.44%	−1,899	−21.02%	9,035
Galax	492	25.55%	1,424	73.94%	10	0.52%	932	48.39%	1,926
Giles	1,535	20.77%	5,788	78.33%	66	0.89%	4,253	57.56%	7,389
Gloucester	4,712	27.09%	12,585	72.37%	94	0.54%	7,873	45.27%	17,391
Goochland	4,910	33.74%	9,585	65.87%	57	0.39%	4,675	32.13%	14,552
Grayson	1,062	17.03%	5,144	82.48%	31	0.50%	4,082	65.45%	6,237
Greene	2,806	31.73%	5,961	67.42%	75	0.85%	3,155	35.68%	8,842
Greensville	1,915	52.64%	1,709	46.98%	14	0.38%	−206	−5.66%	3,638
Halifax	4,804	35.53%	8,641	63.90%	77	0.57%	3,837	28.38%	13,522
Hampton	29,971	66.45%	14,651	32.48%	482	1.07%	−15,320	−33.97%	45,104
Hanover	18,107	31.24%	39,515	68.18%	338	0.58%	21,408	36.94%	57,960
Harrisonburg	6,812	60.09%	4,382	38.65%	143	1.26%	−2,430	−21.43%	11,337
Henrico	81,409	58.71%	55,796	40.24%	1,462	1.05%	−25,613	−18.47%	138,667
Henry	5,547	29.93%	12,902	69.61%	87	0.47%	7,355	39.68%	18,536
Highland	325	24.94%	969	74.37%	9	0.69%	644	49.42%	1,303
Hopewell	3,085	49.16%	3,095	49.31%	96	1.53%	10	0.16%	6,276
Isle of Wight	6,565	35.16%	12,000	64.26%	108	0.58%	5,435	29.11%	18,673
James City	18,836	46.98%	21,048	52.50%	207	0.52%	2,212	5.52%	40,091
King and Queen	1,130	34.65%	2,112	64.77%	19	0.58%	982	30.11%	3,261
King George	3,317	31.00%	7,286	68.09%	98	0.92%	3,969	37.09%	10,701
King William	2,247	26.21%	6,286	73.33%	39	0.45%	4,039	47.12%	8,572
Lancaster	2,406	40.97%	3,448	58.71%	19	0.32%	1,042	17.74%	5,873
Lee	882	12.13%	6,372	87.60%	20	0.27%	5,490	75.47%	7,274
Lexington	1,289	62.03%	775	37.30%	14	0.67%	−514	−24.74%	2,078
Loudoun	89,390	55.25%	71,467	44.17%	937	0.58%	−17,923	−11.08%	161,794
Louisa	5,896	33.43%	11,649	66.04%	94	0.53%	5,753	32.62%	17,639
Lunenburg	1,567	34.09%	3,019	65.67%	11	0.24%	1,452	31.59%	4,597
Lynchburg	11,000	44.17%	13,668	54.89%	233	0.94%	2,668	10.71%	24,901
Madison	1,973	29.33%	4,721	70.17%	34	0.51%	2,748	40.84%	6,728
Manassas	6,155	54.44%	5,050	44.67%	101	0.89%	−1,105	−9.77%	11,306
Manassas Park	2,158	59.99%	1,379	38.34%	60	1.67%	−779	−21.66%	3,597
Martinsville	2,224	56.38%	1,676	42.48%	45	1.14%	−548	−13.89%	3,945
Mathews	1,363	27.92%	3,493	71.56%	25	0.51%	2,130	43.64%	4,881
Mecklenburg	4,075	33.85%	7,922	65.81%	40	0.33%	3,847	31.96%	12,037
Middlesex	1,860	33.14%	3,703	65.97%	50	0.89%	1,843	32.83%	5,613
Montgomery	15,355	46.82%	17,041	51.96%	399	1.22%	1,686	5.14%	32,795
Nelson	3,346	43.57%	4,259	55.46%	75	0.98%	913	11.89%	7,680
New Kent	3,439	28.50%	8,569	71.02%	58	0.48%	5,130	42.52%	12,066
Newport News	32,399	59.69%	21,241	39.14%	636	1.17%	−11,158	−20.56%	54,276
Norfolk	40,324	67.14%	18,888	31.45%	849	1.41%	−21,436	−35.69%	60,061
Northampton	2,584	49.09%	2,650	50.34%	30	0.57%	66	1.25%	5,264
Northumberland	2,312	35.48%	4,167	63.95%	37	0.57%	1,855	28.47%	6,516
Norton	320	26.60%	866	71.99%	17	1.41%	546	45.39%	1,203
Nottoway	1,892	34.93%	3,497	64.57%	27	0.50%	1,605	29.63%	5,416
Orange	5,351	33.22%	10,670	66.23%	89	0.55%	5,319	33.02%	16,110
Page	1,995	20.73%	7,594	78.92%	33	0.34%	5,599	58.19%	9,622
Patrick	1,255	17.34%	5,946	82.14%	38	0.52%	4,691	64.80%	7,239
Petersburg	7,591	84.87%	1,207	13.50%	146	1.63%	−6,384	−71.38%	8,944
Pittsylvania	6,319	24.35%	19,543	75.31%	88	0.34%	13,224	50.96%	25,950
Poquoson	1,364	21.66%	4,897	77.75%	37	0.59%	3,533	56.10%	6,298
Portsmouth	19,513	65.41%	9,946	33.34%	374	1.25%	−9,567	−32.07%	29,833
Powhatan	3,721	22.73%	12,582	76.86%	68	0.42%	8,861	54.13%	16,371
Prince Edward	3,210	45.05%	3,876	54.40%	39	0.55%	666	9.35%	7,125
Prince George	4,577	34.62%	8,548	64.65%	97	0.73%	3,971	30.03%	13,222
Prince William	87,352	57.01%	64,658	42.20%	1,208	0.79%	−22,694	−14.81%	153,218
Pulaski	3,277	25.20%	9,631	74.06%	97	0.75%	6,354	48.86%	13,005
Radford	1,879	44.80%	2,266	54.03%	49	1.17%	387	9.23%	4,194
Rappahannock	1,686	39.98%	2,507	59.45%	24	0.57%	821	19.47%	4,217
Richmond City	61,929	77.27%	15,713	19.61%	2,500	3.12%	−46,216	−57.67%	80,142
Richmond County	936	29.41%	2,225	69.90%	22	0.69%	1,289	40.50%	3,183
Roanoke City	16,817	57.70%	12,024	41.25%	306	1.05%	−4,793	−16.44%	29,147
Roanoke County	14,445	33.70%	28,157	65.70%	257	0.60%	13,712	31.99%	42,859
Rockbridge	3,071	30.64%	6,906	68.89%	47	0.47%	3,835	38.26%	10,024
Rockingham	8,569	24.11%	26,765	75.31%	205	0.58%	18,196	51.20%	35,539
Russell	1,452	14.97%	8,229	84.83%	20	0.21%	6,777	69.86%	9,701
Salem	3,344	34.99%	6,144	64.29%	68	0.71%	2,800	29.30%	9,556
Scott	1,034	12.72%	7,065	86.89%	32	0.39%	6,031	74.17%	8,131
Shenandoah	4,535	24.72%	13,693	74.64%	118	0.64%	9,158	49.92%	18,346
Smyth	1,751	17.05%	8,477	82.55%	41	0.40%	6,726	65.50%	10,269
Southampton	2,717	34.68%	5,084	64.90%	33	0.42%	2,367	30.21%	7,834
Spotsylvania	21,426	39.47%	32,478	59.84%	375	0.69%	11,052	20.36%	54,279
Stafford	25,463	44.20%	31,680	55.00%	460	0.80%	6,217	10.79%	57,603
Staunton	5,004	51.21%	4,640	47.49%	127	1.30%	−364	−3.73%	9,771
Suffolk	19,079	51.96%	17,351	47.26%	286	0.78%	−1,728	−4.71%	36,716
Surry	1,756	49.66%	1,768	50.00%	12	0.34%	12	0.34%	3,536
Sussex	2,028	50.39%	1,973	49.02%	24	0.60%	−55	−1.37%	4,025
Tazewell	1,821	13.09%	12,045	86.59%	44	0.32%	10,224	73.50%	13,910
Virginia Beach	73,965	45.60%	86,973	53.62%	1,259	0.78%	13,008	8.02%	162,197
Warren	4,328	27.53%	11,294	71.85%	97	0.62%	6,966	44.32%	15,719
Washington	4,505	20.48%	17,395	79.08%	96	0.44%	12,890	58.60%	21,996
Waynesboro	3,275	41.69%	4,473	56.94%	108	1.37%	1,198	15.25%	7,856
Westmoreland	2,971	38.99%	4,614	60.55%	35	0.46%	1,643	21.56%	7,620
Williamsburg	3,185	64.59%	1,703	34.54%	43	0.87%	−1,482	−30.05%	4,931
Winchester	4,294	50.54%	4,137	48.69%	65	0.77%	−157	−1.85%	8,496
Wise	1,796	15.55%	9,691	83.90%	64	0.55%	7,895	68.35%	11,551
Wythe	2,043	17.67%	9,458	81.78%	64	0.55%	7,415	64.12%	11,565
York	12,190	40.85%	17,485	58.59%	166	0.56%	5,295	17.74%	29,841
Totals	1,599,470	48.64%	1,663,158	50.58%	25,699	0.78%	63,688	1.94%	3,288,327

==== Counties and independent cities that flipped from Democratic to Republican ====
- Chesapeake (independent city)
- Chesterfield (no municipalities)
- Hopewell (independent city)
- Montgomery (no municipalities)
- Northampton (no municipalities)
- Prince Edward (no municipalities)
- Radford (independent city)
- Surry (no municipalities)
- Virginia Beach (independent city)

=== By region and precinct ===
Results by region (Note: Regions defined in The Washington Post.)

Results in the Shenandoah Valley

Results in Northern Virginia

Results in Central Virginia

Results in Southwest Virginia

Results in Southside

Results in Hampton Roads

=== By congressional district ===
Youngkin won six of 11 congressional districts, including two that were held by Democratic U.S. representatives at the time. He also flipped Virginia's 2nd congressional district which was previously won by Ralph Northam in 2017.

District	Youngkin	McAuliffe	Blanding	Representative
1st	58.6%	40.7%	0.7%	Rob Wittman
2nd	53.7%	45.5%	0.8%	Elaine Luria
3rd	37.0%	61.9%	1.1%	Bobby Scott
4th	42.6%	55.9%	1.5%	Donald McEachin
5th	59.7%	39.7%	0.6%	Bob Good
6th	66.0%	33.3%	0.7%	Ben Cline
7th	55.0%	44.3%	0.7%	Abigail Spanberger
8th	26.8%	72.5%	0.8%	Don Beyer
9th	74.6%	24.8%	0.8%	Morgan Griffith
10th	47.4%	52.0%	0.6%	Jennifer Wexton
11th	32.6%	66.6%	0.8%	Gerry Connolly

== Analysis ==
Youngkin won the election, 50.6% to 48.6%. The margin of victory was the narrowest margin in a Virginia gubernatorial election since 1989. McAuliffe conceded the day after the election and congratulated Youngkin, saying he was "proud" to campaign "for the values we so deeply believe in". Republicans also flipped the lieutenant governor and attorney general races that were held concurrently, as well as took control of the Virginia House of Delegates. This election, as well as the concurrent elections for lieutenant governor and attorney general, marked the first time since the 1969 gubernatorial election that a Republican won Virginia without Loudoun County, and the first time since the 1960 presidential election that a Republican won statewide without Prince William County. This is the first time Surry County backed the Republican candidate since John Warner's largely uncontested re-election in 2002 and the first time Prince Edward County or Northampton County voted Republican since 2009. This is also the first time any Virginia statewide candidate has won without at least one of the three Northern Virginia counties of Loudoun, Prince William, Fairfax, or the independent cities therein. This was the first gubernatorial election since 1989 in which Democrats failed to flip any counties. Over 3.28 million votes were cast, exceeding the 2017 gubernatorial election total by roughly 625,000 and exceeding all other previous Virginia gubernatorial elections by over a million.

Youngkin's victory is attributed to the "Youngkin coalition" of largely Trump supporters and suburbanites, which contributed to a Republican victory in the state. The appeal to suburban voters, who have shifted away from the Republican Party as Donald Trump increasingly influenced it, was attributed to Youngkin's distancing from Trump and hesitancy to openly embrace him. Youngkin's performance in the suburbs near Washington, D.C. were stronger than that of Trump's margins in the 2020 United States presidential election. During the final days preceding the general election held on November 2, Youngkin campaigned in the Washington metropolitan area suburbs of Northern Virginia. Previous similar attempts to combine a coalition of Trump supporters and suburban voters, including Ed Gillespie's run for governor in 2017, were met with failure. Youngkin's victory was consistent with gubernatorial candidates of the opposing party as the incumbent president usually winning in Virginia, with the notable exception of McAuliffe's victory in 2013.

=== Exit poll ===
2021 Virginia gubernatorial election voter demographics (CNN)
Demographic subgroup	Youngkin	McAuliffe	% of total vote
Ideology
Liberals	6	93	23
Moderates	39	60	41
Conservatives	93	7	36
Party
Democrats	4	96	36
Republicans	97	3	34
Independents	54	45	30
Gender
Men	56	44	48
Women	46	53	52
Race/ethnicity
White	62	38	73
Black	13	86	16
Latino	32	66	5
Asian	33	67	3
Gender by race
White men	66	34	36
White women	57	43	37
Black men	13	86	7
Black women	14	86	9
Latino men (of any race)	N/A	N/A	2
Latino women (of any race)	23	75	3
Other racial/ethnic groups	38	62	5
Age
18–24 years old	47	52	5
25–29 years old	43	54	5
30–39 years old	47	53	13
40–49 years old	51	48	18
50–64 years old	52	48	34
65 and older	55	45	26
2020 presidential vote
Biden	5	95	48
Trump	98	2	44
Education
Never attended college	61	38	15
Some college education	58	41	24
Associate degree	58	42	12
Bachelor's degree	44	55	25
Advanced degree	40	60	24
Education by race
White college graduates	47	52	37
White no college degree	76	24	36
Non-white college graduates	25	75	11
Non-white no college degree	20	79	15
Education by gender/race
White women with college degrees	39	61	18
White women without college degrees	74	25	19
White men with college degrees	55	44	19
White men without college degrees	78	22	17
Non-white	22	77	27
Issue regarded as most important
Taxes	68	32	15
Economy	55	44	33
Education	53	47	24
Coronavirus	16	84	15
Abortion	58	41	8
Abortion should be
Legal	26	73	58
Illegal	87	13	37
Region
DC Suburbs	36	64	29
Central Virginia	59	40	18
Hampton Roads	46	54	15
Richmond/Southside	50	50	18
Mountain	70	30	20
Area type
Urban	32	67	21
Suburban	53	46	60
Rural	63	36	19

== See also ==
- 2021 United States elections
- 2021 Virginia elections
- 2021 Virginia lieutenant gubernatorial election
- 2021 Virginia Attorney General election
- 2021 Virginia House of Delegates election

== Notes ==
Partisan clients
