= Amanda Chase =

American politician from Virginia

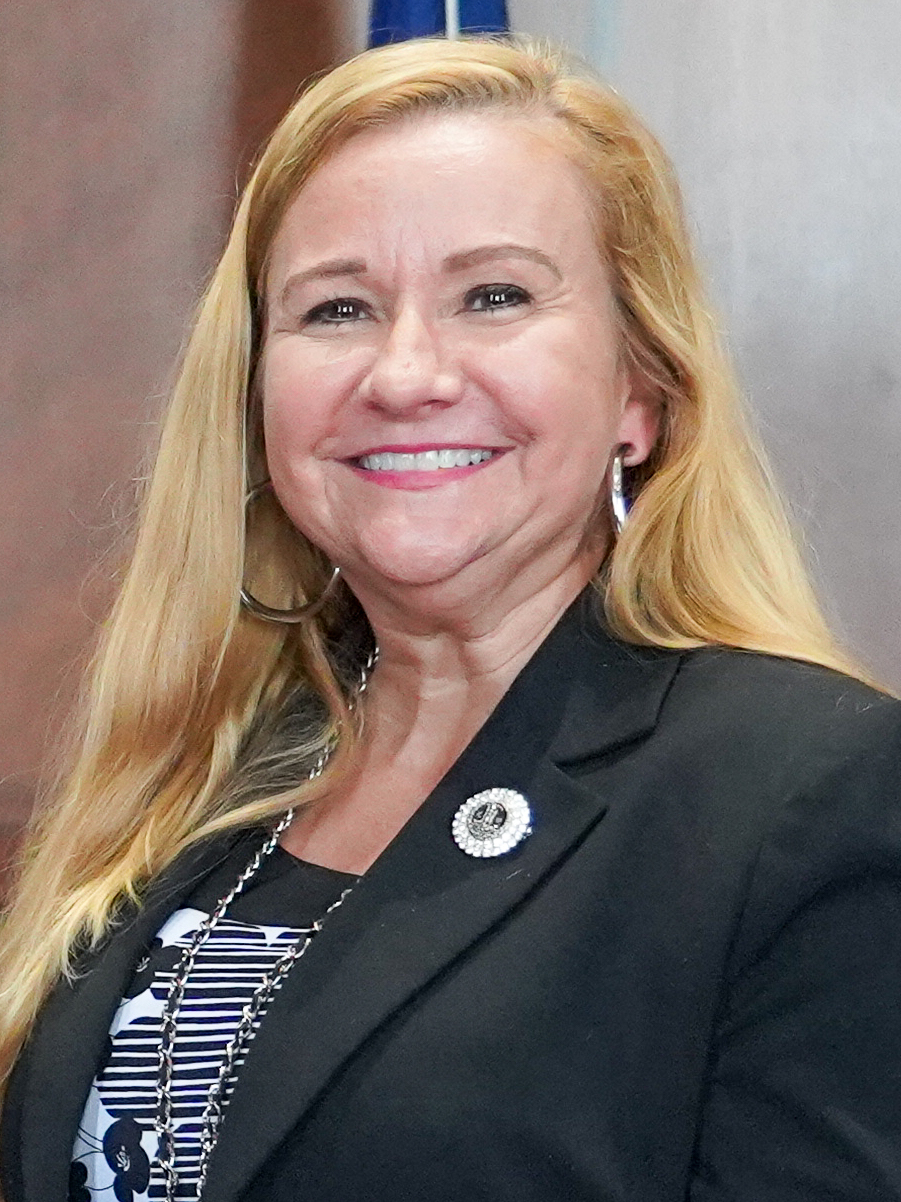
- Chase in 2022

Member of the Virginia Senate from the 11th district
- In office January 13, 2016 – January 10, 2024
- Preceded by: Steve Martin
- Succeeded by: Glen Sturtevant (redistricted)

Personal details
- Born: Amanda Freeman; December 1, 1969 (age 56) Sheffield, Alabama, U.S.
- Party: Republican
- Spouse: Michael Chase
- Children: 4
- Education: Virginia Tech (BS)
- Website: Campaign website

Amanda Freeman Chase (born December 1, 1969) is an American politician. From 2016 to 2024, she was a member of the Virginia Senate for the 11th District and represented Amelia County, the city of Colonial Heights, and part of Chesterfield County. Describing herself as "Trump in heels", Chase was narrowly defeated in the primary of her reelection campaign for a redrawn 12th District in June 2023 and left office in January 2024.

Chase has been described as far-right and as a conspiracy theorist. She has been deemed one of the most "prominent spreaders of election conspiracy theories in Virginia politics" and has been noted for her attendance at Donald Trump's rally preceding the 2021 storming of the United States Capitol, where she appeared to voice support for rioters by calling them "patriots" and suggesting that Trump might still be sworn in as president, despite losing the election to Joe Biden. She also stated, "The insurrection is actually the deep state with the politicians working against the people to overthrow our government."

The Virginia State Senate censured Chase on a 24–9 vote (with three Republicans joining the majority) for "conduct unbecoming a senator" and "fomenting insurrection against the United States", stripping Chase of her lone committee assignment. This was the first censure of a Virginia state senator since 1987. Despite saying she would "wear the censure as a badge of honor", Chase filed a federal lawsuit against the Virginia State Senate, but the suit was subsequently dismissed. In 2025, she announced her campaign for the Republican gubernatorial nomination, but she failed to qualify for the Republican primary.

== Early life and career ==
Chase was born in Sheffield, Alabama, on December 1, 1969. She has been a resident of Chesterfield County since 1979 and graduated from Monacan High School in 1988. In 1992, she received a Bachelor of Science degree in business from Virginia Tech. Chase has worked in banking and financial management. Since 2010, she has operated Chase Consulting LLC, a campaign management firm. Since 2013, Chase has been an independent contractor in the financial services industry.

== Political career ==
=== Political staffer ===
In 2009, Chase worked for Republican Ken Cuccinelli during his successful campaign for Virginia Attorney General; later, she was a staffer to Republican congressman Dave Brat.

=== Elections to the Virginia State Senate ===
In 2015, Chase won the Republican nomination in Virginia's 11th State Senate District in an upset primary victory against incumbent senator Stephen H. Martin, who had served since 1994. The solidly Republican district comprises Amelia County, Colonial Heights, and much of Chesterfield. Chase went on to defeat the Democratic nominee, attorney and retired Army colonel E. Wayne Powell, in the general election by about 69% to 31%. Chase won reelection in 2019, defeating Democratic nominee Amanda Pohl.

== Persona, positions, and controversies ==
During her political career, Chase has adopted a Donald Trump-like impact and persona. One of the most far-right members of the state Senate, she has described herself as "Trump in heels" and gained attention in Virginia politics with provocative comments and stunts. She has repeatedly promoted baseless claims that the 2020 U.S. presidential election was marred by election fraud and "stolen" by Democrats; she has also claimed that Virginia Democrats "hate white people". Chase marched with the far-right "boogaloo boys" in Richmond carrying an AR-15.

=== Removal from the Chesterfield County Republican Party ===
In 2019, Chase was removed from the Chesterfield County Republican Party Committee after clashing with others in the organization; Chase had promoted the campaign of an independent candidate for sheriff, violating a party rule barring Republican committee members from supporting a non-Republican candidate running against a Republican nominee. The move was mostly symbolic, depriving her of voting rights in the county party, but having no effect on her status as a Republican nominee.

=== Departure from Republican caucus ===
In November 2019, Chase announced that she would not caucus with the Republicans in the State Senate in 2020, citing what she called broken and failed Republican leadership, and lack of transparency. Chase remains affiliated with the Republican Party.

=== Wearing a firearm in session ===
On January 15, 2019, Chase openly carried a loaded .38-caliber handgun in a holster while presenting bills to a state Senate committee, saying she did so as "a deterrent for over-exuberant folks."

=== Dispute with Capitol Police officer ===
On March 22, 2019, Chase reportedly became "irate" and used supposed profanities at Capitol Police officers after being told that she was not allowed to park in the secured Pedestrian Plaza on Bank Street where she would park at times during session. When asked to move her car she told the officer that she would not move her vehicle "unless you let the f---ing barricades down to let me in". She was eventually allowed to park.

=== Controversial statements ===
In a July 2019 post on Facebook about the Second Amendment, Chase said "[i]t's those who are naive and unprepared that end up raped. Sorry. But I'm not going to be a statistic." After a backlash, Chase posted a video in which she declined to apologize; said that her reply was "taken out of context"; and attacked critics as "trolls".

In April 2021, a jury convicted former Minneapolis police officer Derek Chauvin of the murder of George Floyd. Chase said in a video that the conviction made her "sick" and claimed that the verdict was motivated by politics.

=== Confederate monuments ===
Chase opposed removing the Richmond, Virginia, Robert E. Lee Monument, which has become a flashpoint of protests in recent times. "Removing the Robert E. Lee statue is a cowardly capitulation to the looters and domestic terrorists." Chase further stated that the removal of Confederate statues is an "overt effort to erase all white history".

=== COVID-19 pandemic ===
During the COVID-19 pandemic, Chase refused to wear a face mask during Virginia Senate sessions, contrary to public health guidance at the time. As a result of her refusal to wear a mask, she was required to sit in a plexiglass box during Senate sessions.

=== Affiliation with Antonio Lamotta ===
Chase has repeatedly posed for photographs with Antonio Lamotta, a QAnon promoter who was arrested in Philadelphia shortly after the 2020 election for carrying pistols, an AR-15 rifle, and over 150 rounds of ammunition without a valid Pennsylvania firearms permit, a third-degree felony. Chase said that the story was "fake news" from the "fake media" and that there is "no connection" between her and Lamotta other than his being a supporter of hers.

== Support for overturning 2020 presidential election results ==
=== Support for declaration of martial law ===
In a Facebook post on December 15, 2020, after Joe Biden defeated Donald Trump in the 2020 presidential election, Chase called upon Trump to declare federal martial law and overturn the election results. Chase baselessly asserted that there was "extensive fraud here in Virginia" and alleged that the Biden–Harris campaign "cheated to win". Democratic representative Jennifer Wexton called Chase "unhinged" and Republican gubernatorial candidate Kirk Cox called her position "absurd and dangerous"; other officials also condemned Chase's statement, including Denver Riggleman, Barbara Comstock, and David Ramadan.

=== Storming of the United States Capitol and censure by the state Senate ===
Chase attended Donald Trump's rally prior to the 2021 attack on the U.S. Capitol, but stated that she left before the rioting began. Chase refused to denounce the attack on the Capitol. She praised the rioters as "Patriots who love their country and do not want to see our great republic turn into a socialist country" while falsely suggesting that left-wing "antifa or BLM agents of destruction" were to blame for the assault. (After Chase promoted this falsehood on Facebook, the social media site suspended her official Facebook account, which has more than 100,000 followers, for one week; her personal Facebook account was unaffected.)

Chase also expressed her disappointment that Vice President Mike Pence did not intercede in the counting of the electoral votes to overturn Biden's victory. Chase later said that Trump still might be sworn in for a second term, saying, "The insurrection is actually the deep state with the politicians working against the people to overthrow our government."

On January 27, 2021, the state Senate voted 24–9 to censure Chase for "conduct unbecoming a senator" and "fomenting insurrection against the United States." Three Republicans joining the majority in passing the censure resolution, which marked the first censure of a Virginia state senator since 1987. Six Republican senators did not vote. Republican leaders in the Virginia Senate removed her from her committee assignment and bemoaned her "selfishness and constant need for media attention." In February 2021, Chase sued the state Senate and its clerk, claiming that the censure violated her First Amendment rights; the court dismissed her suit in May 2021.

Chase also claimed that Democratic state Senator Jennifer McClellan, a candidate for governor, could not represent all Virginians because of her leadership role in the Virginia Legislature's Black Caucus; this was one of several statements cited in the censure resolution against Chase.

== Campaign for the 2021 Republican gubernatorial nomination ==
Chase announced on February 17, 2020, that she would be seeking the Republican gubernatorial nomination in the 2021 election. In December 2020, after the Virginia Republican Party decided to select its statewide nominees through a convention rather than an open primary, Chase said she would run for governor in the 2021 election as an independent candidate in the general election, but would remain a Republican. Chase threatened to seek the gubernatorial nomination as an independent in an "independent primary". Six days later, Chase reversed her decision to run as an independent, and continued on to run as a Republican while pushing for a primary. On January 23, 2021, the 80-member Republican State Central Committee debated a proposal by Chase and her supporters to scrap the convention in favor of a primary. Amid an acrimonious debate, deadlock, and parliamentary maneuvering, the committee voted to stay with a convention. In an interview with The New York Times, Chase vowed to "take out whichever Democratic candidate wins the nomination, and I will be the next governor of Virginia."

On February 9, 2021, Chase sued the Republican Party of Virginia, arguing that the convention is illegal under current executive orders. A Virginia circuit court judge dismissed the suit ten days later.

Chase was one of seven candidates seeking the Republican nomination for governor: the others were Delegate Kirk Cox, a longtime member of the House of Delegates; Sergio de la Peña, a retired Army colonel and former Trump Defense Department appointee; Peter Doran, a former think tank executive; Pete Snyder, a businessman; Octavia Johnson, a former Roanoke sheriff; and Glenn Youngkin, a former co-chief executive of the Carlyle Group. All of the Republican candidates for the gubernatorial nomination campaigned on the basis of their loyalty to Trump. On May 10, 2021, Chase lost her bid for nomination at the Republican nomination convention to Youngkin. She came in third place in a seven-candidate field; she was eliminated in the second-to-last round of ranked-choice voting, with 25%. The top two candidates, Youngkin and Snyder, are both multimillionaires and vastly outspent Chase, whose campaign expenditures were around $600,000 (~$683,256 in 2024). Winner Youngkin went on to defeat Democrat Terry McAuliffe in the general election.

== 2022 congressional race ==
In November 2021, Chase announced she would run for the Republican nomination to potentially take on Democratic Congresswoman Abigail Spanberger in Virginia's 7th Congressional District. In January 2022, after congressional redistricting put her home in Virginia's 1st Congressional District, Chase announced she would not run against incumbent Republican Congressman Rob Wittman.

== 2024 state senate race ==
In July 2024, Chase announced she will run for state senate to fill the 10th district seat John McGuire left open after his victory in November. Chase was unsuccessful in her attempt and finished 3rd in the Republican mass meeting in December 2024.

== Campaign for the 2025 Republican gubernatorial nomination ==
On February 26, 2025, Chase announced she would run for governor of Virginia again. In April, she did not submit the minimum number of ballot signatures and she was disqualified from the primary.

== Election results ==
2015 Virginia Senate 11th district Republican primary
Party	Candidate	Votes	%
Republican	Amanda Chase	4,907	40.48%
Republican	Stephen H. Martin (incumbent)	4,238	34.96%
Republican	Barry Moore	2,977	24.56%
Total votes		12,122	100%

2015 Virginia Senate 11th district election
Party	Candidate	Votes	%
Republican	Amanda Chase	35,147	69.39%
Democratic	Wayne Powell	15,481	30.56%
None	Write-In	24	0.05%
Total votes		50,652	100%

2019 Virginia Senate 11th district election
Party	Candidate	Votes	%
Republican	Amanda Chase	44,245	54.5%
Democratic	Amanda Pohl	36,734	45.3%
None	Write-In	189	0.2%
Total votes		81,168	100%

2023 Virginia Senate 12th district Republican primary
Party	Candidate	Votes	%
Republican	Glen Sturtevant	8,833	39.9%
Republican	Amanda Chase	8,367	37.8%
Republican	Tina Ramirez	4,956	22.4%
Total votes		22,156	100%

Round-by-round result visualization of the ranked-choice voting election

2021 Virginia GOP Convention, governor nominee
Candidate	Round 1		Round 2		Round 3		Round 4		Round 5		Round 6	
Candidate	Votes	%	Votes	%	Votes	%	Votes	%	Votes	%	Votes	%
Glenn Youngkin	4131.80	32.9%	4140.55	33.0%	4148.91	33.0%	4331.93	34.5%	5311.43	42.3%	6869.22	54.7%
Pete Snyder	3241.61	25.8%	3243.84	25.8%	3249.71	25.9%	3502.91	27.9%	4078.25	32.5%	5684.78	45.3%
Amanda Chase	2605.89	20.8%	2611.54	20.8%	2619.83	20.9%	2859.39	22.8%	3164.32	25.2%	Eliminated	
Kirk Cox	1693.58	13.5%	1698.13	13.5%	1705.90	13.6%	1859.77	14.8%	Eliminated			
Sergio de la Peña	805.35	6.4%	812.44	6.5%	829.65	6.6%	Eliminated					
Peter Doran	42.28	0.3%	47.50	0.4%	Eliminated							
Octavia Johnson	33.48	0.3%	Eliminated									
