= Penelope Gross =

American politician

Penelope A. Gross

Member of the Fairfax County Board of Supervisors from the Mason district
- In office 1996–2023
- Preceded by: Christine R. Trapnell

Personal details
- Born: Penelope Ann Schreiner; December 16, 1943 (age 82) Eugene, Oregon
- Party: Democratic Party
- Spouse: Harold M. "Hal" Gross
- Children: Sabra Michelle, Pamela Jan, David Peter
- Education: University of Oregon

Penelope Ann "Penny" Gross was a member of the Fairfax County, Virginia Board of Supervisors. She represented the Mason district, which encompasses Annandale and other unincorporated areas of Fairfax County near the city of Falls Church. She was the Vice Chairman of the board, serving under Chairman Jeff McKay.

== Career ==
Following her graduation from the University of Oregon in 1965, she went to work for Senator Wayne Morse. Following Morse's defeat in 1968, she joined the staff of Senator Frank Church. Even after Church left office in 1981, Gross continued to work as his personal secretary until his death in 1984.

From 1985 to 1988, Gross worked as a consultant to the Democratic National Committee. In 1991, she became the executive assistant to Congressman Mike Kopetski. Following Kopetski's retirement, and with Republican Christine R. Trapnell's decision not to seek reelection, Gross decided to seek the Mason district seat on the Fairfax County Board of Supervisors.

Gross' defeat of Republican William B. Bailey in the November 1995 election saw control of the Board of Supervisors return to the Democrats after a short stint in which control of the ten-member board was evenly divided between the two parties.

In the 2015 Democratic primary, Gross fended off a challenge from community activist Jessica Swanson. Gross went on to defeat independent candidate Mollie A. Loeffler in the November general election.

She retired from the Board of Supervisors at the end of her term in January 2024.

== Personal ==
Gross was born Penelope Ann Schreiner, the daughter of John W. Schreiner Jr. and the former Lois M. Hosford, and raised in Eugene, Oregon. Shortly after graduating from the University of Oregon with a BS in political science in 1965, Gross went to work in the United States Senate. She married Harold M. "Hal" Gross on September 19, 1970, with whom she had two daughters, Sabra and Pamela, and a stepson, David.
