= Sergio de la Peña =

Mexican-American politician & soldier

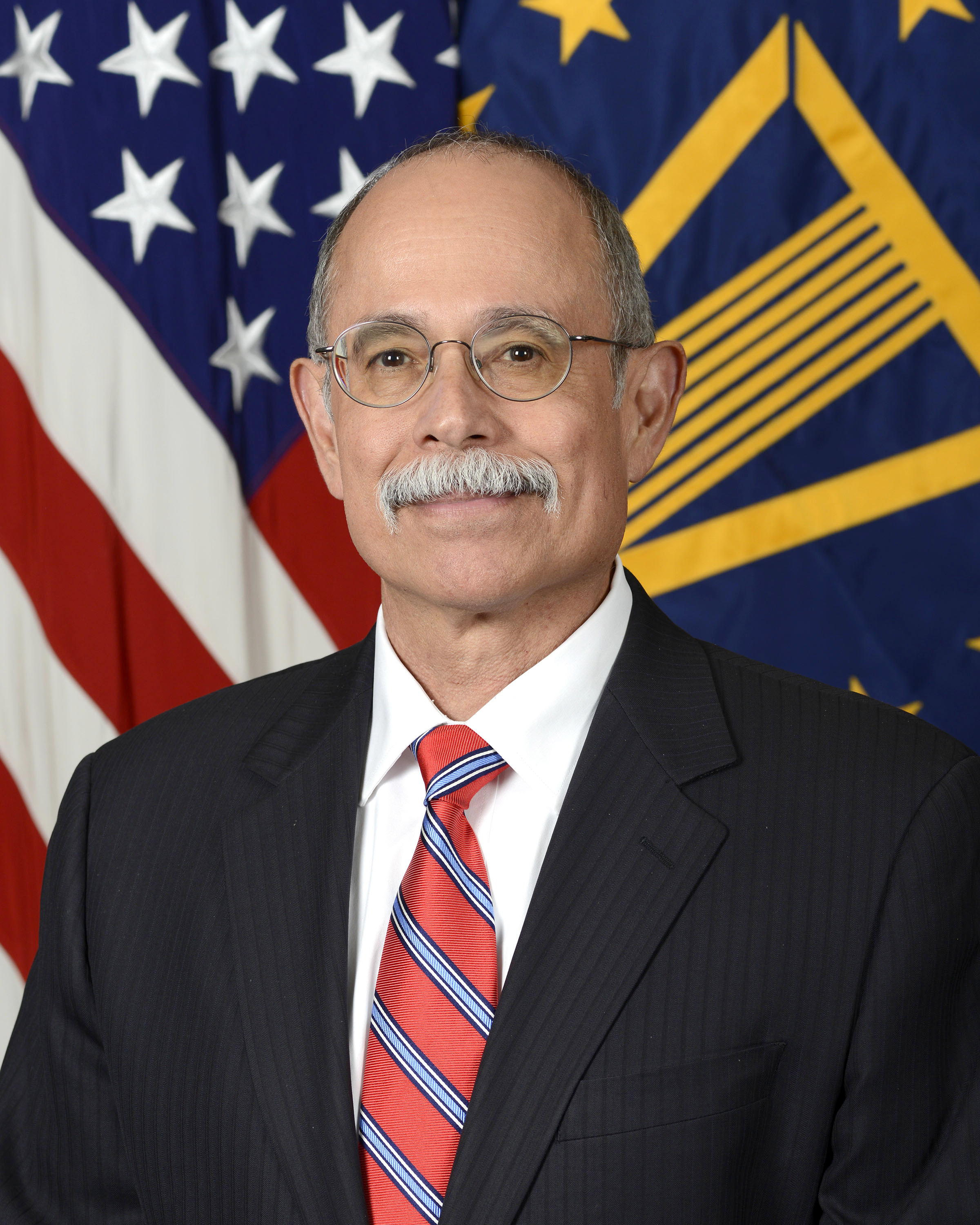
- Born: Chihuahua City, Mexico
- Military career
- Allegiance: United States
- Branch: United States Army
- Rank: Colonel
- Education: University of Iowa (BS); United States Army Command and General Staff College (MA)
- Political party: Republican

Sergio de la Peña is an American politician and retired United States Army colonel who was deputy Assistant Secretary of Defense for Western Hemisphere Affairs during the first Trump administration.

== Early life and education ==
De la Peña was born in Chihuahua, Mexico. His family moved to Roswell, New Mexico, when he was five. He graduated from the University of Iowa with a Bachelor of Science in psychology through the Reserve Officers' Training Corps, and later earned a Master of Military Art and Science degree at the United States Army Command and General Staff College. He also attended the Inter-American Defense College.

== Career ==
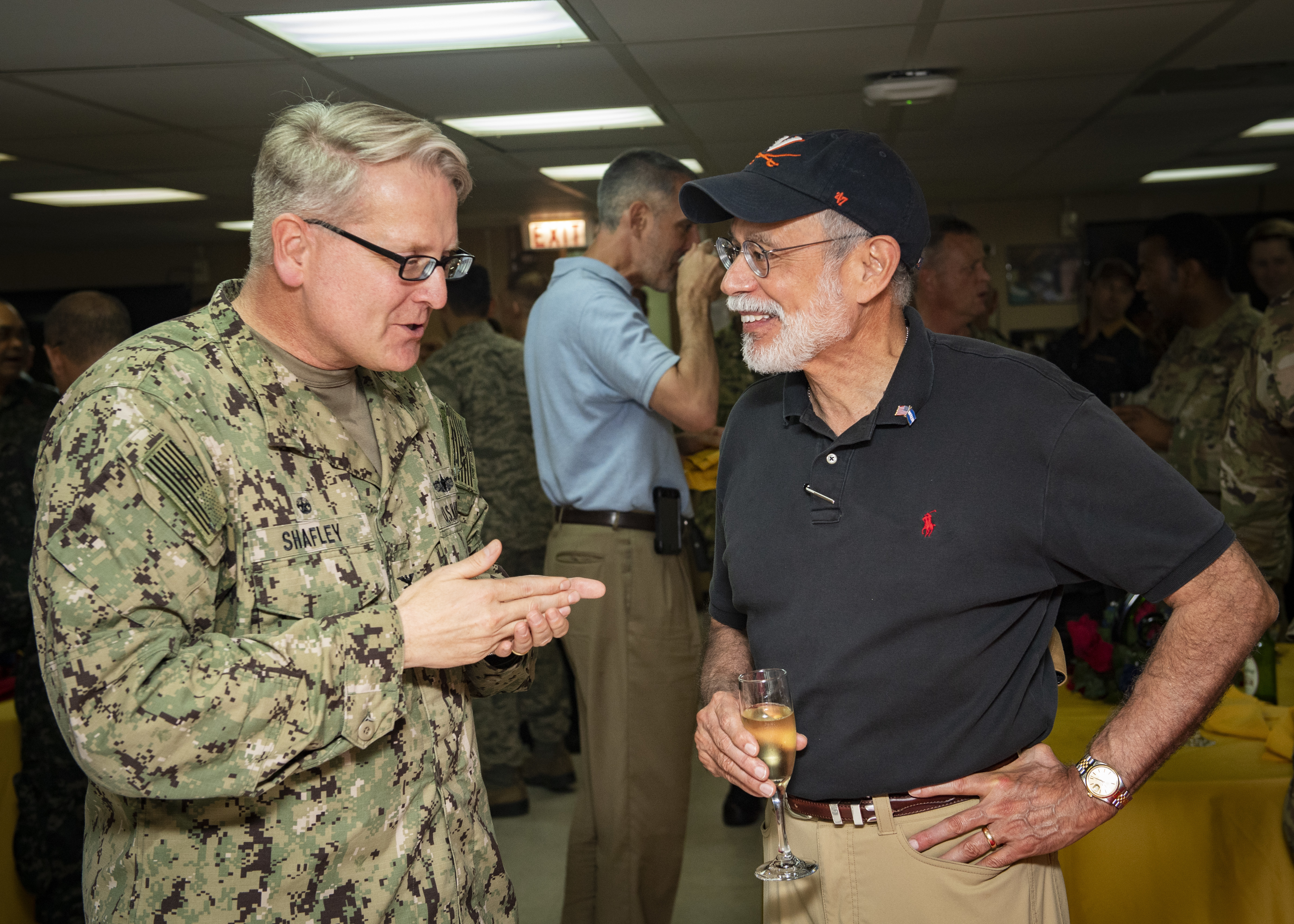
De la Peña and a U.S. Navy captain in Honduras in 2018

De la Peña served in the Army for 30 years as an air defense officer and later as a foreign area officer. As an air defense officer he served in Chaparral, HAWK and Patriot units. His later assignments included U.S. Army attaché in Venezuela, U.S. Army section chief in Chile, and commander of the U.S. Military Observer Group–Washington, which trained and deployed American service members to United Nations observer missions.

De la Peña retired from the Army as a colonel. During his career, he was also a division chief of the U.S. Northern Command. In his last assignment he was chief of the command's International Affairs Division, responsible for its military engagement with Canada and Mexico. De la Peña worked for the private military contractor L-3 before founding de la Peña Consulting, LLC in June 2011. He spent five years leading the consultancy. According to his Defense Department biography, he also taught defense and security courses to government officials and appeared as a commentator on Spanish-language news media.

=== Department of Defense ===
De la Peña was surrogate for the Donald Trump 2016 presidential campaign, and was then part of the Trump transition team assigned to the United States Department of Defense. He joined the Defense Department on January 20, 2017, as a special assistant. In 2017, Defense Secretary James Mattis appointed De la Peña as deputy Assistant Secretary of Defense for the Western Hemisphere.

In May 2018 he made a two-day visit to Ecuador, where he met Defense Minister Oswaldo Jarrín to discuss security cooperation. In an interview with El Comercio during the visit, he said the United States was concerned about drug trafficking and irregular armed groups on Ecuador's northern border, and that any cooperation would depend on what the Ecuadorian government requested. In February 2020 he visited Panama for meetings with Minister of Public Security Rolando Mirones and the administrator of the Panama Canal Authority. In a June 2020 interview with Diario Las Américas, he said that cocaine from Colombia was leaving mainly by air from Venezuela and mainly by sea from Colombia, and that U.S. efforts in the region would focus on counternarcotics operations.

=== 2021 Virginia gubernatorial election ===
On January 11, 2021, de la Peña announced his candidacy as a Republican candidate for the 2021 Virginia gubernatorial election. He campaigned for term limits on elected offices and for reversing the 2020 changes to Virginia's election laws that expanded absentee voting, ballot drop boxes and early voting. At the party's convention on May 8, 2021, which used ranked-choice voting, he received 6.4 percent of the weighted delegate vote in the first round and was eliminated after the third round of counting. Glenn Youngkin won the nomination.
