= Jeff McKay =

American politician

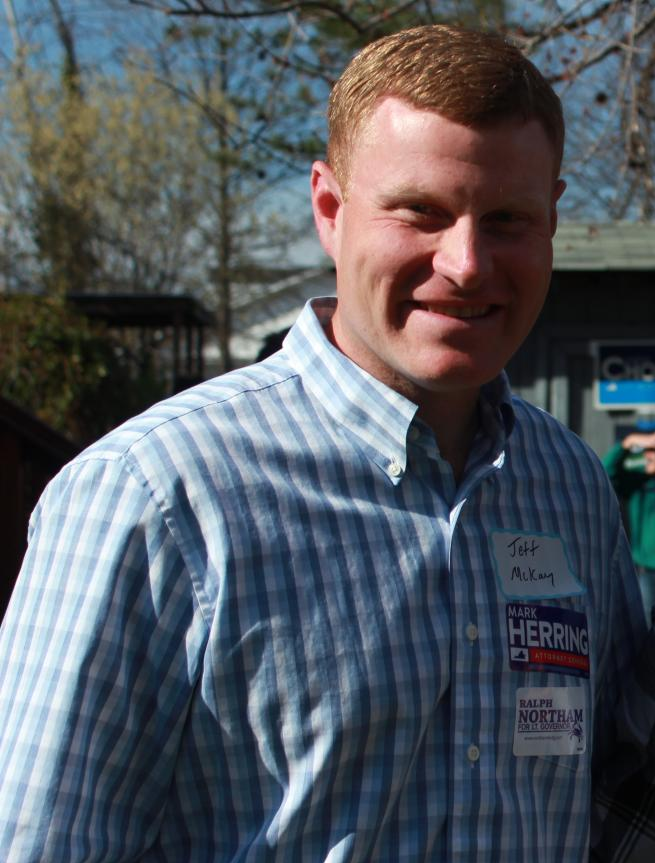

Chair of the Fairfax County Board of Supervisors
- Incumbent
- Assumed office January 1, 2020
- Preceded by: Sharon Bulova

Member of the Fairfax County Board of Supervisors from the Lee district
- In office 2008–2020
- Preceded by: Dana Kauffman
- Succeeded by: Rodney Lusk

Personal details
- Born: Jeffrey Charles McKay; September 6, 1975 (age 49)
- Political party: Democratic
- Education: James Madison University (BS)

Jeffrey Charles McKay is an American politician serving as Chairman of the Fairfax County Board of Supervisors since 2020. A member of the Democratic Party, he was first elected to the board in 2007, representing the Lee district, which includes the Springfield and Franconia areas. In 2019, he was elected as chairman, taking office in 2020.

== Education ==
McKay attended Bishop Ireton High School, a private Roman Catholic high school in Alexandria, Virginia. He graduated from James Madison University in December 1996 with a bachelor's degree in political science. He had served as president of the college Young Democrats during his sophomore and senior years, and as Chair of the Virginia Young Democrats College Caucus. In 1998, McKay graduated from the University of Virginia’s Sorensen Institute for Political Leadership.

== Political career ==
Shortly after graduating from JMU in 1996, McKay was hired as Chief of Staff to Lee District Supervisor Dana Kauffman. He continued in that position for more than a decade, until Kauffman retired in 2007 and he won the November election to succeed him. Following his time as Lee District Supervisor, McKay was elected countywide in 2019 to serve as Chairman of the Fairfax County Board of Supervisors.

Since joining the Board, McKay co-created Fairfax County's One Fairfax resolution and policy. McKay supported expand benefits for employees, including six week of paid family leave and entering into the county's first collective bargaining agreement with unions. He is Chair of the Dulles Corridor Advisory Committee, as well as on the board of the Northern Virginia Transportation Authority, Northern Virginia Transportation Commission (NVTC), the Metropolitan Washington Council of Governments, and the Virginia Association of Counties. Jeff was also named one of Northern Virginia’s 50 Most Influential People of 2024 by Northern Virginia Magazine.

Following an ethics complaint regarding his purchase in 2017 of a home not listed in MLS from a developer who had business before the Fairfax County Board of Supervisors, McKay was investigated by the Virginia State Police in 2019. The investigation considered whether McKay's purchase of his family home from a developer friend for $850,000 in 2017 was an undisclosed gift, which would have been a misdemeanor. McKay denied malfeasance, and was later cleared of any wrongdoing.

After their last pay raise in 2015, the Fairfax County Board of Supervisors in March 2023 proposed a 36% pay increase for supervisors and a 45% pay increase for the board chair. Following hours of criticism from County residents, the board approved in an 8-2 vote a 29% pay increase for themselves and a 38% pay increase for the board chair (McKay). McKay stated before the vote: "The board does not enjoy raising its salary. I do not enjoy raising a future board's salary."

In 2024, amid a housing shortage in the D.C. metropolitan area, McKay said that Fairfax County did not intend to follow the lead of other Northern Virginia counties in eliminating single-family exclusive zoning regulations. McKay said it was important to "protect the integrity of our single-family neighborhoods" and that Fairfax County was not capable of accommodating missing middle housing. McKay supports relaxing rules for accessory dwelling units.

On December 5, 2024 at a Post Election Virtual Legislative Roundtable hosted by Dulles Area Transit Association (DATA) McKay discussed the importance of the American Legion Memorial Bridge revitalization project saying “The bridge has to be rebuilt. It’s way overdue. We’re in a clock that is already ticking”.

== Personal life ==
McKay is a lifelong Fairfax County resident, born and raised on the historic Route One Corridor in Lee District. McKay married Crystal Newsome in 2005. They have two children, Leann and Aidan.

== Electoral history ==
Lee District general election results, 2007
Party	Candidate	Votes	%
Democratic	Jeff McKay	10,377	64.6
Republican	Doug Boulter	5,656	35.2
n/a	Write-ins	20	0.1
Total votes		16,053	100.0
Democratic hold			

Lee District general election results, 2011
Party	Candidate	Votes	%
Democratic	Jeff McKay	14,425	98.1
n/a	Write-ins	272	1.9
Total votes		14,697	100.0
Democratic hold			

Lee District general election results, 2015
Party	Candidate	Votes	%
Democratic	Jeff McKay	13,104	96.8
n/a	Write-ins	429	3.2
Total votes		13,533	100.0
Democratic hold			

Fairfax County Chairman of the Board of Supervisors Democratic primary results, 2019
Party	Candidate	Votes	%
Democratic	Jeff McKay	29,702	42.5
Democratic	Alicia Plerhoples	21,980	31.4
Democratic	Ryan McElveen	11,439	16.4
Democratic	Tim Chapman	6,851	9.8
Total votes		69,972	100.0

Fairfax County Chairman of the Board of Supervisors general election results, 2019
Party	Candidate	Votes	%
Democratic	Jeff McKay	195,342	66.5
Republican	Joseph Galdo	97,608	33.2
n/a	Write-ins	1,006	0.3
Total votes		293,956	100.0
Democratic hold			
