= V. Earl Dickinson =

American politician

Member of the Virginia House of Delegates
- In office January 12, 1972 – January 9, 2002
- Preceded by: Matt G. Anderson
- Succeeded by: Bill Janis
- Constituency: 32nd district (1972–1982); 29th district (1982–1983); 56th district (1983–2002)

Personal details
- Born: Vivian Earl Dickinson; July 7, 1924 Spotsylvania, Virginia, U.S.
- Died: June 15, 2006 (aged 81) Louisa, Virginia, U.S.
- Party: Democratic
- Spouse: Mary Louise Walton
- Education: University of Richmond (BS); University of Virginia (LLB)
- Occupation: Lawyer; politician

Vivian Earl Dickinson (July 7, 1924 – June 15, 2006) was an American lawyer and politician who served as a member of the Virginia House of Delegates from 1972 until his retirement in 2002.

Virginia House of Delegates
Preceded by Matt G. Anderson	Member of the Virginia House of Delegates from the 32nd district January 12, 1972–January 13, 1982	Succeeded by Bill Axselle; Frank Hargrove; Robert B. Ball; Robison James
Preceded by Lew Parker	Member of the Virginia House of Delegates from the 29th district January 13, 1982–January 12, 1983	Succeeded by Al Smith
Preceded by None (district created)	Member of the Virginia House of Delegates from the 56th district January 12, 1983–January 9, 2002	Succeeded by Bill Janis
