= Virginia's 12th Senate district =

American legislative district

Virginia's 12th State Senate district
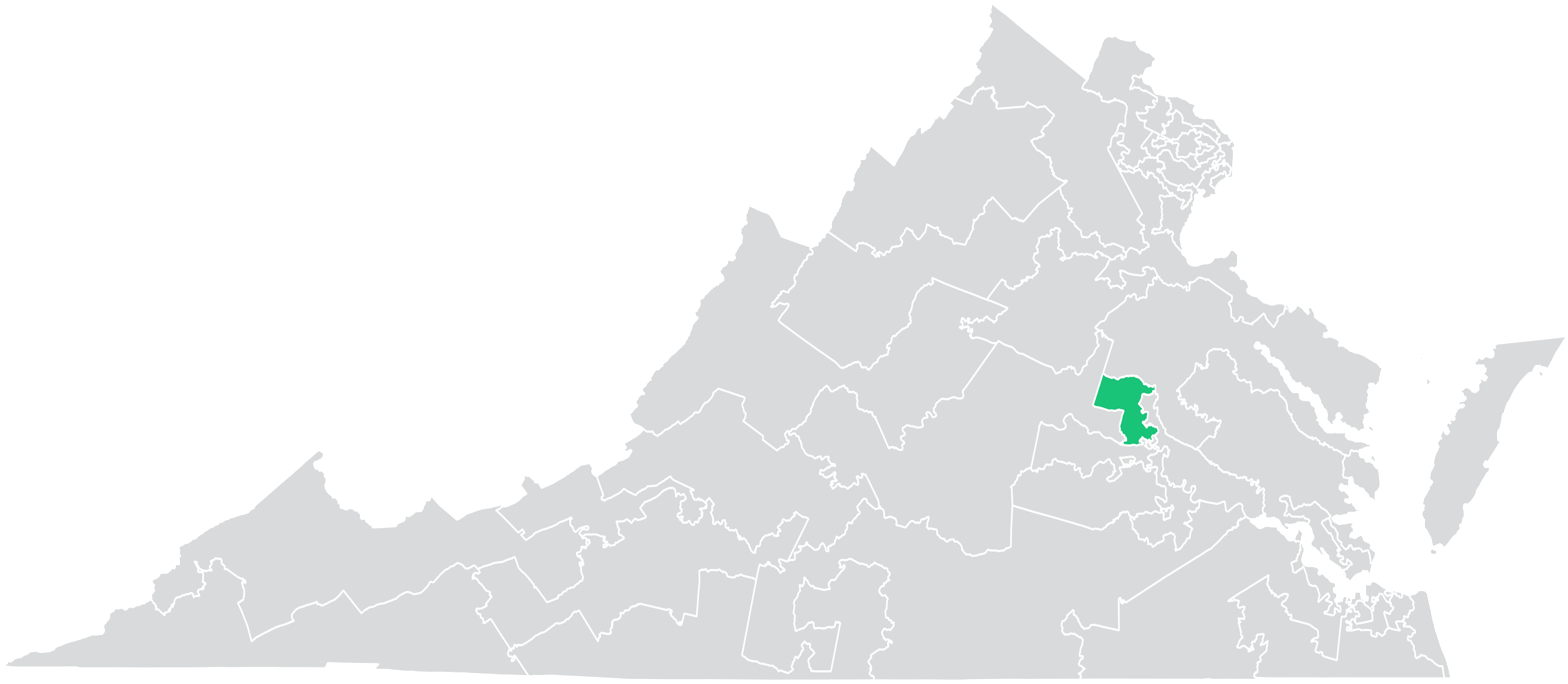
Senator
| Glen Sturtevant; R–Richmond |
- Demographics: 66% White; 12% Black; 7% Hispanic; 12% Asian; 3% Other
- Population (2019): 220,099
- Registered voters: 153,111

Virginia's 12th Senate district is one of 40 districts in the Senate of Virginia. It has been represented by Republican Glen Sturtevant since 2024.

== Geography ==
District 12 is located in central Virginia, including portions of Chesterfield County and the entirety of the city of Colonial Heights.

The district overlaps with Virginia's 1st and 4th congressional districts, and with the 72nd, 73rd, 74th, 76th, and 77th districts of the Virginia House of Delegates.

== Recent election results ==
=== 2019 ===
2019 Virginia Senate election, District 12
Primary election
| Party | Candidate | Votes | % |
|---|---|---|---|
| Democratic | Debra Rodman | 7,051 | 60.0 |
| Democratic | Veena Gupta Lothe | 4,705 | 40.0 |
| Total votes | | 11,758 | 100 |
General election
| Republican | Siobhan Dunnavant (incumbent) | 39,730 | 50.8 |
| Democratic | Debra Rodman | 38,401 | 49.1 |
| Total votes | | 78,274 | 100 |

=== 2015 ===
2015 Virginia Senate election, District 12
Primary election
| Party | Candidate | Votes | % |
|---|---|---|---|
| Republican | Siobhan Dunnavant | 7,008 | 38.2 |
| Republican | Bill Janis | 5,573 | 30.4 |
| Republican | Vincent Haley | 4,046 | 22.0 |
| Republican | Edward Whitlock | 1,728 | 9.4 |
| Total votes | | 18,358 | 100 |
General election
| Republican | Siobhan Dunnavant | 25,504 | 57.6 |
| Democratic | Deborah Repp | 16,797 | 38.0 |
| Independent | Robert Johnson | 1,881 | 4.3 |
| Total votes | | 44,247 | 100 |
| Republican hold | | | |

=== 2011 ===
2011 Virginia Senate election, District 12
| Party | Candidate | Votes | % |
|---|---|---|---|
| Republican | Walter Stosch (incumbent) | 28,438 | 95.5 |
| Total votes | | 29,779 | 100 |
| Republican hold | | | |

=== Federal and statewide results ===
| Year | Office | Results |
|---|---|---|
| 2020 | President | Biden 54.1–44.1% |
| 2017 | Governor | Northam 51.6–47.2% |
| 2016 | President | Clinton 48.3–45.2% |
| 2014 | Senate | Gillespie 52.8–43.9% |
| 2013 | Governor | Cuccinelli 48.3–40.2% |
| 2012 | President | Romney 55.2–43.5% |
| 2012 | Senate | Allen 52.6–47.4% |

== Historical results ==
All election results below took place prior to 2011 redistricting, and thus were under different district lines.

=== 2007 ===
2007 Virginia Senate election, District 12
Primary election
| Party | Candidate | Votes | % |
|---|---|---|---|
| Republican | Walter Stosch (incumbent) | 8,547 | 50.8 |
| Republican | Joseph E. Blackburn, Jr. | 8,281 | 49.2 |
| Total votes | | 16,828 | 100 |
General election
| Republican | Walter Stosch (incumbent) | 26,265 | 97.3 |
| Total votes | | 27,002 | 100 |
| Republican hold | | | |

=== 2003 ===
2003 Virginia Senate election, District 12
| Party | Candidate | Votes | % |
|---|---|---|---|
| Republican | Walter Stosch (incumbent) | 22,497 | 98.3 |
| Total votes | | 22,875 | 100 |
| Republican hold | | | |

=== 1999 ===
1999 Virginia Senate election, District 12
| Party | Candidate | Votes | % |
|---|---|---|---|
| Republican | Walter Stosch (incumbent) | 24,451 | 98.7 |
| Total votes | | 24,784 | 100 |
| Republican hold | | | |

=== 1995 ===
1995 Virginia Senate election, District 12
| Party | Candidate | Votes | % |
|---|---|---|---|
| Republican | Walter Stosch (incumbent) | 31,833 | 77.1 |
| Independent | Murray Steinberg | 9,428 | 22.8 |
| Total votes | | 41,282 | 100 |
| Republican hold | | | |
