= John McGuire (Virginia politician) =

American politician (born 1968)

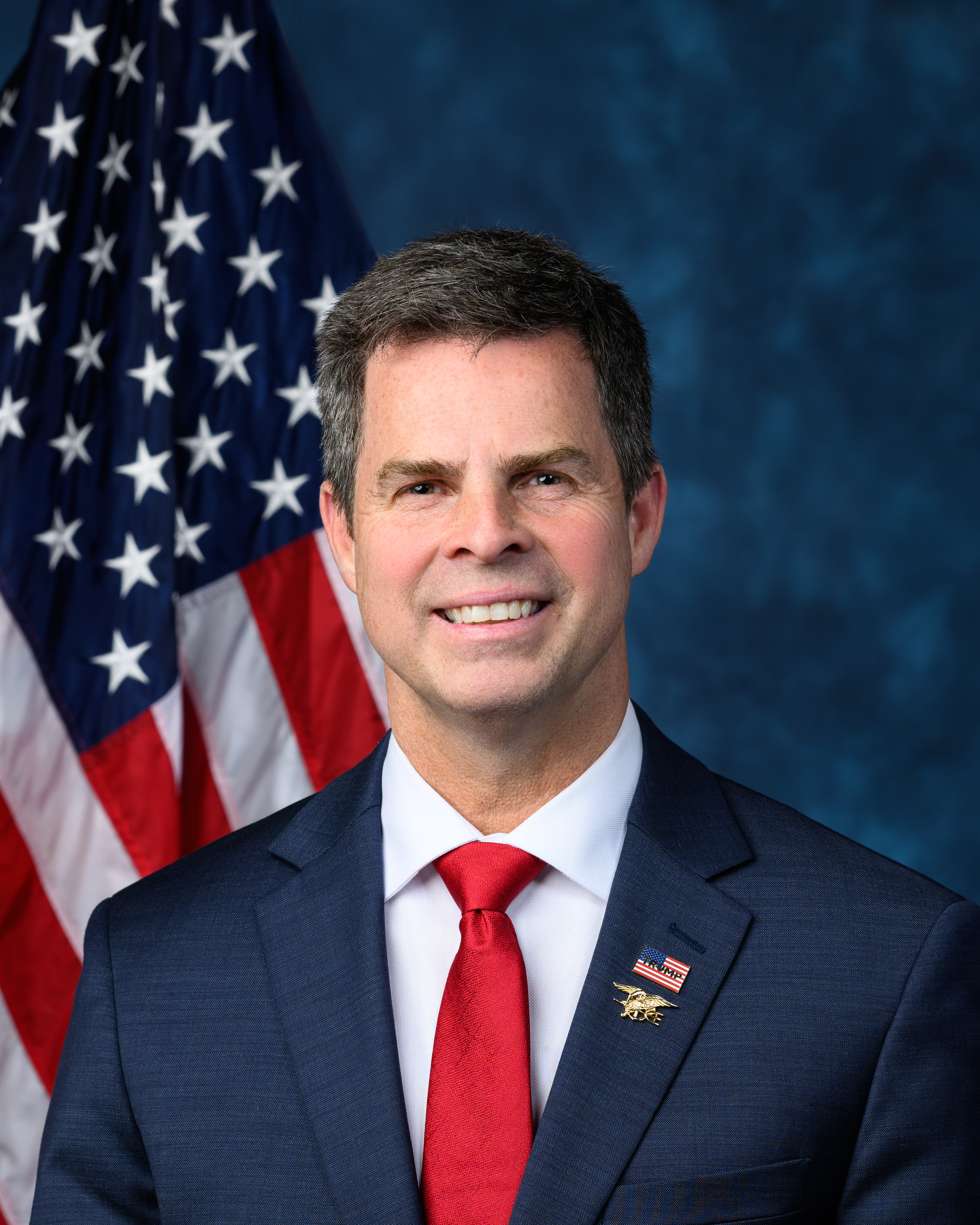
- Official portrait, 2024

Member of the U.S. House of Representatives from Virginia's 5th district
- Incumbent
- Assumed office January 3, 2025
- Preceded by: Bob Good

Member of the Virginia Senate from the 10th district
- In office January 10, 2024 – January 3, 2025
- Preceded by: Ghazala Hashmi (redistricted)
- Succeeded by: Luther Cifers

Member of the Virginia House of Delegates from the 56th district
- In office January 10, 2018 – January 10, 2024
- Preceded by: Peter Farrell
- Succeeded by: Tom Garrett

Personal details
- Born: John Joseph McGuire III; August 24, 1968 (age 58) Richmond, Virginia, U.S.
- Party: Republican
- Spouse: Tracy McGuire
- Children: 5
- Education: Northwest Florida State College (attended)
- Website: House website Campaign website

Military service
- Allegiance: United States
- Branch/service: United States Navy
- Years of service: 1988–1998
- Unit: U.S. Navy SEALs

John Joseph McGuire III (born August 24, 1968) is an American politician, businessman, and former United States Navy SEAL serving as the U.S. representative for Virginia's 5th congressional district since 2025. A member of the Republican Party, he previously served in the Virginia Senate from 2024 to 2025 and in the Virginia House of Delegates from 2018 to 2024.

McGuire was elected to the Virginia House of Delegates in 2017, and represented the old 56th district which comprised areas to the North and West of Richmond, Virginia. He was then elected to the newly redrawn 10th Senate district in 2023.

McGuire was the Republican nominee for the United States House of Representatives in Virginia's 5th congressional district in the 2024 election, having defeated the incumbent Bob Good in the primary. The final vote tally saw McGuire beating Good by 374 votes, with election results being certified on July 2. McGuire's win was upheld in a recount requested by Good. McGuire, on November 5, won against his Democratic opponent Gloria Witt. He assumed office on January 3, 2025, succeeding Good.

== Early career ==
McGuire served as a United States Navy SEAL. In 2006, after 10 years in the Military, McGuire suffered severe injuries from a trampoline accident in which he broke his neck. Afterward, McGuire founded a physical training business, SEAL Team Physical Training, that has been employed by Virginia Commonwealth University sports teams.

== Virginia House of Delegates ==
In 2017, McGuire ran for the Virginia House of Delegates for the 56th district, then held by retiring Republican incumbent Peter Farrell. He told the Richmond Times-Dispatch that his main motivation for running was that he was "interested in growing businesses in Virginia and wants to continue providing support for veterans and law enforcement officers".

McGuire won a hotly contested June 2017 Republican primary with 31% of the vote, defeating five other candidates.

In the general election, McGuire defeated health care consultant Melissa Dart by a 60% to 40% margin.

McGuire spent his first two years with Republicans holding a narrow majority in the House of Delegates. He introduced a bill to add a veteran indicator on Virginia drivers' licenses which was signed into law in 2018. Running for re-election in 2019, McGuire cited "giving teachers a 5% pay raise without raising your taxes while balancing the budget" as the key legislative achievement of his first two years.

In October 2019, while campaigning for re-election, McGuire declined to commit to completing his second term in office, responding to widespread speculation that he was considering a congressional campaign. After winning re-election in November, McGuire announced his candidacy for U.S. Congress for Virginia's 7th congressional district. McGuire lost a closely contested convention to state Delegate Nick Freitas, who went on to narrowly lose to Abigail Spanberger in the 2020 election.

McGuire publicly opposed Virginia's ratification of the Equal Rights Amendment, stating that the resolution had missed the deadline for ratification.

McGuire was a speaker at the gun rights 2020 VCDL Lobby Day in January 2020. McGuire attended Stop the Steal rallies throughout Virginia in 2020. He has claimed the COVID-19 pandemic was a "plan-demic" designed to change voting laws and rig the 2020 presidential election. McGuire attended president Donald Trump's January 6, 2021 rally in Washington, D.C., but denied participating in the subsequent attack on the United States Capitol.

McGuire was the sole vote in the Virginia Senate against a ban on child marriage in 2024.

== U.S. House of Representatives ==
=== Elections ===
==== 2024 ====
McGuire declared his candidacy for the U.S. Congress in 2024, having been recruited by allies of former Speaker of the House Kevin McCarthy to challenge incumbent Bob Good as part of what Politico described as a "vengeance operation" against those who voted to oust him. McGuire was also endorsed by several members of Congress and former President Donald Trump; since Good had initially backed Ron DeSantis against Trump in the Republican presidential primaries. McGuire defeated Good by a margin of 370 votes.

=== Tenure ===
McGuire was sworn in to the 119th United States Congress on January 3, 2025.

McGuire voted for the 2025 One Big Beautiful Bill Act.

=== Committee assignments ===
For the 119th Congress:

- Committee on Armed Services
  - Subcommittee on Cyber, Information Technologies, and Innovation
  - Subcommittee on Tactical Air and Land Forces
- Committee on Oversight and Government Reform
  - Subcommittee on Cybersecurity, Information Technology, and Government Innovation
  - Subcommittee on Health Care and Financial Services

=== Caucus memberships ===
- Republican Study Committee

== Personal life ==
McGuire is a Baptist. He and his wife, Tracy, a real estate broker, have five children together. He previously lived in Richmond, but has since moved to Goochland.

== Electoral history ==
2017 House of Delegates District 56 Republican primary
Party	Candidate	Votes	%
Republican	John McGuire III	2,732	30.9%
Republican	Graven Winslow Craig	2,070	23.4%
Republican	Matt Clay Pinsker	2,008	22.7%
Republican	George Swifton Goodwin III	995	11.3%
Republican	Surya Prakash Dhakar	952	10.8%
Republican	John Francis Prendergast	73	0.8%
Total votes		8,830	100.0%

2017 Virginia House of Delegates District 56 general election
Party	Candidate	Votes	%
Republican	John McGuire III	18,792	59.5%
Democratic	Melissa Miscione Dart	12,761	40.4%
Write-in		44	0.1%
Total votes		31,597	100.0%
Republican hold			

2019 Virginia House of Delegates District 56 general election
Party	Candidate	Votes	%
Republican	John McGuire III (incumbent)	20,250	61.0%
Democratic	Juanita Joan Matkins	12,929	38.9%
Write-in		36	0.1%
Total votes		33,215	100.0%
Republican hold			

2021 Virginia House of Delegates District 56 general election
Party	Candidate	Votes	%
Republican	John McGuire III (incumbent)	27,706	61.6%
Democratic	Blakely Kathryn Lockhart	17,187	38.2%
Write-in		65	0.1%
Total votes		44,958	100.0%
Republican hold			

2023 Virginia's 10th State Senate district general election
Party	Candidate	Votes	%
Republican	John McGuire III	59,013	91.16%
Write-in		5,721	8.84%
Total votes		64,734	100.0%
Republican win (new seat)			

Virginia's 5th Congressional district 2024 Republican primary
Party	Candidate	Votes	%
Republican	John J. McGuire III	31,583	50.3%
Republican	Bob Good (incumbent)	31,209	49.7%
Total votes		62,972	100.0%

2024 Virginia's 5th congressional district election
Party	Candidate	Votes	%
Republican	John McGuire III	249,564	57.3
Democratic	Gloria Witt	184,229	42.3
Write-in		2,046	0.5
Total votes		435,839	100.0
Republican hold			

2026 Virginia's 5th congressional district election
Party	Candidate	Votes	%
Republican	John McGuire III	181,640	50.1
Democratic	Tom S. P. Perriello	174,477	48.1
Independent	Cooke C. Harvey	5,809	1.6
Write-in		715	0.2
Total votes		362,641	100.0
Republican hold			

== See also ==
- List of United States Navy SEALs

U.S. House of Representatives
Preceded by Bob Good	Member of the U.S. House of Representatives from Virginia's 5th congressional district 2025–present	Incumbent
U.S. order of precedence (ceremonial)
Preceded by Addison McDowell	United States representatives by seniority 403rd	Succeeded by Mark Messmer
