= Frederick Gray =

Frederick Gray may refer to:

- Frederick Gray (politician) (1853–1933), Australian politician
- Frederick T. Gray (1918–1992), Virginia attorney and, briefly, attorney general during Massive Resistance
- Frederick T. Gray Jr. (born 1951), American politician, secretary of the Commonwealth of Virginia
- Frederick William Gray (1878–1960), American botanist
- Sir Frederick Gray, fictional minister of defense in several James Bond films

== See also ==
- Fred Gray (attorney) (born 1930), American civil rights attorney and activist
- Fred Gray (composer), composer of video game music
- Freddy Gray (born 1980), British journalist
- Freddie Gray (1989–2015), African-American man who died in police custody in Baltimore, see Killing of Freddie Gray
- Frederick Grey (1805–1878), Royal Navy admiral
