= 2019 Henrico County Commonwealth's Attorney election =

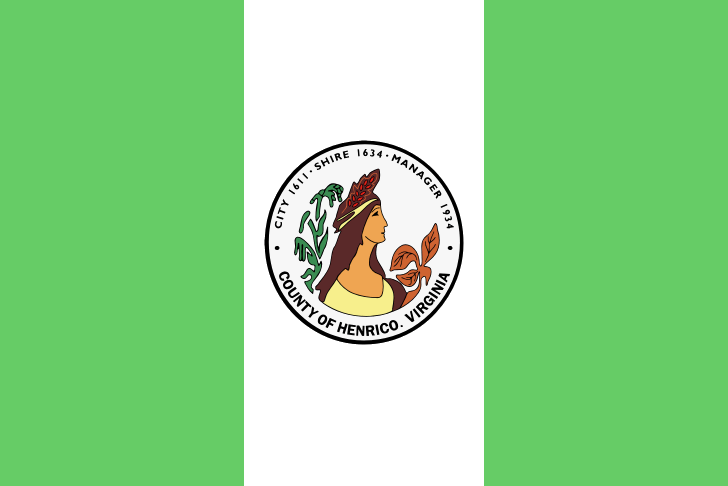
- November 5, 2019
Candidate	Shannon Taylor	Owen Conway
Party	Democratic	Republican
Popular vote	65,296	38,582
Percentage	62.68%	37.03%
- Precinct results Taylor: 50–60% 60–70% 70–80% 80–90% Conway: 50–60% 60–70%
Previous Attorney
Shannon Taylor
Democratic
Attorney
Shannon Taylor
Democratic

The 2019 Henrico County Commonwealth's Attorney election was held on November 5, 2019, to elect the Commonwealth's Attorney of Henrico County, Virginia, concurrently with elections to the Senate of Virginia and Virginia House of Delegates. Incumbent Democratic Commonwealth's Attorney Shannon Taylor won reelection to a second term against Republican nominee Owen Conway, a former worker for the office, by a wide margin.

== Background and election ==
Attorney Shannon Taylor had been serving as the Commonwealth's Attorney since 2012. After her win in the 2011 election, she fired several lawyers in a push for a diverse and different office. One of those was Owen Conway, whom Taylor faced in the election.

During the election, Taylor was accused of bribery from John J. Trak, a convicted felon, during the 2015 election, with Taylor confirming the donation and Conway saying that the donation was "unethical and improper."

== Candidates ==
=== Republican ===
- Owen Conway, attorney and former assistant Commonwealth's Attorney (1991–2011)

=== Democratic ===
- Shannon Taylor, incumbent Commonwealth's Attorney

== Results ==
Taylor defeated Conway with a landslide victory, earning 61% of the total vote.

2019 Henrico County Commonwealth's Attorney Election
Party	Candidate	Votes	%
Democratic	Shannon Taylor	65,296	62.68%
Republican	Owen Conway	38,582	37.03%
