= Virginia's 10th Senate district =

American legislative district

Virginia's 10th State Senate district
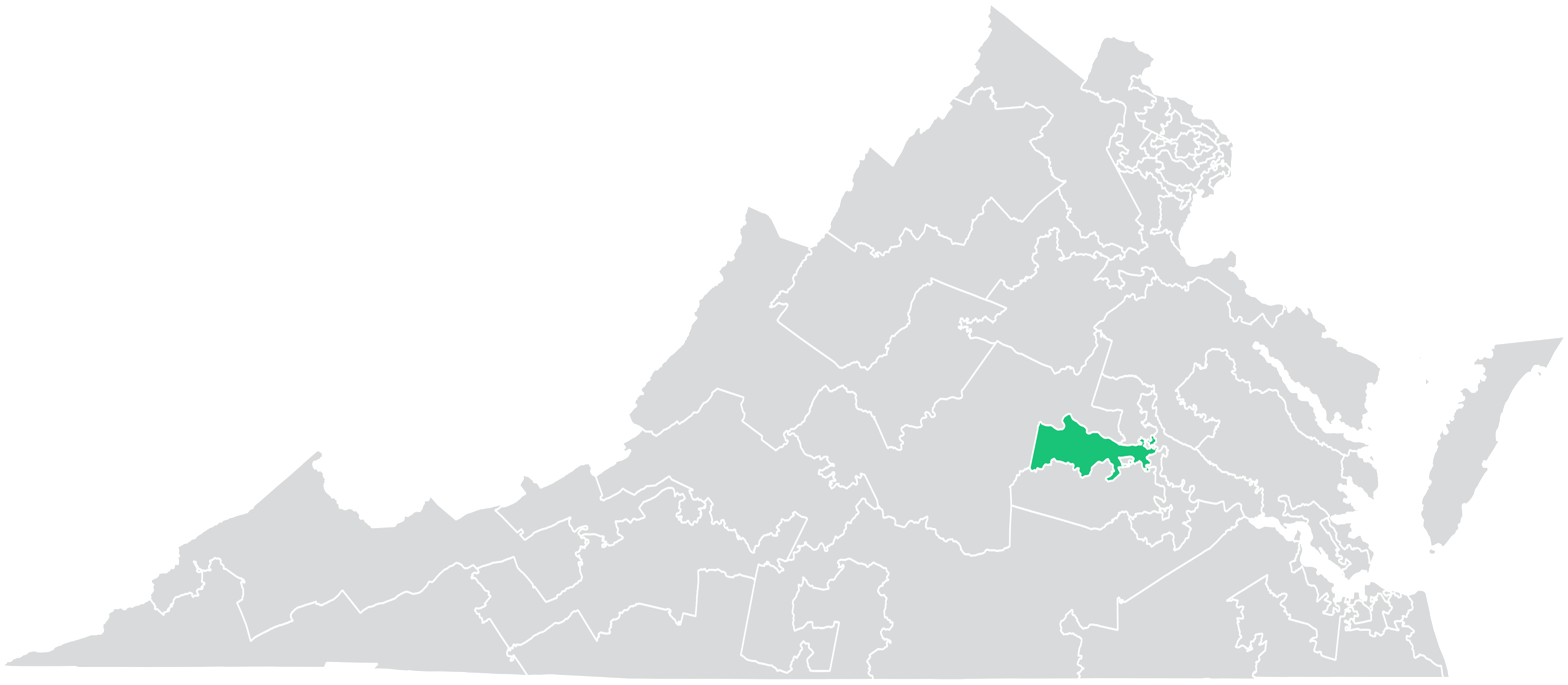
Senator
Luther Cifers; R–Farmville
- Demographics: 65% White; 21% Black; 7% Hispanic; 4% Asian; 3% Other
- Population (2019): 212,874
- Registered voters: 157,579

Virginia's 10th Senate district is one of 40 districts in the Senate of Virginia. The district was represented by Republican John McGuire, following its creation after re-districting. However, McGuire resigned on January 3, 2025 to become the United States representative for Virginia's 5th congressional district. A special election was held to finish the remainder of McGuire's term which was won by Luther Cifers.

== Geography ==
District 10 is located in central Virginia, including the counties of Amelia, Appomattox, Buckingham, Cumberland, Fluvanna, Goochland, Powhatan, and portions of Hanover, Louisa, and Prince Edward.

The district is located entirely within Virginia's 5th congressional district, and overlaps with the 50th, 56th, 57th, 59th, 60th, and 72nd districts of the Virginia House of Delegates.

== Recent election results ==
=== 2025 ===
In 2023 the Senate district was moved switching geographical places with Virginia's 15th Senate district, as a result the 10th district became Republican while the 15th became Democratic.

2025 Virginia Senate Special election, District 10
Party	Candidate	Votes	%
Republican	Luther Cifers	12,027	57.7%
Democratic	John K. "Jack" Trammell	8,775	42.1%
Total votes		20,828	100.00%
Republican hold			

=== 2019 ===
2019 Virginia Senate election, District 10
Primary election
Party	Candidate	Votes	%
Democratic	Ghazala Hashmi	5,246	49.4
Democratic	Eileen McNeil Bedell	4,347	40.9
Democratic	Zachary Brown	1,032	9.7
Total votes		10,627	100
General election
Democratic	Ghazala Hashmi	44,548	54.1
Republican	Glen Sturtevant (incumbent)	37,737	45.8
Total votes		82,377	100
Democratic gain from Republican			

=== 2015 ===
2015 Virginia Senate election, District 10
Primary election
Party	Candidate	Votes	%
Democratic	Daniel Gecker	4,730	46.5
Democratic	Emily Francis	3,487	45.5
Democratic	Alex McMurtrie Jr.	1,957	19.2
Total votes		10,178	100
General election
Republican	Glen Sturtevant	27,651	49.8
Democratic	Daniel Gecker	26,173	47.1
Independent	Marleen Durfee	1,136	2.0
Libertarian	Carl Loser	527	0.9
Total votes		55,547	100
Republican hold			

=== 2011 ===
2011 Virginia Senate election, District 10
Party	Candidate	Votes	%
Republican	John Watkins (incumbent)	18,496	56.4
Democratic	David Bernard	14,189	43.3
Total votes		32,771	100
Republican hold			

=== Federal and statewide results ===
Year	Office	Results
2024	President	Trump 62.8–35.9%
2020	President	Biden 58.6–39.6%
2017	Governor	Northam 57.2–41.6%
2016	President	Clinton 53.4–40.3%
2014	Senate	Warner 49.4–47.1%
2013	Governor	McAuliffe 47.1–42.3%
2012	President	Obama 50.4–48.2%
2012	Senate	Kaine 53.7–46.3%

== Historical results ==
All election results below took place prior to 2011 redistricting, and thus were under different district lines.

=== 2007 ===
2007 Virginia Senate election, District 10
Party	Candidate	Votes	%
Republican	John Watkins (incumbent)	27,515	97.6
Total votes		28,204	100
Republican hold			

=== 2003 ===
2003 Virginia Senate election, District 10
Party	Candidate	Votes	%
Republican	John Watkins (incumbent)	27,637	99.2
Total votes		27,863	100
Republican hold			

=== 1999 ===
1999 Virginia Senate election, District 10
Party	Candidate	Votes	%
Republican	John Watkins (incumbent)	21,366	69.9
Independent	Alex McMurtrie Jr.	9,164	30.0
Total votes		30,581	100
Republican hold			

=== 1998 special ===
1998 Virginia Senate special election, District 10
Party	Candidate	Votes	%
Republican	John Watkins	5,005	97.9
Total votes		5,112	100
Republican hold			

=== 1995 ===
1995 Virginia Senate election, District 10
Party	Candidate	Votes	%
Republican	Joseph B. Benedetti (incumbent)	32,554	99.4
Total votes		32,738	100
Republican hold			
