= Jack Reid (politician) =

American politician (1942–2022)

Member of the Virginia House of Delegates from the 72nd district
- In office January 10, 1990 – January 9, 2008
- Preceded by: Bill Axselle
- Succeeded by: Jimmie Massie

Personal details
- Born: John Spence Reid; August 1, 1942 Norfolk, Virginia, U.S.
- Died: July 17, 2022 (aged 79)
- Party: Republican
- Spouse: Judi
- Children: 2, including John
- Education: Wofford College (BA); University of Virginia (MEd)

John Spence Reid (August 1, 1942 – July 17, 2022) was an American politician of the Republican Party. He was a member of the Virginia House of Delegates from 1990 to 2008. His son, John, was the Republican nominee for the 2025 Virginia lieutenant governor's race.
