= Tony Pham =

American attorney (born 1973)

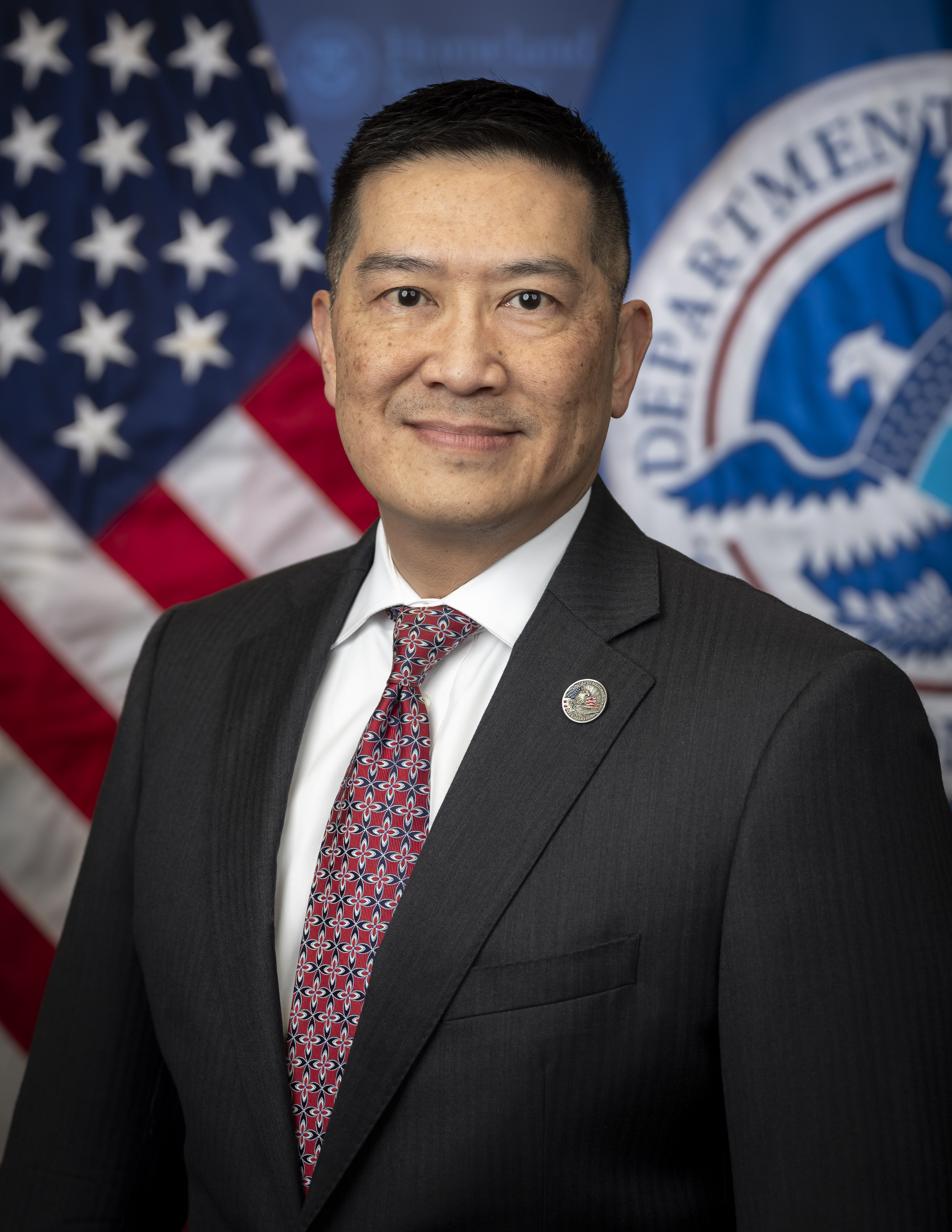
- Official portrait, 2025

Acting Director of U.S. Immigration and Customs Enforcement
- In office August 25, 2020 – December 31, 2020
- President: Donald Trump
- Deputy: Derek N. Benner (acting)
- Preceded by: Matthew Albence (acting)
- Succeeded by: Jonathan Fahey (acting)

Personal details
- Born: Tuong Tony Huu Pham; 1973 (age 52–53) South Vietnam
- Party: Republican
- Spouse: Tara Pham (m. 2001)
- Children: 2
- Education: College of William & Mary (BA); University of Richmond (JD)
- Occupation: Lawyer

Tuong Tony Huu Pham (born 1973) is an American attorney who currently serves as the Assistant Secretary for Border and Immigration Policy in the United States Department of Homeland Security’s Office of Strategy, Policy and Plans. He formerly served as Acting Director of U.S. Immigration and Customs Enforcement from August 25, 2020 to December 31, 2020. A Vietnamese refugee, Pham emigrated from Saigon to the United States with his family in 1975, gaining citizenship in 1985. He graduated from the College of William & Mary in 1995 and from University of Richmond School of Law in 1999, becoming a prosecutor and earning awards from the Old Dominion Bar Association and Style Weekly.

Pham ran for public office once, losing the election in 2015. He then became the superintendent for the Virginia Peninsula Regional Jail, creating various programs including an addiction recovery program, an ankle monitor program, and an introduction of tablets which earned him praise from local media outlets. He resigned in December 2019 before becoming the director of ICE. He resigned at the end of the year.

== Biography ==
=== Early life and career ===
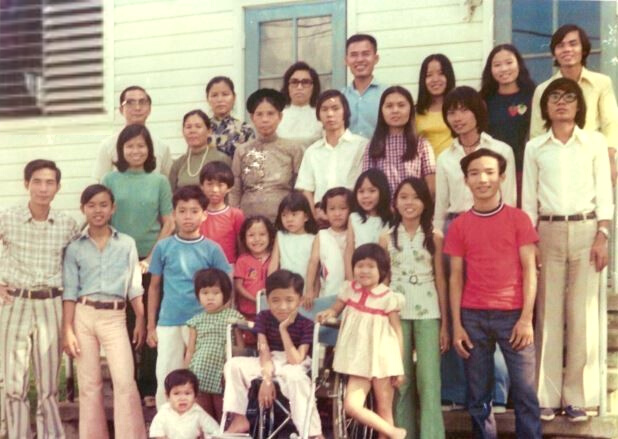
Pham with his family at Fort Chaffee Maneuver Training Center, 1975.

Pham was born in 1973 in what was then South Vietnam. His father was an engineer for the South Vietnamese Army. On April 19, 1975, Pham and his family immigrated to the United States days before the fall of Saigon, with his father being left behind during their evacuation. They were aided by a family friend, an ambassador named John "Jerry" Edwards, who wrote a letter that said that Pham's father was his brother-in-law and a captain, although this was false. They settled at Fort Chaffee Maneuver Training Center, reuniting with their father three months later and moved to Henrico County, Virginia with the help of Commonwealth Catholic Charities. He and his family lived off an apartment off Parham Road, where they struggled to learn English. Both his parents worked minimum wage jobs and stressed to Pham and his siblings to study and work hard. In 1985, after 10 years in America, he became a United States citizen and graduated from Meadowbrook High School in 1991. Pham graduated from the College of William & Mary in 1995 and the University of Richmond School of Law in 1999. He then served as a law clerk in the Circuit Court of Henrico County before becoming a prosecutor in the Richmond Commonwealth’s Attorney’s Office.

In 2009, Pham was recognized as one of Richmond's "Top 40 Under 40. One year later, he was selected as one of Virginia Lawyers Weekly’s “Leaders in the Law” for his leadership in criminal law and the Asian American community. He has further been recognized in 2011 and 2012 as one Virginia Business’s "Legal Elite in Criminal Law." After being awarded, Pham was selected by the Supreme Court of Virginia to serve on the Virginia State Bar Disciplinary Board, the first ever Asian American attorney appointed to this position. He then served as a faculty of the Harry L. Carrico Professionalism Course on behalf of the Bar. In 2010, Pham was appointed to the Virginia Asian Advisory Board by Governor Tim Kaine, being reappointed by Bob McDonnell in 2014. In 2013, he sought to fill the vacancy in the Three Chopt District School Board, saying that he wanted to be "part of the process of ensuring a quality education not only for my children, but all children."

=== 2015 Henrico County Commonwealth's Attorney campaign ===
On February 23, 2015, Pham announced his candidacy for the Henrico County Commonwealth's Attorney, being the fourth Republican to do so. He sought to replace the incumbent Attorney Shannon Taylor, the only Democratic attorney in the race. After the primary, a faulty report from the Pinchbeck Precinct was fixed, giving Pham the lead over the other nominees. Pham was declared the winner the week after, winning by 67 votes, and was endorsed by the Henrico School Board. Pham lost to Taylor with a 12.41% difference in the general election.

=== Superintendent for the Virginia Peninsula Regional Jail ===
In 2017, Pham became the superintendent for the Virginia Peninsula Regional Jail after the previous superintendent, John Kuplinski, resigned from the post. In 2019, Pham introduced various programs and reforms in the jail. An addiction recovery program, introduced in early 2019, empowered inmates with substance abuse disorders so that they could re-enter society, with Virginia Secretary of Public Safety Brian Moran calling it "an example that should be shared among other jails across the state." An ankle monitoring program, introduced months after, allowed inmates to be at home, at work, and visit the jail. In April 2019, Pham introduced tablet computers to the jail, which allowed inmates to have video calls with their families.

During his time as superintendent, the VPRJ was sued by former inmates accusing the jail of failing to keep the women safe. They also sued Kuplinski, Vice Chairman J. Randall Wheeler and former corrections officer Henry Rhim, the latter had been convicted for sexually assaulting two inmates. With the accusations, Pham started an internal investigations unit to review and report findings to him, as well as instituting stronger segregation between men and women. There was also an incident where a female inmate claimed that, during detoxification, she and other inmates were "treated worse than animals," although Pham disputed the story.

In December 2019, Pham announced that he would be resigning from the post at the end of the year to spend time with his family.

=== U.S. Immigration and Customs Enforcement ===
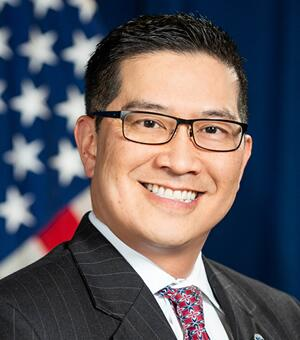
Pham's photo portrait as acting ICE director.

On January 24, 2020, Pham became the Principal Legal Advisor for the U.S. Immigration and Customs Enforcement under Acting Director Matthew Albence. In August 2020, Pham was appointed by President Donald Trump to replace Albence after he resigned, becoming the first Asian-American and Vietnamese person in the office. The agency's first few weeks under Pham saw 128 undocumented immigrants detained in California as a part of Operation Rise, an initiative that was criticized for targeting sanctuary cities. He was also criticized for signing off on erecting controversial billboards in Pennsylvania as well as conducting arrests in Minneapolis–Saint Paul.

Many Asian Americans expressed disappointment that Pham would become the director of ICE, criticizing him for deporting immigrants while being an immigrant himself. Philippa Hughes, Pham's cousin, published several op-ed's that criticized Pham and questioned his claim that he had a "lawful path to citizenship." Other groups, like the Organization of Chinese Americans, were hopeful that because of Pham being an immigrant, that he would have reforms in the agency. The announcement of Pham's appointment also triggered protests against him. Some protesters gathered at Pham's home in Henrico, with some protesters, including a Philadelphia woman, were charged for entering the property. Some called for attorney Shannon Taylor to release the protesters, while Pham reacted by saying that he understood the frustration but condemned the manner of the protest.

In December 2020, Pham announced that he would be resigning from the post at the end of the year to be with his family. The departure came five months after he replaced Albence, with Pham thanking Trump for the opportunity. With his resignation, two advocacy groups claimed that he would be remembered for his "gross abuse of power" with "little regard for our refugee and immigrant communities’ health and safety during a global pandemic."

In February 2025, Pham returned to DHS as Assistant Secretary for Border and Immigration Policy in the Department of Homeland Security’s Office of Strategy, Policy and Plans.

== Personal life ==
In 1999, he was initiated into the Upsilon Nu chapter of Omega Psi Phi fraternity.

== Electoral history ==
Results of the 2015 Commonwealth's Attorney election in Henrico County. Taylor: 50–60%; 60–70%; 70–80%; 80–90%; Pham: 50–60%; 60–70%

2015 Henrico County Commonwealth's Attorney – Republican Primary
Party	Candidate	Votes	%
Republican	Tony Pham	7,381	40.83%
Republican	Jeffrey L. Everhart	7,314	40.46%
Republican	Shannon Dillon	3,382	18.71%

2015 Henrico County Commonwealth's Attorney election
Party	Candidate	Votes	%
Democratic	Shannon Taylor	35,020	56.10%
Republican	Tony Pham	27,272	43.69%

Government offices
Preceded by Matthew Albence; Acting	Director of the U.S. Immigration and Customs Enforcement; Acting; 2020	Succeeded by Jonathan Fahey; Acting
