= Chip Dicks =

American politician

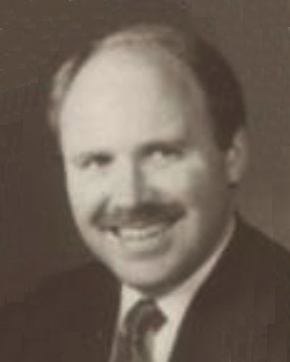
- Official portrait, 1988

Member of the Virginia House of Delegates from the 66th district
- In office January 12, 1983 – January 10, 1990
- Preceded by: Robert E. Russell (Note: In the 1981 case Cosner v. Dalton, a challenge to the General Assembly's decennial apportionment plan, the U.S. District Court for the Eastern District of Virginia ruled that the multi-member districts drawn by the legislature violated the Equal Protection Clause of the Fourteenth Amendment to the U.S. Constitution; while allowing that year's state house elections to proceed, as planned, they ordered that those elected serve a one-year term only and that new elections be held in 1982 under a court-approved redistricting scheme. Russell, a Republican, was elected in 1981 to represent the 34th district, alongside George W. Jones and John Watkins. In 1982, he won his party's nomination for the newly established 66th district seat but lost to Dicks.)
- Succeeded by: Kirk Cox

Personal details
- Born: John Gaudry Dicks III; May 22, 1951 (age 75) Petersburg, Virginia, U.S.
- Party: Democratic
- Education: Methodist College (BA); Stetson University (JD)
- Occupation: Lawyer; politician; lobbyist

John Gaudry "Chip" Dicks III (born May 22, 1951) is an American lobbyist and former Democratic member of the Virginia House of Delegates, serving from 1983 to 1990. He was defeated for reelection in 1989 by Republican Kirk Cox.

== Electoral history ==
Date	Election	Candidate	Party	Votes	%
Virginia House of Delegates, 66th district
Nov 2, 1982	General	John G. Dicks, III	Democratic	6,953	50.37
Nov 2, 1982	General	Robert E. Russell	Republican	6,851	49.63
Nov 2, 1982	General	Write Ins		0	0.00
Nov 2, 1982	General	Single-member districts created per ruling in Cosner v. Dalton			
Nov 8, 1983	General	John G. Dicks, III	Democratic	7,777	62.11
Nov 8, 1983	General	Judy S. Tap	Republican	4,739	37.84
Nov 8, 1983	General	Write Ins		6	0.05
Nov 5, 1985	General	John G. Dicks, III	Democratic	11,492	99.90
Nov 5, 1985	General	Write Ins		11	0.10
Nov 3, 1987	General	John G. Dicks, III	Democratic	13,567	99.85
Nov 3, 1987	General	Write Ins		20	0.15
Nov 7, 1989	General	M. Kirkland Cox	Republican	10,460	52.47
Nov 7, 1989	General	John G. Dicks, III	Democratic	9,468	47.49
Nov 7, 1989	General	Write Ins		8	0.04

== Notes ==
Virginia House of Delegates
Preceded by None	Virginia Delegate for the 66th District; 1983–1990	Succeeded by Kirk Cox
