= Bill Axselle =

American lawyer and politician (1943–2019)

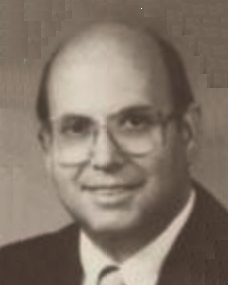
- Official portrait, 1988

Member of the Virginia House of Delegates
- In office January 9, 1974 – January 10, 1990
- Preceded by: T. Dix Sutton
- Succeeded by: Jack Reid
- Constituency: 34th district (1974‍–‍1982); 32nd district (1982‍–‍1983); 72nd district (1983‍–‍1990)

Personal details
- Born: Ralph Lewis Axselle Jr. February 27, 1943 Richmond, Virginia, U.S.
- Died: January 24, 2019 (aged 75) Goochland, Virginia, U.S.
- Party: Democratic
- Spouse: Anne Elizabeth Maiden (m. 1964)
- Education: University of North Carolina at Chapel Hill (BS); University of Richmond (LLB)
- Occupation: Lawyer; politician

Ralph Lewis "Bill" Axselle Jr. (February 27, 1943 – January 24, 2019) was an American lawyer and politician who served as a member of the Virginia House of Delegates from 1974 until 1990. After retiring from the legislature, he worked for nearly 30 years as a lobbyist for Williams Mullen. He attended the University of North Carolina at Chapel Hill, where he played football, and the University of Richmond School of Law.
