= Shannon Taylor (politician) =

American attorney and politician

- Taylor in 2026

Member-elect of the U.S. House of Representatives from Virginia's 1st district
- Assuming office January 3, 2027
- Succeeding: Rob Wittman

Commonwealth's Attorney for Henrico County
- Incumbent
- Assumed office January 1, 2012
- Preceded by: Wade Kizer

Personal details
- Born: November 17, 1967 (age 59) Charlottesville, Virginia, U.S.
- Party: Democratic
- Education: University of Virginia (BA); University of Richmond (JD)
- Website: Campaign website

Shannon Leigh Taylor (born November 17, 1967) is an American politician, attorney, and prosecutor serving as the commonwealth's attorney for Henrico County, Virginia since 2012. A member of the Democratic Party, she is the U.S. representative-elect for Virginia's 1st congressional district after defeating incumbent Republican Representative Rob Wittman in the 2026 midterm elections.

== Early life and education ==
Taylor was born and raised in Charlottesville, Virginia and is an alumnus of Albemarle High School. She graduated from the University of Virginia in 1989 and earned her Juris Doctor degree from the University of Richmond School of Law in 1995.

== Henrico County Commonwealth's Attorney ==
=== Elections ===
On August 11, 2011, Taylor announced her candidacy for the 2011 Henrico County Commonwealth's Attorney election with only 11 weeks to go before the election. The office was an open contest as the incumbent, Wade A. Kizer, announced that he would be suspending his candidacy for his fifth term. Her opponent was attorney Matthew Geary, who was a law school classmate and had been campaigning since 2009, and later Bill Janis, who announced his campaign days later.

Taylor won an upset victory over both, receiving 25,975 votes while Janis received 21,540 votes and Geary received 9,045 votes. Some, including Taylor, attributed the win to the split Republican votes between Geary and Janis. Taylor is the first woman to hold the position in Henrico County.

Taylor planned to make the office more diverse and to create cooperation between the office and police. In 2015, Taylor announced that she would be running for a second term, remaining unopposed in the Democratic primary. She faced prosecutor Tony Pham, who won the Republican primary against Jeffrey Lee Everhart and Shannon Dillon. Pham took aim at Taylor's leadership but ultimately lost in the general election.

Taylor ran for a third term in 2019, facing against Owen Inge Conway, a lawyer she fired when she initially took office. Taylor won against Conway with 62.68% of the vote.

Taylor currently serves as President of the Virginia Association of Commonwealth's Attorneys.

=== Appointment of special prosecutor ===
In 2013, Taylor released a statement that she had requested the judge to appoint a special prosecutor to the case involving politician Joe Morrissey and his sexual relationship with a minor. Taylor thought that in order for the public to have complete confidence and trust in the proceedings, it was appropriate for decisions to be made by someone outside of Henrico County and that had no prior relationships with the individuals potentially involved.

In 2016, Morrissey exposed himself to a legal client. Taylor began an investigation and later said that although Morrissey was "wrong and unethical" he would not be charged.

=== Police integrity ===
In June 2020, Taylor announced that her office would add a new deputy for police integrity to review police use of force accusations, investigate and review body-worn camera footage, and help determine whether charges are appropriate. She created it in response to the murder of George Floyd the previous month, and began looking for a deputy to fill the office. She appointed attorney Misty Whitehead, a Black Lives Matter supporter, to fill the position, but had funding pulled by County Manager John Vithoulkas after taking issue with private defense attorney Misty Whitehead's social media posts, which included comments about the Breonna Taylor case; questioning her ability – and objectivity – to serve in the role.

=== Prosecution of Ku Klux Klan leader ===
On June 7, 2020, a man drove his truck into a crowd of peaceful protesters in Henrico. The perpetrator was an admitted leader of the Ku Klux Klan. Taylor announced charges of assault, battery, attempted malicious wounding, and felony vandalism. He was found guilty and sentenced to six years in prison.

=== Campaign for Attorney General ===
In 2020, there was widespread speculation that Taylor would file a candidacy for the 2021 Virginia Attorney General election. In December 2020, Taylor released a statement that she would not run for attorney general that year. In January 2021, she announced that she would endorse Mark Herring, the incumbent attorney general.

On June 19th, 2024, Taylor announced her candidacy for the 2025 Virginia Attorney General election. In April 2025, Taylor's campaign reported over $1 million in donations. She ultimately narrowly lost the June 2025 primary to Jay Jones.

== 2026 United States House of Representatives campaign ==
In September 2025, Taylor announced her candidacy for the United States House of Representatives seat in Virginia's 1st congressional district in the 2026 midterm elections. She had initially announced her campaign for Virginia's 5th congressional district which had been redrawn after a statewide referendum approved the 2026 Virginia redistricting amendment. After the Supreme Court of Virginia struck down the amendment, Taylor switched her campaign to the 1st district.

On August 4, 2026, Taylor won a majority in the Democratic primary against six other candidates making her the Democratic nominee against incumbent Rob Wittman. She was endorsed in the primary by the Democratic Congressional Campaign Committee, Governor Abigail Spanberger and Virginia's senators, Mark Warner and Tim Kaine.

On November 3, 2026, Taylor flipped Virginia's 1st congressional district defeating Rob Wittman, who held the seat for nearly two decades. She is also the first Democrat to win the seat since 1977.

== Electoral history ==
2011 Henrico County Commonwealth's Attorney election
Party	Candidate	Votes	%
Democratic	Shannon Taylor	25,975	45.85%
Independent	Bill Janis	21,540	38.02%
Republican	Matthew Geary	9,045	15.97%

2015 Henrico County Commonwealth's Attorney election
Party	Candidate	Votes	%
Democratic	Shannon Taylor	35,020	56.10%
Republican	Tony Pham	27,272	43.69%

2019 Henrico County Commonwealth's Attorney election
Party	Candidate	Votes	%
Democratic	Shannon Taylor	65,296	62.68%
Republican	Owen Conway	38,582	37.03%

2023 Henrico County Commonwealth's Attorney election
Party	Candidate	Votes	%
Democratic	Shannon Taylor	66,928	61.72%
Republican	Shannon L. Dillon	41,119	37.92%

2025 Virginia Attorney General Democratic primary
Party	Candidate	Votes	%
Democratic	Jay Jones	252,976	51.11%
Democratic	Shannon Taylor	241,969	48.89%
Total votes		494,945	100.00%

2026 United States House of Representatives VA-01 Democratic Primary
Party	Candidate	Votes	%
Democratic	Shannon Taylor	24,912	53.1
Democratic	Salaam Bhatti	9,223	19.7
Democratic	Jason Knapp	4,695	10.0
Democratic	Elizabeth Dempsey Beggs	3,351	7.1
Democratic	Mel Tull	2,016	4.3
Democratic	Tim Cywinski	1,402	3.0
Democratic	Ericka Kopp	1,307	2.8
Total votes		46,906	100.0

U.S. House of Representatives
Preceded by Rob Wittman	Member of the U.S. House of Representatives from Virginia's 1st congressional district Taking office 2027	Elect
