= Peter Farrell =

Peter Farrell may refer to:

- Peter Farrell (Irish footballer) (1922–1999), Irish footballer for, among others, Shamrock Rovers, Everton and Tranmere Rovers
- Peter Farrell (English footballer) (born 1957), English former football midfielder, played for, among others, Bury, Port Vale and Rochdale; later a manager
- Peter Farrell (politician) (born 1983), American politician in the Virginia House of Delegates
- Peter T. Farrell (1900–1992), American judge from Queens, New York City
