= Juanita Jo Matkins =

Juanita Jo Matkins is a retired American educator who ran for the Virginia House of Delegates' 56th district in 2019. The 56th district includes all of Louisa County and parts of Goochland, Henrico, and Spotsylvania Counties.

== Biography ==
Matkins is a former teacher and professor. She educated the youth of Louisa in Louisa County Public Schools as well as Piedmont Christian School She was also a professor of science education at the College of William and Mary. She is the organist at Yanceyville Christian Church in Louisa County. Additionally, she is active with the Louisa NAACP.

Matkins outraised her opponent in the first two fundraising periods. On November 5, 2019, Republican incumbent John McGuire defeated Matkins, winning 61% to her 39%.
