= Schuyler VanValkenburg =

American politician (born 1982)

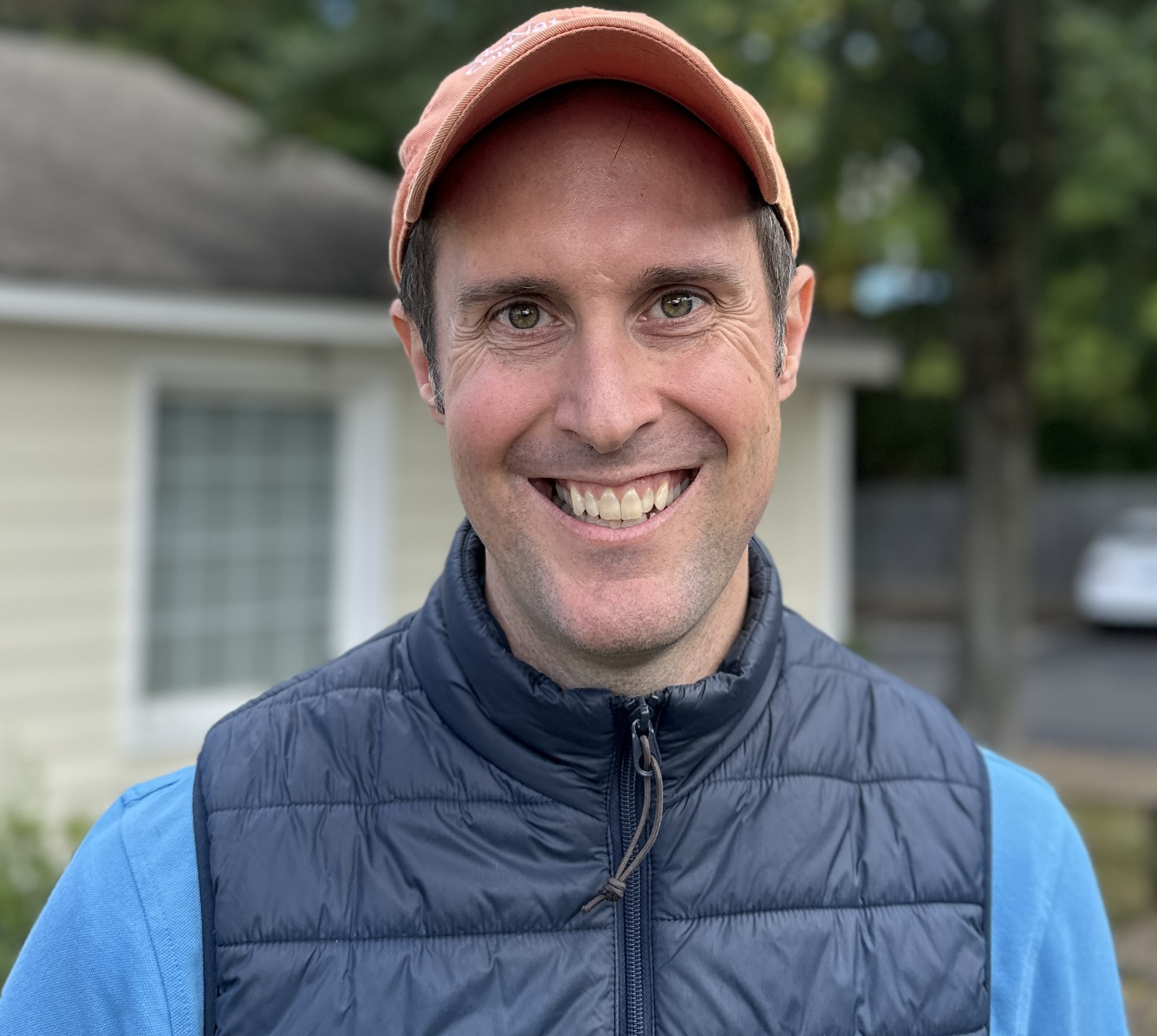
- VanValkenburg in 2023

Member of the Virginia Senate from the 16th district
- Incumbent
- Assumed office January 10, 2024
- Preceded by: Siobhan Dunnavant

Member of the Virginia House of Delegates from the 72nd district
- In office January 18, 2018 – January 10, 2024
- Preceded by: Jimmie Massie
- Succeeded by: Destiny Levere Bolling (redistricted)

Personal details
- Born: Schuyler Thomas VanValkenburg; 1982 (age 43–44) Johnstown, New York, U.S.
- Party: Democratic
- Education: University of Richmond (BA); Virginia Commonwealth University (MA)

Schuyler Thomas VanValkenburg (born 1982) is an American teacher and politician. He was elected to the Virginia House of Delegates representing the 72nd District on November 7, 2017, to replace retiring delegate Jimmie Massie. He defeated Republicans Eddie Whitlock and GayDonna Vandergriff in the 2017 and 2019 elections, respectively. In the 2023 state elections, VanValkenburg was elected over incumbent Siobhan Dunnavant in the newly redrawn 16th District. The race was considered highly competitive for control of the Virginia Senate.

== Career ==
VanValkenburg taught at Short Pump Middle School and continues to teach at Glen Allen High School after his election to the Virginia Senate, working as a part-time legislator. A Democrat, he defeated Republican lawyer Edward Whitlock III in 2017 as part of a Democratic wave in Virginia.

=== Committee assignments ===
- Education
- Privileges & Elections

== Political positions ==
=== Gambling ===
In January 2024, VanValkenburg filed a bill to legalize betting on college sports. VanValkenburg stated that legalizing and regulating gambling would increase safety, saying "You can ban it, but people are still going to do it."

=== Housing ===
In 2026, VanValkenburg sponsored a "housing near jobs" bill to allow by-right zoning for apartment buildings, townhomes, and mixed-use developments in commercial districts and filed a bill to allow manufactured homes to be placed in any residential zoning district that allows traditional site-built housing.

=== Labor ===
In 2020, VanValkenburg filed a bill to ban non-compete clauses for "low-wage" workers, which was signed into law by Governor Ralph Northam. In 2022, VanValkenburg introduced a bill to ban non-competes for health care workers, which failed to pass.

=== Legal reform ===
In 2020, VanValkenburg introduced a bill expand Virginia's anti-strategic lawsuit against public participation (SLAPP) laws. VanValkenburg's bill came after SLAPP lawsuits that may have been dismissed under California's more stringent laws were filed by actor Johnny Depp and California congressman Devin Nunes in Virginia. The bill, modeled after California's, would allow defendants in defamation cases to file motions to dismiss potentially-frivolous defamation suits earlier in the process and recover attorney fees if successful.

=== Redistricting ===
In 2020, VanValkenburg sponsored a bill to amend the Virginia constitution and establish an independent commission for redistricting congressional and state legislative districts with the aim of curbing partisan gerrymandering. The measure passed the General Assembly and became law after passing a ballot measure in November 2020.

In October 2025, VanValkenburg supported a bill to amend the Virginia constitution to allow the Virginia General Assembly to redraw Virginia congressional districts mid-decade after multiple Republican-led states redrew congressional districts to benefit the Republican Party. VanValkenburg stated that the amendment was a proportional response to "opportunistic, mid-decade redistricting" encouraged by the Trump administration.

== Electoral history ==
Date	Election	Candidate	Party	Votes	%
Virginia House of Delegates, 72nd district
Nov 7, 2017	General	Schuyler VanValkenburg	Democratic	16,655	52.71%
Nov 7, 2017	General	Eddie Whitlock	Republican	14,869	47.06%
Nov 5, 2019	General	Schuyler VanValkenburg	Democratic	16,345	53.26%
Nov 5, 2019	General	GayDonna Vandergriff	Republican	14,312	46.63%
Nov 2, 2021	General	Schuyler VanValkenburg	Democratic	19,710	53.00%
Nov 2, 2021	General	Christopher Holmes	Republican	17,427	46.08%
Virginia Senate, 16th district
Nov 7, 2023	General	Schuyler VanValkenburg	Democratic	44,803	54.66%
Nov 7, 2023	General	Siobhan Dunnavant	Republican	37,000	45.14%
