= Walter Stosch =

American politician (born 1936)

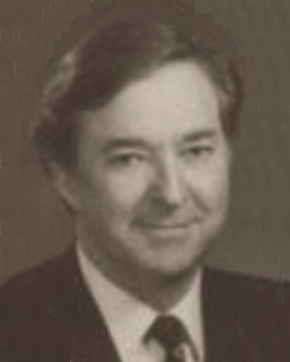
- Stosch in 1988

President pro tempore of the Virginia Senate
- In office June 23, 2014 – January 13, 2016
- Preceded by: Charles Colgan
- Succeeded by: Stephen Newman
- In office January 12, 2012 – January 28, 2014
- Preceded by: Charles Colgan
- Succeeded by: Charles Colgan

Member of the Virginia Senate from the 12th district
- In office January 8, 1992 – January 13, 2016
- Preceded by: Eddy Dalton
- Succeeded by: Siobhan Dunnavant

Member of the Virginia House of Delegates from the 73rd district
- In office January 12, 1983 – January 8, 1992
- Preceded by: Robison B. James
- Succeeded by: Eric Cantor

Personal details
- Born: Walter Allen Stosch; August 18, 1936 (age 90) Fredericksburg, Virginia, U.S.
- Party: Republican
- Spouse: Eleanor Herbert
- Children: 2
- Education: University of Richmond (BS, MBA)
- Website: Official website

Military service
- Branch/service: United States Army
- Years of service: 1953–1956

Walter Allen Stosch (born August 18, 1936) is an American politician in the Republican Party.

== Early life and education ==
Stosch was born on August 18, 1936, in Fredericksburg, Virginia, and raised in the Northern Neck of Virginia.

He served in the United States Army from 1953–56, then attended the University of Richmond, where he received a BS degree in accounting in 1959. He passed the Certified Public Accountant exam and began practice in Richmond. In 1984, he received an MBA degree from the same school.

He was also an adjunct professor at both Richmond and Virginia Commonwealth University.

== Career ==
He served in the Virginia House of Delegates from 1983 until 1992, when he was elected to the Senate of Virginia. He was the Majority leader 1998–2007, after which he was named Republican Leader Emeritus. He served as the President Pro Tempore of the Senate for his final term, except for a six-month period when Democrats controlled the chamber. He represented the 12th district, made up of parts of Hanover and Henrico Counties. In 2009, responding to the request of constituent Em Bowles Locker Alsop, Stosch sponsored a monument to Virginia women in Capitol Square, which became law in 2010, and was unveiled in October 2018.

== Personal life ==
He married Eleanor Herbert. They had two children, David and Karen, and four grandchildren, Sarah Stosch Stewart, Ashley Watson, Kelly Stosch Chaffin, and Brian Watson.
