= Alex McMurtrie Jr. =

American politician

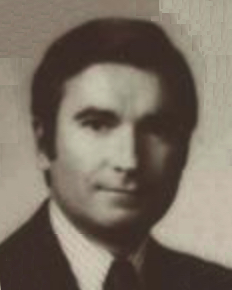

Member of the Virginia House of Delegates from the 36th district
- In office January 12, 1972 – January 13, 1982 Serving with George W. Jones
- Preceded by: Frederick T. Gray
- Succeeded by: John Watkins (Note: Watkins defeated McMurtrie to represent the 34th district, newly redrawn under the General Assembly's decennial apportionment plan.)

Personal details
- Born: October 5, 1935 (age 90) Richmond, Virginia, U.S.
- Party: Democratic
- Spouse: Margaret Hillenbrand
- Education: University of Notre Dame (BS); Georgetown University (LLB)
- Occupation: Lawyer; politician

Alexander Benedict McMurtrie Jr. (born October 5, 1935) is an American lawyer and politician who served in the Virginia House of Delegates from 1972 to 1982. After losing his 1981 reelection bid, McMurtrie has run five campaigns for state senate, seeking the 10th district seat in 1991 and 2015 and the 11th district seat in 1994, 1999, and 2007.
