= Glen Sturtevant =

American politician from Virginia (born 1982)

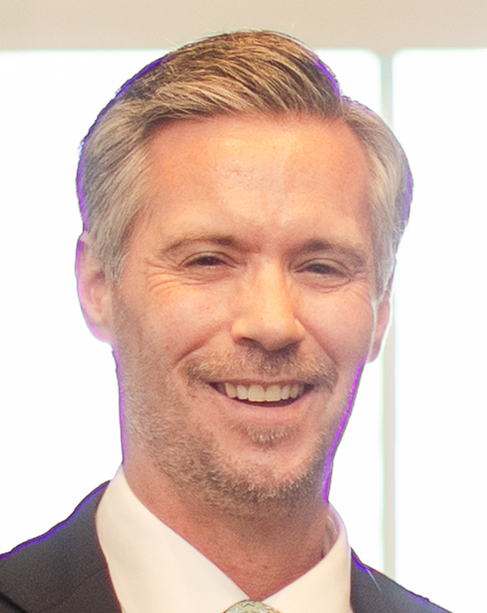
- Sturtevant in 2024

Member of the Virginia Senate
- Incumbent
- Assumed office January 10, 2024
- Preceded by: Siobhan Dunnavant (Redistricting)
- Constituency: 12th District
- In office January 13, 2016 – January 8, 2020
- Preceded by: John Watkins
- Succeeded by: Ghazala Hashmi
- Constituency: 10th District

Personal details
- Born: September 14, 1982 (age 44) Wilmington, Delaware, U.S.
- Party: Republican
- Spouse: Lori Cochrane
- Children: 4
- Education: Catholic University (BA); George Mason University (JD)
- Website: www.glensturtevant.com

Glen Howard Sturtevant Jr. (born September 14, 1982) is an American politician serving as a Republican member of the Senate of Virginiarepresenting the 10th district since 2024. Previously, he represented the 12th district from 2016 to 2020. In 2019, he lost to Democratic nominee Ghazala Hasami in the general election.

Born in Wilmington, Delaware, Sturtevant graduated with a B.A. from the Catholic University of America in Washington, D.C. and from George Mason Law School.

Sturtevant is an active member of the Virginia State Bar. From 2012 until his election to the state senate, Sturtevant served on the Richmond School Board.

In 2023, Sturtevant won the Republican nomination for State Senate in the newly redrawn 12th district, defeating incumbent Amanda Chase and another challenger Tina Ramirez.

== Electoral history ==
=== 2015 ===
Date	Election	Candidate	Party	Votes	%
Virginia Senate, 10th district
Nov 3, 2015	General	Glen H. Sturtevant Jr.	Republican	27,651	49.79
Nov 3, 2015	General	Daniel A. Gecker	Democratic	26,173	47.13
Nov 3, 2015	General	Marleen K. Durfee	Independent	1,136	2.05
Nov 3, 2015	General	Carl R. Loser	Libertarian	527	0.95
Nov 3, 2015	General	Write Ins		44	0.08
Nov 3, 2015	General	John Watkins did not seek reelection; seat stayed Republican			

=== 2019 ===
Date	Election	Candidate	Party	Votes	%
Virginia Senate, 10th district
November 5, 2019	General	Glen H. Sturtevant Jr.	Republican	36,811	45.60
November 5, 2019	General	Ghazala Hashmi	Democratic	43,806	54.30
November 5, 2019	General	Write Ins		49	0.01
November 5, 2019	General		Democratic gain from Republican		

=== 2023 ===
Date	Election	Candidate	Party	Votes	%
Virginia Senate, 12th district
June 20, 2023	Primary	Glen H. Sturtevant Jr.	Republican	8,833	39.9
June 20, 2023	Primary	Amanda Chase	Republican	8,367	37.8
June 20, 2023	Primary	Tina Ramirez	Republican	4,956	22.4

Date	Election	Candidate	Party	Votes	%
Virginia Senate, 12th district
November 7, 2023	General	Glen H. Sturtevant Jr.	Republican	44,597	54.7
November 7, 2023	General	Natan McKenzie	Democratic	36,689	45.0
November 7, 2023	General	Other/Write Ins		213	0.3
November 7, 2023	General		Republican hold		

Senate of Virginia
Preceded by John Watkins	Member of the Virginia Senate from the 10th district 2016–2020	Succeeded by Ghazala Hashmi
Preceded by Siobhan Dunnavant	Member of the Virginia Senate from the 12th district 2024–Present	Incumbent
