= Lee Ware =

American politician (born 1952)

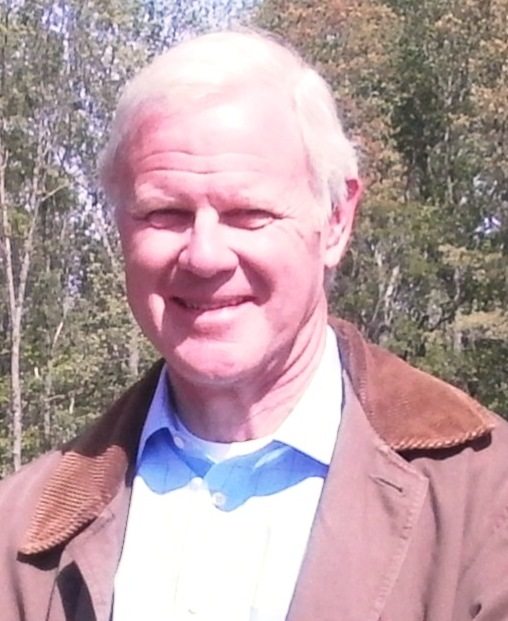
- Ware in 2013

Member of the Virginia House of Delegates
- Incumbent
- Assumed office January 16, 1998
- Preceded by: John Watkins
- Constituency: 65th district (1998–2024); 72nd district (2024–present)

Personal details
- Born: Robert Lee Ware Jr. August 20, 1952 (age 73) Fitchburg, Massachusetts, U.S.
- Party: Republican
- Spouse: Kathleen Annette Nulton
- Children: 4
- Education: Wheaton College (BA)
- Occupation: Educator; politician
- Website: www.delegateleeware.net

Robert Lee Ware Jr. (born August 20, 1952) is an American politician representing Virginia's 72nd House of Delegates district. He was first elected to the Virginia House of Delegates in 1998, representing the 65th district. He is a member of the Republican Party.

== Life, education, and career ==
Ware was born in Fitchburg, Massachusetts. He received a B.A. degree in history and literature from Wheaton College in 1974 and pursued graduate studies in the same subjects at Harvard University, Asbury Seminary, Northeastern University, Longwood University, and Virginia Commonwealth University.

Ware moved to Powhatan, Virginia as editor of the weekly newspaper the Powhatan Gazette, where he worked between 1981-1984.

Starting in 1984, Ware taught history and government at Powhatan High School for 15 years. He later taught at Blessed Sacrament Huguenot Academy. In 2012 he became academic dean of Benedictine College Preparatory School until his retirement in 2014. Ware is a Roman Catholic and has four children: Karen, Rob, Thomas, and Jeb.

Ware has also served on numerous commissions as well as state-level boards, notably including the Virginia State Board of Education and the Jamestown-Yorktown Foundation Board of Trustees.

== Positions and appointments ==
Ware has served on the House committees on:

- Agriculture (1998–2001)
- Chesapeake and Natural Resources (2002–present)
- Claims (1998–1999)
- Commerce and Labor (2002–present)
- Conservation and Natural Resources (1998–2001)
- Corporations
- Insurance and Banking (1998–2001)
- Finance (2001–present), formerly as Chair
- Militia and Police (2000–2001)
- Militia
- Police and Public Safety (2002–2003)
- Mining and Mineral Resources (1998–2000)
- Rules (2010–present)

== Opposition to selective ban on Sunday hunting ==
Ware has historically opposed efforts to lift Virginia's selective ban on Sunday hunting. In 2014, the General Assembly passed and the Governor signed legislation to permit hunting on Sunday allowing private property owners to choose for their own property, not within 200 yards of church, and no use of hunting deer with hounds. This victory was passed by large margin of 71 in favor and the minority at 27 against.

== Electoral history ==
Ware served two terms on the Powhatan County Board of Supervisors, 1988–1996. He was board chairman for one year.

On December 17, 1997, state Senator Joseph B. Benedetti resigned his seat to accept Governor-elect Jim Gilmore's offer to become head of the state Department of Criminal Justice Services. 65th district Delegate John Watkins was chosen to succeed Benedetti in a special election on January 6, 1998. On January 13, the day before the Virginia General Assembly convened, Ware won a special election to replace Watkins. He was sworn in three days later.

He has retained the delegate position since 1998, receiving greater than 70% of the vote in each election until 2013 (including multiple uncontested elections), when Michael P. "Mike" Asip won a over third of the votes in the 2019 general election. After another uncontested election in 2015, Ware has faced similar opposition each election, though he has still enjoyed a margin of victory of at least 25 percentage points each time.

Date	Election	Candidate	Party	Votes	%
Virginia House of Delegates, 65th district
January 13, 1998	Special	R. Lee Ware Jr.	Republican	7,479	65.42
January 13, 1998	Special	Edward B. Barber	Democratic	3,550	31.05
January 13, 1998	Special	Jeffrey M. Keegan	Independent	396	3.46
January 13, 1998	Special	Write Ins		8	0.07
November 2, 1999	General	R. Lee Ware Jr.	Republican	10,183	77.07
November 2, 1999	General	Timothy R. Belton	Independent	3,016	22.83
November 2, 1999	General	Write Ins		13	0.10
November 6, 2001	General	R. Lee Ware Jr.	Republican	18,851	74.93
November 6, 2001	General	Christine K. Lowrie	Democratic	5,802	23.06
November 6, 2001	General	John H. Girardeau III	Libertarian	498	1.98
November 6, 2001	General	Write Ins		7	0.03
November 4, 2003	General	R. Lee Ware Jr.	Republican	10,131	75.12
November 4, 2003	General	Robert E. Williams	Democratic	3,351	24.85
November 4, 2003	General	Write Ins		4	0.03
November 8, 2005	General	R. Lee Ware Jr.	Republican	23,851	96.88
November 8, 2005	General	Write Ins		768	3.12
November 6, 2007	General	R. Lee Ware Jr.	Republican	14,944	98.02
November 6, 2007	General	Write Ins		301	1.97
November 3, 2009	General	R. Lee Ware Jr.	Republican	21,887	71.46
November 3, 2009	General	Gary R. Reinhardt	Independent	8,682	28.34
November 3, 2009	General	Write Ins		56	0.18
November 8, 2011	General	R. Lee Ware Jr.	Republican	14,991	97.59
November 8, 2011	General	Write Ins		369	2.40
November 5, 2013	General	R. Lee Ware Jr.	Republican	19,839	67.60
November 5, 2013	General	William E. Quarles Jr.	Democratic	9,431	32.14
November 5, 2013	General	Write Ins		76	0.26
November 3, 2015	General	R. Lee Ware Jr.	Republican	19,842	97.31
November 3, 2015	General	Write Ins		548	2.69
November 7, 2017	General	R. Lee Ware Jr.	Republican	22,394	64.01
November 7, 2017	General	Francis M. Stevens	Democratic	12,530	35.82
November 7, 2017	General	Write Ins		59	0.17
November 5, 2019	General	R. Lee Ware Jr.	Republican	24,710	65.07
November 5, 2019	General	Michael P. "Mike" Asip	Democratic	13,247	34.89
November 5, 2019	General	Write Ins		16	0.04
November 7, 2023	General	R. Lee Ware Jr.	Republican	22,684	68.05
November 7, 2023	General	Bilal Z. Raychouni	Democratic	10,585	31.76
November 7, 2023	General	Write Ins		64	0.19
November 4, 2025	General	R. Lee Ware Jr.	Republican	27,963	61.53
November 4, 2025	General	Randolph T. Critzer, Jr.	Democratic	16,380	36.08
November 4, 2025	General	Kristin A. Farry	Forward	853	1.88
November 4, 2025	General	Write Ins		203	0.48

== Notes ==
Virginia House of Delegates
Preceded by John Watkins	Member of the Virginia House of Delegates from the 65th district 1998–2024	Succeeded by Joshua G. Cole
Preceded by Schuyler VanValkenburg	Member of the Virginia House of Delegates from the 72nd district 2024–present	Incumbent
