= Siobhan Dunnavant =

American physician and politician (born 1964)

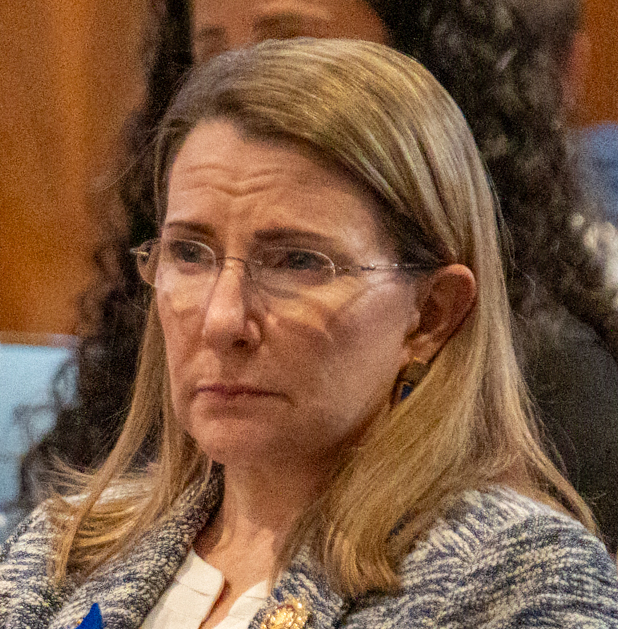
- Dunnavant in 2023

Member of the Virginia Senate from the 12th district
- In office January 13, 2016 – January 10, 2024
- Preceded by: Walter Stosch
- Succeeded by: Schuyler VanValkenburg

Personal details
- Born: Siobhan Marie Stolle; September 12, 1964 (age 62) Norfolk, Virginia, U.S.
- Party: Republican
- Spouse: Lloyd Dunnavant
- Relations: Chris Stolle (brother); Ken Stolle (brother)
- Children: 4
- Education: Randolph College (BS); University of Virginia (BSN); Eastern Virginia Medical School (MD)

Siobhan Stolle Dunnavant (born September 12, 1964) is an American physician and politician who served as a member of the Senate of Virginia from 2016 to 2024. She is the sister of former Delegate Chris Stolle, Virginia Beach Sheriff Ken Stolle, and Virginia Beach Commonwealth Attorney Colin Stolle. She represented Virginia's 12th District, which initially included parts of western Henrico and Hanover counties. Due to recent redistricting, the district is now primarily centered on Chesterfield County.

== Early life and education ==
Dunnavant was born on September 12, 1964, in Norfolk, Virginia. She earned a Bachelor of Science degree from Randolph College and a Bachelor of Nursing from the University of Virginia. After working as a nurse, Dunnavant earned a medical degree from the Eastern Virginia Medical School.

== Career ==
Dunnavant was elected to the Senate of Virginia in November 2015 and assumed office on January 13, 2016. In 2019, Dunnavant was re-elected over Democrat Debra Rodman by a margin of 50.76%-49.06%. After redistricting, in the 2023 election, Delegate Schuyler Van Valkenburg ran against her for the open seat in the newly redrawn 16th District, consisting of western Henrico County. According to results posted by the Virginia Department of Elections after the elections, VanValkenburg defeated Dunnavant, taking approximately 54% of the vote.

Dunnavant practices medicine as an OB-GYN and was the only doctor serving in the Virginia legislature.

== Personal life ==
Dunnavant is married to Lloyd Dunnavant. They have four children together.

Senate of Virginia
Preceded by Walter Stosch	Member of the Virginia Senate from the 12th district 2016–2024	Succeeded by Glen Sturtevant
