= Robert E. Russell =

American politician (1941–2019)

Bob Russell
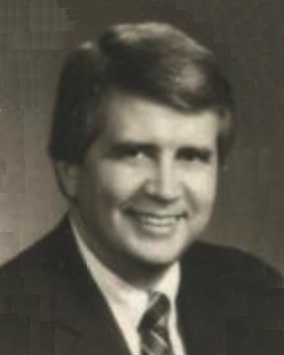
- Official portrait, 1988

Member of the Virginia Senate from the 11th district
- In office January 11, 1984 – January 25, 1994
- Preceded by: Frederick T. Gray
- Succeeded by: Steve Martin

Member of the Virginia House of Delegates from the 34th district
- In office January 13, 1982 – January 12, 1983 Serving with George Jones & John Watkins
- Succeeded by: Chip Dicks

Personal details
- Born: Robert Elson Russell; December 18, 1941 Richmond, Virginia, U.S.
- Died: January 19, 2019 (aged 77)
- Party: Republican
- Spouse: Carole Poole
- Education: Virginia Tech (BEng)

Robert Elson Russell Sr. (December 18, 1941 – January 19, 2019) was an American politician. Elected to the Virginia House of Delegates in 1981, he faced Chip Dicks the following year after the court-mandated redrawing of districts. He was unsuccessful in this race but won election to the Virginia Senate in 1983.

Russell was convicted of embezzling $6,750 from a not for profit cycling club. He was found guilty and sentenced to one year in prison. Since convicted criminals are not allowed to serve in the Virginia Senate, he resigned his seat in 1994.

Virginia House of Delegates
Preceded by Robison B. James	Virginia Delegate for the 34th District; 1982–1983; Served alongside: George W. Jones, John Watkins	Succeeded by Vince Callahan
Senate of Virginia
Preceded by Frederick T. Gray	Virginia Senator for the 11th District; 1984–1994	Succeeded by Steve Martin
