= Kirk Cox =

American politician and former educator (born 1957)

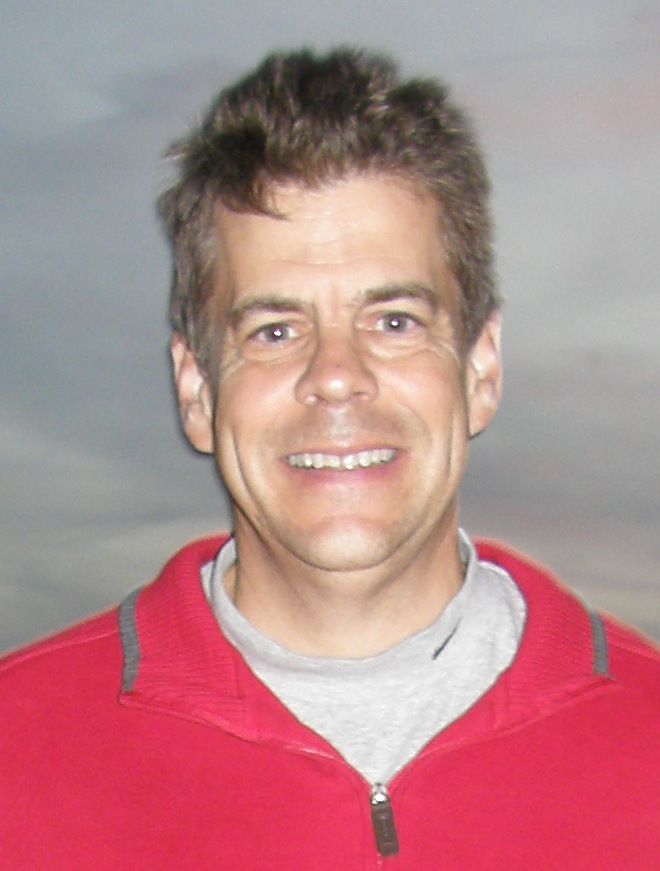

55th Speaker of the Virginia House of Delegates
- In office January 10, 2018 – January 8, 2020
- Preceded by: Bill Howell
- Succeeded by: Eileen Filler-Corn
Other leadership positions
Majority Leader of the Virginia House of Delegates
In office December 5, 2010 – January 10, 2018
Preceded by	Morgan Griffith
Succeeded by	Todd Gilbert

Member of the Virginia House of Delegates from the 66th district
- In office January 10, 1990 – January 12, 2022
- Preceded by: Chip Dicks
- Succeeded by: Mike Cherry

Personal details
- Born: Marvin Kirkland Cox; August 17, 1957 (age 69) Petersburg, Virginia, U.S.
- Party: Republican
- Spouse: Julie Kirkendall
- Children: 4
- Education: Richard Bland College (AS); James Madison University (BS)
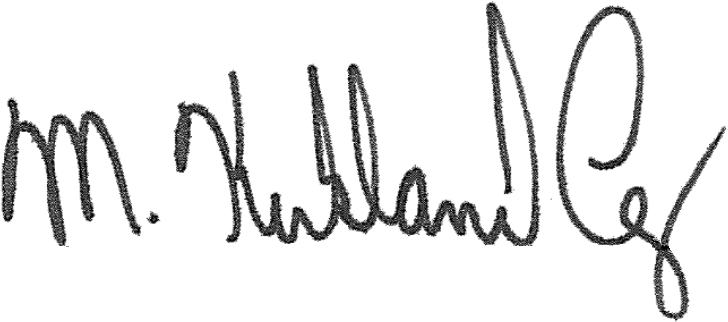
- Signature
- Website: Campaign website

Marvin Kirkland Cox (born August 17, 1957) is an American retired politician and educator. A Republican and a former high school teacher, he served in the Virginia House of Delegates from 1990 to 2022, representing the 66th District. From 2018 to 2020, he served as the 55th Speaker of the House of Delegates. Cox served as House Majority Leader from 2010 to 2018 and House Majority Whip from 2004 to 2010.

In October 2020, Cox filed papers to establish a campaign committee preparing to seek the Republican nomination for Governor of Virginia, but said he would not formally announce until after the November presidential election. On November 17, 2020, Cox formally launched his campaign for governor. On May 11, 2021, he conceded to Glenn Youngkin, after finishing fourth in the Republican convention held on May 8, 2021.

== Early life and education ==
Born in Petersburg, Virginia, Cox graduated from Colonial Heights High School in 1975. After studying political science and social science at James Madison University, he graduated with a Bachelor of Science (BS) in both fields of study in 1979. He pledged with Theta Chi at James Madison University. Cox received an Associate of Science (AS) in Life Science from the Richard Bland College at the College of William & Mary in 1981.

== Political career ==
Kirk Cox was first elected from the 66th District to the House of Delegates in 1989. The 66th House District includes all of Colonial Heights and parts of Chesterfield County.

In 2017, legislation championed by Cox resulted in the establishment of the Online Virginia Network (OVN). OVN is an online consortium that offers degrees in high demand fields from Virginia public universities. The program began with two universities participating—George Mason University and Old Dominion University—and has since expanded to include the Virginia Community College System.

On January 10, 2018, Cox was unanimously elected as Speaker of the House by the members of the House of Delegates. Upon being sworn in, he became the first Speaker in state history from Colonial Heights, the first Speaker to represent a portion of Chesterfield County since the 1800s, and the first Speaker whose profession was that of a public school teacher.

On February 5, 2019, Cox helped the Virginia House of Delegates pass House Bill 2577 to lift the age cap for autism coverage. Upon passage of the bill, Cox said, "Many of these children are not diagnosed until they are already six or seven years of age and need access to important care for longer than just three or four years." WTKR reported that "no other prevalent health condition—including asthma, diabetes and cancer—has coverage limits that are imposed based on the patient's age. Coverage for all other health conditions is based on medical necessity."

In June 2019, judges declared the House of Delegates' district map illegal due to racial gerrymandering, and imposed a new map. Republican members of the House of Delegates drew the old map in 2011. Cox has opposed the court's ruling, conceding that the map had been drawn to gain political advantage, but not to suppress voters based on race. District 66, represented by Cox, is among the districts that underwent substantial redistricting. The district—as currently drawn—voted for Barack Obama in 2012, Hillary Clinton in 2016, and Joe Biden in 2020; Cox was reelected in 2019.

In July 2019, Cox formally closed a special session on gun control after 1 hour and 30 minutes of deliberation between fellow delegates. Governor Ralph Northam called for the session after the shooting at Virginia Beach, and Cox adjourned the session with no actions taken.

In the 2019 election, Cox was re-elected to a 16th term, but the Republicans lost their majority, making it the first time since 1997 Democrats won the House of Delegates. He relinquished the role of Speaker to Democrat Eileen Filler-Corn on January 8, 2020.

On November 17, 2020, Cox announced his campaign for Governor of Virginia in 2021. Since announcing his run for governor, Cox has not held back from publicly criticizing Governor Ralph Northam on countless topics, the biggest being Northam's handling of the coronavirus pandemic and sending kids back to school. While Cox has accepted the validity of President Joe Biden's victory in the 2020 presidential election, he has shown sympathy for former president Donald Trump's false claim that the election was stolen.

On May 8, 2021, Cox was defeated in the Republican convention, coming in fourth place in a seven-candidate field; he was eliminated in the fourth round of ranked-choice voting, with 14% of the vote.

== Personal life ==
Cox and his wife Julie reside in Colonial Heights, Virginia. They have four sons: Lane, Carter, Blake, and Cameron. Cox taught government at Manchester High School in Chesterfield County until his retirement in 2012.

== Electoral history ==
Date	Election	Candidate	Party	Votes	%
Virginia House of Delegates, 66th district
November 7, 1989	General	M. Kirkland Cox	Republican	10,460	52.47
November 7, 1989	General	John G. Dicks, III	Democratic	9,468	47.49
November 7, 1989	General	Write Ins		8	0.04
November 7, 1989	General	Incumbent lost; seat switched from Democratic to Republican			
November 5, 1991	General	M. Kirkland Cox	Republican	10,273	67.58
November 5, 1991	General	Jay T. Leverett	Democratic	4,919	32.36
November 5, 1991	General	Write Ins		9	0.06
November 2, 1993	General	M. Kirkland Cox	Republican	19,876	99.73
November 2, 1993	General	Write Ins		53	0.27
November 7, 1995	General	M. Kirkland Cox	Republican	11,771	82.12
November 7, 1995	General	Gregory R. Rasnake	Democratic	2,554	17.82
November 7, 1995	General	Write Ins		9	0.06
November 4, 1997	General	M. Kirkland Cox	Republican	20,827	98.74
November 4, 1997	General	Write Ins		265	1.26
November 2, 1999	General	M. Kirkland Cox	Republican	11,260	98.69
November 2, 1999	General	Write Ins		150	1.31
November 6, 2001	General	M. Kirkland Cox	Republican	19,077	98.29
November 6, 2001	General	Write Ins		331	1.71
November 4, 2003	General	M. Kirkland Cox	Republican	10,896	97.76
November 4, 2003	General	Write Ins		250	2.24
November 8, 2005	General	M. Kirkland Cox	Republican	21,205	96.87
November 8, 2005	General	Write Ins		685	3.13
November 6, 2007	General	M. Kirkland Cox	Republican	11,049	97.51
November 6, 2007	General	Write Ins		281	2.48
November 3, 2009	General	M. Kirkland Cox	Republican	21,428	97.02
November 3, 2009	General	Write Ins		657	2.97
November 8, 2011	General	M. Kirkland Cox	Republican	10,681	96.32
November 8, 2011	General	Write Ins		407	3.67
November 5, 2013	General	M. Kirkland Cox	Republican	20,224	94.69
November 5, 2013	General	Write Ins		1,135	5.31
November 3, 2015	General	M. Kirkland Cox	Republican	12,683	96.43
November 3, 2015	General	Write Ins		469	3.57
November 7, 2017	General	M. Kirkland Cox	Republican	18,572	63.45
November 7, 2017	General	Katie A. Sponsler	Democratic	10,656	36.41
November 7, 2017	General	Write Ins		40	0.14
November 5, 2019	General	M. Kirkland Cox	Republican	14,443	51.71
November 5, 2019	General	Sheila C. Bynum-Coleman	Democratic	13,140	47.05
November 5, 2019	General	L. K. Harris, Sr.	Independent	342	1.22
November 5, 2019	General	Write Ins		4	0.01

Virginia House of Delegates
Preceded by Chip Dicks	Member of the Virginia House of Delegates from the 66th district 1990–2022	Succeeded by Mike Cherry
Preceded by Morgan Griffith	Majority Leader of the Virginia House of Delegates; 2010–2018	Succeeded by Todd Gilbert
Political offices
Preceded by Bill Howell	Speaker of the Virginia House of Delegates; 2018–2020	Succeeded by Eileen Filler-Corn
