= 2011 Henrico County Commonwealth's Attorney election =

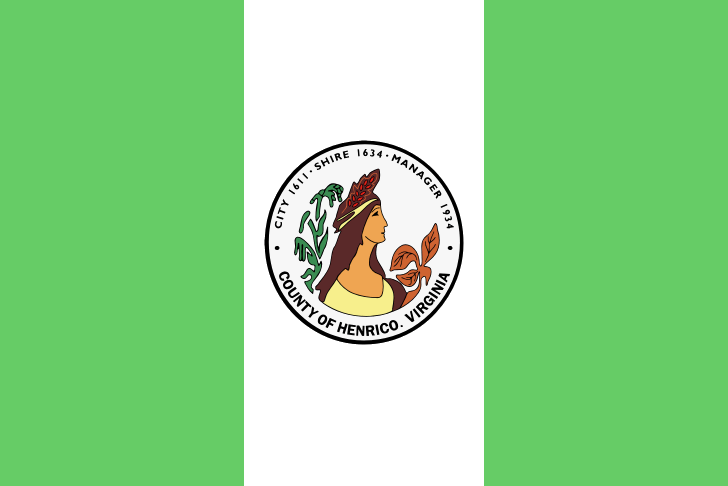
- November 8, 2011

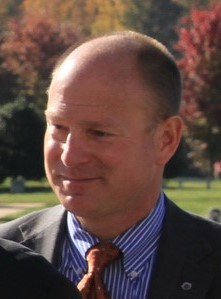

Candidate	Shannon Taylor	Bill Janis (Note: Janis is a Republican who ran as an Independent politician against Geary.)	Matthew Geary
Party	Democratic	Independent	Republican
Popular vote	25,975	21,540	9,045
Percentage	45.85%	38.02%	15.97%
- Precinct results Taylor: 40–50% 50–60% 60–70% 70–80% 80–90% Janis: 30–40% 40–50% 50–60% 60–70%
Previous Attorney
Wade A. Kizer
Republican
Attorney
Shannon Taylor
Democratic

The 2011 Henrico County Commonwealth's Attorney election was held on November 8, 2011, to elect the Commonwealth's Attorney of Henrico County, Virginia, concurrently with elections to the Senate of Virginia and Virginia House of Delegates. Incumbent Republican Commonwealth's Attorney Wade A. Kizer announced that he would be retiring from the position, making it an open contest. Republicans Matthew Geary and Bill Janis and Democrat Shannon Taylor all ran for Attorney, with Taylor beating both in the general election.

== Background ==
Republican attorney Wade A. Kizer, who had been in office since 2000, announced his candidacy for the next term in 2009, while attorney Matthew Geary went against him for the Republican primary. Geary won against Kizer in the Republican primary, with many Republicans against the endorsement. In 2010, Kizer announced that he would not be running for another term and that he would retire from the office. On August 11, 2011, the same day as the 5.8 earthquake in Virginia, attorney Shannon Taylor announced her candidacy for the Commonwealth's Attorney. Days later, Republican Bill Janis entered the race as an Independent politician, dropping his bid for another term for the Virginia House of Delegates.

The Republican Party of Virginia started questioning Geary's leadership after he admitted to an extramarital affair. The Republican Party of Virginia withdrew their endorsement of Geary and endorsed Janis instead. The Henrico County Executive Committee called Geary "an angry and volatile candidate”, and one of his consultants, Amanda Chase, left the campaign.

== Republican primary ==
=== Declared ===
- Matthew Geary, prosecutor and former Chief Deputy Commonwealth’s Attorney for Richmond (2006–2009)

=== Withdrew ===
- Wade A. Kizer, incumbent Commonwealth's Attorney

=== Endorsements ===
Matthew Geary
- ~~Eric Cantor, House Majority Leader (2011–2014)~~ (withdrew support)
- ~~Republican Party of Virginia~~ (withdrew support)

== Democratic primary ==
- Shannon Taylor, attorney

=== Endorsements ===
List of political endorsements
- Joe Morrissey, member of the Virginia House of Delegates (2007–2014)

== Other parties ==
- Bill Janis, member of the Virginia House of Delegates (2002–2012)

=== Endorsements ===
List of political endorsements
- Eric Cantor, House Majority Leader (2011–2014)
- Ken Cuccinelli, Attorney General of Virginia (2010–2014)
- Bill Bolling, Lieutenant Governor of Virginia (2006–2014)
- Republican Party of Virginia

== Results ==
Taylor won the election with 45.85% of the total vote, with Janis coming second with 38.02% and Geary at last with 15.97%. Her win made her the first woman to become the Commonwealth's Attorney, with it also being the first time a Democrat had been in power since 1987. Some attributed her win as a result of Geary and Janis splitting the Republican vote.

In 2012, Janis was offered a job by governor Bob McDonnell in the Department of Veterans Services after weeks of speculation after his loss.

2011 Henrico County Commonwealth's Attorney Election
Party	Candidate	Votes	%
Democratic	Shannon Taylor	25,975	45.85%
Independent	Bill Janis	21,540	38.02%
Republican	Matthew Geary	9,045	15.97%
