= Virginia's 65th House of Delegates district =

Virginia legislative district

District map from the 2023 election

Virginia's 65th House of Delegates district elects one of 100 seats in the Virginia House of Delegates, the lower house of the state's bicameral legislature. Located in central Virginia, District 65 represents Powhatan County as well as parts of Chesterfield County, Fluvanna County, and Goochland County. The seat has been held by Republican R. Lee Ware since 1998.

== Elections ==
=== 2017 ===
In the November 2017 election, Democrat Francis Stevens, a police officer at Virginia's state capitol, ran against Ware, a former teacher.

== List of delegates ==
Delegate	Party	Years	Electoral history
John Watkins	Republican	January 12, 1983 – January 13, 1998	Won election to Senate
Lee Ware	Republican	January 16, 1998 – present	First elected in 1998
