= Virginia's 66th House of Delegates district =

Virginia state legislative district

District map from the 2023 election

Virginia's 66th House of Delegates district elects one of 100 seats in the Virginia House of Delegates, the lower house of the state's bicameral legislature. District 66 represents the city of Colonial Heights as well as part of Chesterfield County. The seat has been held by Democrat Nicole Cole since 2026.

== Recent election results ==
=== 2000s ===
Virginia's 66th House of Delegates district, 2007
Party	Candidate	Votes	%
Republican	Kirk Cox (incumbent)	11,049	100.0
Total votes		11,049	100.0
Republican hold			

Virginia's 66th House of Delegates district, 2009
Party	Candidate	Votes	%
Republican	Kirk Cox (incumbent)	21,428	100.0
Total votes		21,428	100.0
Republican hold			

=== 2010s ===
Virginia's 66th House of Delegates district, 2011
Party	Candidate	Votes	%
Republican	Kirk Cox (incumbent)	10,681	100.0
Total votes		10,681	100.0
Republican hold			

Virginia's 66th House of Delegates district, 2013
Party	Candidate	Votes	%
Republican	Kirk Cox (incumbent)	20,224	100.0
Total votes		20,224	100.0
Republican hold			

Virginia's 66th House of Delegates district, 2015
Party	Candidate	Votes	%
Republican	Kirk Cox (incumbent)	12,683	100.0
Total votes		12,683	100.0
Republican hold			

Virginia's 66th House of Delegates district, 2017
Party	Candidate	Votes	%
Republican	Kirk Cox (incumbent)	18,572	63.54
Democratic	Katie Sponsler	10,656	36.46
Total votes		29,228	100.0
Republican hold			

Virginia's 66th House of Delegates district, 2019
Party	Candidate	Votes	%
Republican	Kirk Cox (incumbent)	14,443	51.7
Democratic	Sheila Bynum-Coleman	13,147	47.0
Independent	Linnard Harris, Sr.	343	1.2
Write-in		19	0.1
Total votes		27,952	100.0
Republican hold			

== List of delegates ==
Delegate	Party	Years	Electoral history
Chip Dicks	Democratic	January 12, 1983 – January 10, 1990	Lost reelection
Kirk Cox	Republican	January 10, 1990 – January 12, 2022	Retired to run for Governor
Mike Cherry	Republican	January 12, 2022 - January 14, 2026	First elected in 2021
Nicole Cole	Democratic	January 14, 2026 - Present	First elected in 2025
