= Frederick T. Gray =

American politician (1918–1992)

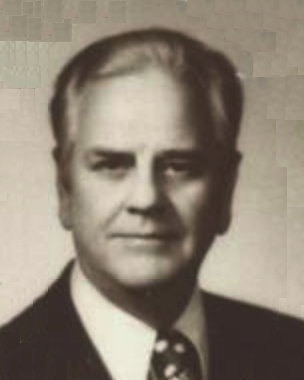

Member of the Virginia Senate from the 11th district
- In office January 12, 1972 – January 11, 1984
- Preceded by: Lloyd C. Bird
- Succeeded by: Robert E. Russell

Member of the Virginia House of Delegates for Chesterfield and Colonial Heights City
- In office January 12, 1966 – January 12, 1972
- Preceded by: Edward M. Hudgins
- Succeeded by: Alex McMurtrie Jr.

29th Attorney General of Virginia
- In office April 30, 1961 – January 13, 1962
- Appointed by: J. Lindsay Almond
- Preceded by: Albertis Harrison
- Succeeded by: Robert Young Button

Personal details
- Born: Frederick Thomas Gray; October 10, 1918 Petersburg, Virginia, U.S.
- Died: May 14, 1992 (aged 73) Chester, Virginia, U.S.
- Spouse: Eva Helms Johnson
- Children: 2, including Frederick Jr.
- Education: University of Richmond (LLB)

Military service
- Branch/service: United States Army; Army Air Forces
- Battles/wars: World War II

Frederick Thomas Gray (October 10, 1918 – May 14, 1992) was a Virginia attorney and Democratic Party politician. Governor J. Lindsay Almond appointed Gray to serve as Attorney General of Virginia after the resignation of Attorney General Albertis Harrison (a member of the Democratic political organization led by Senator Harry F. Byrd) to run for Governor of Virginia during the Massive Resistance crisis in Virginia. Gray returned to private practice at Williams Mullen after Robert Young Button (elected Attorney General during the same 1961 election in which Harrison became Governor) took office. Gray later served in the Virginia House of Delegates and the Virginia Senate (both part-time positions) as he continued his law practice.

== Early and family life ==
Frederick Gray was born in Petersburg, Virginia to Franklin Pierce and the former Mary Gervase (Pouder).

The day Gray was commissioned as a first lieutenant and navigator in the Army Air Corps, October 16, 1943, he married Evelyn Helms Johnson of Chesterfield County, Virginia who had traveled cross-country to the wedding in Sacramento, California. After decades living at her family's ancestral home at Bermuda Hundred, Virginia, she survived him, as would a son (with his father's name but nickname "Rick") and daughter.

After World War II ended, Gray attended the University of Richmond Law School and was admitted to the Virginia Bar.

== Career ==
Gray served as an Assistant attorney general for the Commonwealth of Virginia from 1949–1957 and briefly as attorney general (1961–1962). Between those public service stints, he was a partner at various law firms, including Williams Mullen (1957–1961, 62–83), and later at Gray, Sinnott, Tucker & Duke in Chesterfield, Virginia (1983–1985). In 1965, Gray's testimony that Virginia did not discriminate against black voters was subject to cross-examination by U.S. Senator Edward Kennedy, which civil rights attorney and later fellow Virginia State Senator Henry L. Marsh believes led to the passage of the Voting Rights Act of 1965. In 1967 Gray argued and lost Green v. County School Board of New Kent County before the U.S.Supreme Court; the court striking down the nominal school choice plans based on their actual performance.

Gray served in the Virginia House of Delegates from 1966 until 1972, when he began service in the Virginia Senate. In the redistricting after Davis v. Mann for the 1965 election the district consisting of Chesterfield County and the City of Colonial Heights, previously represented by Edward M. Hudgins, received an additional delegate slot. Gray and John S. Hansen won election to represent that district District 23. Gray was re-elected in 1967 and 1969, but Hansen resigned between those elections, and was replaced by Republican George Wilson Jones. Also, in the 1969 election, Jones polled more votes than Gray in the 2-member district, which was split and after the 1970 census such that Jones won re-election to the 36th district in subsequent years. Alexander B. McMurtrie Jr. succeeded Gray, who ran for the state Senate in 1971.

Gray represented Chesterfield County with various adjacent areas in the 11th Senatorial District (1972–1984). He first won election to the newly configured 11th district in 1971. Lloyd C. Bird had previously represented Chesterfield County, along with Amelia, Charles City and New Kent Counties and the city of Colonial Heights as District 29 in the 1967 election and with James City County and the City of Williamsburg rather than Amelia County in the 1963 election as District 32, and before that with Charles City, Chesterfield and Henrico Counties and the city of Colonial Heights as District 33. Before the 1971 election, District 11 encompassed various counties south and west of Chesterfield County, not even adjacent to Chesterfield County. In any event, the district configuration changed after the election, so that in 1974 and 1975 Senator Gray represented Chesterfield and Henrico counties, with another part of Chesterfield county agglomerated with Amelia, Brunswick, Cumberland, Lunenburg, Mecklenburg, Nottoway and Powhatan Counties in District 17, represented by James T. Edmunds. Neither Gray nor Edmunds was opposed. Gray also won re-election unopposed in 1975 and 1979. Republican Robert E. Russell Sr. ran unopposed in that district in 1983.

A past president of the Chesterfield Bar Association, Gray also served on the board of directors of Pioneer Savings & Loan and Jefferson National Bank (eastern region).

== Death and legacy ==
A bridge on Route 295 over the Appomattox River was named in his honor in 1998. His children also established a charitable trust in honor of their parents.

Legal offices
Preceded by Albertis S. Harrison	Attorney General of Virginia; 1961–1962	Succeeded by Robert Y. Button
