= Ghazala Hashmi =

American politician (born 1964)

- Hashmi in 2026

43rd Lieutenant Governor of Virginia
- Incumbent
- Assumed office January 17, 2026
- Governor: Abigail Spanberger
- Preceded by: Winsome Earle-Sears

Member of the Virginia Senate
- In office January 8, 2020 – January 17, 2026
- Preceded by: Glen Sturtevant
- Succeeded by: Michael Jones
- Constituency: 10th district (2020–2024); 15th district (2024–2026)

Personal details
- Born: Ghazala Firdous Hashmi; July 5, 1964 (age 62) Hyderabad, Andhra Pradesh, India (now Telangana, India)
- Party: Democratic
- Spouse: Azhar Rafiq
- Children: 2
- Education: Georgia Southern University (BA); Emory University (MA, PhD)
- Website: Official website Campaign website

Ghazala Firdous Hashmi (/ɡəˈzɑːlə ˈhɑːʃmi/ gə-ZAHL-ə HASH-mee; born July 5, 1964) is an American politician serving as the 43rd lieutenant governor of Virginia since 2026. A member of the Democratic Party, she previously served as a Virginia state senator for the 15th district from 2020 to 2026. She is the first Asian-American (Indian-American) and Muslim elected to statewide office in Virginia, along with being the first Muslim woman to win statewide office anywhere in the United States.

Born in Hyderabad, India and raised in the state of Georgia, Hashmi earned a PhD in English from Emory University. In 2019, she was elected to the Virginia General Assembly and re-elected in 2023. As the Democratic nominee in the 2025 Virginia lieutenant gubernatorial election, Hashmi defeated Republican John Reid in the general election.

== Early life and career ==
Ghazala Hashmi was born on July 5, 1964, in Hyderabad, India, to Hyderabadi Muslim parents Tanveer and Zia Hashmi. Her mother, Tanveer Hashmi, is a double graduate with a Bachelor of Arts and Bachelor of Education from Osmania University College for Women. Her father, Professor Zia Hashmi, was an alumnus of Aligarh Muslim University, where he completed his undergraduate and master's degrees. He completed his PhD in International Relations from the University of South Carolina and soon after began his university teaching career. Hashmi's maternal grandfather served in the finance department of the Government of Andhra Pradesh.

Hashmi spent her early years at her maternal grandparents' home in Malakpet until the age of four, when she moved with her mother and older brother to join her father in Georgia.

In 1969, when she was four years old, Hashmi's family moved to the United States, settling in Statesboro, Georgia. Her father taught in Georgia Southern University's political science department for 32 years, and served as the founding director of the Center for International Studies. Hashmi attended the Marvin Pittman Laboratory School at the university, and she graduated valedictorian of her class at Statesboro High School.

Hashmi earned a Bachelor of Arts in English at Georgia Southern University and a PhD in English from Emory University. Her 1992 dissertation was titled, "William Carlos Williams and the American Ground of 'In the American Grain' and 'Paterson'". Peter Dowell was her doctoral advisor.

Hashmi was an educator and academic administrator for 25 years. She was a visiting assistant professor of English at the University of Richmond and a professor at J. Sargeant Reynolds Community College, where she served as the founding director of the Center for Excellence in Teaching and Learning.

== Political career ==
=== Virginia State Senate ===
Hashmi decided to run for office in Donald Trump's first term in office, largely sparked by the anger she felt over the Muslim travel ban. In the 2019 Virginia Senate election, Hashmi defeated incumbent Republican Glen Sturtevant in the 10th district, flipping the chamber to Democratic control. She is the first woman to represent the district and the first Muslim elected to the Senate of Virginia. She was officially sworn into office on January 8, 2020.

In 2023, Hashmi was re-elected with over 60% of the vote against Republican candidate Hayden Fisher in the redistricted 15th district. A legal challenge was filed shortly after claiming Hashmi did not meet the residency requirements to hold office, having established her residency at a rental apartment within the 15th district while her family home nearby was in a neighboring district. A judge dismissed the lawsuit fully in early December as having no legal merit.

=== Lieutenant governor of Virginia (2026–present) ===
==== 2025 election ====
In May 2024, Hashmi announced her campaign for lieutenant governor. She narrowly advanced from the Democratic primary in June 2025, ahead of former Richmond mayor Levar Stoney and fellow state senator Aaron Rouse respectively. With this nomination, Hashmi became both the first Muslim and the first Indian-American to be nominated for a statewide office in Virginia.

In the general election, Hashmi faced the Republican nominee, former radio host John Reid, who was the first openly gay person to be nominated by a major party for a statewide office in Virginia. She regularly quoted Abraham Lincoln while on the campaign trail, particularity including his 1862 State of the Union address. Hashmi would defeat Reid by 11 points. Hashmi became the first Muslim woman elected to a statewide office in American history.

==== Tenure ====
She was sworn into office on January 17, 2026, being sworn in by Virginia Supreme Court Chief Justice Cleo Powell and using her family's Quran and an original version of the United States Constitution printed in 1799 on loan from the Virginia Museum of History and Culture located in Richmond. Her office says, "these cultural and historic artifacts reflect the nation’s founding legal structures, our commitment to religious plurality and freedoms, and the richness of the Commonwealth's diversity." On April 7, 2026, while casting an early vote, Hashmi voted in favor of a proposed state amendment calling for U.S. House redistricting in Virginia.

== Policy positions ==
=== Healthcare ===
In February 2024, following the overturning of Roe v. Wade, Hashmi and delegate Marcia Price introduced the Right to Contraception Act, which would establish a legal right to access and use contraception in Virginia including oral contraceptive pills, intrauterine devices, and condoms. It would also protect medical providers and pharmacists from legal action for providing contraception to patients. The bill passed the Virginia General Assembly but was vetoed by governor Glenn Youngkin in May. The bill was reintroduced in 2025 but was vetoed by Youngkin again.

In February 2025, the Senate passed Hashmi's bill which would block the extradition of health care providers who faced criminal charges in other states for performing medical services that are legal in Virginia such as abortion and gender-affirming care.

Also in February 2025, Hashmi introduced a budget amendment alongside Creigh Deeds that would have set out a plan to find alternative funding if Virginia's federal Medicaid funding was cut. As chair of the Senate's Education and Health Committee, she supported Virginia's health insurance marketplace and federal premium tax credits.

=== Education ===
In January 2025, Hashmi sponsored a bill to end a cap on state-funding for support positions in public schools which would cost $1.1 billion.

=== Economy ===
In April 2025, Hashmi stated her support for repealing Virginia's right-to-work laws. In a July opinion piece for the Richmond Times-Dispatch, she criticized Donald Trump's federal worker layoffs as the primary reason for Virginia's drop from first to fourth place in CNBC’s 2025 "America's Top States For Business" ranking.

== Personal life ==
In 1991, Ghazala Hashmi married Azhar Rafiq. The couple has two adult daughters. They live in the Richmond area.

== Electoral history ==
=== 2019 election ===
Virginia's 10th Senate District, 2019 primary election
Party	Candidate	Votes	%
Democratic	Ghazala Hashmi	5,246	49.4%
Democratic	Eileen Bedell	4,347	40.9%
Democratic	Zachary Parks Brown	1,032	9.7%
Democratic	Write-ins	2	0.0%
Total votes		10,627	100%

Virginia's 10th Senate District, 2019 general election
Party	Candidate	Votes	%
Democratic	Ghazala Hashmi	44,548	54.10%
Republican	Glen Sturtevant (incumbent)	37,737	45.80%
Write-in		92	0.01%
Total votes		82,377	100.00%
Democratic gain from Republican			

=== 2023 election ===
Virginia's 15th Senate District, 2023 general election
Party	Candidate	Votes	%
Democratic	Ghazala Hashmi (incumbent)	33,253	62.16%
Republican	Hayden Fisher	20,042	37.46%
Write-in		202	0.38%
Total votes		53,494	100.00%
Democratic hold			

=== 2025 election ===
2025 Democratic lieutenant gubernatorial primary

Results by county and independent city: Hashmi: 20–30%; 30–40%; 40–50%; 50–60%; Stoney: 20–30%; 30–40%; 40–50%; 50–60%; 60–70%; 70–80%; Rouse: 20–30%; 30–40%; 40–50%; 50–60%; 60–70%; Lateef: 30–40%; Bastani: 30–40%; Tie: 20–30%

2025 Virginia Lt. Governor Democratic primary
Party	Candidate	Votes	%
Democratic	Ghazala Hashmi	131,865	27.39%
Democratic	Levar Stoney	128,262	26.64%
Democratic	Aaron Rouse	126,802	26.34%
Democratic	Babur Lateef	40,447	8.40%
Democratic	Alex Bastani	27,386	5.69%
Democratic	Victor Salgado	26,682	5.54%
Total votes		481,444	100.00%

2025 lieutenant gubernatorial election

2025 Virginia lieutenant gubernatorial election
Party	Candidate	Votes	%	±%
Democratic	Ghazala Hashmi	1,900,104	55.65%	+6.48%
Republican	John Reid	1,505,395	44.09%	−6.62%
Write-in		8,678	0.25%	+0.13%
Total votes		3,414,177	100.00	
Turnout				
Registered electors				
Democratic gain from Republican				

== Selected works ==
=== Books ===
- Bensen, Beth; Woetzel, Denise; Wu, Hong; Hashmi, Ghazala (September 29, 2016). "Chapter 19. Impacting Information Literacy through Alignment, Resources, and Assessment". In D'Angelo, Barbara J; Jamieson, Sandra; Maid, Barry; Walker, Janet R. (eds.). Information Literacy: Research and Collaboration across Disciplines (PDF). University Press of Colorado. pp. 397–410. doi:10.37514/PER-B.2016.0834. ISBN 978-1-64215-083-4.
- Hashmi, Ghazala (March 4, 2016). "Chapter 10. Shifting the City's Center within Katherine Boo's Behind the Beautiful Forevers". In Wilhite, Keith (ed.). The City Since 9/11: Literature, Film, Television. Bloomsbury Publishing. pp. 177–192. ISBN 1611477190.

=== Articles ===
- Hashmi, Ghazala (2022). "Safe at Home: Addressing Virginia's Housing Policy Concerns in a Pandemic". Richmond Public Interest Law Review. 25 (1): 25–46.
- Hashmi, Ghazala Firdous (1991). William Carlos Williams and the American ground of "In the American Grain" and "Paterson" (PhD thesis). Emory University.

Party political offices
Preceded by Hala Ayala	Democratic nominee for Lieutenant Governor of Virginia; 2025	Most recent
Political offices
Preceded by Winsome Earle-Sears	Lieutenant Governor of Virginia; 2026–present	Incumbent
