= Peter Farrell (politician) =

American politician (born 1983)

Member of the Virginia House of Delegates from the 56th district
- In office January 11, 2012 – January 10, 2018
- Preceded by: Bill Janis
- Succeeded by: John McGuire

Personal details
- Born: Peter Francis Farrell; June 12, 1983 (age 43) Alexandria, Virginia, U.S.
- Party: Republican
- Education: University of Virginia
- Occupation: Business development
- Website: delegatefarrell.com

Peter Francis Farrell (born June 12, 1983) is an American politician. From 2012 to 2018 he served in the Virginia House of Delegates, representing the 56th district, made up of Louisa County and parts of Goochland, Henrico, and Spotsylvania Counties, to the north and west of Richmond.

Farrell served on the House committees on Education, Finance and Commerce and Labor.

== Early life, education, business career ==
Farrell is a great-grandson of Thomas Farrell of the Manhattan Project, and a son of Thomas Farrell, CEO of Dominion Resources, a board member for Altria, and co-producer and co-writer of Field of Lost Shoes. He attended the Collegiate School and received a B.A. degree in government from the University of Virginia in 2006. He worked as a legislative assistant for Virginia Beach-based state Senator Ken Stolle.

Farrell later joined Recast Energy, a Richmond-based company, founded in October 2010, that converts biomass to steam for industrial use. Farrell works in business development.

== Political career ==
On August 12, 2011, the 56th district incumbent, Republican Bill Janis, announced that he was running as an independent candidate for Henrico County Commonwealth's Attorney, challenging the Republican nominee, Matthew Geary. Farrell became the Republican nominee in the 56th, succeeding Janis. He was unopposed in the general election. On November 22, 2019, he was appointed to the Virginia Commonwealth University Board of Visitors by Ralph Northam

== See also ==
- Catherine Bertini (cousin)
- Patricia Dillon Cafferata (cousin)
- Europa (AK-81) (ship named for granduncle)
