= Mike Cherry (Virginia politician) =

American politician from Virginia

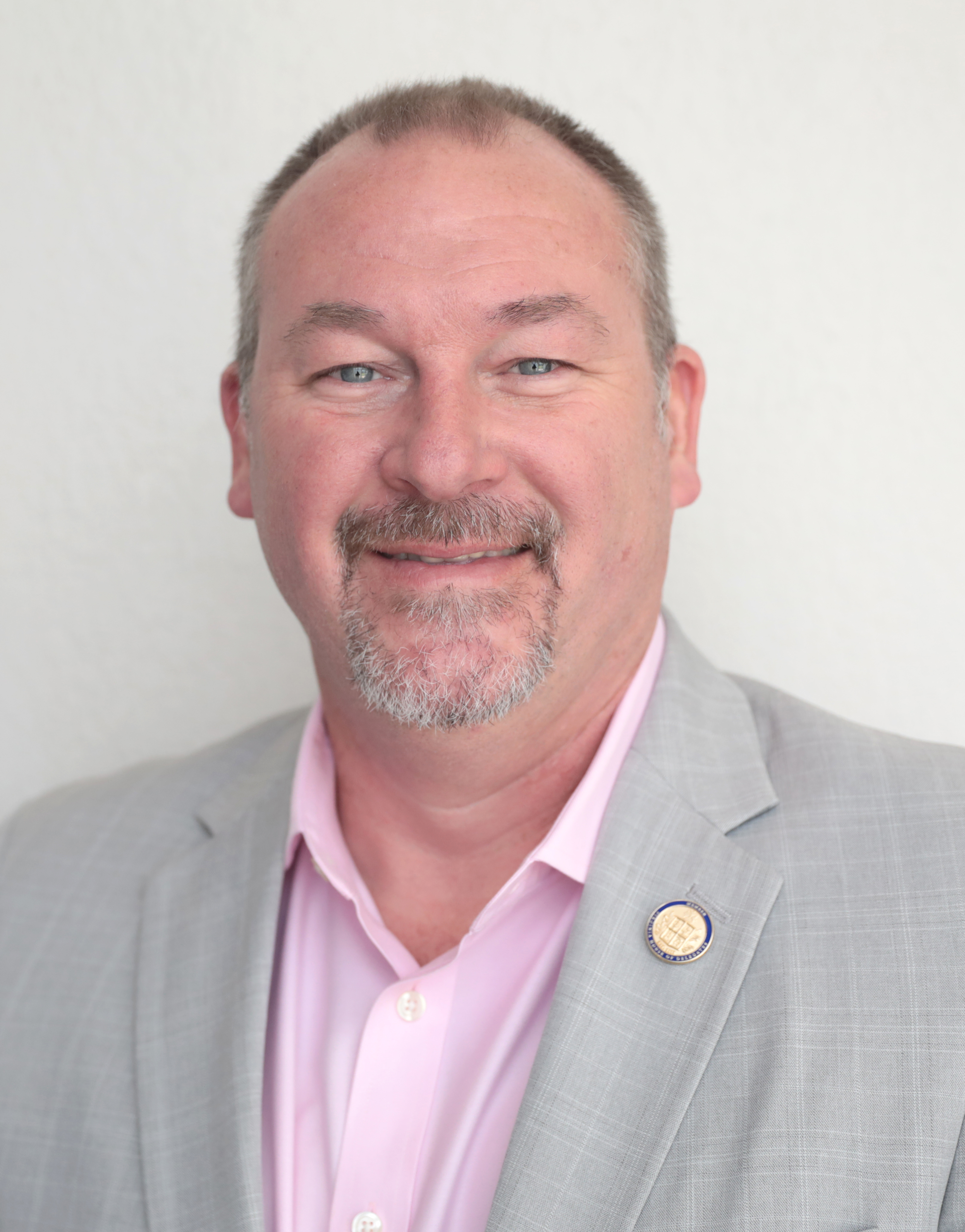
- Cherry at the Young Americans for Liberty's Hazlitt Summit, 2022

Member of the Virginia House of Delegates
- Incumbent
- Assumed office January 12, 2022
- Preceded by: Kirk Cox
- Constituency: 66th district (2022–2024); 74th district (2024–present)

Personal details
- Born: Michael Allen Cherry; 1972 (age 53–54) Rocky Mount, North Carolina, U.S.
- Party: Republican
- Spouse: Teresa Hudson
- Children: 2
- Education: Air University (AS); Liberty University (BS); Regent University (MEd, EdS)
- Website: Campaign website

Military service
- Branch/service: United States Air Force
- Years of service: 1991–2011
- Rank: Master Sergeant

Michael Allen Cherry (born 1972) is an American politician. A Republican, he is a member of the Virginia House of Delegates, representing the 74th district since January 2022.

== Early life and career ==
Cherry was born in Rocky Mount, North Carolina, in 1972. He served in the United States Air Force from 1991 to 2011, while receiving a Bachelor of Science in Religion at Liberty University in 2010. After retiring from the Air Force, Cherry attended Regent University to pursue his Master of Education for the Education and Educational Specialist field.

Cherry now also serves as an administrator at Life Church in Chester.

== Political career ==
Cherry had been a member of the Colonial Heights city council between 2017 and 2021.

Cherry announced running for delegate of the 66th district in 2020, following his re-election to the Colonial Heights city council. Cherry ran for the 66th district against Katie Sponsler, and defeated her by a margin of 4.9 points.

Following the 2023 redistricting, Cherry ran for the newly redrawn 74th district with no democratic candidate, and ultimately won 87% of the votes.
