= 2015 Henrico County Commonwealth's Attorney election =

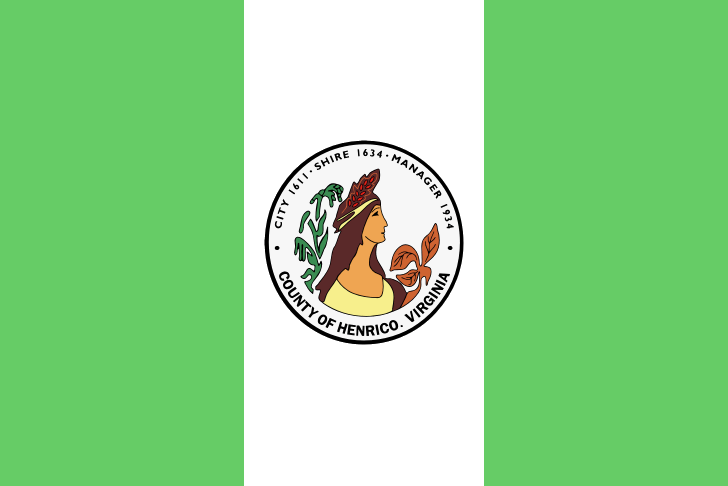
- November 3, 2015

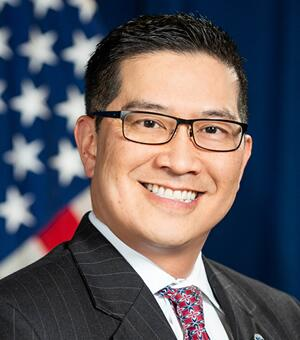
| Candidate | Shannon Taylor | Tony Pham |
| Party | Democratic | Republican |
| Popular vote | 35,020 | 27,272 |
| Percentage | 56.10% | 43.69% |
- Precinct results Taylor: 50–60% 60–70% 70–80% 80–90% Pham: 50–60% 60–70%
Previous Attorney
Shannon Taylor
Democratic
Attorney
Shannon Taylor
Democratic

The 2015 Henrico County Commonwealth's Attorney election was held on November 3, 2015, to elect the Commonwealth's Attorney of Henrico County, Virginia, concurrently with elections to the Senate of Virginia and Virginia House of Delegates. Incumbent Democratic Commonwealth's Attorney Shannon Taylor won reelection to a second term against Republican nominee Tony Pham by a wide margin.

== Background ==
Attorney Shannon Taylor, who had been serving as the incumbent Commonwealth's Attorney having won the previous election against Matthew Geary and Bill Janis, announced her campaign for reelection. On February 23, 2015, Pham announced his candidacy for the Henrico County Commonwealth's Attorney, being the fourth and last Republican to do so.

== Republican primary ==
The Republican primary took place in June 2015 with three candidates, as Tom Shaia had withdrawn from the race. Jeffrey Lee Everhart was predicted to win the primary, leading the primary by a small margin between him and Pham, but after a faulty report from the Pinchbeck Precinct was fixed, Pham lead the primary by 67 points. Pham was later declared the Republican nominee.

=== Candidates ===
- Jeffrey Lee Everhart, lawyer
- Shannon Dillon, attorney
- Tony Pham, prosecutor (2000–2008)

=== Withdrew ===
- Tom Shaia, lawyer

=== Endorsements ===
Jeffrey Lee Everhart
- Jim Gilmore, 68th Governor of Virginia (1998–2002)
- Richard Cullen, former state Attorney General of Virginia (1997–1998)
- Mike Wade, Henrico Sheriff
- Henry W. Stanley Jr., former Henrico Police Chief
- Learned Barry, Richmond prosecutor
Tony Pham
- Henrico County School Board

=== Results ===
Results of the 2015 Republican County election in Henrico County. Pham: 30–40%; 40–50%; 50–60%; 60–70%; 70–80%; Everhart: 30–40%; 40–50%; 50–60%; 60–70%; Dillon: 30–40%; 40–50%; 50–60%; Everhart-Dillon tie: 30–40%; 40–50%; 50–60%; Pham-Dillon tie: 30–40%

2015 Henrico County Commonwealth's Attorney – Republican Primary
| Party | Candidate | Votes | % |
|---|---|---|---|
| Republican | Tony Pham | 7,381 | 40.83% |
| Republican | Jeffrey L. Everhart | 7,314 | 40.46% |
| Republican | Shannon Dillon | 3,382 | 18.71% |

== Democratic primary ==
- Shannon Taylor, incumbent Commonwealth's Attorney

== Results ==
2015 Henrico County Commonwealth's Attorney Election
| Party | Candidate | Votes | % |
|---|---|---|---|
| Democratic | Shannon Taylor | 35,020 | 56.10% |
| Republican | Tony Pham | 27,272 | 43.69% |
