= John Watkins (Virginia politician, born 1947) =

American politician

Member of the Virginia Senate from the 10th district
- In office January 16, 1998 – January 13, 2016
- Preceded by: Joseph B. Benedetti
- Succeeded by: Glen Sturtevant

Member of the Virginia House of Delegates
- In office January 13, 1982 – January 13, 1998 Serving with George W. Jones and Robert E. Russell until 1983
- Preceded by: Alex McMurtrie Jr.
- Succeeded by: Lee Ware
- Constituency: 34th district (1982–1983); 65th district (1983–1998)

Personal details
- Born: John Chewning Watkins; March 1, 1947 (age 79) Petersburg, Virginia, U.S.
- Party: Republican
- Spouse: Kathy
- Children: 3 sons
- Education: Virginia Tech (BS)
- Occupation: Nursery owner

Military service
- Branch/service: United States Army
- Years of service: 1970–1971

John Chewning Watkins (born March 1, 1947) is a Virginia businessman and politician, who served in the Virginia General Assembly for 34 years. A Republican, Watkins served in the Virginia House of Delegates from 1982 to 1998, when he was elected to the Senate of Virginia. He represented the 10th district, situated in part of the city of Richmond and its westerly suburbs, including all of Amelia and Powhatan counties and parts of four others.

== Early and family life ==
Born in Petersburg, Virginia, Watkins graduated from Virginia Tech with a degree in horticulture. He served in the U.S. Army 1970–71. He is President of Watkins Nurseries Inc.

== Political career ==
Watkins was elected to the Virginia House of Delegates in 1982 and re-elected twice. He was then elected to the Virginia Senate. He became known for supporting public transit and regional cooperation.

Although he faced no opponent in 2007, and easily defeated Democrat David Meade Bernard in 2011, in November 2014, Watkins announced that he would not run for re-election in 2016. He cited wanting to spend more time with his grandchildren as well as new ethics laws following the conviction of former Governor Bob McDonnell. As legislators work part-time, many have full-time jobs. Watkins owns a nursery, land along Virginia Route 288 coveted by developers (for a shopping mall, among other things) and is Chairman of the Board of Essex Bank. The Richmond Times-Dispatch noted that Watkins was also considered a maverick, more liberal than many in his party. In a hotly contested race to succeed him in the 10th District, Republican Glen Sturtevant defeated Democrat Daniel Gecker.
