= Frederick T. Gray Jr. =

American politician

Rick Gray

Secretary of the Commonwealth of Virginia
- In office July 1, 1978 – August 17, 1981
- Governor: John N. Dalton
- Preceded by: Stanford Parris
- Succeeded by: Laurie Naismith

Personal details
- Born: Frederick Thomas Gray Jr. March 22, 1951 Hopewell, Virginia, U.S.
- Parent: Frederick T. Gray (father)
- Education: University of Virginia (BA, MEd, JD)

Frederick Thomas "Rick" Gray Jr. (born March 22, 1951) is an American politician, writer, actor, and former attorney and educator. Appointed by Governor John N. Dalton as Secretary of the Commonwealth of Virginia in 1978, Gray resigned in 1981 in solidarity with jailed air traffic controllers that were on strike. Gray spent several decades in Virginia teaching, writing, and acting before moving to Cannon Beach, Oregon in 2018. In 2022, he ran for the Oregon House of Representatives in the 32nd district.

== Early life and education ==
Rick Gray was born in Hopewell, Virginia to Frederick T. Gray and Evelyn Helms Johnson Gray and grew up in the historic Bermuda Hundred community in Chesterfield County, Virginia. After graduating from the University of Virginia and the University of Virginia Law School, he practiced law at Williams, Mullen & Christian in Richmond, Virginia until his appointment as Secretary of the Commonwealth.

== Secretary of the Commonwealth ==
Gray reformed Virginia's lobbyist disclosure rules by requiring disclosure of any entertainment costing more than $100, or any gifts which cost more than $5, despite pressure from lobbyists who had donated to Dalton's campaign for governor. Once considered a rising star in the Virginia Republican Party, Gray opposed the nomination of Ronald Reagan as the GOP candidate for president in 1980 and left the Republican Party rather than support Reagan. During the Professional Air Traffic Controllers Organization strike in 1981, Gray declined to fly in solidarity with jailed air traffic controllers, and subsequently resigned as Secretary of the Commonwealth as a result of the backlash from Virginia Republicans.

== Teaching, acting, and writing career ==
Between 1982 and 2004 Gray taught history at Midlothian High School in Chesterfield County, William Monroe High School in Greene County, Virginia, and the Appomattox Regional Governor's School in Petersburg, Virginia. He also began drama acting, including a UVA Drama production of Much Ado About Nothing with students Tina Fey and Sean Patrick Thomas. Gray later performed with the Pennsylvania Shakespeare Festival, the Virginia Shakespeare Festival, and Richmond Shakespeare.

Gray also wrote columns for the Chester, Virginia Village News and the Style Weekly in Richmond. He continued to act and write after moving to Staunton, Virginia in 2012 and finally to Cannon Beach in 2018.

== Candidate for the Oregon House of Representatives ==
Gray ran as an independent in Oregon's 32nd House district in the November 2022 general election.
