= Three Chopt =

Neighborhood of Richmond, Virginia

Coordinates: 37°34′39″N 77°31′35″W

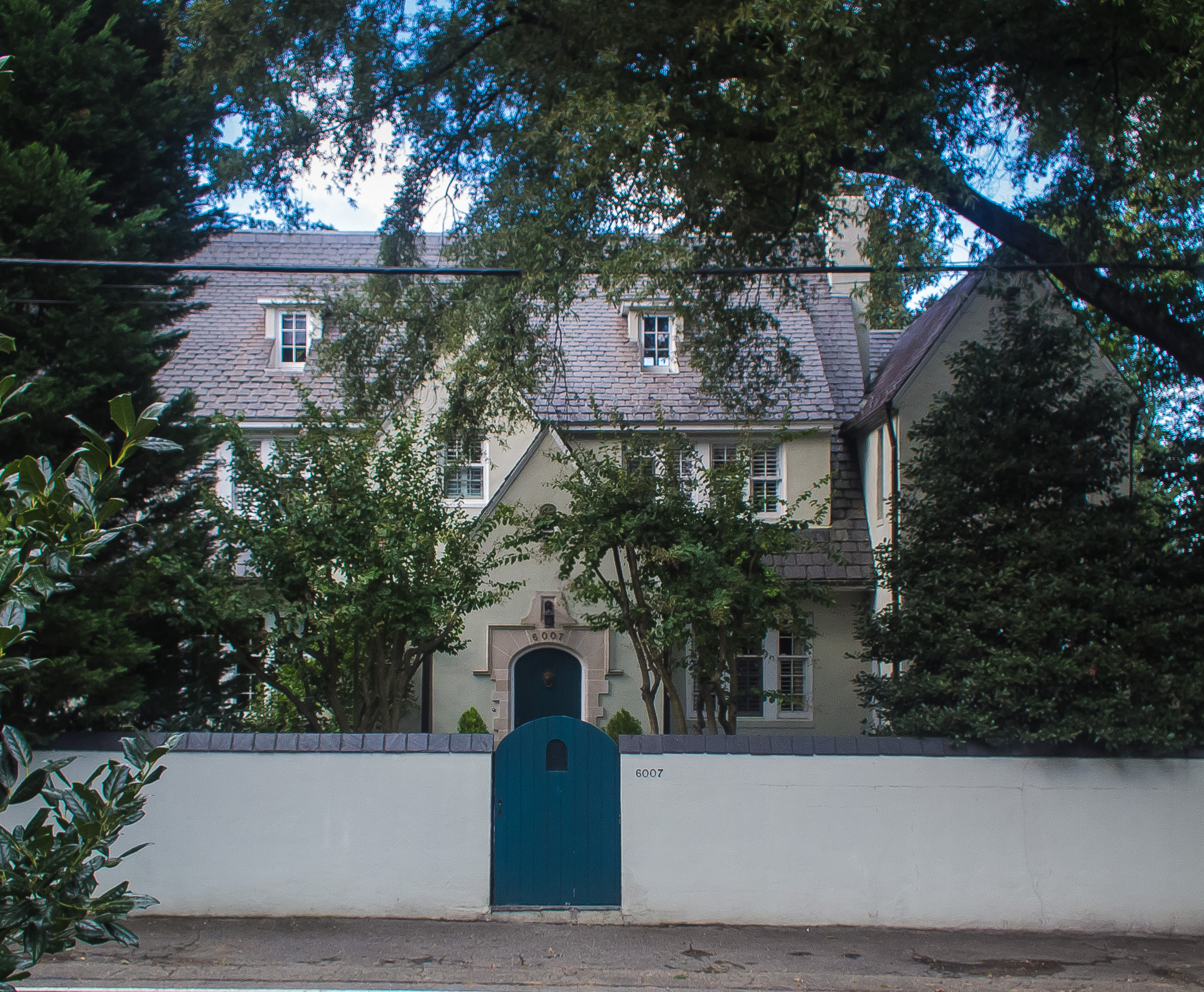
A house in Three Chopt's Historic District

Three Chopt is a neighborhood in western Richmond, Virginia that is located at the southern terminus of the famous Three Notch'd Road, which in itself serves as a main artery for the community. Located in the West End of the city, the neighborhood is directly to the east of the University of Richmond campus and the suburbs of Westham and Tuckahoe.

== See also ==
- Neighborhoods of Richmond, Virginia
- Three Notch'd Road
- West End (Richmond, Virginia)
