= America's Top States For Business =

America's Top States For Business CNBC, a division of NBC Universal, has been ranking state business climates annually since 2007. According to information compiled by CNBC, both from private industry sources, as well as State and Federal agencies, there have been increases and decreases in many U.S State's economies. Specifically, there have been sizable changes in state population, state GDP per capita, unemployment rates, foreclosure rates, budget gaps, and corporate tax rates. CNBC's state rankings are based on 10 categories: Cost of Doing Business, Workforce, Quality of Life, Infrastructure, Economy, Education, Technology & Innovation, Business, Friendliness, Access to Capital, and Cost of Living.

Virginia was ranked as No. 1 on CNBC's "America's Top States For Business 2011".

Category	Score	2011 Rank	2010 Rank
Cost of Doing Business	196	21	26
Workforce	227	12	9
Quality of Life	192	26	18
Infrastructure & Transportation	217	10	12
Economy	186	8	11
Education	177	6	13
Technology & Innovation	172	11	10
Business Friendliness	184	2	2
Access to Capital	82	10	9
Cost of Living	27	24	27
OVERALL	1660	1	2

CNBC: "America's Top States For Business 2011"

Previously in the 2010 report, Virginia was ranked as number 2 and in the 2009 report, Virginia was ranked as number 1. Virginia's current Governor is Bob McDonnell (R). The state's population is 8,001,024, with a GDP (2009 per capita) of $46,609. The unemployment rate as of May 2011 is 6.0 percent, the foreclosure rate as of May 2011 is one per 766 households, and the projected budget gap for 2012 is $2.0 billion. Also the corporate tax rate is 6.0 percent, and the largest employers are Northrop Grumman, Food Lion, and Booz Allen Hamilton.

Texas was ranked as No. 2 on CNBC's "America's Top States For Business 2011".

Category	Score	2011 Rank	2010 Rank
Cost of Doing Business	176	33	30
Workforce	203	14	16
Quality of Life	164	32	29
Infrastructure & Transportation	293	1	1
Economy	164	14	1
Education	113	27	30
Technology & Innovation	197	4	4
Business Friendliness	128	18	19
Access to Capital	94	4	7
Cost of Living	46	5	8
OVERALL	1578	2	1

CNBC: "America's Top States For Business 2011"

North Carolina was ranked as No. 3 on CNBC's "America's Top States For Business 2011".

Category	Score	2011 Rank	2010 Rank
Cost of Doing Business	238	8	15
Workforce	261	3	3
Quality of Life	163	33	32
Infrastructure & Transportation	234	3	10
Economy	84	41	37
Education	125	18	26
Technology & Innovation	171	12	11
Business Friendliness	154	12	13
Access to Capital	80	22	10
Cost of Living	29	22	23
OVERALL	1538	3	4

CNBC: "America's Top States For Business 2011"

Georgia was ranked as No. 4 on CNBC's "America's Top States For Business 2011".

Category	Score	2011 Rank	2010 Rank
Cost of Doing Business	208	18	20
Workforce	259	4	2
Quality of Life	140	38	35
Infrastructure & Transportation	273	2	2
Economy	107	35	37
Education	118	22	28
Technology & Innovation	156	17	17
Business Friendliness	134	16	17
Access to Capital	76	13	13
Cost of Living	42	9	9
OVERALL	1513	4	10

CNBC: "America's Top States For Business 2011"

Colorado was ranked as No. 5 on CNBC's "America's Top States For Business 2011".

Category	Score	2011 Rank	2010 Rank
Cost of Doing Business	179	30	25
Workforce	243	7	10
Quality of Life	257	7	2
Infrastructure & Transportation	176	26	36
Economy	128	26	8
Education	106	30	29
Technology & Innovation	169	14	12
Business Friendliness	164	6	9
Access to Capital	72	15	15
Cost of Living	18	33	35
OVERALL	1512	5	3

CNBC: "America's Top States For Business 2011"
