= Williams Mullen =

American full-service law firm

Williams Mullen P.C.
- Headquarters: Richmond, Virginia
- No. of offices: 6
- No. of attorneys: 250+
- Key people: Calvin W. "Woody" Fowler Jr. (CEO)
- Date founded: 1909
- Founder: Lewis C. Williams; James Mullen
- Website: www.williamsmullen.com

Williams Mullen is an American law firm with offices across North Carolina, South Carolina, and Virginia. Founded in 1909 by attorneys Lewis Williams and James Mullen in a single office in Richmond, Virginia, the firm employs over 240 attorneys. According to Virginia Business magazine, it is the third-largest law firm in Virginia based on attorney headcount.

The firm provides legal services in various areas of corporate law, including banking and finance, intellectual property, litigation, real estate, and tax law.

== History ==
In January 2007 Williams Mullen announced that it would merge with Maupin Taylor, P.A., a North Carolina firm of about 50 lawyers that had been operating since 1870. The merger took effect on March 1 and created a firm of roughly 300 lawyers and 700 employees. The combined firm kept the Williams Mullen name, with the North Carolina offices trading as Williams Mullen Maupin Taylor during a transition period, and Julious P. Smith Jr. continued as chairman and chief executive.

== Finances ==
For its 2025 fiscal year, which ended on January 31, 2026, Williams Mullen reported gross revenue of $209.05 million, an increase of 7 percent, with revenue per lawyer of $847,000 and average profits per equity partner of $1.16 million. Head count was almost unchanged at 247 attorneys. Chairman and chief executive Woody Fowler attributed most of the growth to increases in billing rates, and cited demand in the firm's finance and real estate, litigation and mergers and acquisitions practices.
