= Bill Janis =

American politician (born 1962)

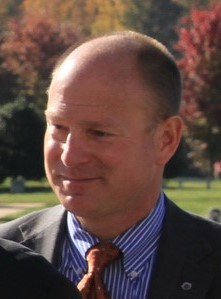

Member of the Virginia House of Delegates from the 56th district
- In office January 9, 2002 – January 11, 2012
- Preceded by: V. Earl Dickinson
- Succeeded by: Peter Farrell

Personal details
- Born: William Robert Janis; October 15, 1962 (age 63) Chicago, Illinois, U.S.
- Party: Republican
- Spouse: Rose Ann Hunter
- Children: 2
- Education: Virginia Military Institute; University of Virginia
- Profession: Lawyer

Military service
- Allegiance: United States
- Branch/service: United States Navy
- Years of service: 1984–1995
- Rank: Lieutenant commander
- Battles/wars: Gulf War
- Awards: Meritorious Service Medal; Navy Commendation Medal

William Robert Janis (born October 15, 1962) is an American politician of the Republican Party. From 2002 to 2012, he was a member of the Virginia House of Delegates. He represented the 56th district west of Richmond, including Goochland and Louisa counties and part of Henrico County.
