= Virginia's 72nd House of Delegates district =

Virginia legislative district

District map from the 2023 election

Virginia's 72nd House of Delegates district elects one of 100 seats in the Virginia House of Delegates, the lower house of the state's bicameral legislature. District 72, in Southside, Virginia, is represented by Republican Lee Ware, who was first elected in 1997.

== District officeholders ==
Elections prior to 2023 were held under different district boundaries.

Years	Delegate	Party	Electoral history
January 17, 1998 – Present	Lee Ware	Republican	First elected in 1997
