= Virginia's 56th House of Delegates district =

Virginia legislative district

District map from the 2023 election

Virginia's 56th House of Delegates district elects one of 100 seats in the Virginia House of Delegates, the lower house of the state's bicameral legislature. District 56 includes all of Appomattox, Buckingham, Cumberland, and Fluvanna counties as well as portions of Goochland and Prince Edward counties. It has been represented by Republican Tom Garrett since 2024.
