= Samuel F. Wright =

Samuel F. Wright is a Washington DC–based attorney active in veterans issues. Wright lives in Arlington, Virginia.

== Military career ==
While a law student, Wright was commissioned in November 1973 as an ensign in the Naval Reserve, via the Navy's Judge Advocate General's Corps (JAGC) Student Program. After graduating from the University of Houston Law Center, he passed the Texas bar exam and reported to active duty in January 1977, and attended the Naval Justice School. In March 1980, he left active duty and joined the Naval Reserve JAGC Program. He reentered active duty multiple times, and accumulated more than a decade of full-time active duty service. He retired from the Navy Reserve on April 1, 2007, with the rank of captain.

== Legal career ==
In 1982, while continuing in the Naval Reserve, Wright joined the United States Department of Labor (DOL) as an attorney, where he litigated to enforce the Veterans' Reemployment Rights Law (VRR). That 1940 law gives individuals the right to reemployment after military service or training. Wright served on an interagency task force which recommended that Congress revise the VRR. In 1994, Congress passed the Uniformed Services Employment and Reemployment Rights Act (USERRA) to make those changes. In April 2008, Wright joined the law firm Tully Rinckey P.L.L.C. as a partner, with the U.S. Navy Veterans Association as a client. He announced his resignation from Tully Rinckey in January, 2009 and was no longer employed by Tully Rinckey by April 2009. He apparently started to work for the Reserve Officers Association as their attorney around that time, but continued to represent the U.S. Naval Veterans Association.

Wright serves as director of the National Defense Committee's Military/Veteran Re-employment Rights Project. He is also an advisor to the Overseas Vote Foundation.

== Lobbying for Navy Veterans Association ==
Wright played a prominent role in an effort to exempt the U.S. Navy Veterans Association (USNVA) from regulation in Virginia. On February 23, 2009, the Virginia Division of Consumer Protection barred from soliciting for donations because it had failed to register as a charity and to make the necessary financial disclosures. Wright was retained to get the USNVA the right to solicit in Virginia and worked with a man who claimed to be Bobby Thompson, the chief financial officer of USNVA. In March 2010, the St. Petersburg Times published a series indicating that the USNVA was a one-man operation fraudulently soliciting money as a veterans' charity. When asked by the St. Petersburg Times whether Wright had ever spoken with anyone at the USNVA other than Thompson, Wright refused to answer citing attorney-client privilege. In May 2009, Wright met with then-Attorney General Bill Mims to get the bar reversed, but on August 18, 2009, the USNVA received a letter stating that the attorney general concurred with the bar.

Following that letter, Thompson began to donate to Virginia politicians. In 2009, Thompson made $78,375 in political contributions. $67,500 was directed to Virginia politicians, with the largest share being $55,500 in contributions to the successful campaign of Virginia Attorney General Ken Cuccinelli (R). Thompson was Cuccinelli's second-largest campaign donor. Out of the $67,500 Virginia contributions, Thompson made only one $1,000 donation to a Democratic candidate. On May 7, 2009, Wright donated $100 to the campaign of David Foster for attorney general, and on October 6, he donated $100 to Cuccinelli.

When questions were initially raised about USNVA, all other Virginia politicians gave the contributions from Thompson to other veterans' organizations, but Cuccinelli initially did not, despite calls from Virginia Democrats. Cuccinelli's spokesman said "if Mr. Thompson was convicted of wrongdoing relative to the misappropriation of funds, and contributions to our campaign came from money that was supposed to go to active duty military or veterans, we would donate those contributions to military support organizations here in Virginia." A month later in June, a Cuccinelli spokesman said $55,500 would be set aside in a restricted account pending the outcome of the investigation into Thompson and USNVA.

On May 14, 2009, Thompson donated $2,000 to Del. Chris Jones (R), who chaired the House General Laws Committee. Wright later wrote Jones asking why USNVA could not solicit in Virginia. Jones investigated and responded in December 2009 that USNVA had not registered and that the Attorney General's Office had concurred in the regulator's determination.

In 2009, Thompson also made an unsolicited $1,000 contribution to Virginia Senator Patsy Ticer (D), the chair of the state senate committee with jurisdiction over the department which handles the registration of charities. Wright later contacted Ticer's office, asking for assistance to make it easier for the association to operate in Virginia. Ticer introduced Virginia Senate Bill 563 that, among other purposes, exempted tax-exempt veterans' organizations such as the USNVA from having to register with Virginia regulators. The bill was unanimously approved by the Virginia House and Senate. After receiving the Thompson contributions, Cuccinelli and Wright met on February 15, 2010, to discuss the legislation which had passed the state senate. After learning about the March St. Petersburg Times reports, Ticer asked Governor Bob McDonnell (R), who received a $5,000 contribution from Thompson, to veto the bill she sponsored. On April 11, 2010, Wright found out about Ticer's request and asked her to withdraw her veto request. However, the Governor signed the bill on April 12, 2010. The new law took effect on July 1, 2010. Both Senator Ticer and Governor McDonnell have given the contributions from Thompson to other veterans groups.

In a May 31, 2010, letter, Wright assured Ticer that the USNVA was a legitimate organization. However, in June 2010, Wright resigned as counsel for USNVA.

Officials in at least five states – New Mexico, Ohio, Hawaii, Missouri, and Florida – are investigating the association. The USNVA is currently banned from soliciting in at least the states of New Mexico and Hawaii. In August 2010, Ohio Attorney General Richard Cordray announced that a nationwide arrest warrant had issued for Bobby Thompson, who had stolen the identity and Social Security Number of a victim who was not connected to the USNVA. Corday stated, "We know he bilked Ohioans out of at least $1.9 million, and we estimate that nationally he collected at least $20 million."
