= Thomas Greason =

American politician (born 1970)

Thomas A. Greason

Member of the Virginia House of Delegates from the 32nd district
- In office January 13, 2010 – January 10, 2018
- Preceded by: David Poisson
- Succeeded by: David A. Reid

Personal details
- Born: September 16, 1970 (age 56) Fort Leavenworth, Kansas
- Party: Republican
- Spouse: Mary Elizabeth Burke
- Education: U.S. Military Academy; George Mason University
- Profession: Marketer, financial analyst
- Website: www.taggreason.com

Thomas Alexander "Tag" Greason (born September 16, 1970) is a former Republican member of the Virginia House of Delegates. He represents the 32nd district, which includes parts of Loudoun County. He first won election in 2009, defeating incumbent Democrat Dave Poisson. He was sworn in January 2010 in Richmond, Virginia. In the Virginia House of Delegates elections, 2017, he lost to David Reid.

== Early life and education ==
Greason was born as the youngest of four children to a United States Army officer at Fort Leavenworth, Kansas. Greason's family eventually moved to northern Virginia, where he graduated from Lake Braddock Secondary School in Fairfax County. He graduated from the United States Military Academy and served in the Army with the Corps of Engineers. After serving, he returned to Northern Virginia. He lives in Loudoun County with his wife, Mary Beth, and their three children. He is a marketer and financial analyst and serves as the Executive Vice President for Quality Technology Services.

== Political career ==
In November 2009, Greason defeated David Poisson for the 32nd District House of Delegates seat. Greason won 57 percent of the vote despite being outspent by over $100,000.

Greason was appointed to the House committees on Education, Finance, and Science and Technology.

In 2011, Greason was reelected after running unopposed.

In June 2013, the Democratic Party of Virginia nominated Elizabeth Miller to run against Greason in the November election. Greason won reelection 51.3% – 48.5%, a margin of 651 votes.

In the Virginia House of Delegates elections, 2017, he lost to David Reid.

== Legislative accomplishments ==
In 2011, Greason was the chief patron of legislation that guaranteed children with autism spectrum disorder would not be denied insurance coverage. The bill requires insurers to provide autism coverage for children ages 2 to 6 with a benefit cap of $35,000. The bill was signed into law by Gov. Bob McDonnell.

McDonnell (R) had originally signed a bill into law in 2011 mandating coverage, but Attorney General Ken Cuccinelli determined that the legislation contained imprecise language that legislators needed to correct. In 2012 Greason introduced clarifying language to rectify the situation and the bill was signed, again, by Gov. McDonnell on February 7, 2012.

In 2012, Greason was appointed to serve on the influential House Appropriations Committee after just one term in the House. He was also appointed to the House Committee on General Laws.

In 2015, Greason helped lead an effort in the General Assembly to allow Virginia public schools to let students who failed their end-of-year SOL tests to retake the tests. While retakes happened prior to 2015, this legislation required the Board of Education to create a uniform policy for expedited retakes on all SOL tests except for the writing test. This was bipartisan legislation that passed the General Assembly without a single no vote on the floor of either chamber.
