= Virginia's 32nd House of Delegates district =

Virginia legislative district

Virginia's 32nd State House of Delegates district
- District map from the 2023 election
Delegate
Bill Wiley; R–Frederick County
- Demographics: 74% White; 5% Black; 14% Hispanic; 2% Asian; 0% Native American; 0% Hawaiian/Pacific Islander; 1% Other; 4% Multiracial
- Population (2024) • Voting age: 86,471; 18
- Registered voters: 63,078

Virginia's 32nd House of Delegates district elects one of 100 seats in the Virginia House of Delegates, the lower house of the state's bicameral legislature. District 32, in Frederick County, has been represented by Bill Wiley since 2024.According to the 2010 census, the thirty-second district has a population of 80,268 with 56,252 registered voters.

== District officeholders ==
Years	Delegate	Party	Electoral history
January 8, 1992 – January 22, 1998	Bill Mims	Republican	Declined to run for reelection; elected to Virginia's 33rd Senate District Later elected Attorney General of Virginia; later appointed to the Supreme Court of Virginia
February 5, 1998 – January 11, 2006	Dick Black	Republican	Defeated in bid for reelection; later elected to Virginia's 13th Senate District
January 11, 2006 – January 13, 2010	David Poisson	Democratic	Defeated in bid for reelection
January 13, 2010 – January 10, 2018	Tag Greason	Republican	Defeated in bid for reelection
January 10, 2018 – January 10, 2024	David Reid	Democratic	First elected in 2017
January 10, 2024 – present	Bill Wiley	republican	First elected in 2023

== Electoral history ==
Date	Election	Candidate	Party	Votes	%
Virginia House of Delegates, 32nd district
Nov 8, 2005	General	David E. Poisson	Democratic	12,469	52.99
Nov 8, 2005	General	R H Black	Republican	11,034	46.89
Nov 8, 2005	General	Write Ins		28	0.12
Nov 8, 2005	General	Incumbent lost; seat switched from Republican to Democratic			
Nov 6, 2007	General	David E. Poisson	Democratic	10,504	52.84
Nov 6, 2007	General	Lynn C. Chapman	Republican	9,358	47.08
Nov 6, 2007	General	Write Ins		14	0.07
Nov 3, 2009	General	Thomas A. "Tag" Greason	Republican	14,552	57.47
Nov 3, 2009	General	David E. Poisson	Democratic	10,739	42.41
Nov 3, 2009	General	Write Ins		30	0.11
Nov 3, 2009	General	Incumbent lost; seat switched from Democratic to Republican			
