= Dick Black (politician) =

American politician (born 1944)

Richard Black

Member of the Virginia Senate from the 13th district
- In office January 11, 2012 – January 8, 2020
- Preceded by: Fred Quayle
- Succeeded by: John Bell

Member of the Virginia House of Delegates from the 32nd district
- In office February 5, 1998 – January 3, 2006
- Preceded by: Bill Mims
- Succeeded by: David Poisson

Personal details
- Born: Richard Hayden Black; May 15, 1944 (age 82) Northern Virginia, U.S.
- Party: Republican
- Spouse: Barbara Jean Hale
- Education: University of Florida (B.S., J.D.); U.S. Army War College
- Committees: Agriculture, Conservation and Natural Resources, General Laws and Technology, Education and Health, Rehabilitation and Social Services
- Website: http://www.senatorblack.com/

Military service
- Allegiance: United States of America
- Branch/service: United States Marine Corps; United States Army
- Years of service: 1963–1970 (USMC); 1976–1994 (USA)
- Rank: Colonel
- Unit: J.A.G. Corps
- Battles/wars: Vietnam War

Richard Hayden Black (born May 15, 1944) is an American politician. A Republican, he served as a member of the Virginia State Senate, representing the 13th District, which encompasses parts of both Loudoun and Prince William Counties, from 2012 to 2020. Black was previously a member of the Virginia House of Delegates from years 1998 to 2006. Black announced that he would not seek re-election in 2019, instead retiring at the end of his term.

== Early life ==
Black was born in northern Virginia in 1944 and grew up in Miami as the middle of three children. His father was an IRS agent who helped investigate organized crime. Black's first job was working at the Miami Serpentarium, importing cobras, vipers and other venomous snakes, and preparing them for transport to zoos throughout the world. He graduated from high school in 1962 and studied at the University of Miami for a year before enlisting in the Marine Corps. After completing his service in the Vietnam War, Black returned to school, earning a BSBA in Accounting in 1973 and a JD in 1976, both from the University of Florida.

== Military career ==
Black was a career military officer. He served in both the U.S. Marines and in the U.S. Army as a lawyer. He served a total of 31 years active and reserve, rising from the rank of private to colonel. He is a graduate of the U.S. Army War College, Command and General Staff College, and Naval Aviator's Flight School.

Black enlisted in the Marines in 1963 at the age of 19. He graduated from Parris Island as a PFC and entered the Marine Aviation Cadet Program at Naval Air Station Pensacola. He was commissioned a second lieutenant. in 1965.

=== Vietnam ===
Black served as a pilot in the US Marines during the Vietnam War, earning the Purple Heart medal. He flew 269 combat helicopter missions with HMM-362, which operated out of Ky Ha, Vietnam.

From 11 February to 17 June 1967, he served as Forward Air Controller (FAC) for the 1st Marine Regiment, making 70 combat patrols. He engaged in intense combat around Nui Loc Son in April 1967. He received the Navy Commendation Medal with "V" for valor, while serving as FAC for 2nd Battalion, 1st Marine Regiment. Lt. Black volunteered to join Fox Company, 1st Marines, which held the ridgeline at Nui Loc Son—an extremely dangerous and remote outpost in the Que Son Valley.

=== Judge Advocate General (JAG) Corps ===
After the war, he left the service and graduated from law school, returning to military service as a prosecutor with the U.S. Army Judge Advocate General's Corps. Black later headed the Army's Criminal Law Division at the Pentagon, before retiring from the military in 1994.

== Political career ==
Black first held elective office on the Loudoun County Library Board, where in 1997 he authored a policy that blocked pornography on library computers. The policy drew national attention and First Amendment litigation struck down the policy.

The United States Supreme Court ruled in 2003 in US v. American Library Association that public libraries' use of Internet filtering software does not violate their patrons' First Amendment rights. Today Loudoun County Public libraries do contain internet filters, but allow adult patrons to turn them off provided they read and sign the LCPL Adult Internet Use Agreement to register to use the Internet, and by doing so agree to comply with library policies and guidelines which prohibit the viewing of pornographic materials.

=== Virginia House of Delegates ===
Black was first elected to the Virginia House in a special election in 1998 to succeed Republican Delegate Bill Mims, who had been elected to the Virginia Senate. Black resigned from the Library Board a few months after being sworn-in. A "deeply conservative" delegate, Black became well known for making controversial statements.

In 2001, Black sponsored a bill to require internet filters on the computers in public schools. The bill passed overwhelmingly in both the House and Senate and was signed into law in March, 2001.

During the 2001 Legislative session, Black dealt with a number of abortion related bills. In February 2001, he co-sponsored a bill to establish a 24-hour "informed consent" waiting period for women seeking an abortion. The bill required a clinic or hospital to tell a woman seeking an abortion the approximate age of the fetus, details of the abortion procedure and other options available to her. The bill eventually passed and was signed into law.

Also during the 2001 session, Black opposed a bill that would allow the "morning-after pill" to be dispensed at pharmacies. Opponents of the bill said that, unlike normal contraceptives that prevent the fertilization of an egg, these types of emergency contraceptives can act as an abortifacient, preventing a fertilized egg from attaching to the uterine wall. "This is a baby pesticide we're looking at. It's a toxic method of eliminating a child," said Black. Although the bill failed to become law, the morning-after pill can be purchased in Virginia from pharmacies without a prescription by people ages 17 or older and with a prescription for those 16 and younger, and one brand is available over-the-counter for people of all ages without ID.

In February 2002, Black opposed making marital rape a crime, saying that it was impossible to convict a man "when they're living together, sleeping in the same bed, she's in a nightie, and so forth, there’s no injury, there’s no separation or anything".

==== Route 28 Corridor Improvements ====
During the 2002 Session, Black successfully passed HB 735 – Transportation Improvement Districts. The bill was designed to allow property along the Route 28 corridor to be included in multiple special tax districts. This was necessary because some of the property was already in an existing special tax district and the landowners along Route 28 were looking to create a new transportation improvement district to change this major corridor into a high speed freeway.

In late 2002 and early 2003, Black opposed erecting a statue of Abraham Lincoln and his son Thomas at the Tredegar Iron Works to commemorate Lincoln's visit to Richmond on April 4, 1865, 10 days before his assassination. Black said, "Putting a statue to [Lincoln] there is sort of like putting the Confederate flag at the Lincoln Memorial."

In July 2003, Black proposed legislation that would prevent unmarried and gay couples from applying for low-interest home mortgages, saying that the state was "spending $90 million to subsidize sodomy and adultery. I just don't understand why we are taking money away [from worthwhile programs] and supporting a radical homosexual agenda."

Also in 2003, delivered plastic fetus dolls to fellow delegates and senators. Black used the dolls to generate publicity for his bill requiring Parental consent for a minor to get an abortion. Black's bill, HB 1402, passed and was signed into law.

In February 2005, he urged his constituents to picket Stone Bridge High School for putting on a play about a gay football player, claiming that the school was "being used to promote a homosexual lifestyle." He further claimed that attempts to "encourage homosexual activity, to portray it in a cute or favorable light" could lead to children contracting HIV. In 2004, he said with regard to Virginia's sodomy law: "If I'm the last person on the face of this Earth to vote against legalizing sodomy, I'll do it."

==== Ollin Crawford ====
During his time in the Virginia House of Delegates, Black was also involved with advocating for clemency on behalf of Ollin Crawford. Crawford, known as the "grenade lady," was serving a 70-year sentence after she committed a series of robberies where she claimed to have a grenade stuffed into a sock. No one was injured in any of the four robberies. Because the Dept. of Corrections classified Crawford as a "three-time loser," she was ineligible for parole.

Black's interest in the case came from what he felt was a discrepancy in the way Crawford was treated and a similar case where Sue Kennon, a suburban housewife, committed four armed robberies with a toy pistol. Kennon was granted parole in 2001 after serving 14 years of a 48-year sentence. In pointing out the similarities of the case, but the difference in outcome, Black said. “I don't believe there was deliberate discrimination, but reasonable people might ask why a poor black woman hasn't received the same consideration as an affluent white woman. We do know that two women with very similar cases received vastly different treatment.”

Black advocated on Crawford's behalf for 10 years, starting in 1997. He requested clemency for Crawford from three different Virginia Governors, including George Allen (American politician) and Mark Warner. Finally, Tim Kaine granted clemency and Crawford was released in early 2008.

Black was defeated in his quest for a fifth term by Democrat David Poisson in 2005. Poisson defeated him 53%–47%. Black ran for the Republican nomination in the special election for Virginia's 1st congressional district in October 2007. A convention was held to determine the nominee and Black came fifth eliminated in the fourth ballot. State Delegate Rob Wittman was picked and went on to win the election.

=== Virginia Senate ===
Black ran for the State Senate in 2011 in the newly created 13th district, which encompasses nearly half of Loudoun County and a portion of Prince William County. His former home had been in another portion of Loudoun County represented in the State Senate by Democrat Mark Herring. Black won a hard-fought three-way primary, taking 3,143 votes (38.83%) to John Stirrup's 3,029 votes (37.42%) and Robert S. Fitzsimmonds' 1,923 votes (23.76%). In the general election, Black handily defeated Democrat Shawn Mitchell by 57% to 43%.

In an interview in December 2013, Black compared same-sex marriage to polygamy and incest, saying that although he opposed polygamy, "at least it functions biologically", adding that it was "just more natural" than homosexuality.

In 2014, Black briefly ran for Virginia's 10th congressional district in the 2014 elections to succeed retiring Republican incumbent Frank Wolf. He withdrew on January 23, two days after declaring his candidacy, saying: "after meeting with Republican Caucus leaders in Richmond, it is imperative that I remain in the Senate where I am needed to maintain our 20/20 split." Although the Virginia Senate was split 20/20, Democrats held the majority as Ralph Northam, the Democratic Lieutenant Governor of Virginia, cast tie-breaking votes.

In January 2019, Black announced he would not seek reelection for his State Senate seat in the 2019 Virginia legislative elections and instead retire at the end of his term.

==== Syria ====
In April 2014, Black sent an official letter to Syrian President Bashar al-Assad, thanking "the Syrian Arab Army for its heroic rescue of Christians in the Qalamoun Mountain Range", praising Assad for "treating with respect all Christians and the small community of Jews in Damascus," and stating it was obvious that the rebel side of the war was largely being fought by "vicious war criminals linked to Al Qaeda" Democratic State Senator A. Donald McEachin called the letter "bizarre," while Republican State Senator Bill Stanley later joked "What's the matter, Dick? Was Kim Jong-un not returning your text messages?".

In 2015 Islamic State included Black in a list of its enemies, calling him "The American Crusader." It quoted the following statement by Black: "One thing is clear, if Damascus falls, the dreaded black and white flag of ISIS will fly over Damascus. ... Within a period of months after the fall of Damascus, Jordan will fall and Lebanon will fall. ... I think you will automatically see a beginning of a historic push of Islam towards Europe and I think, ultimately, Europe will be conquered."

On April 27, 2016, Black began a three-day trip to Syria in support of its government. Explaining his trip in a series of Twitter exchanges with The Washington Post, Black wrote that the United States was "allied with two of the most vile nations on earth, Saudi Arabia and Turkey, which are intent on imposing a [Wahhabi] fundamentalist government on the Syrian people."

In 2018, Black said on the Lebanese satellite channel Al Mayadeen, which supports the Syrian government, that the British intelligence service, MI6, was planning a false flag chemical weapons attack on Syria, which it would then blame on the Syrian government.

==== Ukraine ====
A July 2022 video entry on his website entitled "Ukraine has lost the War" shows Black speaking to a meeting of elected Alternative for Germany AfD party members, where Black began by stating that his personal opinions about the war might be controversial, and in December of that year he posted a tweet about freedom of worship in Ukraine. In 2023 Black stated that the 2014 Maidan revolution had been a coup, staged by the US, and in a video entitled "We [The United States and NATO] do not care how many Ukrainian die - not civilians, not soldiers" he compared the war to a football game.

==== Medicaid expansion ====
Black introduced a budget amendment to the General Assembly to prohibit Medicaid expansion without the legislature's approval. He led a conservative revolt against Medicaid expansion that inspired the Twitter hashtag #BlackorBust. After a full day of heated back-door debates, Black prevailed and the Senate approved a budget without Medicaid expansion, which was Democratic Governor Terry McAuliffe's signature issue. McAuliffe vowed not to sign a budget without it.

On June 20, 2014, McAuliffe announced he would veto the Black or Bust amendment. But his attempted veto of the Black or Bust Medicaid Amendment failed when his veto was ruled unlawful by the Speaker.

=== Media appearances ===
Black has made appearances on Russian, Israeli and Chinese state-run and Hezbollah-affiliated media critiquing US foreign policy.

== Post-Senate ==
Black is an associate member of Veteran Intelligence Professionals for Sanity.

On June 22, 2021 at a Loudoun County Public Schools board meeting, Black argued against Policy 8040, mandating that teachers refer to students by pronouns matching their gender identity, and accused the board of suppressing free speech. After his minute of allotted time concluded and his microphone was disabled, he continued speaking while chaos erupted from the crowd. The board subsequently moved to end public comments, he being the 51st speaker among the 259 who had registered.

On February 13, 2023 Black gave an interview George Galloway on his Radio Sputnik show The Mother of All Talk Shows, discussing the Nord Stream gas pipeline. Black referred to an article by Seymour Hersh blaming the US and hailed Hersh as a most meticulous journalist. Black qualified the bombing of Nord Stream as a "terrorist act" and an "act of war" against US ally Germany.
