= Bill Wiley =

American politician (born 1971)

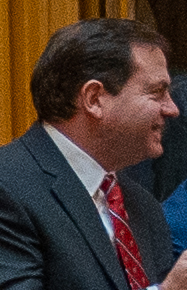

Member of the Virginia House of Delegates
- Incumbent
- Assumed office November 19, 2020
- Preceded by: Chris Collins
- Constituency: 29th district (2020–2024); 32nd district (2024–present)

Personal details
- Born: 1971 (age 54–55) Roanoke, Virginia, U.S.
- Party: Republican
- Spouse: Kathryn Clarke Wiley
- Children: 3
- Education: George Mason University (BS, MEd)
- Profession: Businessman; Realtor
- Website: electbillwiley.com

Military service
- Allegiance: United States
- Branch: United States Army
- Service years: 1990–1998
- Unit: Virginia Army National Guard

William D. Wiley (born 1971) is an American politician and member of the Republican Party. In 2020 he was elected to the Virginia House of Delegates. He represents the 32nd district, comprising the city of Winchester, and parts of Warren and Frederick Counties in Virginia. Before his election to the House of Delegates, Wiley spent six years on the Winchester City Council.

== Career ==
After moving with his wife to Winchester, Virginia, Wiley spent several years on the city's Board of Zoning Appeals and Planning Commission. In 2014 Wiley ran for the city council and was elected without opposition. From January 2018 onwards, Wiley was president of the city council. Wiley ran for re-election in 2018, defeating Democratic challenger Teri Merrill by a 55% to 44% margin.

In June 2020, incumbent Virginia state delegate Chris Collins resigned from his seat to accept a state judgeship, and Wiley announced that he would run in the ensuing special election. Wiley won the Republican Party nomination for the seat in an August 8 firehouse primary, defeating former Warren County supervisor Richard Traczyk. The Democratic Party nominated attorney Irina Khanin. In the November general election, Wiley defeated Khanin by a 64–36 margin.

Wiley works as a business development manager for a general contracting and construction firm, and as an associate real estate broker.
