= Richard Baxter Gilliam =

American businessman

Richard Baxter Gilliam is an American executive and founder of the Abingdon, Virginia-based coal extractor Cumberland Resources. Cumberland Resources Corporation employed over 1,200 individuals in Southwestern Virginia and Eastern Kentucky. In 2010, Gilliam sold Cumberland Resources to Massey Energy (currently Alpha Natural Resources) for $960 million. Gilliam gave away over $80 million to his employees following the sale of his company. In 2011, Gilliam and his wife, Leslie Flanary Gilliam, established The Richard and Leslie Gilliam Foundation.

== Public activity ==
Gilliam is a major conservative donor in Virginia, giving $750,000 in 2012 to American Crossroads and to Restore Our Future. In 2009, Gilliam was the fifth largest donor to the campaign of Virginia governor Bob McDonnell. In November 2010, McDonnell appointed Gilliam to the state's Advisory Council on Revenue Estimates. Gilliam was also a top donor to Ken Cuccinelli's 2013 gubernatorial campaign.

In 2018, Gilliam announced a $5.2 million commitment to James Madison University to establish the Center for Entrepreneurship. The center will be named for his late wife, Leslie Flanary Gilliam.
