= Electoral history of Bob McDonnell =

List of elections featuring Bob McDonnell as a candidate

Bob McDonnell served as Governor of Virginia from January 16, 2010, to January 11, 2014. Before serving as governor, McDonnell served as Virginia Attorney General from 2006 to 2010 and in the Virginia House of Delegates from 1992 to 2006.

Virginia Gubernatorial Election, 2009
Party	Candidate	Votes	%
Republican	Bob McDonnell	1,163,523	58.61
Democratic	Creigh Deeds	818,909	41.25
Independent	Write-in candidates	2,502	0.12
Total votes		1,984,934	100
Turnout		1,984,934 of 4,955,755	40.05

Virginia Attorney General Election, 2005
Party	Candidate	Votes	%
Republican	Bob McDonnell	970,886	49.96
Democratic	Creigh Deeds	970,563	49.95
Independent	Write-in candidates	1,801	0.09
Total votes		1,943,250	100
Turnout		2,000,052 of 4,448,852	44.96

Virginia House of Delegates General Election, 2003
Party	Candidate	Votes	%
Republican	Bob McDonnell	4,329	96.03
Independent	Write-in candidates	179	3.97
Total votes		4,508	100

Virginia House of Delegates General Election, 2001
Party	Candidate	Votes	%
Republican	Bob McDonnell	10,727	98.12
Independent	Write-in candidates	205	1.88
Total votes		10,932	100

Virginia House of Delegates General Election, 1999
Party	Candidate	Votes	%
Republican	Bob McDonnell	6,347	55.27
Democratic	Frank Drew	5,122	44.61
Total votes		11,483	100

Virginia House of Delegates General Election, 1997
Party	Candidate	Votes	%
Republican	Bob McDonnell	10,105	98.5
Independent	Write-in candidates	151	1.5
Total votes		10,256	100

Virginia House of Delegates General Election, 1995
Party	Candidate	Votes	%
Republican	Bob McDonnell	5,267	99.10
Independent	Write-in candidates	48	0.90
Total votes		5,315	100

Virginia House of Delegates General Election, 1993
Party	Candidate	Votes	%
Republican	Bob McDonnell	6,904	64.45
Democratic	Thomas Carnes	3,807	35.54
Independent	Write-in candidates	2	0.01
Total votes		10,713	100

Virginia House of Delegates General Election, 1991
Party	Candidate	Votes	%
Republican	Bob McDonnell	3,811	52.75
Democratic	Glenn McClanan	3,410	47.20
Independent	Write-in candidates	3	0.05
Total votes		10,713	100
