= John Donald Cody =

Convicted felon

- Born: August 3, 1947 (age 79)
- Other names: Bobby Thompson, among many others
- Occupations: Attorney (disbarred), Former U.S. Army intelligence officer
- Status: Ohio Department of Rehabilitation and Correction #A651040, incarcerated at Richland Correctional Institution, Mansfield, Ohio; earliest release date April 27, 2039
- Conviction: November 14, 2013
- Criminal charges: Larceny, money laundering, identity fraud, engaging in a pattern of corrupt activity, tampering with records
- Penalty: 28 years in prison (with 28 days to be served in solitary confinement), $6.3 million fine (one year of sentence and solitary confinement requirement vacated on June 12, 2015)

John Donald Cody is a convicted felon who perpetrated several fraudulent activities across the United States since the 1980s. He disappeared from his law practice in Arizona in 1984 after investigators began looking into his activities, suspecting the theft of client funds. In the 2000s, using the alias Bobby Thompson, he ran a fraudulent charity named the United States Navy Veterans Association from Florida. After evading authorities for two years, he was arrested in 2012 on charges associated with fraud and identify theft and ultimately convicted, receiving a sentence of 28 years of prison.

== Early life and education ==
Cody was born in Hoboken, New Jersey to John V. Cody, a bank teller, and Herminia, a bookkeeper. He has one younger sister. Cody graduated from Steinert High School in 1965.

Cody graduated from the University of Virginia in 1969 and Harvard Law School in 1972.

== Early career and military service ==
Cody worked in a number of law firms and served in the U.S. Army Reserves after graduating from law school and separated from the service as a Captain. He reportedly had been stationed in Washington, D.C., Hawaii and the Philippines, and was in military intelligence. In 1979, Cody received a master's degree in management at the Asian Institute of Management in Manila.

== Law practice in Arizona ==
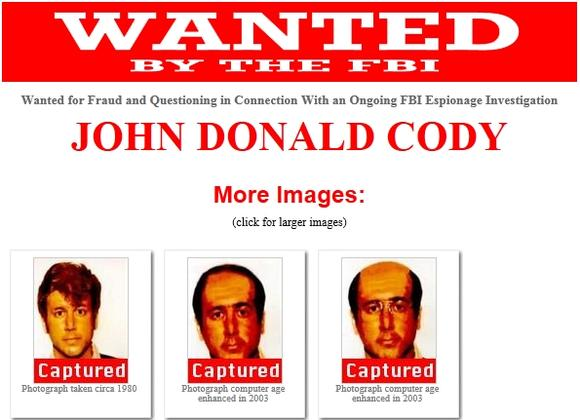
An FBI Wanted poster for Cody after his Arizona disappearance. The image was updated to indicate his 2012 capture. No other information about the espionage investigation has ever been made public.

In 1980, Cody moved to Sierra Vista, Arizona, where he opened a law office and earned a reputation as an aggressive defense attorney willing to take on cases for indigents. He was described by those that interacted with him as displaying extremely erratic behavior, and he developed an antagonistic relationship with the County Attorney's Office. Called both "brilliant" and "crazy" by those who knew him, he sometimes scored unexpected successes for his clients. In one case, a female client was acquitted on self-defense after she shot her boyfriend in the face while he was eating cereal. Another client was found innocent by reason of insanity after stabbing a man 23 times.

An employee became suspicious when Cody asked her to make several $5,000 withdrawals from his accounts, all in $20 bills. When he asked her if she knew anyone who made fake IDs, she left his employment. A few months later in May 1984, Cody told his new assistant he had an emergency meeting in Tucson. His orange Corvette, painted blue, was found weeks later at the Phoenix airport with the keys in the ignition. Shortly after his disappearance, Cochise County officials charged Cody with stealing about $100,000 from clients' accounts. Many townspeople doubted that was enough to make him abandon a seemingly successful practice. An FBI Wanted poster was released, saying Cody was wanted for fraud and espionage. Whatever his true reasons for fleeing, his whereabouts were not discovered for decades.

== United States Navy Veterans Association ==
United States Navy Veterans Association
- Founded: 2002 (first tax filing)
- Dissolved: Ceased fundraising in 2010
- Type: Veterans' Organization; 501(c)(19)
- Location: Washington, D.C.
- Region served: United States
- Key people: John Donald Cody, alias "Bobby Thompson"
- Revenue: $22.4 million (2008)
- Website: Archive

Cody, under the stolen identity of "Bobby Thompson", established the United States Navy Veterans Association (USNVA) as a tax-exempt veterans' organization that first filed paperwork with the IRS in 2002. It claimed to have a national headquarters in Washington, D.C. and that its purpose was to support the U.S. Navy, and to assist veterans and members of the U.S. Armed Forces, and their families. In fact, Cody was the mastermind behind all of the organization's filings, doing so from his apartment in Tampa, Florida.

The Association raised millions of dollars through the use of hiring telemarketers that charged a high percent charge – as high as 85% – of all funds raised. The Association made several donations to needy veterans or other charities only after the Association was questioned by reporters, and there was no systematic program established by the Association to benefit veterans or their families. A large part of the money was used to make contributions to politicians across the country, which culminated in Cody (as Bobby Thompson) being photographed with prominent Republican politicians, including George W. Bush, John Boehner, John McCain, Rudy Giuliani, and Karl Rove.

USNVA was the subject of a 2010 investigative report by the St. Petersburg Times now called the Tampa Bay Times, which concluded that the USNVA was a one-man operation fraudulently soliciting money as a veterans' charity. The Times investigation ultimately resulted in criminal and administrative investigations in several states and the removal of USNVA's listing from the U.S. Department of Veterans Affairs website. The organization's national headquarters in Washington, D.C. proved to be a rented post office box, rather than an actual physical office location.

After the initial in-person inquiry by the reporters at his residence, Cody quickly moved out of his apartment to evade scrutiny from press and authorities and continued to run the USNVA operation through hired assistants and attorneys until authorities had all Association activities cease.

=== Organization overview ===
The USNVA was a tax-exempt organization headquartered in Washington, D.C. It received tax-exempt status from the IRS as a 501(c)(19) veterans' organization.

USNVA claimed to be the current form of charitable groups that date back to 1927, although the USNVA itself first filed with the Internal Revenue Service in 2002. The Association claimed 66,000 members.

The Association's stated mission, in summary, was to: Support the U.S. Navy; provide assistance to war veterans, members of the U.S. Armed Forces, and their families; and "the support of legislative action to provide to our service personnel, veterans, and their dependents, widows and orphans, the remuneration and benefits they truly deserve."

According to the Association's amateurish but large website, there were 41 state Chapters, along with Chapters in Washington, D.C. and Puerto Rico and Divisions in Panama and the Philippines. However, the New Mexico Attorney General claims that the addresses given for the New Mexico chapter are for vacant lots.

The USNVA website listed the MacMurray, Petersen & Shuster LLP law firm in New Albany, Ohio as its General Counsel; Legislative Associates, Inc. of Stillwater, Minnesota as its Legislative and Public Policy Counsel, and Rubin & Associates, P.A. of St. Petersburg, Florida as its Special Counsel. It also hired additional lobbyists to gain the right to solicit in Virginia. These parties continued to work and lobby on behalf of the Association even after the publication of the St. Petersburg Times' investigative reporting.

=== Investigative reporting ===
After a six-month investigation, the St. Petersburg Times published a series of specials about the USNVA starting on March 21, 2010. Among its findings:

- Of the 85 Association officers listed on IRS filings, Thompson was the only one could be located. He identified himself as a retired Lieutenant Commander in the U.S. Navy Reserve, although no records could be found to support the claim.
- The Association, in communications through its Ohio-based lawyer, refused to allow the reporters to speak with any other Association officer.
- The Association claimed $22.4 million in revenue in 2008, but refused to show reporters any detailed information about how the money was spent.
- Even though the Association said its five-member executive board and 12 key officers worked out of the national headquarters on M Street in Washington D.C., the Association's headquarters address is a rented mailbox at a UPS Store.
- An audit USNVA submitted to the Better Business Bureau was rejected because it did not meet Generally Accepted Accounting Principles and had other irregularities. The audit was allegedly signed by a CPA located at the World Trade Center in New Orleans. Neither the building managers, state of Louisiana, or the Society of Louisiana CPAs had any record of the listed accountant.
- The Association used telemarketers as a fundraising tool. Some of the Association's contracts stipulated that for every pledge, the telemarketing company kept 60 percent, well above the preferred norm of 12 to 13 percent.
- The group claimed to send 24,000 care packages at a cost of $8.4 million to deployed U.S. servicemembers, but instead it was caught claiming credit and copying thank you notes for care packages sent by others organizations.

Times reporters spoke with Mr. Thompson at his residence once. On a later visit in December 2009, his leased residence was found vacant; according to the landlord, no forwarding address was provided.

In response, the USNVA's attorney relayed Thompson's denials all of the Times' assertions, calling the investigation "flawed," and saying USNVA officers did not want to speak to the Times reporters because of their "disreputable tactics and stories and biases."

Attorneys paid by Thompson supposedly on behalf of the association, including Helen Mac Murray of Ohio and Samuel F. Wright of Virginia, declined to say to reporters if they had ever spoken to any Navy Veterans directors other than Thompson.

=== Virginia contributions and exemption ===
On February 23, 2009, the Virginia Division of Consumer Protection barred USNVA from soliciting for donations because it had failed to register as a charity and to make the necessary financial disclosures. Samuel F. Wright, a Washington-based lawyer, was retained to get the USNVA the right to solicit in Virginia, and he worked with a man who claimed to be Bobby Thompson, the Chief Financial Officer of USNVA. When asked by the St. Petersburg Times whether Wright had ever spoken with anyone at the USNVA other than Thompson, Wright refused to answer citing attorney-client privilege. In May 2009, Wright met with then-Attorney General Bill Mims to discuss requesting an exemption from the requirement to register, but on 18 August 2009, the USNVA received a letter stating that the Attorney General concurred with not granting the organization an exemption.

Following that letter, Thompson, who was a Florida resident, began to donate to Virginia politicians. In 2009, Mr. Thompson made $78,375 in political contributions. $67,500 was directed to Virginia politicians, with the largest share being $55,500 in contributions to the successful campaign of Virginia Attorney General Ken Cuccinelli (R). Thompson was Cuccinelli's second-largest campaign donor. Out of the $67,500 Virginia contributions, Thompson made only one $1,000 donation to a Democratic candidate.

When questions were raised about USNVA in May 2010, all other Virginia politicians gave the contributions from Thompson to other veterans' organizations, but Cuccinelli initially did not, despite calls from Virginia Democrats. Cuccinelli's spokesman said "if Mr. Thompson was convicted of wrongdoing relative to the misappropriation of funds, and contributions to our campaign came from money that was supposed to go to active duty military or veterans, we would donate those contributions to military support organizations here in Virginia." A month later in June, a Cuccinelli spokesman said $55,500 would be set aside in a restricted account pending the outcome of the investigation into Thompson and USNVA.

Thompson also made an unsolicited $1,000 contribution to Virginia Senator Patsy Ticer (D) in 2009. Wright later contacted Ticer's office, asking for assistance to make it easier for the Association to operate in Virginia. Ticer introduced Virginia Senate Bill 563 in 2010 that, among other purposes, exempted tax-exempt veterans' organizations such as the USNVA from having to register with Virginia regulators. The bill was unanimously approved by the Virginia House and Senate. After receiving the Thompson contributions, Cuccinelli met with Wright on February 15, 2010 to discuss the legislation which had passed the State Senate. After learning about the March St. Petersburg Times reports, Ticer asked Governor Bob McDonnell (R), who received a $5,000 contribution from Thompson, to veto the bill she sponsored. On April 11, 2010, Wright asked Ticer to withdraw her veto request. However, the Governor signed the bill on April 12, 2010. The new law took effect on July 1, 2010. Both Ticer and McDonnell have given the contributions from Thompson to other veterans groups.

=== Removal from VA website and banning ===
In May 2010, U.S. Senator Jim Webb (D-VA) wrote a letter to the U.S. Department of Veterans Affairs asking for the removal of the U.S. Navy Veterans Association's listing from the VA website of veterans organizations, citing recent media reports and official investigations. The VA removed the listing by the next day, noting that listing an organization does not constitute an endorsement. Officials in several states investigated and banned the USNVA from soliciting in their states as a result of published allegations about the organization.

== Investigations and prosecutions ==
2010 Wanted poster issued by the Ohio Attorney General before "Thompson" was known to be Cody

In August 2010, Ohio Attorney General Richard Cordray announced that a nationwide arrest warrant had been issued for the man known as Bobby Thompson, who had stolen the identity and Social Security Number of a victim who was not connected to the USNVA. Cordray stated, "We know he bilked Ohioans out of at least $1.9 million, and we estimate that nationally he collected at least $20 million."

In June 2011, Blanca Contreras of Tampa, Florida, pleaded guilty to engaging in a pattern of corrupt activity, aggravated theft, money laundering, and tampering with records in connection with her four-year involvement with the organization. She was sentenced to five years in prison and faces deportation to her native Mexico upon her release. In exchange for her guilty plea, her two adult daughters, who had also been involved with the organization, received immunity.

After a two-year search, the man known as "Bobby Thompson" was arrested on April 30, 2012 in Portland, Oregon. He pleaded not guilty to 22 charges related to the alleged scam, but initially refused to provide his identity, instead signing his name with an "X". In October 2012, authorities announced that they believed "Thompson" was really John Donald Cody. It was also revealed that Cody had been a fugitive since 1987, when he was indicted on federal charges of bilking two women's estates of $99,000 by using traveler's checks. U. S. Marshal Pete Elliott said that "Thompson's" fingerprints matched prints from Cody in a 1969 military fingerprint database.

On November 14, 2013, after a six-week trial before Cuyahoga County Common Pleas Judge Steven Gall, Cody was found guilty of 23 charges including theft, money laundering, engaging in a pattern of corrupt activity, tampering with records, and identity fraud. On December 16, Gall sentenced Cody to 28 years in prison and ordered him to pay more than $6.3 million in fines and investigation costs. Citing the damage done to veterans who could have been aided by the money that Thompson's charity raised, Judge Gall ordered Cody to spend each Veterans Day (November 11) in solitary confinement for the duration of his prison term.

In 2015, the 8th Ohio District Court of Appeals reduced Cody's sentence by one year to 27 years based on the determination that Ohio courts did not have jurisdiction for 11 of the identity theft charges. The court also dropped the requirement that Cody spend every Veterans Day in solitary confinement, finding that Judge Gall did not have the authority to impose that type of punishment.

Cody, Ohio Department of Rehabilitation and Correction offender #A651040, is currently incarcerated at Richland Correctional Institution in Mansfield, Ohio. His earliest possible release date is April 28, 2039 when he would be 91 years old, effectively a life sentence.

== In media ==
Cody's fraud began to unravel after a series of articles first published on March 21, 2010 by The St. Petersburg Times (now called the Tampa Bay Times), written by reporters Jeff Testerman and John Martin. The aftermath of the investigation, disappearance, and trial of Cody attracted national media attention over the next few years.

In 2017, the Washingtonian magazine published a detailed article by Daniel Fromson on Cody called "The Strange, Spectacular Con of Bobby Charles Thompson", showing dozens of images from the investigation, including many photos showing Cody (as Thompson) with high level Republican politicians, including George W. Bush.

The book Master of Deceit was written by Jodi Andes in 2020 based on the Cody's crimes. John Testerman, one of the reporters who originally broke the story on Cody's ongoing fraud in 2010, wrote the book Call Me Commander in 2021 along with Daniel Freed.
