= David A. Reid =

American politician

David Reid

Member of the Virginia House of Delegates
- Incumbent
- Assumed office January 10, 2018
- Preceded by: Tag Greason
- Constituency: 32nd district (2018–2024); 28th district (2024–present)

Personal details
- Born: David Alan Reid; January 14, 1962 (age 64) Lexington, Virginia, U.S.
- Party: Democratic
- Spouse: Barbara Reid
- Education: Northeastern Oklahoma State University (BA); National Intelligence University (MS)

Military service
- Allegiance: United States
- Branch/service: United States Navy Reserve
- Years of service: 1988–2011
- Rank: Commander
- Awards: Navy Commendation Medal; Navy Achievement Medal

David Alan Reid (born January 14, 1962) is an American politician and retired US Navy Reserve commander. Reid was elected to the Virginia House of Delegates in 2017. He is a Democrat representing the 28th District, which includes much of eastern Loudoun County in Northern Virginia.

== Early life and education ==
Reid grew up in Rockbridge County, Virginia, before moving to the United Methodist Children's Home in Richmond, Virginia in 1972. After six years, Reid and his youngest brother were adopted and moved to Tahlequah, Oklahoma, with a foster family.

Reid earned a BA in political science from Northeastern Oklahoma State University. He also holds a master's diploma in strategic intelligence from the Joint Military Intelligence College located at the Defense Intelligence Agency in Washington, D.C.

== Career ==
Reid served 23 years in the US Navy Reserve, as a naval intelligence officer, where he retired as a commander (O-5) in 2011. While in the navy, Reid made two deployments to South Korea and one deployment to Iceland.

== Political career ==
Reid ran for the Virginia House of Delegates in the 2017 elections for the 32nd district, defeating incumbent Thomas "Tag" Greason by a margin of 17%. Reid was unchallenged in the 2019 election. Reid faced a challenge from Republican Scott Pio in 2021, winning with 57.09% of the vote. Due to redistricting as a result of the 2020 census, Reid then represented the 28th district. He faced a challenge from Republican Paul Lott in the 2023 election, winning with 61.20% of the vote. In 2025, Reid again secured his reelection with 67.27% of the vote.

On November 14, 2023, Reid announced his campaign for Virginia's 10th congressional district to replace retiring Representative Jennifer Wexton. He was defeated in the primary, placing 6th out of 12 candidates.

Reid championed legislation to convert the privately owned Dulles Greenway into a public-private partnership, arguing it would provide immediate reductions in tolls and would foster the implementation of distance-based-tolling.

Reid authored a memoir in April 2024 titled "Virginia Grit: From Poverty to Policymaker, Creating Opportunity for Everyone."

Date	Election	Candidate	Party	Votes	%
Virginia House of Delegates, 32nd district
Nov 7, 2017	General	David Reid	Democrat	17,865	58.47%
Nov 7, 2017	General	Thomas "Tag" Greason	Republican	12,653	41.41%
Nov 5, 2019	General	David Reid	Democrat	20,462	92.6%
Nov 2, 2021	General	David Reid	Democrat	23,284	57.09%
Nov 2, 2021	General	H. Scott Pio	Republican	16,208	39.74%
Virginia House of Delegates, 28th district
Nov 7, 2023	General	David Reid	Democrat	17,583	61.20%
Nov 7, 2023	General	Paul Lott	Republican	11,048	38.45%
Nov 4, 2025	General	David Reid	Democrat	24,182	67.27
Nov 4, 2025	General	Janet Geisler	Republican	11,700	32.54%
United States House of Representatives, Virginia's 10th district
Jun 18, 2024	Primary	Suhas Subramanyam	Democratic	13,504	30.4%
Jun 18, 2024	Primary	Dan Helmer	Democratic	11,784	26.6%
Jun 18, 2024	Primary	Atif Qarni	Democratic	4,768	10.7%
Jun 18, 2024	Primary	Eileen Filler-Corn	Democratic	4,131	9.3%
Jun 18, 2024	Primary	Jennifer Boysko	Democratic	4,016	9.0%
Jun 18, 2024	Primary	David Reid	Democratic	1,419	3.2%
Jun 18, 2024	Primary	Michelle Maldonado	Democratic	1,412	3.2%
Jun 18, 2024	Primary	Adrian Pokharel	Democratic	1,028	2.3%
Jun 18, 2024	Primary	Krystle Kaul	Democratic	982	2.2%
Jun 18, 2024	Primary	Travis Nembhard	Democratic	722	1.6%
Jun 18, 2024	Primary	Marion Devoe	Democratic	386	0.9%
Jun 18, 2024	Primary	Mark Leighton	Democratic	224	0.5%
