= Thomas P. Mann =

American judge (born 1965)

Thomas Mann
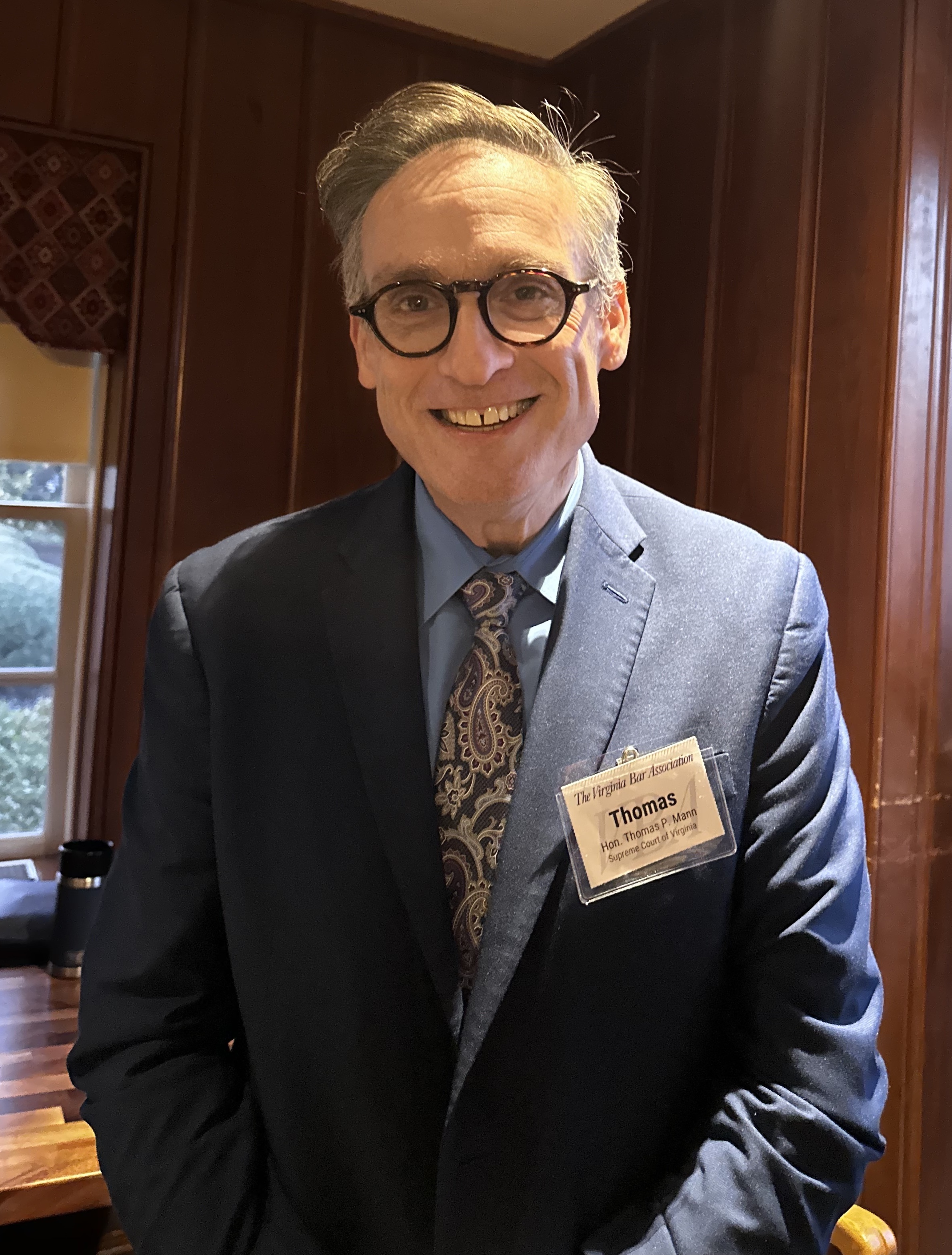

Justice of the Supreme Court of Virginia
- Incumbent
- Assumed office August 1, 2022
- Preceded by: William C. Mims

Personal details
- Born: Thomas Peter Mann; 1965 (age 60–61) New York City, New York, U.S.
- Education: New York University (BA); American University (JD)

Thomas Peter Mann (born 1965) is a justice of the Supreme Court of Virginia and former circuit court judge of Virginia's 19th Judicial Circuit in Fairfax County. He was elected by the Virginia General Assembly to be a justice of the Supreme Court of Virginia for a 12-year term commencing on August 1, 2022.

== Early life and education ==
Mann was born in 1965 in the New York City borough of Manhattan. He received his Bachelor of Arts in Political Science from New York University in 1987 and his Juris Doctor from the Washington College of Law of American University in 1990.

== Career ==
Mann, rated AV by Martindale-Hubbell, was a partner in the law firm of Greenspun & Mann, PC in Fairfax, Virginia.

Mann served as a juvenile and domestic relations court judge from 2006 to 2016. He was Chief Judge of the Fairfax Juvenile and Domestic Relations District Court from 2010 to 2012. He was elevated to the circuit court in July 2016.

In June 2022, Mann was elected by the Virginia General Assembly to serve as a justice of the Virginia Supreme Court for a 12-year term commencing August 1, 2022. He succeeded William C. Mims.

Mann speaks frequently about domestic violence, attorney ethics, evidence, courtroom etiquette and effective advocacy.

Mann has served the community in a number of capacities including membership on the Fairfax County Domestic Violence Fatality Review Team, the Virginia Sentencing Commission and the Circuit Court Drug Court docket.

Legal offices
Preceded by William C. Mims	Justice of the Supreme Court of Virginia; 2022–present	Incumbent
