= David Poisson (politician) =

American politician in Virginia (born 1951)

David E. Poisson

Member of the Virginia House of Delegates from the 32nd district
- In office January 11, 2006 – January 13, 2010
- Preceded by: Dick Black
- Succeeded by: Thomas Greason

Personal details
- Born: September 3, 1951 (age 75) Fall River, Massachusetts, U.S.
- Party: Democratic
- Spouse: Laura Poisson
- Children: Kate Poisson
- Education: University of Massachusetts Amherst; University of Arizona
- Profession: Lawyer

David E. Poisson (born September 3, 1951) is an American politician. He served in the Virginia House of Delegates 2006–10, representing the 32nd district in Loudoun County. He is a member of the Democratic Party. Poisson served on the House committees on Agriculture, Chesapeake and Natural Resources (2006–07), Counties, Cities and Towns (2008–2009), and Militia, Police and Public Safety (2006–2009).

== Electoral history ==
Date	Election	Candidate	Party	Votes	%
Virginia House of Delegates, 32nd district
November 8, 2005	General	David E. Poisson	Democratic	12,469	52.99
November 8, 2005	General	R H Black	Republican	11,034	46.89
November 8, 2005	General	Write Ins		28	0.12
November 8, 2005	General	Incumbent lost; seat switched from Republican to Democratic			
November 6, 2007	General	David E. Poisson	Democratic	10,504	52.84
November 6, 2007	General	Lynn C. Chapman	Republican	9,358	47.08
November 6, 2007	General	Write Ins		14	0.07
November 3, 2009	General	Thomas A. "Tag" Greason	Republican	14,552	57.47
November 3, 2009	General	David E. Poisson	Democratic	10,739	42.41
November 3, 2009	General	Write Ins		30	0.11
November 3, 2009	General	Incumbent lost; seat switched from Democratic to Republican			
