= Bob McDonnell =

American attorney and politician (born 1954)

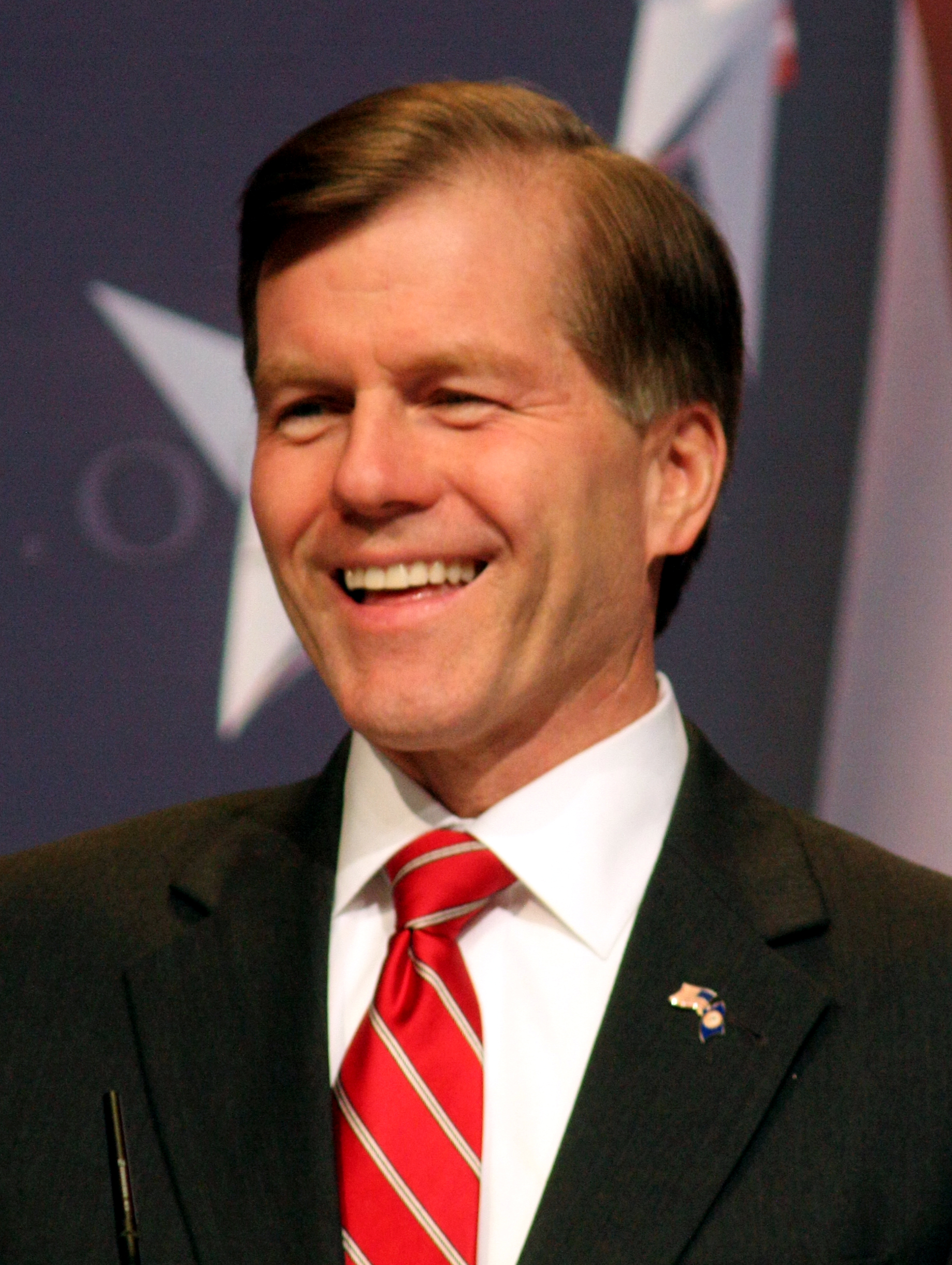
- McDonnell in 2010

71st Governor of Virginia
- In office January 16, 2010 – January 11, 2014
- Lieutenant: Bill Bolling
- Preceded by: Tim Kaine
- Succeeded by: Terry McAuliffe

44th Attorney General of Virginia
- In office January 14, 2006 – February 20, 2009
- Governor: Tim Kaine
- Preceded by: Judith Jagdmann
- Succeeded by: Bill Mims

Member of the Virginia House of Delegates from the 84th district
- In office January 8, 1992 – January 14, 2006
- Preceded by: Glenn McClanan
- Succeeded by: Sal Iaquinto

Personal details
- Born: Robert Francis McDonnell; June 15, 1954 (age 72) Philadelphia, Pennsylvania, U.S.
- Party: Republican
- Spouse(s): Maureen Gardner (m. 1976, divorced); Cheryl McLesky (m. 2026)
- Children: 5
- Education: University of Notre Dame (BBA); Boston University (MS); Regent University (MA, JD)

Military service
- Branch/service: United States Army
- Years of service: 1976–1981 (active); 1981–1997 (reserve)
- Rank: Lieutenant Colonel
- Unit: Army Judge Advocate General's Corps

Robert Francis McDonnell (born June 15, 1954) is an American politician, professor, and former military officer who served as the 71st governor of Virginia from 2010 to 2014. A member of the Republican Party, he previously served as the 44th attorney general of Virginia and as a member of the Virginia House of Delegates.

Born in Philadelphia, McDonnell was a lieutenant colonel in the United States Army Reserve. He was a member of the Virginia House of Delegates from 1992 to 2006 and served as attorney general of Virginia from 2006 to 2009. A member of the Republican Party, McDonnell was elected governor of Virginia after using the campaign slogan "Bob's for Jobs." He defeated Democratic state Senator Creigh Deeds by a 17-point margin in the 2009 general election, which was marked by the severe recession of the late 2000s.

After taking office as governor, McDonnell advocated privatization and promoted offshore drilling for Virginia. He moved to extend a contract to outsource the state's computer operations and sought to fund transportation improvements from asset sales, including a proposal to auction off liquor stores operated by the Virginia Department of Alcoholic Beverage Control. He was barred by the Virginia Constitution from seeking a second consecutive term.

On January 21, 2014, McDonnell and his wife, Maureen, were indicted on federal corruption charges for receiving improper gifts and loans from a Virginia businessman. They were convicted on most counts by a federal jury on September 4, 2014. On June 27, 2016, the Supreme Court of the United States unanimously overturned McDonnell's conviction. Less than three months later, the Justice Department announced that it would not prosecute the case again and moved to dismiss the charges against the McDonnells. As of 2017, McDonnell served as a professor at Regent University and ran the McDonnell Group, a real estate consulting firm, with his sister.

== Early life and education ==
McDonnell was born in Philadelphia, Pennsylvania, the son of Emma B. Meta (née Meiller) and John Francis McDonnell. He spent four years of his early childhood in Germany when his father, a United States Air Force officer, was sent out on assignment. After moving to Virginia, the McDonnells resided in Fairfax County. McDonnell's mother worked at Mount Vernon. McDonnell graduated from Bishop Ireton High School in Alexandria, Virginia, in 1972.

McDonnell attended the University of Notre Dame in South Bend, Indiana, on an ROTC scholarship, graduating with a BBA in management in 1976. Immediately following graduation, he served as a medical supply officer in the United States Army for four years. He served in medical clinics in Germany from 1976 to 1979 and in Newport News, Virginia from 1979 to 1981. In addition, he took night classes and received an MS in business administration from Boston University in 1980.

McDonnell obtained an M.A./J.D. from Christian Broadcasting Network University (later known as Regent University) in 1989. During his studies, McDonnell interned under Congressman Jerry Lewis (R-California).

== House of Delegates (1992–2006) ==
McDonnell greeting President George H. W. Bush in 1992

McDonnell was first elected to the Virginia House of Delegates in 1991, defeating Democratic incumbent Glenn McClanan 53%–47%. He won re-election in 1993 against Thomas Carnes 64%–36%, and was unopposed in 1995, 1997, 2001, and 2003, serving seven terms. The 1999 election against the extremely popular challenger, Sheriff Frank Drew was then the most expensive State Delegate campaign in the history of Virginia. The combined cost of over $985,000 crushed previous records. He represented the 84th district in Virginia Beach. Under the 1998–2001 power-sharing arrangement between House Republicans and Democrats, he was Co-Chair of the Committee on the Chesapeake and its Tributaries in 2000–01. He became Chair of the Courts of Justice Committee in 2003. He also served on the Rules Committee 2000–05, and was Assistant Majority Leader.

== Attorney General (2006–2009) ==
In 2005, McDonnell ran for attorney general. He campaigned on issues including protecting children from sexual predators, drug enforcement, identity theft, gang violence, and terrorism. The first result showed him with a victory of 323 votes, out of over 1.9 million votes cast, over his opponent, Democratic State Senator Creigh Deeds. Deeds filed for a recount, which began on December 20, 2005. A court decision limited the recount to just recompiling vote totals instead of examining individual optically scanned ballots. After preliminary figures revealed 37 more votes for McDonnell and that Deeds could not make up the difference, he conceded the next day, giving McDonnell a 323-vote margin of victory. McDonnell outspent Deeds in the general election by nearly $1 million.

McDonnell was inaugurated on January 14, 2006 in Williamsburg, along with Democratic Governor Tim Kaine and Republican Lieutenant Governor Bill Bolling.

=== Tenure ===
In 2007, McDonnell "played a key role in early negotiations" on the transportation package that was the key issue of contention in the General Assembly. However, subsequently the package was declared unconstitutional based on a challenge filed by a Republican state senator.

Prior to a performance of the Sex Workers' Art Show at the College of William and Mary in 2008, McDonnell forbade the sale of the group's books on school grounds. McDonnell took the side of defecting Northern Virginia Episcopalians in a property lawsuit over the right of the Episcopal Diocese of Virginia to retain church property.

In February 2009, McDonnell resigned as attorney general to campaign full-time for the governorship of Virginia in the 2009 election.

== 2009 campaign for governor ==
McDonnell announced his candidacy for the 2009 Virginia gubernatorial election at American Legion's Boy's State of Virginia 2007, making him the seventh consecutive elected attorney general to run. The statewide candidates, including McDonnell as governor, were selected at a Republican State convention rather than a primary.

In early June, Democratic nominee Creigh Deeds held a slight edge over McDonnell, with a 47%–41% advantage in a Rasmussen poll. As the campaign continued, the polls shifted toward McDonnell's favor, with several giving him a commanding lead.

However, when The Washington Post released McDonnell's thesis from Regent University, McDonnell's lead dwindled to only two percentage points in Rasmussen polling. As the election drew near, McDonnell's campaign regained steam, however. McDonnell defeated Deeds in the general election by a vote of 59%–41%, receiving the highest percentage of the vote for any candidate for governor since 1961. At the same time, the other two statewide offices on the ballot were also won by Republicans.

=== Issues ===
In a political and economic climate marked by the late-2000s recession, McDonnell promised that his priority as governor was employment for Virginians, with such campaign slogans as, "Bob's for Jobs". He supported right-to-work laws, low operating cost of government and a simplified tax code. Having lived in various parts of the state, his road-side billboard varied with geographic location, describing him as "Tidewater's Own", "Northern Virginia's Own", and "Fairfax's Own".

The McDonnell campaign strategy was cast as focusing on economic issues, transportation, and public safety. McDonnell's proposals included new job initiatives, boosting Virginia's tourism, hospitality, and film industries, making Wallops Island the top commercial spaceport in America, and expanding growth in rural Virginia.

McDonnell proposed measures to move $480 million per year from school administration, and put it directly into classrooms; establish more specialized high schools to support high-demand industries; increase online learning through virtual schools; and support educational mentoring programs. McDonnell frequently expressed his support for President Barack Obama's ideas on increasing parental choice through charter schools.

=== Abortion ===
Identifying as anti-abortion, McDonnell campaigned as an opponent of elective abortion. He did not favor standard exceptions on abortion in cases of rape and incest. As a state legislator, he had been the lead sponsor for legislation to ban partial birth abortions, as well as for legislation requiring parental consent for minors' abortions, and informed consent for women seeking abortions.

=== Energy ===
McDonnell advocated making Virginia the energy capital of the East Coast. He supported drilling for oil off of the coast of Virginia while simultaneously developing new technologies for wind, solar, biomass, and other renewable energy resources. He also intended to expand investments in renewable energy sources and incentivize green job creation.

=== Gun rights ===
McDonnell campaigned as a gun rights advocate. He was endorsed by the NRA Political Victory Fund.

=== Gay rights ===
McDonnell opposed same-sex marriage. He advocated a state constitutional amendment defining marriage as between one man and one woman.

=== Marijuana ===
McDonnell opposed legalizing marijuana. He later signed a bill that criminalized the use of synthetic cannabis. It was approved unanimously in both the house and the senate by both political parties.

=== Transportation ===
McDonnell's campaign also turned to transportation, a major issue in heavily congested areas of Virginia, advocating issuing $3 billion in transportation bonds that had been approved by the Virginia General Assembly in 2007, but not funded with a revenue source, modernizing the Virginia Department of Transportation, and encouraging public-private partnerships to improve infrastructure.

=== Transparency ===
McDonnell criticized Governor Tim Kaine for not disclosing his full schedule, and for making out-of-state political appearances as Chair of the Democratic National Committee. McDonnell stated, "The citizens must be certain that the governor is attending to the duties for which he was elected. The governor is Virginia's chief executive, and represents the commonwealth at all times." However, in March 2010, McDonnell received similar criticism for disclosing very few meetings or political appearances on his publicly released schedule.

=== Thesis ===
McDonnell's 1989 thesis for Regent University was a 93-page document titled The Republican Party's Vision for the Family: The Compelling Issue of The Decade. The document explored the rise in the numbers of divorces and illegitimate births, and examined public policies that may have contributed to that increase and proposed solutions. It gained attention in the campaign because it outlined a 15-point conservative agenda, including 10 points McDonnell pursued during his years in the General Assembly, according to press analysis.

The agenda included opposition to abortion, support for school vouchers and covenant marriage, and tax policies that favored heterosexual families. In his thesis, McDonnell wrote "government policy should favor married couples over 'cohabitators, homosexuals or fornicators.'" McDonnell "described working women and feminists as 'detrimental' to the family."

McDonnell also "criticized a landmark 1965 Supreme Court decision" which legalized the use of contraceptives, writing that "man's basic nature is inclined towards evil, and when the exercise of liberty takes the shape of pornography, drug abuse, or homosexuality, the government must restrain, punish, and deter."

McDonnell responded to the article, stating "Virginians will judge me on my 18-year record as a legislator and attorney general and the specific plans I have laid out for our future – not on a decades-old academic paper I wrote as a student during the Reagan era and haven't thought about in years."

The Washington Post reported that McDonnell maintained: "Like everybody, my views on many issues have changed as I have gotten older." McDonnell said that his evolved position on family policy was best represented by his 1995 welfare reform legislation where he "worked to include child day care in the bill so women would have greater freedom to work."

=== Campaign organization and financial support ===
McDonnell's campaign headquarters was located in Richmond. His campaign finance report for September 15, 2009, indicated that he had nearly 1,500 more new donors than the Deeds campaign had total donors, a total of 6,239 donors, and 4,946 of them were new. During the campaign, McDonnell's largest individual donor was former coal magnate Richard Baxter Gilliam, who was also McDonnell's fifth largest overall donor after the United States Chamber of Commerce. McDonnell received over $1.5 million from the energy and natural resources sector, including $622,198 from coal mining interests.

The McDonnell For Governor campaign printed a variety of bumper stickers appealing to many interest groups, including "Women for McDonnell," "Sportsmen for McDonnell," and "Independents for McDonnell." Some appealed to the diverse minority groups throughout the Commonwealth. Some featured the mascots of select public universities such as the University of Virginia, Virginia Tech, James Madison University, Virginia Military Institute, and Old Dominion University. "Irish for McDonnell" stickers were printed for the select Virginia residents who attended the University of Notre Dame as well. His road-side billboard varied with geographic location, describing him as "Tidewater's Own," "Northern Virginia's Own" and "Fairfax's Own." It was suspected that McDonnell failed to comply with gift disclosure requirements over a $15,000 gift that a major campaign donor, Jonnie Williams Sr., made to cover the cost of catering for his daughter's wedding. McDonnell himself paid $8,000 towards the catering and a $3,500 refund for overpayment was returned to McDonnell, rather than to his daughter, potentially giving McDonnell a financial stake in the donor's gift.

== Governor of Virginia (2010–2014) ==
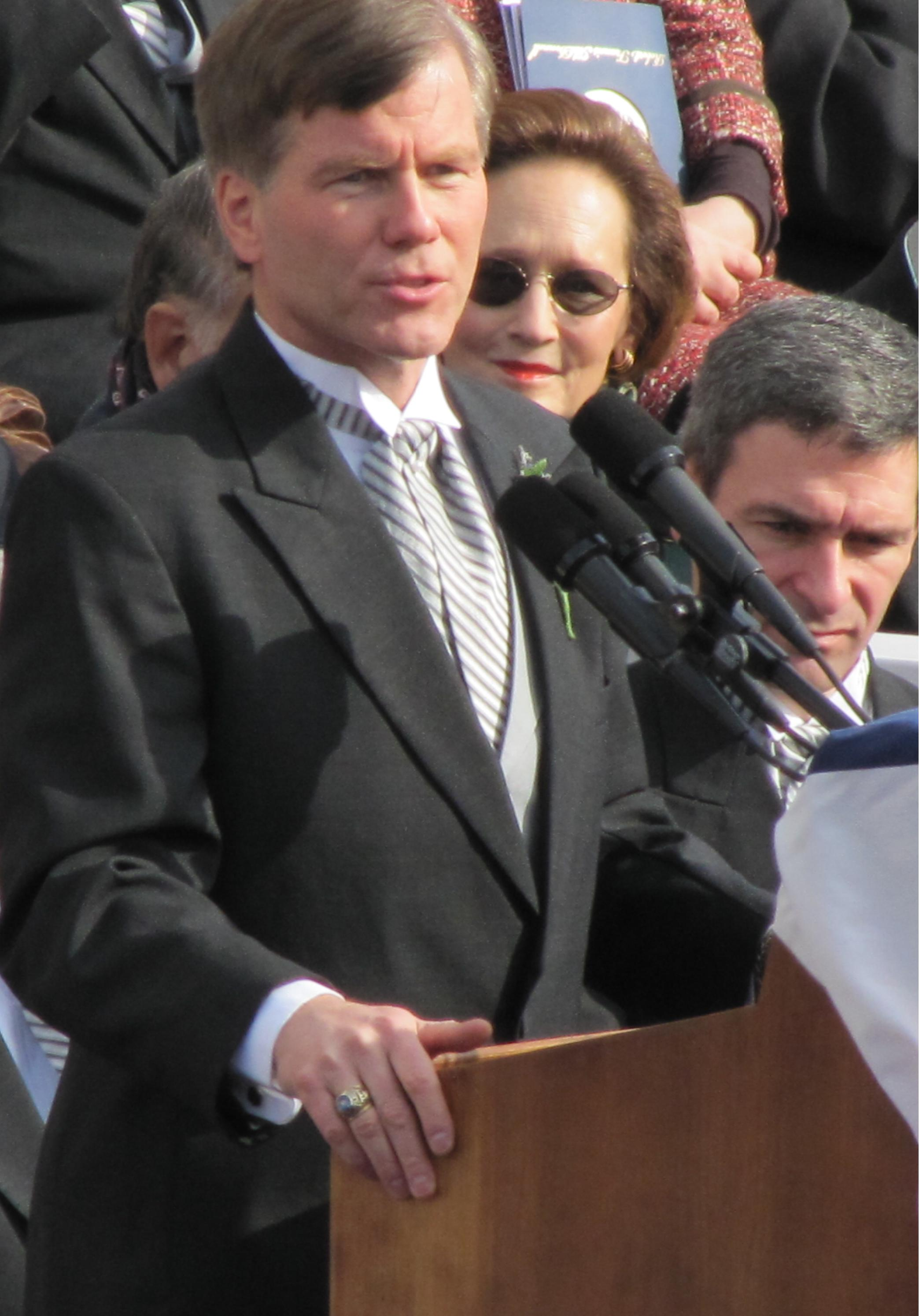
McDonnell at his inauguration as Governor

On January 16, 2010, McDonnell was inaugurated as the 71st governor of the Commonwealth of Virginia, succeeding Democratic Gov. Tim Kaine. This was the first inaugural ceremony to occur on the newly renovated steps of the Virginia State Capitol. In keeping with tradition, McDonnell signed executive orders after taking the oath. Instead of keeping with a 30-year practice by signing an executive order banning discrimination in state employment (which he later signed on February 5), McDonnell signed orders establishing a Commission on job creation and a Virginia Commission on Government Reform and Restructuring.

Two of McDonnell's appointments drew criticism. On May 7, 2010, McDonnell appointed Fred Malek to chair the 31-member advisory commission on reforming state government created by one of his initial executive orders. On May 10, 2010, several Democratic members of the Legislature criticized the appointment due to Malek's controversial actions while personnel director in the Nixon administration and due to a 2007 SEC investigation settlement. On May 25, 2010, McDonnell was asked about the Malek appointment, and stated that he was unaware of Malek's role in the Nixon administration, a remark which State Senator A. Donald McEachin (D-Richmond) told The Washington Post that McDonnell's claim was "absolutely stunning and, frankly, beyond belief." McDonnell also nominated Robert C. Sledd to Secretary of Commerce and Trade, but withdrew the nomination in the face of bipartisan opposition prompted by Sledd's refusal to give up paid outside corporate directorships.

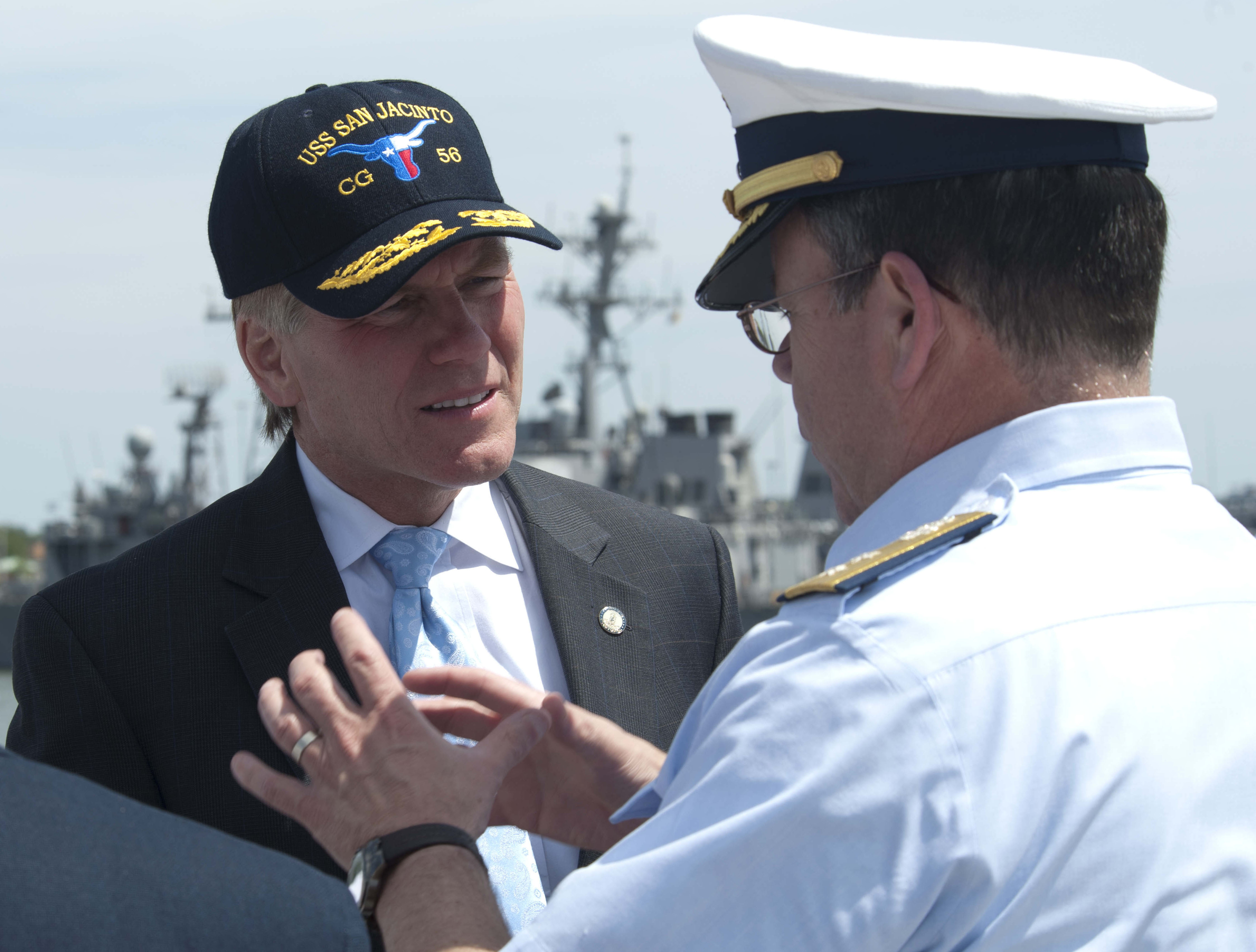
Gov. McDonnell speaks with a U.S. Coast Guard after a military appreciation proclamation ceremony

On January 27, 2010, McDonnell delivered the Republican response to President Barack Obama's State of the Union Address. The response was delivered to GOP lawmakers, and invited friends in the chamber of the Virginia House of Delegates. Critics argued that the use of House chamber for McDonnell's speech did not comply with House Rule 82.

After his election as governor, McDonnell shifted his fundraising activities to his "Opportunity Virginia PAC" which raised $1,194,934 through June 2010. Many of the donations came from industries regulated by the state.

In April 2010, McDonnell renegotiated and extended a contract for outsourcing the state's computer operations to Northrop Grumman. At that time, McDonnell proposed legislation, which was passed, to have the Virginia Information Technologies Agency report directly to the governor instead of to an independent board. Subsequently, McDonnell was criticized when the Northrup computer systems experienced a week-long computer outage from August 25 through September 2, 2010. As a result, 45,000 people were unable to renew their driver's licenses. Computer systems for nearly a third of the state's agencies were affected. Over 4,000 people had to return to the Department of Motor Vehicles to get their photos retaken after an August 25 computer outage left their original photos unrecoverable. The system had also experienced a prior unrelated outage on August 9. Subsequently, Northrop Grumman agreed to pay $250,000 to fund a state investigation of the computer outage.

The 2010 session of the General Assembly passed a bill exempting certain veterans' organizations from the registration and reporting requirements that apply to most charities that solicit donations in Virginia. The bill was introduced at the request of Bobby Thompson, director of the U.S. Navy Veterans Association (USNVA), who made large contributions to certain Republican candidates. After the bill passed both the House and Senate, newspaper accounts of that charity's questionable practices caused a sponsor of the bill to request McDonnell to veto it, but he signed the bill into law anyway. As a result, the organization, which was under investigation in New Mexico (which barred the USNVA before the Virginia bill was signed), Florida, and Missouri, as well as other non-profit veterans' organizations, did not have to report to Virginia on how they spend the donations that they receive. McDonnell later donated to charity the $5,000 campaign contribution that he had received from Thompson. In August 2010, Ohio Attorney General Richard Cordray announced that a nationwide arrest warrant had been issued for Thompson, who had stolen the identity and Social Security number of a victim who was not connected to the USNVA. Corday stated, "We know he bilked Ohioans out of at least $1.9 million, and we estimate that nationally he collected at least $20 million." Thompson was later arrested and identified as John Donald Cody, a fugitive who had been wanted by the FBI for several years.

On January 14, 2011, McDonnell issued a directive ordering the Department of Conservation and Recreation to cease enforcing regulations prohibiting the carrying of firearms in state parks. He also gave preliminary approval to amend the regulations to allow people to carry open or concealed firearms in state forests. The regulations were already amended in 2003 to allow concealed weapons on park property.

On August 15, 2011, McDonnell was named chairman of the Republican Governors Association.

At the end of McDonnell's tenure, he had a 55% approval rating among registered voters. He was barred by the Virginia Constitution from seeking a second consecutive term.

=== Social issues ===
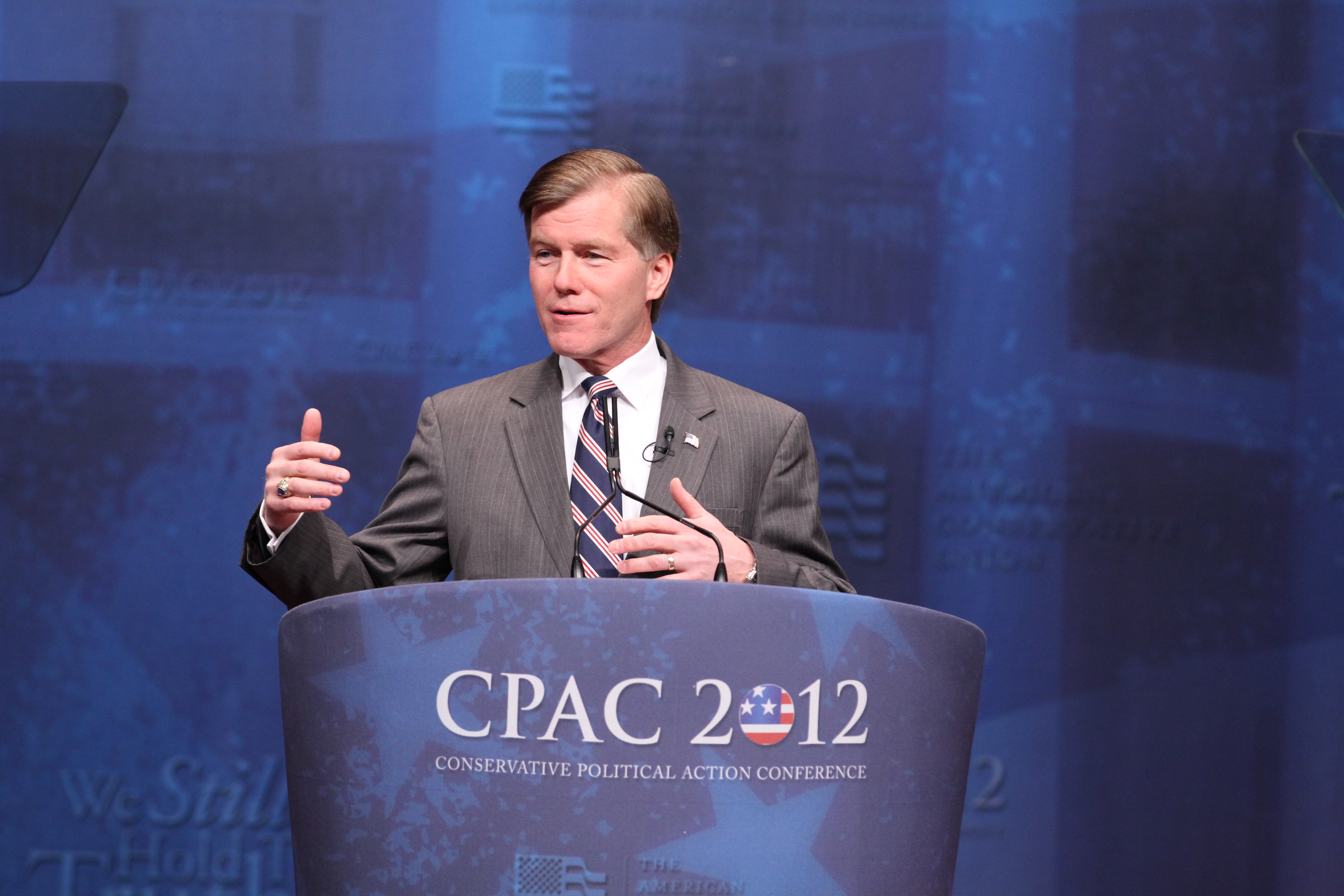
McDonnell speaking at the 2012 Conservative Political Action Committee

==== Confederate History Month proclamation ====
At the request of the Sons of Confederate Veterans, McDonnell issued a proclamation designating April 2010 as "Confederate History Month" following similar designations by two of his Republican predecessors, George Allen (in 1995, 1996, and 1997) and James S. Gilmore, but unlike the two Democratic governors immediately preceding McDonnell, who did not designate such a month.

McDonnell's initial proclamation omitted direct mention of slavery, drawing criticism from the Virginia Legislative Black Caucus and the NAACP. When initially asked why he had made the omission, McDonnell stated that "there were any number of aspects to that conflict between the states. Obviously, it involved slavery. It involved other issues. But I focused on the ones I thought were most significant for Virginia."

On April 7, 2010, McDonnell conceded that omitting slavery from his proclamation was "a major omission," apologized, and amended the document. McDonnell had previously refused to rule out the possibility that he would run for vice president in 2012; while news analysts Chris Cillizza, Mark Plotkin, and Teddy Davis speculated that the mistake may have a significant adverse impact on McDonnell's chances for a future vice presidential nomination, a May 22 Time magazine article described McDonnell as "a politician who inexplicably kneecapped himself is clawing his way back."

On September 24, 2010, McDonnell addressed an academic conference on slavery and announced that he will declare April 2011 as "Civil War in Virginia" month rather than "Confederate History Month." He also called the April 2010 proclamation an "error of haste and not of heart."

==== State health benefits for same-sex partners ====
In December 2009, Governor Kaine had started a process to extend state employee health benefits to same-sex partners. At McDonnell's request, Attorney General Ken Cuccinelli issued a legal opinion that this change to the coverage of the state employees' health plan could not be made without explicit legislation authorizing it, thereby halting the administrative process to make the change. However, McDonnell signed a law allowing Virginia employers to offer private life insurance coverage for employees' same-sex partners, after the bill passed with bipartisan support.

==== Death sentence for Teresa Lewis ====
In a decision that drew controversy, McDonnell declined to commute the death sentence to life imprisonment in the case of Teresa Lewis, who was executed on September 23, 2010. She was the first woman executed in Virginia since 1912. Calls had been made for leniency, citing her below average mental capacity.

=== Abortion ===
In 2012, national attention was focused on a bill before the Virginia state legislature, controlled by Republicans, to require a trans-vaginal ultrasound for any woman contemplating an abortion in Virginia. McDonnell initially supported the bill, but backed off after public protests. He persuaded the legislators to pass instead a slightly watered-down version requiring a less invasive abdominal ultrasound before an abortion and exempting women who were pregnant as a result of rape or incest, provided they reported it to the police. The redrafted bill was opposed by pro-choice groups and a minority in the legislature, but McDonnell signed it into law on March 7, 2012.

=== Voting rights restoration for felons ===
In April 2010, McDonnell drew criticism from black leaders and civil rights groups when a draft policy proposal was mistakenly sent to 200 felons, informing them of his decision to require a written essay from each applicant seeking to have voting and other civil rights restored. Previously, applicants were required to fill out a one-page application. Only Virginia and Kentucky require the governor to act on individual requests for restoring voting rights.

On May 21, McDonnell announced new policies on the issue of restoration of rights, imposing a 60-day deadline for his administration to act on an application once all of the required documentation was received from the applicant and the courts; reducing the time nonviolent felons must wait to apply for restoration of rights from three to two years, and cutting the waiting period for reapplication if a request is denied from two years to one. Democratic Delegate David Englin commented, "By establishing a timely and more clearly defined process for non-violent ex-offenders seeking to have their rights restored, the Governor's new policy has the potential make an important step in the right direction." By the end of his term on January 11, 2014, McDonnell had restored the rights of 8,013 ex-felons; more than any previous governor in Virginia history.

=== Transportation ===
On April 30, 2010, McDonnell authorized issuing $493 million in transportation bonds in May 2010 and an additional $1.493 billion over the five years to finance previously approved transportation projects. The bonds were a part of a transportation package enacted three years previously, but had not been issued while Republican State Delegate Robert Marshall filed a lawsuit challenging their constitutionality while certain transportation notes issued during the Gilmore Administration had not yet been paid off. Critics noted that Virginia lacked a revenue source to amortize the bonds. On December 9, 2010, McDonnell announced a revised transportation funding plan which included both $1.8 billion in bonds that had been approved in 2007, as well as an additional $1.1 billion which he proposed to pay back from future federal transportation funds. He also proposed to spend $150 million of the 2009–2010 budget surplus and $250 million in reserves to protect against gasoline tax revenue shortfalls. On January 9, 2011, McDonnell proposed funding projects to address traffic congestion in Northern Virginia and Hampton roads by diverting 0.25% of the sales tax collected in those areas from the General Fund into the transportation fund. Legislation was required to implement the proposal, and Democrats responded that the revenues were needed in the General Fund for schools and public safety and that the projected revenues were insufficient to make a difference on highway needs.

On May 10, 2010, McDonnell filed an application with the Federal Highway Administration seeking permission to collect tolls on Interstate 95 near the North Carolina border. The highway had been constructed with taxpayer funds, 90% from the federal government and 10% from Virginia gasoline taxes. However, Virginia claimed that they did not have sufficient revenues to maintain I-95 at a safe level and proposed the toll to raise a projected $30 to $60 million annually. McDonnell asked the Federal Highway Administration to authorize the toll under its "Interstate System Reconstruction and Rehabilitation Pilot Program".

In 2008, the federal government and the Washington Metropolitan Area Transit Authority had reached an agreement for federal funding of $1.5 billion in capital improvements contingent on Virginia, Maryland, and the District of Columbia pledging to develop dedicated funding for the Metro system. WMATA was created by an interstate compact, a kind of agreement between states similar to a treaty or contract which must also be approved by the U.S. Congress, and founded in 1967 with a board of directors whose members are appointed by each local jurisdiction in its service area, including four from Virginia appointed by the Northern Virginia Transportation Commission (NVTC). In June 2010, McDonnell threatened to withhold Virginia's WMATA funding unless the composition of WMATA's board was modified to allow Virginia's governor to appoint two of the seats. The interstate compact establishing WMATA specified that its Virginia members were selected by the NVTC. In turn, Virginia law specified that local jurisdictions appointed that Commission's members. Rather than proposing to amend either law, McDonnell merely threatened to withhold Virginia's "dedicated" matching funds if the NVTC did not appoint two people that he selected instead of appointing representatives from local jurisdictions. On June 17, 2010, Federal Transit Administrator Peter Rogoff required a formal commitment from Virginia to match its share of the federal funds if the federal funding were to continue. On June 24, 2010, McDonnell withdrew his request to appoint two members of the Metro Board as a precondition for making the scheduled "dedicated" payment under the 2008 agreement. On July 1, 2010, the WMATA Board of Directors approved an agreement with Virginia to provide matching funds without regard to McDonnell's request for board seats. Based on that agreement, the federal funds were reconfirmed, and WMATA signed a $886 million contract for 428 new Metrorail cars.

=== Health care ===
In April 2010, McDonnell signed a bill seeking to nullify the insurance purchase requirement in the then proposed federal health care legislation. On March 10, 2010, before Congress finished its final consideration of the package, a bipartisan Virginia Healthcare Freedom Act passed the General Assembly by an 80–17 majority, which McDonnell signed on March 24, 2010. McDonnell supported Virginia's legal challenge to the constitutionality of the final Patient Protection and Affordable Care Act. Although abortion funding was not debated during the regular session of the General Assembly, McDonnell raised the issue through the use of his amendatory veto power. During the April 21, 2010 veto session, the Virginia legislature passed restrictions on state public funding for elective abortion except in the instances of rape, incest, life of the mother, or life-threatening fetal anomaly.

In April 2012 McDonnell vetoed HB 399, which sought to improve neonatal care by fast-tracking implementation of newborn screening for life-threatening congenital heart malformations.

=== Education ===
In Virginia, public schools are funded from both local real estate taxes as well as state general funds under a formula that attempts to assure minimum statewide standards called "The Standards of Quality". Virginia also earmarks revenues from its state lottery for education. Outgoing Governor Tim Kaine proposed $11.4 billion for K-12 education in the 2010–2012 budget. On February 17, 2010, McDonnell proposed $268.8 million in cuts. McDonnell's cuts included changing the formula for measuring the ability of localities to pay for education, reducing funding for technology expenditures, and reducing funding under the Standards of Quality.

The House adopted $620 million in education cuts, and the Senate adopted a budget with $133 million in education cuts. The final, signed budget cut over $646 million for public schools.

Because K-12 education comprised 37% of the general fund budget, critics noted that McDonnell's proposal to fund transportation bonds from the general fund would have resulted in further education cuts in future years. McDonnell disagreed, saying he could lean heavily on growth in revenues rather than pulling from existing money.

Although McDonnell supported the Race to the Top federal education funding program during his campaign for governor, on May 26, 2010, he withdrew Virginia from the second round of "Race to the Top". Virginia had finished 31st out of 41 states in the first round; McDonnell decided that Virginia should not file its application for the second round because he erroneously believed the competition required the use of multi-state education performance standards instead of Virginia's standards. However, the use of common performance standards were not required and counted for 40 points out of a possible 500 total points in evaluating state proposals. McDonnell later stated on MSNBC that the Race to the Top rules precluded participating states from adopting more rigorous standards in addition to whatever multi-state standards they join. However, the "Race to the Top" regulations award the points even if states adopt standards more rigorous than the optional, common standards.

=== Offshore drilling ===
Previously, the General Assembly passed a bill in 2006 to allow offshore exploratory gas drilling outside a 50-mile limit. On March 11, 2010, McDonnell signed into law bipartisan legislation to allow the drilling for oil and gas in federal waters 50 miles or more off the Virginia coast if also permitted by the Federal government. (see Offshore drilling on the US Atlantic coast). The plan was criticized by some environmentalists and Democrats who argued that tourism and wildlife would be threatened and that oil drilling would not make a difference in achieving long-term energy independence. Congressman James P. Moran (D-Va), chair of the House Appropriations Subcommittee with jurisdiction over the Interior Department, and others, argued further that most of the proposed drilling area was located in an area reserved for naval operations.

McDonnell advocated drilling off the Virginia coast of the Atlantic Ocean as a possible revenue source for the state. However, according to the law, Virginia could not receive any revenues from drilling in federal waters, which included all drilling sites more than 3 miles off the coast. On May 6, 2010, the Department of Interior suspended the proposed auction of offshore Virginia leasing rights. Congressman Moran issued a statement commending the decision. On May 18, Moran forwarded to McDonnell a Department of Defense report finding that the proposed lease site would interfere with naval operations. On May 25, McDonnell reaffirmed his interest in having oil drilling off the Virginia coast notwithstanding the British Peteroleum oil spill and the inability of Virginia to get any of the royalty income. On May 27, President Obama announced that the offshore Virginia lease sale was cancelled. Subsequently, McDonnell proposed continuing a federal environmental study of drilling off the Virginia coast or drilling for just gas and not oil. However, a consulting firm said that liquids are almost always produced with gas offshore and so the proposed idea may not be possible.

=== Budget ===
On December 18, 2009, outgoing Governor Kaine proposed $76.8 billion of expenditures for adoption by the incoming state legislature. Kaine's budget proposed to rationalize state revenues by increasing the income tax while lowering property taxes and other fees. As incoming governor, McDonnell refused to publicly recommend any modifications to Kaine's budget and instead worked with the House of Delegates to bring Kaine's plan up for a quick vote and defeat. Privately, McDonnell advocated cutting $300 million from health programs, $730 million from K-12 education, changing the state retirement system, and requiring 10 days of furloughs for state employees, to offset budgetary shortfalls for 2010–2012. On February 17, 2010, after political pressure, McDonnell publicly released his proposed cuts. The Senate adopted a budget which restored a number of cuts to education, health and human services, and a House–Senate conference managed to work out a compromise on March 14 containing about $250 million in cuts before the expiration of the legislative session.

On April 14, 2010, McDonnell proposed 96 budget amendments to the two-year 2010–2012 budget resulting in $42.1 million in spending increases and $51 million in additional budget cuts, tax increases, and court fees for criminals. To boost revenue, McDonnell proposed raising $7.2 million by increasing the fines on motorists who exceed the speed limit. He proposed to cut an additional $9.9 million from state funded programs for at-risk and troubled children and proposed cutting $600,000 from state grants to public radio and television stations. McDonnell also issued amendatory vetoes on non-budget legislation. For example, although Virginia has provided free electronic filing of tax returns for years, his veto outsourced electronic filing to firms that charge a fee for that service. McDonnell also amended a bill to prohibit Planned Parenthood from spending funds raised from its affinity license plates on abortions. The Legislature met to vote on the Governor's amendments on April 21. A bipartisan majority accepted some of McDonnell's proposed cuts while rejecting others including those to public broadcasting, the funding for at-risk and troubled children, and the shifting of Virginia Medicaid mental health program to a managed-care plan.

==== Results from 2010 fiscal year ====
The first budget enacted under the McDonnell administration took effect on July 1, 2010. Two of McDonnell's legislative initiatives increased the surplus for the 2009–2010 fiscal year. First, the budget bill accelerated the payment of state sales taxes resulting in a one-time shift of revenues to be collected in July 2010 into the previous fiscal year. Second, the budget bill deferred a $620 million payment to the Virginia Retirement System to future years. The end of year surplus triggered the payment of a 3% bonus to state employees in December 2010. Members of both parties called on McDonnell to use the surplus to reverse the Virginia Retirement System deferral.

==== Liquor sales ====
In August 2010, McDonnell embarked on a promotional tour advocating legislation to sell Virginia's liquor stores to private owners. McDonnell held eight town hall meetings around the state to discuss the plan. He argued that retail alcohol sales is not an appropriate state activity and proposed that any sales proceeds could be used to finance transportation needs. Opponents noted that the liquor stores generate $248 million per year for Virginia's general fund.

On September 8, 2010, McDonnell presented his plan for auctioning liquor licenses to his government reform commission. He proposed tripling the number of stores selling liquor to 1,000, with the licenses to operate these new stores being auctioned. According to the Richmond Times-Dispatch, "Of the 1,000 licenses, 600 would be available to big retailers, whose lawyers and lobbyists helped craft the governor's proposal. An additional 150 licenses would be reserved for package stores, with 250 for small retailers, such as convenience-store operators." McDonnell estimated that winning bidders would pay $265 million for the licenses, and that the state could receive $33 million from selling existing state-owned liquor store properties. In addition, $160 million would be collected in wholesale license fees. To make up from the annual loss of general fund revenues from the current state-owned stores, McDonnell proposed a $17.50 per gallon excise tax (which is above the national average and above that charged in neighboring states) and to charge an annual fee of $500 to $2,000 to each store license holder, imposing a new 1% gross receipts tax on wholesalers of liquor, and a 2.5% tax on restaurants and bars that chose to purchase alcohol from wholesalers instead of retail outlets. Just before the presentation, McDonnell dropped his proposed 1.5% fee on all restaurants and retail establishments that was in earlier drafts of his plan. McDonnell proposed to call a special session of the Virginia legislature in November 2010 to consider the proposal.

The plan drew immediate opposition from conservative lawmakers as a "tax increase". It was also opposed by the Virginia Retail Federation, the Virginia Beer Wholesalers Association, and the Virginia Wine Wholesalers Association. The Baptist General Association of Virginia and the Virginia Interfaith Center for Public Policy opposed the plan out of concerns that it would increase alcohol consumption. The plan was endorsed by the Fraternal Order of Police, the Virginia Transportation Construction Industry, and the Virginia Retail Merchants Association and the Fairfax County Chamber of Commerce.

On the eve of McDonnell taking the plan to the restructuring commission for their endorsement, The Washington Post reported that he modified it by dropping the restaurant tax and certain other proposed fees. He also proposed to set aside over 100 licenses for companies that employ less than 50 people in order to help small family owned stores, and wanted to give small businesses several years to pay off their auction bids. The Post suggested that "he might call off plans for a November special session" of the General Assembly. On October 4, the Malek commission voted 22 to 3 to endorse McDonnell's modified plan. The Commission proposed a number of cost savings in government operations to offset the projected $47 million annual revenue loss from selling the ABC liquor stores.

In October 2010, McDonnell's modified plan drew criticism from Republican members of the House of Delegates, including Del. Thomas D. Gear who chaired the House subcommittee that considered the proposal, and Del. Timothy D. Hugo, chairman of the House Republican caucus. Concerns heightened when Phil Cox, who headed McDonnell's political action committee, threatened to withhold campaign funds from Republican delegates who failed to support the modified plan. According to The Washington Post, "Delegates have privately complained that the plan was developed with too little input from legislators and too much from lobbyists for retail and alcohol interests." On October 22, 2010, McDonnell decided not call a special session, but to instead appoint a "working group" to further refine the plan so that implementing legislation could be on the first day of the 2011 legislative session. McDonnell's working group of Republican legislators, wholesalers, distillers, and retailers sought to develop a compromise designed to win adoption by the legislature.

On November 23, 2010, the Joint Legislative Audit and Review Committee released a report which found that the McDonnell proposal had overstated the expected proceeds of liquor store sales and licenses. In response, McDonnell's spokesman said that he was committed to privatization and was considering alternative plans. McDonnell hired a consultant at a cost of $75,000 to formulate a new privatization plan prior to the legislative session in January 2011. The auditors found that McDonnell's proposal would have increased the retail price of distilled spirits 11 to 26 percent, which in turn would have led to a drop in liquor sales that could have resulted in a loss of as much as $15.4 million in sales tax revenues.

In what The Washington Post described as "the biggest legislative defeat of his tenure", both houses of the Virginia General Assembly refused to hold hearings on McDonnell's plan during the 2011 legislative session. Both the Republican-controlled House and the Democratic-controlled Senate killed the bill implementing McDonnell's proposal without a vote. McDonnell's director of policy, Eric Finkbeiner told the Post, "Whether we do it this year, next year or the year after, it's going to get done in this administration."

=== Job creation ===
McDonnell amended the budget to increase the incentives that a governor was able to provide employers to relocate to or remain in Virginia. He campaigned to have Northrop Grumman move its 300-job headquarters to Virginia, but stated that the renewal of Virginia's computer outsourcing contract was not linked to the relocation decision. When Defense Secretary Robert Gates announced the closing of the 6,000-job Joint Forces Command in August 2010, McDonnell sought private meetings to seek to preserve the jobs.

However, McDonnell was disappointed that Secretary Gates did not meet with him to discuss the issue. McDonnell was later included in a meeting between Gates and Virginia's congressional delegation on November 23, 2010.

The state's unemployment rate declined 2.2% from 7.4% in January 2010, when McDonnell took office, to 5.2% in December 2013, compared to the 3.1% decline in the national unemployment rate from 9.8% to 6.7% during the same period.

=== Redistricting ===
McDonnell played a significant role in the redistricting conducted in response to the 2010 census. In a special session of the General Assembly, the redistricting of both the House of Delegates and the State Senate were passed in single bill that was approved by the House with an 86 to 8 vote and the Senate with a 22 to 18 vote. The bill was developed without regard to the advisory commission's recommendations. On April 15, 2011, McDonnell vetoed the bill on the grounds that "the Senate plan is the kind of political gerrymandering that Virginians have ask that we leave in the past." Although McDonnell had the power to amend the bill with his veto, he simply sent it back for the General Assembly to either over-ride the veto or adopt a different bill. Because the Democrats lacked the 2/3 majority necessary to override the veto, the State Senate had to adopt a new plan. At first, Senate Majority Leader Richard L. Saslaw promised to merely readopt the vetoed redistricting map, but then began negotiations with the governor's office about a new plan. Republican members of the House and Senate criticized the Governor for overturning the timetable for approval of new districts prior to the 2011 elections. After lengthy negotiations, on April 28, both houses passed a revised set of district maps and McDonnell announced that he would sign the revised bill.

=== Executive mansion spending ===
In June 2013, McDonnell and his wife were the subject of a critical article in The Washington Post detailing their improper spending at the Executive Mansion, for items such as energy drinks, dog food, and a "detox cleanse". Following the report, a McDonnell spokesman explained that energy drinks were a standard part of their breakfast routine.

In July 2013, according to The Washington Post, McDonnell reimbursed the state about $2,400 for the food and other items that the governor's children had removed from the Executive Mansion to take to their college dorms.

== Federal corruption charges ==
On January 21, 2014, McDonnell and his wife, Maureen McDonnell, were indicted on federal corruption charges. The charges filed by prosecutor Jack Smith, followed a months-long federal investigation into gifts McDonnell received from a political donor. The McDonnells were charged with 14 different counts relating to their acceptance of more than $135,000 in gifts, including a Rolex watch, loans, trips and other items from Jonnie Williams Sr., former CEO of Star Scientific, a company developing a compound called anatabine as a dietary supplement and as a drug. In 2013, McDonnell repaid more than $120,000 to Williams and apologized for bringing "embarrassment" to the state. McDonnell insisted he did not break the law and vowed to fight "these false allegations". He became the first Governor of Virginia to be indicted for actions committed during his tenure. In July and August 2014, Williams testified at McDonnell's federal corruption trial.

The trial lasted five weeks and focused heavily on McDonnell's relationship with his wife, putting details of their relationship and private life on public display. McDonnell said in a 2017 interview that prosecutors threatened his children to be careful of conversations with their parents lest the children be charged with obstruction of justice. After three days' jury deliberations in the United States District Court for the Eastern District of Virginia, McDonnell and his wife were found guilty of public corruption charges on September 4, 2014. He was convicted of honest services wire fraud, obtaining property under color of official right, and extortion under color of official right. His wife was convicted of honest services wire fraud, obtaining property under color of official right, extortion under color of official right, and obstruction of a federal proceeding. Senior United States District Judge James R. Spencer set sentencing for January 6, 2015. The United States Probation Office recommended sentencing between ten years and one month to twelve years and seven months. Following his conviction, McDonnell lost his Liberty University teaching job.

On January 6, 2015, Judge Spencer sentenced the former governor to two years in prison, followed by two years' supervised release. Prior to sentencing, the judge agreed with the defense counsel, believing McDonnell's gifts were overstated, and reduced McDonnell's potential sentence. In arguing for leniency, McDonnell's attorneys from the Jones Day megafirm produced over 400 letters, including ones from McDonnell's predecessor, Tim Kaine, and a group of 44 former attorneys general, arguing that McDonnell led an exemplary public life marred by one mistake. In February 2015, Maureen McDonnell was sentenced to a year and a day in prison.

=== Supreme Court case ===
On January 26, 2015, the 4th U.S. Circuit Court of Appeals ordered that McDonnell remain free pending appeal. On July 10, 2015, the court affirmed McDonnell's conviction. On August 31, 2015, the U.S. Supreme Court ordered that McDonnell remain free pending a decision from that court to hear or not hear the case. On December 8, 2015, the U.S. Solicitor General and others filed a brief with the Supreme Court requesting the court not to hear the case. In January 2016, the Supreme Court agreed to hear the case.

The Supreme Court heard oral arguments on the case on April 27, 2016, and unanimously vacated McDonnell's conviction on June 27, holding that the trial court's construction of the statutory term "official act" was too broad, encompassing activities such as setting up meetings, hosting parties and calling Virginia officials to discuss Williams's business. Chief Justice John Roberts, left open the option for retrying McDonnell under a more restrictive construction of the disputed term, writing, "If the court below determines that there is sufficient evidence for a jury to convict Governor McDonnell of committing or agreeing to commit an 'official act', his case may be set for a new trial. If the court instead determines that the evidence is insufficient, the charges against him must be dismissed. We express no view on that question." There was criticism of the decision, some noting that all of the justices themselves had each received expensive gifts or travel while serving on the Supreme Court at the time that the decision was handed down.

After reviewing the Supreme Court decision and the response of the original prosecution team, which wanted to retry the case, the Justice Department announced on September 8, 2016, it would move to dismiss all charges against McDonnell and his wife. McDonnell said he felt vindicated and told NBC's Chuck Todd in an interview, "I know in my heart, Chuck, I never believed that anything that I did was wrong or illegal."

The case cost McDonnell over $27 million in legal fees.

== Post-gubernatorial career ==
As of 2017, McDonnell served as a professor at Regent University and ran the McDonnell Group, a real estate consulting firm, with his sister.

== Personal life ==
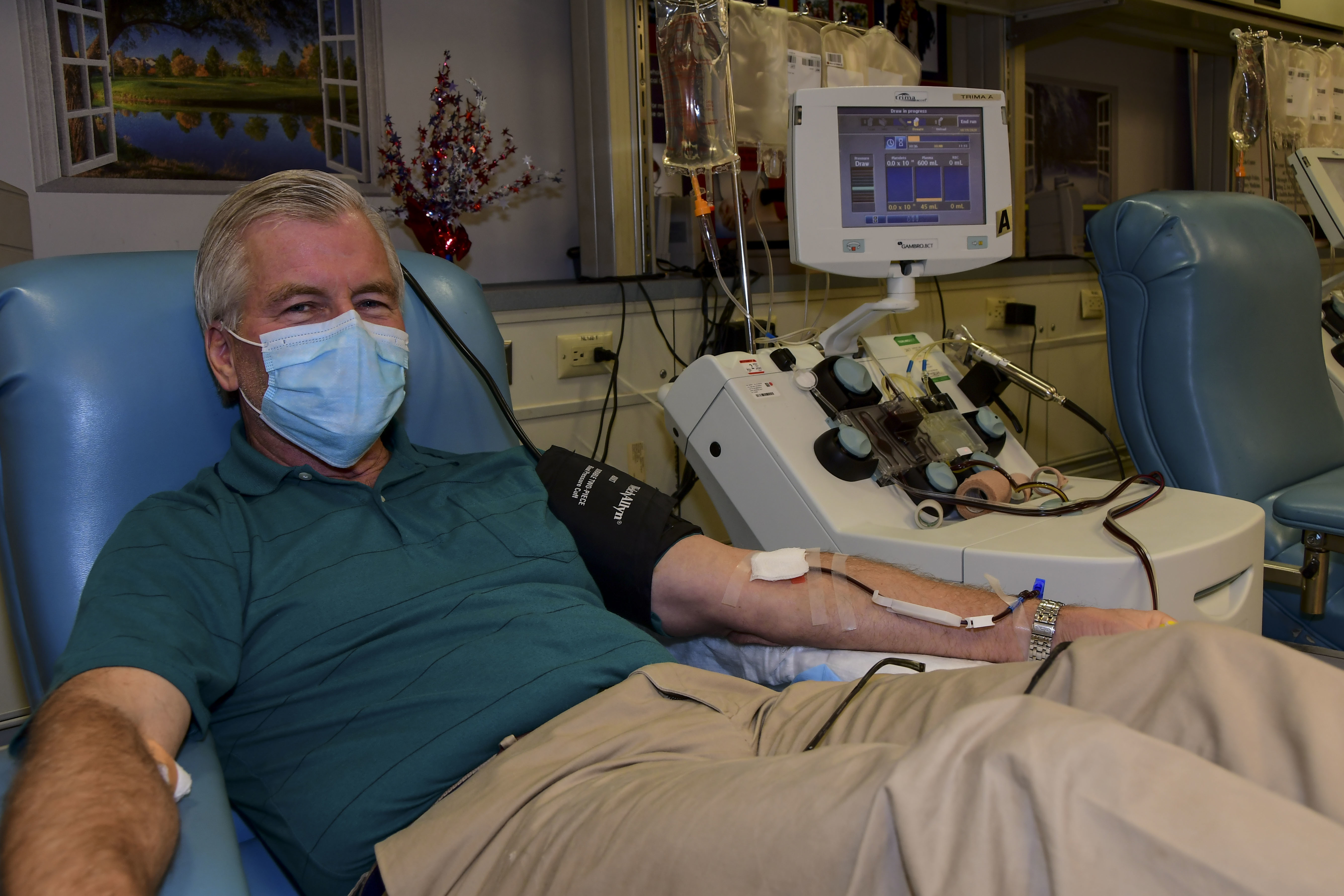
McDonnell donating plasma during the COVID-19 pandemic, October 2020

McDonnell married Maureen Patricia Gardner in 1976. They have five children, the eldest of whom, Jeanine, served as a U.S. Army Signal Corps officer in Iraq.

McDonnell filed for divorce from his wife in early November 2018 following years of marital difficulties.

He married Cheryl McLesky in April 2026.

== See also ==
- McDonnell v. United States
- Electoral history of Bob McDonnell

Legal offices
Preceded by Judith Jagdmann	Attorney General of Virginia; 2006–2009	Succeeded by Bill Mims
Party political offices
Preceded by Jerry Kilgore	Republican nominee for Governor of Virginia; 2009	Succeeded by Ken Cuccinelli
Preceded by Bobby Jindal	Response to the State of the Union address 2010	Succeeded by Paul Ryan
Preceded by Rick Perry	Chair of the Republican Governors Association; 2011–2012	Succeeded by Bobby Jindal
Political offices
Preceded by Tim Kaine	Governor of Virginia; 2010–2014	Succeeded by Terry McAuliffe
U.S. order of precedence (ceremonial)
Preceded by Jim Gilmore as Former Governor	Order of precedence of the United States	Succeeded by Terry McAuliffe as Former Governor
