= William C. Mims =

American judge (born 1957)

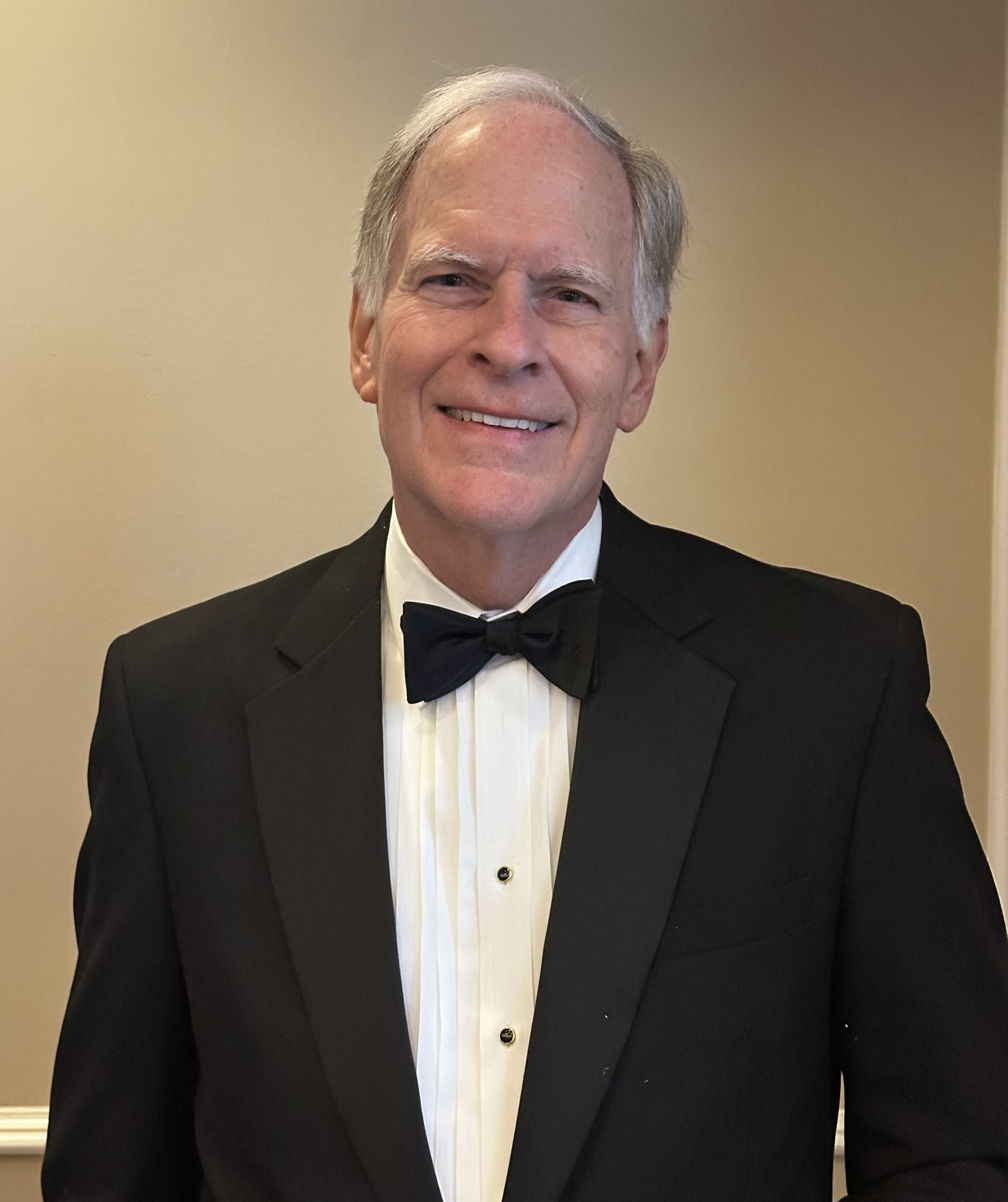

Justice of the Supreme Court of Virginia
- In office April 1, 2010 – March 31, 2022
- Preceded by: Barbara Milano Keenan
- Succeeded by: Thomas P. Mann

45th Attorney General of Virginia
- In office February 26, 2009 – January 16, 2010
- Governor: Tim Kaine
- Preceded by: Bob McDonnell
- Succeeded by: Ken Cuccinelli

Member of the Virginia Senate from the 33rd district
- In office January 23, 1998 – January 14, 2006
- Preceded by: Charles Waddell
- Succeeded by: Mark Herring

Member of the Virginia House of Delegates from the 32nd district
- In office January 8, 1992 – January 22, 1998
- Preceded by: Linda Rollins
- Succeeded by: Dick Black

Personal details
- Born: William Cleveland Mims; June 20, 1957 (age 68) Harrisonburg, Virginia, U.S.
- Party: Republican
- Education: College of William and Mary (BA); George Washington University (JD); Georgetown University (LLM)

William Cleveland Mims (born June 20, 1957) is an American jurist and senior justice on the Supreme Court of Virginia. He is a former member of the Virginia General Assembly and Attorney General of Virginia. He is the second person in Virginia history to serve in these three offices. He presently is a lecturer and director of the pre-law program at Christopher Newport University, and swore in Governor Abigail Spanberger on January 17, 2026.

== Early life and education ==
Mims was born and grew up in Harrisonburg, Virginia, and graduated from Harrisonburg High School. He is an Eagle Scout. Mims graduated from the College of William & Mary, where he was student body president. He is a member of the Phi Eta Sigma, Phi Alpha Theta, and Omicron Delta Kappa honorary societies. He has law degrees from George Washington University (J.D.) and Georgetown University (LL.M.).

== Early career and private practice ==
Mims served as deputy legislative director to U.S. Senator Paul S. Trible Jr. from 1983 to 1985, and as chief of staff to Congressman Frank R. Wolf from 1985 to 1987. He practiced law in Leesburg, Virginia from 1987 to 2005. He has taught as an adjunct professor, at George Mason University School of Law (now Antonin Scalia Law School) and Appalachian School of Law. He briefly was a partner in the Hunton & Williams law firm in 2010, prior to joining the Supreme Court.

== General Assembly ==
Mims was elected as a Republican to the Virginia House of Delegates in 1991 and the Senate of Virginia in 1998, serving a total of 14 years. While in the General Assembly, he also served as chair of the Virginia Housing Commission and the Virginia Code Commission and vice-chair of the Joint Commission on Health Care. His legislative accomplishments included creating the Virginia Higher Education Tuition Trust Fund (now called Virginia 529). He also sponsored numerous successful bills relating to the rights of crime victims, improving traffic safety, and reforming mental health policies.

== Office of the Attorney General ==
Attorney General Robert F. McDonnell appointed Mims as chief deputy attorney general in January 2006. He was responsible for the day-to-day operations of the Office of the Attorney General, with more than 300 attorneys and staff. In that role, he also coordinated Virginia's legal response to the Virginia Tech shooting, including the mediated settlement of all but two liability claims, and the re-regulation of Virginia's electric utilities. When McDonnell resigned as attorney general to run for governor, the General Assembly unanimously elected Mims to complete McDonnell's term. Mims did not seek election to a full term and was succeeded by Kenneth Cuccinelli in January 2010.

== Supreme Court of Virginia ==
The General Assembly unanimously elected Mims to the Virginia Supreme Court on March 10, 2010. He took the oath of office on April 1, 2010. The 100th justice in the history of Virginia, Mims filled a vacancy created by the retirement of Justice Barbara Milano Keenan upon her appointment to the United States Court of Appeals for the Fourth Circuit. Mims did not seek reappointment to the court when his term ended on March 31, 2022.

== Civic involvement and personal life ==
Mims has served in numerous capacities relating to improving mental health and foster care policies. These include service on the boards of Voices for Virginia's Children, the Richmond Behavioral Health Authority, the Virginia Health Care Foundation, and the Commission on Mental Health Law Reform. He has served on the Board of Governors of the Virginia Bar Association. He is an elder at his church. He frequently authors "Faith & Values" guest columns for the Richmond Times-Dispatch, and speaks often throughout Virginia on the topics of justice and servant leadership.

Mims has received honorary degrees from Bridgewater College and Longwood University, the William B. Spong Award from William & Mary School of Law, and the Outstanding Eagle Scout Award from the National Association of Eagle Scouts. He has delivered the Madison Vision Series lecture at James Madison University and the Convocation address at the College of William & Mary.

Mims is married to Jane Mims. They have three adult daughters, two sons-in-law, and five grandchildren. An avid marathoner and occasional ultra-marathoner, he ran in the 2013 Boston Marathon and crossed the finish line shortly before the two bombs exploded.

== Notes ==
Legal offices
Preceded by Bob McDonnell	Attorney General of Virginia; 2009–2010	Succeeded by Ken Cuccinelli
Preceded by Barbara Milano Keenan	Justice of the Supreme Court of Virginia; 2010–2022	Succeeded by Thomas P. Mann
