= 2025 Virginia House of Delegates election =

- November 4, 2025

All 100 seats in the Virginia House of Delegates 51 seats needed for a majority
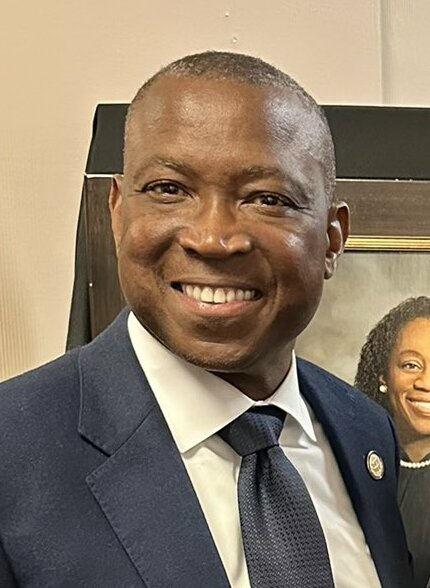

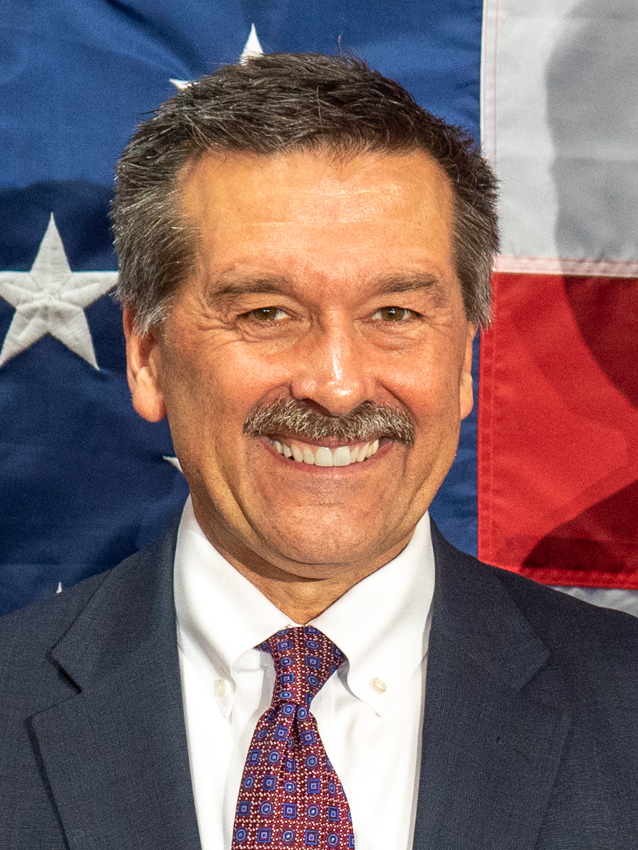
	Majority party	Minority party
Leader	Don Scott	Terry Kilgore
Party	Democratic	Republican
Leader since	June 1, 2022	June 1, 2025
Leader's seat	88th–Portsmouth	45th–Scott
Last election	51 seats, 49.50%	49 seats, 47.74%
Seats after	64	36
Seat change	▲13	▼13
Popular vote	1,926,456	1,373,057
Percentage	57.58%	41.04%
Swing	▲8.08%	▼6.70%
- Democratic hold Democratic gain Republican hold 40–50% 50–60% 60–70% 70–80% 80–90% >90% 50–60% 60–70% 70–80% 80–90%
Speaker before election
Don Scott
Democratic
Elected Speaker
Don Scott
Democratic

The 2025 Virginia House of Delegates election was held on Tuesday, November 4, 2025, to elect members of the 164th Virginia General Assembly. All 100 delegates are elected to two-year terms in single-member districts. Nomination primaries conducted by the Department of Elections were held June 17, 2025. Three incumbents, Democrats Delores McQuinn and Patrick Hope, and Republican Terry Austin, faced primary challengers, none of which were successful.

The House elections were held concurrently with the gubernatorial, lieutenant gubernatorial, and attorney general elections. The in-person early voting period ran from September 19 to November 1, 2025.

Democrats won in a landslide, gaining 13 seats, greatly expanding their majority in the House of Delegates, and gaining their largest majority since 1987. Don Scott was re-elected Speaker after the election. Notably, House Dean Bobby Orrock, first elected in 1989, was defeated in his attempt for a 19th term.

== Background ==
Harris 40–50% 50–60% 60–70% 70–80% 80–90% / Trump 40–50% 50–60% 60–70% 70–80% 80–90%

In the 2024 presidential election, Kamala Harris won 59 districts, while Donald Trump won 41. Republicans represent eight districts won by Harris in 2024. Following the 2023 election, Democrats regained control of the House of Delegates that was lost to the Republicans in 2021. Democrats held a narrow majority of 51 seats prior to the election.

== Retirements ==
Five incumbents, all Republican, did not seek re-election.

=== Republican ===
1. District 33: Todd Gilbert resigned his seat July 14 to be appointed interim United States Attorney for the Western District of Virginia
2. District 46: Jed Arnold retired.
3. District 49: Danny Marshall retired.
4. District 62: Nick Freitas retired.
5. District 89: Baxter Ennis retired.

== Special elections ==
Two special elections were held for the 163rd Virginia General Assembly: one was held on January 9, 2024, and one was held on January 7, 2025.

=== District 48 (special) ===
Incumbent Republican Les Adams, first elected in 2013, resigned following being re-elected in December 2023.

2023 Virginia's 48th House of Delegates district special election
Party	Candidate	Votes	%
Republican	Eric J. Phillips	4,365	69.6
Democratic	Melody A. "Mel" Cartwright	1,904	30.3
Total votes		6,276	100.0
Republican hold			

=== District 26 (special) ===
Incumbent Democrat Kannan Srinivasan, first elected in 2023, ran for the Virginia State Senate special election in the 32nd district and announced his resignation effective January 7, 2025.

2025 Virginia's 26th House of Delegates district special election
Party	Candidate	Votes	%
Democratic	JJ Singh	6,404	62.4
Republican	Ram Venkatachalam	3,857	37.6
Total votes		10,261	100.0
Democratic hold			

== Overview ==
↓
64	36
Democratic	Republican

Party		Candidates	Votes		Seats		
Party		Candidates	No.	%	Before	After	+/–
	Democratic	100	1,926,456	57.58	51	64	▲13
	Republican	80	1,373,057	41.04	49	36	▼13
-	Write-ins	-	32,805	0.98	0	0	0
	Independent	6	11,649	0.35	0	0	0
	Libertarian	2	1,853	0.06	0	0	0
Total			3,345,820	100.00	100	100	

== Close races ==
Seats where the margin of victory was under 10%:

1. House Delegate district 34, 0.89%
2. House Delegate district 30, 1.93% (gain)
3. House Delegate district 69, 3.30% (gain)
4. House Delegate district 73, 3.66% (gain)
5. House Delegate district 66, 4.38% (gain)
6. House Delegate district 74, 5.04%
7. House Delegate district 100, 5.86%
8. House Delegate district 40, 5.91%
9. House Delegate district 49, 6.01%
10. House Delegate district 75, 6.11% (gain)
11. House Delegate district 64, 6.49% (gain)
12. House Delegate district 71, 6.52% (gain)
13. House Delegate district 41, 6.70% (gain)
14. House Delegate district 82, 7.79% (gain)
15. House Delegate district 99, 7.91%
16. House Delegate district 86, 7.94% (gain)
17. House Delegate district 83, 9.02%
18. House Delegate district 89, 9.41% (gain)
19. House Delegate district 22, 9.93% (gain)

== Predictions ==
Source	Ranking	As of
State Navigate	Solid D	November 3, 2025

== Summary of results by district ==
District	2024 Pres.	Incumbent	Party	Elected Delegate	Outcome
1st	D +59.5	Patrick Hope	Dem	Patrick Hope	Dem
2nd	D +57.5	Adele McClure	Dem	Adele McClure	Dem
3rd	D +56.6	Alfonso Lopez	Dem	Alfonso Lopez	Dem
4th	D +48.0	Charniele Herring	Dem	Charniele Herring	Dem
5th	D +58.9	Elizabeth Bennett-Parker	Dem	Elizabeth Bennett-Parker	Dem
6th	D +32.5	Rip Sullivan	Dem	Rip Sullivan	Dem
7th	D +44.6	Karen Keys-Gamarra	Dem	Karen Keys-Gamarra	Dem
8th	D +35.9	Irene Shin	Dem	Irene Shin	Dem
9th	D +24.6	Karrie Delaney	Dem	Karrie Delaney	Dem
10th	D +23.6	Dan Helmer	Dem	Dan Helmer	Dem
11th	D +35.4	David Bulova	Dem	David Bulova	Dem
12th	D +41.7	Holly Seibold	Dem	Holly Seibold	Dem
13th	D +46.3	Marcus Simon	Dem	Marcus Simon	Dem
14th	D +32.8	Vivian Watts	Dem	Vivian Watts	Dem
15th	D +29.7	Laura Cohen	Dem	Laura Cohen	Dem
16th	D +38.7	Paul Krizek	Dem	Paul Krizek	Dem
17th	D +42.5	Mark Sickles	Dem	Mark Sickles	Dem
18th	D +29.7	Kathy Tran	Dem	Kathy Tran	Dem
19th	D +31.3	Rozia Henson	Dem	Rozia Henson	Dem
20th	D +13.7	Michelle Maldonado	Dem	Michelle Maldonado	Dem
21st	D +5.2	Josh Thomas	Dem	Josh Thomas	Dem
22nd	D +0.7	Ian Lovejoy	Rep	Elizabeth Guzmán	Dem
23rd	D +35.1	Candi King	Dem	Candi King	Dem
24th	D +25.5	Luke Torian	Dem	Luke Torian	Dem
25th	D +24.6	Briana Sewell	Dem	Briana Sewell	Dem
26th	D +21.8	Jas Jeet Singh	Dem	Jas Jeet Singh	Dem
27th	D +19.9	Atoosa Reaser	Dem	Atoosa Reaser	Dem
28th	D +23.4	David Reid	Dem	David Reid	Dem
29th	D +17.6	Marty Martinez	Dem	Marty Martinez	Dem
30th	R +1.2	Geary Higgins	Rep	John McAuliff	Dem
31st	R +27.3	Delores Oates	Rep	Delores Oates	Rep
32nd	R +20.7	Bill Wiley	Rep	Bill Wiley	Rep
33rd	R +47.7	Vacant (Note: Incumbent Republican Todd Gilbert resigned on July 14, 2025, to become interim U.S. attorney of the Western District of Virginia)		Justin Pence	Rep
34th	R +6.5	Tony Wilt	Rep	Tony Wilt	Rep
35th	R +44.0	Chris Runion	Rep	Chris Runion	Rep
36th	R +18.8	Ellen Campbell	Rep	Ellen Campbell	Rep
37th	R +39.9	Terry Austin	Rep	Terry Austin	Rep
38th	D +24.1	Sam Rasoul	Dem	Sam Rasoul	Dem
39th	R +40.7	Will Davis	Rep	Will Davis	Rep
40th	R +9.3	Joseph McNamara	Rep	Joseph McNamara	Rep
41st	R +2.9	Chris Obenshain	Rep	Lily Franklin	Dem
42nd	R +24.8	Jason Ballard	Rep	Jason Ballard	Rep
43rd	R +68.4	Will Morefield	Rep	Will Morefield	Rep
44th	R +53.0	Israel O'Quinn	Rep	Israel O'Quinn	Rep
45th	R +66.9	Terry Kilgore	Rep	Terry Kilgore	Rep
46th	R +58.1	Jed Arnold	Rep	Mitchell Cornett	Rep
47th	R +53.8	Wren Williams	Rep	Wren Williams	Rep
48th	R +27.8	Eric Philips	Rep	Eric Philips	Rep
49th	R +8.3	Danny Marshall	Rep	Madison Whittle	Rep
50th	R +19.3	Tommy Wright	Rep	Tommy Wright	Rep
51st	R +51.5	Eric Zehr	Rep	Eric Zehr	Rep
52nd	R +11.7	Wendell Walker	Rep	Wendell Walker	Rep
53rd	R +38.5	Tim Griffin	Rep	Tim Griffin	Rep
54th	D +60.8	Katrina Callsen	Dem	Katrina Callsen	Dem
55th	D +21.9	Amy Laufer	Dem	Amy Laufer	Dem
56th	R +22.3	Tom Garrett	Rep	Tom Garrett	Rep
57th	D +9.4	David Owen	Rep	May Nivar	Dem
58th	D +17.1	Rodney Willett	Dem	Rodney Willett	Dem
59th	R +15.8	Buddy Fowler	Rep	Buddy Fowler	Rep
60th	R +28.2	Scott Wyatt	Rep	Scott Wyatt	Rep
61st	R +25.9	Michael Webert	Rep	Michael Webert	Rep
62nd	R +23.3	Nick Freitas	Rep	Karen Hamilton	Rep
63rd	R +18.6	Phillip Scott	Rep	Phillip Scott	Rep
64th	R +1.9	Paul Milde	Rep	Stacey Carroll	Dem
65th	D +9.5	Joshua Cole	Dem	Joshua Cole	Dem
66th	R +2.4	Bobby Orrock	Rep	Nicole Cole	Dem
67th	R +20.1	Hillary Kent	Rep	Hillary Kent	Rep
68th	R +33.7	Keith Hodges	Rep	Keith Hodges	Rep
69th	R +1.6	Chad Green	Rep	Mark Downey	Dem
70th	D +20.6	Shelly Simonds	Dem	Shelly Simonds	Dem
71st	D +4.9	Amanda Batten	Rep	Jessica Anderson	Dem
72nd	R +23.4	Lee Ware	Rep	Lee Ware	Rep
73rd	D +1.1	Mark Earley	Rep	Leslie Mehta	Dem
74th	R +8.3	Mike Cherry	Rep	Mike Cherry	Rep
75th	D +6.6	Carrie Coyner	Rep	Lindsey Dougherty	Dem
76th	D +27.2	Debra Gardner	Dem	Debra Gardner	Dem
77th	D +50.6	Michael Jones	Dem	Michael Jones	Dem
78th	D +54.7	Betsy Carr	Dem	Betsy Carr	Dem
79th	D +78.8	Rae Cousins	Dem	Rae Cousins	Dem
80th	D +51.5	Destiny LeVere Bolling	Dem	Destiny LeVere Bolling	Dem
81st	D +34.6	Delores McQuinn	Dem	Delores McQuinn	Dem
82nd	D +4.2	Kim Taylor	Rep	Kimberly Pope Adams	Dem
83rd	R +7.9	Otto Wachsmann	Rep	Otto Wachsmann	Rep
84th	D +14.5	Nadarius Clark	Dem	Nadarius Clark	Dem
85th	D +37.1	Cia Price	Dem	Cia Price	Dem
86th	D +1.6	A.C. Cordoza	Rep	Virgil Thornton Sr.	Dem
87th	D +51.9	Jeion Ward	Dem	Jeion Ward	Dem
88th	D +35.7	Don Scott	Dem	Don Scott	Dem
89th	D +3.0	Baxter Ennis	Rep	Kacey Carnegie	Dem
90th	R +17.3	Jay Leftwich	Rep	Jay Leftwich	Rep
91st	D +35.1	Cliff Hayes	Dem	Cliff Hayes	Dem
92nd	D +52.4	Bonita Anthony	Dem	Bonita Anthony	Dem
93rd	D +48.3	Jackie Glass	Dem	Jackie Glass	Dem
94th	D +15.1	Phil Hernandez	Dem	Phil Hernandez	Dem
95th	D +20.1	Alex Askew	Dem	Alex Askew	Dem
96th	D +15.5	Kelly Convirs-Fowler	Dem	Kelly Convirs-Fowler	Dem
97th	D +7.9	Michael Feggans	Dem	Michael Feggans	Dem
98th	R +14.6	Barry Knight	Rep	Barry Knight	Rep
99th	R +4.8	Anne Tata	Rep	Anne Tata	Rep
100th	R +5.4	Robert Bloxom	Rep	Robert Bloxom	Rep

== District 1 ==
2025 Virginia House of Delegates District 1 election
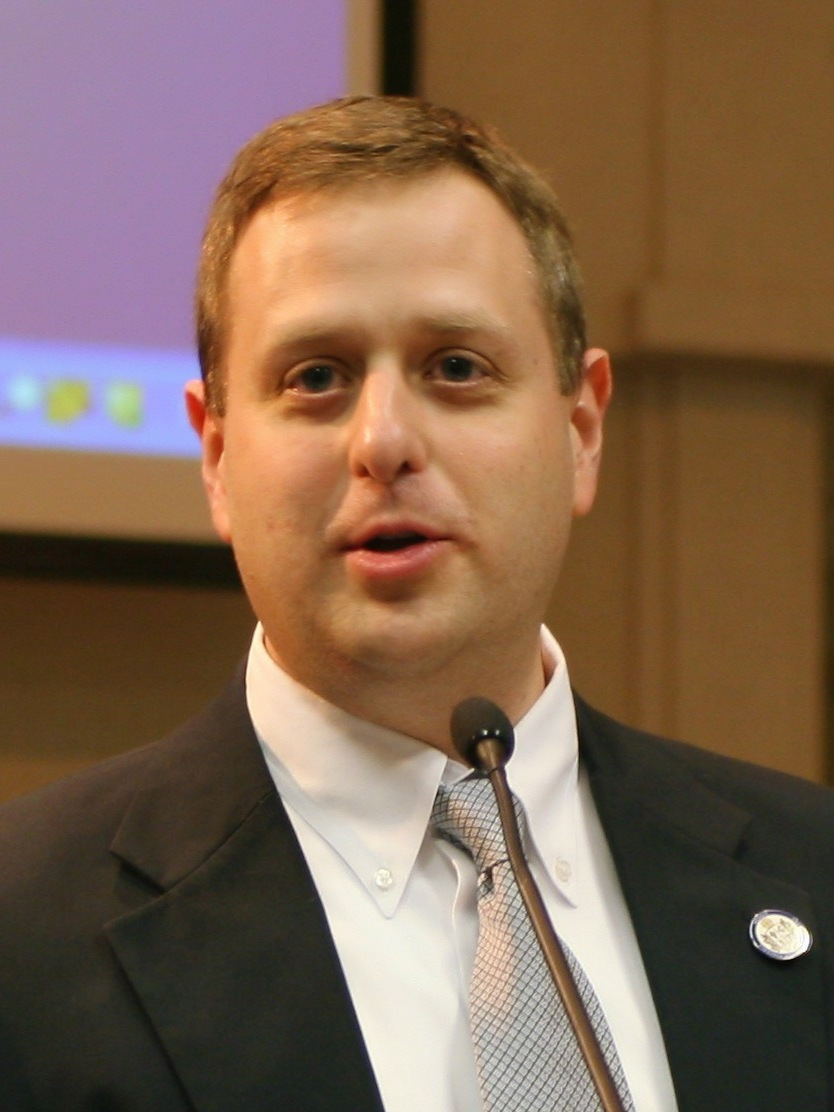

Candidate	Patrick Hope	Bill Moher
Party	Democratic	Republican
Popular vote	33,850	7,595
Percentage	81.49%	18.28%
- Precinct results Hope: 70–80% 80–90%
State delegate before election
Patrick Hope
Democratic
State delegate after election
Patrick Hope
Democratic

House District 1 contains portions of Arlington County. Incumbent delegate is Democrat Patrick Hope, who was first elected in 2009. He was re-elected in 2025.

=== Democratic primary ===
==== Nominee ====
- Patrick Hope, incumbent

==== Eliminated in primary ====
- Sean Epstein, consultant
- Arjoon Srikanth, software engineer

==== Results ====
2025 Virginia's 1st House of Delegates district Democratic primary
Party	Candidate	Votes	%
Democratic	Patrick Hope (incumbent)	8,959	72.38
Democratic	Arjoon Srikanth	2,334	18.86
Democratic	Sean Epstein	1,085	8.77
Total votes		12,378	100.00%

=== Republican primary ===
==== Nominee ====
- Bill Moher, businessman and nominee for VA-4 in 2024

=== General election ===
Predictions

Source	Ranking	As of
State Navigate	Solid D	August 15, 2025

==== Results ====
2025 Virginia 1st House of Delegates District general election
Party	Candidate	Votes	%
Democratic	Patrick Hope (incumbent)	33,850	81.49%
Republican	Bill Moher	7,595	18.28%
Write-in		96	0.23%
Total votes		41,541	100.00%
Democratic hold			

== District 2 ==
2025 Virginia House of Delegates District 2 election
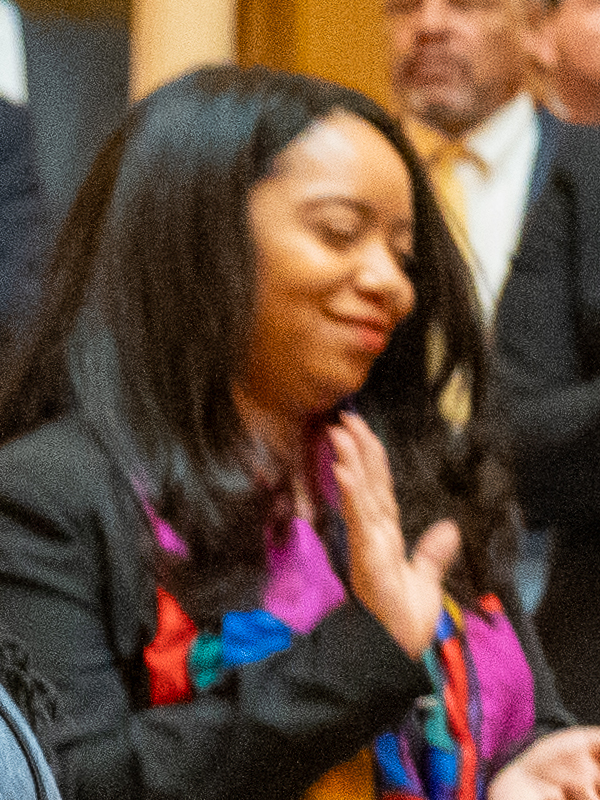

Candidate	Adele McClure	Wendy Sigley
Party	Democratic	Republican
Popular vote	26,953	6,072
Percentage	81.48%	18.36%
State delegate before election
Adele McClure
Democratic
State delegate after election
Adele McClure
Democratic

House District 2 contains portions of Arlington County. Incumbent delegate is Democrat Adele McClure, who was first elected in 2023. She was re-elected in 2025.

=== Democratic primary ===
==== Nominee ====
- Adele McClure, incumbent

=== Republican primary ===
==== Nominee ====
- Wendy Sigley

=== General election ===
==== Endorsements ====
Adele McClure (D)

Organizations

- LGBTQ+ Victory Fund

Predictions

Source	Ranking	As of
State Navigate	Solid D	August 15, 2025

==== Results ====
2025 Virginia 2nd House of Delegates District general election
Party	Candidate	Votes	%
Democratic	Adele McClure (incumbent)	26,953	81.48%
Republican	Wendy Sigley	6,072	18.36%
Write-in		55	0.17%
Total votes		33,080	100.00%
Democratic hold			

== District 3 ==
2025 Virginia House of Delegates District 3 election
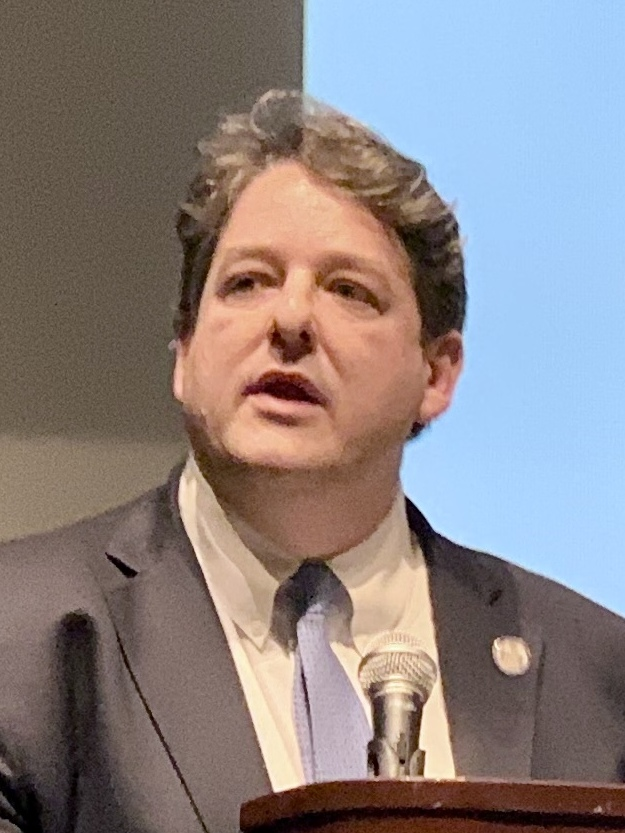
Candidate	Alfonso Lopez
Party	Democratic
Popular vote	27,641
Percentage	95.85%
State delegate before election
Alfonso Lopez
Democratic
State delegate after election
Alfonso Lopez
Democratic

House District 3 is located partially within the city of Alexandria and Arlington County. Incumbent delegate is Democrat Alfonso Lopez, who was first elected in 2011. He was re-elected in 2025.

=== Democratic primary ===
==== Nominee ====
- Alfonso Lopez, incumbent

=== General election ===
Predictions

Source	Ranking	As of
State Navigate	Solid D	August 15, 2025

==== Results ====
2025 Virginia 3rd House of Delegates District general election
Party	Candidate	Votes	%
Democratic	Alfonso Lopez (incumbent)	27,641	95.85%
Write-in		1,309	4.15%
Total votes		28,950	100.00%
Democratic hold			

== District 4 ==
2025 Virginia House of Delegates District 4 election
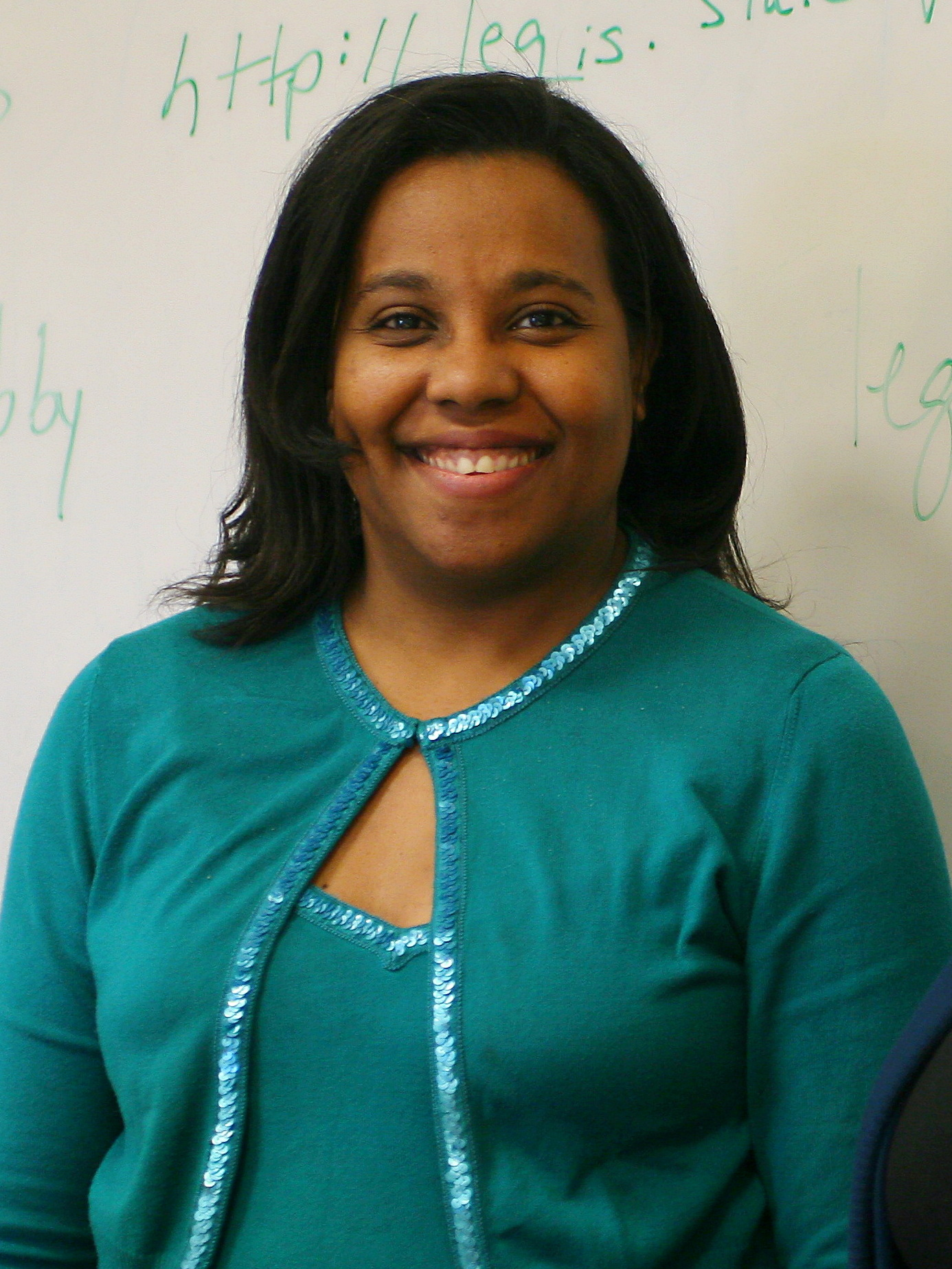
Candidate	Charniele Herring
Party	Democratic
Popular vote	18,268
Percentage	95.85%
State delegate before election
Charniele Herring
Democratic
State delegate after election
Charniele Herring
Democratic

House District 4 is located partially within the city of Alexandria and Fairfax County. Incumbent delegate is Democrat Charniele Herring, who was first elected in 2009. She was re-elected in 2025.

=== Democratic primary ===
==== Nominee ====
- Charniele Herring, incumbent

=== General election ===
Predictions

Source	Ranking	As of
State Navigate	Solid D	August 15, 2025

==== Results ====
2025 Virginia 4th House of Delegates District general election
Party	Candidate	Votes	%
Democratic	Charniele Herring (incumbent)	18,268	95.85%
Write-in		791	4.15%
Total votes		19,059	100.00%
Democratic hold			

== District 5 ==
2025 Virginia House of Delegates District 5 election
Candidate	Elizabeth Bennett-Parker
Party	Democratic
Popular vote	33,909
Percentage	95.24%
State delegate before election
Elizabeth Bennett-Parker
Democratic
State delegate after election
Elizabeth Bennett-Parker
Democratic

House District 5 contains portions of the city of Alexandria. Incumbent delegate is Democrat Elizabeth Bennett-Parker, who was first elected in 2021. She was re-elected in 2025.

=== Democratic primary ===
==== Nominee ====
- Elizabeth Bennett-Parker, incumbent

=== General election ===
Predictions

Source	Ranking	As of
State Navigate	Solid D	August 15, 2025

==== Results ====
2025 Virginia 5th House of Delegates District general election
Party	Candidate	Votes	%
Democratic	Elizabeth Bennett-Parker (incumbent)	33,909	95.24%
Write-in		1,693	4.76%
Total votes		35,602	100.00%
Democratic hold			

== District 6 ==
2025 Virginia House of Delegates District 6 election
Candidate	Rip Sullivan	Kristin Hoffman
Party	Democratic	Republican
Popular vote	27,068	13,449
Percentage	66.71%	33.15%
State delegate before election
Rip Sullivan
Democratic
State delegate after election
Rip Sullivan
Democratic

House District 6 contains portions of Fairfax County. Incumbent delegate is Democrat Rip Sullivan, who was first elected in 2014. He was re-elected in 2025.

=== Democratic primary ===
==== Nominee ====
- Rip Sullivan, incumbent

=== Republican primary ===
==== Nominee ====
- Kristin Hoffman. retired IT Executive and nominee for this seat in 2023

=== General election ===
Predictions

Source	Ranking	As of
State Navigate	Solid D	August 15, 2025

==== Results ====
2025 Virginia 6th House of Delegates District general election
Party	Candidate	Votes	%
Democratic	Rip Sullivan (incumbent)	27,068	66.71%
Republican	Kristin Hoffman	13,449	33.15%
Write-in		58	0.14%
Total votes		40,575	100.00%
Democratic hold			

== District 7 ==
2025 Virginia House of Delegates District 7 election
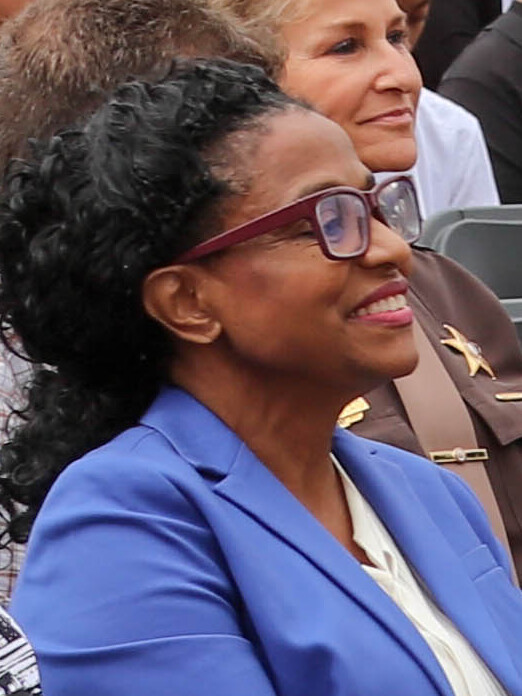

Candidate	Karen Keys-Gamarra	Cassandra Aucoin
Party	Democratic	Republican
Popular vote	30,775	9,991
Percentage	75.36%	24.47%
State delegate before election
Karen Keys-Gamarra
Democratic
State delegate after election
TBD

House District 7 contains portions of Fairfax County. Incumbent delegate is Democrat Karen Keys-Gamarra, who was first elected in 2023.

=== Democratic primary ===
==== Nominee ====
- Karen Keys-Gamarra, incumbent

=== Republican primary ===
==== Nominee ====
- Cassandra Aucoin, retired federal employee and at-large candidate for Fairfax County School Board in 2023

=== General election ===
Predictions

Source	Ranking	As of
State Navigate	Solid D	August 15, 2025

==== Results ====
2025 Virginia 7th House of Delegates District general election
Party	Candidate	Votes	%
Democratic	Karen Keys-Gamarra (incumbent)	30,775	75.36%
Republican	Cassandra Aucoin	9,991	24.47%
Write-in		69	0.17%
Total votes		40,835	100.00%
Democratic hold			

== District 8 ==
2025 Virginia House of Delegates District 8 election
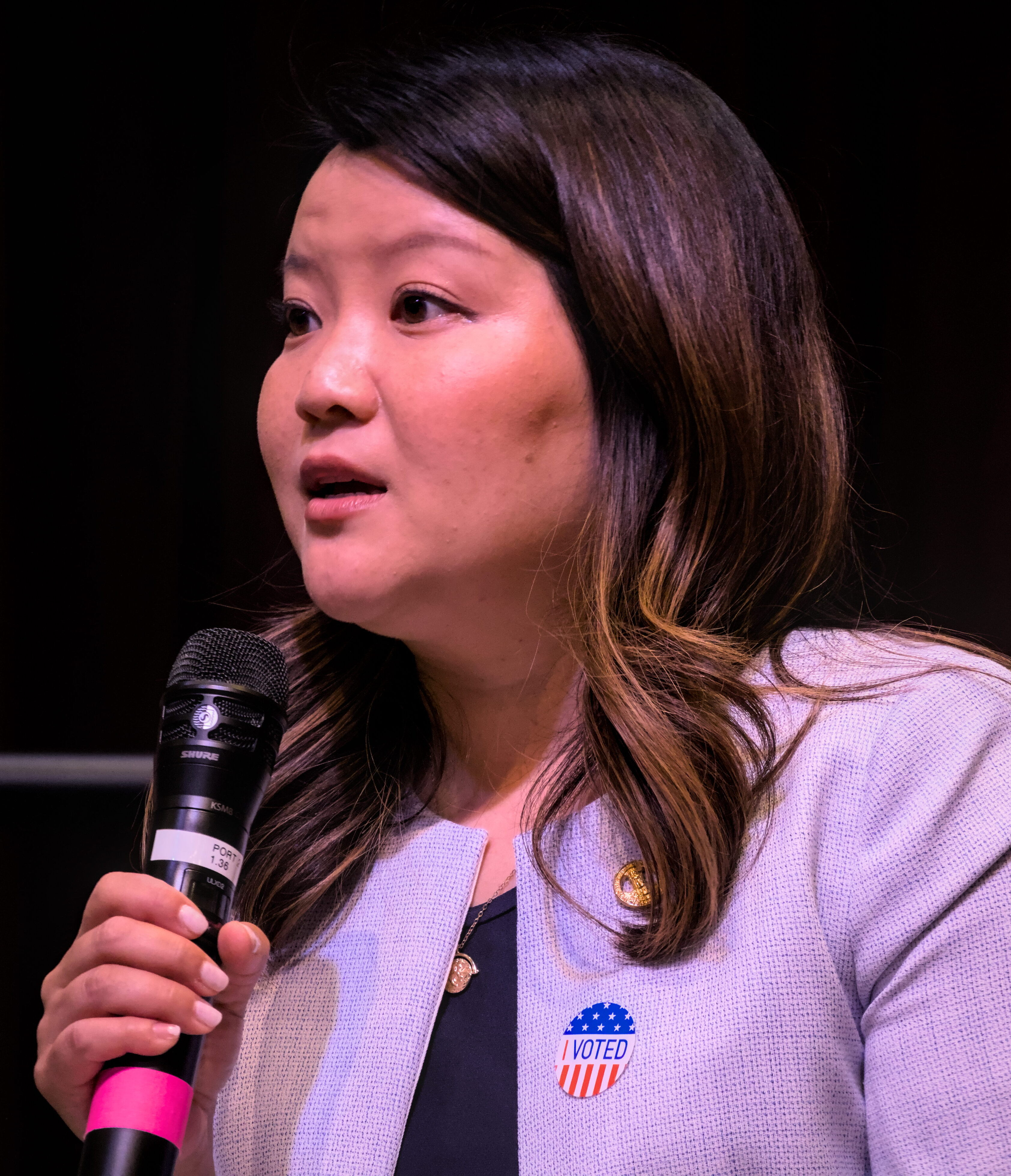

Candidate	Irene Shin	Indira Massey
Party	Democratic	Republican
Popular vote	22,969	8,002
Percentage	73.98%	25.77%
State delegate before election
Irene Shin
Democratic
State delegate after election
Irene Shin
Democratic

House District 8 contains portions of Fairfax County. Incumbent delegate is Democrat Irene Shin, who was first elected in 2021.

=== Democratic primary ===
==== Nominee ====
- Irene Shin, incumbent

=== Republican primary ===
==== Nominee ====
- Indira Massey, nonprofit founder and nominee for Fairfax County Board of Supervisors Hunter Mill District in 2023

=== General election ===
Predictions

Source	Ranking	As of
State Navigate	Solid D	August 15, 2025

==== Results ====
2025 Virginia 8th House of Delegates District general election
Party	Candidate	Votes	%
Democratic	Irene Shin (incumbent)	22,969	73.98%
Republican	Indira Massey	8,002	25.77%
Write-in		76	0.24%
Total votes		31,047	100.00%
Democratic hold			

== District 9 ==
2025 Virginia House of Delegates District 9 election
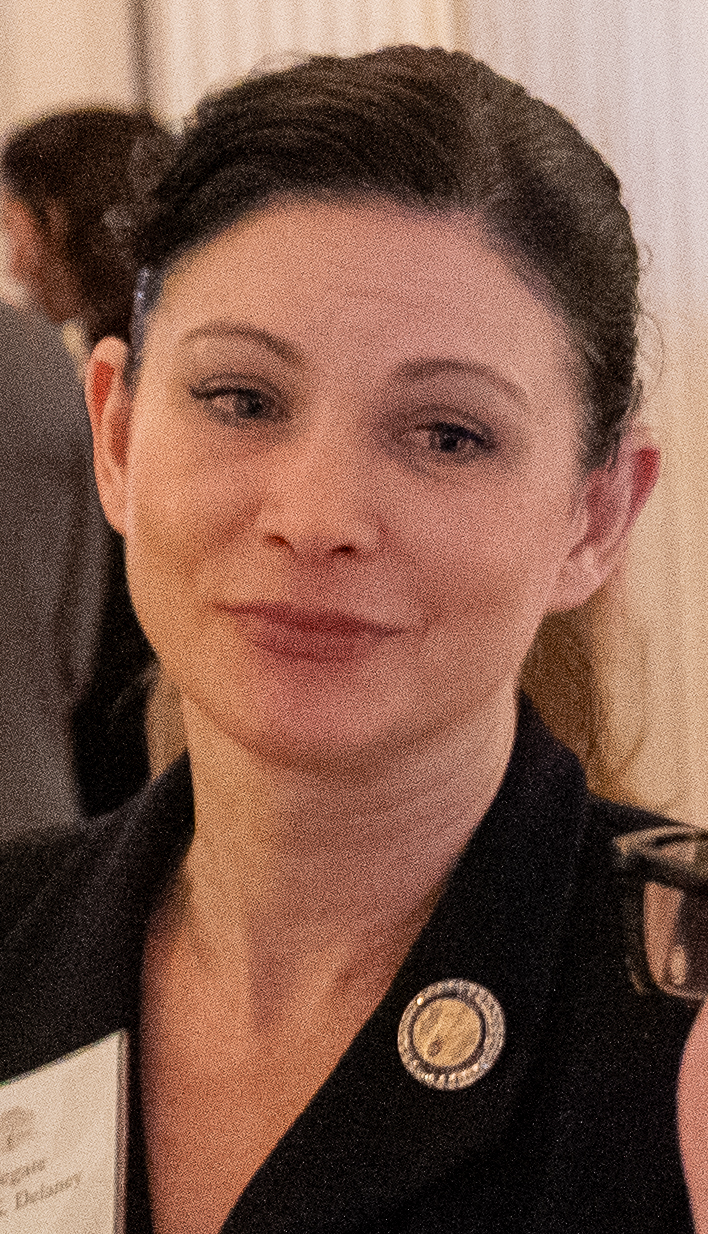

Candidate	Karrie Delaney	Nhan Huynh
Party	Democratic	Republican
Popular vote	22,471	10,066
Percentage	68.93%	30.88%
State delegate before election
Karrie Delaney
Democratic
State delegate after election
Karrie Delaney
Democratic

House District 9 contains portions of Fairfax County. Incumbent delegate is Democrat Karrie Delaney, who was first elected in 2017.

=== Democratic primary ===
==== Nominee ====
- Karrie Delaney, incumbent

=== Republican primary ===
==== Nominee ====
- Nhan Huynh, IT consultant and nominee for this seat in 2023

=== General election ===
Predictions

Source	Ranking	As of
State Navigate	Solid D	August 15, 2025

==== Results ====
2025 Virginia 9th House of Delegates District general election
Party	Candidate	Votes	%
Democratic	Karrie Delaney (incumbent)	22,471	68.93%
Republican	Nhan Huynh	10,066	30.88%
Write-in		64	0.20%
Total votes		32,601	100.00%
Democratic hold			

== District 10 ==
2025 Virginia House of Delegates District 10 election
Candidate	Dan Helmer	David Guill
Party	Democratic	Republican
Popular vote	23,946	11,517
Percentage	67.38%	32.40%
State delegate before election
Dan Helmer
Democratic
State delegate after election
Dan Helmer
Democratic

House District 10 contains portions of Fairfax County. Incumbent delegate is Democrat Dan Helmer, who was first elected in 2019.

=== Democratic primary ===
==== Nominee ====
- Dan Helmer, incumbent

=== Republican primary ===
==== Nominee ====
- David Guill, businessman

=== General election ===
Predictions

Source	Ranking	As of
State Navigate	Solid D	August 15, 2025

==== Results ====
2025 Virginia 10th House of Delegates District general election
Party	Candidate	Votes	%
Democratic	Dan Helmer (incumbent)	23,946	67.38%
Republican	David Guill	11,517	32.40%
Write-in		78	0.22%
Total votes		35,541	100.00%
Democratic hold			

== District 11 ==
2025 Virginia House of Delegates District 11 election
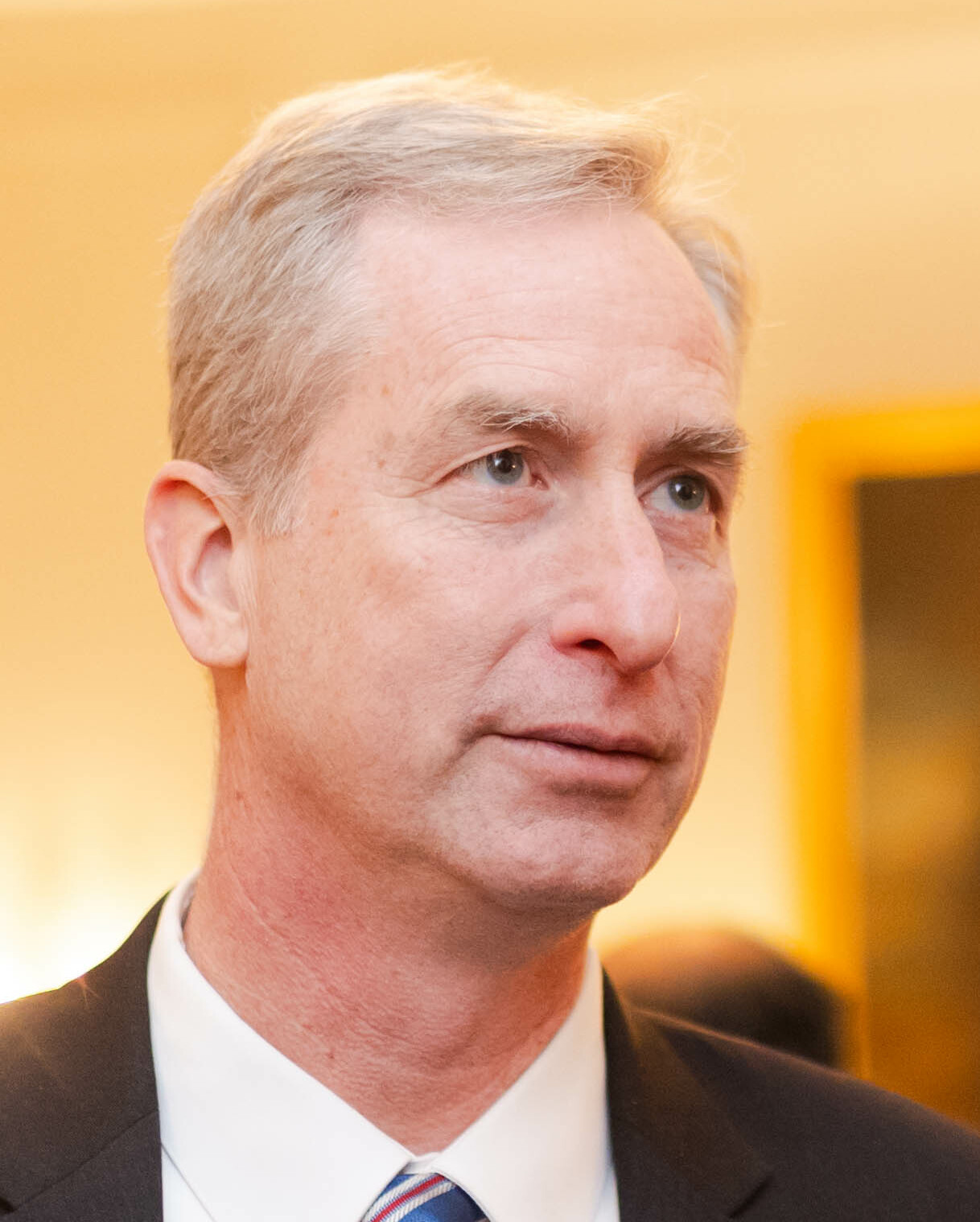

Candidate	David Bulova	Adam Wise
Party	Democratic	Republican
Popular vote	23,402	8,193
Percentage	72.51%	25.38%
State delegate before election
David Bulova
Democratic
State delegate after election
David Bulova
Democratic

House District 11 contains all of the city of Fairfax and portions of Fairfax County. Incumbent delegate is Democrat David Bulova, who was first elected in 2005.

=== Democratic primary ===
==== Nominee ====
- David Bulova, incumbent

=== Republican primary ===
==== Nominee ====
- Adam Wise, firearms instructor

=== Forward primary ===
==== Nominee ====
- Brandon Givens, special education teacher

=== General election ===
Predictions

Source	Ranking	As of
State Navigate	Solid D	August 15, 2025

==== Results ====
2025 Virginia 11th House of Delegates District general election
Party	Candidate	Votes	%
Democratic	David Bulova (incumbent)	23,402	72.51%
Republican	Adam Wise	8,193	25.38%
Forward	Brandon Givens	620	1.92%
Write-in		60	0.19%
Total votes		32,275	100.00%
Democratic hold			

== District 12 ==
2025 Virginia House of Delegates District 12 election
Candidate	Holly Seibold	Nelson Figueroa-Velez
Party	Democratic	Republican
Popular vote	25,670	7,793
Percentage	76.51%	23.23%
State delegate before election
Holly Seibold
Democratic
State delegate after election
Holly Seibold
Democratic

House District 12 contains portions of Fairfax County. Incumbent delegate is Democrat Holly Seibold, who was first elected in 2023

=== Democratic primary ===
==== Nominee ====
- Holly Seibold, incumbent

=== Republican primary ===
==== Nominee ====
- Nelson Figueroa-Velez, attorney

=== General election ===
Predictions

Source	Ranking	As of
State Navigate	Solid D	August 15, 2025

==== Results ====
2025 Virginia 12th House of Delegates District general election
Party	Candidate	Votes	%
Democratic	Holly Seibold (incumbent)	25,670	76.51%
Republican	Nelson Figueroa-Velez	7,793	23.23%
Write-in		88	0.26%
Total votes		33,551	100.00%
Democratic hold			

== District 13 ==
2025 Virginia House of Delegates District 13 election
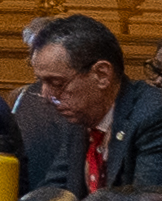

Candidate	Marcus Simon	Sylwia Oleksy
Party	Democratic	Republican
Popular vote	24,541	6,195
Percentage	76.65%	19.35%
State delegate before election
Marcus Simon
Democratic
State delegate after election
Marcus Simon
Democratic

House District 13 contains all of the city of Falls Church and portions of Fairfax County. Incumbent delegate is Democrat Marcus Simon, who was first elected in 2013.

=== Democratic primary ===
==== Nominee ====
- Marcus Simon, incumbent

=== Republican primary ===
==== Nominee ====
- Sylwia Oleksy

=== Libertarian primary ===
==== Nominee ====
- Dave Crance, regional hotel manager and nominee for this seat in 2023

=== General election ===
Predictions

Source	Ranking	As of
State Navigate	Solid D	August 15, 2025

==== Results ====
2025 Virginia 13th House of Delegates District general election
Party	Candidate	Votes	%
Democratic	Marcus Simon (incumbent)	24,541	76.65%
Republican	Sylwia Oleksy	6,195	19.35%
Libertarian	Dave Crance	1,221	3.81%
Write-in		58	0.18%
Total votes		32,015	100.00%
Democratic hold			

== District 14 ==
2025 Virginia House of Delegates District 14 election
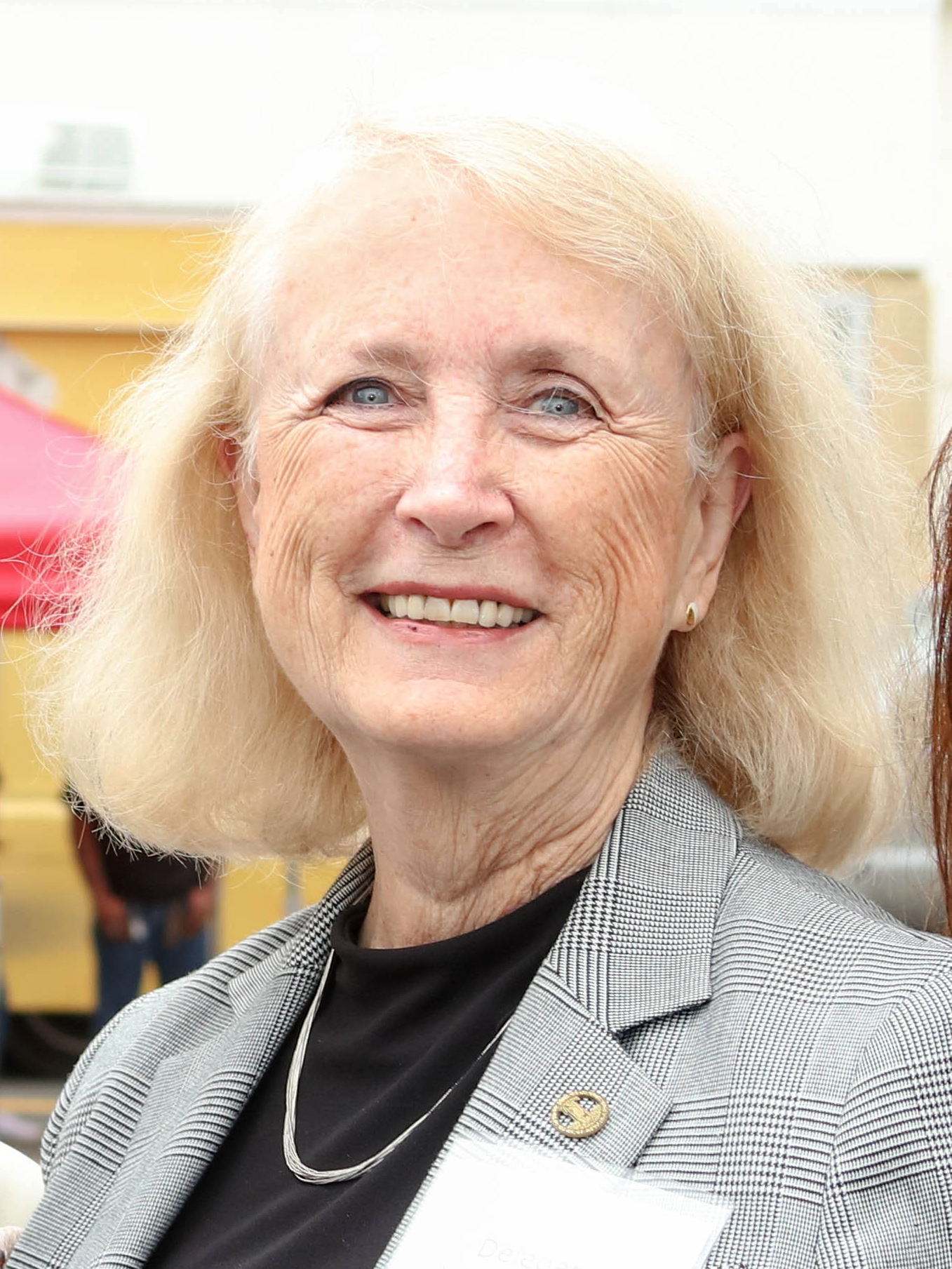

Candidate	Vivian Watts	Eric Johnson
Party	Democratic	Republican
Popular vote	20,711	7,338
Percentage	73.67%	26.10%
State delegate before election
Vivian Watts
Democratic
State delegate after election
Vivian Watts
Democratic

House District 14 contains portions of Fairfax County. Incumbent delegate is Democrat Vivian Watts, who was first elected in 1995.

=== Democratic primary ===
==== Nominee ====
- Vivian Watts, incumbent

=== Republican party ===
==== Nominee ====
- Eric Johnson, elementary school principal

=== General election ===
Predictions

Source	Ranking	As of
State Navigate	Solid D	August 15, 2025

==== Results ====
2025 Virginia 14th House of Delegates District general election
Party	Candidate	Votes	%
Democratic	Vivian Watts (incumbent)	20,711	73.67%
Republican	Eric Johnson	7,338	26.10%
Write-in		64	0.23%
Total votes		28,113	100.00%
Democratic hold			

== District 15 ==
2025 Virginia House of Delegates District 15 election
Candidate	Laura Jane Cohen	Saundra Davis
Party	Democratic	Republican
Popular vote	27,353	13,146
Percentage	67.39%	32.39%
State delegate before election
Laura Jane Cohen
Democratic
State delegate after election
Laura Jane Cohen
Democratic

House District 15 contains portions of Fairfax County. Incumbent delegate is Democrat Laura Jane Cohen, who was first elected in 2023.

=== Democratic primary ===
==== Nominee ====
- Laura Jane Cohen, incumbent

=== Republican primary ===
==== Nominee ====
- Saundra Davis, parental rights activist and at-large candidate for Fairfax County School Board in 2023

=== General election ===
Predictions

Source	Ranking	As of
State Navigate	Solid D	August 15, 2025

==== Results ====
2025 Virginia 15th House of Delegates District general election
Party	Candidate	Votes	%
Democratic	Laura Jane Cohen (incumbent)	27,353	67.39%
Republican	Saundra Davis	13,146	32.39%
Write-in		88	0.22%
Total votes		40,587	100.00%
Democratic hold			

== District 16 ==
2025 Virginia House of Delegates District 16 election
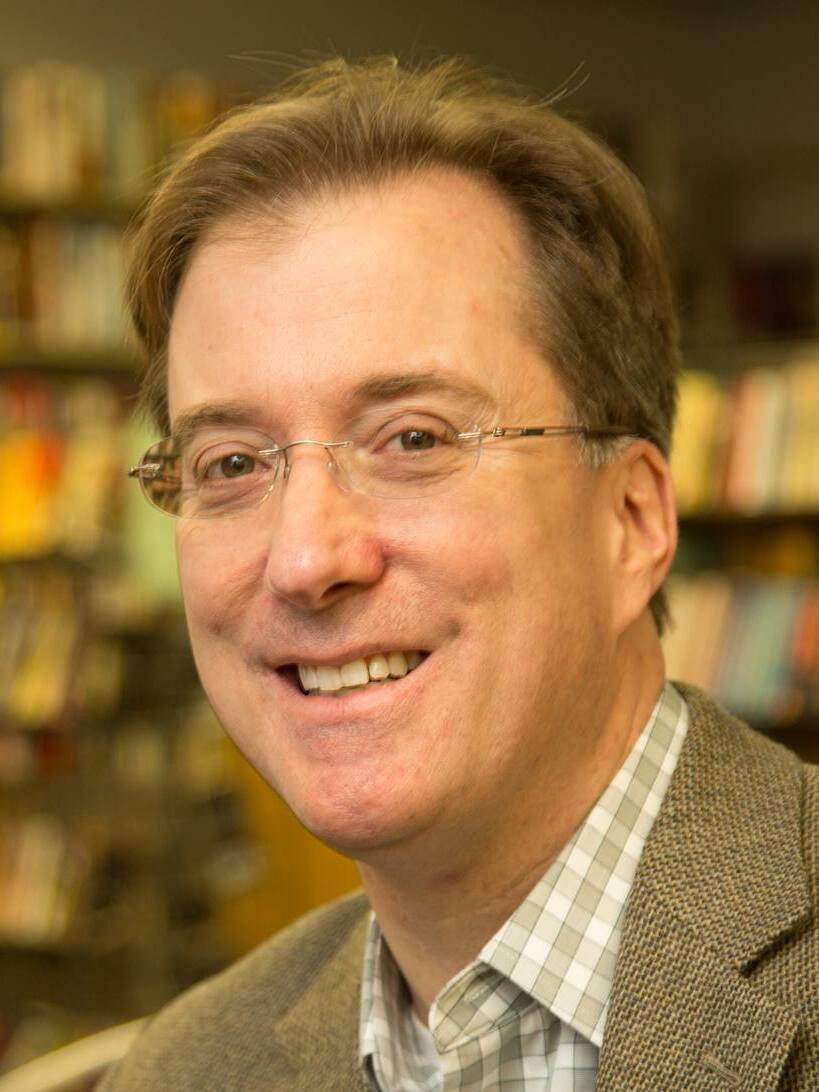

Candidate	Paul Krizek	Richard Hayden
Party	Democratic	Republican
Popular vote	22,048	8,275
Percentage	70.54%	26.47%
State delegate before election
Paul Krizek
Democratic
State delegate after election
Paul Krizek
Democratic

House District 16 contains portions of Fairfax County. Incumbent delegate is Democrat Paul Krizek, who was first elected in 2015.

=== Democratic primary ===
==== Nominee ====
- Paul Krizek, incumbent

=== Republican primary ===
==== Nominee ====
- Richard Hayden, attorney and nominee for the 44th District in 2019 and 2021

=== Independents ===
==== Declared ====
- Shelly Arnoldi, activist

=== General election ===
Predictions

Source	Ranking	As of
State Navigate	Solid D	August 15, 2025

==== Results ====
2025 Virginia 16th House of Delegates District general election
Party	Candidate	Votes	%
Democratic	Paul Krizek (incumbent)	22,048	70.54%
Republican	Richard Hayden	8,275	26.47%
Independent	Shelly Arnoldi	866	2.77%
Write-in		69	0.22%
Total votes		31,258	100.00%
Democratic hold			

== District 17 ==
2025 Virginia House of Delegates District 17 election
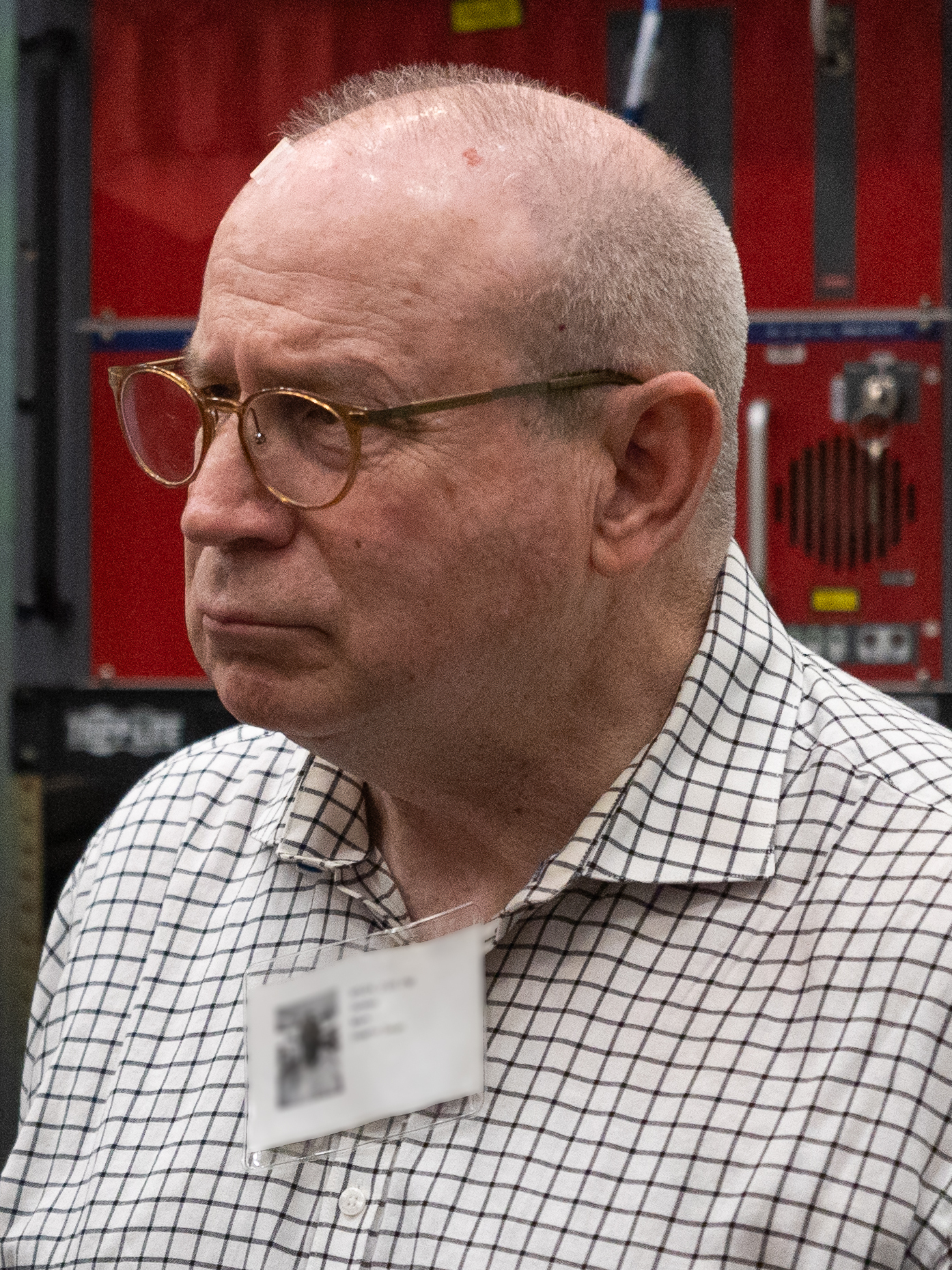

Candidate	Mark Sickles	Naomi Mesfin
Party	Democratic	Republican
Popular vote	25,761	7,406
Percentage	77.46%	22.27%
State delegate before election
Mark Sickles
Democratic
State delegate after election
Mark Sickles
Democratic

House District 17 contains portions of Fairfax County. Incumbent delegate is Democrat Mark Sickles, who was first elected in 2003.

=== Democratic primary ===
==== Nominee ====
- Mark Sickles, incumbent

=== Republican primary ===
==== Nominee ====
- Naomi Mesfin

=== General election ===
==== Endorsements ====
Mark Sickles (D)

Organizations

- LGBTQ+ Victory Fund

Predictions

Source	Ranking	As of
State Navigate	Solid D	August 15, 2025

==== Results ====
2025 Virginia 17th House of Delegates District general election
Party	Candidate	Votes	%
Democratic	Mark Sickles (incumbent)	25,761	77.46%
Republican	Naomi Mesfin	7,406	22.27%
Write-in		90	0.27%
Total votes		33,257	100.00%
Democratic hold			

== District 18 ==
2025 Virginia House of Delegates District 18 election
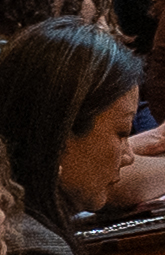

Candidate	Kathy Tran	Edward McGovern
Party	Democratic	Republican
Popular vote	24,582	9,387
Percentage	72.22%	27.58%
State delegate before election
Kathy Tran
Democratic
State delegate after election
Kathy Tran
Democratic

House District 18 contains portions of Fairfax County. Incumbent delegate is Democrat Kathy Tran, who was first elected in 2017.

=== Democratic primary ===
==== Nominee ====
- Kathy Tran, incumbent

=== Republican primary ===
==== Nominee ====
- Edward McGovern, retired Department of the Army employee and perennial candidate

=== General election ===
==== Predictions ====
Source	Ranking	As of
State Navigate	Solid D	August 15, 2025

==== Results ====
2025 Virginia 18th House of Delegates District general election
Party	Candidate	Votes	%
Democratic	Kathy Tran (incumbent)	24,582	72.22%
Republican	Edward McGovern	9,387	27.58%
Write-in		68	0.20%
Total votes		34,037	100.00%
Democratic hold			

== District 19 ==
2025 Virginia House of Delegates District 19 election
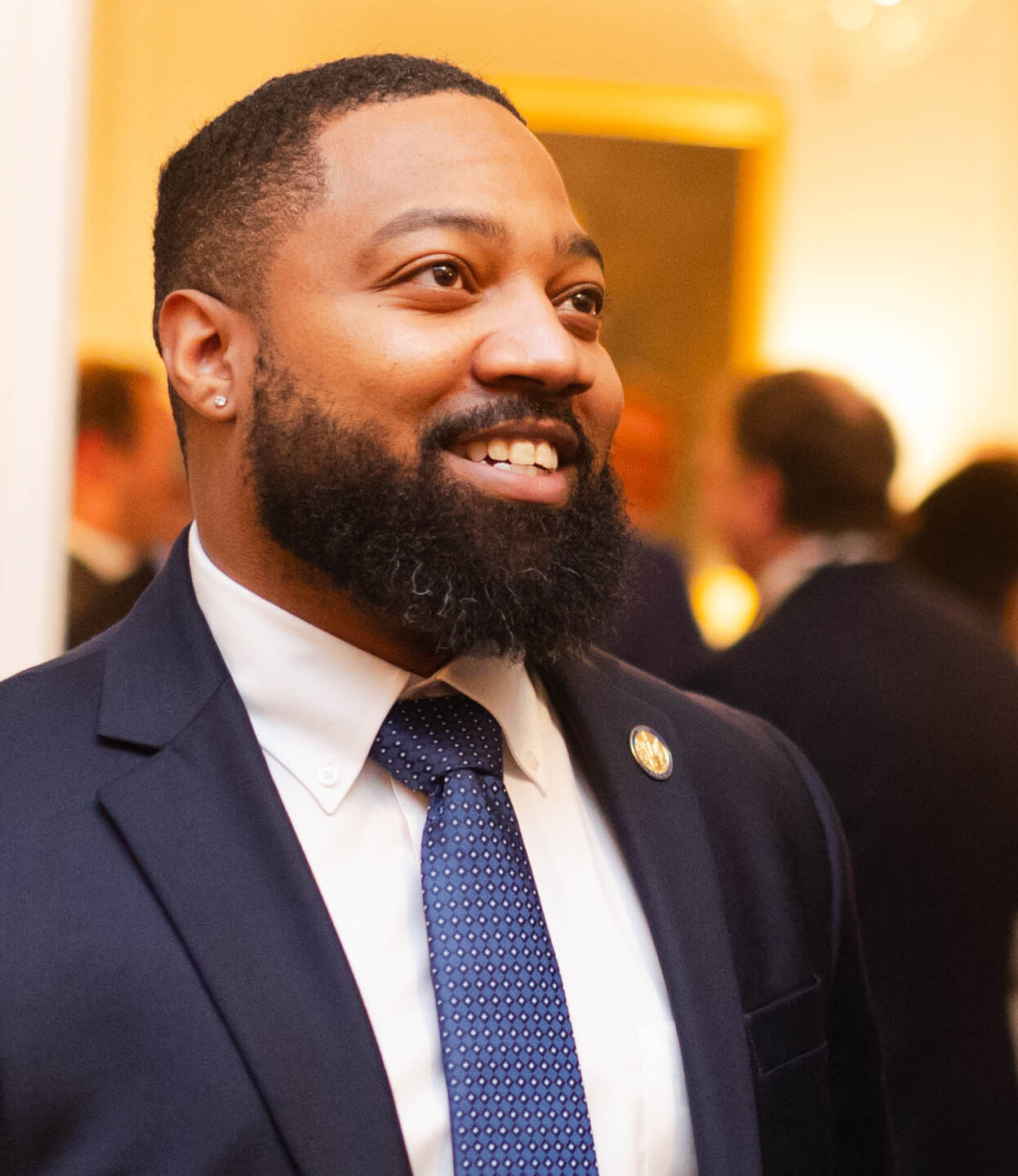
Candidate	Rozia Henson
Party	Democratic
Popular vote	17,248
Percentage	92.39%
State delegate before election
Rozia Henson
Democratic
State delegate after election
Rozia Henson
Democratic

House District 19 contains portions of Fairfax County and Prince William County. Incumbent delegate is Democrat Rozia Henson, who was first elected in 2023.

=== Democratic primary ===
==== Nominee ====
- Rozia Henson, incumbent

=== General election ===
==== Endorsements ====
Rozia Henson (D)

Organizations

- LGBTQ+ Victory Fund

Predictions

Source	Ranking	As of
State Navigate	Solid D	August 15, 2025

==== Results ====
2025 Virginia 19th House of Delegates District general election
Party	Candidate	Votes	%
Democratic	Rozia Henson (incumbent)	17,248	92.39%
Write-in		1,421	7.61%
Total votes		18,669	100.00%
Democratic hold			

== District 20 ==
2025 Virginia House of Delegates District 20 election
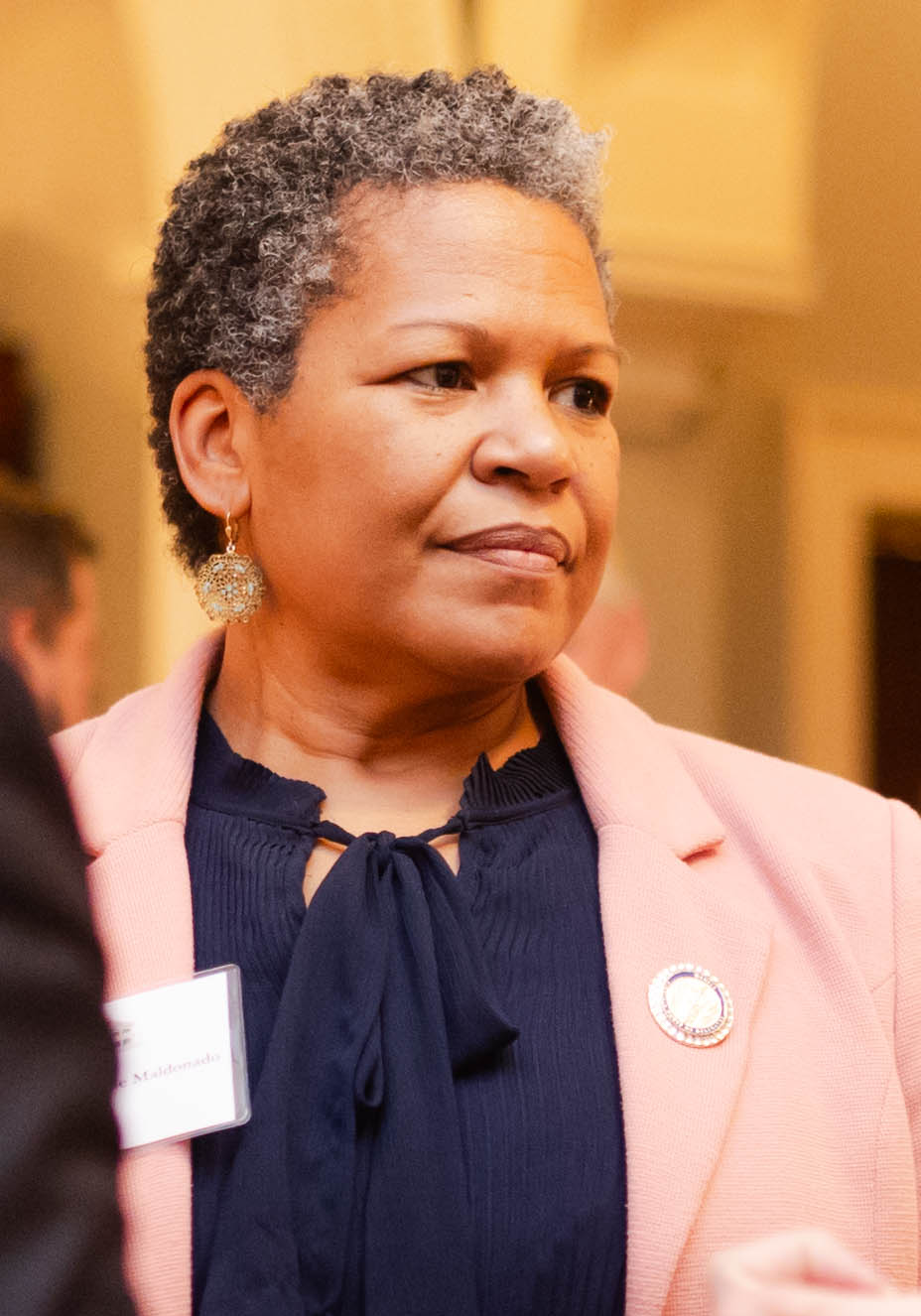

Candidate	Michelle Maldonado	Christopher Stone (withdrawn)
Party	Democratic	Republican
Popular vote	14,118	4,925
Percentage	68.08%	23.75%
State delegate before election
Michelle Maldonado
Democratic
State delegate after election
Michelle Maldonado
Democratic

House District 20 contains all of the cities of Manassas and Manassas Park, as well as portions of Prince William County. Incumbent delegate is Democrat Michelle Maldonado, who was first elected in 2021.

=== Democratic primary ===
==== Nominee ====
- Michelle Maldonado, incumbent

=== Republican primary ===
Christopher Stone advanced from the Republican primary unopposed and will appear on the general election ballot, however in September 2025 he announced he would be withdrawing from the race after taking a job out of state.

==== Withdrawn ====
- Christopher Stone, U.S. Air Force veteran and nominee for the 13th District in 2021 (will remain on ballot)

=== General election ===
Predictions

Source	Ranking	As of
State Navigate	Solid D	August 15, 2025

==== Results ====
2025 Virginia 20th House of Delegates District general election
Party	Candidate	Votes	%
Democratic	Michelle Maldonado (incumbent)	14,118	68.08%
Republican	Christopher Stone (withdrawn)	4,925	23.75%
Write-in		1,695	8.17%
Total votes		20,738	100.00%
Democratic hold			

== District 21 ==
2025 Virginia House of Delegates District 21 election
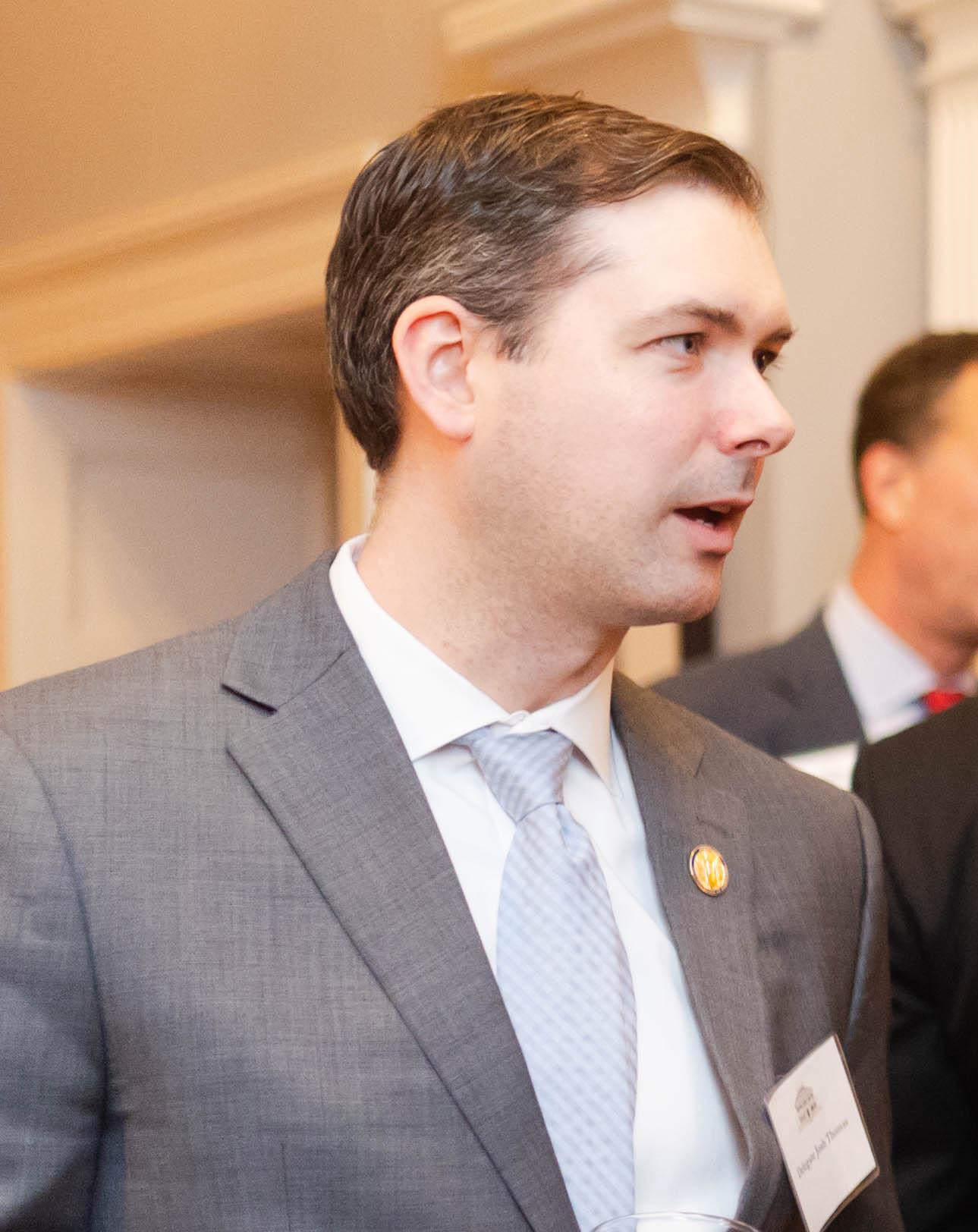

Candidate	Josh Thomas	Greg Gorham
Party	Democratic	Republican
Popular vote	18,386	13,017
Percentage	58.45%	41.38%
State delegate before election
Josh Thomas
Democratic
State delegate after election
Josh Thomas
Democratic

House District 21 contains portions of Prince William County. Incumbent delegate is Democrat Josh Thomas, who was first elected in 2023.

=== Democratic primary ===
==== Nominee ====
- Josh Thomas, incumbent

=== Republican primary ===
==== Nominee ====
- Greg Gorham, businessman

==== Eliminated in primary ====
- Xanthe Larsen, attorney
- Sahar Smith, U.S. Army vetera

==== Results ====
2025 Virginia's 21st House of Delegates district Republican primary
Party	Candidate	Votes	%
Republican	Greg Gorham	970	66.35%
Republican	Sahar Smith	395	27.02%
Republican	Xanthe Larsen	97	6.63%
Total votes		1,462	100.00%

=== General election ===
Predictions

Source	Ranking	As of
State Navigate	Likely D	August 15, 2025

==== Results ====
2025 Virginia 21st House of Delegates District general election
Party	Candidate	Votes	%
Democratic	Josh Thomas (incumbent)	18,386	58.45%
Republican	Greg Gorham	13,017	41.38%
Write-in		51	0.16%
Total votes		31,454	100.00%
Democratic hold			

== District 22 ==
2025 Virginia House of Delegates District 22 election
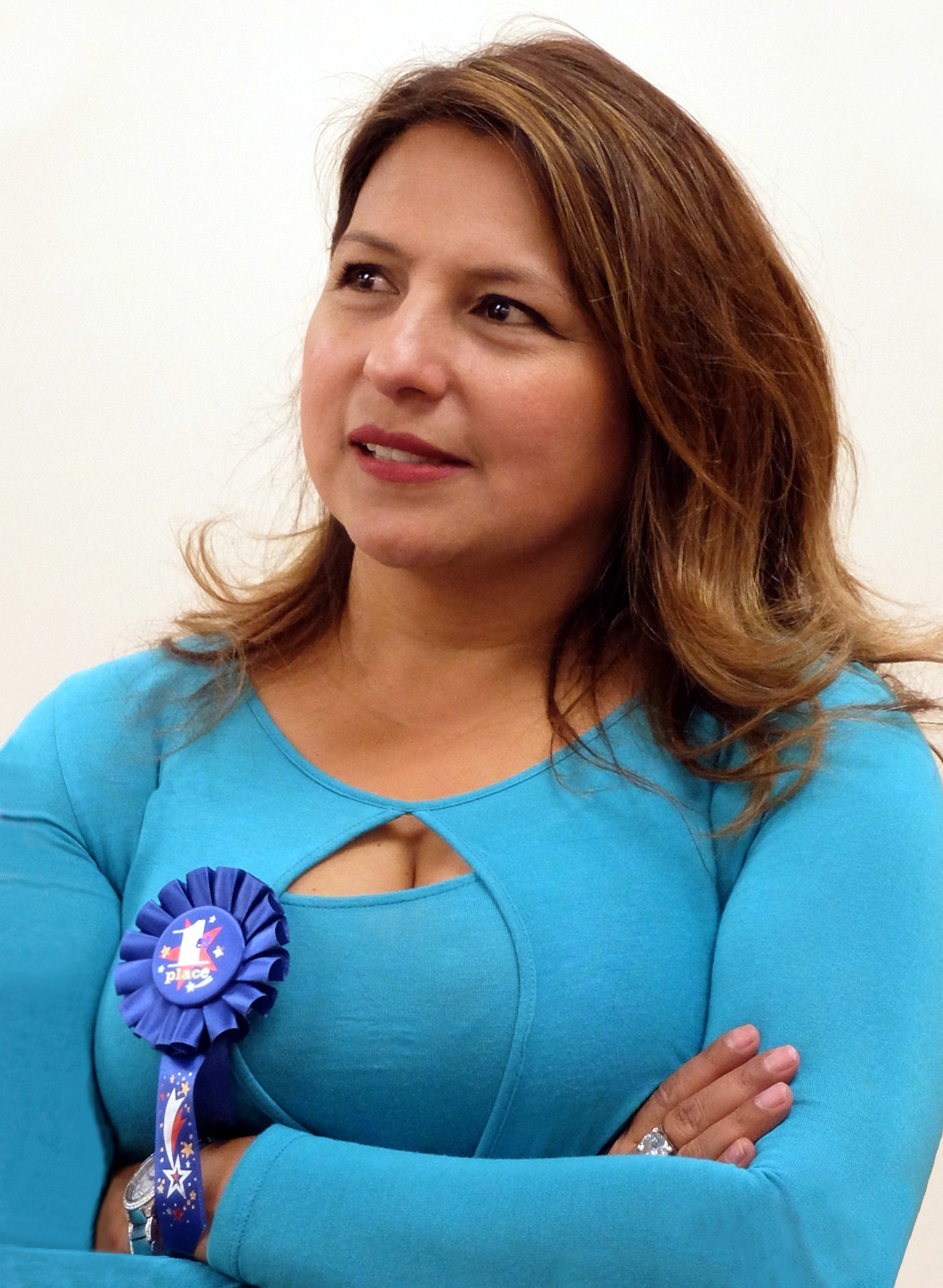

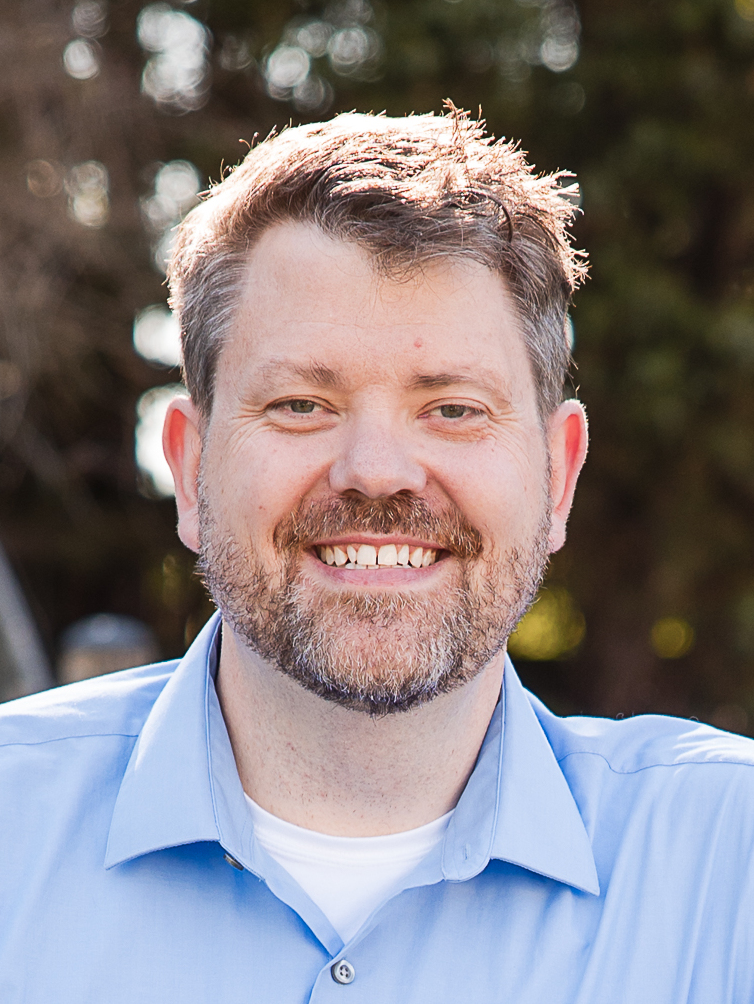
Candidate	Elizabeth Guzmán	Ian Lovejoy
Party	Democratic	Republican
Popular vote	20,297	16,624
Percentage	54.89%	44.96%
State delegate before election
Ian Lovejoy
Republican
State delegate after election
Elizabeth Guzmán
Democratic

House District 22 contains portions of Prince William County. Incumbent delegate is Republican Ian Lovejoy, who was first elected in 2023. The district is one of seven Republican-held districts won by Democratic Vice President Kamala Harris in the 2024 United States presidential election.

=== Republican primary ===
==== Nominee ====
- Ian Lovejoy, incumbent

=== Democratic primary ===
==== Nominee ====
- Elizabeth Guzmán, former state delegate for HD-31 (2018–2024), candidate for SD-29 in 2023, and candidate for VA-7 in 2024

=== General election ===
==== Endorsements ====
Ian Lovejoy (R)

Organizations

- Americans for Prosperity
Elizabeth Guzmán (D)

Organizations

- EMILYs List

Predictions

Source	Ranking	As of
State Navigate	Lean D (flip)	August 15, 2025

==== Results ====
2025 Virginia 22nd House of Delegates District general election
Party	Candidate	Votes	%
Democratic	Elizabeth Guzmán	20,297	54.89%
Republican	Ian Lovejoy (incumbent)	16,624	44.96%
Write-in		56	0.15%
Total votes		36,977	100.00%
Democratic gain from Republican			

== District 23 ==
2025 Virginia House of Delegates District 23 election
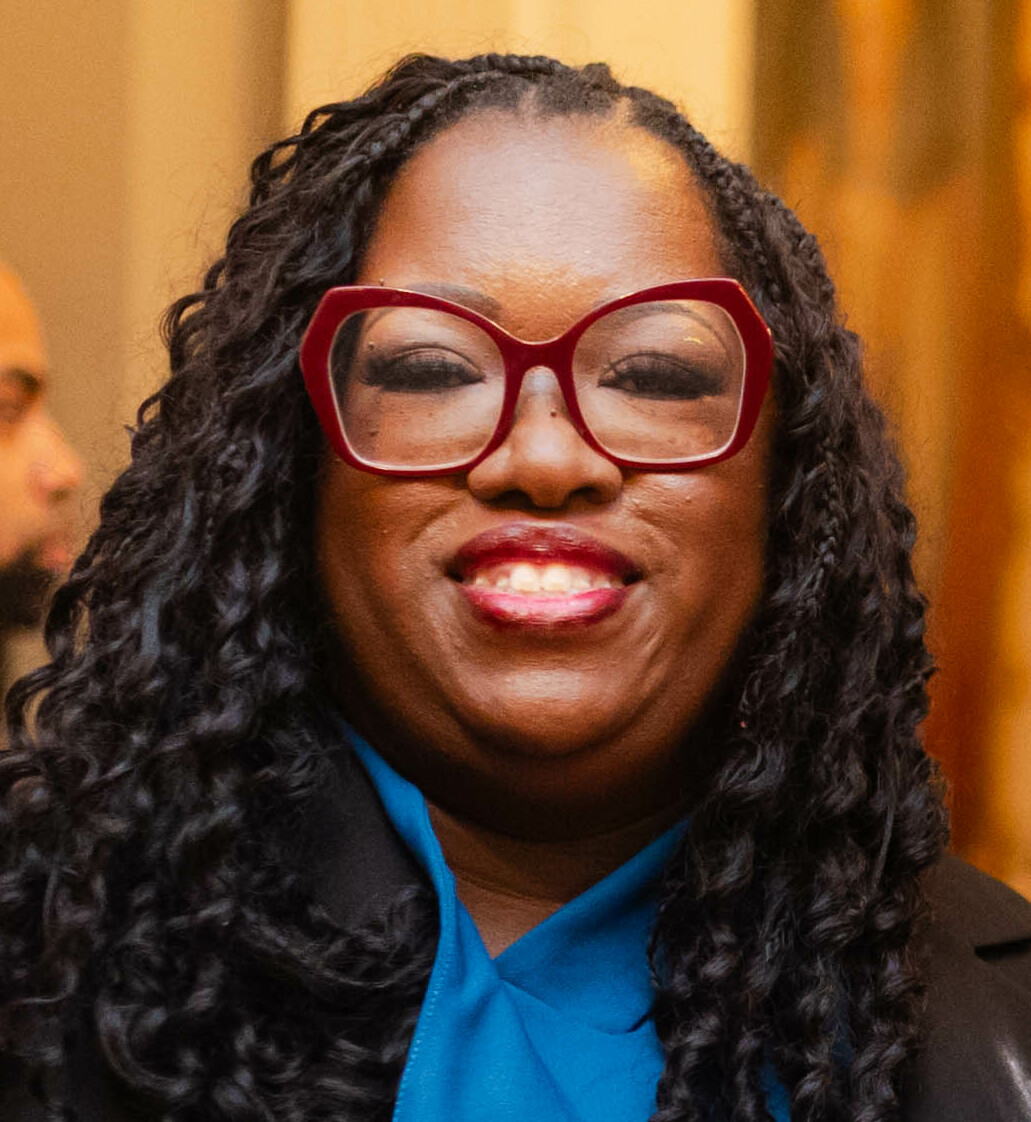

Candidate	Candi King	James Tully
Party	Democratic	Republican
Popular vote	18,329	5,683
Percentage	76.13%	23.60%
State delegate before election
Candi King
Democratic
State delegate after election
Candi King
Democratic

House District 23 contains portions of Prince William County and Stafford County. Incumbent delegate is Democrat Candi King, who was first elected in 2021.

=== Democratic primary ===
==== Nominee ====
- Candi King, incumbent

=== Republican primary ===
==== Nominee ====
- James Tully, retired deputy and nominee for this seat in 2023

=== General election ===
Predictions

Source	Ranking	As of
State Navigate	Solid D	August 15, 2025

==== Results ====
2025 Virginia 23rd House of Delegates District general election
Party	Candidate	Votes	%
Democratic	Candi King (incumbent)	18,329	76.13%
Republican	James Tully	5,683	23.60%
Write-in		65	0.27%
Total votes		24,077	100.00%
Democratic hold			

== District 24 ==
2025 Virginia House of Delegates District 24 election
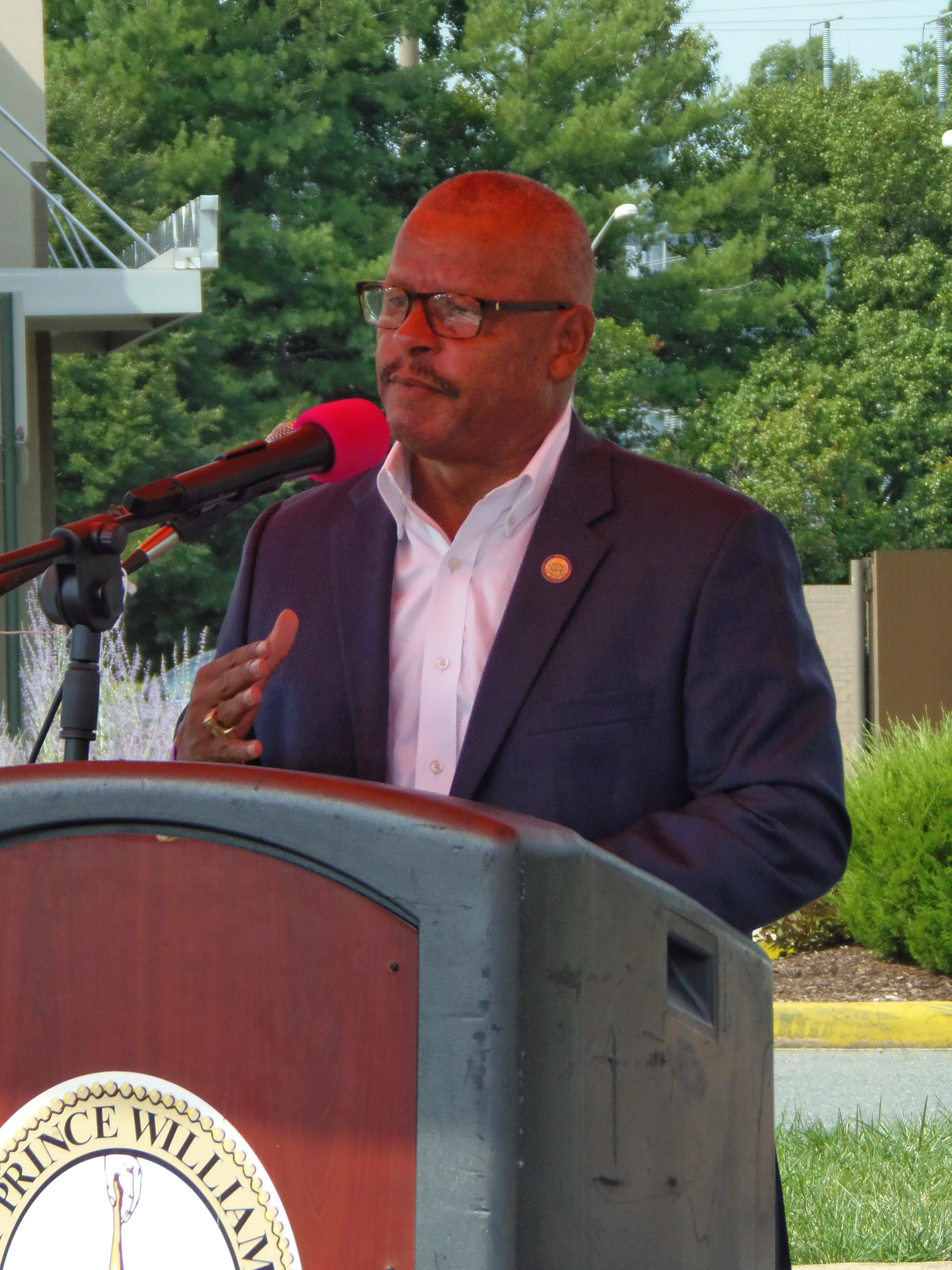
Candidate	Luke Torian
Party	Democratic
Popular vote	22,647
Percentage	91.02%
State delegate before election
Luke Torian
Democratic
State delegate after election
Luke Torian
Democratic

House District 24 contains portions of Prince William County. Incumbent delegate is Democrat Luke Torian, who was first elected in 2009.

=== Democratic primary ===
==== Nominee ====
- Luke Torian, incumbent

=== General election ===
Predictions

Source	Ranking	As of
State Navigate	Solid D	August 15, 2025

==== Results ====
2025 Virginia 24th House of Delegates District general election
Party	Candidate	Votes	%
Democratic	Luke Torian (incumbent)	22,647	91.02%
Write-in		2,235	8.98%
Total votes		24,882	100.00%
Democratic hold			

== District 25 ==
2025 Virginia House of Delegates District 25 election
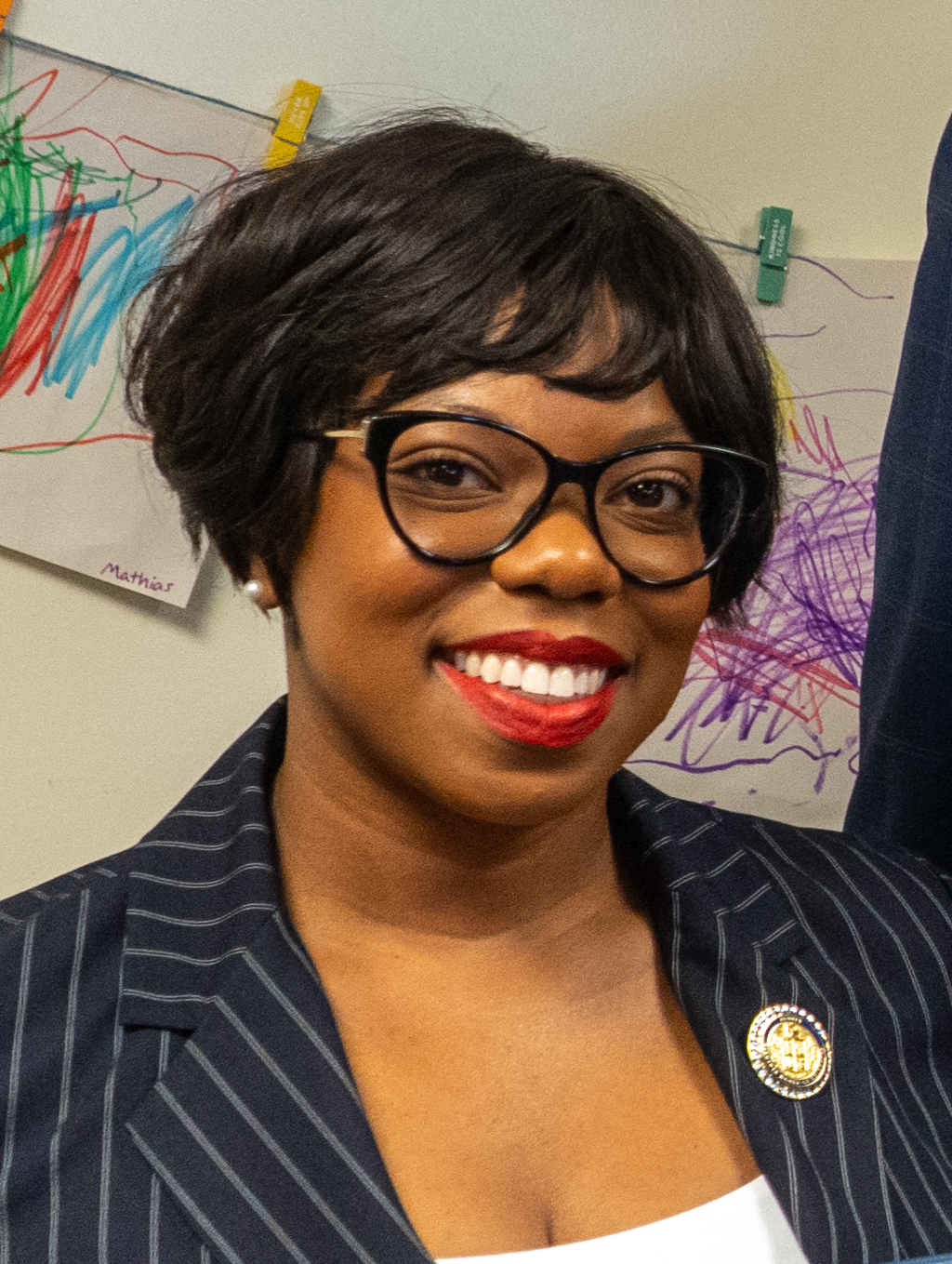
Candidate	Briana Sewell
Party	Democratic
Popular vote	23,472
Percentage	90.83%
State delegate before election
Briana Sewell
Democratic
State delegate after election
Briana Sewell
Democratic

House District 25 contains portions of Prince William County. Incumbent delegate is Democrat Briana Sewell, who was first elected in 2021.

=== Democratic primary ===
==== Nominee ====
- Briana Sewell, incumbent

=== General election ===
Predictions

Source	Ranking	As of
State Navigate	Solid D	August 15, 2025

==== Results ====
2025 Virginia 25th House of Delegates District general election
Party	Candidate	Votes	%
Democratic	Briana Sewell (incumbent)	23,472	90.83%
Write-in		2,369	9.17%
Total votes		25,841	100.00%
Democratic hold			

== District 26 ==
2025 Virginia House of Delegates District 26 election
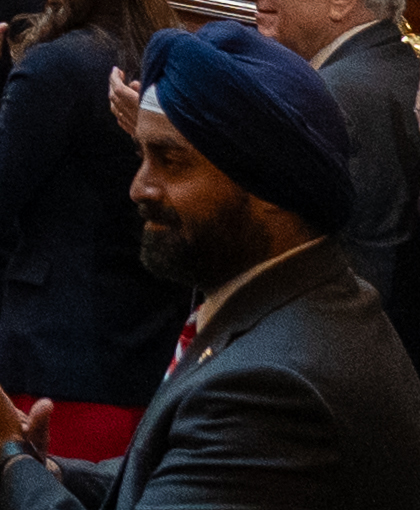

Candidate	JJ Singh	Ommair Butt
Party	Democratic	Republican
Popular vote	20,430	8,942
Percentage	69.36%	30.36%
State delegate before election
JJ Singh
Democratic
State delegate after election
JJ Singh
Democratic

House District 26 contains portions of Loudoun County. Incumbent delegate is Democrat JJ Singh, who was first elected in 2025.

=== Democratic primary ===
==== Nominee ====
- JJ Singh, incumbent state delegate

=== Republican priamry ===
==== Nominee ====
- Ommair Butt, IT contractor and candidate for SD-32 special election in 2025

=== General election ===
Predictions

Source	Ranking	As of
State Navigate	Solid D	August 15, 2025

==== Results ====
2025 Virginia 26th House of Delegates District general election
Party	Candidate	Votes	%
Democratic	JJ Singh (incumbent)	20,430	69.36%
Republican	Ommair Butt	8,942	30.36%
Write-in		85	0.29%
Total votes		29,457	100.00%
Democratic hold			

== District 27 ==
2025 Virginia House of Delegates District 27 election
Candidate	Atoosa Reaser	Junaid Khan
Party	Democratic	Republican
Popular vote	18,506	9,706
Percentage	65.46%	34.33%
State delegate before election
Atoosa Reaser
Democratic
State delegate after election
Atoosa Reaser
Democratic

House District 27 contains portions of Loudoun County. Incumbent delegate is Democrat Atoosa Reaser, who was first elected in 2023.

=== Democratic primary ===
==== Nominee ====
- Atoosa Reaser, incumbent state delegate

=== Republican primary ===
==== Nominee ====
- Junaid Khan, cybersecurity professional

=== General election ===
Predictions

Source	Ranking	As of
State Navigate	Solid D	August 15, 2025

==== Results ====
2025 Virginia 23rd House of Delegates District general election
Party	Candidate	Votes	%
Democratic	Atoosa Reaser (incumbent)	18,506	65.46%
Republican	Junaid Khan	9,706	34.33%
Write-in		60	0.21%
Total votes		28,272	100.00%
Democratic hold			

== District 28 ==
2025 Virginia House of Delegates District 28 election
Candidate	David Reid	Janet Geisler
Party	Democratic	Republican
Popular vote	24,182	11,700
Percentage	67.26%	32.54%
State delegate before election
David Reid
Democratic
State delegate after election
David Reid
Democratic

House District 28 contains portions of Loudoun County. Incumbent delegate is Democrat David A. Reid, who was first elected in 2017

=== Democratic primary ===
==== Nominee ====
- David A. Reid, incumbent state delegate

=== Republican primary ===
==== Nominee ====
- Janet Geisler, voice actor

=== General election ===
Predictions

Source	Ranking	As of
State Navigate	Solid D	August 15, 2025

==== Results ====
2025 Virginia 28th House of Delegates District general election
Party	Candidate	Votes	%
Democratic	David A. Reid (incumbent)	24,182	67.26%
Republican	Janet Geisler	11,700	32.54%
Write-in		72	0.20%
Total votes		35,954	100.00%
Democratic hold			

== District 29 ==
2025 Virginia House of Delegates District 29 election
Candidate	Marty Martinez	Scott Thomas
Party	Democratic	Republican
Popular vote	22,350	13,138
Percentage	62.84%	36.94%
State delegate before election
Marty Martinez
Democratic
State delegate after election
Marty Martinez
Democratic

House District 29 contains portions of Loudoun County. Incumbent delegate is Democrat Marty Martinez, who was first elected in 2023.

=== Democratic primary ===
==== Nominee ====
- Marty Martinez, incumbent state delegate

=== Republican primary ===
==== Nominee ====
- Scott Thomas, U.S. Army veteran

=== General election ===
Predictions

Source	Ranking	As of
State Navigate	Solid D	August 15, 2025

==== Results ====
2025 Virginia 29th House of Delegates District general election
Party	Candidate	Votes	%
Democratic	Marty Martinez (incumbent)	22,350	62.84%
Republican	Scott Thomas	13,138	36.94%
Write-in		77	0.22%
Total votes		35,565	100.00%
Democratic hold			

== District 30 ==
2025 Virginia House of Delegates District 30 election

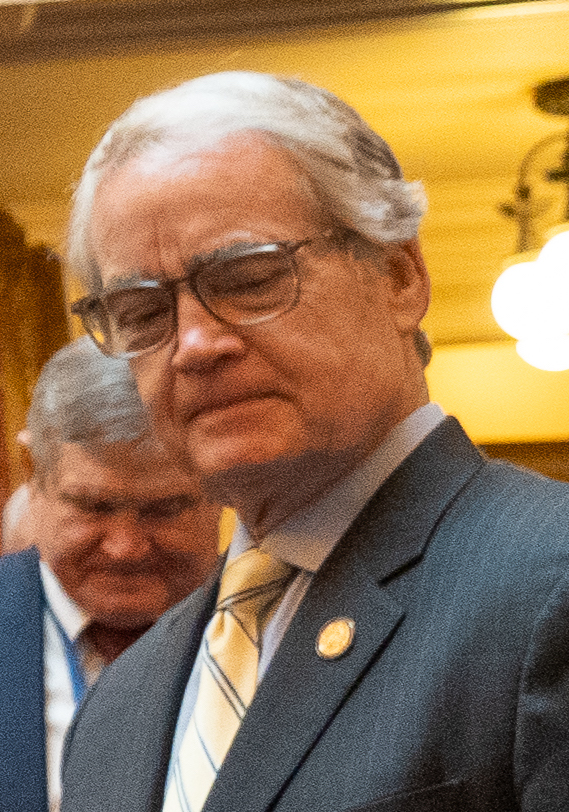
Candidate	John McAuliff	Geary Higgins
Party	Democratic	Republican
Popular vote	22,393	21,544
Percentage	50.89%	48.96%
State delegate before election
Geary Higgins
Republican
State delegate after election
John McAuliff
Democratic

House District 30 contains portions of Fauquier County and Loudoun County. Incumbent delegate is Republican Geary Higgins, who was first elected in 2023.

=== Republican primary ===
==== Nominee ====
- Geary Higgins, incumbent

=== Democratic primary ===
==== Nominee ====
- John McAuliff, former Senior Climate Policy Advisor at the USDA and former Chief of Staff to Del. David Reid

=== General election ===
Predictions

Source	Ranking	As of
State Navigate	Tilt D (flip)	November 3, 2025

==== Results ====
2025 Virginia 30th House of Delegates District general election
Party	Candidate	Votes	%
Democratic	John McAuliff	22,393	50.89%
Republican	Geary Higgins (incumbent)	21,544	48.96%
Write-in		70	0.16%
Total votes		44,007	100.00%
Democratic gain from Republican			

== District 31 ==
2025 Virginia House of Delegates District 31 election
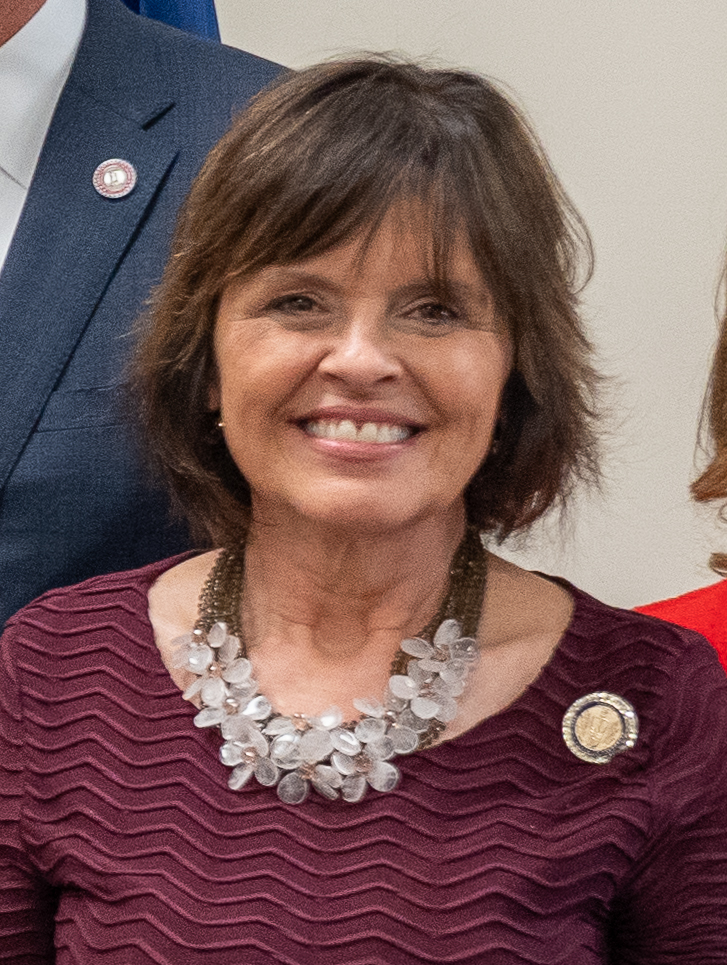

Candidate	Delores Riley Oates	Shane Boswell
Party	Republican	Democratic
Popular vote	22,550	15,130
Percentage	59.76%	40.10%
State delegate before election
Delores Riley Oates
Republican
State delegate after election
Delores Riley Oates
Republican

House District 31 contains all of Clarke County and portions of Frederick County and Warren County. Incumbent delegate is Republican Delores Riley Oates, who was first elected in 2023.

=== Republican primary ===
==== Nominee ====
- Delores Riley Oates, incumbent

=== Democratic primary ===
==== Nominee ====
- Shane Boswell, former U.S. Navy chief petty officer

=== General election ===
Predictions

Source	Ranking	As of
State Navigate	Solid R	August 15, 2025

==== Results ====
2025 Virginia 31st House of Delegates District general election
Party	Candidate	Votes	%
Republican	Delores Riley Oates (incumbent)	22,550	59.76%
Democratic	Shane Boswell	15,130	40.10%
Write-in		55	0.15%
Total votes		37,735	100.00%
Republican hold			

== District 32 ==
2025 Virginia House of Delegates District 32 election
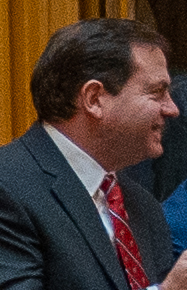

Candidate	Bill Wiley	Jon Lucci
Party	Republican	Democratic
Popular vote	18,733	13,535
Percentage	57.99%	41.90%
State delegate before election
Bill Wiley
Republican
State delegate after election
Bill Wiley
Republican

House District 32 contains the entire city of Winchester and portions of Frederick County. Incumbent delegate is Republican Bill Wiley, who was first elected in 2020.

=== Republican primary ===
==== Nominee ====
- Bill Wiley, incumbent

=== Democratic primary ===
==== Nominee ====
- Jon Lucci, author and businessman

=== General election ===
Predictions

Source	Ranking	As of
State Navigate	Solid R	August 15, 2025

==== Results ====
2025 Virginia 32nd House of Delegates District general election
Party	Candidate	Votes	%
Republican	Bill Wiley (incumbent)	18,733	57.99%
Democratic	Jon Lucci	13,535	41.90%
Write-in		36	0.11%
Total votes		32,304	100.00%
Republican hold			

== District 33 ==
2025 Virginia House of Delegates District 33 election
Candidate	Justin Pence	Cathy Rec
Party	Republican	Democratic
Popular vote	25,885	9,300
Percentage	73.43%	26.38%
State delegate before election
Todd Gilbert
Republican
State delegate after election
Justin Pence
Republican

House District 33 contains all of Page County and Shenandoah County, as well as portions of Rockingham County and Warren County. The incumbent delegate was Republican Todd Gilbert, who was first elected in 2005; he resigned on July 14, 2025, to become interim U.S. attorney.

=== Republican primary ===
Gilbert was uncontested in the Republican primary. A committee of Republican county chairs selected a new nominee on July 29, 2025.

==== Nominee ====
- Justin Pence, COO of Bluepoint ATM Solutions

==== Considered but not chosen ====
- Keven Walker, CEO of the Shenandoah Valley Battlefields Foundation

==== Declared but not considered ====
- Ashleigh Kimmons, Vice-mayor of Strasburg
- Brad Pollack, former Shenandoah County supervisor, candidate for SD-1 in 2023, and disbarred attorney

==== Withdrawn ====
- Dewey Ritchie, Rockingham County supervisor

==== Declined ====
- Todd Gilbert, incumbent (appointed interim United States Attorney for the Western District of Virginia)

=== Democratic primary ===
==== Nominee ====
- Cathy Rec, Transcriptionist

=== General election ===
Predictions

Source	Ranking	As of
State Navigate	Solid R	August 15, 2025

==== Results ====
2025 Virginia 33rd House of Delegates District general election
Party	Candidate	Votes	%
Republican	Justin Pence	25,885	73.57%
Democratic	Cathy Rec	9,300	26.43%
Write-in		64	0.18%
Total votes		35,249	100.00%
Republican hold			

== District 34 ==
2025 Virginia House of Delegates District 34 election
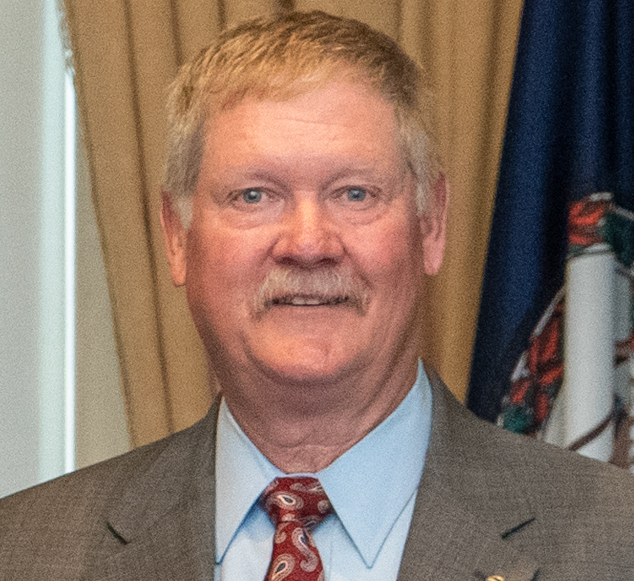

Candidate	Tony Wilt	Andrew Payton
Party	Republican	Democratic
Popular vote	14,592	14,335
Percentage	50.38%	49.49%
State delegate before election
Tony Wilt
Republican
State delegate after election
TBD

House District 34 contains the city of Harrisonburg and portions of Rockingham County. Incumbent delegate is Republican Tony Wilt, who was first elected in 2010.

=== Republican primary ===
==== Nominee ====
- Tony Wilt, incumbent

=== Democratic primary ===
==== Nominee ====
- Andrew Payton, learning designer and climate activist

=== General election ===
==== Endorsements ====
Tony Wilt (R)

Organizations

- Americans for Prosperity

Predictions

Source	Ranking	As of
State Navigate	Likely R	August 15, 2025

==== Results ====
2025 Virginia 34th House of Delegates District general election
Party	Candidate	Votes	%
Republican	Tony Wilt (incumbent)	14,592	50.38%
Democratic	Andrew Payton	14,335	49.49%
Write-in		36	0.12%
Total votes		28,963	100.00%

== District 35 ==
2025 Virginia House of Delegates District 35 election
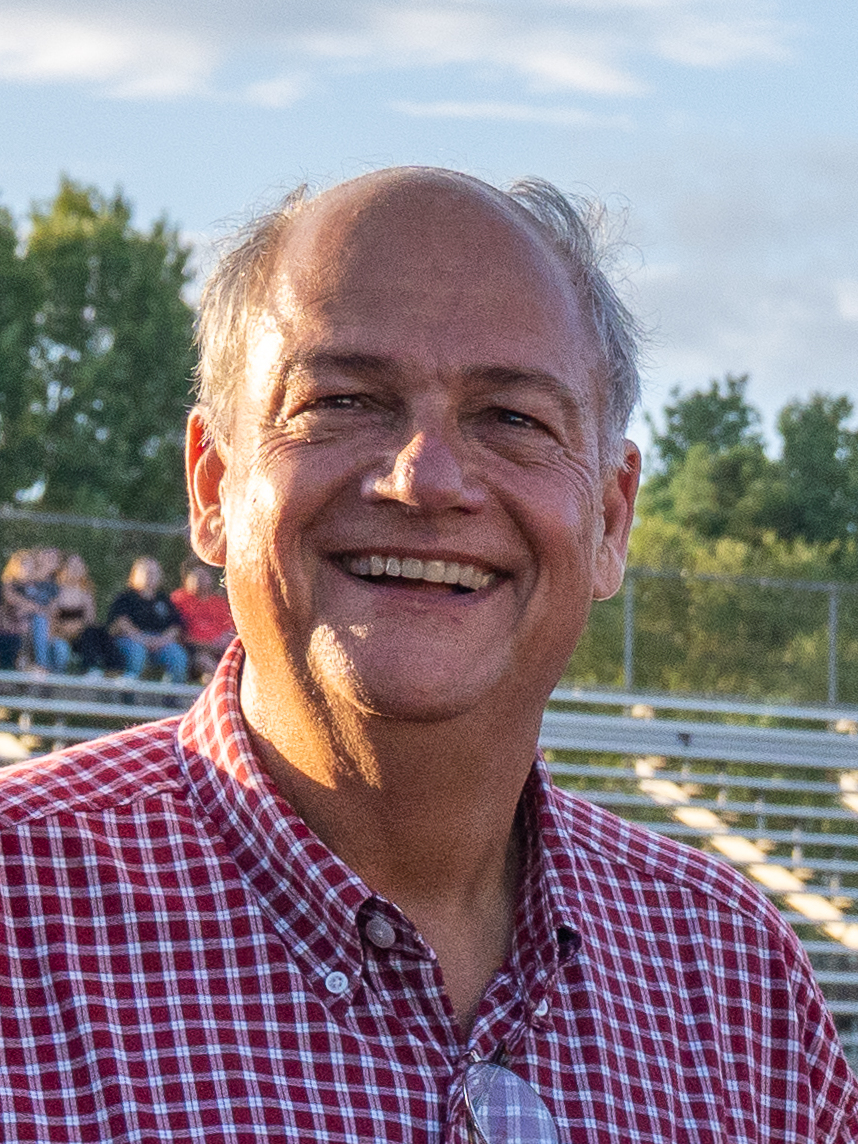

Candidate	Chris Runion	Jena Crisler
Party	Republican	Democratic
Popular vote	27,293	10,340
Percentage	72.41%	27.43%
State delegate before election
Chris Runion
Republican
State delegate after election
Chris Runion
Republican

House District 35 contains all of Bath County and Highland County, as well as portions of Augusta County and Rockingham County. Incumbent delegate is Republican Chris Runion, who was first elected in 2019.

=== Republican primary ===
==== Nominee ====
- Chris Runion, incumbent

=== Democratic primary ===
==== Nominee ====
- Jena Crisler, internal medicine physician

=== General election ===
Predictions

Source	Ranking	As of
State Navigate	Solid R	August 15, 2025

==== Results ====
2025 Virginia 35th House of Delegates District general election
Party	Candidate	Votes	%
Republican	Chris Runion (incumbent)	27,293	72.41%
Democratic	Jena Crisler	10,340	27.43%
Write-in		59	0.16%
Total votes		37,692	100.00%
Republican hold			

== District 36 ==
2025 Virginia House of Delegates District 36 election
Candidate	Ellen Campbell	Makayla Venable
Party	Republican	Democratic
Popular vote	20,945	15,352
Percentage	57.64%	42.25%
State delegate before election
Ellen Campbell
Republican
State delegate after election
Ellen Campbell
Republican

House District 36 contains the cities of Staunton and Waynesboro, as well as portions of Augusta County and Rockbridge County. Incumbent delegate is Republican Ellen Campbell, who was first elected in 2023.

=== Republican primary ===
==== Nominee ====
- Ellen Campbell, incumbent state delegate

=== Democratic primary ===
==== Nominee ====
- Makayla Venable, community healthcare worker and activist

=== General election ===
Predictions

Source	Ranking	As of
State Navigate	Solid R	August 15, 2025

==== Results ====
2025 Virginia 36th House of Delegates District general election
Party	Candidate	Votes	%
Republican	Ellen Campbell (incumbent)	20,945	57.64%
Democratic	Makayla Venable	15,352	42.25%
Write-in		41	0.11%
Total votes		36,338	100.00%
Republican hold			

== District 37 ==
2025 Virginia House of Delegates District 37 election
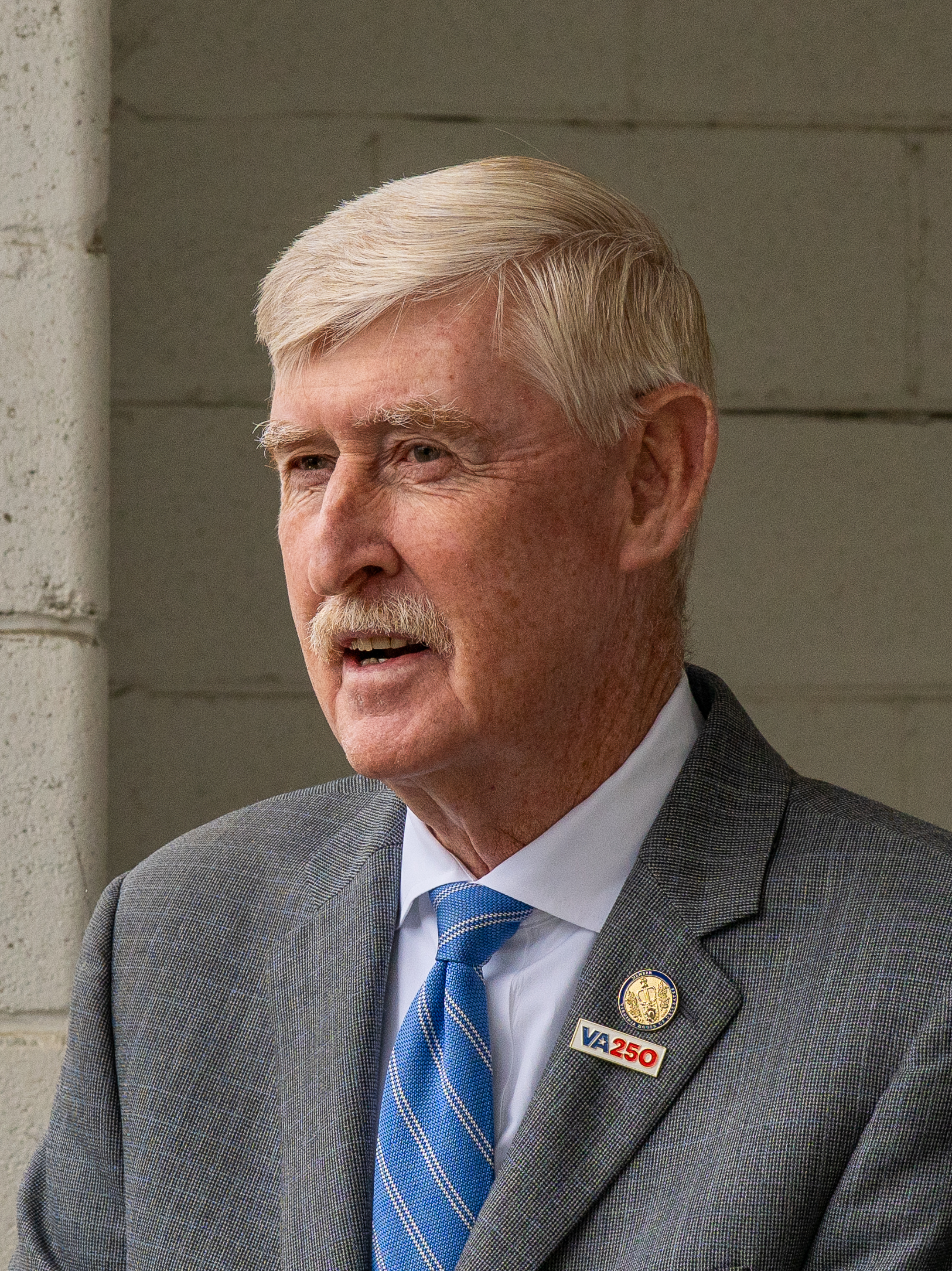

Candidate	Terry Austin	Andrew Hartless
Party	Republican	Democratic
Popular vote	25,540	10,894
Percentage	69.79%	29.77%
State delegate before election
Terry Austin
Republican
State delegate after election
Terry Austin
Republican

House District 37 contains the cities of Buena Vista, Covington, and Lexington, as well as all of Alleghany County, Botetourt County, and Craig County, and portions of Rockbridge County. Incumbent delegate is Republican Terry Austin, who was first elected in 2013.

=== Republican primary ===
==== Nominee ====
- Terry Austin, incumbent

==== Eliminated in primary ====
- Austen Schwend, businessman

==== Results ====
2025 Virginia's 37th House of Delegates district Republican primary
Party	Candidate	Votes	%
Republican	Terry Austin (incumbent)	4,399	67.94%
Republican	Austen Schwend	2,076	32.06%
Total votes		6,475	100.00%

=== Democratic primary ===
==== Nominee ====
- Andrew Hartless,

=== General election ===
Predictions

Source	Ranking	As of
State Navigate	Solid R	August 15, 2025

==== Results ====
2025 Virginia 37th House of Delegates District general election
Party	Candidate	Votes	%
Republican	Terry Austin (incumbent)	25,540	69.79%
Democratic	Andrew Hartless	10,894	29.77%
Write-in		163	0.45%
Total votes		36,597	100.00%
Republican hold			

== District 38 ==
2025 Virginia House of Delegates District 38 election
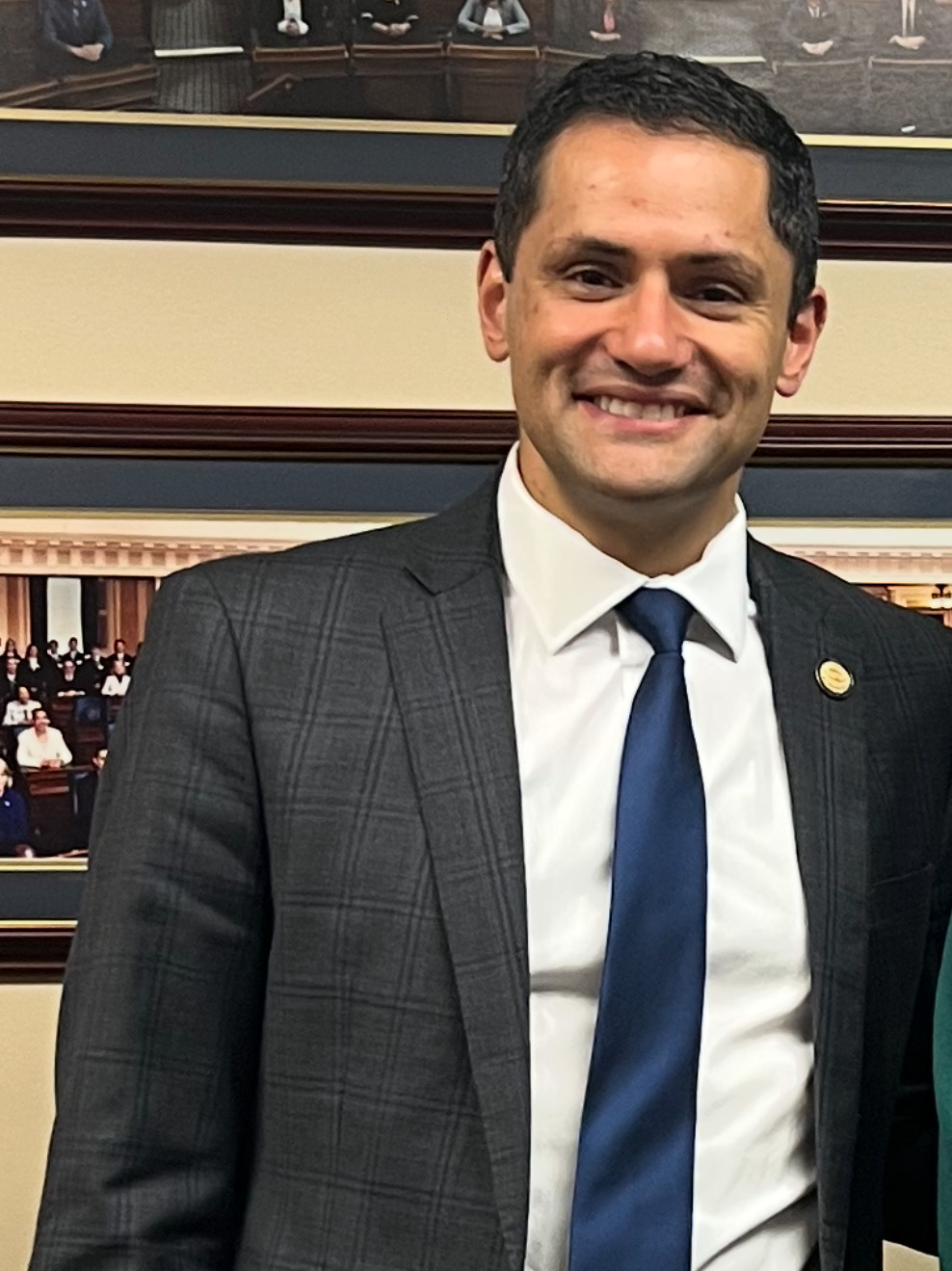

Candidate	Sam Rasoul	Maynard Keller Jr.
Party	Democratic	Independent
Popular vote	17,121	7,332
Percentage	69.79%	29.89%
State delegate before election
Sam Rasoul
Democratic
State delegate after election
Sam Rasoul
Democratic

House District 38 contains portions of the city of Roanoke. Incumbent delegate is Democrat Sam Rasoul, who was first elected in 2013.

=== Democratic primary ===
==== Nominee ====
- Sam Rasoul, incumbent

=== Independents ===
==== Declared ====
- Maynard Keller Jr., financial planner and candidate for Roanoke City Council in 2022

=== General election ===
Predictions

Source	Ranking	As of
State Navigate	Solid D	August 15, 2025

==== Results ====
2025 Virginia 38th House of Delegates District general election
Party	Candidate	Votes	%
Democratic	Sam Rasoul (incumbent)	17,121	69.79%
Independent	Maynard Keller Jr	7,332	29.89%
Write-in		78	0.32%
Total votes		24,531	100.00%
Democratic hold			

== District 39 ==
2025 Virginia House of Delegates District 39 election
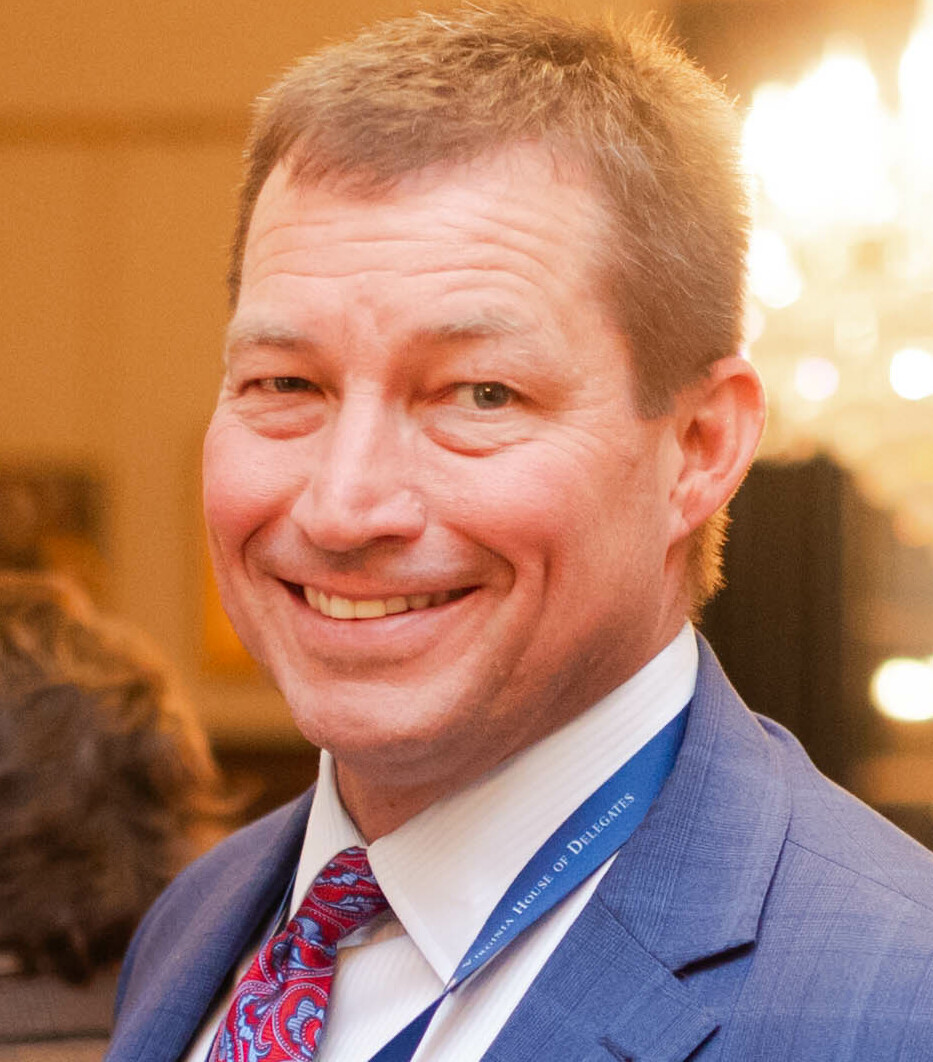

Candidate	Will Davis	Eric Klotz
Party	Republican	Democratic
Popular vote	25,624	10,283
Percentage	71.26%	28.60%
State delegate before election
Will Davis
Republican
State delegate after election
Will Davis
Republican

House District 39 contains all of Franklin County and portions of Roanoke County. Incumbent delegate is Republican Will Davis, who was first elected in 2023.

=== Republican primary ===
==== Nominee ====
- Will Davis, incumbent

=== Democratic primary ===
==== Nominee ====
- Eric Klotz, U.S. Navy veteran

=== General election ===
Predictions

Source	Ranking	As of
State Navigate	Solid R	August 15, 2025

==== Results ====
2025 Virginia 39th House of Delegates District general election
Party	Candidate	Votes	%
Republican	Will Davis (incumbent)	25,624	71.26%
Democratic	Eric Klotz	10,283	28.60%
Write-in		52	0.14%
Total votes		35,959	100.00%
Republican hold			

== District 40 ==
2025 Virginia House of Delegates District 40 election
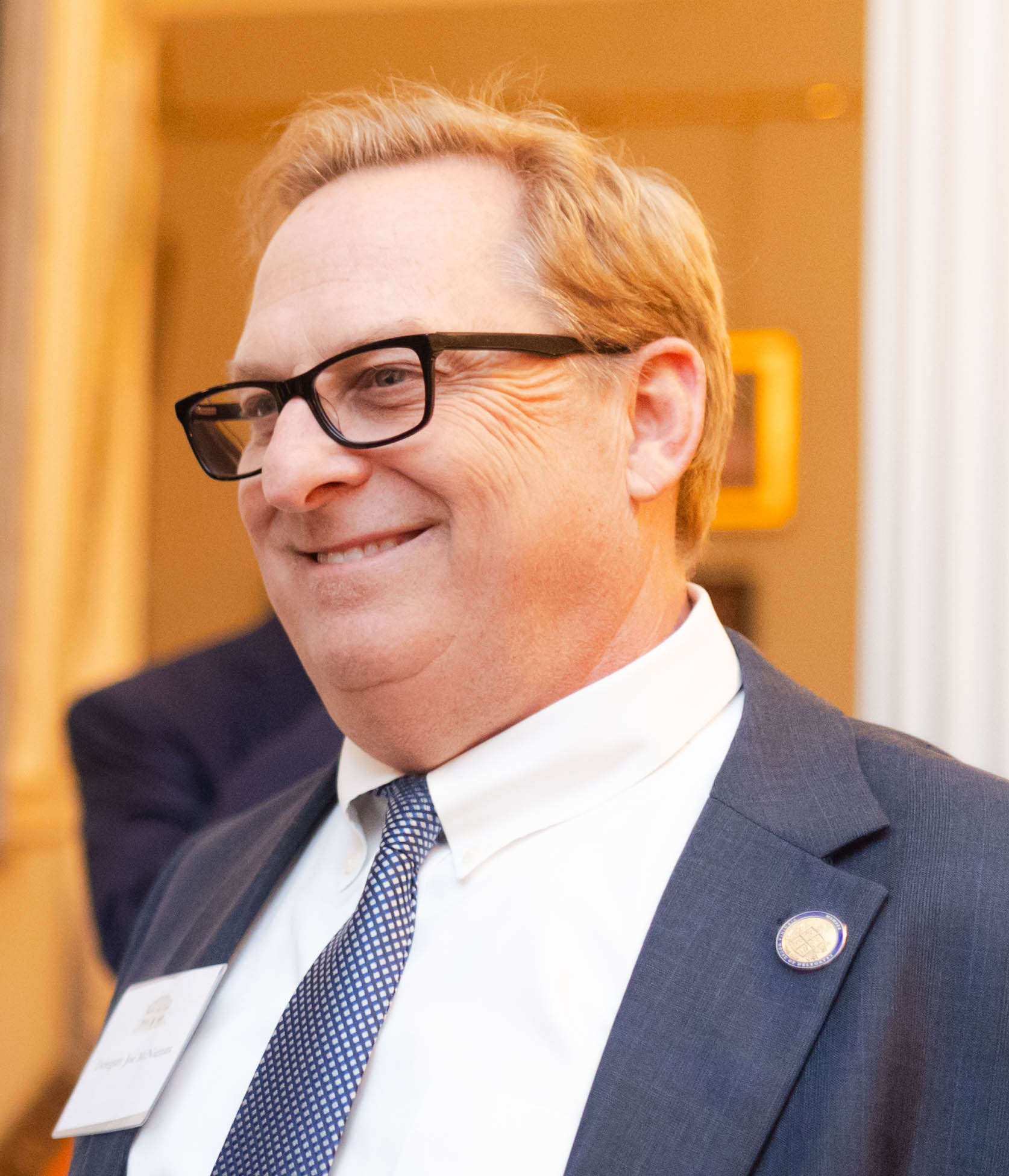

Candidate	Joe McNamara	Donna Littlepage
Party	Republican	Democratic
Popular vote	19,255	17,101
Percentage	52.86%	46.95%
State delegate before election
Joe McNamara
Republican
State delegate after election
Joe McNamara
Republican

House District 40 contains the entire city of Salem, portions of the city of Roanoke, and portions of Roanoke County. Incumbent delegate is Republican Joe McNamara, who was first elected in 2018.

=== Republican primary ===
==== Nominee ====
- Joe McNamara, incumbent

=== Democratic primary ===
==== Nominee ====
- Donna Littlepage, former Senior Vice President of the Carilion Clinic

==== Eliminated in primary ====
- Kiesha Preston, domestic violence activist

==== Results ====
2025 Virginia's 40th House of Delegates district Democratic primary
Party	Candidate	Votes	%
Democratic	Donna Littlepage	2,544	63.28%
Democratic	Kiesha Preston	1,476	36.72%
Total votes		4,020	100.00%

=== General election ===
Predictions

Source	Ranking	As of
State Navigate	Likely R	August 31, 2025

==== Results ====
2025 Virginia 40th House of Delegates District general election
Party	Candidate	Votes	%
Republican	Joe McNamara (incumbent)	19,255	52.86%
Democratic	Donna Littlepage	17,101	46.95%
Write-in		69	0.19%
Total votes		36,425	100.00%
Republican hold			

== District 41 ==
2025 Virginia House of Delegates District 41 election

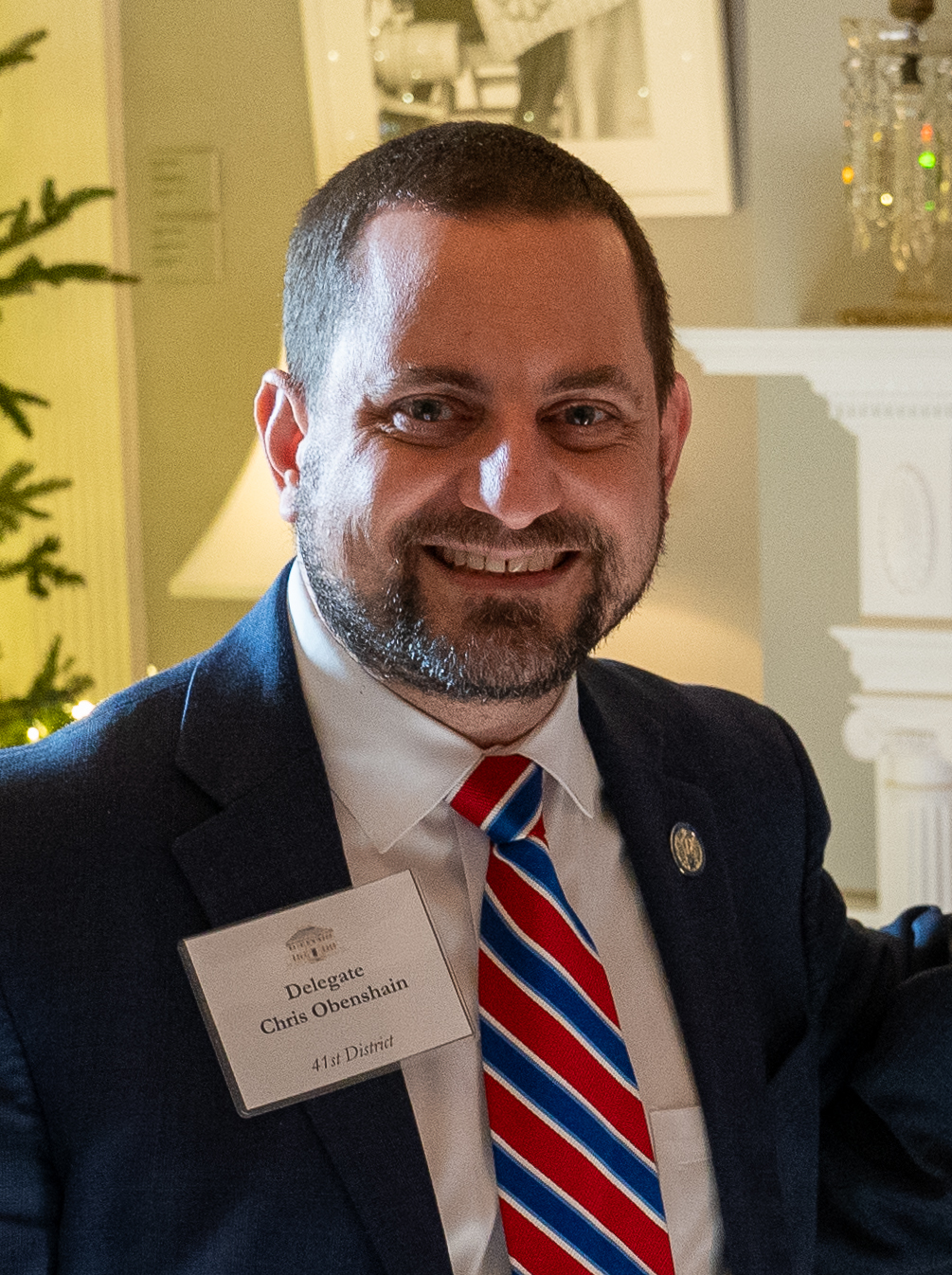
Candidate	Lily Franklin	Chris Obenshain
Party	Democratic	Republican
Popular vote	17,683	15,460
Percentage	53.29%	46.59%
State delegate before election
Chris Obenshain
Republican
State delegate after election
Lily Franklin
Democratic

House District 41 contains portions of Montgomery County and Roanoke County. Incumbent delegate is Republican Chris Obenshain, who was first elected in 2023.

=== Republican primary ===
==== Nominee ====
- Chris Obenshain, incumbent

=== Democratic primary ===
==== Nominee ====
- Lily Franklin, former Chief of Staff for Sam Rasoul and nominee for this seat in 2023

=== General election ===
==== Endorsements ====
Chris Obenshain (R)

Organizations

- Americans for Prosperity
Lily Franklin (D)

Organizations

- EMILYs List

Predictions

Source	Ranking	As of
State Navigate	Lean D (flip)	September 9, 2025

==== Results ====
2025 Virginia 41st House of Delegates District general election
Party	Candidate	Votes	%
Democratic	Lily Franklin	17,683	53.29%
Republican	Chris Obenshain (incumbent)	15,460	46.59%
Write-in		41	0.12%
Total votes		33,184	100.00%
Democratic gain from Republican			

== District 42 ==
2025 Virginia House of Delegates District 42 election
Candidate	Jason Ballard	Biko Agozino
Party	Republican	Democratic
Popular vote	20,524	12,222
Percentage	62.57%	37.26%
State delegate before election
Jason Ballard
Republican
State delegate after election
Jason Ballard
Republican

House District 42 contains the entire city of Radford and Giles County, as well as portions of Pulaski County and Montgomery County. Incumbent delegate is Republican Jason Ballard, who was first elected in 2021.

=== Republican primary ===
==== Nominee ====
- Jason Ballard, incumbent

=== Democratic primary ===
==== Nominee ====
- Biko Agozino, sociology professor at Virginia Tech

=== General election ===
Predictions

Source	Ranking	As of
State Navigate	Solid R	August 15, 2025

==== Results ====
2025 Virginia 42nd House of Delegates District general election
Party	Candidate	Votes	%
Republican	Jason Ballard (incumbent)	20,524	62.57%
Democratic	Biko Agozino	12,222	37.26%
Write-in		55	0.17%
Total votes		32,801	100.00%
Republican hold			

== District 43 ==
2025 Virginia House of Delegates District 43 election
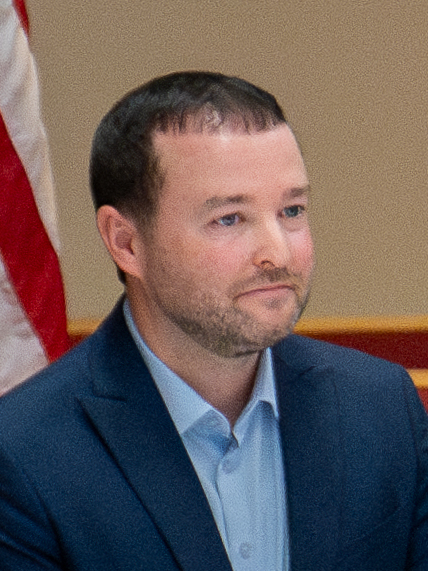

Candidate	Will Morefield	Mary Sumner
Party	Republican	Democratic
Popular vote	22,257	4,537
Percentage	82.72%	16.86%
State delegate before election
Will Morefield
Republican
State delegate after election
Will Morefield
Republican

House District 43 contains all of Bland County, Buchanan County, and Tazewell County, as well as portions of Dickenson County and Russell County. Incumbent delegate is Republican Will Morefield, who was first elected in 2009.

=== Republican primary ===
==== Nominee ====
- Will Morefield, incumbent state delegate

=== Democratic primary ===
==== Nominee ====
- Mary Sumner, nurse

=== General election ===
Predictions

Source	Ranking	As of
State Navigate	Solid R	August 15, 2025

==== Results ====
2025 Virginia 43rd House of Delegates District general election
Party	Candidate	Votes	%
Republican	Will Morefield (incumbent)	22,257	82.72%
Democratic	Mary Sumner	4,537	16.86%
Write-in		111	0.41%
Total votes		26,905	100.00%
Republican hold			

== District 44 ==
2025 Virginia House of Delegates District 44 election
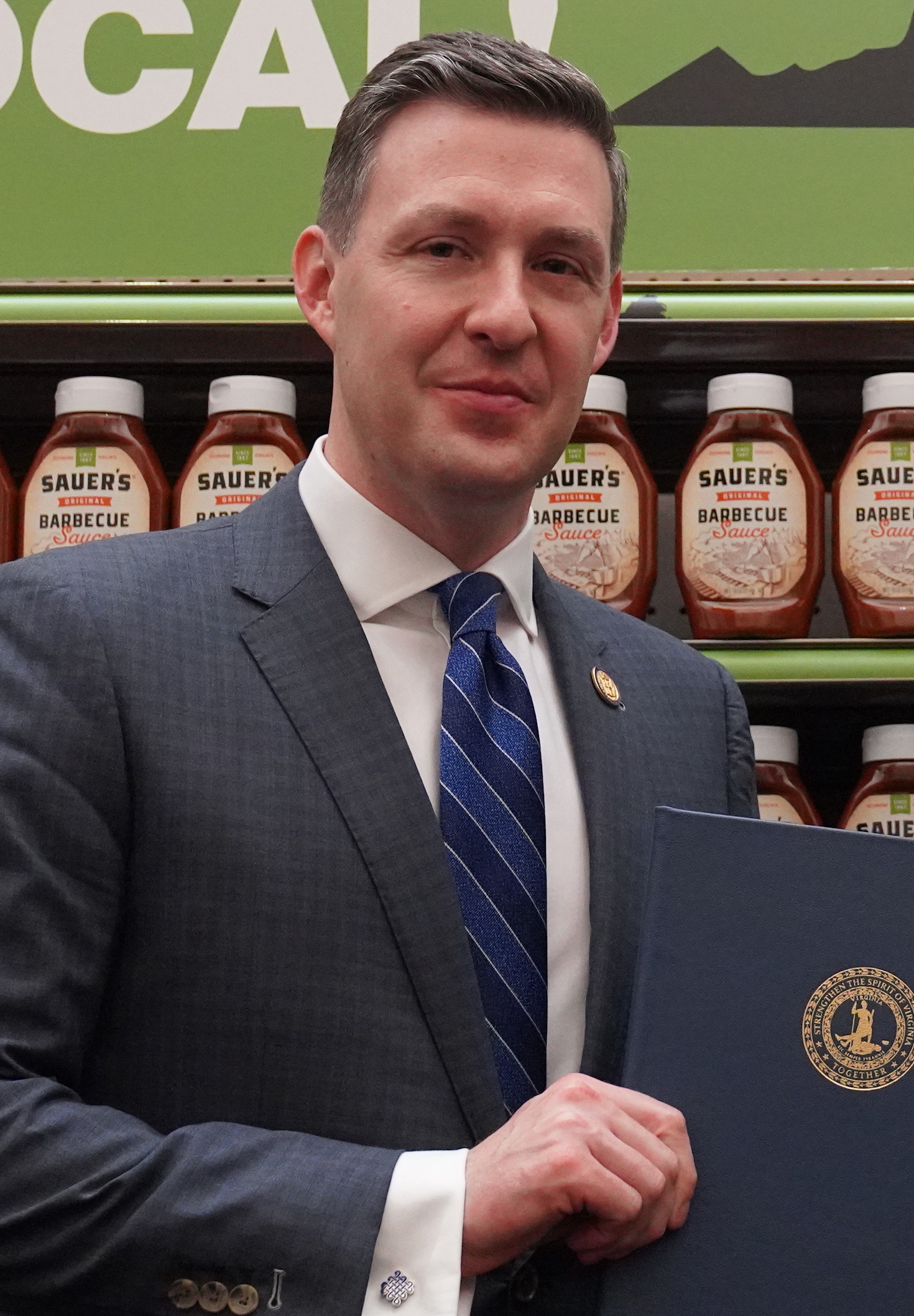

Candidate	Israel O'Quinn	Cindy Green
Party	Republican	Democratic
Popular vote	24,296	7,247
Percentage	76.92%	22.94%
State delegate before election
Israel O'Quinn
Republican
State delegate after election
Israel O'Quinn
Republican

House District 44 contains the entire city of Bristol and Washington County, as well as portions of Russell County. Incumbent delegate is Republican Israel O'Quinn, who was first elected in 2011.

=== Republican primary ===
==== Nominee ====
- Israel O'Quinn, incumbent

=== Democratic primary ===
==== Nominee ====
- Cindy Green

=== General election ===
Predictions

Source	Ranking	As of
State Navigate	Solid R	August 15, 2025

==== Results ====
2025 Virginia 44th House of Delegates District general election
Party	Candidate	Votes	%
Republican	Israel O'Quinn (incumbent)	24,296	76.92%
Democratic	Cindy Green	7,247	22.94%
Write-in		45	0.14%
Total votes		31,588	100.00%
Republican hold			

== District 45 ==
2025 Virginia House of Delegates District 45 election
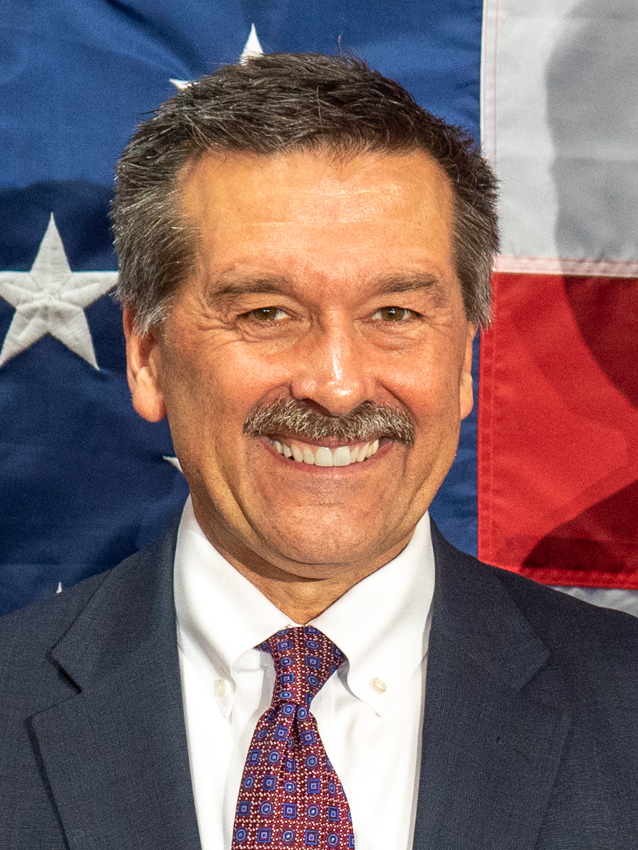

Candidate	Terry Kilgore	Josh Outsey
Party	Republican	Democratic
Popular vote	21,987	4,428
Percentage	82.74%	16.66%
State delegate before election
Terry Kilgore
Republican
State delegate after election
Terry Kilgore
Republican

House District 45 contains the entire city of Norton, Lee County, Scott County, and Wise County, as well as portions of Dickenson County. Incumbent Delegate is Republican Terry Kilgore, who was first elected in 1993.

=== Republican primary ===
==== Nominee ====
- Terry Kilgore, incumbent

=== Democratic primary ===
==== Nominee ====
- Josh Outsey, actor

=== General election ===
Predictions

Source	Ranking	As of
State Navigate	Solid R	August 15, 2025

==== Results ====
2025 Virginia 36th House of Delegates District general election
Party	Candidate	Votes	%
Republican	Terry Kilgore (incumbent)	21,987	82.74%
Democratic	Josh Outsey	4,428	16.66%
Write-in		158	0.59%
Total votes		26,573	100.00%
Republican hold			

== District 46 ==
2025 Virginia House of Delegates District 46 election
Candidate	Mitchell Cornett	Jamie Hendry
Party	Republican	Democratic
Popular vote	23,387	6,749
Percentage	77.46%	22.35%
State delegate before election
Jed Arnold
Republican
State delegate after election
Mitchell Cornett
Republican

House District 46 contains all of Grayson County, Smyth County, and Wythe County, as well as portions of Pulaski County. The incumbent delegate is Republican Jed Arnold, who was first elected in a special election in 2023; he is not seeking re-election.

=== Republican primary ===
==== Nominee ====
- Mitchell Cornett, Grayson County Supervisor

==== Eliminated in primary ====
- Adam Tolbert, Vice-chair of the Virginia Lottery Board

==== Declined ====
- Jed Arnold, incumbent

==== Endorsements ====
Mitchell Cornett

State legislators

- Bill Stanley, state senator from the 7th district (2011-present)
Adam Tolbert

Statewide officials

- Winsome Earle-Sears, lieutenant governor (2022-present)
- Jason Miyares, attorney general (2022-present)
- Glenn Youngkin, governor (2022-present)

State legislators

- Jed Arnold, incumbent state delegate (2023-present)
- Todd Gilbert, speaker (2022-2024) and state delegate from the 33rd district (2006-present)

==== Results ====
2025 Virginia's 46th House of Delegates district Republican primary
Party	Candidate	Votes	%
Republican	Mitchell Cornett	1,609	54.49
Republican	Adam Tolbert	1,344	45.51
Total votes		2,953	100.00%

=== Democratic primary ===
==== Nominee ====
- Jamie Hendry, associate professor at Bucknell University

=== General election ===
Predictions

Source	Ranking	As of
State Navigate	Solid R	August 15, 2025

==== Results ====
2025 Virginia 46th House of Delegates District general election
Party	Candidate	Votes	%
Republican	Mitchell Cornett	23,387	77.46%
Democratic	Jamie Hendry	6,749	22.35%
Write-in		57	0.19%
Total votes		30,193	100.00%
Republican hold			

== District 47 ==
2025 Virginia House of Delegates District 47 election
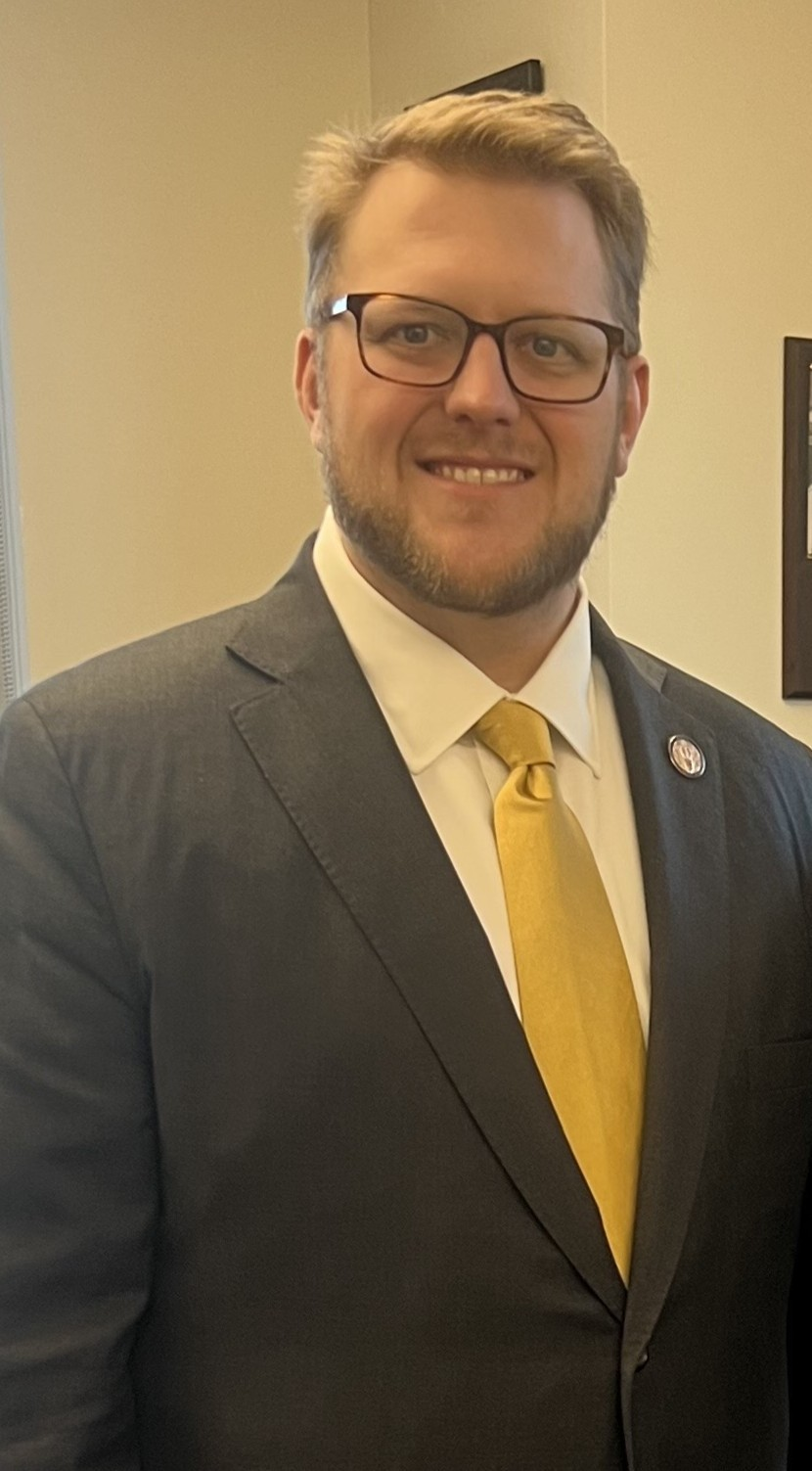

Candidate	Wren Williams	Yvonne Rorrer
Party	Republican	Democratic
Popular vote	23,912	8,209
Percentage	74.17%	25.46%
State delegate before election
Wren Williams
Republican
State delegate after election
Wren Williams
Republican

House District 47 contains the entire city of Galax, Carroll County, Floyd County, and Patrick County, as well as portions of Henry County. Incumbent delegate is Republican Wren Williams, who was also first elected in 2021.

=== Republican primary ===
==== Nominee ====
- Wren Williams, incumbent

=== Democratic primary ===
==== Nominee ====
- Yvonne Rorrer, Court Appointed Special Advocate

=== General election ===
Predictions

Source	Ranking	As of
State Navigate	Solid R	August 15, 2025

==== Results ====
2025 Virginia 47th House of Delegates District general election
Party	Candidate	Votes	%
Republican	Wren Williams (incumbent)	23,912	74.17%
Democratic	Yvonne Rorrer	8,209	25.46%
Write-in		119	0.37%
Total votes		32,240	100.00%
Republican hold			

== District 48 ==
2025 Virginia House of Delegates District 48 election
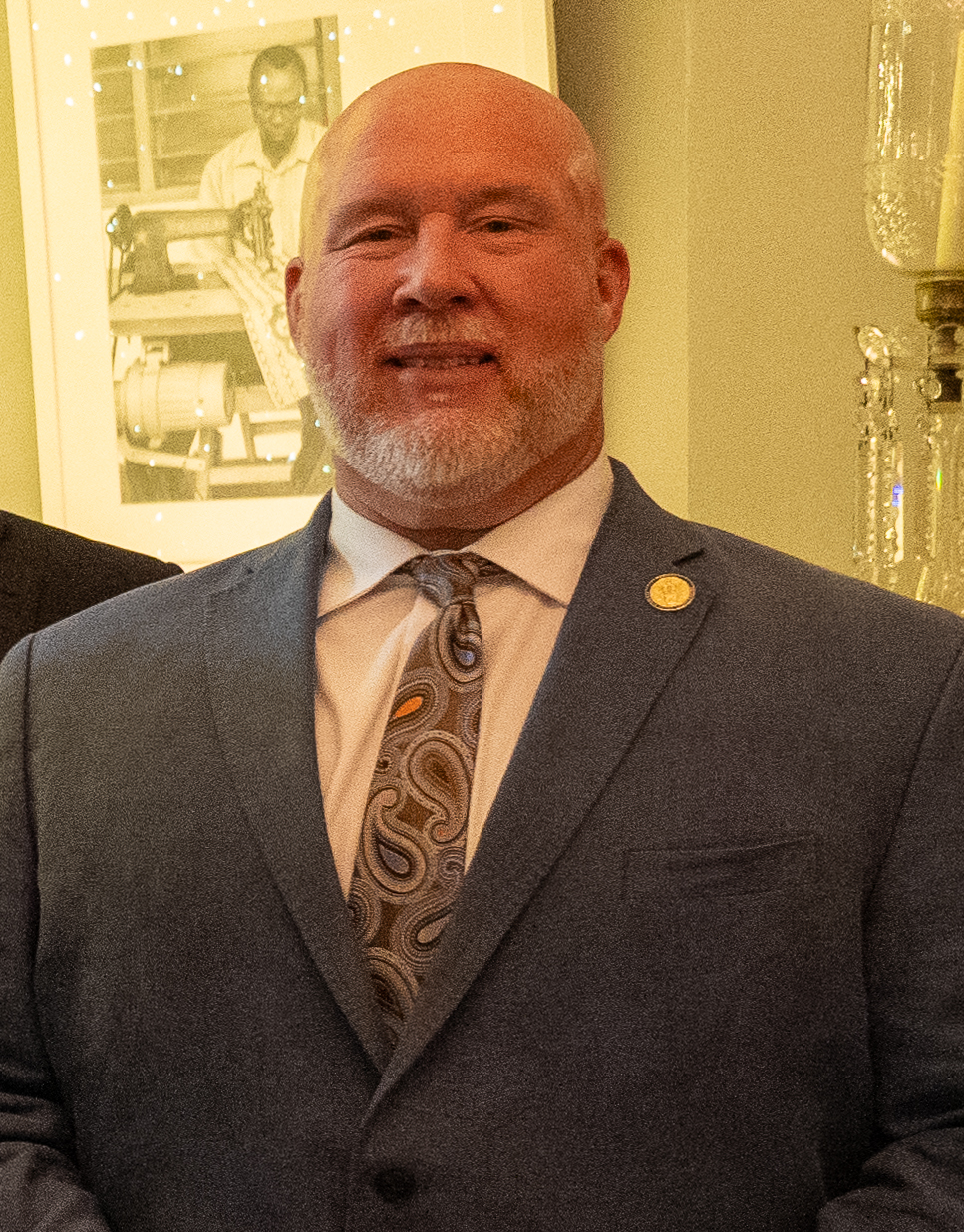

Candidate	Eric Philips	Mel Cartwright
Party	Republican	Democratic
Popular vote	19,868	10,797
Percentage	63.65%	34.59%
State delegate before election
Eric Philips
Republican
State delegate after election
Eric Philips
Republican

House District 48 contains the entire city of Martinsville, as well as portions of Henry County and Pittsylvania County. Incumbent delegate is Republican Eric Philips, who was first elected in 2024.

=== Republican primary ===
==== Nominee ====
- Eric Philips, incumbent

=== Democratic primary ===
==== Nominee ====
- Mel Cartwright, activist and nominee for this seat in the 2024 special election

=== Independents ===
==== Declared ====
- Barbara Hancock, businesswoman

=== General election ===
Predictions

Source	Ranking	As of
State Navigate	Solid R	August 15, 2025

==== Results ====
2025 Virginia 48th House of Delegates District general election
Party	Candidate	Votes	%
Republican	Eric Philips (incumbent)	19,868	63.65%
Democratic	Mel Cartwright	10,797	34.59%
Independent	Barbara Hancock	519	1.66%
Write-in		32	0.10%
Total votes		31,216	100.00%
Republican hold			

== District 49 ==
2025 Virginia House of Delegates District 49 election
Candidate	Madison Whittle	Gary Miller
Party	Republican	Democratic
Popular vote	15,206	13,479
Percentage	52.91%	46.90%
State delegate before election
Danny Marshall
Republican
State delegate after election
Madison Whittle
Republican

House District 49 contains the entire city of Danville, as well as portions of Halifax County and Pittsylvania County. Incumbent delegate is Republican Danny Marshall, who was first elected in 2001.

=== Republican primary ===
==== Nominee ====
- Madison Whittle, Danville City Council member

==== Eliminated in primary ====
- Vanessa Scearce, member of the Danville Pittsylvania County Chamber of Commerce

==== Declined ====
- Danny Marshall, incumbent

==== Results ====
2025 Virginia's 49th House of Delegates district Republican primary
Party	Candidate	Votes	%
Republican	Madison Whittle	2,852	85.21%
Republican	Vanessa Scearce	495	14.79%
Total votes		3,647	100.00%

=== Democratic primary ===
==== Nominee ====
- Gary Miller, Danville City Council member

==== Eliminated in primary ====
- Jasmine Lipscomb, U.S. Marine veteran and candidate for this seat in 2023

==== Results ====
2025 Virginia's 49th House of Delegates district Democratic primary
Party	Candidate	Votes	%
Democratic	Gary Miller	1,731	53.74%
Democratic	Jasmine Lipscomb	1,490	46.26%
Total votes		3,221	100.00%

=== General election ===
==== Endorsements ====
Madison Whittle (R)

Organizations

- Americans for Prosperity

Predictions

Source	Ranking	As of
State Navigate	Likely R	August 15, 2025

==== Results ====
2025 Virginia 49th House of Delegates District general election
Party	Candidate	Votes	%
Republican	Madison Whittle	15,206	52.91%
Democratic	Gary Miller	13,479	46.90%
Write-in		53	0.18%
Total votes		28,738	100.00%
Republican hold			

== District 50 ==
2025 Virginia House of Delegates District 50 election
Candidate	Tommy Wright	Earnadette Powell Farrar
Party	Republican	Democratic
Popular vote	19,365	11,973
Percentage	60.28%	37.27%
State delegate before election
Tommy Wright
Republican
State delegate after election
Tommy Wright
Republican

House District 50 contains all of Charlotte County, Lunenburg County, and Mecklenburg County, as well as portions of Halifax County and Prince Edward County. Incumbent delegate is Republican Tommy Wright who was first elected in 2000.

=== Republican primary ===
==== Nominee ====
- Tommy Wright, incumbent

=== Democratic primary ===
==== Nominee ====
- Earnadette Powell Farrar

=== Independents ===
==== Declared ====
- Trudy Berry, U.S. Air Force veteran and perennial candidate

=== General election ===
Predictions

Source	Ranking	As of
State Navigate	Solid R	August 15, 2025

==== Results ====
2025 Virginia 50th House of Delegates District general election
Party	Candidate	Votes	%
Republican	Tommy Wright (incumbent)	19,365	60.28%
Democratic	Earnadette Powell Farrar	11,973	37.27%
Independent	Trudy Berry	739	2.30%
Write-in		49	0.15%
Total votes		32,126	100.00%
Republican hold			

== District 51 ==
2025 Virginia House of Delegates District 51 election
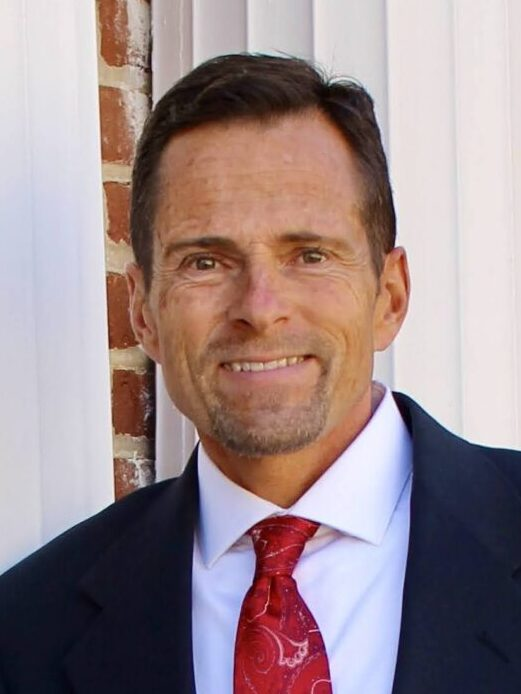

Candidate	Eric Zehr	Joy Powers
Party	Republican	Democratic
Popular vote	28,123	9,130
Percentage	75.39%	24.47%
State delegate before election
Eric Zehr
Republican
State delegate after election
Eric Zehr
Republican

House District 51 contains portions of Bedford County, Campbell County, and Pittsylvania County. Incumbent delegate is Republican Eric Zehr, who was first elected in 2023.

=== Republican primary ===
==== Nominee ====
- Eric Zehr, incumbent

=== Democratic primary ===
==== Nominee ====
- Joy Powers, farmer

=== General election ===
Predictions

Source	Ranking	As of
State Navigate	Solid R	August 15, 2025

==== Results ====
2025 Virginia 51st House of Delegates District general election
Party	Candidate	Votes	%
Republican	Eric Zehr (incumbent)	28,123	75.39%
Democratic	Joy Powers	9,130	24.47%
Write-in		51	0.14%
Total votes		37,304	100.00%
Republican hold			

== District 52 ==
2025 Virginia House of Delegates District 52 election
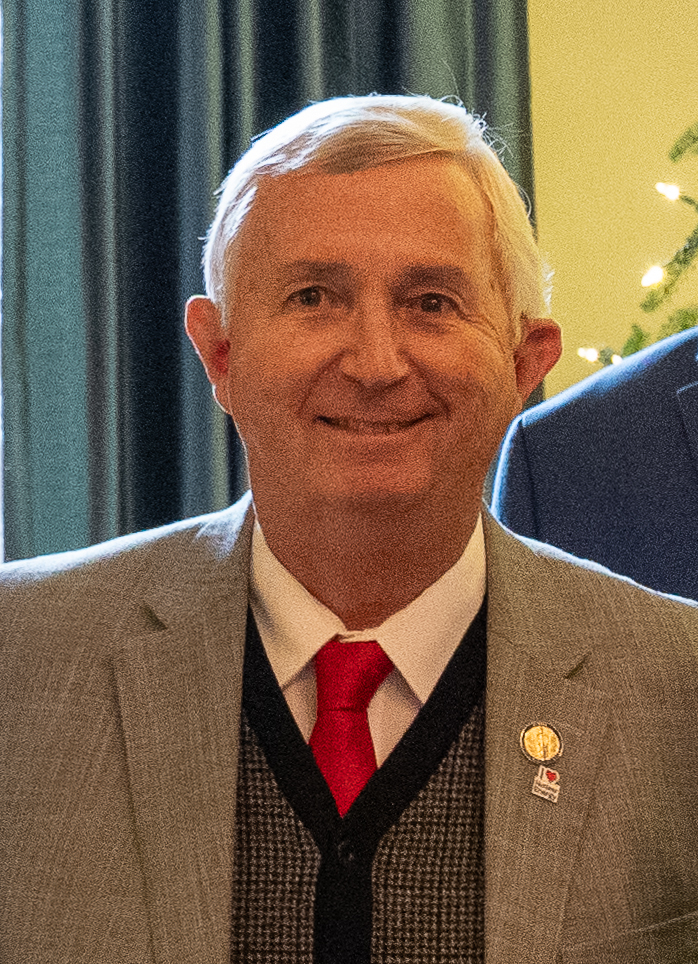

Candidate	Wendell Walker	Risë Hayes
Party	Republican	Democratic
Popular vote	16,656	13,167
Percentage	55.78%	44.09%
State delegate before election
Wendell Walker
Republican
State delegate after election
Wendell Walker
Republican

House District 52 contains the entire city of Lynchburg and portions of Campbell County. Incumbent delegate is Republican Wendell Walker, who was first elected in 2019.

=== Republican primary ===
==== Nominee ====
- Wendell Walker, incumbent

=== Democratic primary ===
==== Nominee ====
- Risë Hayes

==== Endorsements ====
Wendell Walker (R)

Organizations

- Americans for Prosperity
Risë Hayes

Organizations

- LGBTQ+ Victory Fund

=== General election ===
Predictions

Source	Ranking	As of
State Navigate	Likely R	August 15, 2025

==== Results ====
2025 Virginia 52nd House of Delegates District general election
Party	Candidate	Votes	%
Republican	Wendell Walker (incumbent)	16,656	55.78%
Democratic	Risë Hayes	13,167	44.09%
Write-in		39	0.13%
Total votes		29,862	100.00%
Republican hold			

== District 53 ==
2025 Virginia House of Delegates District 53 election
Candidate	Tim Griffin	Samuel Soghor
Party	Republican	Democratic
Popular vote	28,219	12,350
Percentage	69.42%	30.38%
State delegate before election
Tim Griffin
Republican
State delegate after election
Tim Griffin
Republican

House District 53 contains all of Amherst County, as well as portions of Bedford County and Nelson County. Incumbent delegate is Republican Tim Griffin, who was first elected in 2023.

=== Republican primary ===
==== Nominee ====
- Tim Griffin, incumbent

=== Democratic primary ===
==== Nominee ====
- Samuel Soghor, community activist and perennial candidate

=== General election ===
Predictions

Source	Ranking	As of
State Navigate	Solid R	August 15, 2025

==== Results ====
2025 Virginia 53rd House of Delegates District general election
Party	Candidate	Votes	%
Republican	Tim Griffin (incumbent)	28,219	69.42%
Democratic	Samuel Soghor	12,350	30.38%
Write-in		80	0.20%
Total votes		40,649	100.00%
Republican hold			

== District 54 ==
2025 Virginia House of Delegates District 54 election
Candidate	Katrina Callsen
Party	Democratic
Popular vote	29,976
Percentage	97.57%
State delegate before election
Katrina Callsen
Democratic
State delegate after election
Katrina Callsen
Democratic

House District 54 contains the entire city of Charlottesville and portions of Albemarle County. Incumbent delegate is Democrat Katrina Callsen, who was first elected in 2023.

=== Democratic primary ===
==== Nominee ====
- Katrina Callsen, incumbent

=== General election ===
Predictions

Source	Ranking	As of
State Navigate	Solid D	August 15, 2025

==== Results ====
2025 Virginia 54th House of Delegates District general election
Party	Candidate	Votes	%
Democratic	Katrina Callsen (incumbent)	29,976	97.57%
Write-in		747	2.43%
Total votes		30,723	100.00%
Democratic hold			

== District 55 ==
2025 Virginia House of Delegates District 55 election
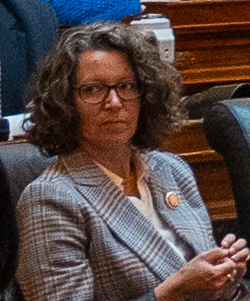
Candidate	Amy Laufer
Party	Democratic
Popular vote	33,083
Percentage	91.55%
State delegate before election
Amy Laufer
Democratic
State delegate after election
Amy Laufer
Democratic

House District 55 contains portions of Albemarle County, Fluvanna County, Louisa County, and Nelson County. Incumbent delegate is Democrat Amy Laufer, who was first elected in 2023.

=== Democratic primary ===
==== Nominee ====
- Amy Laufer, incumbent

=== General election ===
Predictions

Source	Ranking	As of
State Navigate	Solid D	August 15, 2025

==== Results ====
2025 Virginia 55th House of Delegates District general election
Party	Candidate	Votes	%
Democratic	Amy Laufer (incumbent)	33,083	91.55%
Write-in		3,053	8.45%
Total votes		36,136	100.00%
Democratic hold			

== District 56 ==
2025 Virginia House of Delegates District 56 election
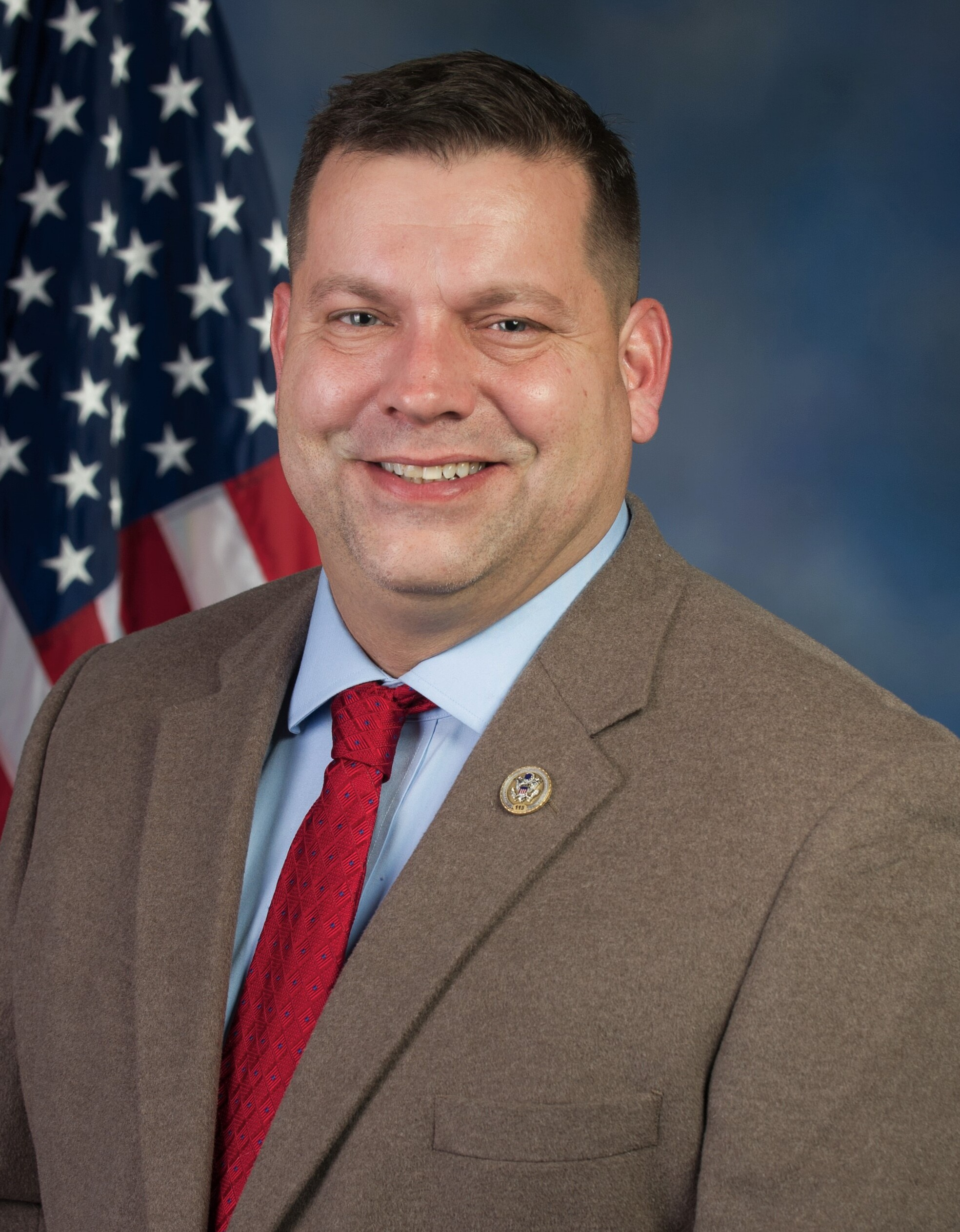

Candidate	Tom Garrett	Angela Chainer
Party	Republican	Democratic
Popular vote	25,259	16,224
Percentage	60.77%	39.03%
State delegate before election
Tom Garrett
Republican
State delegate after election
Tom Garrett
Republican

House District 56 contains all of Appomattox County, Buckingham County, and Cumberland County, as well as portions of Fluvanna County, Goochland County, Louisa County, and Prince Edward County. Incumbent delegate is Republican Tom Garrett, who was first elected in 2023.

=== Republican primary ===
==== Nominee ====
- Tom Garrett, incumbent

=== Democratic primary ===
==== Nominee ====
- Angela Chainer, former at-large member of the Fluvanna County Economic Development and Tourism Advisory Council

=== General election ===
Predictions

Source	Ranking	As of
State Navigate	Solid R	August 15, 2025

==== Results ====
2025 Virginia 56th House of Delegates District general election
Party	Candidate	Votes	%
Republican	Tom Garrett (incumbent)	25,259	60.77%
Democratic	Angela Chainer	16,224	39.03%
Write-in		82	0.20%
Total votes		41,565	100.00%
Republican hold			

== District 57 ==
2025 Virginia House of Delegates District 57 election

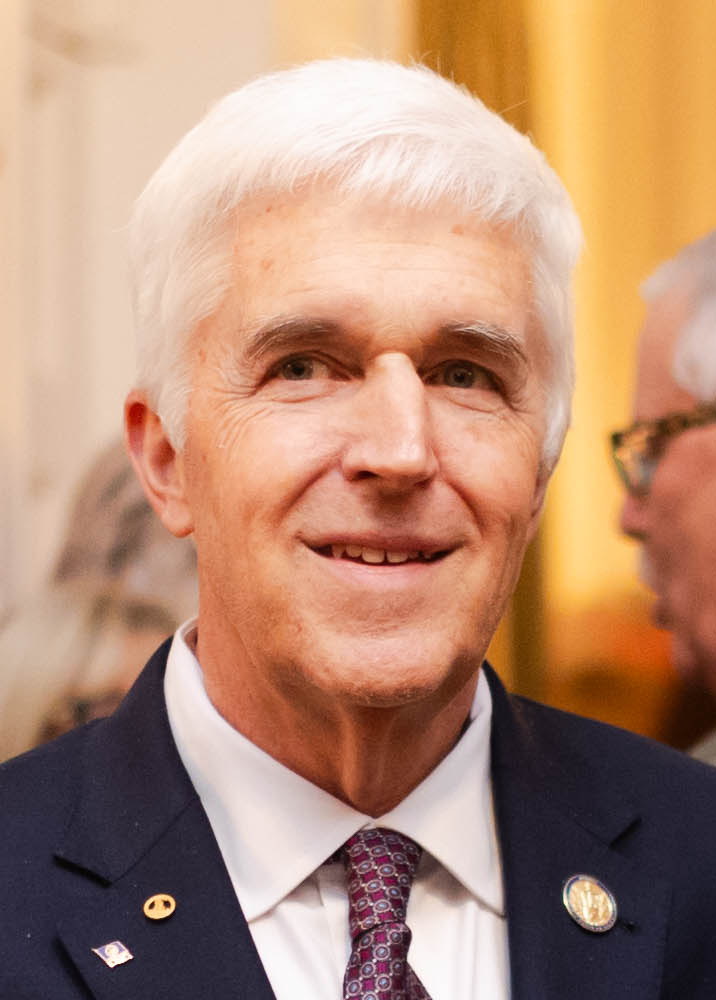
Candidate	May Nivar	David Owen
Party	Democratic	Republican
Popular vote	24,187	19,296
Percentage	55.54%	44.31%
State delegate before election
David Owen
Republican
State delegate after election
May Nivar
Democratic

House District 57 contains portions of Goochland County and Henrico County. Incumbent delegate is Republican David Owen, who was first elected in 2023. The district is one of seven Republican-held districts won by Democratic Vice President Kamala Harris in the 2024 United States presidential election.

=== Republican primary ===
==== Nominee ====
- David Owen, incumbent

=== Democratic primary ===
==== Nominee ====
- May Nivar, community outreach lead at Altria and former chair of the Virginia Asian Advisory Board

==== Eliminated in primary ====
- Andrew Schear, small business owner

==== Endorsements ====
May Nivar

Organizations

- EMILYs List

==== Results ====
2025 Virginia's 57th House of Delegates district Democratic primary
Party	Candidate	Votes	%
Democratic	May Nivar	4,231	62.81%
Democratic	Andrew Schear	2,505	37.19%
Total votes		6,736	100.00%

=== General election ===
==== Endorsements ====
David Owen (R)

Organizations

- Americans for Prosperity

Predictions

Source	Ranking	As of
State Navigate	Likely D (flip)	August 15, 2025

==== Results ====
2025 Virginia 57th House of Delegates District general election
Party	Candidate	Votes	%
Democratic	May Nivar	24,187	55.54%
Republican	David Owen (incumbent)	19,296	44.31%
Write-in		62	0.14%
Total votes		43,545	100.00%
Democratic gain from Republican			

== District 58 ==
2025 Virginia House of Delegates District 58 election
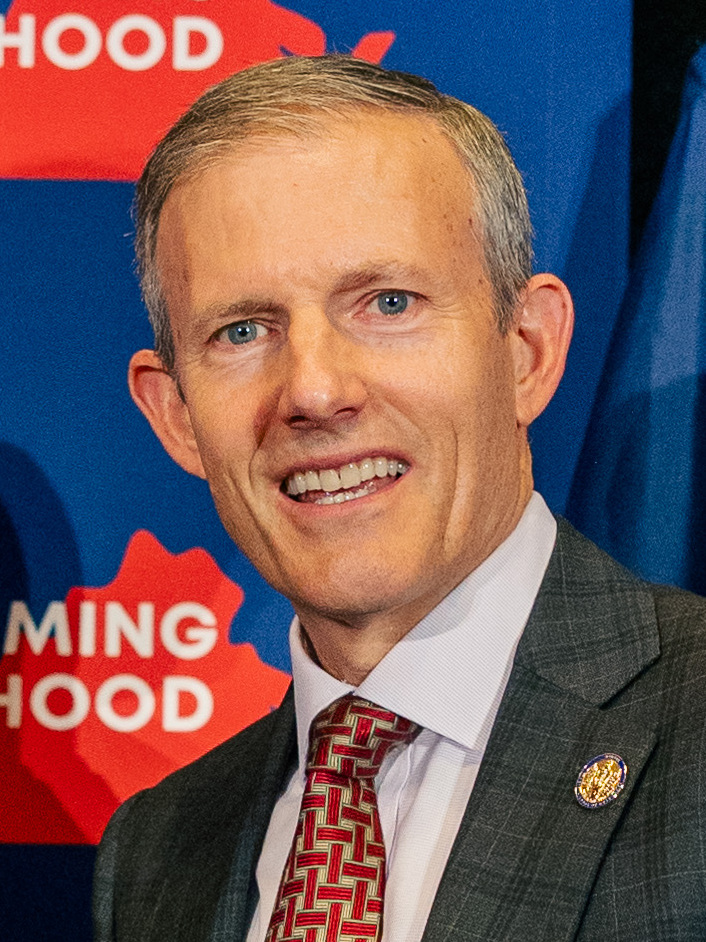

Candidate	Rodney Willett	Milad Mikhail
Party	Democratic	Republican
Popular vote	23,824	14,942
Percentage	61.33%	38.46%
State delegate before election
Rodney Willett
Democratic
State delegate after election
Rodney Willett
Democratic

House District 58 contains potions of Henrico County. Incumbent delegate is Democrat Rodney Willett, who was first elected in 2019.

=== Democratic primary ===
==== Nominee ====
- Rodney Willett, incumbent

=== Republican primary ===
==== Nominee ====
- Milad Mikhail, restaurant manager

=== General election ===
Predictions

Source	Ranking	As of
State Navigate	Solid D	August 15, 2025

==== Results ====
2025 Virginia 58th House of Delegates District general election
Party	Candidate	Votes	%
Democratic	Rodney Willett (incumbent)	23,824	61.33%
Republican	Milad Mikhail	14,942	38.46%
Write-in		82	0.21%
Total votes		38,848	100.00%
Democratic hold			

== District 59 ==
2025 Virginia House of Delegates District 59 election
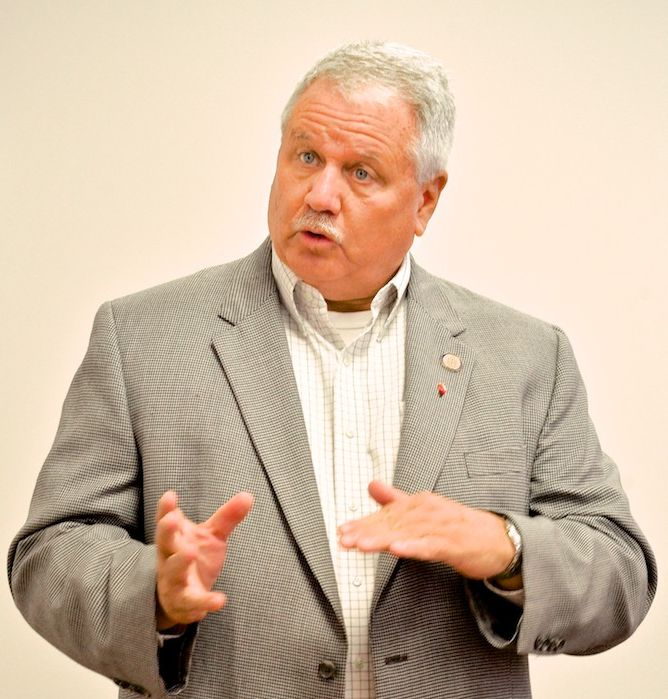

Candidate	Buddy Fowler	Scott Konopasek
Party	Republican	Democratic
Popular vote	25,425	19,247
Percentage	56.82%	43.01%
State delegate before election
Buddy Fowler
Republican
State delegate after election
Buddy Fowler
Republican

House District 59 contains portions of Hanover County, Henrico County, and Louisa County. Incumbent delegate is Republican Buddy Fowler, who was first elected in 2013.

=== Republican primary ===
==== Nominee ====
- Buddy Fowler, incumbent

=== Democratic primary ===
==== Nomniee ====
- Scott Konopasek, elections consultant

=== General election ===
Predictions

Source	Ranking	As of
State Navigate	Likely R	September 22, 2025

==== Results ====
2025 Virginia 59th House of Delegates District general election
Party	Candidate	Votes	%
Republican	Buddy Fowler (incumbent)	25,425	56.82%
Democratic	Scott Konopasek	19,247	43.01%
Write-in		78	0.17%
Total votes		44,750	100.00%
Republican hold			

== District 60 ==
2025 Virginia House of Delegates District 60 election
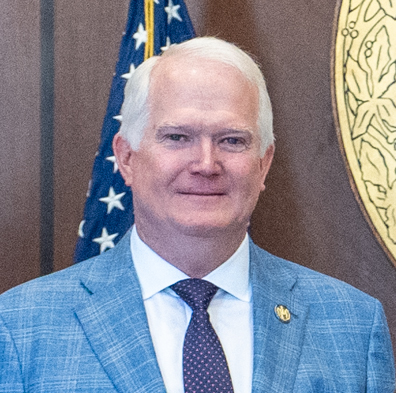

Candidate	Scott Wyatt	Andrew Ward
Party	Republican	Democratic
Popular vote	30,747	17,267
Percentage	63.92%	35.90%
State delegate before election
Scott Wyatt
Republican
State delegate after election
Scott Wyatt
Republican

House District 60 contains portions of Hanover County and New Kent County. Incumbent delegate is Republican Scott Wyatt, who was first elected in 2019.

=== Republican primary ===
==== Nominee ====
- Scott Wyatt, incumbent

=== Democratic primary ===
==== Nominee ====
- Andrew Ward, teacher

=== General election ===
Predictions

Source	Ranking	As of
State Navigate	Solid R	August 15, 2025

==== Results ====
2025 Virginia 60th House of Delegates District general election
Party	Candidate	Votes	%
Republican	Scott Wyatt (incumbent)	30,747	63.92%
Democratic	Andrew Ward	17,267	35.90%
Write-in		89	0.19%
Total votes		48,103	100.00%
Republican hold			

== District 61 ==
2025 Virginia House of Delegates District 61 election
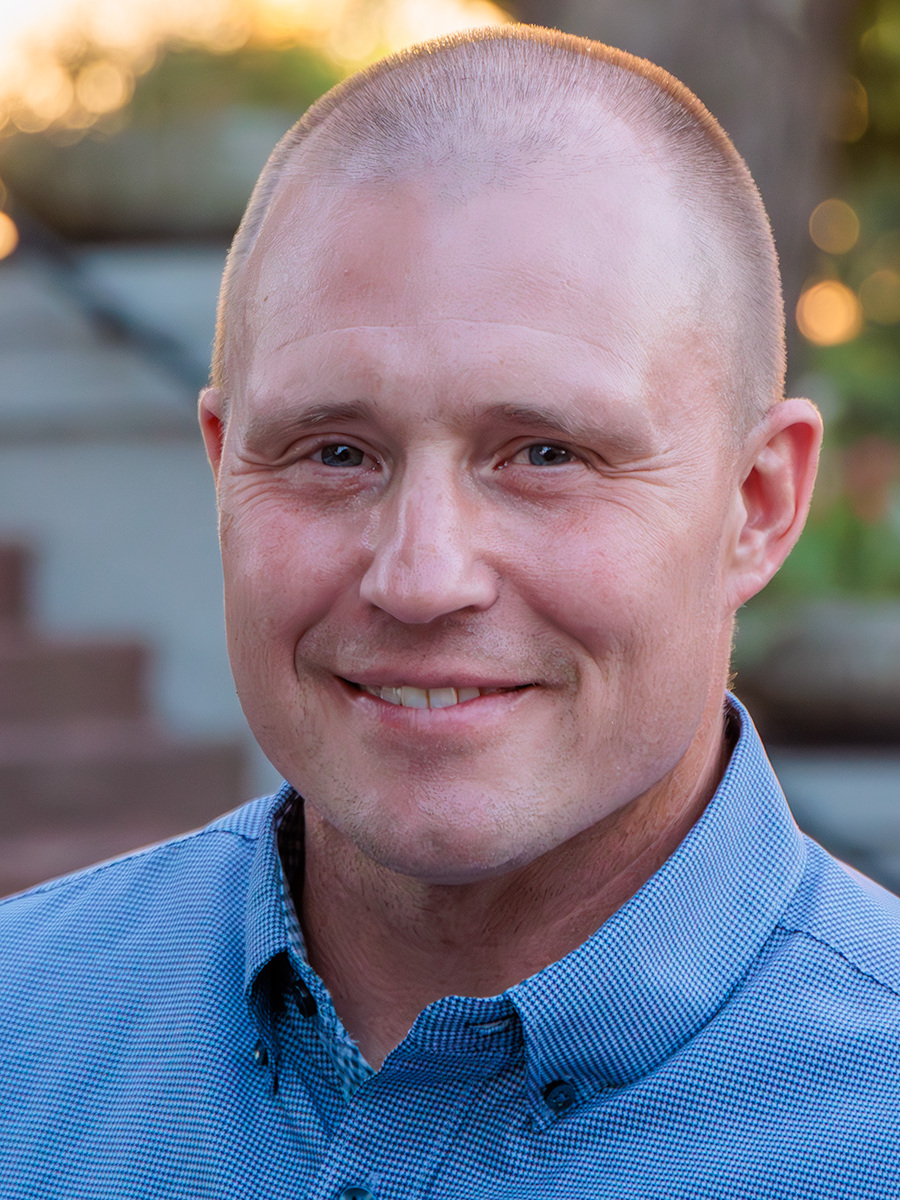

Candidate	Michael Webert	Jac Bennington
Party	Republican	Democratic
Popular vote	25,133	15,524
Percentage	61.74%	38.14%
State delegate before election
Michael Webert
Republican
State delegate after election
Michael Webert
Republican

House District 61 contains all of Rappahannock County and portions of Culpeper County and Fauquier County. Incumbent delegate is Republican Michael Webert, who was first elected in 2011.

=== Republican primary ===
==== Nominee ====
- Michael Webert. incumbent

=== Democratic primary ===
==== Nominee ====
- Jac Bennington, high school teacher

=== General election ===
Predictions

Source	Ranking	As of
State Navigate	Solid R	August 15, 2025

==== Results ====
2025 Virginia 61st House of Delegates District general election
Party	Candidate	Votes	%
Republican	Michael Webert (incumbent)	25,133	61.74%
Democratic	Jac Bennington	15,524	38.14%
Write-in		50	0.12%
Total votes		40,707	100.00%
Republican hold			

== District 62 ==
2025 Virginia House of Delegates District 62 election
Candidate	Karen Hamilton	Sara Ratcliffe
Party	Republican	Democratic
Popular vote	21,580	15,397
Percentage	58.20%	41.53%
State delegate before election
Nick Freitas
Republican
State delegate after election
Karen Hamilton
Republican

House District 62 contains all of Greene County and Madison County, as well as portions of Culpeper County and Orange County. Incumbent delegate is Republican Nick Freitas, who was first elected in 2015.

=== Republican primary ===
==== Nominee ====
- Karen Hamilton, business owner and wife of Cameron Hamilton

==== Eliminated in primary ====
- Clay Jackson, Madison County Supervisor

==== Declined ====
- Nick Freitas, incumbent

==== Results ====
2025 Virginia's 62nd House of Delegates district Republican primary
Party	Candidate	Votes	%
Republican	Karen Hamilton	2,440	58.1%
Republican	Clay Jackson	1,760	41.9%
Total votes		4,200	100.00%

=== Democratic primary ===
==== Nominee ====
- Sara Ratcliffe, consultant, nominee for this seat in 2023, and nominee for HD-58 in 2021

=== General election ===
Predictions

Source	Ranking	As of
State Navigate	Solid R	August 15, 2025

==== Results ====
2025 Virginia 62nd House of Delegates District general election
Party	Candidate	Votes	%
Republican	Karen Hamilton	21,580	58.20%
Democratic	Sara Ratcliffe	15,397	41.53%
Write-in		100	0.27%
Total votes		37,077	100.00%
Republican hold			

== District 63 ==
2025 Virginia House of Delegates District 63 election
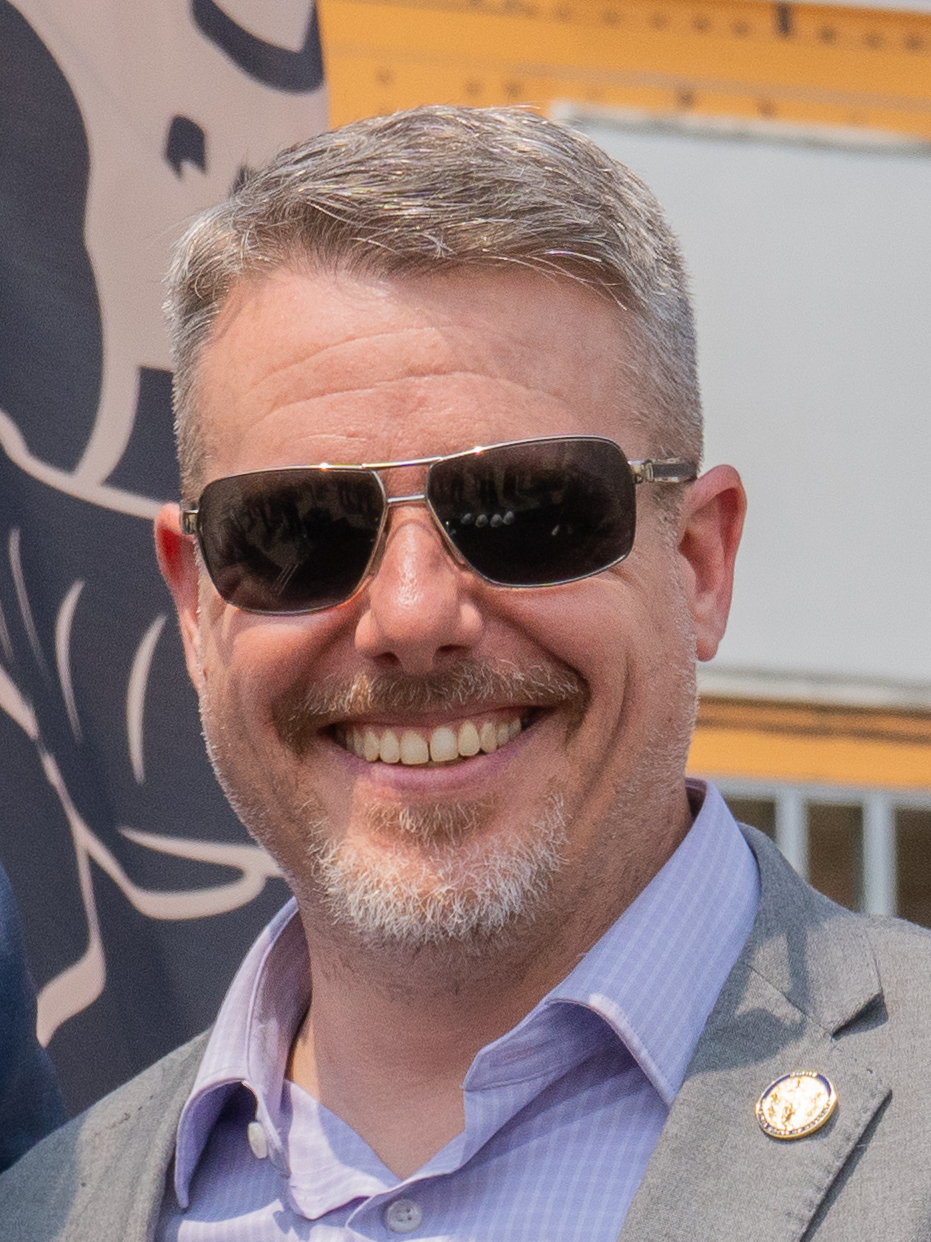

Candidate	Phil Scott	Forrest Miller
Party	Republican	Democratic
Popular vote	21,418	16,855
Percentage	55.87%	43.97%
State delegate before election
Phil Scott
Republican
State delegate after election
Phil Scott
Republican

House District 63 contains portions of Orange County and Spotsylvania County. Incumbent delegate is Republican Phil Scott, who was first elected in 2021.

=== Republican primary ===
==== Nominee ====
- Phil Scott, incumbent

=== Democratic primary ===
==== Nominee ====
- Forrest Miller, U.S. Army veteran

=== General election ===
Predictions

Source	Ranking	As of
State Navigate	Solid R	August 15, 2025

==== Results ====
2025 Virginia 63rd House of Delegates District general election
Party	Candidate	Votes	%
Republican	Phil Scott (incumbent)	21,418	55.87%
Democratic	Forrest Miller	16,855	43.97%
Write-in		59	0.15%
Total votes		38,332	100.00%
Republican hold			

== District 64 ==
2025 Virginia House of Delegates District 64 election

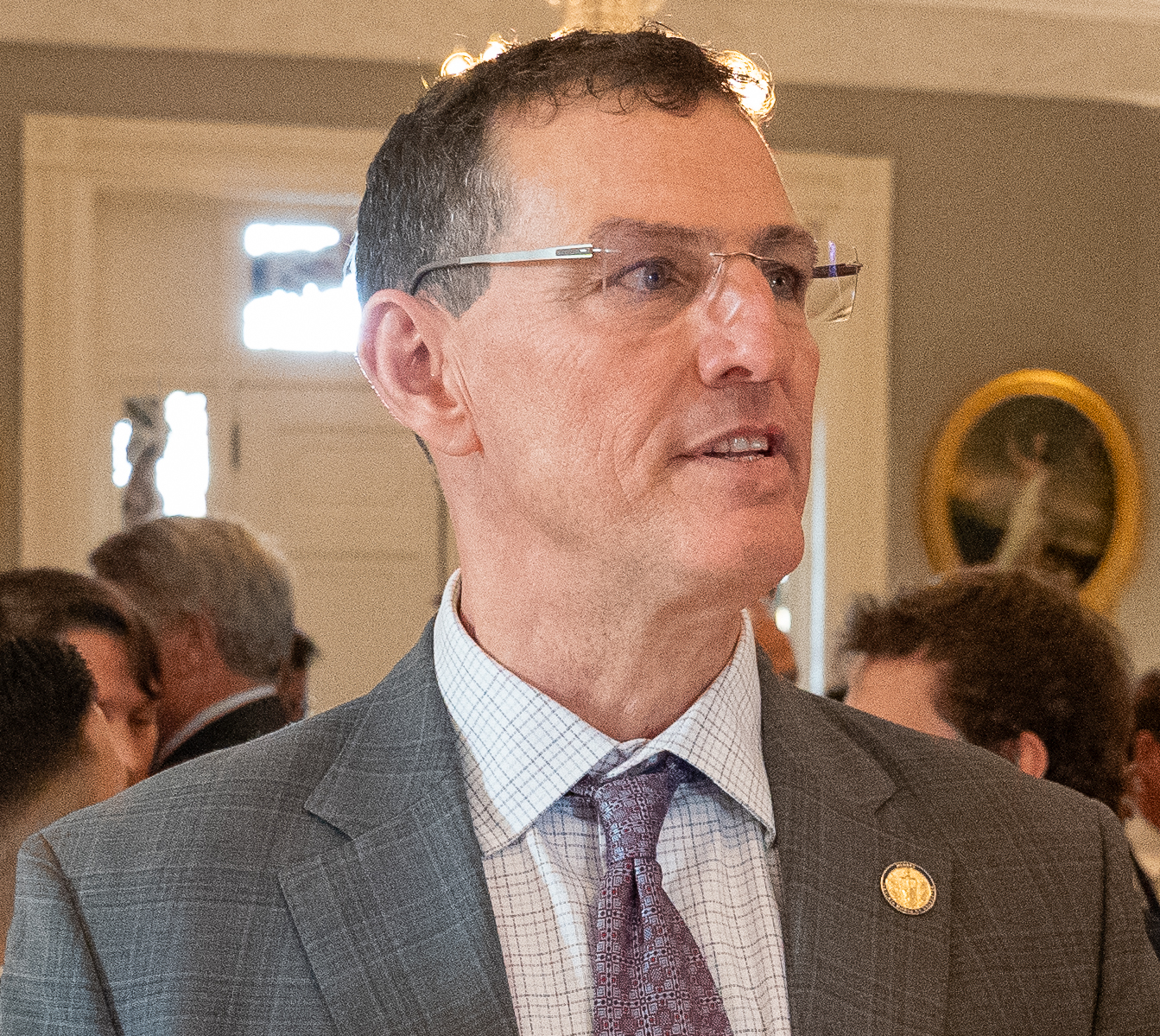
Candidate	Stacey Carroll	Paul Milde
Party	Democratic	Republican
Popular vote	19,416	17,047
Percentage	53.17%	46.69%
State delegate before election
Paul Milde
Republican
State delegate after election
Stacey Carroll
Democratic

House District 64 contains portions of Stafford County. Incumbent delegate is Republican Paul Milde, who was first elected in 2023.

=== Republican primary ===
==== Nominee ====
- Paul Milde. incumbent

=== Democratic primary ===
==== Nominee ====
- Stacey Carroll, former National Guard officer

=== General election ===
Predictions

Source	Ranking	As of
State Navigate	Lean R	September 22, 2025

==== Results ====
2025 Virginia 64th House of Delegates District general election
Party	Candidate	Votes	%
Democratic	Stacey Carroll	19,416	53.17%
Republican	Paul Milde (incumbent)	17,047	46.69%
Write-in		51	0.14%
Total votes		36,514	100.00%
Democratic gain from Republican			

== District 65 ==
2025 Virginia House of Delegates District 65 election
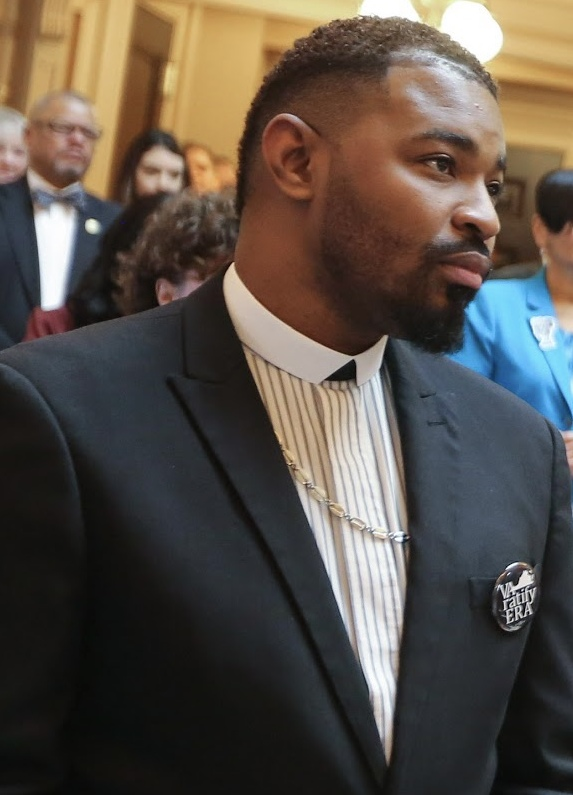

Candidate	Joshua Cole	Sean Steinway
Party	Democratic	Republican
Popular vote	20,659	14,358
Percentage	58.88%	40.92%
State delegate before election
Joshua Cole
Democratic
State delegate after election
Joshua Cole
Democratic

House District 65 contains the entire city of Fredericksburg and portions of Spotsylvania County and Stafford County. Incumbent delegate is Democrat Joshua Cole, who was first elected in 2023.

=== Democratic primary ===
==== Nominee ====
- Joshua Cole, incumbent

=== Republican primary ===
==== Nominee ====
- Sean Steinway, Stafford County deputy

=== General election ===
==== Endorsements ====
Joshua Cole (D)

Organizations

- Our Revolution

==== Results ====
Predictions

Source	Ranking	As of
State Navigate	Likely D	August 31, 2025

2025 Virginia 65th House of Delegates District general election
Party	Candidate	Votes	%
Democratic	Joshua Cole (incumbent)	20,659	58.88%
Republican	Sean Steinway	14,358	40.92%
Write-in		68	0.19%
Total votes		35,085	100.00%
Democratic hold			

== District 66 ==
2025 Virginia House of Delegates District 66 election

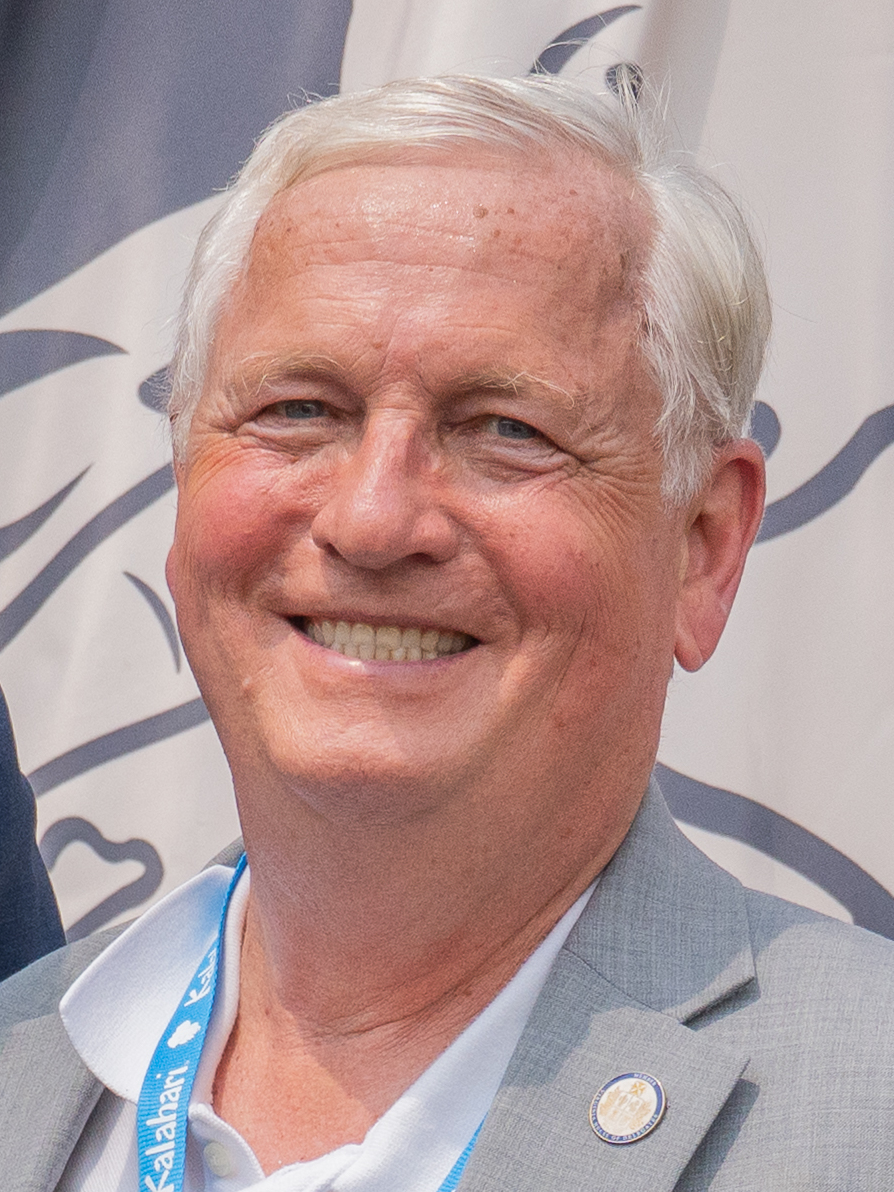
Candidate	Nicole Cole	Bobby Orrock
Party	Democratic	Republican
Popular vote	18,831	17,248
Percentage	52.15%	47.76%
State delegate before election
Bobby Orrock
Republican
State delegate after election
Nicole Cole
Democratic

House District 66 contains portions of Caroline County and Spotsylvania County. Incumbent delegate is Republican Bobby Orrock, who was first elected in 1989.

=== Republican primary ===
==== Nominee ====
- Bobby Orrock, incumbent

=== Democratic primary ===
==== Nominee ====
- Nicole Cole, Spotsylvania County School Board member

=== General election ===
Predictions

Source	Ranking	As of
State Navigate	Lean R	September 9, 2025

==== Results ====
2025 Virginia 66th House of Delegates District general election
Party	Candidate	Votes	%
Democratic	Nicole Cole	18,831	52.15%
Republican	Bobby Orrock (incumbent)	17,248	47.76%
Write-in		33	0.09%
Total votes		36,112	100.00%
Democratic gain from Republican			

== District 67 ==
2025 Virginia House of Delegates District 67 election
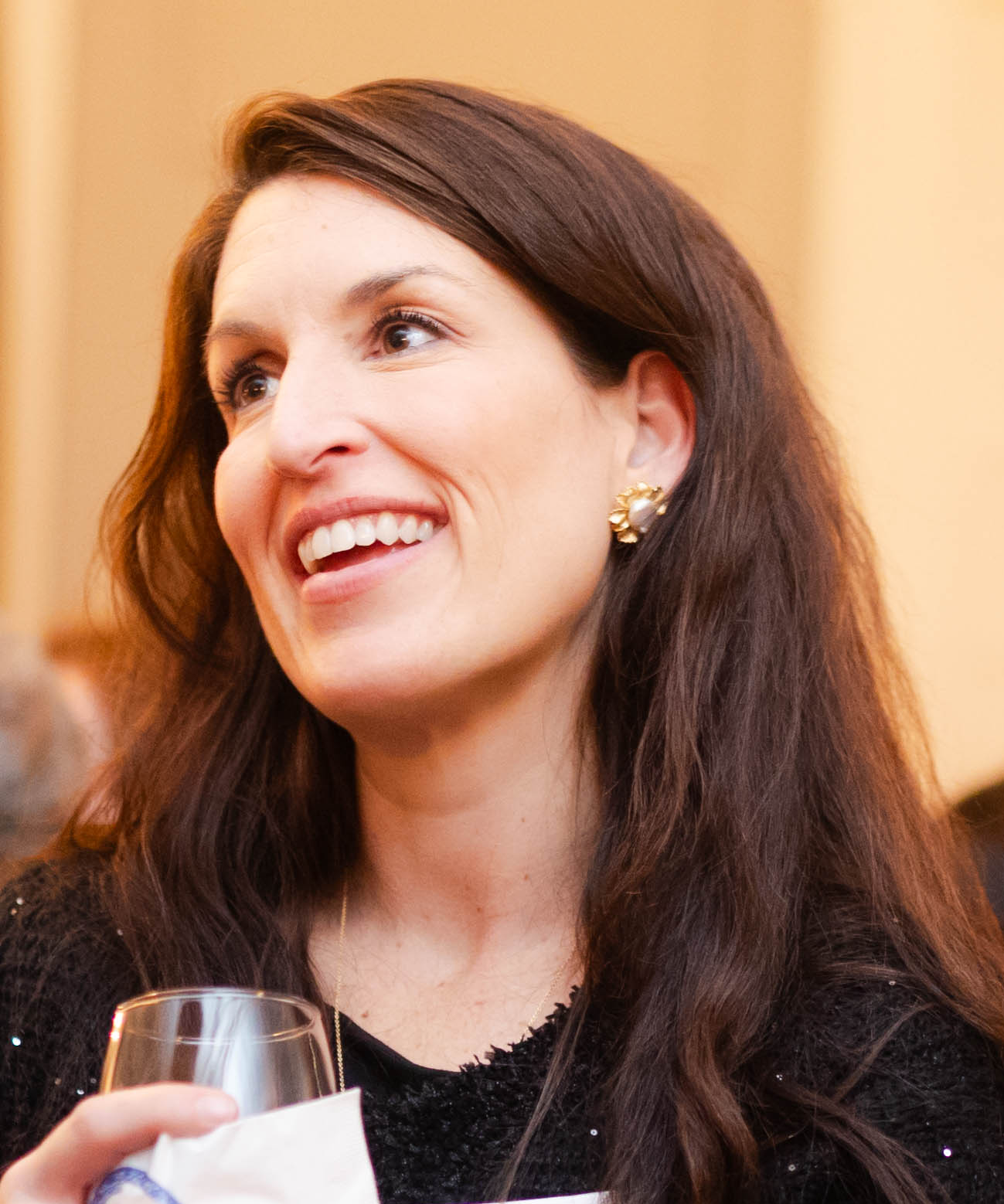

Candidate	Hillary Pugh Kent	Mario Haggerty
Party	Republican	Democratic
Popular vote	24,279	14,636
Percentage	61.12%	36.85%
State delegate before election
Hillary Pugh Kent
Republican
State delegate after election
Hillary Pugh Kent
Republican

House District 67 contains all of King George County, Lancaster County, Northumberland County, Richmond County, and Westmoreland County, as well as portions of Caroline County. Incumbent delegate is Republican Hillary Pugh Kent, who was first elected in 2023.

=== Republican primary ===
==== Nominee ====
- Hillary Pugh Kent, incumbent

=== Democratic primary ===
==== Nominee ====
- Mario Haggerty, former U.S. Navy officer and defense contractor

=== Independents ===
==== Declared ====
- Richard Kenski, nonprofit founder and candidate for this seat in 2023

=== General election ===
Predictions

Source	Ranking	As of
State Navigate	Solid R	August 15, 2025

==== Results ====
2025 Virginia 67th House of Delegates District general election
Party	Candidate	Votes	%
Republican	Hillary Pugh Kent (incumbent)	24,279	61.12%
Democratic	Mario Haggerty	14,636	36.85%
Independent	Richard Kenski	778	1.96%
Write-in		28	0.07%
Total votes		39,721	100.00%
Republican hold			

== District 68 ==
2025 Virginia House of Delegates District 68 election
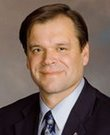
Candidate	Keith Hodges	Elaine Walters
Party	Republican	Democratic
Popular vote	28,074	13,443
Percentage	67.57%	32.35%
State delegate before election
Keith Hodges
Republican
State delegate after election
Keith Hodges
Republican

House District 68 contains all of Essex County, King & Queen County, King William County, Mathews County, and Middlesex County, as well as portions of Gloucester County. Incumbent delegate is Republican Keith Hodges, who was first elected in 2011.

=== Republican primary ===
==== Nominee ====
- Keith Hodges, incumbent

=== Democratic primary ===
==== Nominee ====
- Elaine Walters, marine biologist

=== General election ===
Predictions

Source	Ranking	As of
State Navigate	Solid R	August 15, 2025

==== Results ====
2025 Virginia 68th House of Delegates District general election
Party	Candidate	Votes	%
Republican	Keith Hodges (incumbent)	28,074	67.57%
Democratic	Elaine Walters	13,443	32.35%
Write-in		32	0.08%
Total votes		41,549	100.00%
Republican hold			

== District 69 ==
2025 Virginia House of Delegates District 69 election

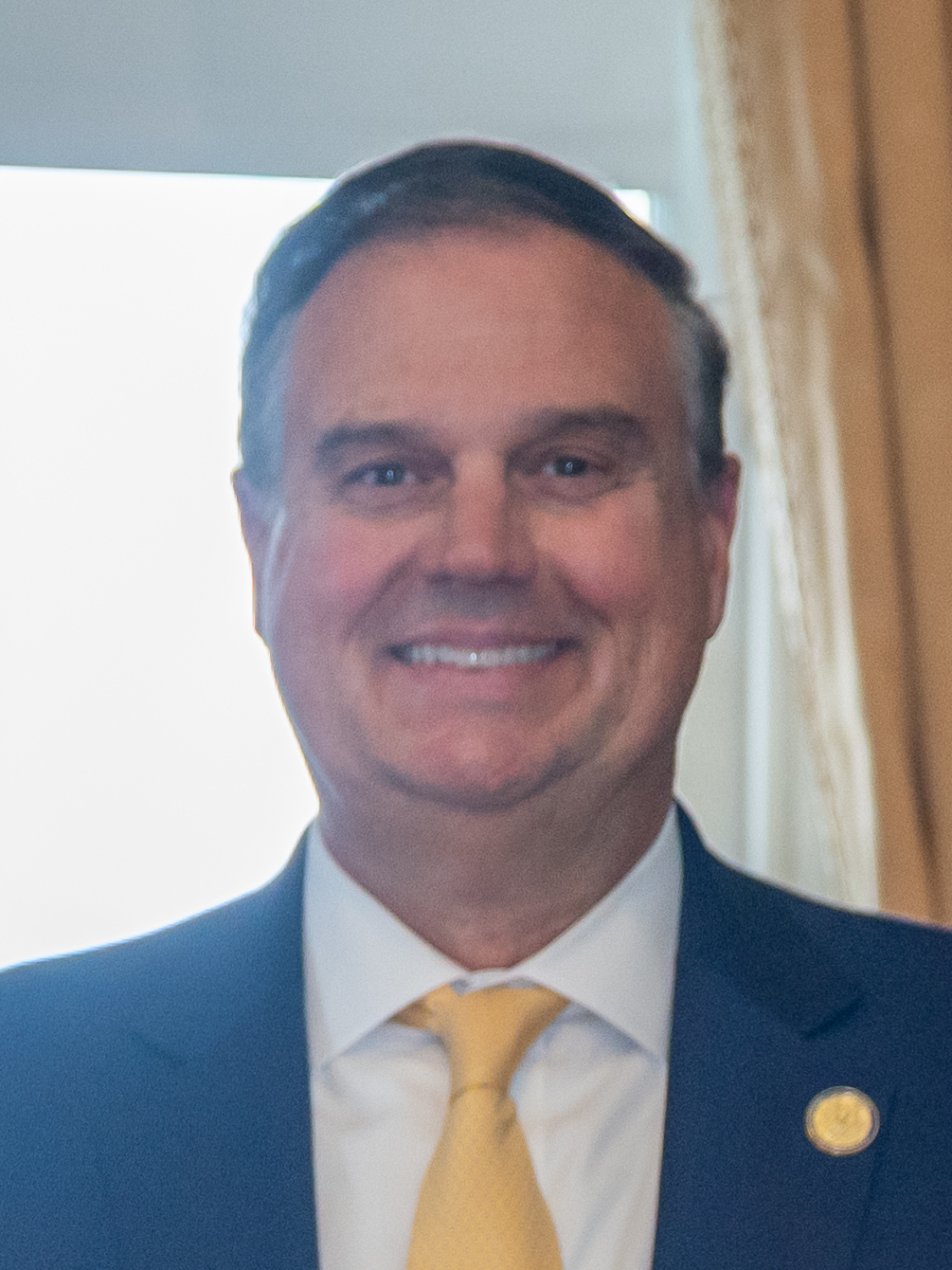
Candidate	Mark Downey	Chad Green
Party	Democratic	Republican
Popular vote	19,461	18,171
Percentage	49.81%	46.51%
State delegate before election
Chad Green
Republican
State delegate after election
Mark Downey
Democratic

House District 69 contains portions of the city of Newport News, Gloucester County, James City County, and York County. Incumbent delegate is Republican Chad Green, who was first elected in 2023.

=== Republican primary ===
==== Nominee ====
- Chad Green, incumbent

=== Democratic Primary ===
==== Nominee ====
- Mark Downey, pediatrician and nominee for HD-96 in 2019 and 2021

=== Independents ===
==== Declared ====
- Valerie Beverley, insurance agent

=== General election ===
Predictions

Source	Ranking	As of
State Navigate	Lean R	September 9, 2025

==== Results ====
2025 Virginia 69th House of Delegates District general election
Party	Candidate	Votes	%
Democratic	Mark Downey	19,461	49.81%
Republican	Chad Green (incumbent)	18,171	46.51%
Independent	Valerie Beverley	1,395	3.57%
Write-in		46	0.12%
Total votes		80,622	100.00%
Democratic gain from Republican			

== District 70 ==
2025 Virginia House of Delegates District 70 election
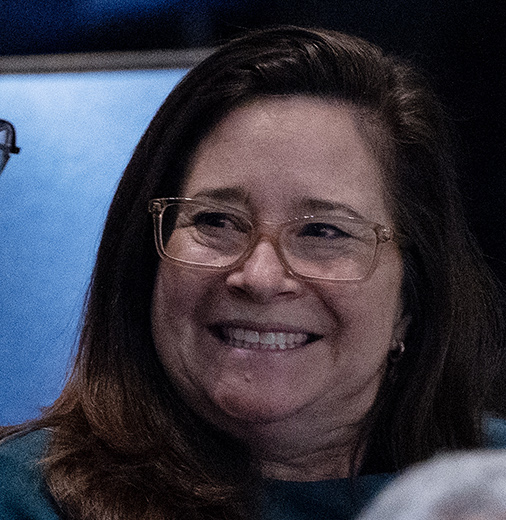

Candidate	Shelly Simonds	Cynthia Scaturico
Party	Democratic	Republican
Popular vote	18,866	10,226
Percentage	63.37%	34.35%
State delegate before election
Shelly Simonds
Democratic
State delegate after election
Shelly Simonds
Democratic

House District 70 contains portions of the city of Newport News. Incumbent delegate is Democrat Shelly Simonds, who was first elected in 2019.

=== Democratic primary ===
==== Nominee ====
- Shelly Simonds, incumbent

=== Republican primary ===
==== Nominee ====
- Cynthia Scaturico, former Carroll County, Iowa Supervisor

==== Eliminated in primary ====
- Hailey Shupe-Dollar, disabled Army combat veteran

==== Results ====
2025 Virginia's 70th House of Delegates district Republican primary
Party	Candidate	Votes	%
Republican	Cynthia Scaturico	931	74.24%
Republican	Hailey Shupe-Dollar	323	25.76%
Total votes		1,254	100.00%

=== Libertarian primary ===
==== Nominee ====
- John Bloom, Chair of the Constitution Party of Virginia and candidate for Newport News School Board in 2024

=== General election ===
Predictions

Source	Ranking	As of
State Navigate	Solid D	August 15, 2025

==== Results ====
2025 Virginia 70th House of Delegates District general election
Party	Candidate	Votes	%
Democratic	Shelly Simonds (incumbent)	18,866	63.37%
Republican	Cynthia Scaturico	10,226	34.35%
Libertarian	John Bloom	632	2.12%
Write-in		45	0.15%
Total votes		29,769	100.00%
Democratic hold			

== District 71 ==
2025 Virginia House of Delegates District 71 election

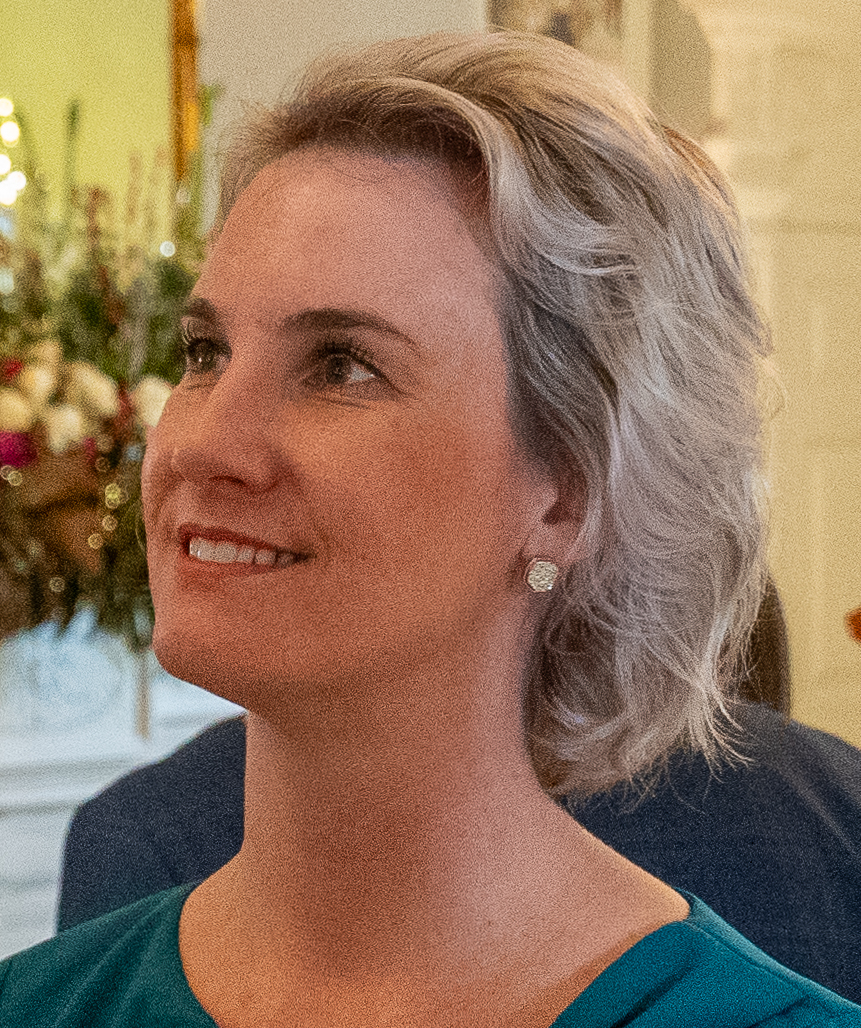
Candidate	Jessica Anderson	Amanda Batten
Party	Democratic	Republican
Popular vote	23,910	20,979
Percentage	53.19%	46.67%
State delegate before election
Amanda Batten
Republican
State delegate after election
Jessica Anderson
Democratic

House District 71 contains all of the city of Williamsburg, as well as portions of James City County and New Kent County. Incumbent delegate is Republican Amanda Batten, who was first elected in 2019. The district is one of seven Republican-held districts won by Democratic Vice President Kamala Harris in the 2024 United States presidential election.

=== Republican primary ===
==== Nominee ====
- Amanda Batten, incumbent

=== Democratic primary ===
==== Nominee ====
- Jessica Anderson, elementary school receptionist and nominee for this seat in 2023

=== General election ===
==== Endorsements ====
Amanda Batten (R)

Organizations

- Americans for Prosperity
- Virginia Police Benevolent Association
Jessica Anderson (D)

Organizations

- EMILYs List

Predictions

Source	Ranking	As of
State Navigate	Likely D (flip)	September 23, 2025

==== Results ====
2025 Virginia 71st House of Delegates District general election
Party	Candidate	Votes	%
Democratic	Jessica Anderson	23,910	53.19%
Republican	Amanda Batten (incumbent)	20,979	46.67%
Write-in		59	0.13%
Total votes		44,948	100.00%
Democratic gain from Republican			

== District 72 ==
2025 Virginia House of Delegates District 72 election
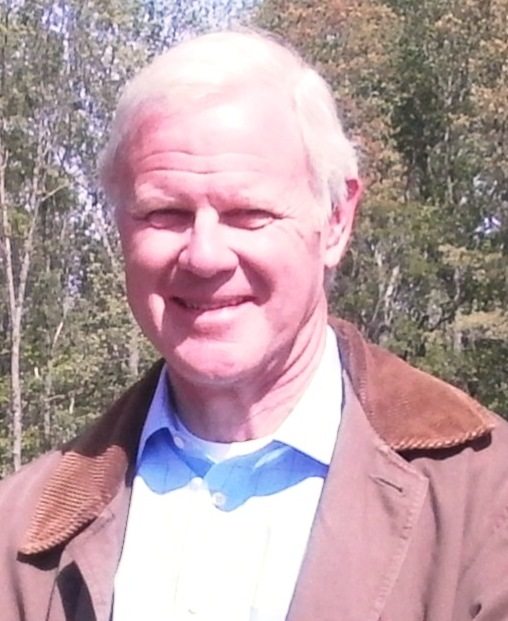

Candidate	Lee Ware	Randolph Critzer Jr.
Party	Republican	Democratic
Popular vote	27,963	16,380
Percentage	61.59%	36.08%
State delegate before election
Lee Ware
Republican
State delegate after election
Lee Ware
Republican

House District 72 contains all of Amelia County, Nottoway County, and Powhatan County, as well as portions of Chesterfield County. Incumbent delegate is Republican Lee Ware, who was first elected in 1998.

=== Republican primary ===
==== Nominee ====
- Lee Ware, incumbent

=== Democratic primary ===
==== Nominee ====
- Randolph Critzer Jr., attorney

==== Eliminated in primary ====
- Bilal Raychouni, teacher and nominee for this seat in 2023

==== Results ====
2025 Virginia's 72nd House of Delegates district Democratic primary
Party	Candidate	Votes	%
Democratic	Randolph Critzer Jr.	2,773	60.73%
Democratic	Bilal Raychouni	1,793	39.27%
Total votes		4,566	100.00%

=== Forward primary ===
==== Nominee ====
- Kristin Farry, engineer

=== General election ===
Predictions

Source	Ranking	As of
State Navigate	Solid R	August 15, 2025

==== Results ====
2025 Virginia 72nd House of Delegates District general election
Party	Candidate	Votes	%
Republican	Lee Ware (incumbent)	27,963	61.59%
Democratic	Randolph Critzer Jr.	16,380	36.08%
Forward	Kristin Farry	853	1.88%
Write-in		203	0.45%
Total votes		45,399	100.00%
Republican hold			

== District 73 ==
2025 Virginia House of Delegates District 73 election

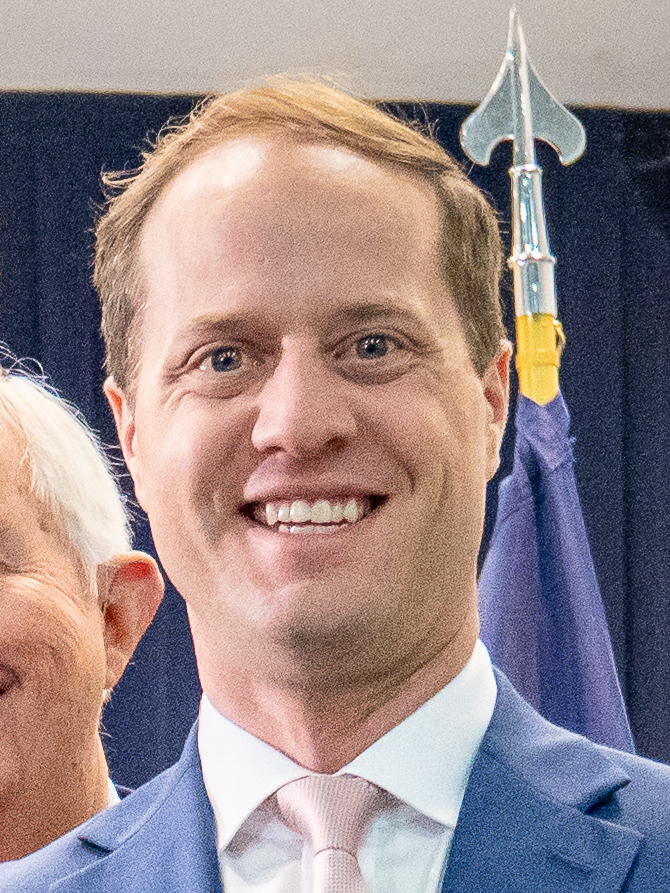
Candidate	Leslie Mehta	Mark Earley Jr.
Party	Democratic	Republican
Popular vote	26,122	24,275
Percentage	51.78%	48.12%
State delegate before election
Mark Earley Jr.
Republican
State delegate after election
Leslie Mehta
Democratic

House District 73 contains portions of Chesterfield County. Incumbent delegate is Republican Mark Earley Jr., who was first elected in 2023. The district is one of seven Republican-held districts won by Democratic Vice President Kamala Harris in the 2024 United States presidential election.

=== Republican primary ===
==== Nominee ====
- Mark Earley Jr., incumbent

=== Democratic primary ===
==== Nominee ====
- Leslie Mehta, civil rights attorney and nominee for VA-1 in 2024

==== Eliminated in primary ====
- Justin Woodford, consultant

==== Endorsements ====
Leslie Mehta

Organizations

- EMILYs List

==== Results ====
2025 Virginia's 73rd House of Delegates district Democratic primary
Party	Candidate	Votes	%
Democratic	Leslie Mehta	5,176	76.57%
Democratic	Justin Woodford	1,584	23.43%
Total votes		6,760	100.00%

=== General election ===
==== Endorsements ====
Mark Earley Jr. (R)

Organizations

- Americans for Prosperity

Predictions

Source	Ranking	As of
State Navigate	Tilt R	November 3, 2025

==== Results ====
2025 Virginia 73rd House of Delegates District general election
Party	Candidate	Votes	%
Democratic	Leslie Mehta	26,122	51.78%
Republican	Mark Earley Jr. (incumbent)	24,275	48.12%
Write-in		54	0.11%
Total votes		50,451	100.00%
Democratic gain from Republican			

== District 74 ==
2025 Virginia House of Delegates District 74 election
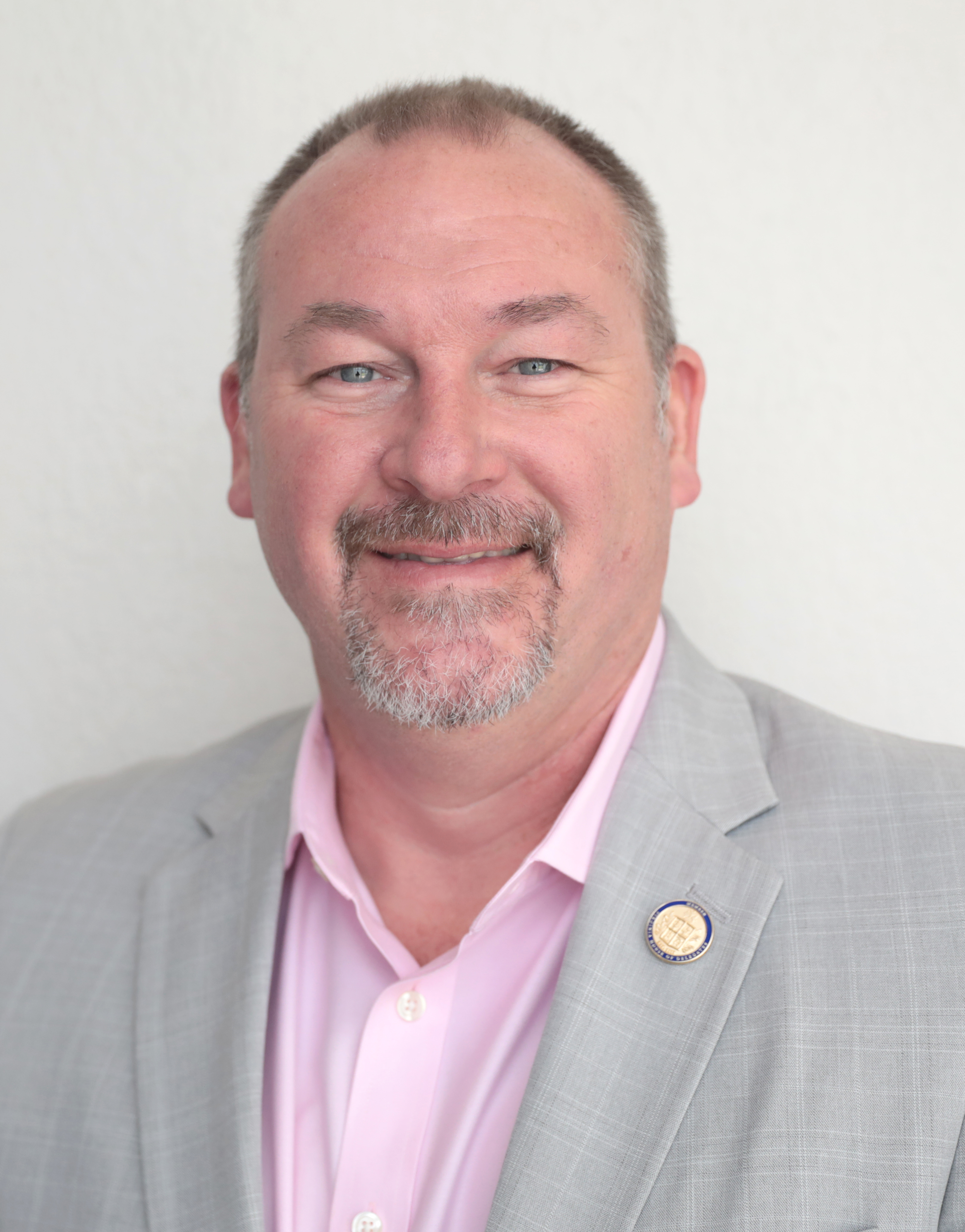

Candidate	Mike Cherry	Jonas Eppert
Party	Republican	Democratic
Popular vote	20,822	18,818
Percentage	52.40%	47.36%
State delegate before election
Mike Cherry
Republican
State delegate after election
Mike Cherry
Republican

House District 74 contains the entire city of Colonial Heights and portions of Chesterfield County. Incumbent delegate is Republican Mike Cherry, who was first elected in 2021.

=== Republican primary ===
==== Nominee ====
- Mike Cherry, incumbent

=== Democratic primary ===
==== Nominee ====
- Jonas Eppert, environmental coordinator

=== General election ===
Predictions

Source	Ranking	As of
State Navigate	Likely R	August 15, 2025

==== Results ====
2025 Virginia 74th House of Delegates District general election
Party	Candidate	Votes	%
Republican	Mike Cherry (incumbent)	20,822	52.40%
Democratic	Jonas Eppert	18,818	47.36%
Write-in		96	0.24%
Total votes		39,736	100.00%
Republican hold			

== District 75 ==
2025 Virginia House of Delegates District 75 election

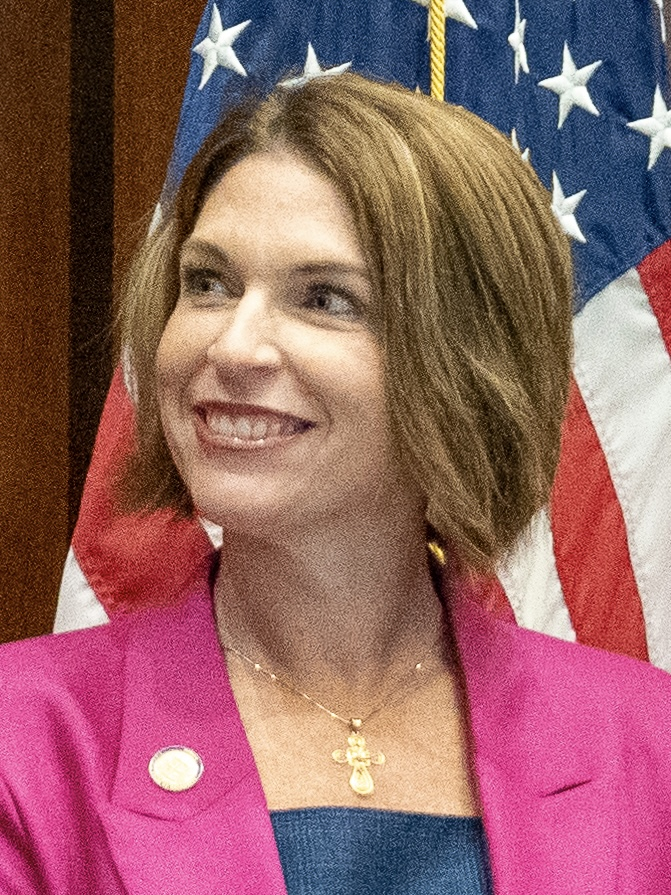
Candidate	Lindsey Dougherty	Carrie Coyner
Party	Democratic	Republican
Popular vote	15,231	13,472
Percentage	52.94%	46.82%
State delegate before election
Carrie Coyner
Republican
State delegate after election
Lindsey Dougherty
Democratic

House District 75 contains all of the city of Hopewell and portions of Chesterfield County and Prince George County. Incumbent delegate is Republican Carrie Coyner, who was first elected in 2019. The district is one of seven Republican-held districts won by Democratic Vice President Kamala Harris in the 2024 United States presidential election.

=== Republican primary ===
==== Nominee ====
- Carrie Coyner, incumbent

=== Democratic primary ===
==== Nominee ====
- Lindsey Dougherty, community advocate and nominee for HD-62 in 2019

==== Eliminated in primary ====
- Stephen Miller-Pitts, adjunct professor at Virginia State University, U.S. Army combat veteran and nominee for this seat in 2023
- Dustin Wade, nurse

==== Endorsements ====
Lindsey Dougherty

Organizations

- EMILYs List

==== Results ====
2025 Virginia's 75th House of Delegates district Democratic primary
Party	Candidate	Votes	%
Democratic	Lindsey Dougherty	2,367	44.81%
Democratic	Dustin Wade	1,715	32.47%
Democratic	Stephen Miller-Pitts	1,200	22.72%
Total votes		5,282	100.00%

=== General election ===
==== Endorsements ====
Carrie Coyner (R)

Organizations

- Americans for Prosperity

Predictions

Source	Ranking	As of
State Navigate	Lean D (flip)	August 15, 2025

==== Results ====
2025 Virginia 75th House of Delegates District general election
Party	Candidate	Votes	%
Democratic	Lindsey Dougherty	15,231	52.94%
Republican	Carrie Coyner (incumbent)	13,472	46.82%
Write-in		70	0.24%
Total votes		28,773	100.00%
Democratic gain from Republican			

== District 76 ==
2025 Virginia House of Delegates District 76 election
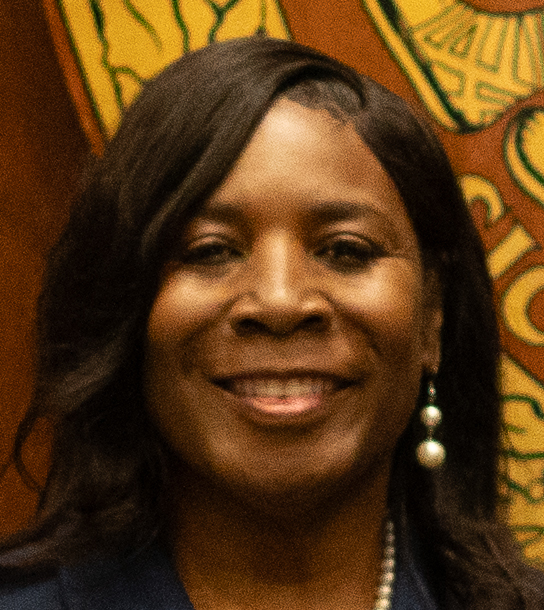

Candidate	Debra Gardner	John Thomas
Party	Democratic	Republican
Popular vote	23,248	10,552
Percentage	68.57%	31.13%
State delegate before election
Debra Gardner
Democratic
State delegate after election
Debra Gardner
Democratic

House District 76 contains portions of Chesterfield County. Incumbent delegate is Democrat Debra Gardner, who was first elected in 2023.

=== Democratic primary ===
==== Nominee ====
- Debra Gardner, incumbent

=== Republican primary ===
==== Nominee ====
- John Thomas, former ATF employee

=== General election ===
Predictions

Source	Ranking	As of
State Navigate	Safe D	August 15, 2025

==== Results ====
2025 Virginia 76th House of Delegates District general election
Party	Candidate	Votes	%
Democratic	Debra Gardner (incumbent)	23,248	68.57%
Republican	John Thomas	10,552	31.13%
Write-in		102	0.30%
Total votes		33,902	100.00%
Democratic hold			

== District 77 ==
2025 Virginia House of Delegates District 77 election
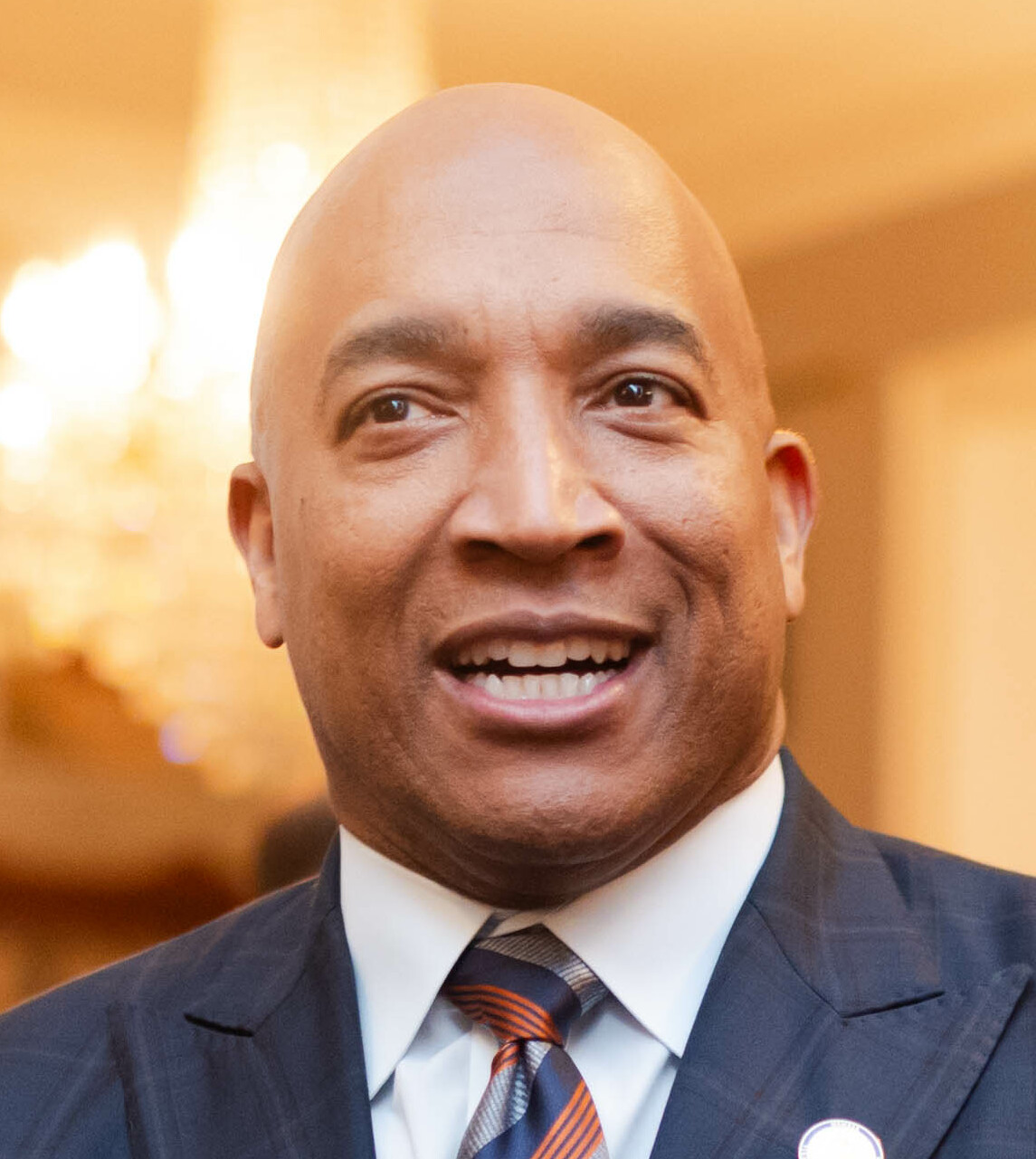

Candidate	Michael Jones	Richard Stonage Jr.
Party	Democratic	Republican
Popular vote	23,702	6,464
Percentage	78.43%	21.39%
State delegate before election
Michael Jones
Democratic
State delegate after election
Michael Jones
Democratic

House District 77 contains portions of the city of Richmond and Chesterfield County. The incumbent delegate is Democrat Michael Jones who was first elected in 2023.

=== Democratic primary ===
==== Nominee ====
- Michael Jones, incumbent

=== Republican primary ===
==== Nominee ====
- Richard Stonage Jr., engineer

=== General election ===
Predictions

Source	Ranking	As of
State Navigate	Safe D	August 15, 2025

==== Results ====
2025 Virginia 77th House of Delegates District general election
Party	Candidate	Votes	%
Democratic	Michael Jones (incumbent)	23,702	78.43%
Republican	Richard Stonage Jr.	6,464	21.39%
Write-in		56	0.19%
Total votes		30,222	100.00%
Democratic hold			

== District 78 ==
2025 Virginia House of Delegates District 78 election
Candidate	Betsy Carr	Richard Prado
Party	Democratic	Republican
Popular vote	35,901	8,545
Percentage	80.67%	19.20%
State delegate before election
Betsy Carr
Democratic
State delegate after election
Betsy Carr
Democratic

House District 78 contains portions of the city of Richmond. Incumbent delegate is Democrat Betsy Carr, who was first elected in 2009.

=== Democratic primary ===
==== Nominee ====
- Betsy Carr, incumbent

=== Republican primary ===
==== Nominee ====
- Richard Prado, travel baseball recruit promoter

=== General election ===
Predictions

Source	Ranking	As of
State Navigate	Safe D	August 15, 2025

==== Results ====
2025 Virginia 78th House of Delegates District general election
Party	Candidate	Votes	%
Democratic	Betsy Carr (incumbent)	35,901	80.67%
Republican	Richard Prado	8,545	19.20%
Write-in		55	0.12%
Total votes		44,501	100.00%
Democratic hold			

== District 79 ==
2025 Virginia House of Delegates District 79 election
Candidate	Rae Cousins	Kelsey Linnehan
Party	Democratic	Republican
Popular vote	27,853	2,299
Percentage	92.20%	7.61%
State delegate before election
Rae Cousins
Democratic
State delegate after election
Rae Cousins
Democratic

House District 79 contains portions of the city of Richmond. Incumbent delegate is Democrat Rae Cousins, who was first elected in 2023.

=== Democratic primary ===
==== Nominee ====
- Rae Cousins, incumbent

=== Republican primary ===
==== Nominee ====
- Kelsey Linnehan, former international trade attorney

=== General election ===
Predictions

Source	Ranking	As of
State Navigate	Safe D	August 15, 2025

==== Results ====
2025 Virginia 79th House of Delegates District general election
Party	Candidate	Votes	%
Democratic	Rae Cousins (incumbent)	27,853	92.20%
Republican	Kelsey Linnehan	2,299	7.61%
Write-in		57	0.19%
Total votes		30,209	100.00%
Democratic hold			

== District 80 ==
2025 Virginia House of Delegates District 80 election
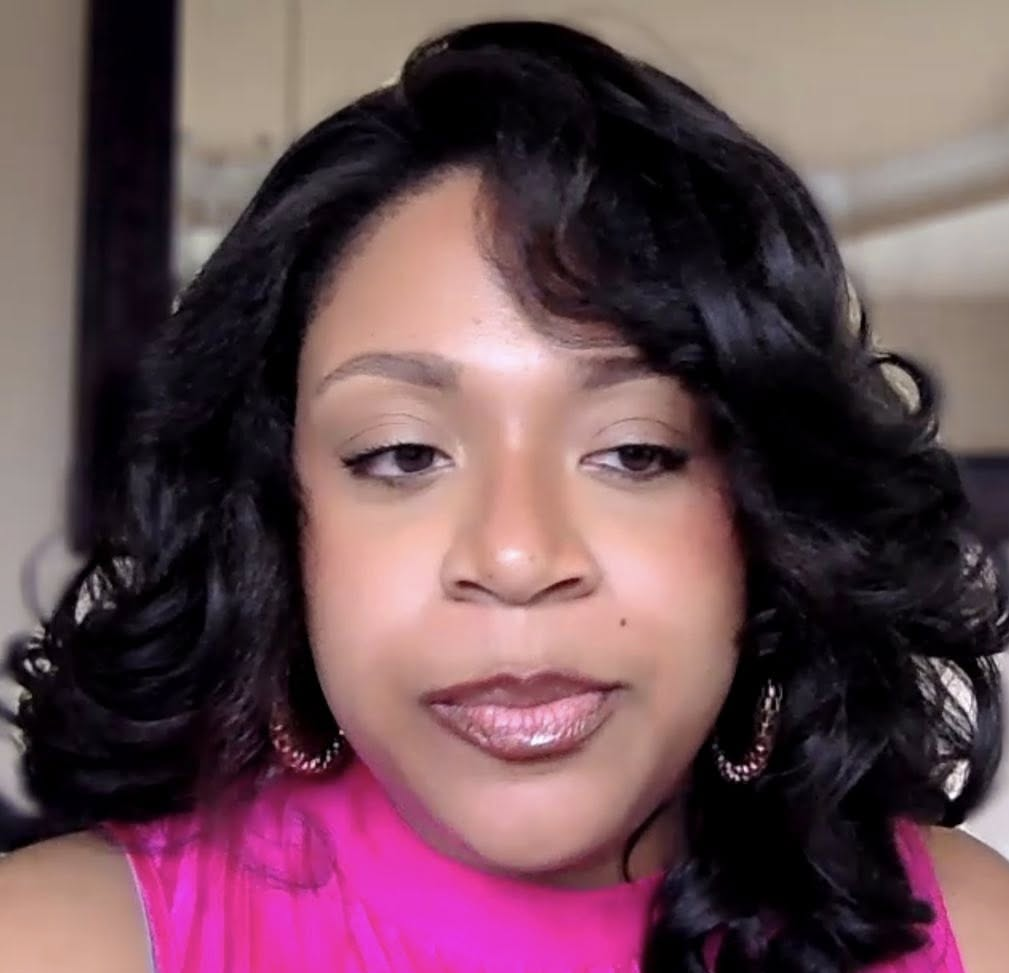
Candidate	Destiny LeVere Bolling
Party	Democratic
Popular vote	28,751
Percentage	94.99%
State delegate before election
Destiny LeVere Bolling
Democratic
State delegate after election
Destiny LeVere Bolling
Democratic

House District 80 contains portions of Henrico County. Incumbent delegate is Democrat Destiny LeVere Bolling, who was first elected in 2023.

=== Democratic primary ===
==== Nominee ====
- Destiny LeVere Bolling, incumbent

=== General election ===
Predictions

Source	Ranking	As of
State Navigate	Safe D	August 15, 2025

==== Results ====
2025 Virginia 80th House of Delegates District general election
Party	Candidate	Votes	%
Democratic	Destiny LeVere Bolling (incumbent)	28,751	94.99%
Write-in		1,516	5.01%
Total votes		30,267	100.00%
Democratic hold			

== District 81 ==
2025 Virginia House of Delegates District 81 election
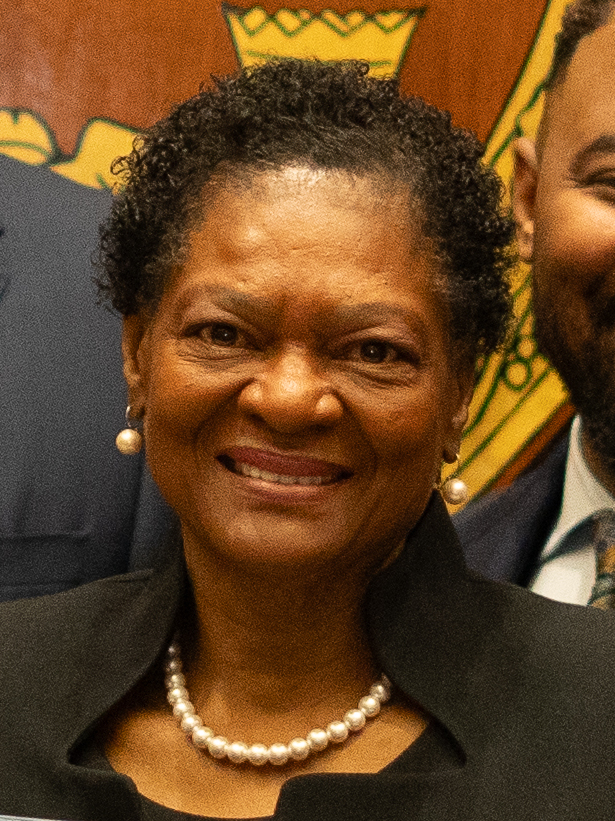
Candidate	Delores McQuinn
Party	Democratic
Popular vote	26,747
Percentage	92.66%
State delegate before election
Delores McQuinn
Democratic
State delegate after election
Delores McQuinn
Democratic

House District 81 contains all of Charles City County and portions of Henrico County and Chesterfield County. Incumbent delegate is Democrat Delores McQuinn, who was first elected in 2009.

=== Democratic primary ===
==== Nominee ====
- Delores McQuinn, incumbent

==== Eliminated in primary ====
- Alicia Atkins, member of the Henrico County School Board

==== Results ====
2025 Virginia's 81st House of Delegates district Democratic primary
Party	Candidate	Votes	%
Democratic	Delores McQuinn (incumbent)	6,601	76.0%
Democratic	Alicia Atkins	2,084	24.0%
Total votes		8,685	100.00%

=== General election ===
Predictions

Source	Ranking	As of
State Navigate	Safe D	August 15, 2025

==== Results ====
2025 Virginia 81st House of Delegates District general election
Party	Candidate	Votes	%
Democratic	Delores McQuinn (incumbent)	26,747	92.66%
Write-in		2,120	7.34%
Total votes		28,867	100.00%
Democratic hold			

== District 82 ==
2025 Virginia House of Delegates District 82 election

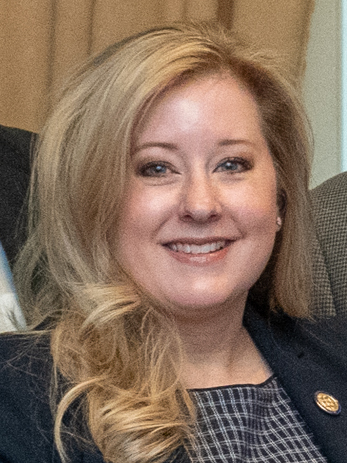
Candidate	Kimberly Pope Adams	Kim Taylor
Party	Democratic	Republican
Popular vote	18,529	15,848
Percentage	53.84%	46.05%
State delegate before election
Kim Taylor
Republican
State delegate after election
Kimberly Pope Adams
Democratic

House District 82 contains the entire of the city of Petersburg and Surry County. as well as portions of Dinwiddie County and Prince George County. Incumbent delegate is Republican Kim Taylor, who was first elected in 2021. The district is one of seven Republican-held districts won by Democratic Vice President Kamala Harris in the 2024 United States presidential election.

=== Republican primary ===
==== Nominee ====
- Kim Taylor, incumbent

=== Democratic primary ===
==== Nominee ====
- Kimberly Pope Adams, auditor and nominee for this seat in 2023

=== General election ===
==== Endorsements ====
Kim Taylor (R)

Organizations

- Americans for Prosperity
Kimberly Pope Adams (D)

Organizations

- EMILYs List

Predictions

Source	Ranking	As of
State Navigate	Likely D (flip)	August 15, 2025

==== Results ====
2025 Virginia 82nd House of Delegates District general election
Party	Candidate	Votes	%
Democratic	Kimberly Pope Adams	18,529	53.84%
Republican	Kim Taylor (incumbent)	15,848	46.05%
Write-in		40	0.12%
Total votes		34,417	100.00%
Democratic gain from Republican			

== District 83 ==
2025 Virginia House of Delegates District 83 election
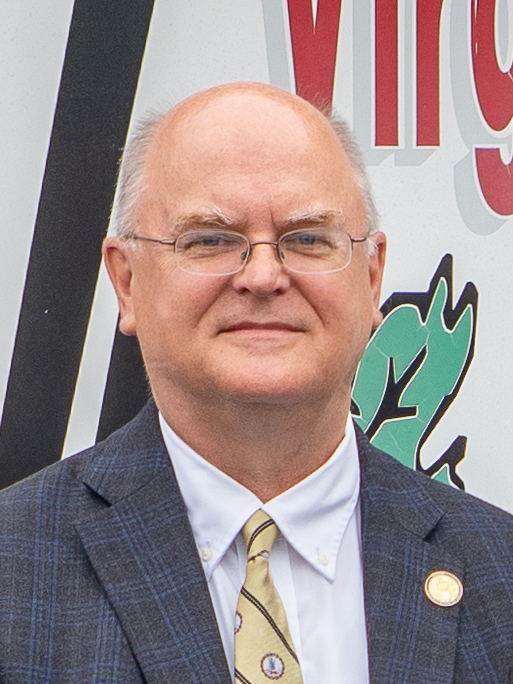

Candidate	Otto Wachsmann	Mary Person
Party	Republican	Democratic
Popular vote	20,163	16,821
Percentage	54.44%	45.42%
State delegate before election
Otto Wachsmann
Republican
State delegate after election
Otto Wachsmann
Republican

House District 83 contains all of the city of Emporia, Brunswick County, Greensville County, Southampton County, and Sussex County, as well as portions of Dinwiddie County and Isle of Wight County. Incumbent delegate is Republican Otto Wachsmann, who was first elected in 2021.

=== Republican primary ===
==== Nominee ====
- Otto Wachsmann, incumbent

=== Democratic primary ===
==== Nominee ====
- Mary Person, elementary school administrator and nominee for this seat in 2023

=== General election ===
Predictions

Source	Ranking	As of
State Navigate	Likely R	August 15, 2025

==== Results ====
2025 Virginia 83rd House of Delegates District general election
Party	Candidate	Votes	%
Republican	Otto Wachsmann (incumbent)	20,163	54.44%
Democratic	Mary Person	16,821	45.42%
Write-in		52	0.14%
Total votes		37,036	100.00%
Republican hold			

== District 84 ==
2025 Virginia House of Delegates District 84 election
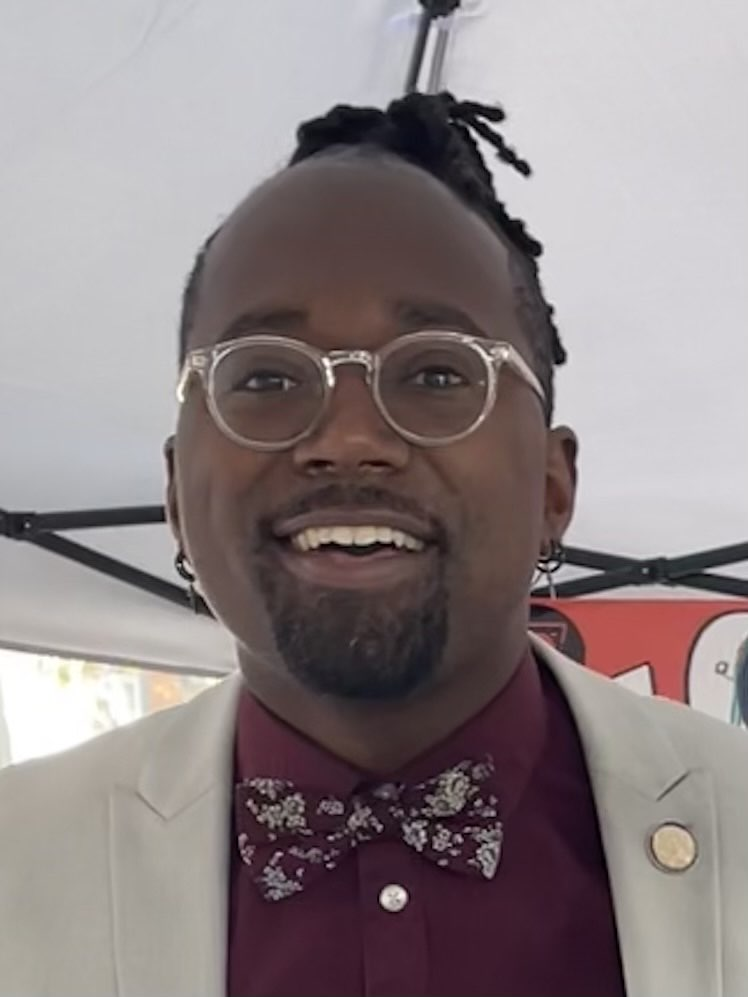

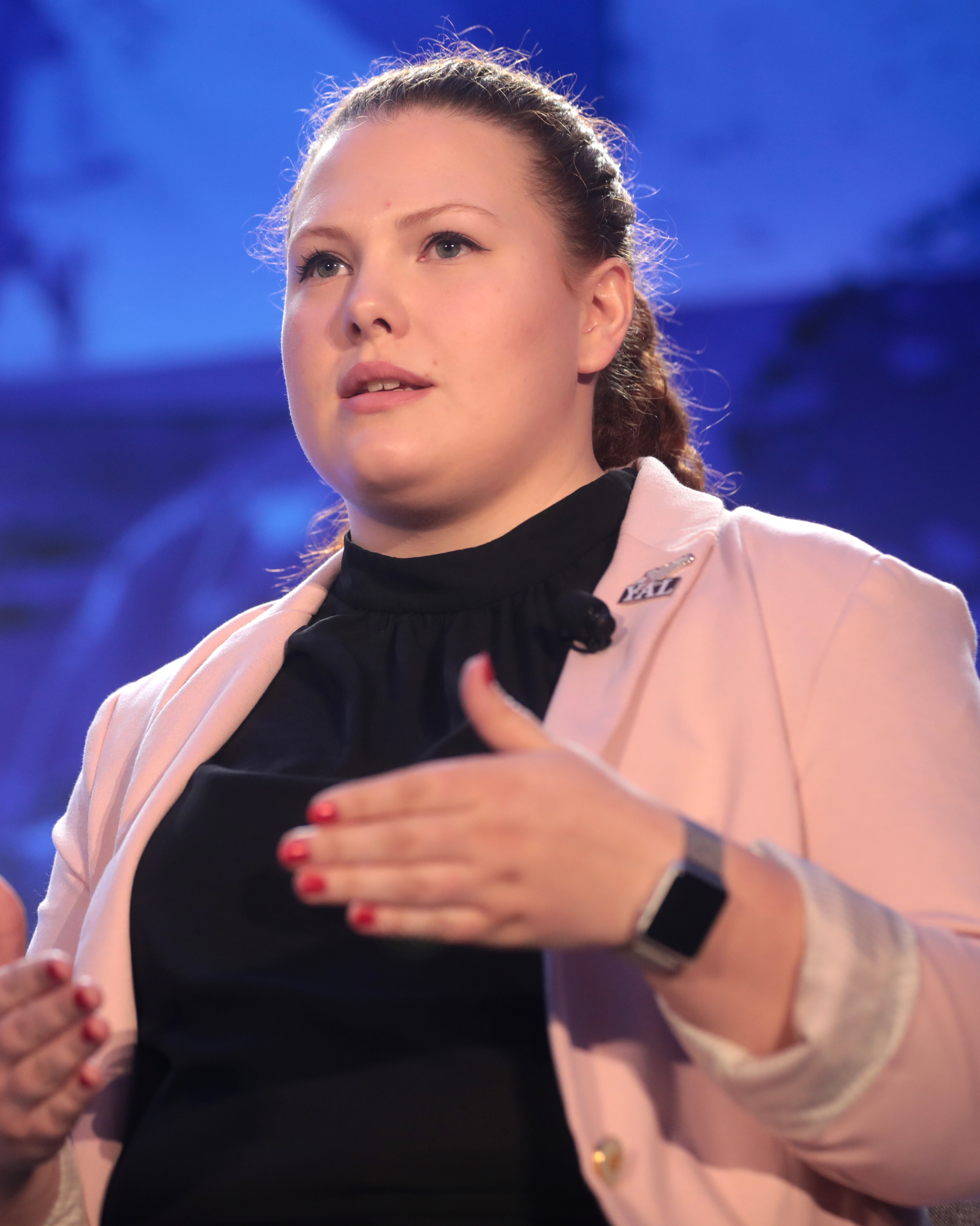
Candidate	Nadarius Clark	Felisha Storm
Party	Democratic	Republican
Popular vote	23,034	15,192
Percentage	60.19%	39.70%
State delegate before election
Nadarius Clark
Democratic
State delegate after election
Nadarius Clark
Democratic

House District 84 contains all of the city of Franklin, as well as portions of the city of Suffolk and Isle of Wight County. Incumbent delegate is Democrat Nadarius Clark, who was first elected in 2021.

=== Democratic primary ===
==== Nominee ====
- Nadarius Clark, incumbent

=== Republican primary ===
==== Nominee ====
- Felisha Storm, Virginia Director of Grassroots Operations for Americans for Prosperity and former Vermont state representative (2019–2023)

=== General election ===
Predictions

Source	Ranking	As of
State Navigate	Likely D	August 15, 2025

==== Results ====
2025 Virginia 84th House of Delegates District general election
Party	Candidate	Votes	%
Democratic	Nadarius Clark (incumbent)	23,034	60.19%
Republican	Felisha Storm	15,192	39.70%
Write-in		44	0.11%
Total votes		38,270	100.00%
Democratic hold			

== District 85 ==
2025 Virginia House of Delegates District 85 election
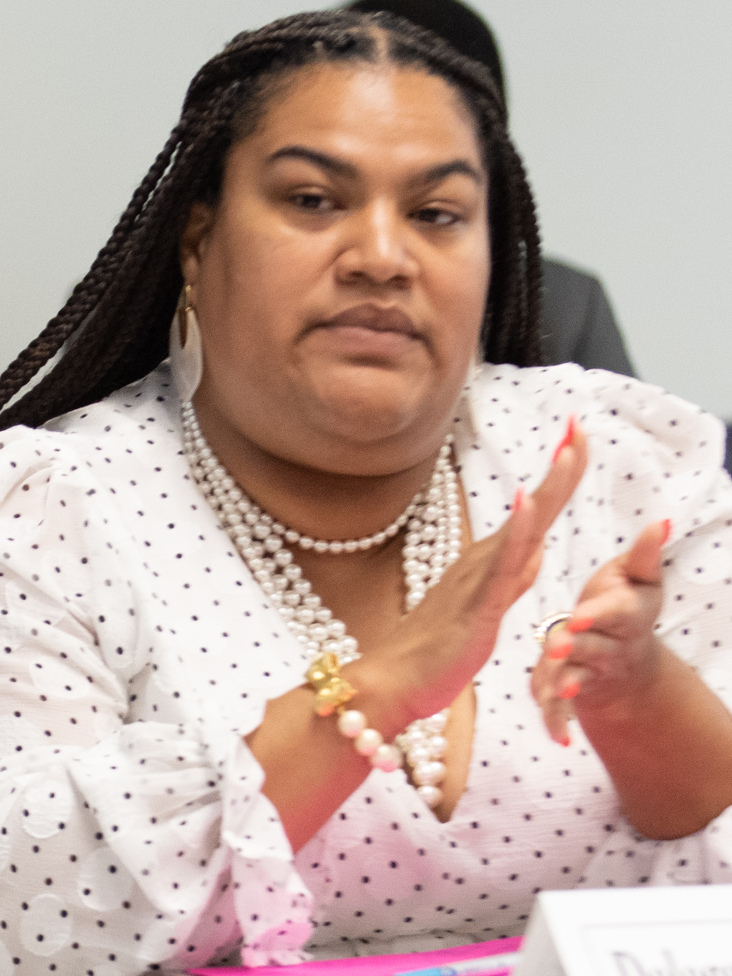
Candidate	Cia Price
Party	Democratic
Popular vote	19,956
Percentage	94.94%
State delegate before election
Marcia Price
Democratic
State delegate after election
Marcia Price
Democratic

House District 85 contains portions of the city of Newport News. Incumbent delegate is Democrat Cia Price, who was first elected in 2015.

=== Democratic primary ===
==== Nominee ====
- Cia Price, incumbent

=== General election ===
Predictions

Source	Ranking	As of
State Navigate	Safe D	August 15, 2025

==== Results ====
2025 Virginia 85th House of Delegates District general election
Party	Candidate	Votes	%
Democratic	Cia Price (incumbent)	19,956	94.94%
Write-in		1,064	5.06%
Total votes		21,020	100.00%
Democratic hold			

== District 86 ==
2025 Virginia House of Delegates District 86 election

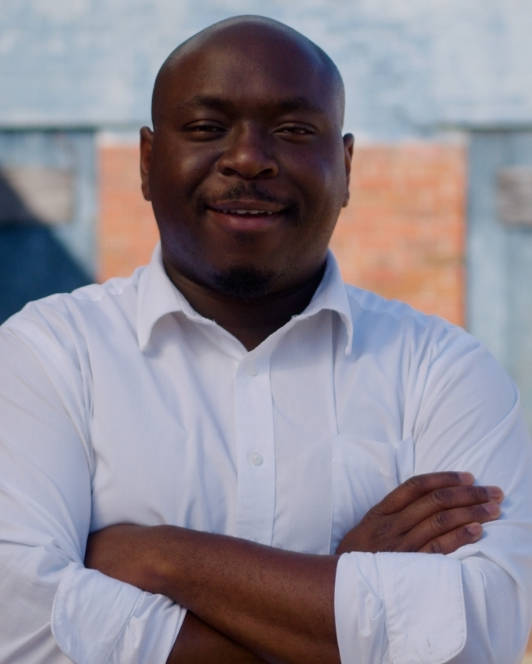
Candidate	Virgil Thornton Sr.	A.C. Cordoza
Party	Democratic	Republican
Popular vote	17,081	14,563
Percentage	53.85%	45.91%
State delegate before election
A.C. Cordoza
Republican
State delegate after election
Virgil Thornton Sr.
Democratic

House District 86 contains the entire city of Poquoson, as well as portions of the city of Hampton and York County. Incumbent delegate is Republican A.C. Cordoza, who was first elected in 2021.

=== Republican primary ===
==== Nominee ====
- A.C. Cordoza, incumbent

=== Democratic primary ===
==== Nominee ====
- Virgil Thornton Sr., car salesman

=== General election ===
Predictions

Source	Ranking	As of
State Navigate	Tilt D (flip)	October 15, 2025

=== Polling ===
Poll source	Date(s) administered	Sample size (Note: Key: A – all adults RV – registered voters LV – likely voters V – unclear)	Margin of error	Cordoza (R)	Thornton Sr. (D)	Other	Undecided
State Navigate	October 17–18, 2025	325 (LV)	± 5.4%	46%	52%	-	2%

==== Results ====
2025 Virginia 86th House of Delegates District general election
Party	Candidate	Votes	%
Democratic	Virgil Thornton Sr.	17,081	53.85%
Republican	A.C. Cordoza (incumbent)	14,563	45.91%
Write-in		75	0.24%
Total votes		31,719	100.00%
Democratic gain from Republican			

== District 87 ==
2025 Virginia House of Delegates District 87 election
Candidate	Jeion Ward	John Chapman
Party	Democratic	Republican
Popular vote	23,342	5,930
Percentage	79.46%	20.19%
State delegate before election
Jeion Ward
Democratic
State delegate after election
Jeion Ward
Democratic

House District 87 contains portions of the city of Hampton. Incumbent delegate is Democrat Jeion Ward, who was first elected in 2003.

=== Democratic primary ===
==== Nominee ====
- Jeion Ward, incumbent

=== Republican primary ===
==== Nominee ====
- John Chapman, trucking trainer and supervisor and nominee for this seat in 2023

=== General election ===
Predictions

Source	Ranking	As of
State Navigate	Safe D	August 15, 2025

==== Results ====
2025 Virginia 87th House of Delegates District general election
Party	Candidate	Votes	%
Democratic	Jeion Ward (incumbent)	23,342	79.46%
Republican	John Chapman	5,930	20.19%
Write-in		103	0.35%
Total votes		29,375	100.00%
Democratic hold			

== District 88 ==
2025 Virginia House of Delegates District 88 election
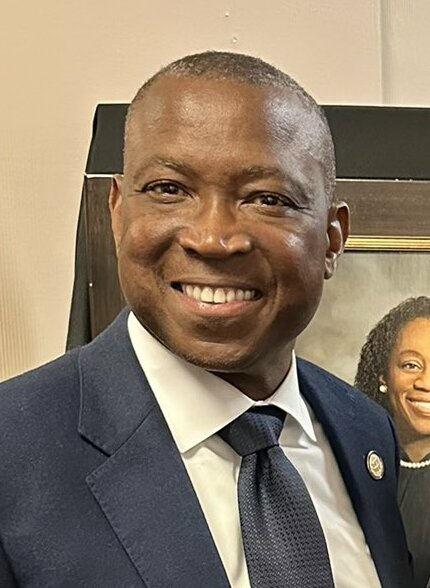
Candidate	Don Scott
Party	Democratic
Popular vote	21,768
Percentage	94.13%
State delegate before election
Don Scott
Democratic
State delegate after election
Don Scott
Democratic

House District 88 contains portions of the city of Portsmouth. Incumbent delegate is Democrat Don Scott, who was first elected in 2019.

=== Democratic primary ===
==== Nominee ====
- Don Scott, incumbent

=== General election ===
Predictions

Source	Ranking	As of
State Navigate	Safe D	August 15, 2025

==== Results ====
2025 Virginia 88th House of Delegates District general election
Party	Candidate	Votes	%
Democratic	Don Scott (incumbent)	21,768	94.13%
Write-in		1,357	5.87%
Total votes		23,125	100.00%
Democratic hold			

== District 89 ==
2025 Virginia House of Delegates District 89 election
Candidate	Kacey Carnegie	Mike Lamonea
Party	Democratic	Republican
Popular vote	20,582	17,036
Percentage	54.60%	45.19%
State delegate before election
Baxter Ennis
Republican
State delegate after election
Kacey Carnegie
Democratic

House District 89 contains portions of the cities of Chesapeake and Suffolk. The incumbent delegate is Republican Baxter Ennis, who was first elected in 2023 and is not seeking re-election. The district is one of seven Republican-held districts won by Democratic Vice President Kamala Harris in the 2024 United States presidential election.

=== Republican primary ===
==== Nominee ====
- Mike Lamonea, Chesapeake School Board member and former ICE special agent

==== Eliminated in primary ====
- Kristen Shannon, attorney

==== Declined ====
- Baxter Ennis, incumbent

==== Endorsements ====
Mike Lamonea

State legislators

- Baxter Ennis, incumbent delegate

Organizations

- Americans for Prosperity

==== Results ====
2025 Virginia's 89th House of Delegates district Republican primary
Party	Candidate	Votes	%
Republican	Mike Lamonea	2,537	66.14%
Republican	Kristen Shannon	1,299	33.86%
Total votes		3,836	100.00%

=== Democratic primary ===
==== Nominee ====
- Kacey Carnegie, lead attorney

==== Eliminated in primary ====
- Blaizen Bloom, businessperson and perennial candidate

==== Endorsements ====
Kacey Carnegie

Organizations

- EMILYs List

==== Results ====
2025 Virginia's 89th House of Delegates district Democratic primary
Party	Candidate	Votes	%
Democratic	Kacey Carnegie	4,514	77.61%
Democratic	Blaizen Bloom	1,302	22.39%
Total votes		5,816	100.00%

=== General election ===
Predictions

Source	Ranking	As of
State Navigate	Likely D (flip)	October 20, 2025

==== Results ====
2025 Virginia 89th House of Delegates District general election
Party	Candidate	Votes	%
Democratic	Kacey Carnegie	20,582	54.60%
Republican	Mike Lamonea	17,036	45.19%
Write-in		80	0.21%
Total votes		37,698	100.00%
Democratic gain from Republican			

== District 90 ==
2025 Virginia House of Delegates District 90 election
Candidate	Jay Leftwich	Rodney Nickens
Party	Republican	Democratic
Popular vote	23,070	15,749
Percentage	59.30%	40.48%
State delegate before election
Jay Leftwich
Republican
State delegate after election
Jay Leftwich
Republican

House District 90 contains portions of the city of Chesapeake. Incumbent delegate is Republican Jay Leftwich, who was first elected in 2013.

=== Republican primary ===
==== Nominee ====
- Jay Leftwich, incumbent

=== Democratic primary ===
==== Nominee ====
- Rodney Nickens, political consultant

=== General election ===
Predictions

Source	Ranking	As of
State Navigate	Solid R	August 15, 2025

==== Results ====
2025 Virginia 90th House of Delegates District general election
Party	Candidate	Votes	%
Republican	Jay Leftwich (incumbent)	23,070	59.30%
Democratic	Rodney Nickens	15,749	40.48%
Write-in		86	0.22%
Total votes		38,905	100.00%
Republican hold			

== District 91 ==
2025 Virginia House of Delegates District 91 election
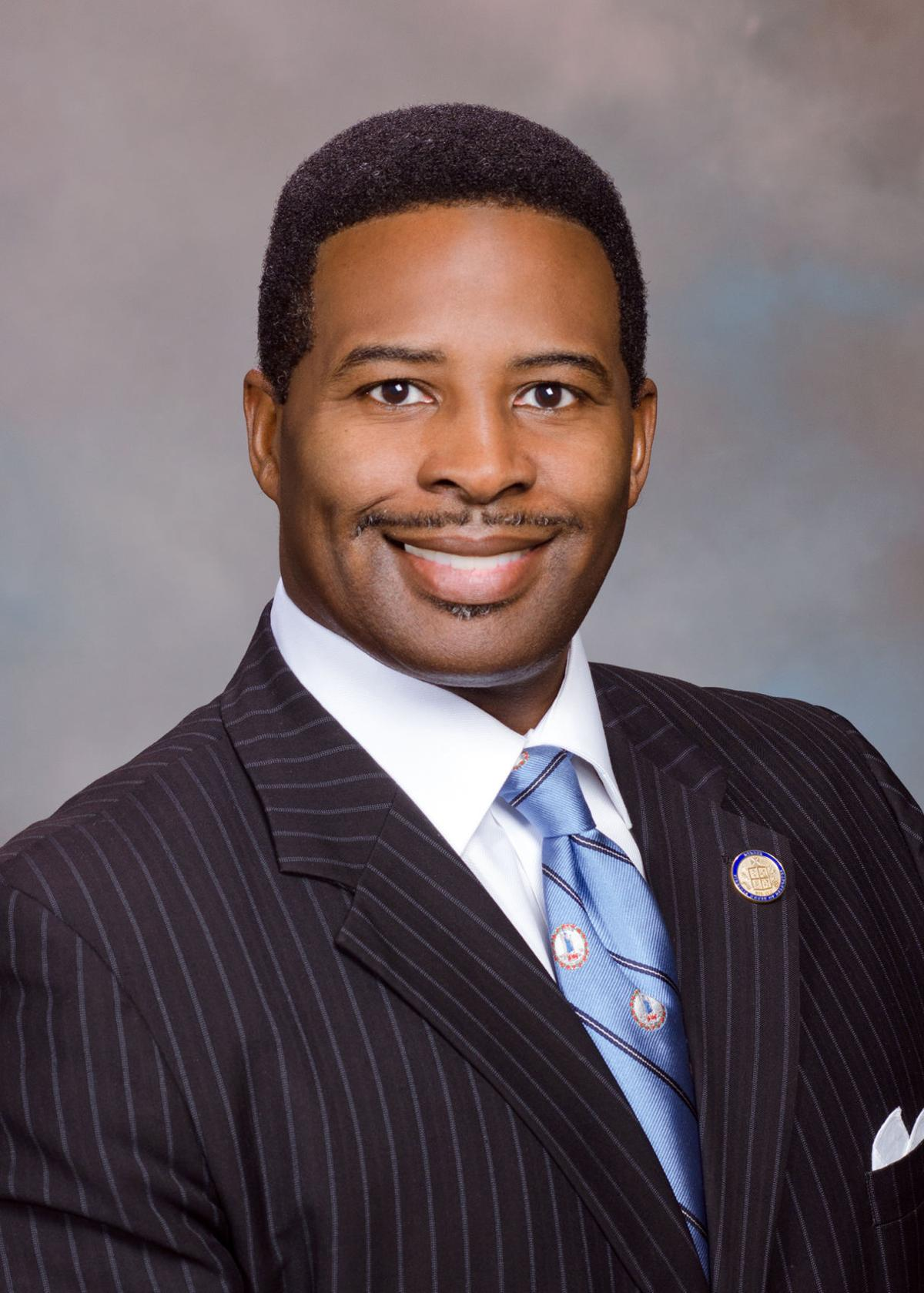
Candidate	Cliff Hayes Jr.
Party	Democratic
Popular vote	22,728
Percentage	92.72%
State delegate before election
Cliff Hayes Jr.
Democratic
State delegate after election
Cliff Hayes Jr.
Democratic

House District 91 contains portions of the cities of Chesapeake and Portsmouth. Incumbent delegate is Democrat Cliff Hayes Jr., who was first elected in 2016.

=== Democratic primary ===
==== Nominee ====
- Cliff Hayes Jr., incumbent

=== General election ===
Predictions

Source	Ranking	As of
State Navigate	Safe D	August 15, 2025

==== Results ====
2025 Virginia 91st House of Delegates District general election
Party	Candidate	Votes	%
Democratic	Cliff Hayes Jr. (incumbent)	22,728	92.72%
Write-in		1,784	7.28%
Total votes		24,512	100.00%
Democratic hold			

== District 92 ==
2025 Virginia House of Delegates District 92 election
Candidate	Bonita Anthony	Nash Bilisoly
Party	Democratic	Republican
Popular vote	19,546	4,706
Percentage	80.31%	19.34%
State delegate before election
Bonita Anthony
Democratic
State delegate after election
Bonita Anthony
Democratic

House District 92 contains portions of the cities of Chesapeake and Norfolk. Incumbent delegate is Democrat Bonita Anthony, who was first elected in 2023.

=== Democratic primary ===
==== Nominee ====
- Bonita Anthony, incumbent

=== Republican primary ===
==== Nominee ====
- Nash Bilisoly, consultant

=== General election ===
Predictions

Source	Ranking	As of
State Navigate	Safe D	August 15, 2025

==== Results ====
2025 Virginia 92nd House of Delegates District general election
Party	Candidate	Votes	%
Democratic	Bonita Anthony (incumbent)	19,546	80.31%
Republican	Nash Bilisoly	4,706	19.34%
Write-in		87	0.36%
Total votes		24,339	100.00%
Democratic hold			

== District 93 ==
2025 Virginia House of Delegates District 93 election
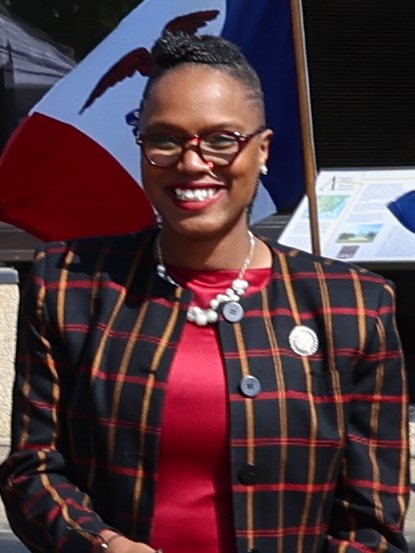
Candidate	Jackie Glass
Party	Democratic
Popular vote	21,417
Percentage	95.16%
State delegate before election
Jackie Glass
Democratic
State delegate after election
Jackie Glass
Democratic

House District 93 contains portions of the city of Norfolk. Incumbent delegate is Jackie Glass, who was first elected in 2022.

=== Democratic primary ===
==== Nominee ====
- Jackie Glass, incumbent

=== General election ===
Predictions

Source	Ranking	As of
State Navigate	Safe D	August 15, 2025

==== Results ====
2025 Virginia 93rd House of Delegates District general election
Party	Candidate	Votes	%
Democratic	Jackie Glass (incumbent)	21,417	95.16%
Write-in		1,089	4.84%
Total votes		22,506	100.00%
Democratic hold			

== District 94 ==
2025 Virginia House of Delegates District 94 election
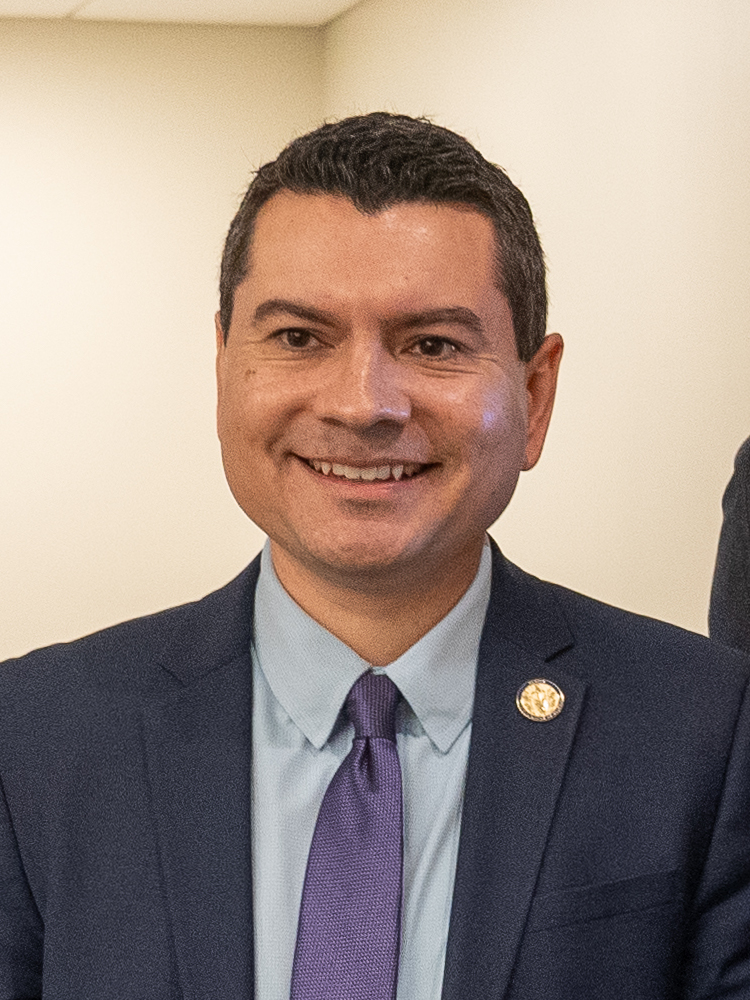

Candidate	Phil Hernandez	Andy Pittman
Party	Democratic	Republican
Popular vote	11,600	7,311
Percentage	61.26%	38.61%
State delegate before election
Phil Hernandez
Democratic
State delegate after election
Phil Hernandez
Democratic

House District 94 contains portions of the city of Norfolk. Incumbent delegate is Democrat Phil Hernandez, who was first elected in 2023.

=== Democratic primary ===
==== Nominee ====
- Phil Hernandez, incumbent

=== Republican primary ===
==== Nominee ====
- Andy Pittman, attorney and nominee for this seat in 2023

=== General election ===
Predictions

Source	Ranking	As of
State Navigate	Safe D	August 15, 2025

==== Results ====
2025 Virginia 94th House of Delegates District general election
Party	Candidate	Votes	%
Democratic	Phil Hernandez (incumbent)	11,600	61.26%
Republican	Andy Pittman	7,311	38.61%
Write-in		25	0.13%
Total votes		18,936	100.00%
Democratic hold			

== District 95 ==
2025 Virginia House of Delegates District 95 election
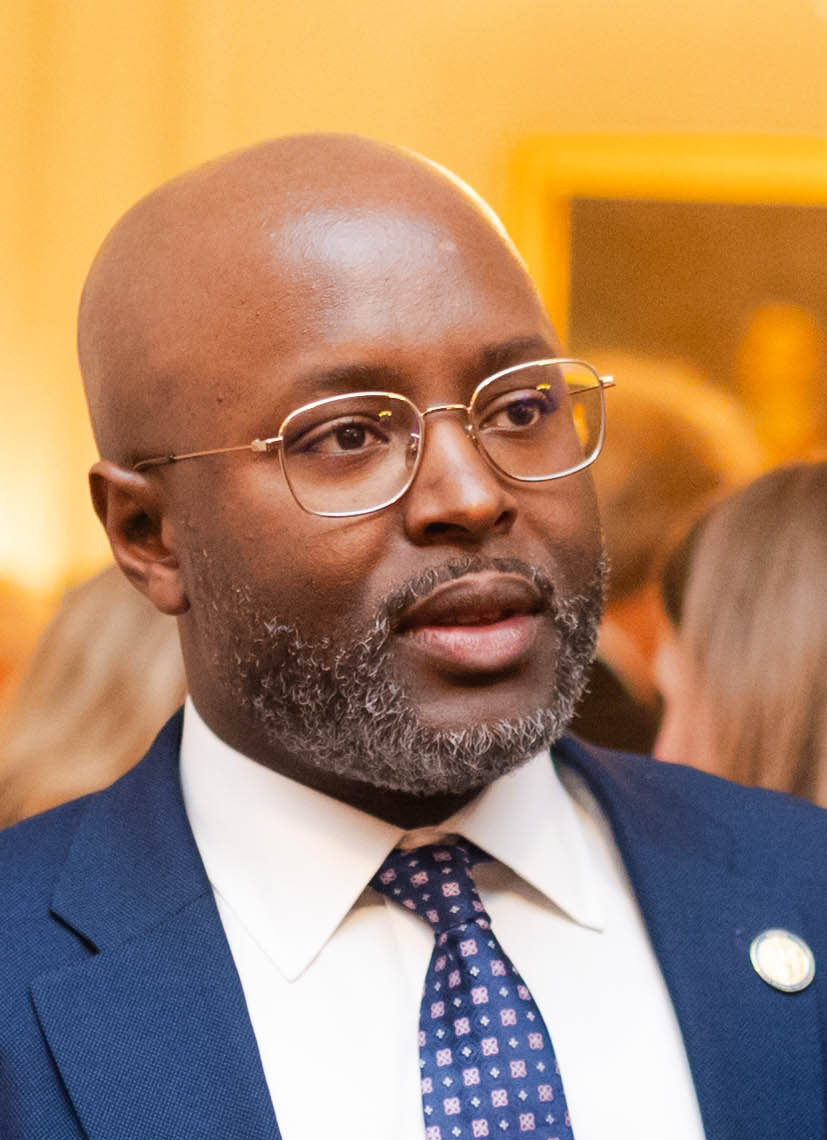
Candidate	Alex Askew
Party	Democratic
Popular vote	19,475
Percentage	93.18%
State delegate before election
Alex Askew
Democratic
State delegate after election
Alex Askew
Democratic

House District 95 contains portions of the cities of Norfolk and Virginia Beach. Incumbent delegate is Democrat Alex Askew, who was first elected in 2023.

=== Democratic primary ===
Predictions

Source	Ranking	As of
State Navigate	Safe D	August 15, 2025

==== Nominee ====
- Alex Askew, incumbent

=== General election ===
==== Results ====
2025 Virginia 95th House of Delegates District general election
Party	Candidate	Votes	%
Democratic	Alex Askew (incumbent)	19,475	93.18%
Write-in		1,425	6.82%
Total votes		20,900	100.00%
Democratic hold			

== District 96 ==
2025 Virginia House of Delegates District 96 election
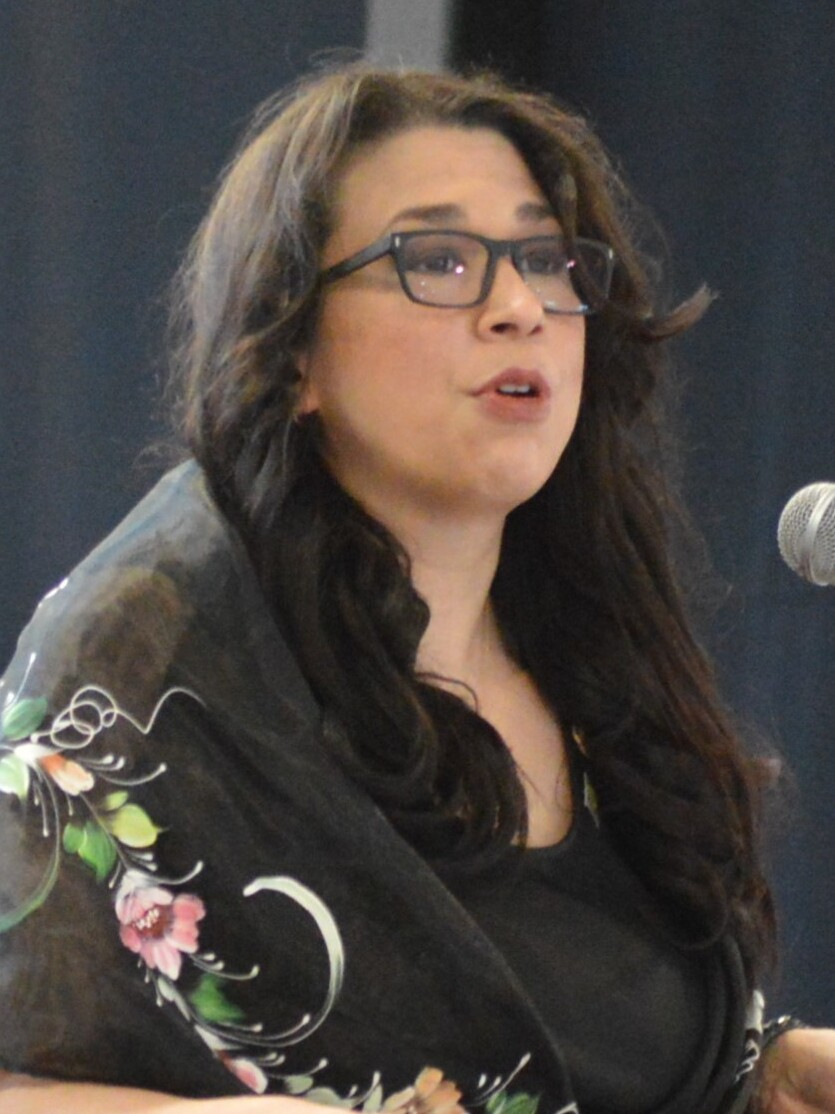

Candidate	Kelly Convirs-Fowler	Kyle Pasquarella
Party	Democratic	Republican
Popular vote	17,077	11,180
Percentage	60.28%	39.46%
State delegate before election
Kelly Convirs-Fowler
Democratic
State delegate after election
Kelly Convirs-Fowler
Democratic

House District contains portions of the city of Virginia Beach. incumbent delegate is Democrat Kelly Convirs-Fowler, who was first elected in 2017.

=== Democratic primary ===
==== Nominee ====
- Kelly Convirs-Fowler, incumbent

=== Republican primary ===
==== Nominee ====
- Kyle Pasquarella, U.S. Navy veteran

=== General election ===
Predictions

Source	Ranking	As of
State Navigate	Safe D	August 15, 2025

==== Results ====
2025 Virginia 96th House of Delegates District general election
Party	Candidate	Votes	%
Democratic	Kelly Convirs-Fowler (incumbent)	17,077	60.28%
Republican	Kyle Pasquarella	11,180	39.46%
Write-in		72	0.25%
Total votes		28,329	100.00%
Democratic hold			

== District 97 ==
2025 Virginia House of Delegates District 97 election
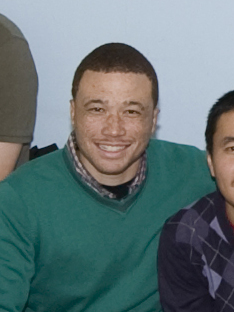

Candidate	Michael Feggans	Tim Anderson
Party	Democratic	Republican
Popular vote	17,496	12,926
Percentage	57.41%	42.41%
State delegate before election
Michael Feggans
Democratic
State delegate after election
Michael Feggans
Democratic

House District 97 contains portions of the city of Virginia Beach. Incumbent delegate is Democrat Michael Feggans, who was first elected in 2023.

=== Democratic primary ===
==== Nominee ====
- Michael Feggans, incumbent

=== Republican primary ===
==== Nominee ====
- Tim Anderson, former state delegate from the 83rd district (2022–2023) and candidate for SD-19 in 2023

==== Eliminated in primary ====
- Christina Felder, teacher and candidate for Virginia Beach City Council in 2024

==== Results ====
2025 Virginia's 97th House of Delegates district Republican primary
Party	Candidate	Votes	%
Republican	Tim Anderson	1,826	91.76%
Republican	Christina Felder	164	8.24%
Total votes		1,990	100.00%

=== General election ===
Predictions

Source	Ranking	As of
State Navigate	Likely D	August 15, 2025

==== Results ====
2025 Virginia 97th House of Delegates District general election
Party	Candidate	Votes	%
Democratic	Michael Feggans (incumbent)	17,496	57.41%
Republican	Tim Anderson	12,926	42.41%
Write-in		54	0.18%
Total votes		30,476	100.00%
Democratic hold			

== District 98 ==
2025 Virginia House of Delegates District 98 election
Candidate	Barry Knight	Cheryl Smith
Party	Republican	Democratic
Popular vote	20,209	15,414
Percentage	56.64%	43.20%
State delegate before election
Barry Knight
Republican
State delegate after election
Barry Knight
Republican

House District 98 contains portions of the city of Virginia Beach. Incumbent delegate is Republican Barry Knight, who was first elected in 2008.

=== Republican primary ===
==== Nominee ====
- Barry Knight, incumbent

=== Democratic primary ===
==== Nominee ====
- Cheryl Smith, retired teacher

=== General election ===
Predictions

Source	Ranking	As of
State Navigate	Solid R	August 15, 2025

==== Results ====
2025 Virginia 98th House of Delegates District general election
Party	Candidate	Votes	%
Republican	Barry Knight (incumbent)	20,209	56.64%
Democratic	Cheryl Smith	15,414	43.20%
Write-in		55	0.15%
Total votes		35,678	100.00%
Republican hold			

== District 99 ==
2025 Virginia House of Delegates District 99 election
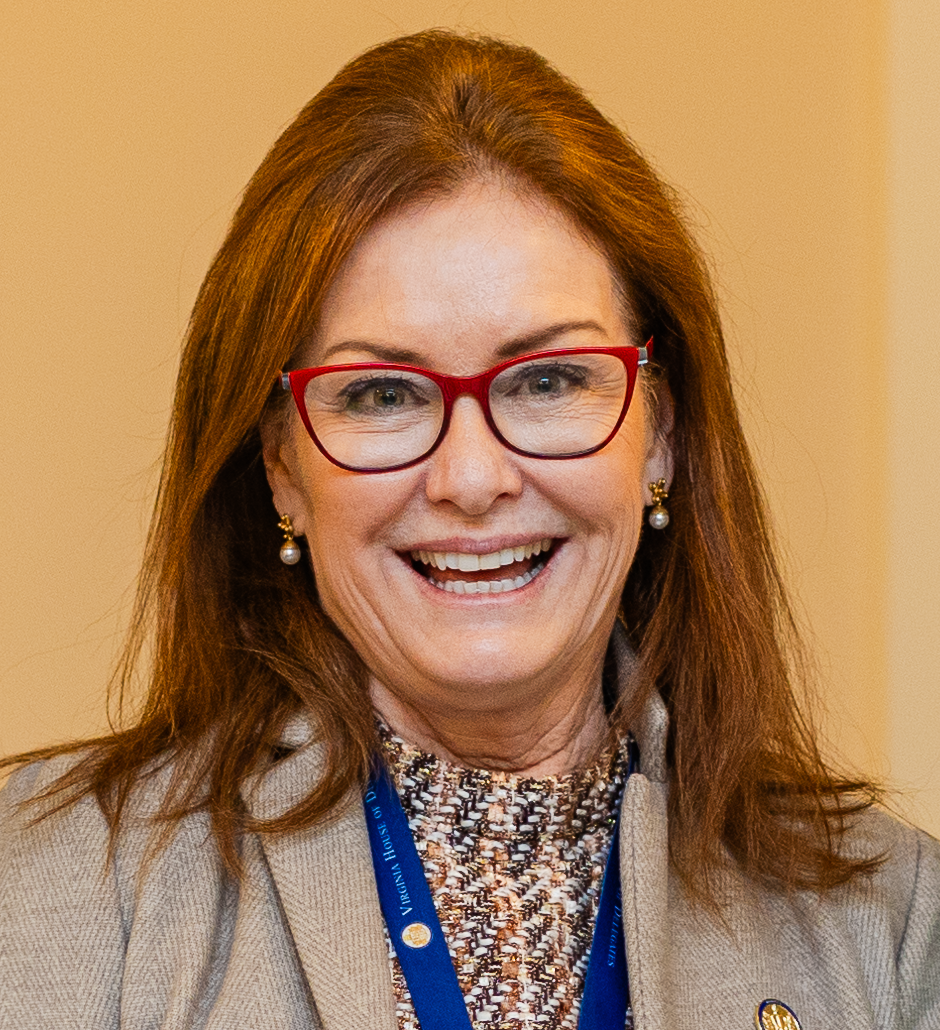

Candidate	Anne Ferrell Tata	Cat Porterfield
Party	Republican	Democratic
Popular vote	19,081	16,279
Percentage	53.88%	45.97%
State delegate before election
Anne Ferrell Tata
Republican
State delegate after election
Anne Ferrell Tata
Republican

House District 99 contains portions of the city of Virginia Beach. Incumbent delegate is Republican Anne Ferrell Tata, who was first elected in 2021.

=== Republican primary ===
==== Nominee ====
- Anne Ferrell Tata, incumbent

=== Democratic primary ===
==== Nominee ====
- Cat Porterfield, journalist and nominee for this seat in 2023

=== General election ===
Predictions

Source	Ranking	As of
State Navigate	Likely R	August 15, 2025

==== Results ====
2025 Virginia 99th House of Delegates District general election
Party	Candidate	Votes	%
Republican	Anne Ferrell Tata (incumbent)	19,081	53.88%
Democratic	Cat Porterfield	16,279	45.97%
Write-in		51	0.14%
Total votes		35,411	100.00%
Republican hold			

== District 100 ==
2025 Virginia House of Delegates District 100 election
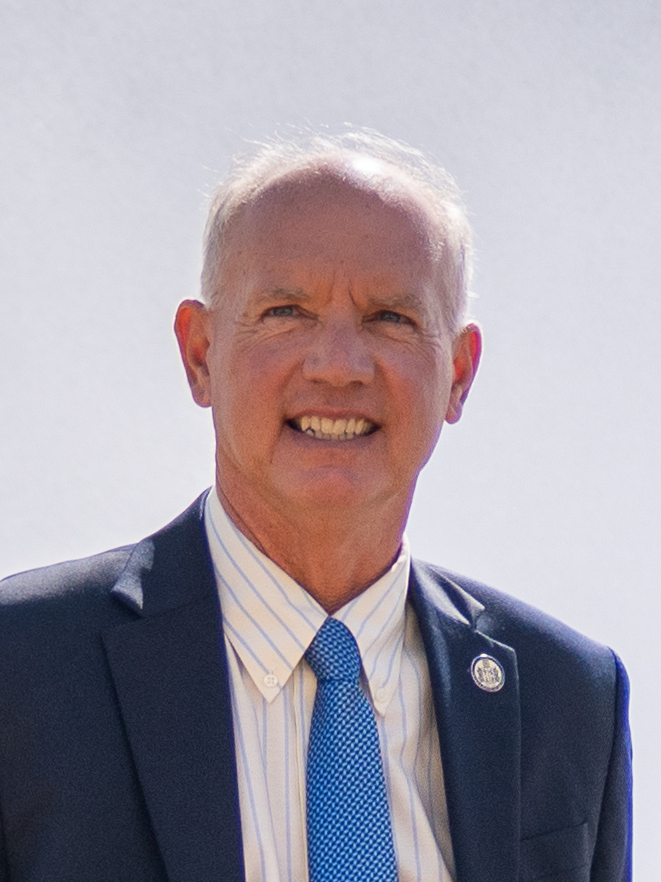

Candidate	Robert Bloxom Jr.	Liz Richardson
Party	Republican	Democratic
Popular vote	17,887	15,905
Percentage	52.87%	47.01%
State delegate before election
Robert Bloxom Jr.
Republican
State delegate after election
Robert Bloxom Jr.
Republican

House District 100 contains portions of the city of Virginia Beach, as well as all of Accomack County and Northampton County. Incumbent delegate is Republican Robert Bloxom Jr., who was first elected in 2014.

=== Republican primary ===
==== Nominee ====
- Robert Bloxom Jr., incumbent

=== Democratic primary ===
==== Nominee ====
- Liz Richardson, farmers advocate

==== Withdrew ====
- Justin Burns, teacher
- Rocco DeBellis, chef and caterer
- Charlena Jones, former Northampton County School Board member and nominee for HD-100 in 2023

=== General election ===
Predictions

Source	Ranking	As of
State Navigate	Likely R	August 15, 2025

==== Results ====
2025 Virginia 100th House of Delegates District general election
Party	Candidate	Votes	%
Republican	Robert Bloxom Jr. (incumbent)	17,887	52.87%
Democratic	Liz Richardson	15,905	47.01%
Write-in		43	0.13%
Total votes		33,835	100.00%
Republican hold			

== See also ==
- 2025 Virginia gubernatorial election
- 2025 Virginia lieutenant gubernatorial election
- 2025 Virginia Attorney General election
