= 2027 Virginia House of Delegates election =

- November 2, 2027

All 100 seats in the Virginia House of Delegates 51 seats needed for a majority
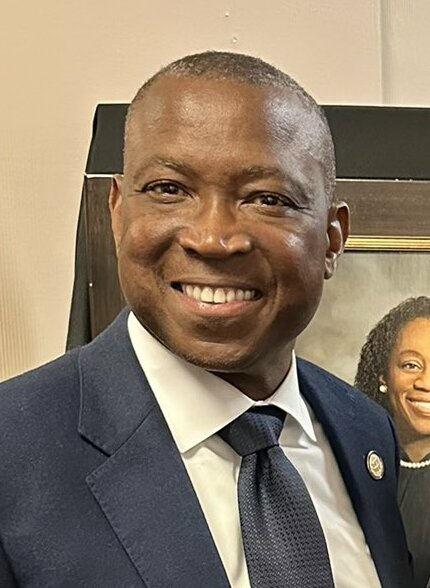

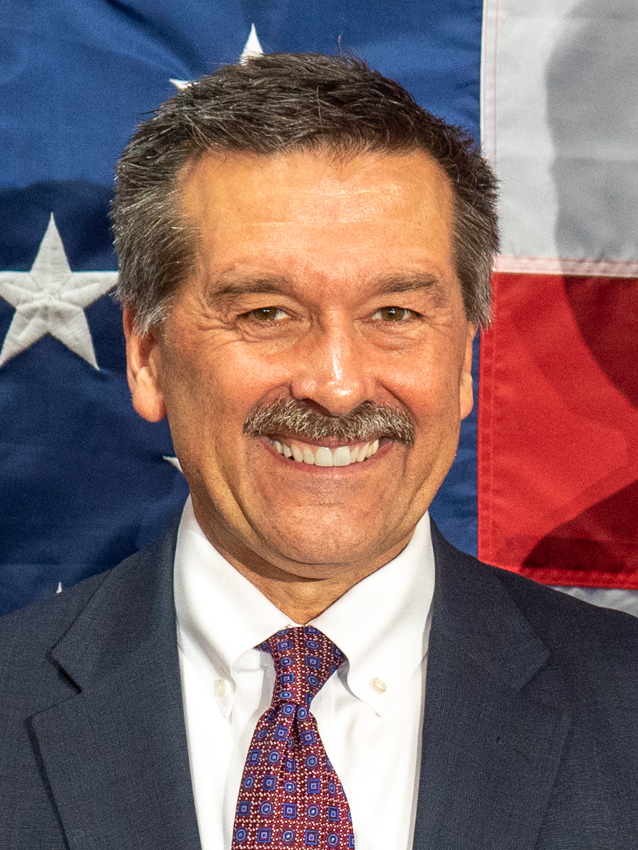
Leader	Don Scott	Terry Kilgore
Party	Democratic	Republican
Leader since	June 1, 2022	June 1, 2025
Leader's seat	88th–Portsmouth	45th–Scott
Current seats	64	36
Seats needed	Steady	▲15
Incumbent Speaker
Don Scott
Democratic

The 2027 Virginia House of Delegates election will take place on Tuesday, November 2, 2027 to elect members of the 165th Virginia General Assembly. All 100 delegates are elected to two-year terms single-member districts. The House elections will be held concurrently with elections to the Virginia Senate.

== Special elections ==
=== District 77 ===
Incumbent Delegate Michael Jones was elected to the Virginia Senate. Democrat Charlie Schmidt won Jones's seat in a special election on January 6, 2026.

Virginia's 77th House district, 2026 special election
Party	Candidate	Votes	%
Democratic	Charlie Schmidt	6,228	79.93
Republican	Richard S. Stonage Jr.	1,552	19.92
Write-in		12	0.15
Total votes		7,792	100.0
Democratic hold			

=== District 11 ===
Incumbent Delegate David Bulova was selected as Virginia Secretary of Natural Resources. His wife, Democrat Gretchen Bulova, won his seat in a special election on January 13, 2026.

Virginia's 11th House district, 2026 special election
Party	Candidate	Votes	%
Democratic	Gretchen Bulova	5,604	68.79
Republican	Adam J. Wise	2,511	30.82
Write-in		32	0.39
Total votes		8,147	100.0
Democratic hold			

=== District 23 ===
Incumbent Delegate Candi King was selected as Secretary of the Commonwealth of Virginia. Democrat Margaret Franklin won King's seat in a special election on January 13, 2026.

Virginia's 23rd House district, 2026 special election
Party	Candidate	Votes	%
Democratic	Margaret Franklin	3,133	78.27
Republican	Verndell C. Robinson	2,863	21.56
Write-in		7	0.17
Total votes		6,003	100.0
Democratic hold			

=== District 17 ===
Incumbent Delegate Mark Sickles was selected as Virginia Secretary of Finance. Democrat Garrett McGuire won Sickles' seat in a special election on January 20, 2026.

Virginia's 17th House district, 2026 special election
Party	Candidate	Votes	%
Democratic	Garrett McGuire	6,651	78.94
Republican	Chris Cardiff	1,759	20.88
Write-in		15	0.18
Total votes		8,425	100.0
Democratic hold			

=== District 5 ===
Incumbent Delegate Elizabeth Bennett-Parker resigned on February 18, 2026 to replace Adam Ebbin in the Virginia Senate. Democrat Kirk McPike won Bennett-Parker's seat in a special election on February 10, 2026.

==== Democratic primary ====
Alexandria Democrats held a firehouse primary on January 20. Alexandria City Council member R. Kirk McPike was selected as the party's nominee.

===== Candidates =====
====== Nominee ======
- R. Kirk McPike, Alexandria city council member

====== Defeated in primary ======
- Eileen Cassidy Rivera, former school board chair
- Gregory Darrall, teacher
- Chris Liebig, attorney

===== Endorsements =====
Eileen Cassidy Rivera

Federal legislators

- Don Beyer, U.S. Representative from Virginia's 8th congressional district (co-endorsement with McPike)
Kirk McPike

State legislators

- Don Beyer, U.S. Representative from Virginia's 8th congressional district (co-endorsement with Cassidy Rivera)

State legislators

- Laura Jane Cohen, state delegate for HD-15
- Paul Krizek, state delegate for HD-16

Organizations

- LGBTQ Victory Fund

===== Results =====
Virginia's 5th House District, 2026 Democratic firehouse primary
Party	Candidate	Votes	%
Democratic	Kirk McPike	1,279	60.47
Democratic	Eileen Cassidy Rivera	508	24.02
Democratic	Chris Leibig	265	12.53
Democratic	Gregory Darrall	63	2.98

==== Republican selection ====
Alexandria Republicans selected business Mason Butler as their candidate. Butler was the only candidate to apply for selection by the party. He previously ran as an independent candidate for Alexandria City Council in 2024.

==== General election ====
Virginia's 5th House district, 2026 special election
Party	Candidate	Votes	%
Democratic	Kirk McPike	7,114	82.18
Republican	Mason Butler	1,495	17.27
Write-in		48	0.55
Total votes		7,769	100.0
Democratic hold			

=== District 98 ===
Incumbent Delegate Barry Knight passed away on February 19, 2026. Republican Andrew Rice won Knights' seat in a special election on March 17, 2026.

Virginia's 98th House district, 2026 special election
Party	Candidate	Votes	%
Republican	Andrew Rice	7,850	59.40
Democratic	Cheryl Smith	5,360	40.56
Write-in		5	0.04
Total votes		13,215	100.0
Republican hold			

=== District 20 ===
Incumbent Delegate Michelle Maldonado resigned her seat on May 31, 2026 to care for an ailing family member. Democrat Sonia Vásquez Luna won Maldonado's seat in a special election on November 3, 2026 coinciding with the 2026 elections.

Virginia's 20th House district, 2026 special election
Party	Candidate	Votes	%
Democratic	Sonia Vásquez Luna	13,954	68.5
Republican	Nate Fritzen	6,388	31.3
Write-in		45	0.2
Total votes		20,387	100

== District 1 ==
House District 1 contains portions of Arlington County. Incumbent delegate is Democrat Patrick Hope, who was first elected in 2009.

=== Democratic primary ===
==== Potential ====
- Patrick Hope, incumbent

== District 2 ==
House District 2 contains portions of Arlington County. Incumbent delegate is Democrat Adele McClure, who was first elected in 2023.

=== Democratic primary ===
==== Potential ====
- Adele McClure, incumbent

== District 3 ==
House District 3 is located partially within the city of Alexandria and Arlington County. Incumbent delegate is Democrat Alfonso Lopez, who was first elected in 2011.

=== Democratic primary ===
==== Potential ====
- Alfonso Lopez, incumbent

== District 4 ==
House District 4 is located partially within the city of Alexandria and Fairfax County. Incumbent delegate is Democrat Charniele Herring, who was first elected in 2009.

=== Democratic primary ===
==== Potential ====
- Charniele Herring, incumbent

== District 5 ==
House District 5 contains portions of the city of Alexandria. Incumbent delegate is Democrat Kirk McPike, who was first elected in 2026.

=== Democratic primary ===
==== Potential ====
- Glen Pine, activist
- Kirk McPike, incumbent

== District 6 ==
House District 6 contains portions of Fairfax County. Incumbent delegate is Democrat Rip Sullivan, who was first elected in 2014.

=== Democratic primary ===
==== Potential ====
- Rip Sullivan, incumbent

== District 7 ==
House District 7 contains portions of Fairfax County. Incumbent delegate is Democrat Karen Keys-Gamarra, who was first elected in 2023.

=== Democratic primary ===
==== Potential ====
- Karen Keys-Gamarra, incumbent

== District 8 ==
House District 8 contains portions of Fairfax County. Incumbent delegate is Democrat Irene Shin, who was first elected in 2021.

=== Democratic primary ===
==== Potential ====
- Irene Shin, incumbent

== District 9 ==
House District 9 contains portions of Fairfax County. Incumbent delegate is Democrat Karrie Delaney, who was first elected in 2017.

=== Democratic primary ===
==== Potential ====
- Karrie Delaney, incumbent

== District 10 ==
House District 10 contains portions of Fairfax County. Incumbent delegate is Democrat Dan Helmer, who was first elected in 2019.

=== Democratic primary ===
==== Potential ====
- Dan Helmer, incumbent

== District 11 ==
House District 11 contains all of the city of Fairfax and portions of Fairfax County. Incumbent delegate is Democrat Gretchen Bulova, who was first elected in 2026.

=== Democratic primary ===
==== Potential ====
- Gretchen Bulova, incumbent

== District 12 ==
House District 12 contains portions of Fairfax County. Incumbent delegate is Democrat Holly Seibold, who was first elected in 2023.

=== Democratic primary ===
==== Potential ====
- Holly Seibold, incumbent

== District 13 ==
House District 13 contains all of the city of Falls Church and portions of Fairfax County. Incumbent delegate is Democrat Marcus Simon, who was first elected in 2013.

=== Democratic primary ===
==== Potential ====
- Marcus Simon, incumbent

== District 14 ==
House District 14 contains portions of Fairfax County. Incumbent delegate is Democrat Vivian Watts, who was first elected in 1995.

=== Democratic primary ===
==== Potential ====
- Vivian Watts, incumbent

== District 15 ==
House District 15 contains portions of Fairfax County. Incumbent delegate is Democrat Laura Jane Cohen, who was first elected in 2023.

=== Democratic primary ===
==== Potential ====
- Laura Jane Cohen, incumbent

== District 16 ==
House District 16 contains portions of Fairfax County. Incumbent delegate is Democrat Paul Krizek, who was first elected in 2015.

=== Democratic primary ===
==== Potential ====
- Paul Krizek, incumbent

== District 17 ==
House District 17 contains portions of Fairfax County. Incumbent delegate is Democrat Garrett McGuire, who was first elected in 2026.

=== Democratic primary ===
==== Potential ====
- Garrett McGuire, incumbent

== District 18 ==
House District 18 contains portions of Fairfax County. Incumbent delegate is Democrat Kathy Tran, who was first elected in 2017.

=== Democratic primary ===
==== Potential ====
- Kathy Tran, incumbent

== District 19 ==
House District 19 contains portions of Fairfax County and Prince William County. Incumbent delegate is Democrat Rozia Henson, who was first elected in 2023.

=== Democratic primary ===
==== Potential ====
- Rozia Henson, incumbent

== District 20 ==
House District 20 contains all of the cities of Manassas and Manassas Park. As well as portions of Prince William County.Incumbent delegate is Democrat Sonia Vásquez Luna, who was first elected in a 2026 special election.

=== Democratic primary ===
==== Potential ====
- Sonia Vásquez Luna, incumbent

== District 21 ==
House District 21 contains portions of Prince William County. Incumbent delegate is Democrat Josh Thomas, who was first elected in 2023.

=== Democratic primary ===
==== Potential ====
- Josh Thomas, incumbent

== District 22 ==
House District 22 contains portions of Prince William County. Incumbent delegate is Democrat Elizabeth Guzmán, who was first elected in 2025.

=== Democratic primary ===
==== Potential ====
- Elizabeth Guzmán, incumbent

== District 23 ==
House District 23 contains portions of Prince William County and Stafford County. Incumbent delegate is Democrat Margaret Franklin, who was first elected in 2026.

=== Democratic primary ===
==== Potential ====
- Margaret Franklin, incumbent

== District 24 ==
House District 24 contains portions of Prince William County. Incumbent delegate is Democrat Luke Torian, who was first elected in 2009.

=== Democratic primary ===
==== Potential ====
- Luke Torian, incumbent

== District 25 ==
House District 25 contains portions of Prince William County. Incumbent delegate is Democrat Briana Sewell, who was first elected in 2021.

=== Democratic primary ===
==== Potential ====
- Briana Sewell, incumbent

== District 26 ==
House District 26 contains portions of Loudoun County. Incumbent delegate is Democrat JJ Singh, who was first elected in 2025.

=== Democratic primary ===
==== Potential ====
- JJ Singh, incumbent

== District 27 ==
House District 27 contains portions of Loudoun County. Incumbent delegate is Democrat Atoosa Reaser, who was first elected in 2023.

=== Democratic primary ===
==== Potential ====
- Atoosa Reaser, incumbent>ref name="VPAP"/>

== District 28 ==
House District 28 contains portions of Loudoun County. Incumbent delegate is Democrat David A. Reid, who was first elected in 2017

=== Democratic primary ===
==== Potential ====
- David A. Reid, incumbent

== District 29 ==
House District 29 contains portions of Loudoun County. Incumbent delegate is Democrat Marty Martinez, who was first elected in 2023.

=== Democratic primary ===
==== Potential ====
- Marty Martinez, incumbent

== District 30 ==
House District 30 contains portions of Fauquier County and Loudoun County. Incumbent delegate is Democrat John McAuliff, who was first elected in 2025.

=== Democratic primary ===
==== Potential ====
- John McAuliff, incumbent

== District 31 ==
House District 31 contains all of Clarke County and portions of Frederick County and Warren County. Incumbent delegate is RepublicanDelores Riley Oates, who was first elected in 2023.

=== Republican primary ===
==== Potential ====
- Delores Riley Oates, incumbent

== District 32 ==
House District 32 contains the entire city of Winchester and portions of Frederick County. Incumbent delegate is Republican Bill Wiley, who was first elected in 2020.

=== Republican primary ===
==== Potential ====
- Bill Wiley, incumbent

== District 33 ==
House District 33 contains all of Page County and Shenandoah County. As well as portions of Rockingham County and Warren County. Incumbent delegate is Republican Justin Pence, who was first elected in 2025.

=== Republican primary ===
==== Potential ====
- Justin Pence, incumbent

== District 34 ==
House District 34 contains the city of Harrisonburg and portions of Rockingham County. Incumbent delegate is Republican Tony Wilt, who was first elected in 2010.

=== Republican primary ===
==== Potential ====
- Tony Wilt, incumbent

== District 35 ==
House District 35 contains all of Bath County and Highland County. As well as portions of Augusta County and Rockingham County. Incumbent delegate is Republican Chris Runion, who was first elected in 2019.

=== Republican primary ===
==== Potential ====
- Chris Runion, incumbent

== District 36 ==
House District 36 contains the cities of Staunton and Waynesboro. As well as portions of Augusta County and Rockbridge County. Incumbent delegate is Republican Ellen Campbell, who was first elected in 2023.

=== Republican primary ===
==== Potential ====
- Ellen Campbell, incumbent

== District 37 ==
House District 37 contains the cities of Buena Vista, Covington, and Lexington. As well as all of Alleghany County, Botetourt County, and Craig County. Also portions of Rockbridge County. Incumbent delegate is Republican Terry Austin, who was first elected in 2013.

=== Republican primary ===
==== Potential ====
- Terry Austin, incumbent

== District 38 ==
House District 38 contains portions of the city of Roanoke. Incumbent delegate is Democrat Sam Rasoul, who was first elected in 2013.

=== Democratic primary ===
==== Potential ====
- Sam Rasoul, incumbent

== District 39 ==
House District 39 contains all of Franklin County and portions of Roanoke County. Incumbent delegate is Republican Will Davis, who was first elected in 2023.

=== Republican primary ===
==== Potential ====
- Will Davis, incumbent

== District 40 ==
House District 40 contains the entire city of Salem, portions of the city of Roanoke, and portions of Roanoke County. Incumbent delegate is Republican Joe McNamara, who was first elected in 2018.

=== Republican primary ===
==== Potential ====
- Joe McNamara, incumbent

== District 41 ==
House District 41 contains portions of Montgomery County and Roanoke County. Incumbent delegate is Democrat Lily Franklin, who was first elected in 2025.

=== Democratic primary ===
==== Potential ====
- Lily Franklin, incumbent

== District 42 ==
House District 42 contains the entire city of Radford and Giles County. As well as portions of Pulaski County and Montgomery County. Incumbent delegate is Republican Jason Ballard, who was first elected in 2021.

=== Republican primary ===
==== Potential ====
- Jason Ballard, incumbent

== District 43 ==
House District 43 contains all of Bland County, Buchanan County, and Tazewell County. As well as portions of Dickenson County and Russell County. Incumbent delegate is Republican Will Morefield, who was first elected in 2009.

=== Republican primary ===
==== Potential ====
- Will Morefield, incumbent

== District 44 ==
House District 44 contains the entire city of Bristol and Washington County. As well as portions of Russell County. Incumbent delegate is Republican Israel O'Quinn, who was first elected in 2011.

=== Republican primary ===
==== Potential ====
- Israel O'Quinn, incumbent

== District 45 ==
House District 45 contains the entire city of Norton, Lee County, Scott County, and Wise County. As well as portions of Dickenson County. Incumbent Delegate is Republican Terry Kilgore, who was first elected in 1993.

=== Republican primary ===
==== Potential ====
- Terry Kilgore, incumbent

== District 46 ==
House District 46 contains all of Grayson County, Smyth County, and Wythe County. As well as portions of Pulaski County. Incumbent delegate is Republican Mitchell Cornett, who was first elected in 2025.

=== Republican primary ===
==== Potential ====
- Mitchell Cornett, incumbent

== District 47 ==
House District 47 contains the entire city of Galax, Carroll County, Floyd County, and Patrick County. As well as portions of Henry County. Incumbent delegate is Republican Wren Williams, who was also first elected in 2021.

=== Republican primary ===
==== Potential ====
- Wren Williams, incumbent

== District 48 ==
House District 48 contains the entire city of Martinsville. As well as portions of Henry County and Pittsylvania County. Incumbent delegate is Republican Eric Philips, who was first elected in 2024.

=== Republican primary ===
==== Potential ====
- Eric Philips, incumbent

== District 49 ==
House District 49 contains the entire city of Danville. As well as portions of Halifax County and Pittsylvania County. Incumbent delegate is Republican Madison Whittle, who was first elected in 2025.

=== Republican primary ===
==== Potential ====
- Madison Whittle, incumbent

== District 50 ==
House District 50 contains all of Charlotte County, Lunenburg County, and Mecklenburg County. As well as portions of Halifax County and Prince Edward County. Incumbent delegate is Republican Tommy Wright who was first elected in 2000.

=== Republican primary ===
==== Potential ====
- Tommy Wright, incumbent

== District 51 ==
House District 51 contains portions of Bedford County, Campbell County, and Pittsylvania County. Incumbent delegate is Republican Eric Zehr, who was first elected in 2023.

=== Republican primary ===
==== Potential ====
- Eric Zehr, incumbent

== District 52 ==
House District 52 contains the entire city of Lynchburg and portions of Campbell County. Incumbent delegate is Republican Wendell Walker, who was first elected in 2019.

=== Republican primary ===
==== Potential ====
- Wendell Walker, incumbent

== District 53 ==
House District 53 contains all of Amherst County. As well as portions of Bedford County and Nelson County. Incumbent delegate is Republican Tim Griffin, who was first elected in 2023.

=== Republican primary ===
==== Potential ====
- Tim Griffin, incumbent

== District 54 ==
House District 54 contains the entire city of Charlottesville and portions of Albemarle County. Incumbent delegate is Democrat Katrina Callsen, who was first elected in 2023.

=== Democratic primary ===
==== Potential ====
- Katrina Callsen, incumbent

== District 55 ==
House District 55 contains portions of Albemarle County, Fluvanna County, Louisa County, and Nelson County. Incumbent delegate is Democrat Amy Laufer, who was first elected in 2023.

=== Democratic primary ===
==== Potential ====
- Amy Laufer, incumbent

== District 56 ==
House District 56 contains all of Appomattox County, Buckingham County, and Cumberland County. As well as portions of Fluvanna County, Goochland County, Louisa County, and Prince Edward County. Incumbent delegate is Republican Tom Garrett, who was first elected in 2023.

=== Republican primary ===
==== Potential ====
- Tom Garrett, incumbent

== District 57 ==
House District 57 contains portions of Goochland County and Henrico County. The incumbent is Democrat May Nivar, who was first elected in 2025.

=== Democratic primary ===
==== Potential ====
- May Nivar, incumbent

== District 58 ==
House District 58 contains potions of Henrico County. Incumbent delegate is Democrat Rodney Willett, who was first elected in 2019.

=== Democratic primary ===
==== Potential ====
- Rodney Willett, incumbent

== District 59 ==
House District 59 contains portions of Hanover County, Henrico County, and Louisa County. Incumbent delegate is Republican Buddy Fowler, who was first elected in 2013.

=== Republican primary ===
==== Potential ====
- Buddy Fowler, incumbent

== District 60 ==
House District 60 contains portions of Hanover County and New Kent County. Incumbent delegate is Republican Scott Wyatt, who was first elected in 2019.

=== Republican primary ===
==== Potential ====
- Scott Wyatt, incumbent

== District 61 ==
House District 61 contains all of Rappahannock County and portions of Culpeper County and Fauquier County. Incumbent delegate is Republican Michael Webert, who was first elected in 2011.

=== Republican primary ===
==== Potential ====
- Michael Webert, incumbent

== District 62 ==
House District 62 contains all of Greene County and Madison County. As well as portions of Culpeper County and Orange County. Incumbent delegate is Republican Karen Hamilton, who was first elected in 2025.

=== Republican primary ===
==== Potential ====
- Karen Hamilton, incumbent

== District 63 ==
House District 63 contains portions of Orange County and Spotsylvania County. Incumbent delegate is Republican Philip Scott, who was first elected in 2021.

=== Republican primary ===
==== Potential ====
- Philip Scott, incumbent

== District 64 ==
House District 64 contains portions of Stafford County. Incumbent delegate is Democrat Stacey Carroll, who was first elected in 2025.

=== Democratic primary ===
==== Declared ====
- Stacey Carroll. incumbent

== District 65 ==
House District 65 contains the entire city of Fredericksburg and portions of Spotsylvania County and Stafford County. Incumbent delegate is Democrat Joshua G. Cole, who was first elected in 2023.

=== Democratic primary ===
==== Potential ====
- Joshua G. Cole, incumbent

== District 66 ==
House District 66 contains portions of Caroline County and Spotsylvania County. Incumbent delegate is Democrat Nicole Cole, who was first elected in 2025.

=== Democratic primary ===
==== Potential ====
- Nicole Cole, incumbent

== District 67 ==
House District 67 contains all of King George County, Lancaster County, Northumberland County, Richmond County, and Westmoreland County. As well as portions of Caroline County. Incumbent delegate is Republican Hillary Pugh Kent, who was first elected in 2023.

=== Republican primary ===
==== Potential ====
- Hillary Pugh Kent, incumbent

== District 68 ==
House District 68 contains all of Essex County, King & Queen County, King William County, Mathews County, and Middlesex County. As well as portions of Gloucester County. Incumbent delegate is Republican Keith Hodges, who was first elected in 2011.

=== Republican primary ===
==== Potential ====
- Keith Hodges, incumbent

== District 69 ==
House District 69 contains portions of the city of Newport News, Gloucester County, James City County, and York County. Incumbent delegate is Democrat Mark Downey, who was first elected in 2025.

=== Democratic primary ===
==== Declared ====
- Mark Downey, incumbent

== District 70 ==
House District 70 contains portions of the city of Newport News. Incumbent delegate is Democrat Shelly Simonds, who was first elected in 2019.

=== Democratic primary ===
==== Potential ====
- Shelly Simonds, incumbent

== District 71 ==
House District 71 contains all of the city of Williamsburg. As well as portions of James City County and New Kent County. Incumbent delegate is Democrat Jessica Anderson, who was first elected in 2025.

=== Democratic primary ===
==== Potential ====
- Jessica Anderson, incumbent

== District 72 ==
House District 72 contains all of Amelia County, Nottoway County, and Powhatan County. As well as portions of Chesterfield County. Incumbent delegate is Republican Lee Ware, who was first elected in 1998.

=== Republican primary ===
==== Potential ====
- Lee Ware, incumbent

== District 73 ==
House District 73 contains portions of Chesterfield County. Incumbent delegate is Democrat Leslie Mehta, who was first elected in 2025.

=== Democratic primary ===
==== Declared ====
- Leslie Mehta, incumbent

== District 74 ==
House District 74 contains the entire city of Colonial Heights and portions of Chesterfield County. Incumbent delegate is Republican Mike Cherry, who was first elected in 2021.

=== Republican primary ===
==== Potential ====
- Mike Cherry, incumbent

== District 75 ==
House District 75 contains all of the city of Hopewell and portions of Chesterfield County and Prince George County. Incumbent delegate is Democrat Lindsey Dougherty, who was first elected in 2025.

=== Democratic primary ===
==== Potential ====
- Lindsey Dougherty, incumbent

== District 76 ==
House District 76 contains portions of Chesterfield County. Incumbent delegate is Democrat Debra Gardner, who was first elected in 2023.

=== Democratic primary ===
==== Potential ====
- Debra Gardner, incumbent

== District 77 ==
House District 77 contains portions of the city of Richmond and Chesterfield County. Incumbent delegate is Democrat Charlie Schmidt, who was first elected in 2026.

=== Democratic primary ===
==== Declared ====
- Charlie Schmidt, incumbent

== District 78 ==
House District 78 contains portions of the city of Richmond. Incumbent delegate is Democrat Betsy Carr, who was first elected in 2009.

=== Democratic primary ===
- Betsy Carr, incumbent

== District 79 ==
House District 79 contains portions of the city of Richmond. Incumbent delegate is Democrat Rae Cousins, who was first elected in 2023.

=== Democratic primary ===
==== Declared ====
- Rae Cousins, incumbent

== District 80 ==
House District 80 contains portions of Henrico County. Incumbent delegate is Democrat Destiny Levere Bolling, who was first elected in 2023.

=== Democratic primary ===
==== Potential ====
- Destiny Levere Bolling, incumbent

== District 81 ==
House District 81 contains all of Charles City County and portions of Henrico County and Chesterfield County. Incumbent delegate is Democrat Delores McQuinn, who was first elected in 2009.

=== Democratic primary ===
==== Potential ====
- Delores McQuinn, incumbent

== District 82 ==
House District 82 contains the entire of the city of Petersburg and Surry County. As well as portions of Dinwiddie County and Prince George County. Incumbent delegate is Democrat Kimberly Pope Adams, who was first elected in 2025.

=== Democratic primary ===
==== Potential ====
- Kimberly Pope Adams, incumbent

== District 83 ==
House District 83 contains all of the city of Emporia, Brunswick County. Greensville County, Southampton County, and Sussex County. As well as portions of Dinwiddie County and Isle of Wight County. Incumbent delegate is Republican Otto Wachsmann, who was first elected in 2021.

=== Republican Priamry ===
==== Potential ====
- Otto Wachsmann, incumbent

== District 84 ==
House District 84 contains all of the city of Franklin. As well as portions of the city of Suffolk and Isle of Wight County. Incumbent delegate is Democrat Nadarius Clark, who was first elected in 2021.

=== Democratic primary ===
==== Potential ====
- Nadarius Clark, incumbent

== District 85 ==
House District 85 contains portions of the city of Newport News. Incumbent delegate is Democrat Cia Price, who was first elected in 2015.

=== Democratic primary ===
==== Potential ====
- Cia Price, incumbent

== District 86 ==
House District 86 contains the entire city of Poquoson. As well as portions of the city of Hampton and York County. Incumbent delegate is Democrat Virgil Thornton Sr., who was first elected in 2025.

=== Democratic primary ===
==== Potential ====
- Virgil Thornton Sr., incumbent

== District 87 ==
House District 87 contains portions of the city of Hampton. Incumbent delegate is Democrat Jeion Ward, who was first elected in 2003.

=== Democratic primary ===
==== Potential ====
- Jeion Ward, incumbent

== District 88 ==
House District 88 contains portions of the city of Portsmouth. Incumbent delegate is Democrat Don Scott, who was first elected in 2019.

=== Democratic primary ===
==== Potential ====
- Don Scott, incumbent

== District 89 ==
House District 89 contains portions of the cities of Chesapeake and Suffolk. Incumbent delegate is Democrat Kacey Carnegie, who was first elected in 2025.

=== Democratic primary ===
==== Potential ====
- Kacey Carnegie, incumbent

== District 90 ==
House District 90 contains portions of the city of Chesapeake. Incumbent delegate is Republican Jay Leftwich, who was first elected in 2013.

=== Republican primary ===
==== Potential ====
- Jay Leftwich, incumbent

== District 91 ==
House District 91 contains portions of the cities of Chesapeake and Portsmouth. Incumbent delegate is Democrat Cliff Hayes Jr., who was first elected in 2016.

=== Democratic primary ===
==== Potential ====
- Cliff Hayes Jr., incumbent

== District 92 ==
House District 92 contains portions of the cities of Chesapeake and Norfolk. Incumbent delegate is Democrat Bonita Anthony, who was first elected in 2023.

=== Democratic primary ===
==== Potential ====
- Bonita Anthony, incumbent

== District 93 ==
House District 93 contains portions of the city of Norfolk. Incumbent delegate is Jackie Glass, who was first elected in 2022.

=== Democratic primary ===
==== Potential ====
- Jackie Glass, incumbent

== District 94 ==
House District 94 contains portions of the city of Norfolk. Incumbent delegate is Democrat Phil Hernandez, who was first elected in 2023.

=== Democratic primary ===
==== Potential ====
- Phil Hernandez, incumbent

== District 95 ==
House District 95 contains portions of the cities of Norfolk and Virginia Beach. Incumbent delegate is Democrat Alex Askew, who was first elected in 2023.

=== Democratic primary ===
==== Potential ====
- Alex Askew, incumbent

== District 96 ==
House District contains portions of the city of Virginia Beach. incumbent delegate is Democrat Kelly Convirs-Fowler, who was first elected in 2017.

=== Democratic primary ===
==== Potential ====
- Kelly Convirs-Fowler, incumbent

== District 97 ==
House District 97 contains portions of the city of Virginia Beach. Incumbent delegate is Democrat Michael Feggans, who was first elected in 2023.

=== Democratic primary ===
==== Potential ====
- Michael Feggans, incumbent

== District 98 ==
House District 98 contains portions of the city of Virginia Beach. The incumbent delegate is Republican Andrew Rice, who was first elected in 2026.

=== Republican primary ===
==== Potential ====
- Andrew Rice, incumbent

== District 99 ==
House District 99 contains portions of thee city of Virginia Beach. Incumbent delegate is Republican Anne Ferrell Tata, who was first elected in 2021.

=== Republican primary ===
==== Potential ====
- Anne Ferrell Tata, incumbent

=== Democratic primary ===
==== Potential ====
- Cat Porterfield, journalist and nominee for this seat in 2023

== District 100 ==
House District 100 contains portions of the city of Virginia Beach. As well as all of Accomack County and Northampton County. Incumbent delegate is Republican Robert Bloxom Jr., who was first elected in 2014.

=== Republican primary ===
==== Potential ====
- Robert Bloxom Jr., incumbent

== See also ==
- 2027 Virginia Senate election
