= 2026 Virginia elections =

American state elections

- November 3, 2026

Elections in Virginia are scheduled to take place throughout 2026.

== Special elections ==
=== 15th Senate district ===
Ghazala Hashmi stepped down from her seat for the 15th Senate district following her election as Lieutenant Governor of Virginia. Democratic Party primary elections were held on December 7, 2025. A special election was held on January 6, 2026, electing Michael Jones.

Virginia Senate special general election: 15th district, 2026
Party	Candidate	Votes	%	±%
Democratic	Michael Jones	12,604	70.75%	+8.60%
Republican	John Thomas	5,187	29.12%	−8.34%
Write-in		24	0.13%	-0.25%
Total votes		17,815	100.0%	
Democratic hold				

=== 77th House of Delegates district ===
Michael Jones stepped down from his seat for the 77th House of Delegates district following his victory in the Democratic Party primary special election for the 15th Senate district. A special election was held on January 6, 2026, electing Charlie Schmidt.

Virginia House of Delegates special general election: 77th district, 2026
Party	Candidate	Votes	%	±%
Democratic	Charlie Schmidt	6,228	79.93%	−11.12%
Republican	Richard Stonage Jr.	1,552	19.92%	+19.92%
Write-in		12	0.15%	-8.80%
Total votes		7,792	100.0%	
Democratic hold				

=== 11th House of Delegates district ===
David Bulova stepped down from his seat for the 11th House of Delegates district after he was selected to be Virginia Secretary of Natural Resources by incoming Governor of Virginia Abigail Spanberger. A special election was held on January 13, 2026, electing Gretchen Bulova.

Virginia House of Delegates special general election: 11th district, 2026
Party	Candidate	Votes	%	±%
Democratic	Gretchen Bulova	5,996	69.69%	−0.92%
Republican	Adam Wise	2,573	29.90%	+0.83%
Write-in		35	0.41%	+0.09%
Total votes		8,604	100.0%	
Democratic hold				

=== 23rd House of Delegates district ===
Candi King stepped down from her seat for the 23rd House of Delegates district after she was selected to be Secretary of the Commonwealth of Virginia by incoming Governor of Virginia Abigail Spanberger. A special election was held on January 13, 2026, electing Margaret Franklin.

Virginia House of Delegates special general election: 23rd district, 2026
Party	Candidate	Votes	%	±%
Democratic	Margaret Franklin	3,143	78.28%	+10.33%
Republican	Verndell Robinson	865	21.54%	−10.13%
Write-in		7	0.17%	-0.21%
Total votes		4,015	100.0%	
Democratic hold				

=== 17th House of Delegates district ===
Mark Sickles stepped down from his seat for the 17th House of Delegates district after he was selected to be Virginia Secretary of Finance by incoming Governor of Virginia Abigail Spanberger. Democratic Party primary elections were held on December 28, 2025. A special election was held on January 20, 2026, electing Garrett McGuire.

Virginia House of Delegates special general election: 17th district, 2026
Party	Candidate	Votes	%	±%
Democratic	Garrett McGuire	6,651	78.94%	−14.09%
Republican	Christopher Cardiff	1,759	20.88%	+20.88%
Write-in		15	0.18%	-7.64%
Total votes		8,425	100.0%	
Democratic hold				

=== 39th Senate district ===
Adam Ebbin stepped down from his seat for the 39th Senate district after he was selected to be a senior advisor at the Virginia Cannabis Control Authority by incoming Governor of Virginia Abigail Spanberger. Democratic Party primary elections were held on January 13, 2026. A special election was held on February 10, 2026, electing Elizabeth Bennett-Parker.

Virginia Senate special general election: 39th district, 2026
Party	Candidate	Votes	%	±%
Democratic	Elizabeth Bennett-Parker	13,327	83.42%	+5.12%
Republican	Julie Robben Lineberry	2,603	16.29%	−5.08%
Write-in		46	0.29%	-0.04%
Total votes		15,976	100.0%	
Democratic hold				

=== 5th House of Delegates district ===
Elizabeth Bennett-Parker stepped down from her seat for the 5th House of Delegates district following her victory in the Democratic Party primary special election for the 39th Senate district. Democratic Party primary elections were held on January 20, 2026. A special election was held on February 10, 2026, electing R. Kirk McPike.

Virginia House of Delegates special general election: 5th district, 2026
Party	Candidate	Votes	%	±%
Democratic	R. Kirk McPike	7,114	82.18%	−9.20%
Republican	Marvin Mason Butler	1,495	17.27%	+17.27%
Write-in		48	0.55%	-8.07%
Total votes		8,657	100.0%	
Democratic hold				

=== 98th House of Delegates district ===
Barry Knight, representative of the 98th House of Delegates district, died on February 19, 2026. A special election was held on March 17, 2026, electing C. Andrew Rice.

Virginia House of Delegates special general election: 98th district, 2026
Party	Candidate	Votes	%	±%
Republican	C. Andrew Rice	7,850	59.40%	+2.76%
Democratic	Cheryl B. Smith	5,360	40.56%	−2.64%
Write-in		5	0.04%	-0.11%
Total votes		13,214	100.0%	
Republican hold				

=== 20th House of Delegates district ===
Michelle Maldonado, representative of the 20th House of Delegates district, resigned her seat on May 31, 2026 to care for an ailing family member. A special election to fill the seat was held on November 3, 2026, electing Sonia Vásquez Luna.

Virginia House of Delegates special general election: 20th district, 2026
Party	Candidate	Votes	%
Democratic	Sonia Vásquez Luna	16,413	69.69%
Republican	Nate Fritzen	7,087	30.09%
Write-in		52	0.22%
Total votes		23,552	100%
Democratic hold			

== Federal offices ==
=== United States Senate ===
Incumbent Democratic Senator Mark Warner ran for re-election to a fourth term in the United States Senate. Primary elections was held on August 4, 2026. The general election was held on November 3, 2026. Warner was re-elected with 61% of the vote.

=== United States House of Representatives ===
All 11 seats representing Virginia in the United States House of Representatives were up for election in 2026. Primary elections were held on August 4, 2026. The general election was held on November 3, 2026. Two districts flipped from Republican to Democratic.

== Ballot measures ==
=== Redistricting amendment ===
HJ6007 (legislatively initiated October 31, 2025, affirmed January 16, 2026) was to amend the constitution to allow legislative mid-decade redistricting of congressional districts in response to mid-decade redistricting by other states. The measure appeared on the April 21, 2026 ballot and initially passed with 51.69% of the vote. On April 28, the Supreme Court of Virginia ruled against the certification and implementation of the results and the congressional districts boundaries remained unaltered.

=== Abortion rights amendment ===
HJ1 / SJ247 (legislatively initiated March 24, 2025, affirmed January 16, 2026) would amend the constitution to guarantee a right to abortion. The measure appeared on the November 2026 ballot and passed with 62% of the vote.

=== Marriage equality amendment ===
HJ9 / SJ249 (legislatively initiated March 24, 2025, affirmed January 16, 2026) would amend the constitution to codify same-sex and interracial marriage. The measure appeared on the November 2026 ballot and passed with 58% of the vote.

=== Voting rights restoration amendment ===
HJ2 / SJ248 (legislatively initiated March 24, 2025, affirmed January 16, 2026) would amend the constitution to automatically restore voting rights to formerly-incarcerated individuals. The measure appeared on the November 2026 ballot and passed with 56% of the vote.
