= 2027 Virginia Senate election =

- November 2, 2027

All 40 seats in the Virginia Senate 21 (Note: A majority of 20 is possible for the Democrats as the lieutenant governor of Virginia, who was elected in 2025, can serve as a tie-breaker vote.) seats needed for a majority
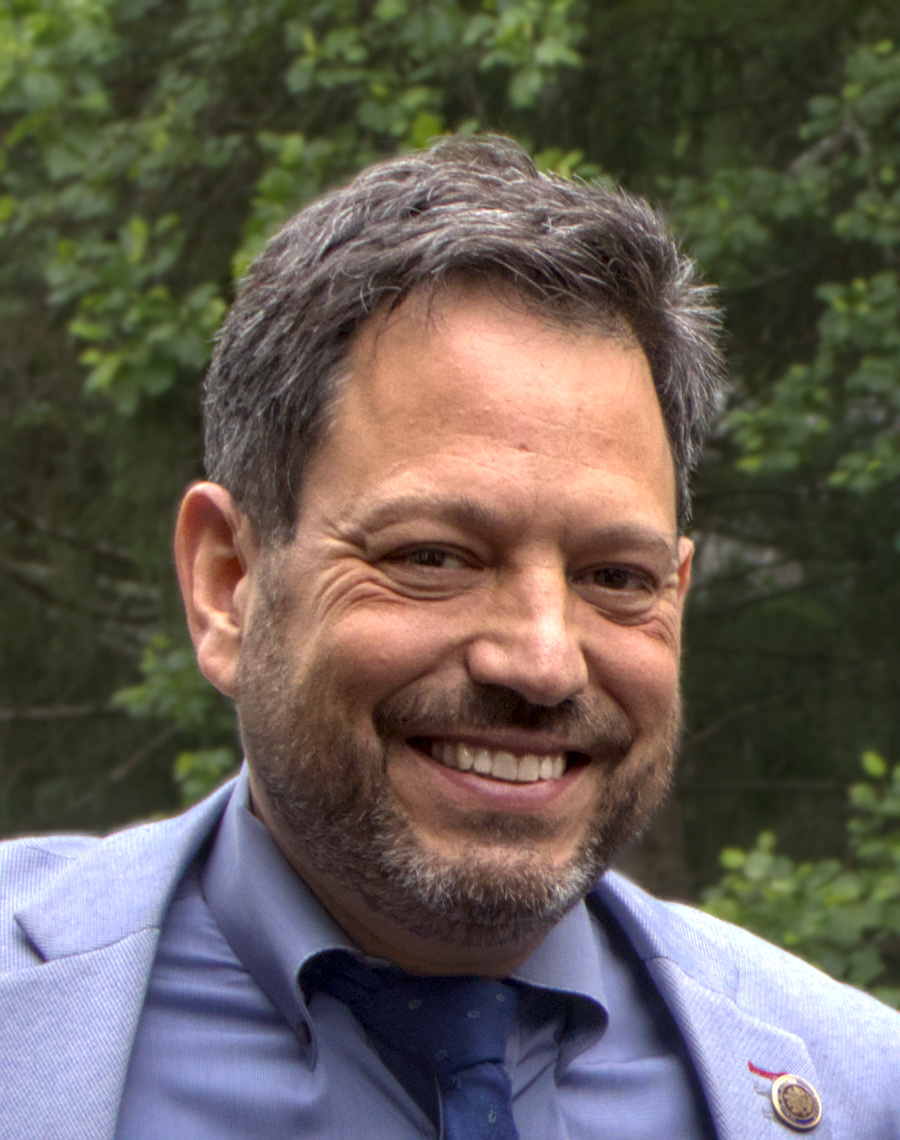

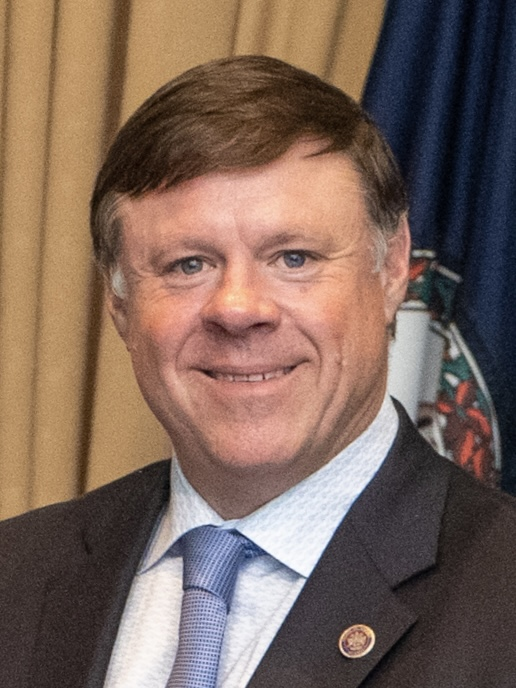
Leader	Scott Surovell	Ryan McDougle
Party	Democratic	Republican
Leader since	January 10, 2024	January 10, 2024
Leader's seat	34th–Mount Vernon	26th–Mechanicsville
Last election	21 seats, 49.84%	19 seats, 48.39%
Current seats	21	19
Seats needed	Steady	▲2
- Status of the incumbents: Democratic incumbent Republican incumbent Retiring Republican
Incumbent Majority Leader
Scott Surovell
Democratic

The 2027 Virginia Senate election will take place on November 2, 2027. All 40 seats in the Virginia Senate are up for election. Prior to the election 21 Senate seats were held by Democrats and 19 seats were held by Republicans.

== Background ==
=== Partisan background ===
Harris 40–50% 50–60% 60–70% 70–80% 80-90% / Trump 40–50% 50–60% 60–70% 70–80% 80–90%

In the 2024 US presidential election, Kamala Harris won 25 districts, while Donald Trump won 15. Republicans currently represent four districts won by Harris in 2024: Districts 12 (Glen Sturtevant, Harris +0.17%), 17 (Emily Jordan, Harris +4.65%), 24 (Danny Diggs, Harris +8.13%), and 27 (Tara Durant, Harris +3.08%).

District	Harris margin of victory in 2024	Incumbent	Party	First elected	Incumbent margin of victory in 2023
12th district	D+0.17	Glen Sturtevant	Republican	2023	R+9.7
17th district	D+4.65	Emily Jordan	Republican	2023	R+4.82
24th district	D+8.13	Danny Diggs	Republican	2023	R+1.07
27th district	D+3.08	Tara Durant	Republican	2023	R+1.76

== Retirements ==
One incumbent is not seeking re-election.

=== Republicans ===
1. District 10: Luther Cifers is retiring.

== Summary of results by district ==
District	2024 Pres.	Incumbent	Party	Elected Senator	Outcome
1st	R +28.1	Timmy French	Rep	TBD	
2nd	R +30.2	Mark Obenshain	Rep	TBD	
3rd	R +28.1	Chris Head	Rep	TBD	
4th	R +1.3	David Suetterlein	Rep	TBD	
5th	R +36.4	Travis Hackworth	Rep	TBD	
6th	R +61.1	Todd Pillion	Rep	TBD	
7th	R +45.1	Bill Stanley	Rep	TBD	
8th	R +36.6	Mark Peake	Rep	TBD	
9th	R +21.6	Tammy Brankley Mulchi	Rep	TBD	
10th	R +26.6	Luther Cifers	Rep	TBD	
11th	D +25.5	Creigh Deeds	Dem	TBD	
12th	D +0.2	Glen Sturtevant	Rep	TBD	
13th	D +21.7	Lashrecse Aird	Dem	TBD	
14th	D +63.8	Lamont Bagby	Dem	TBD	
15th	D +29.0	Michael Jones	Dem	TBD	
16th	D +17.9	Schuyler VanValkenburg	Dem	TBD	
17th	D +4.7	Emily Jordan	Rep	TBD	
18th	D +26.1	Louise Lucas	Dem	TBD	
19th	R +12.1	Christie Craig	Rep	TBD	
20th	R +3.1	Bill DeSteph	Rep	TBD	
21st	D +46.7	Angelia Williams Graves	Dem	TBD	
22nd	D +14.6	Aaron Rouse	Dem	TBD	
23rd	D +39.5	Mamie Locke	Dem	TBD	
24th	D +8.1	Danny Diggs	Rep	TBD	
25th	R +15.3	Richard Stuart	Rep	TBD	
26th	R +19.2	Ryan McDougle	Rep	TBD	
27th	D +3.1	Tara Durant	Rep	TBD	
28th	R +25.4	Bryce Reeves	Rep	TBD	
29th	D +16.9	Jeremy McPike	Dem	TBD	
30th	D +8.7	Danica Roem	Dem	TBD	
31st	D +8.6	Russet Perry	Dem	TBD	
32nd	D +21.4	Kannan Srinivasan	Dem	TBD	
33rd	D +29.9	Jennifer Carroll Foy	Dem	TBD	
34th	D +39.0	Scott Surovell	Dem	TBD	
35th	D +33.0	Dave Marsden	Dem	TBD	
36th	D +26.4	Stella Pekarsky	Dem	TBD	
37th	D +40.8	Saddam Azlan Salim	Dem	TBD	
38th	D +38.9	Jennifer Boysko	Dem	TBD	
39th	D +55.2	Elizabeth Bennett-Parker	Dem	TBD	
40th	D +58.3	Barbara Favola	Dem	TBD	

== Special elections ==
=== District 15 ===
Incumbent Senator Ghazala Hashmi, first elected in 2019, was elected as Lieutenant Governor of Virginia.

Virginia's 15th Senate district, 2026 special election
Party	Candidate	Votes	%
Democratic	Michael Jones	12,604	70.75
Republican	John Thomas	5,187	29.12
Write-in		24	0.13
Total votes		17,815	100.0
Democratic hold			

=== District 39 ===
Incumbent Senator Adam Ebbin, first elected in 2011, will resign to become a senior advisor to the Virginia Cannabis Control Authority. A special election will be held on February 10.

==== Democratic primary ====
Alexandria, Arlington, and Fairfax Democrats was held a firehouse primary on January 13.

===== Candidates =====
====== Nominee ======
- Elizabeth Bennett-Parker, state delegate for HD-5

====== Defeated in primary ======
- Amy Jackson, former Vice Mayor of Alexandria
- Mark Levine, former state delegate for HD-45
- Charles Sumpter, World Wildlife Fund executive

===== Endorsements =====
Elizabeth Bennett-Parker

State officials

- Abigail Spanberger, governor-elect

State legislators

- Adam Ebbin, state senator for SD-39
- Barbara Favola, state senator for SD-40
- Charniele Herring, Majority Leader of the Virginia House of Delegates and state delegate for HD-4
- Patrick Hope, state delegate for HD-1
- Alfonso H. Lopez, state delegate for HD-3
- Louise Lucas, president pro tempore of the Virginia Senate and state senator for SD-18
- Don Scott, Speaker of the Virginia House of Delegates and state delegate for HD-80
- Scott Surovell, Majority Leader of the Virginia Senate and state senator for SD-36

Local officials

- Alyia Gaskins, mayor of Alexandria
- Jeff McKay, chair of the Fairfax County Board of Supervisors
- Justin Wilson, former mayor of Alexandria

===== Results =====
Virginia's 39th Senate District, 2026 Democratic firehouse primary
Party	Candidate	Votes	%
Democratic	Elizabeth Bennett-Parker	3,281	70.6%
Democratic	Mark Levine	807	17.4%
Democratic	Charles Sumpter	321	6.9%
Democratic	Amy Jackson	238	5.1%

==== Republican nomination ====
A canvass was set to be held at the headquarters of the Alexandria Republican Party to select a candidate on January 13. Julie Robben Lineberry was selected as the Republican candidate as she was the only person to apply for the role.

==== General election ====
Virginia's 39th Senate district, 2026 special election
Party	Candidate	Votes	%
Democratic	Elizabeth Bennett-Parker	13,327	83.42
Republican	Julie Robben Lineberry	2,603	16.29
Write-in		46	0.29
Total votes		15,976	100.0
Democratic hold			
