= Harvey Morgan =

American politician (born 1930)

Member of the Virginia House of Delegates
- In office January 9, 1980 – January 11, 2012
- Preceded by: John Warren Cooke
- Succeeded by: Keith Hodges
- Constituency: 48th district (1980‍–‍1982); 44th district (1982‍–‍1983); 98th district (1983‍–‍2012)

Personal details
- Born: Harvey Bland Morgan; August 18, 1930 (age 96) Gloucester, Virginia, U.S.
- Party: Republican
- Spouse: Mary Helen Osborn
- Children: Gayle Vail
- Education: Hampden-Sydney College; Medical College of Virginia
- Occupation: Pharmacist; professor; politician

Military service
- Branch/service: United States Navy
- Years of service: 1955–1957

Harvey Bland Morgan (born August 18, 1930) is an American politician. From 1980–2012 he served in the Virginia House of Delegates, representing the 98th district on the Middle Peninsula. He is a member of the Republican Party.
