= Virginia's 49th House of Delegates district =

Virginia legislative district

District map from the 2023 election

Virginia's 49th House of Delegates district elects one of the 100 members of the Virginia House of Delegates, the lower house of the state's bicameral legislature. The 49th district covers parts of Pittsylvania County including the independent city of Danville, and Halifax county including the city of South Boston.

The seat is held by Republican Madison Whittle.

== Elections ==
=== 2019 ===
In 2019, incumbent Democrat Alfonso Lopez defeated a primary challenge from JD Spain, president of the Arlington NAACP chapter. Lopez won the general election with 83% of the vote.

=== 2021 ===
Lopez faces another primary challenge, from preschool teacher Karishma Mehta. Mehta has been endorsed by Democracy for America and Democratic Socialists of America.

== List of delegates ==
Delegate	Party	Years	Electoral history
Adam Ebbin	Democratic	January 14, 2004 – January 11, 2012	Retired to run for Virginia's 30th Senate district.
Alfonso H. Lopez	Democratic	January 11, 2012 – January 10, 2024	First elected in 2011 Redistricted to the 3rd district.
Danny Marshall	Republican	January 10, 2024 – January 14, 2026	Redistricted from the 14th district.
Madison Whittle	Republican	January 14, 2026 – present	First elected in 2025
