= Israel O'Quinn =

American politician (born 1980)

Israel D. O'Quinn
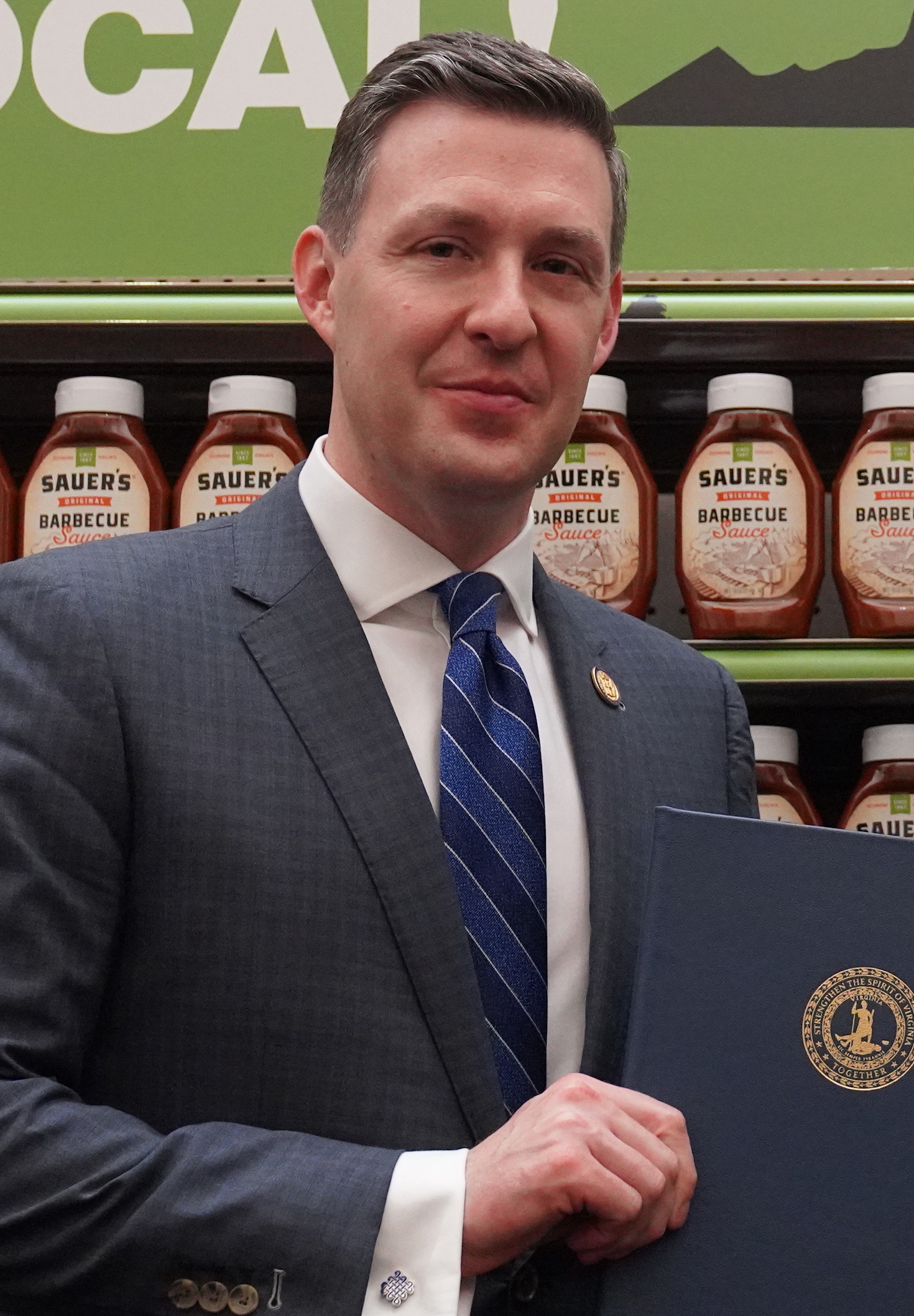
- O'Quinn in 2022

Member of the Virginia House of Delegates
- Incumbent
- Assumed office January 11, 2012
- Preceded by: C. W. Carrico
- Constituency: 5th district (2012–2024); 44th district (2024–present)

Personal details
- Born: March 5, 1980 (age 46) Abingdon, Virginia, U.S.
- Party: Republican
- Spouse: Emily Lauren Gentry
- Education: Emory and Henry College (BA)
- Occupation: Businessperson
- Committees: Privileges and Elections; Commerce and Labor; Militia, Police and Public Safety
- Website: www.israeloquinn.com

Israel Dean O'Quinn (born March 5, 1980) is an American politician. A Republican, he was elected to the Virginia House of Delegates in 2011. He currently represents the 44th district, made up of the cities of Bristol and Galax, Grayson County, and parts of Smyth and Washington counties in the southwestern part of the state.

== Early life, education, business career ==
O'Quinn graduated from Patrick Henry High School; he went on to receive a B.A. degree in political science and history from Emory and Henry College in 2002. After graduation, he worked in the office of the Attorney General of Virginia, Jerry Kilgore, and on several political campaigns. In 2006, he was hired by K-VA-T Food Stores, owners of the K-VA-T Food City regional supermarket chain, and currently serves as Director of the company's Office of Strategic Initiatives, in addition to chairing the company's Energy Conservation Committee.

O'Quinn is married to Emily Lauren Gentry, a corporate communications professional.

== House of Delegates ==
In 2011, O'Quinn ran for the 5th district nomination when the incumbent, C. W. Carrico, decided to run for the state senate. He defeated independent candidate Michael D. Osborne in the general election, with 12,166 votes to 5,338. In 2019, Osborne challenged O'Quinn for the Republican nomination for the 5th district, citing concerns with a casino proposed in Bristol and tolls on Interstate 81. O'Quinn introduced legislation in January 2019 that would allow residents of Bristol to vote in a referendums to allow a proposed casino to open and operate in the former Bristol Mall. O'Quinn defeated Osborne, with 2,449 votes to 721. O'Quinn ran unopposed in the November general election.

== Electoral history ==
Date	Election	Candidate	Party	Votes	%
Virginia House of Delegates, Washington, Scott and Bristol city district
Virginia House of Delegates, 5th district
Nov 8, 2011	General	Israel D. O'Quinn	Republican	12,166	69.28
Nov 8, 2011	General	Michael D. "Oz" Osborne		5,338	30.40
Nov 8, 2011	General	Write Ins		55	0.31
Nov 8, 2011	General	C. W. Carrico retired to run for Senate; seat remained Republican			
Nov 5, 2013	General	Israel D. O'Quinn	Republican	16,771	98.7
Nov 5, 2013	General	Write Ins		224	1.3
Nov 3, 2015	General	Israel D. O'Quinn	Republican	12,771	98.7
Nov 3, 2015	General	Write Ins		169	1.3
Nov 7, 2017	General	Israel D. O'Quinn	Republican	18,402	97.3
Nov 7, 2017	General	Write Ins		518	2.7
Jun 11, 2019	Republican; Primary	Israel D. O'Quinn	Republican	2,449	77.3
Jun 11, 2019	Republican; Primary	Michael D. Osborne	Republican	721	22.7
Nov 5, 2019	General	Israel D. O'Quinn	Republican	18,487	97.65
Nov 5, 2019	General	Write Ins		444	2.35
