= Phil Hernandez =

American politician from Virginia

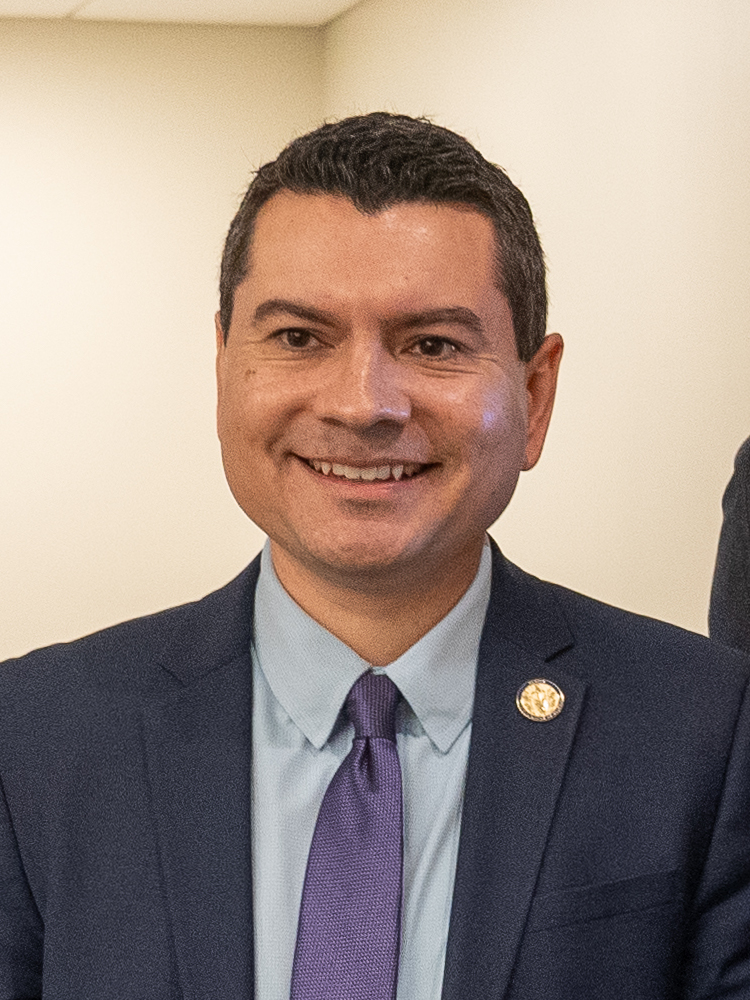

Member of the Virginia House of Delegates from the 94th district
- Incumbent
- Assumed office January 10, 2024
- Preceded by: Shelly Simonds (redistricting)

Personal details
- Born: 1987 (age 38–39) Hampton Roads, Virginia, U.S.
- Party: Democratic
- Spouse: Sara (m. 2015)
- Children: 2
- Education: College of William & Mary (BA); University of California, Berkeley (JD)

Phil M. Hernandez (born 1987) is an American politician serving as a member of the Virginia House of Delegates from the 94th district since 2024. A Democrat, he previously practiced civil rights law and served as a senior policy analyst in the Obama Administration.

== Early life and education ==
Hernandez was born and raised in the Hampton Roads; his father had served in the U.S. Navy and was of Mexican American descent while his mother was originally from Pennsylvania. His sister was born deaf and he is fluent in American sign language.

He received a Gates Millennium Scholarship and graduated from College of William & Mary with a Bachelor of Arts, where he studied abroad at Oxford University. He earned a Juris Doctor from the University of California, Berkeley's School of Law.

== Career ==
He served as a senior policy analyst in the United States Domestic Policy Council during the Obama Administration, working on clean air, clean water, and clean energy issues. He went on to work as a civil rights attorney including at the National Employment Law Project.

=== Virginia House of Delegates ===
Hernandez was the Democratic nominee for the 100th district in 2019, when he was narrowly defeated by Republican incumbent Robert Bloxom Jr.

He ran again in 2023 in the 94th district, a new seat created by redistricting. He defeated Republican candidate Andy Pittman in the general election.

Hernandez won re-election a fourth time in 2025, defeating challenger Andy Pitman by a margin of 22.65%.
