= Madison Whittle =

American politician

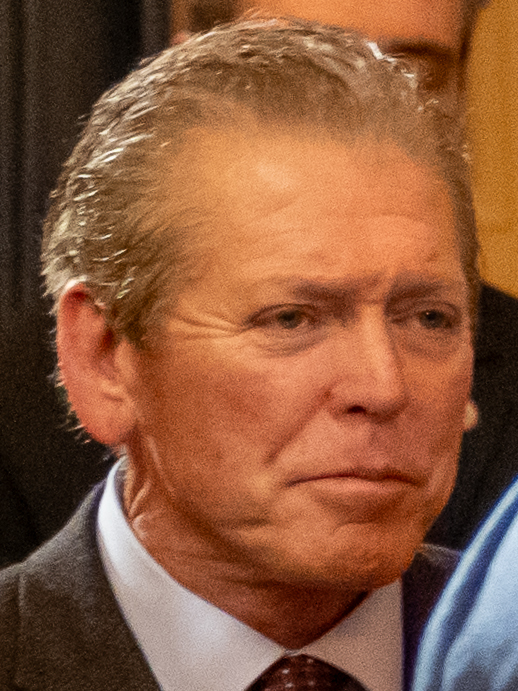

Member of the Virginia House of Delegates from the 49th district
- Incumbent
- Assumed office January 14, 2026
- Preceded by: Danny Marshall

Danville City Council Member
- In office 2017–2026

Personal details
- Born: Danville, Virginia
- Party: Republican
- Website: whittlefordelegate.com

Madison John Redd Whittle is an American politician who was elected as a member of the Virginia House of Delegates in 2025. He is a member of the Republican Party.

== Electoral History ==
=== 2025 ===
2025 House of Delegates District 49 Election
Primary election
Party	Candidate	Votes	%
Republican	Madison Whittle	2,855	85.20
Republican	Vanessa Reynolds Scearce	496	14.80
Total votes		3,351	100.00
General election
Republican	Madison Whittle	15,206	52.91
Democratic	Gary Miller	13,479	46.90
Total votes		28,685	99.81
