= Virginia's 5th House of Delegates district =

Virginia legislative district

Virginia's 5th State House of Delegates district
- District map from the 2023 election
Delegate
Kirk McPike; D–Alexandria
- Demographics: 56% White; 17% Black; 16% Hispanic; 5% Asian; 0% Native American; 0% Hawaiian/Pacific Islander; 1% Other; 5% Multiracial
- Population (2024) • Voting age: 87,801; 18
- Registered voters: 69,205

Virginia's 5th House of Delegates district is one of 100 seats in the Virginia House of Delegates, the lower house of the state's bicameral legislature. District 5 covers portions of the city of Alexandria. The district has been represented by Democratic Delegate Kirk McPike since 2026.

== District officeholders ==
Years	Delegate	Party	Electoral history
1996 – January 9, 2002	John H. Tate Jr.	Democratic	
January 9, 2002 – January 11, 2012	Charles William Carrico Sr.	Republican	Declined to seek reelection; Elected to Virginia State Senate
January 11, 2012 – January 10, 2024	Israel O'Quinn	Republican	First elected in 2012. Redistricted to the 44th District
January 10, 2024 – February 10, 2026	Elizabeth Bennett-Parker	Democratic	Redistricted from 45th District
February 10, 2026 – present	Kirk McPike	Democratic	By special election

== Electoral history ==
2015 General Election, Virginia 5th House of Delegates
Party	Candidate	Votes	%	±%
Republican	Israel O'Quinn	12,771	100.00%	n/a
Total votes		12,771	100.00%	n/a

2016 General Election, Presidential
Party	Candidate	Votes	%	±%
Republican	Donald Trump	24,059	76.27%	n/a
Democratic	Hillary Clinton	6,440	20.42%	n/a
Libertarian	Gary Johnson	600	1.90%	n/a
Independent	Evan McMullin	286	0.91%	n/a
Green	Jill Stein	156	0.49%	n/a
Total votes		31,541	100.00%	n/a
