= Virginia Senate =

Upper house of the Virginia General Assembly

Coordinates: 37°32′20.3″N 77°26′1.7″W

Senate of Virginia
- 164th Virginia General Assembly
- Coat of arms of the Virginia Senate

- Seal of the Virginia Senate

Type
- Type: Upper House
- Term limits: None

History
- New session started: January 14, 2026

Leadership
- President: Ghazala Hashmi (D) since January 17, 2026
- President pro tempore: L. Louise Lucas (D) since January 8, 2020
- Majority Leader: Scott Surovell (D) since January 10, 2024
- Minority Leader: Ryan McDougle (R) since January 10, 2024

Structure
- Seats: 40
- Political groups: Majority: Democratic (21); Minority: Republican (19)
- Length of term: 4 years
- Authority: Article IV, Virginia Constitution
- Salary: $18,000/year + per diem

Elections
- Last election: November 7, 2023 (40 seats)
- Next election: November 2, 2027 (40 seats)
- Redistricting: Commission

Meeting place
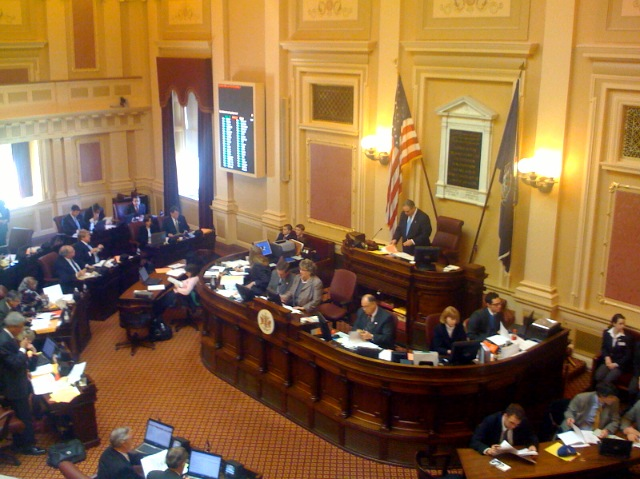
- State Senate Chamber; Virginia State Capitol; Richmond, Virginia

Website
- Virginia General Assembly

The Senate of Virginia is the upper house of the Virginia General Assembly. The Senate is composed of 40 senators representing an equal number of single-member constituent districts. The Senate is presided over by the lieutenant governor of Virginia. Prior to the American War of Independence, the upper house of the General Assembly was represented by the Virginia Governor's Council, consisting of up to 12 executive counselors appointed by the colonial royal governor as advisers and jurists.

The lieutenant governor presides daily over the Virginia Senate. In the lieutenant governor's absence, the president pro tempore presides, usually a powerful member of the majority party. The Senate is equal with the House of Delegates, the lower chamber of the legislature, except that taxation bills must originate in the House, similar to the federal U.S. Congress. The 40 senatorial districts in Virginia elect their representatives every four years on the Tuesday following the first Monday in November. The last election took place in November 2023. There are no term limits for senators. The Senate also employs 36 pages (ages 13–14) to help with daily tasks during each general session in a full-time residential program.

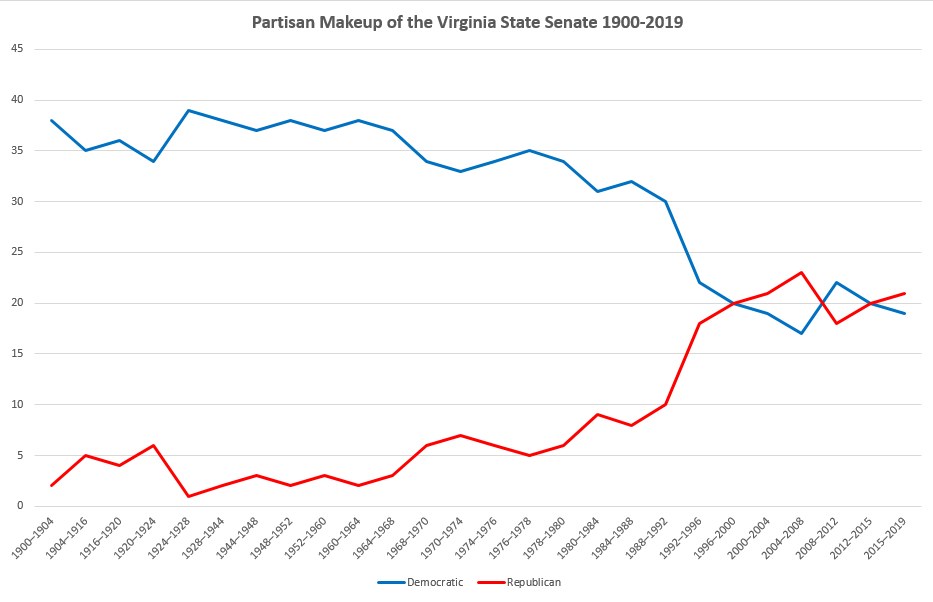
Partisan makeup of the Virginia State Senate, 1900–2019

== History ==
The Senate of Virginia was created by the 1776 Constitution of Virginia, and originally consisted of twenty-four members. Along with the House of Delegates, the Senate comprised a new bicameral legislature designed to replace the colonial Virginia House of Burgesses, which formally dissolved on May 6, 1776. The Senate replaced the legislative functions of the appointed Virginia Council of State.

Pursuant to the original Virginia Constitution, the Senate was only permitted to file amendments, while the House of Delegates had the power to propose bills. Accordingly, the Senate had far less power than the House, until the revised Virginia constitution of 1851 allowed the Senate to propose new laws.

In the 2007 elections, the Democratic Party reclaimed the majority in the Senate for the first time since 1995, when the Republican Party gained a 20–20 split. The Republicans took control of the Senate for the first time in history after a January 1998 special election. The 2011 elections resulted in a 20–20 split between the parties, but as the tie breaker was Republican lieutenant governor Bill Bolling, the Republicans effectively regained control.

After the 2013 elections, Democratic state senator Ralph Northam became the lieutenant governor, but the Democrats did not regain control of the chamber until January 28, 2014, following a series of special elections including that of Northam's vacated 6th district seat. The Democratic majority would prove short-lived, however, as Senator Phil Puckett (D-38th) resigned, effective June 8, handing the GOP a majority of 20 to 19. The Republicans solidified their majority following a special election win on August 19, 2014, which increased their total number of seats to 21.

The Democratic Party regained control of Senate after the 2019 election and new members were sworn into office on January 8, 2020. As the legislative session opened, L. Louise Lucas was elected as the first female and first African American president pro tempore.

== Salary and qualifications ==
The annual salary for senators is $18,000 per year, and will rise to $50,000 per year starting upon the taking office of senators after the 2027 Virginia Senate election. To qualify for office, senators must be at least 21 years of age at the time of the election, residents of the district they represent, and qualified to vote for General Assembly legislators. The regular session of the General Assembly is 60 days long during even numbered years and 30 days long during odd numbered years, unless extended by a two-thirds vote of both houses.

== Composition ==
=== Historical composition ===
Affiliation	Party (Shading indicates majority caucus)	
Affiliation	Democratic	Republican
1900–1904	38	2
1904–1916	35	5
1916–1920	36	4
1920–1924	34	6
1924–1928	39	1
1928–1944	38	2
1944–1948	37	3
1948–1952	38	2
1952–1960	37	3
1960–1964	38	2
1964–1968	37	3
1968–1970	34	6
1970–1974	33	7
1974–1976	34	6
1976–1978	35	5
1978–1980	34	6
1980–1984	31	9
1984–1988	32	8
1988–1992	30	10
1992–1996	22	18
1996–2000	20	20
2000–2004	19	21
2004–2008	17	23
2008–2012	22	18
2012–2016	20	20
2016–2020	19	21
2020–2024	22	18
2024–2028	21	19

=== Current session ===
↓
19	21
Republican	Democratic

Affiliation	Party (Shading indicates majority caucus)			Total	Vacant
Affiliation	Democratic	Republican		Total	Vacant
2016–2020 legislative session	19	21		40	0
End	19	20		39	1
2020–2024 legislative session (Note: Republican Amanda Chase announced in 2019 that she would not caucus with the Republicans in the upcoming Senate session, but would remain a Republican.)	21	18	1	40	0
End	22	16	1	39	1
Start of 2024–2028 legislative session	21	19		40	0
January 3, 2025 (Note: Republican John McGuire (District 10) and Democrat Suhas Subramanyam (District 32) resigned after being elected to Congress.)	20	18		38	2
January 15, 2025 (Note: Republican Luther Cifers and Kannan Srinivasan sworn in to succeed McGuire and Subramanyam, respectively.)	21	19		40	0
January 17, 2026 (Note: Democrat Ghazala Hashmi (District 15) resigned to take office as Lieutenant Governor of Virginia. Democrat Michael Jones sworn in to succeed Hashmi the same day.)	21	19		40	0
February 17, 2026 (Note: Democrat Adam Ebbin (District 39) resigned to take a job in Gov. Abigail Spanberger's administration.)	20	19		39	1
February 18, 2026 (Note: Democrat Elizabeth Bennett-Parker sworn in to succeed Ebbin.)	21	19		40	0
Latest voting share	52.5%	47.5%			

Senate districts and party affiliation after the 2023 election Democratic Party Republican Party

== Leadership ==
Lieutenant Governor	Ghazala Hashmi
President pro tempore	L. Louise Lucas
Majority Leader	Scott Surovell
Majority Whip	Barbara Favola
Minority Leader	Ryan McDougle
Minority Whip	Bill Stanley (politician)

=== Committee chairs and ranking members ===
The Senate of Virginia has 10 Standing Committees and a Committee on Rules.

Committee	Chair	Ranking Minority Member
Agriculture, Conservation and Natural Resources	Dave Marsden	
Commerce and Labor	Creigh Deeds	
Courts of Justice	Scott Surovell	
Education and Health	Barbara Favola	
Finance and Appropriations	L. Louise Lucas	
General Laws and Technology	Jeremy McPike	
Local Government	Lashrecse Aird	
Privileges and Elections	Aaron Rouse	
Rehabilitation and Social Services	Schuyler VanValkenburg	
Rules	Mamie Locke	
Transportation	Lamont Bagby	

== Members ==
District	Name	Party	Areas represented		Start
District	Name	Party	Counties	Cities	Start
1	Timmy French	Republican	Clarke, Frederick, Shenandoah, Warren	Winchester	2023
2	Mark Obenshain	Republican	Augusta (part), Bath, Highland, Page, Rockingham	Harrisonburg	2003
3	Chris Head	Republican	Alleghany, Augusta (part), Bedford (part), Botetourt, Craig, Roanoke (part), Rockbridge	Buena Vista, Covington, Lexington, Staunton, Waynesboro	2023
4	Dave Suetterlein	Republican	Montgomery (part), Roanoke (part)	Roanoke, Salem	2015
5	Travis Hackworth	Republican	Bland, Giles, Montgomery (part), Pulaski, Smyth, Tazewell, Wythe (part)	Radford	2021 (special)
6	Todd Pillion	Republican	Buchanan, Dickenson, Lee, Russell, Scott, Washington, Wise	Bristol, Norton	2019
7	Bill Stanley	Republican	Carroll, Floyd, Franklin, Grayson, Henry, Patrick, Wythe (part)	Martinsville, Galax	2011 (special)
8	Mark Peake	Republican	Bedford (part), Campbell	Lynchburg	2017 (special)
9	Tammy Brankley Mulchi	Republican	Charlotte, Halifax, Lunenburg, Mecklenburg, Nottoway, Pittsylvania, Prince Edward (part)	Danville	2024 (special)
10	Luther Cifers	Republican	Amelia, Appomattox, Buckingham, Cumberland, Fluvanna, Goochland, Hanover (part), Louisa (part), Powhatan, Prince Edward (part)		2025 (special)
11	Creigh Deeds	Democratic	Albemarle, Amherst, Louisa (part), Nelson	Charlottesville	2001 (special)
12	Glen Sturtevant	Republican	Chesterfield (part)	Colonial Heights	2015
13	Lashrecse Aird	Democratic	Charles City, Dinwiddie (part), Henrico (part), Prince George, Surry, Sussex	Hopewell, Petersburg	2023
14	Lamont Bagby	Democratic	Henrico (part)	Richmond (part)	2023 (special)
15	Michael Jones	Democratic	Chesterfield (part)	Richmond (part)	2026 (special)
16	Schuyler VanValkenburg	Democratic	Henrico (part)		2023
17	Emily Jordan	Republican	Brunswick, Dinwiddie (part), Greensville, Isle of Wight, Southampton	Chesapeake (part), Emporia, Franklin, Portsmouth (part), Suffolk	2023
18	Louise Lucas	Democratic		Chesapeake (part), Portsmouth (part)	1991
19	Christie New Craig	Republican		Chesapeake (part), Virginia Beach (part)	2023
20	Bill DeSteph	Republican	Accomack, Northampton	Norfolk (part), Virginia Beach (part)	2015
21	Angelia Williams Graves	Democratic		Norfolk (part)	2023
22	Aaron Rouse	Democratic		Virginia Beach (part)	2023 (special)
23	Mamie Locke	Democratic		Hampton, Newport News (part)	2003
24	Danny Diggs	Republican	James City (part), York	Newport News (part), Poquoson, Williamsburg	2023
25	Richard Stuart	Republican	Caroline, Essex, King & Queen (part), King George, King William, Lancaster, Middlesex, Northumberland, Richmond, Spotsylvania (part), Westmoreland		2007
26	Ryan McDougle	Republican	Gloucester, Hanover (part), James City (part), King & Queen (part), Mathews, New Kent		2006 (special)
27	Tara Durant	Republican	Spotsylvania (part), Stafford (part)	Fredericksburg	2023
28	Bryce Reeves	Republican	Culpeper, Fauquier (part), Greene, Madison, Orange, Rappahannock, Spotsylvania (part)		2011
29	Jeremy McPike	Democratic	Prince William (part), Stafford (part)		2015
30	Danica Roem	Democratic	Prince William (part)	Manassas, Manassas Park	2023
31	Russet Perry	Democratic	Fauquier (part), Loudoun (part)		2023
32	Kannan Srinivasan	Democratic	Loudoun (part)		2025 (special)
33	Jennifer Carroll Foy	Democratic	Fairfax (part), Prince William (part)		2023
34	Scott Surovell	Democratic	Fairfax (part)		2015
35	Dave Marsden	Democratic	Fairfax (part)		2010 (special)
36	Stella Pekarsky	Democratic	Fairfax (part)		2023
37	Saddam Azlan Salim	Democratic	Fairfax (part)	Fairfax, Falls Church	2023
38	Jennifer Boysko	Democratic	Fairfax (part)		2019 (special)
39	Elizabeth Bennett-Parker	Democratic	Arlington (part), Fairfax (part)	Alexandria	2026 (special)
40	Barbara Favola	Democratic	Arlington (part)		2011

== District map ==
Virginia Senate District Map (2023)

== Coat of arms ==
Coat of arms of the Senate of Virginia
Crest Issuant from a Wreath of Dogwood Flowers proper a Female Figure coupled below the shoulders also proper crined Or vested Gules garnished Gold on her head an Eastern Crown of the last Escutcheon Argent a Cross Gules between four Escutcheons each ensigned with a Royal Crown those in the first and fourth quarters emblazoned with the Arms of France (modern) quartering those of England the Escutcheon in the second quarter with the Arms of Scotland and that in the third quarter with the Arms of Ireland on the Cross an Ivory Gavel palewise proper Supporters Dexter a Cardinal Bird wings addorsed proper and sinister a Dragon wings addorsed Gules Motto "Floreat Senatus Virginiae" (Latin for "May the Senate of Virginia flourish"

The Senate of Virginia has its own coat of arms designed and granted by the College of Arms in England. The coat of arms also makes up the official seal of the Virginia Senate. It bears no resemblance to the Seal of the Commonwealth of Virginia, which is the seal of the state as a whole. The shield is based on the Coat of Arms of the Commonwealth of Virginia granted to the state in 1976 by the British College of Arms.

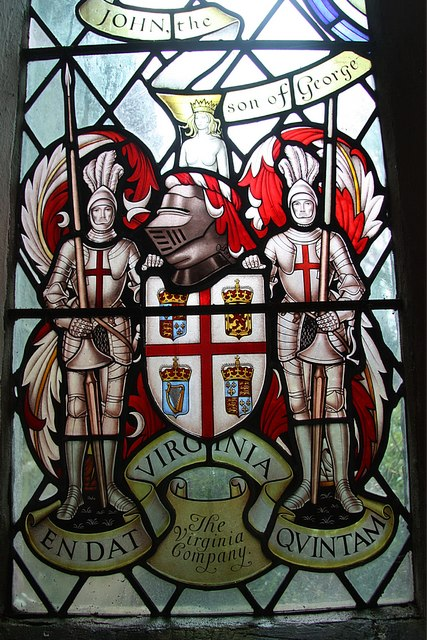
The coat of arms of the London Company.

The coat of arms adopted January 22, 1981, was designed by the College of Arms and based on the coat of arms used by the London Company, the royally-chartered English entrepreneurs who funded the European settlement of Virginia. This is not to be confused with the Seal of the London Company, for other than both devices displaying a quartered shield, there is little resemblance between them.

The Senate's arms have a shield in the center which is divided into four sections by a red cross. In each quarter are smaller shields representing the arms of four countries (England, France, Scotland, and Ireland) that contributed settlers to Virginia's early waves of European immigration.

The four coats of arms, a small crest of a crowned female head with unbound hair representing Queen Elizabeth (the Virgin Queen who named Virginia), and the dragon (part of the Elizabethan royal seal of England) represent Virginia's European heritage.

An ivory gavel emblazoned on the vertical arm of the red cross represents the Senate as a law making body. The cardinal and dogwood depicted are Virginia's official state bird and tree. The ribbon contains the Latin motto of the Senate, Floreat Senatus Virginiae, which means "May the Senate of Virginia flourish."

== See also ==
- List of Virginia state legislatures
