= Keith Hodges =

American politician (born 1966)

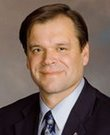

Member of the Virginia House of Delegates
- Incumbent
- Assumed office January 11, 2012
- Preceded by: Harvey Morgan
- Constituency: 98th district (2012–2024); 68th district (2024–present)

Personal details
- Born: Myron Keith Hodges; May 6, 1966 (age 60) Richmond, Virginia, U.S.
- Party: Republican
- Spouse: Shelley Gaye Williams
- Children: 2
- Education: Medical College of Virginia
- Occupation: Pharmacist
- Committees: Counties, Cities and Towns; Health, Welfare and Institutions
- Website: www.votekeithhodges.com

Myron Keith Hodges (born May 6, 1966) is an American politician. A Republican, he was elected to the Virginia House of Delegates in 2011. He currently represents the 68th district, made up of the Middle Peninsula counties of Essex, Gloucester, King and Queen, Mathews and Middlesex, and part of King William County.

== Early life and education ==
Hodges was born in Richmond, Virginia and raised on the Middle Peninsula. He received a B.S. degree from the Medical College of Virginia School of Pharmacy in 1989. He currently operates the Gloucester Pharmacy.

== Political career ==
The 98th district incumbent, Republican Harvey Morgan, retired in 2011. Hodges won a four-way primary for the Republican nomination with 40.92% of the vote. He then defeated Democratic candidate Andy Shoukas with 16,647 votes to Shoukas' 4,556. Hodges ran for re-election in 2013 against Independent candidate Geneva Putt. He won with 75.4% of the vote. Hodges ran as an unopposed candidate in 2015, winning with 100% of the vote. He acquired 65.05% of the vote in 2017, defeating Democrat Sheila Crowley.

In 2022, Hodges was promoted to chair of the Counties Cities and Towns Committee.

== Personal life ==
Hodges married Shelley Gaye Williams c.1990. They have two daughters, Chloe and Ella. Chloe attends Randolph-Macon College in Ashland, Virginia, and she is a cheerleader for their football team.
