= Karen Hamilton =

American politician

Member of the Virginia House of Delegates from the 62nd district
- Incumbent
- Assumed office January 14, 2026
- Preceded by: Nick Freitas

Personal details
- Party: Republican
- Spouse: Cameron Hamilton
- Education: University of North Carolina, Charlotte (BS)
- Website: Campaign website

Karen Hamilton is an American politician who was elected as a member of the Virginia House of Delegates in 2025. She is a member of the Republican Party.
