= Nicole Cole =

American politician

Member of the Virginia House of Delegates from the 66th district
- Incumbent
- Assumed office January 14, 2026
- Preceded by: Bobby Orrock

Spotsylvania County School Board Member (Battlefield)
- In office 2022–2026

Personal details
- Born: 1970 (age 55–56) Hampton, Virginia
- Party: Democratic
- Website: www.nicolecole.com

Nicole Cole is an American politician who was elected as a member of the Virginia House of Delegates in 2025. A member of the Democratic Party, she defeated 35-year incumbent Republican Bobby Orrock by a margin of 4.39%. At the time, Orrock had been the longest serving member of the Virginia House of Delegates.

She was previously a member of the School Board of Spotsylvania County Public Schools.
