= Adele McClure =

American politician from Virginia

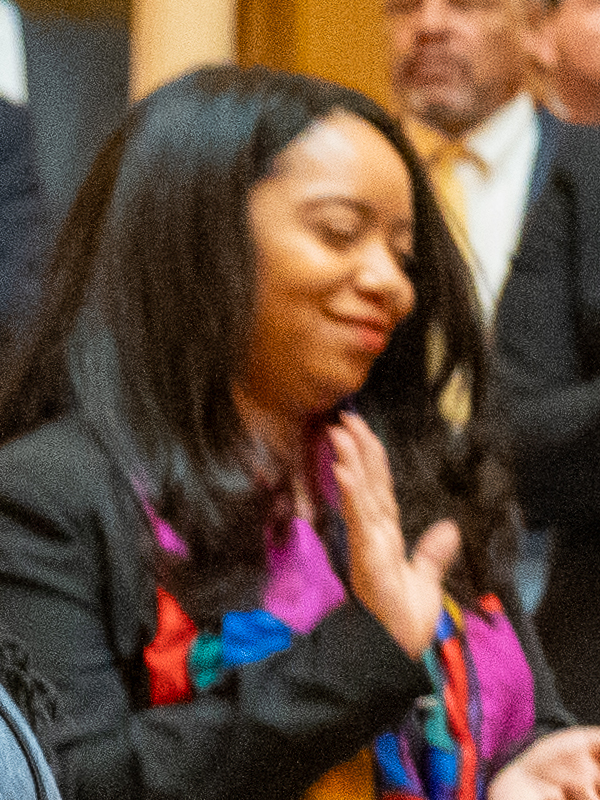

Member of the Virginia House of Delegates from the 2nd district
- Incumbent
- Assumed office January 10, 2024
- Preceded by: Candi King (redistricted)

Personal details
- Born: 1989 or 1990 (age 36–37) Yuma, Arizona, U.S.
- Party: Democratic
- Education: Virginia Commonwealth University (BS)

Adele Y. McClure is an American politician serving as a member of the Virginia House of Delegates from the 2nd district since 2024. A Democrat, she previously served as executive director of the Virginia Legislative Black Caucus, as Associate Director of Eviction Prevention at the Virginia Department of Housing and Community Development, and as policy director for former lieutenant governor Justin Fairfax.

== Early life and education ==
McClure was born in Yuma, Arizona; her mother raised her and worked as an early childhood care provider while her father was an immigrant from the Philippines who served in the U.S. Army. She grew up in the Fairfax County portion of Alexandria and said she experienced hunger and periodic homelessness. During high school, she worked three jobs and took care of her family.

She is a first generation college graduate, earning a Bachelor of Science in economics from Virginia Commonwealth University in 2011.

== Political career ==
Prior to her election to the Virginia House of Delegates, McClure was the executive director of the Virginia Legislative Black Caucus. She worked under lieutenant governor Justin Fairfax as a policy director, but resigned after he was accused of sexual misconduct. She also ran the Department of Housing & Community Development first eviction-prevention program. McClure was featured on the 2019 Forbes 30 Under 30 Law & Policy list.

=== Virginia House of Delegates ===
McClure first ran for the Virginia House of Delegates in 2023 to represent the 2nd district, a new district created from redistricting based in Arlington County. She won the Democratic primary unopposed after her two opponents, Kevin Saucedo-Broach and Nicole Merlene, withdrew from the race and was unopposed in the general election. She was first Black person since Reconstruction and the first Asian person elected to represent Arlington County in the Virginia House of Delegates.

In 2025, EMILY's List awarded McClure with the 15th annual Gabrielle Giffords Rising Star Award.

==== Tenure ====
In 2024, she supported legislation to implement single-stair reform in multi-family residential buildings as part of an effort to increase housing supply. In 2026, McClure introduced legislation to require companies to pay farm workers minimum wage.

As of 2026, McClure serves as the vice-chair of the Public Safety Committee, and as a member of the House General Laws Committee and the Transportation Committee Meeting.

== Personal life ==
She has a daughter, born in 2024. She identifies as Baptist.
