= Virginia's 98th House of Delegates district =

Virginia legislative district

Virginia's 98th State House of Delegates district
- District map from the 2023 election
Delegate
Andrew Rice; R–Virginia Beach
- Demographics: 72.4% White; 9.8% Black; 7.8% Hispanic; 5.6% Asian; 2.6% Other
- Population (2020): 87,497
- Registered voters (2024): 63,970

Virginia's 98th House of Delegates district, or HD98, elects one of the 100 members of the Virginia House of Delegates, the lower house of the state's bicameral legislature. The district is made of southeastern Virginia Beach.

As of 2026, the district is represented by Andrew Rice since a special election after Republican Barry Knight died on February 19, 2026.

== History ==
Prior to redistricting in 2021, HD98 represented most of the Middle Peninsula; the current version of the district is composed of the former 21st, 81st and 84th districts.

== List of delegates ==
Delegate	Party	Years	Electoral history
Harvey Morgan	Republican	January 12, 1983 – January 11, 2012	Did not seek reelection
Keith Hodges	Republican	January 11, 2012 – 2024	First elected in 2011
Barry Knight	Republican	January 8, 2009 – February 19, 2026	Redistricted
Andrew Rice	Republican	March 17, 2026 – Present	Elected in special election
