= Luther Cifers =

American politician

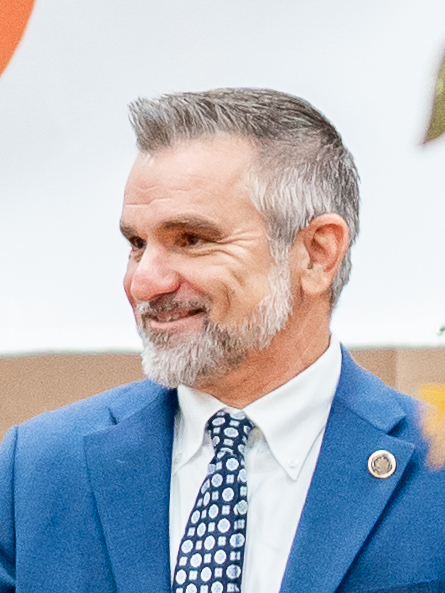
- Cifers in 2025

Member of the Virginia Senate from the 10th district
- Incumbent
- Assumed office January 15, 2025
- Preceded by: John McGuire

Personal details
- Born: Luther Henry Cifers III; June 5, 1974 (age 52) Amelia, Virginia, U.S.
- Party: Republican
- Spouse: Anastasiia Cifers
- Website: Campaign website

Luther Henry Cifers III (born June 5, 1974) is an American politician and entrepreneur. He is currently a Virginia State Senator, representing Virginia's 10th Senate District. He was elected in a 2025 special election to replace John McGuire with 58% of the vote, defeating Democrat Jack Trammell. He represents 11 counties, including Goochland, Prince Edward, and Fluvanna in the State Senate.

== Early life ==
Cifers was born and raised in Amelia County, Virginia, in 1974. At 10 years old, he began working in nearby tobacco fields and farms, and later in construction. He was homeschooled from the third grade.

== Political career ==
=== Campaigns ===
Cifers announced his intention to run for the 10th District Special Election in November 2024, after the incumbent Senator, John McGuire, was elected to Congress. In a December 13 mass meeting of 10th District Republicans, Cifers won the nomination on the third round of voting in an upset. He bested 6 other candidates, including former State Senator Amanda Chase, 2023 10th District Candidate Duane Adams, and Republican activist Jean Gannon. In the general election, Cifers faced Democrat Jack Trammell, a Professor who ran for Congress in 2014. Cifers defeated Trammell 58–42 on January 7, 2025.

=== State Senate ===
Cifers was sworn in to the Virginia Senate on January 15, 2025, in the Senate chamber.
