= Michael Jones (Virginia politician) =

American politician from Virginia

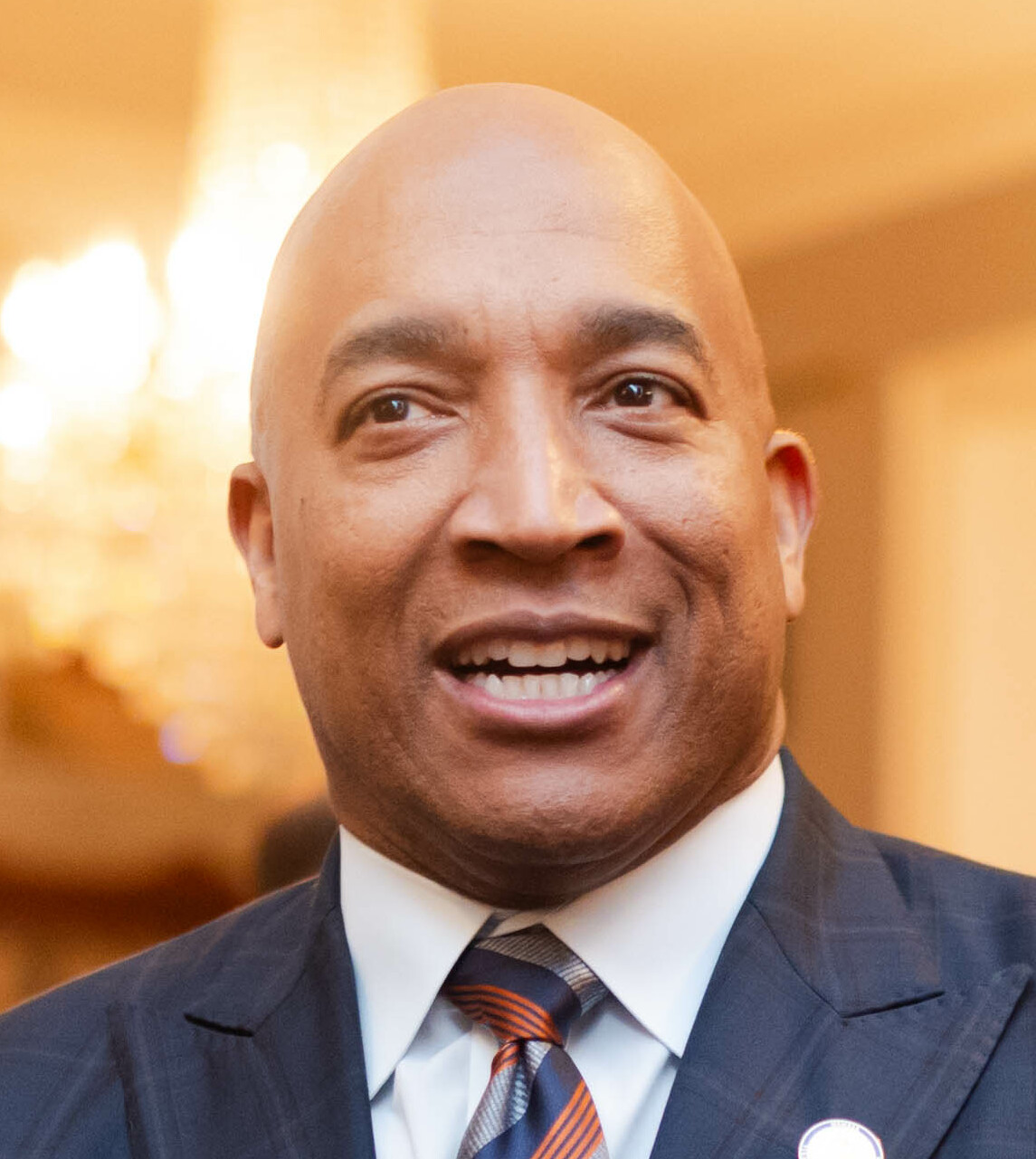
- Jones in 2024

Member of the Virginia Senate from the 15th district
- Incumbent
- Assumed office January 17, 2026
- Preceded by: Ghazala Hashmi

Member of the Virginia House of Delegates from the 77th district
- In office January 10, 2024 – December 9, 2025
- Preceded by: Cliff Hayes Jr. (redistricting)
- Succeeded by: Charlie Schmidt

Personal details
- Born: 1967 (age 58–59)
- Party: Democratic
- Spouse(s): Tanya Jones (div. c. 2012) June Cober (m. 2019)
- Children: 3
- Education: University of Colorado Boulder (BA); Virginia Union University (MDiv); McCormick Theological Seminary (DMin)

Michael J. Jones (born 1967) is an American pastor and politician who has served in the Virginia Senate as a Democrat representing the 15th district since 2026. From 2024 to 2025, he served in the Virginia House of Delegates representing the 77th district.

== Early life and education ==
Jones was raised by a single mother.

Jones earned a Bachelor of Arts in Sociology from the University of Colorado at Boulder in 1989. He later obtained a Master of Divinity from the Samuel DeWitt Proctor School of Theology at Virginia Union University in 2001, and a Doctor of Ministry from McCormick Theological Seminary in 2007.

== Career ==
Jones formerly worked as a pastor at Fourth Baptist Church in Richmond, then founded the Village of Faith church with his then-wife Tanya Jones where he has worked as a full-time pastor since 2005. In 2018, the church had around 900 members and two locations in Sandston and Midlothian.

=== Richmond City Council ===
Jones was elected to the Richmond City Council in 2016, representing the 9th Voter District. He was re-elected in 2020 and later served as Council President.

In 2017, Jones introduced a proposal to remove Confederate statues, which did not pass. In December 2019, he introduced a resolution requesting that the Virginia General Assembly grant Richmond authority over local monuments. In January 2020, the Richmond City Council passed a resolution in support of that request.

In June 2020, amid demonstrations, Jones and Council member Stephanie Lynch supported the immediate removal of certain monuments, citing safety concerns. These discussions were part of broader city-level policy debates on the status of Confederate monuments.

During the 2020 protests against police violence, Jones, then a Richmond City Council member, introduced legislation to ban the use of tear gas, rubber bullets, and chokeholds by Richmond law enforcement. He also called for an investigation into the Richmond Police Department’s budget, including discussion of potential reallocation of funds. Jones spoke about the use of force during the protests and described the need for a shift away from a “warrior mentality” in policing.

During the COVID-19 pandemic, Jones supported the Strategic Plan for Equitable Economic Development (SPEED) which addressed disparities in education, housing, and healthcare.

He remained on the Richmond City Council until December 31, 2023, when he resigned following his election to the Virginia House of Delegates.

=== Virginia House of Delegates ===
In 2021, Jones filed to run against incumbent state delegate Betsy Carr in the Democratic primary, but was disqualified by the Virginia State Board of Elections over paperwork issues. As a member of the Virginia House of Delegates, Jones serves on the following committees: Communications, Technology and Innovation, Counties, Cities and Towns, and Labor and Commerce.

In January 2024, Nicole Jones was appointed to fill the 9th District seat. Despite sharing the same last name, they are not related.

During the 2024 legislative session, Jones introduced House Bill 22 (HB22), which banned the manufacture, importation, sale, possession, or transfer of auto sears. The law classified violations as a Class 6 felony and took effect on July 1, 2024.

In December 2024, Jones visited Red Onion State Prison following reports of self-harm among inmates. He later announced plans to introduce legislation limiting transfers of inmates to high-security facilities more than 75 miles from their home locality. The visit was part of ongoing conversations about correctional conditions in Virginia.

In 2025, Jones introduced a bill which would have restricted universities from divesting from foreign countries that are not already subject to United States government sanctions as a counter to student protests calling for universities to divest from Israel; it did not receive a hearing. He also introduced a bill which would implement a plastic bag ban in grocery stores, requiring them to encourage reusable bag usage.

Jones resigned his seat on December 9, 2025 after winning the Democratic firehouse primary for Virginia's 15th Senate district, which was vacated by Ghazala Hashmi after she was elected lieutenant governor.

=== Virginia Senate ===
On January 6, 2026, Jones won election to the 15th Senate district.

== Personal life ==
Jones was married to Tanya Jones, with whom he founded the Village of Faith church with, and the couple divorced around 2012. He married his current wife, June (née Cober), in 2019; he has two adult children and she has a daughter from previous relationships.

In March 2024, June and her daughter were granted a preliminary protective order against him following allegations of domestic abuse and harassment. A judge declined to extend the order a month later.

== Electoral history ==
2016 Richmond, Virginia city council election, District 9
Candidate	Votes	%
Michael J. Jones	4,440	57.1
Leon Benjamin	1,711	22.0
Germika Tomasiah Pegram	1,202	15.5
Marcus Omar Squires	382	4.9
Write-in	36	0.5
Total votes	7,771	100.0

2020 Richmond, Virginia city council election, District 9
Candidate	Votes	%
Michael J. Jones	7,221	98.4
Write-in	115	1.6
Total votes	7,336	100.0

Virginia's 77th House of Delegates district, 2023
Party	Candidate	Votes	%
Democratic	Michael J. Jones	18,587	91.1
Write-in		1826	8.9
Total votes		20,413	100.0
Democratic hold			
