= Sonia Vásquez Luna =

American politician from Virginia

Member of the Virginia House of Delegates from the 20th district
- Incumbent
- Assumed office TBD
- Preceded by: Michelle Maldonado

Personal details
- Born: May 6, 1982 (age 44) El Salvador
- Party: Democratic
- Children: 2
- Education: Northern Virginia Community College (AS); National Labor College (BA)
- Website: Campaign website

Sonia Ruth Vásquez Luna is a first-generation Salvadoran American union leader and politician. She serves in the Virginia House of Delegates, representing the 20th district, since a 2026 special election. A member of the Democratic Party, she previously served on the Manassas city council.

== Personal life ==
Vásquez Luna was born in El Salvador, where she lived until she was 19 years old. Prior to emigrating to the United States, she attended the University of El Salvador. On Christmas Day in 2001, her family relocated to Virginia.

She later finished her collegiate studies, receiving an Associate of Science degree from Northern Virginia Community College, followed by a Bachelor of Arts from the National Labor College.

Vásquez Luna works for the Laborers' International Union of North America (LIUNA), where she is a business manager and executive board member.

== Political career ==
In 2022, Vásquez Luna ran for Manassas city council, where she placed second, securing a seat.

Following the resignation of delegate Michelle Maldonado, she ran in the special election for her seat and won with around 70% of the vote.
