= Barry Knight (politician) =

American politician (1954–2026)

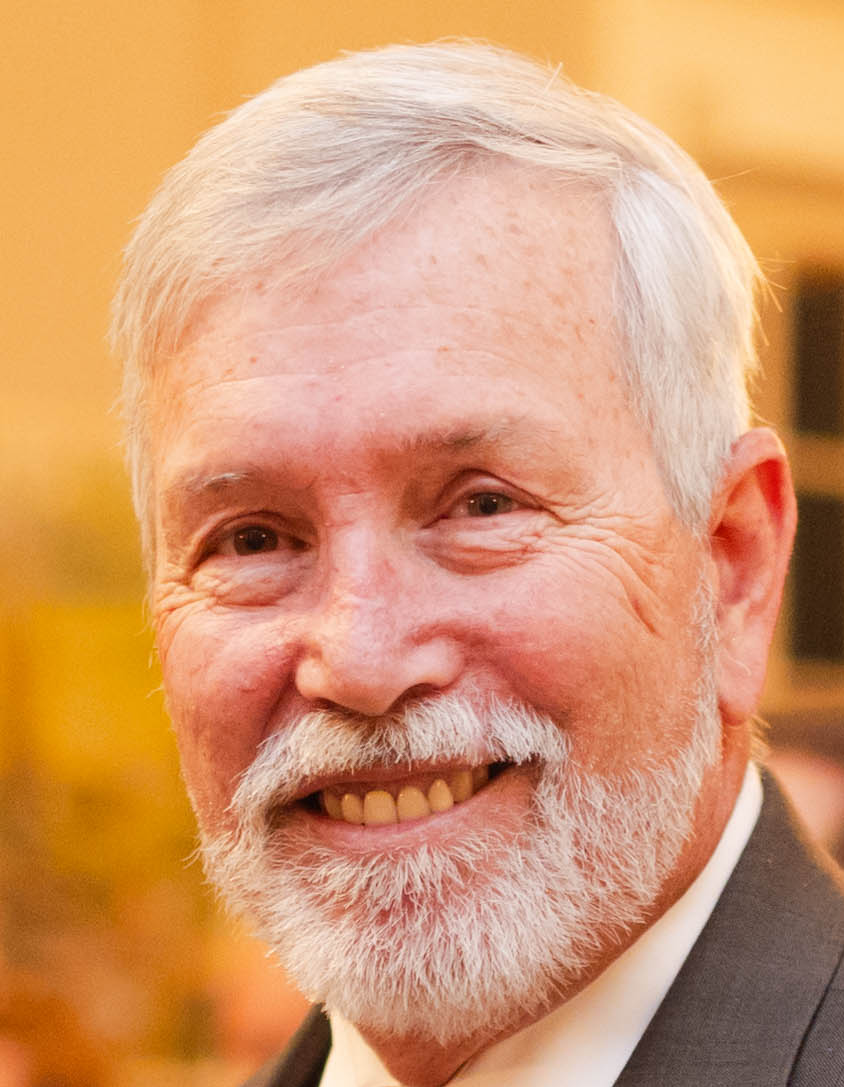

Member of the Virginia House of Delegates
- In office January 8, 2009 – February 19, 2026
- Preceded by: Terrie Suit
- Succeeded by: Andrew Rice
- Constituency: 81st district (2009–2024); 98th district (2024–2026)

Personal details
- Born: September 26, 1954 Princess Anne County, Virginia, U.S. (now Virginia Beach, Virginia, U.S.)
- Died: February 19, 2026 (aged 71)
- Party: Republican
- Spouse: Paula Jane Whitehurst
- Children: Hunter, Kyle, Forrest
- Occupation: Hog farmer
- Committees: Counties, Cities and Towns; Transportation
- Website: barrydknight.com

Barry Dean Knight (September 26, 1954 – February 19, 2026) was an American politician and farmer who served as a member of the Virginia House of Delegates from 2009 until his death in 2026. A member of the Republican Party, he was elected a member of the Virginia House of Delegates in a special election on January 6, 2009. Knight represented the 98th district, made up of parts of southeastern Virginia Beach.

== Early life ==
Knight was born and raised on a farm. After graduation from Kempsville High School, he worked as a truck driver to raise enough money to buy his own hog farm. His business, Barry D. Knight Farms, operated until 2016 and produced "as many as 25,000 finished hogs per year."

He was named the Virginia Farm Bureau's Young Farmer of the Year in 1983, and served as president of the Tidewater Pork Producers from 1984 to 1990. He was also chairman of the Southern States Cooperative, and served with the Virginia Beach Farm Bureau.

== Political career ==
Knight served on the Virginia Pork Board under governors George Allen and Jim Gilmore. He was appointed to the Virginia Beach Planning Commission in 2003, and was elected chair in 2006.

In September 2008, Delegate Terrie Suit resigned her 81st district seat to take a job as a lobbyist. Knight ran for the Republican nomination, winning a three-way primary contest on November 29 over Virginia Beach Sheriff Paul Lanteigne and Tom Keeley, a retired United States Navy officer. Knight received 1,309 votes out of 2,218 ballots cast. He went on to defeat Democratic nominee John LaCombe in the special election on January 6, 2009.

== Personal life and death ==
Knight married Paula Jane Whitehurst, in the early 1980s. They had three sons, Hunter, Kyle and Forrest. He died on February 19, 2026, at the age of 71.

== See also ==
- 2009 Virginia elections § House of Delegates
