= Garrett McGuire =

American politician from Virginia

Member of the Virginia House of Delegates from the 17th district
- Incumbent
- Assumed office January 21, 2026
- Preceded by: Mark Sickles

Personal details
- Party: Democratic
- Website: mcguirefordelegate.com

Garrett McGuire is an American politician who has been a member of the Virginia House of Delegates for the 17th district since 2026. McGuire is a public policy professional and community leader from Fairfax County, Virginia.

== Early life and education ==
McGuire was born in Washington, D.C. and received his bachelor's degree and Master of Public Administration from Virginia Tech.

== Virginia House of Delegates ==
McGuire was elected in a 2026 special election following the appointment of Mark Sickles to serve as Virginia Secretary of Finance. McGuire currently sits on the Communications, Technology and Innovation; Counties, Cities and Towns, and Health and Human Services Committees.
