= Virginia's 44th House of Delegates district =

Virginia legislative district

District map from the 2023 election

Virginia's 44th House of Delegates district elects one of 100 seats in the Virginia House of Delegates, the lower house of the state's bicameral legislature. District 44 represents the counties of Washington and Russell (partial), and the City of Bristol.

The seat is currently held by Republican Israel O'Quinn.

== Geography ==
District 44, representing Washington County, Virginia, the City of Bristol, and part of Russell County is located in Virginia's 9th Congressional District.

== Elections ==
Before the most recent redistricting, the 44th District was in Northern Virginia. Some history before the redistricting: Democrat Paul Krizek first took office in 2016, after winning an uncontested general election in November 2015. He was re-elected in 2017, again without facing an opponent. In November 2019, Krizek was challenged by Republican Richard Hayden. Krizek won the contest with 70.67% of the vote.
