= Andrew Rice (Virginia politician) =

American politician from Virginia

Member of the Virginia House of Delegates from the 98th district
- Incumbent
- Assumed office March 17, 2026
- Preceded by: Barry Knight

Personal details
- Party: Republican
- Spouse: Ellianna Harris2025 ()
- Education: Virginia Military Institute; Regent University (JD)
- Website: Campaign website

Charles Andrew Rice is an American prosecutor and politician serving as a member of the Virginia House of Delegates for the 98th district since a 2026 special election. A member of the Republican Party, he previously worked as an assistant Virginia Beach commonwealth's attorney for 12 years as of December 2024, with specializations on juvenile and domestic relations prosecutions.

Rice earned a bachelor’s degree from the Virginia Military Institute in 2009 and a Juris Doctor from Regent University School of Law in 2012.

== Career ==
=== Virginia House of Delegates ===
Rice was elected to represent Virginia's 98th House of Delegates District in a special election on March 17, 2026, following the death of incumbent Barry Knight. He currently serves on the Counties, Cities, and Towns Committee and the Transportation Committee.

== Personal life ==
Rice resides in Virginia Beach and married Ellianna Harris in 2025. They have one child.
