= Margaret Franklin (politician) =

American politician

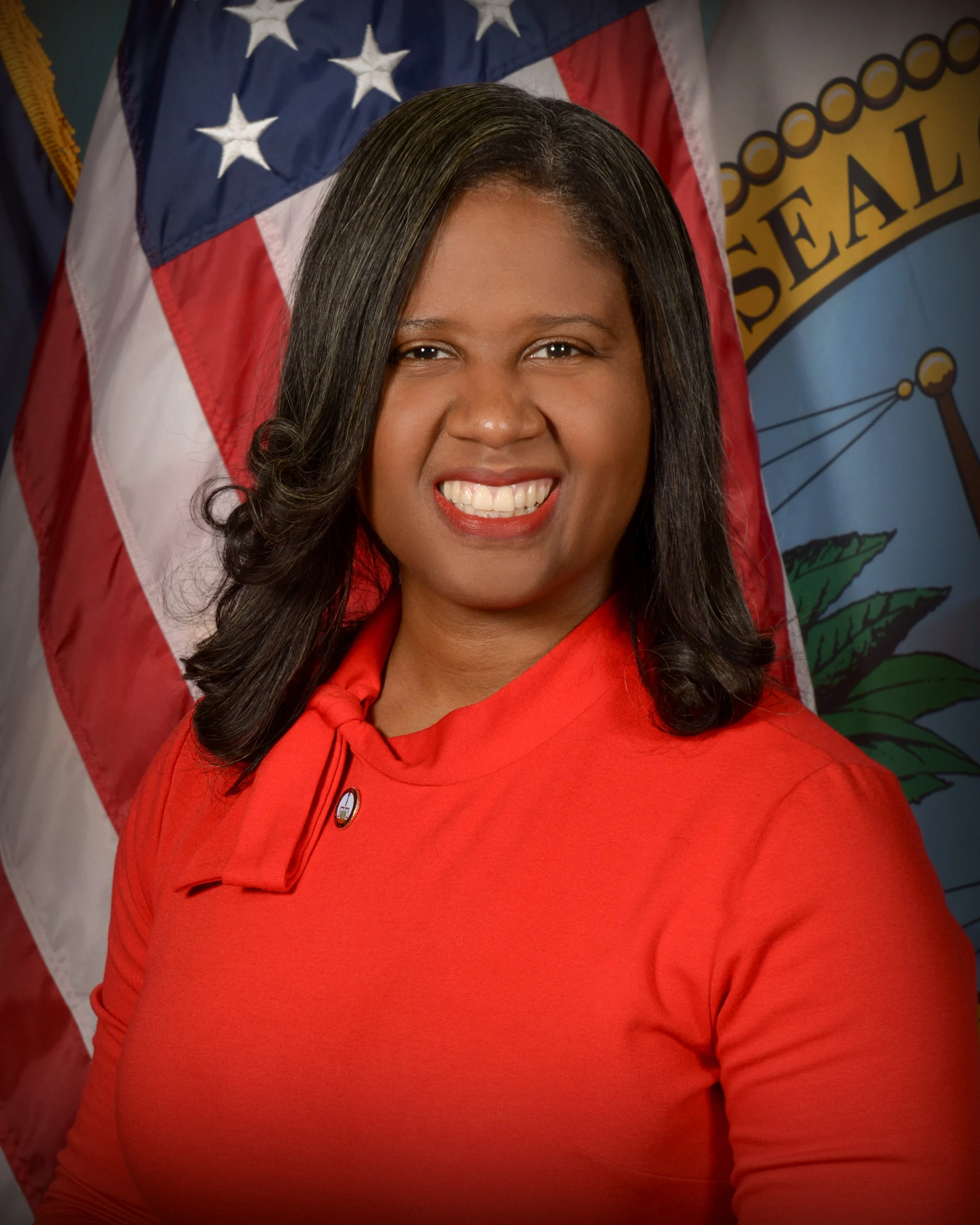

Member of the Virginia House of Delegates from the 23rd district
- Incumbent
- Assumed office January 19, 2026
- Preceded by: Candi King

Woodbridge District Supervisor
- In office January 1, 2020 – January 19, 2026
- Preceded by: Frank J. Principi
- Succeeded by: Jeannie LaCroix

Personal details
- Born: 1986 (age 39–40) Memphis, Tennessee, U.S.
- Party: Democratic
- Education: University of Tennessee at Chattanooga; Howard University
- Website: www.margaretforva.com

Margaret Angela Franklin (born 1986) is an American politician who has been a member of the Virginia House of Delegates for the 23rd district since a 2026 special election, where she replaced the incumbent Candi King She is a member of the Democratic Party and previously represented the Woodbridge district on the Prince William Board of County Supervisors.
