= Charlie Schmidt (politician) =

American politician from Virginia

Member of the Virginia House of Delegates from the 77th district
- Incumbent
- Assumed office January 14, 2026
- Preceded by: Michael Jones

Personal details
- Party: Democratic
- Website: charlie4va.com

Charlie Schmidt is an American politician who was elected as a member of the Virginia House of Delegates from the 77th district in 2026. He represents parts of southern Richmond and northern Chesterfield.

Schmidt is a former attorney for the American Civil Liberties Union and self-described progressive Democrat.
