= Virginia House of Delegates =

Lower house of the Virginia General Assembly

Coordinates: 37°32′19″N 77°26′0″W

- 164th Virginia General Assembly

Type
- Type: Lower House of the Virginia General Assembly
- Term limits: None

History
- Established: 1776
- Preceded by: House of Burgesses
- New session started: January 14, 2026

Leadership
- Speaker: Don Scott (D) since January 10, 2024
- Majority Leader: Charniele Herring (D) since January 10, 2024
- Minority Leader: Terry Kilgore (R) since June 1, 2025

Structure
- Seats: 100
- Political groups: Majority: Democratic (64); Minority: Republican (36)
- Length of term: 2 years
- Authority: Article IV, Virginia Constitution
- Salary: $17,640/year + per diem

Elections
- Last election: November 4, 2025
- Next election: November 2, 2027
- Redistricting: By 16-member bipartisan commission, approved by General Assembly

Meeting place
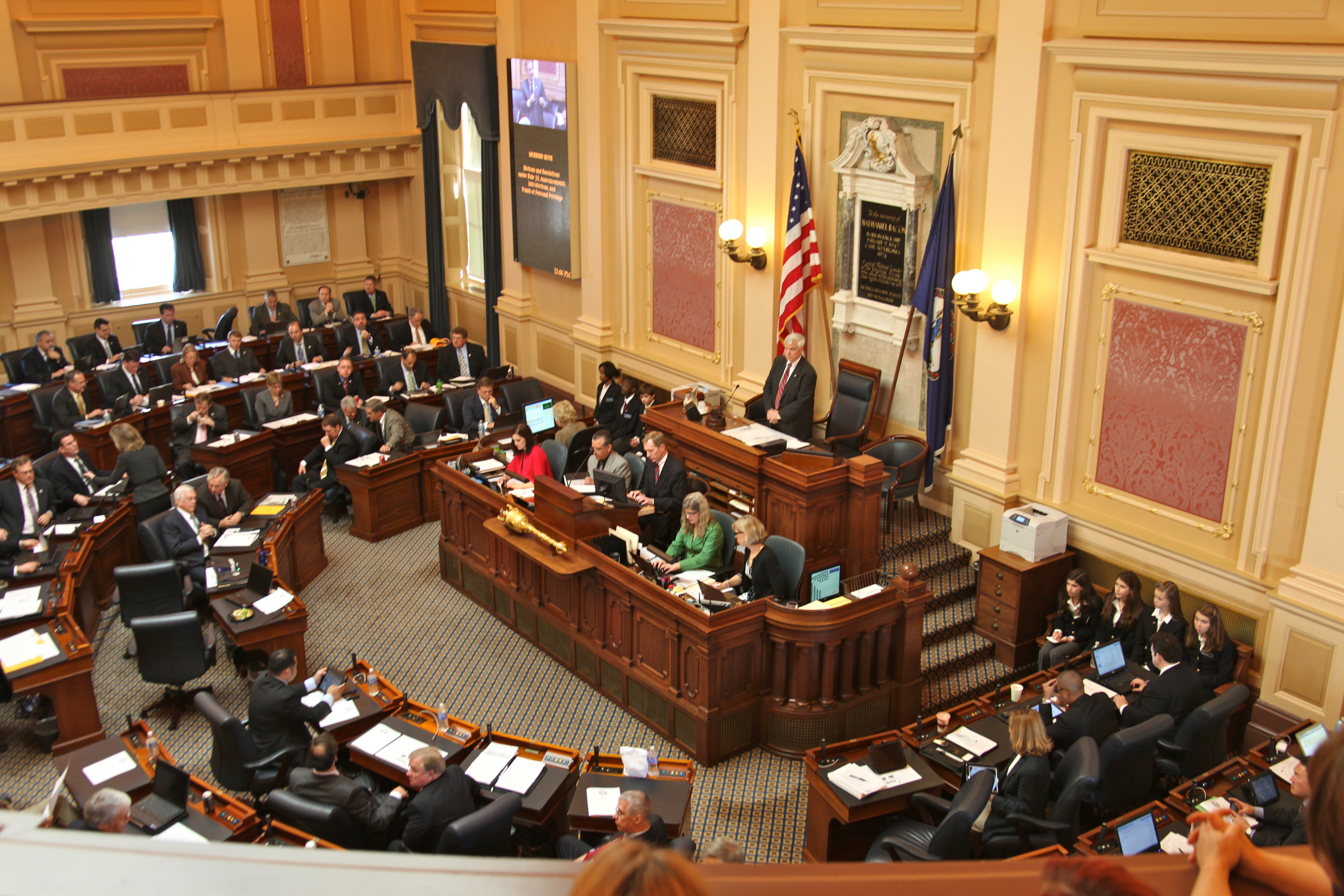
- House of Delegates Chamber; Virginia State Capitol; Richmond, Virginia

Website
- Virginia General Assembly

The Virginia House of Delegates is one of the two houses of the Virginia General Assembly, the other being the Senate of Virginia. It has 100 members elected for terms of two years; unlike most states, these elections take place during odd-numbered years. The House is presided over by the Speaker of the House, who is elected from among the House members by the Delegates. The Speaker is usually a member of the majority party and, as Speaker, becomes the most powerful member of the House. The House shares legislative power with the Senate, the upper house of the General Assembly. The House of Delegates is the modern-day successor to the colonial House of Burgesses, which first met at Jamestown in 1619. It is the oldest continuous English-speaking representative legislative assembly in the Americas. The House is divided into Democratic and Republican caucuses. In addition to the Speaker, there is a majority leader, a majority whip, a majority caucus chair, a minority leader, a minority whip, a minority caucus chair, and the chairs of the several committees of the House.

Only Virginia, West Virginia and Maryland refer to their lower house as the House of Delegates.

== History and location ==
The House of Burgesses was the first elected legislative body in the New World. Originally having 22 members, the House of Burgesses met from 1619 through 1632 in the choir of the church at Jamestown. From 1632 to 1699 the legislative body met at four different state houses in Jamestown. The first state house convened at the home of Colonial Governor Sir John Harvey from 1632 to 1656. The burgesses convened at the second state house from 1656 until it was destroyed in 1660. Historians have yet to precisely identify its location.

The House of Burgesses had its final meeting in May 1776, and the House of Delegates took its place in October of that year.

The House has met in the Virginia State Capitol, designed by Thomas Jefferson, since 1788. The legislative body met from 1788 to 1904 in what is known as today the Old Hall of the House of Delegates or commonly referred to as the Old House Chamber. The Old House Chamber is part of the original Capitol building structure. It measures 76 feet in width and is filled today with furnishings that resemble what the room would have looked like during its time of use. There are many bronze and marble busts of historic Virginians on display in the Old House Chamber, including: George Mason, George Wythe, Patrick Henry, Richard Henry Lee, and Meriwether Lewis. From 1904 to 1906, University of Virginia graduate and architect John K. Peeples designed and built compatible classical wings to the west and east side of the Capitol building. The new wings added to provide more space and serve as the legislative chambers in the Virginia General Assembly, the Senate of Virginia resides in the west chamber and the House of Delegates resides in the east chamber. The General Assembly members and staff operate from offices in the General Assembly Building, located in Capitol Square. Prior to 1788, the House of Delegates met in the Colonial Capital of Williamsburg.

In 1999, Republicans took control of the House of Delegates for the first time since Reconstruction (with the exception of a brief two-year period in which the Readjuster Party was in the majority in the 1880s). The Republican Party held the majority until 2019, when the Democratic Party won a majority of the seats, thus regaining control of the House of Delegates. The majority was sworn in on January 8, 2020, after which Eileen Filler-Corn (D-Fairfax) was elected as the first female and Jewish Speaker of the Virginia House of Delegates.

On November 4, 2020, Virginia voters approved a constitutional amendment that removed the authority to redistrict congressional and state legislative districts from the General Assembly, and gave that power to a newly established 16-member panel composed of eight lawmakers and eight non-lawmaker citizens. The maps created by this commission are subject to the approval of the General Assembly, but lawmakers cannot change the commission's lines.

On November 7, 2023, the Democrats regained control of the House of Delegates after securing a 51-seat majority.

== Salary and qualifications ==
The annual salary for delegates is $17,640, and will rise to $50,000 per year starting upon the taking office of senators after the 2027 Virginia House of Delegates election.. Each delegate represents roughly 84,702 people. Candidates for office must be at least 21 years of age at the time of the election, residents of the districts they seek to represent, and qualified to vote for General Assembly legislators. The regular session of the General Assembly is 60 days long during even numbered years and 30 days long during odd numbered years, unless extended by a two-thirds vote of both houses.

== Composition ==
Article IV, Section 3 of the Constitution of Virginia stipulates that the House of Delegates shall consist of between 90 and 100 members. It does not put any condition on the number of districts and only speaks of "several house districts". While there used to be multi-member districts, since 1982 there have been 100 districts electing one member each.

=== Current political composition ===
↓
64	36
Democratic	Republican

Affiliation	Party (Shading indicates majority caucus)		Total	Vacant
Affiliation	Democratic	Republican	Total	Vacant
Previous legislature (2016–2018)	34	66	100	0
Previous legislature (2018–2020)	49	51	100	0
Previous legislature (2020–2022)	55	45	100	0
Previous legislature (2022–2024)	48	52	100	0
Previous legislature (2024–2026)	51	49	100	0
Begin 2026	63	36	100	0
January 17, 2026 (Note: Mark Sickles (District 17) and Candi King (District 23) resigned to take positions in Governor Abigail Spanberger's administration. Democrat Charlie Schmidt (District 77) sworn in to succeed Mike Jones, who had resigned to run for Senate District 15.)	62	36	98	2
January 19, 2026 (Note: Democrat Margaret Franklin sworn in to succeed King.)	63	36	99	1
January 21, 2026 (Note: Democrat Garrett McGuire sworn in to succeed Sickles.)	64	36	100	0
February 20, 2026 (Note: Republican Barry Knight (District 98) died.)	64	35	99	1
March 17, 2026 (Note: Republican Andrew Rice sworn in to succeed Knight.)	64	36	100	0
May 31, 2026 (Note: Democrat Michelle Maldonado resigned.)	63	36	99	1
Latest voting share	63.6%	35.4%		

=== Historical party control ===
(The party control table shows the balance of power after each recent general election. The preceding Makeup table includes results of special elections since the last general election.)

Years	Democratic	Republican	Independent
1900–1904	93	7	0
1904–1912	86	14	0
1912–1914	90	10	0
1914–1916	92	8	0
1916–1922	88	12	0
1922–1924	95	5	0
1924–1926	97	3	0
1926–1928	95	5	0
1928–1930	93	7	0
1930–1934	95	5	0
1934–1940	93	7	0
1940–1944	97	3	0
1944–1946	94	6	0
1946–1950	93	7	0
1950–1960	94	6	0
1960–1962	96	4	0
1962–1964	94	5	1
1964–1966	89	11	0
1966–1968	87	12	1
1968–1970	86	14	0
1970–1972	75	24	1
1972–1974	73	24	3
1974–1976	65	20	15
1976–1978	78	17	5
1978–1980	76	21	3
1980–1982	74	25	1
1982–1984	66	32	2
1984–1986	65	34	1
1986–1988	65	33	2
1988–1990	64	35	1
1990–1992	59	40	1
1992–1994	58	41	1
1994–1996	52	47	1
1996–1998	52	47	1
1998–2000	50	49	1
2000–2002	47	52	1
2002–2004	34	64	2
2004–2006	37	61	2
2006–2008	40	57	3
2008–2010	44	54	2
2010–2012	39	59	2
2012–2014	32	66	2
2014–2016	32	67	1
2016–2018	34	66	0
2018–2020	49	51	0
2020–2022	55	45	0
2022–2024	48	52	0
2024–2026	51	49	0
2026–2028	64	36	0

== House leadership ==
Speaker	Don Scott
Majority Leader	Charniele Herring
Majority Whip	Rozia Henson
Majority Caucus Chair	Kathy Tran
Minority Leader	Terry Kilgore
Minority Caucus Chair	
Minority Whip	Michael Webert

=== Committee chairs and ranking members ===
The House has 14 standing committees.

Committee	Chair	Vice Chair	Senior Minority Member
Agriculture, Chesapeake and Natural Resources	Alfonso Lopez	Nadarius Clark	Lee Ware
Appropriations	Luke Torian	Betsy Carr	Terry Austin
Communications, Technology and Innovation	Cliff Hayes	Irene Shin	Joe McNamara
Counties, Cities and Towns	Dan Helmer	Briana Sewell	vacant
Courts of Justice	Patrick Hope	Michelle Maldonado	Terry Kilgore
Education	Sam Rasoul	Shelly Simonds	
Finance	Vivian Watts	Phil Hernandez	
General Laws	Paul Krizek	Holly Seibold	vacant
Health and Human Services	Rodney Willett	Kathy Tran	
Labor and Commerce	Jeion Ward	Rip Sullivan	Terry Kilgore
Privileges and Elections	Cia Price	Kelly Convirs-Fowler	Israel O'Quinn
Public Safety	Marcus Simon	Adele McClure	Tony Wilt
Rules	Don Scott	Charniele Herring	Terry Kilgore
Transportation	Karrie Delaney	David Reid	vacant

== Members ==
Districts map from the 2023 election

The Virginia House of Delegates is reelected every two years, with intervening vacancies filled by special election. The list below contains the House delegates that are currently serving in the 164th Virginia General Assembly, which convened on January 14, 2026.

District	Name	Party	Areas represented		First election
District	Name	Party	Counties	Cities	First election
1	Patrick Hope	Dem	Arlington (part)		2009
2	Adele McClure	Dem	Arlington (part)		2023
3	Alfonso Lopez	Dem	Arlington (part)	Alexandria (part)	2011
4	Charniele Herring	Dem	Fairfax (part)	Alexandria (part)	2009 (special)
5	Kirk McPike	Dem		Alexandria (part)	2026 (special)
6	Rip Sullivan	Dem	Fairfax (part)		2013
7	Karen Keys-Gamarra	Dem	Fairfax (part)		2023
8	Irene Shin	Dem	Fairfax (part)		2021
9	Karrie Delaney	Dem	Fairfax (part)		2017
10	Dan Helmer	Dem	Fairfax (part)		2019
11	Gretchen Bulova	Dem	Fairfax (part)	Fairfax (part)	2026 (special)
12	Holly Seibold	Dem	Fairfax (part)		2023 (special)
13	Marcus Simon	Dem	Fairfax (part)	Falls Church	2013
14	Vivian Watts	Dem	Fairfax (part)		1981
15	Laura Cohen	Dem	Fairfax (part)		2023
16	Paul Krizek	Dem	Fairfax (part)		2015
17	Garrett McGuire	Dem	Fairfax (part)		2026 (special)
18	Kathy Tran	Dem	Fairfax (part)		2017
19	Rozia Henson	Dem	Fairfax (part), Prince William (part)		2023
20	Sonia Vásquez Luna	Dem	Prince William (part)	Manassas, Manassas Park	2026 (special)
21	Josh Thomas	Dem	Prince William (part)		2023
22	Elizabeth Guzmán	Dem	Prince William (part)		2017
23	Margaret Franklin	Dem	Prince William (part), Stafford (part)		2026 (special)
24	Luke Torian	Dem	Prince William (part)		2009
25	Briana Sewell	Dem	Prince William (part)		2021
26	JJ Singh	Dem	Loudoun (part)		2025 (special)
27	Atoosa Reaser	Dem	Loudoun (part)		2023
28	David Reid	Dem	Loudoun (part)		2017
29	Marty Martinez	Dem	Loudoun (part)		2023
30	John McAuliff	Dem	Loudoun (part), Fauquier (part)		2025
31	Delores Oates	Rep	Clarke, Frederick (part), Warren (part)		2023
32	Bill Wiley	Rep	Frederick (part)	Winchester	2020 (special)
33	Justin Pence	Rep	Page, Rockingham (part), Shenandoah, Warren (part)		2025
34	Tony Wilt	Rep	Rockingham (part)	Harrisonburg	2009
35	Chris Runion	Rep	Augusta (part), Bath, Highland, Rockingham (part)		2019
36	Ellen McLaughlin	Rep	Augusta (part), Rockbridge (part)	Staunton, Waynesboro	2023 (special)
37	Terry Austin	Rep	Alleghany, Botetourt, Craig, Rockbridge (part)	Buena Vista, Covington, Lexington	2013
38	Sam Rasoul	Dem		Roanoke (part)	2013
39	Will Davis	Rep	Franklin, Roanoke (part)		2023
40	Joseph McNamara	Rep	Roanoke (part)	Roanoke (part), Salem	2017
41	Lily Franklin	Dem	Montgomery (part), Roanoke (part)		2025
42	Jason Ballard	Rep	Giles, Montgomery (part), Pulaski (part)	Radford	2021
43	Will Morefield	Rep	Bland, Buchanan, Dickenson (part), Russell (part), Tazewell		2009
44	Israel O'Quinn	Rep	Russell (part), Washington	Bristol	2011
45	Terry Kilgore	Rep	Dickenson (part), Lee, Scott, Wise	Norton	1993
46	Mitchell Cornett	Rep	Grayson, Pulaski (part), Smyth, Wythe		2025
47	Wren Williams	Rep	Carroll, Floyd, Henry (part), Patrick	Galax	2021
48	Eric Phillips	Rep	Henry (part), Pittsylvania (part)	Martinsville	2024 (special)
49	Madison Whittle	Rep	Halifax (part), Pittsylvania (part)	Danville	2025
50	Tommy Wright	Rep	Charlotte, Halifax (part), Lunenburg, Mecklenburg, Prince Edward (part)		2000 (special)
51	Eric Zehr	Rep	Bedford (part), Campbell (part), Pittsylvania (part)		2023
52	Wendell Walker	Rep	Campbell (part)	Lynchburg	2019
53	Tim Griffin	Rep	Amherst, Bedford (part), Nelson (part)		2023
54	Katrina Callsen	Dem	Albemarle (part)	Charlottesville	2023
55	Amy Laufer	Dem	Albemarle (part), Louisa (part), Nelson (part)		2023
56	Tom Garrett	Rep	Appomattox, Buckingham, Cumberland, Fluvanna, Goochland (part), Prince Edward (part)		2023
57	May Nivar	Dem	Goochland (part), Henrico (part)		2025
58	Rodney Willett	Dem	Henrico (part)		2019
59	Buddy Fowler	Rep	Hanover (part), Henrico (part), Louisa (part)		2013
60	Scott Wyatt	Rep	Hanover (part), New Kent (part)		2019
61	Michael Webert	Rep	Culpeper (part), Fauquier (part), Rappahannock		2011
62	Karen Hamilton	Rep	Culpeper (part), Greene, Madison, Orange		2025
63	Phillip Scott	Rep	Orange (part), Spotsylvania (part)		2021
64	Stacey Carroll	Dem	Stafford (part)		2025
65	Joshua Cole	Dem	Spotsylvania (part), Stafford (part)	Fredericksburg	2019
66	Nicole Cole	Dem	Caroline (part), Spotsylvania (part)		2025
67	Hillary Kent	Rep	Caroline (part), King George, Lancaster, Northumberland, Richmond, Westmoreland		2023
68	Keith Hodges	Rep	Essex, Gloucester (part), King and Queen, King William, Mathews, Middlesex		2011
69	Mark Downey	Dem	Gloucester (part), James City (part), York (part)	Newport News (part)	2025
70	Shelly Simonds	Dem		Newport News (part)	2019
71	Jessica Anderson	Dem	James City (part), New Kent (part)	Williamsburg	2025
72	Lee Ware	Rep	Amelia, Chesterfield (part), Nottoway, Powhatan		1997
73	Leslie Mehta	Dem	Chesterfield (part)		2025
74	Mike Cherry	Rep	Chesterfield (part)	Colonial Heights	2021
75	Lindsey Dougherty	Dem	Chesterfield (part), Prince George (part)	Hopewell	2025
76	Debra Gardner	Dem	Chesterfield (part)		2023
77	Charlie Schmidt	Dem	Chesterfield (part)	Richmond (part)	2026 (special)
78	Betsy Carr	Dem		Richmond (part)	2009
79	Rae Cousins	Dem		Richmond (part)	2023
80	Destiny LeVere Bolling	Dem	Henrico (part)		2023
81	Delores McQuinn	Dem	Charles City, Chesterfield (part), Henrico (part)		2009 (special)
82	Kimberly Pope Adams	Dem	Dinwiddie (part), Prince George (part), Surry	Petersburg	2025
83	Otto Wachsmann	Rep	Brunswick, Dinwiddie (part), Greensville, Isle of Wight (part), Southampton, Sussex	Emporia	2021
84	Nadarius Clark	Dem	Isle of Wight (part)	Franklin, Suffolk (part)	2021
85	Cia Price	Dem		Newport News (part)	2015
86	Virgil Thornton	Dem	York (part)	Hampton (part), Poquoson	2025
87	Jeion Ward	Dem		Hampton (part)	2003
88	Don Scott	Dem		Portsmouth (part)	2019
89	Kacey Carnegie	Dem		Chesapeake (part), Suffolk (part)	2025
90	Jay Leftwich	Rep		Chesapeake (part)	2013
91	Cliff Hayes	Dem		Chesapeake (part), Portsmouth (part)	2016 (special)
92	Bonita Anthony	Dem		Chesapeake (part), Norfolk (part)	2023
93	Jackie Glass	Dem		Norfolk (part)	2022 (special)
94	Phil Hernandez	Dem		Norfolk (part)	2023
95	Alex Askew	Dem		Norfolk (part), Virginia Beach (part)	2019
96	Kelly Convirs-Fowler	Dem		Virginia Beach (part)	2017
97	Michael Feggans	Dem		Virginia Beach (part)	2023
98	Andrew Rice	Rep		Virginia Beach (part)	2026 (special)
99	Anne Tata	Rep		Virginia Beach (part)	2021
100	Robert Bloxom	Rep	Accomack, Northampton	Virginia Beach (part)	2013

== Database of past and present members ==
Marking the 400th anniversary of the House of Burgesses, the House Clerk's Office announced a new Database of House Members called "DOME" that chronicles the "9,700-plus men and women who served as burgesses or delegates in the Virginia General Assembly over the past four centuries."

== See also ==
- List of Virginia state legislatures
- Mace of the Virginia House of Delegates
- Political party strength in Virginia
- Redistricting in Virginia
- Virginia House of Delegates elections, 2017
- Category:Members of the Virginia House of Delegates
