= Elliot Schewel =

American businessman and politician (1924–2019)

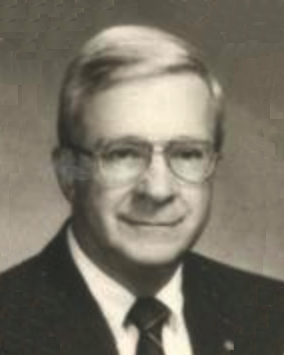
- Official portrait, 1988

Member of the Virginia Senate from the 23rd district
- In office January 14, 1976 – January 10, 1996
- Preceded by: Robert S. Burruss Jr.
- Succeeded by: Stephen Newman

Personal details
- Born: Elliot Sidney Schewel; June 20, 1924 Lynchburg, Virginia, U.S.
- Died: December 15, 2019 (aged 95) Lynchburg, Virginia, U.S.
- Party: Democratic
- Spouse: Rosel Hoffberger (m. 1949; died 2017)
- Children: 3, including Michael
- Education: Washington and Lee University (BS)

Military service
- Branch/service: United States Army; Army Air Forces
- Years of service: 1943–1945
- Battles/wars: World War II

Elliot Sidney Schewel (June 20, 1924 – December 15, 2019) was an American businessman and politician who served for two decades as a member of the Virginia Senate, representing his native Lynchburg. He also worked at Schewel Furniture, a Lynchburg-based furniture retail company founded by his grandfather, for over fifty years.
