= Bonita Anthony =

American politician from Virginia

Member of the Virginia House of Delegates from the 92nd district
- Incumbent
- Assumed office January 10, 2024
- Preceded by: Jeion Ward (redistricting)

Personal details
- Born: 1967 or 1968 (age 57–58) Norfolk, Virginia, U.S.
- Party: Democratic
- Education: Old Dominion University (BS, ME); Virginia Union University (MDiv)

Bonita Grace Anthony, born 1967 or 1968, is an American engineer, university administrator, and politician serving as a member of the Virginia House of Delegates from the 92nd district since 2024. The district is composed of parts of the cities of Chesapeake and Norfolk.

A Democrat, she was first elected in 2023.

== Early life and education ==
Anthony was born and raised in Norfolk, Virginia, and graduated from Booker T. Washington High School in 1986. She earned a Bachelor of Science in electrical engineering in 1992 and a Master of Engineering in modeling and simulation engineering in 2016 from Old Dominion University. Additionally, she earned a Master of Divinity from Virginia Union University in 2002.

== Career ==
Anthony previously worked as an aviation engineer and educator from the pre-K to university levels. She also worked as a university administrator for the College of Engineering and Technology at Virginia State University and is active in her community as a minister.

In 2018, she ran for the Norfolk Public Schools Board Ward 4 position, placing third with 25.6% of the vote.

=== Virginia House of Delegates ===
Anthony ran for the Virginia House of Delegates in the 92nd district, an open seat including the cities of Chesapeake and Norfolk, in 2023. She cited the leaked Dobbs v. Jackson Women's Health Organization ruling as inspiring her to run and protect abortion access. She defeated Kim Sudderth in the Democratic primary with 51.79% of the vote and won the general election against Republican candidate Michael Durig with 77.81% of the vote.

== Electoral history ==
=== 2018 ===
Norfolk Public Schools Board Ward 4, 2018 election
Party	Candidate	Votes	%
Nonpartisan	Christine Smith	674	37.0
Nonpartisan	Leon Rouson	493	27.0
Nonpartisan	Bonita Anthony	466	25.6
Nonpartisan	Alfreda Thomas	177	9.7
Write-in		13	0.7
Total votes		1,823	100.0

=== 2023 ===
Virginia's 92nd House of Delegates district, 2023 Democratic primary
Party	Candidate	Votes	%
Democratic	Bonita Anthony	3,014	51.79%
Democratic	Kim Sudderth	2,806	48.21%
Total votes		5,820	100.00%

Virginia's 92nd House of Delegates District, 2023 general election
Party	Candidate	Votes	%
Democratic	Bonita Anthony	11,807	77.81
Republican	Michael Durig	3,313	21.83
Write-in		54	0.36
Total votes		15,174	100
Democratic win (new seat)			
