= Patenaude =

Patenaude is a surname. Notable people with the surname include:

- Bert Patenaude (1909–1974), American soccer player
- Dave Patenaude (born 1968), American football coach
- Ed Patenaude (1949–2021), Canadian professional ice hockey player
- Esioff-Léon Patenaude (1875–1963), Canadian politician
- Martine Patenaude (born 1974), Canadian ice dancer
- Pam Patenaude (born 1961), American government official
