= United States Deputy Secretary of Housing and Urban Development =

Deputy Secretary of Housing and Urban Development of the United States
- Seal of the Department of Housing and Urban Development

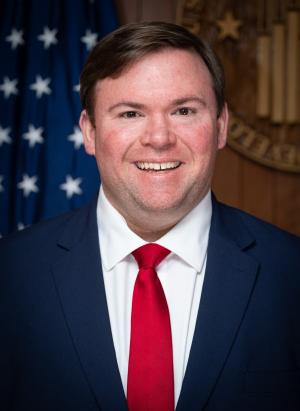
- Incumbent; Andrew D. Hughes since June 27, 2025
- Department of Housing and Urban Development
- Style: Mister/Madam Deputy Secretary (informal); The Honorable (formal)
- Reports to: Secretary of Housing and Urban Development
- Seat: Washington, D.C., U.S.
- Appointer: The president; with Senate advice and consent
- Term length: No fixed term
- Constituting instrument: 42 U.S.C. § 3533
- Formation: 1990
- First holder: Alfred A. DelliBovi
- Salary: Level II of the Executive Schedule
- Website: www.hud.gov

The deputy secretary of housing and urban development, in the United States government, is the chief operating officer of the United States Department of Housing and Urban Development. The current deputy secretary is Andrew D. Hughes, who was sworn in on June 27, 2025.

The deputy secretary is nominated by the president and confirmed by the Senate.

Alfred A. DelliBovi was the first deputy secretary after the title had been changed from under secretary in 1990. The under secretary position was created with the establishment of the Department in 1966.

== List of deputy secretaries of housing and urban development ==
#	Image	Name	Term began	Term ended	President(s) served under
1		Alfred A. DelliBovi	1989	1992	George H. W. Bush
2		Frank Keating	1992	1993	George H. W. Bush
3		Terrence R. Duvernay	1993	1994	Bill Clinton
–		Andrew Cuomo (acting)	1994	January 29, 1997	Bill Clinton
4		Saul N. Ramirez Jr.	October 1998	January 20, 2001	Bill Clinton
5		Alphonso Jackson	May 24, 2001	August 31, 2004	George W. Bush
6		Roy Bernardi	November 21, 2004	January 20, 2009	George W. Bush
7		Ron Sims	May 8, 2009	July 31, 2011	Barack Obama
8		Maurice Jones	April 18, 2012	January 2014	Barack Obama
–		Helen Kanovsky (acting)	January 2014	December 8, 2014	Barack Obama
9		Nani A. Coloretti	December 8, 2014	January 20, 2017	Barack Obama
10		Pam Patenaude	September 27, 2017	January 17, 2019	Donald Trump
11		Brian D. Montgomery	January 17, 2019	May 12, 2020	Donald Trump
11		Brian D. Montgomery	May 12, 2020	January 20, 2021	Donald Trump
12		Adrianne Todman	June 14, 2021	January 20, 2025	Joe Biden
13		Andrew D. Hughes	June 27, 2025	Incumbent	Donald Trump
