= Nani A. Coloretti =

American policy advisor

Nani Coloretti
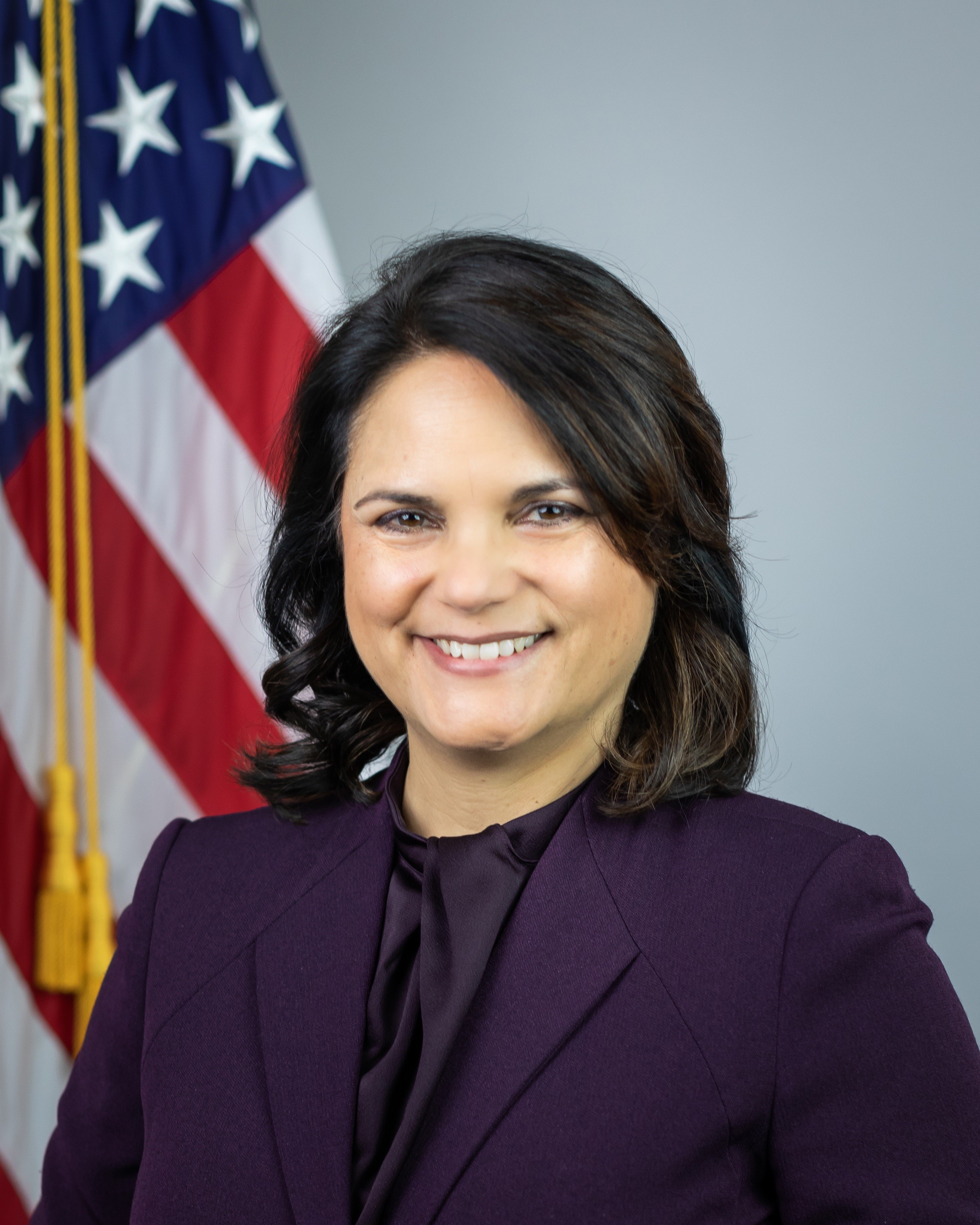

Deputy Director of the Office of Management and Budget
- In office April 5, 2022 – January 20, 2025
- President: Joe Biden
- Preceded by: Shalanda Young
- Succeeded by: Dan Bishop

9th United States Deputy Secretary of Housing and Urban Development
- In office December 8, 2014 – January 20, 2017
- President: Barack Obama
- Preceded by: Maurice Jones
- Succeeded by: Pam Patenaude

United States Assistant Secretary of the Treasury for Management
- In office April 2, 2012 – December 8, 2014; Acting: April 2, 2012 – November 16, 2012
- President: Barack Obama
- Preceded by: Dan Tangherlini
- Succeeded by: Brodi Fontenot

Personal details
- Born: 1968 or 1969 (age 57–58) San Francisco, CA, U.S.
- Party: Democratic
- Education: University of Pennsylvania (BA); University of California, Berkeley (MPP)

Nani Ann Coloretti (born 1968/1969) is an American policy advisor who served as the deputy director of the Office of Management and Budget. Coloretti served as United States Deputy Secretary of Housing and Urban Development from 2014 to 2017. Following her service as deputy secretary, she became senior vice president for financial and business strategy and treasurer at the Urban Institute.

== Early life and education ==
Coloretti was born in San Francisco and raised in Kipahulu, Hawaii, graduating from the ʻIolani School in 1987. She then earned a Bachelor of Arts in economics and communications from the University of Pennsylvania in 1991 and a Master of Public Policy from the University of California, Berkeley in 1994.

== Career ==
=== Early career ===
Coloretti's early experience includes work as a budget analyst in the Hawaii Department of Public Safety from 1991 to 1992, and later in budget, health, and welfare analysis as a Presidential Management Fellow and budget and program examiner in the Health Financing Branch at the Office of Management and Budget during the Clinton administration from 1994 to 1997, as well an economic and financial consultant in the Public Policy Practice of the LECG Corporation from 1997 to 1999.

=== San Francisco ===
From 1999 to 2005, Coloretti was the director of policy, planning, and budget for the San Francisco Department of Children, Youth, and Their Families before moving to the Mayor's Office under Gavin Newsom in 2005 as deputy policy director and then policy director until 2006. She then moved to being budget director, managing the development and implementation of San Francisco's $6 billion annual budget and advised Newsom on multiple policy areas.

=== Department of the Treasury ===
She joined the Treasury Department in 2009 as principal deputy assistant secretary for management and budget, during which time she was detailed to the Consumer Financial Protection Bureau to help establish it as acting COO from 2011 to 2012. She was then acting assistant secretary for management from April 2012 until she was confirmed to that role in November 2012, serving concurrently as acting chief financial officer until that nomination was withdrawn in favor of her eventual HUD nomination. In that role she oversaw all operational areas including the development and execution of the department's budget, performance and strategic planning processes, procurement, human resources, information technology, and the management of Treasury's headquarters and bureaus.

=== Department of Housing and Urban Development ===
On March 6, 2014, President Barack Obama nominated Coloretti to be the next United States deputy secretary of housing and urban development. On December 2, 2014, she was confirmed by the United States Senate by a vote of 68–28. As deputy secretary, she was the highest-ranking Filipino American in the Obama administration.

=== Urban Institute ===
In 2017, Coloretti was appointed as senior vice president for financial and business strategy and treasurer at the Urban Institute. She has also been a fellow of the National Academy of Public Administration and a strategic advisor to government executives at the Partnership for Public Service.

=== Office of Management and Budget ===
After elevating Shalanda Young from the deputy position to the OMB's permanent director, President Joe Biden announced the nomination of Coloretti to serve as deputy director of the Office of Management and Budget. She was previously floated as a candidate for the director position following the failed nomination of Neera Tanden. On March 29, 2022, the United States Senate invoked cloture on her nomination by a 56–43 vote. Coloretti was confirmed later that day by a 57–41 vote.

== Awards and recognition ==
Coloretti is a recipient of the National Public Service Award, the Public Policy and International Affairs Achievement Award, the Government Finance Officers Association Distinguished Budget Presentation Award, and the Fed 100 Award.

== Personal life ==
Coloretti lives in Bethesda, Maryland with her husband and son.

Political offices
Preceded by Maurice Jones	United States Deputy Secretary of Housing and Urban Development; 2014–2017	Succeeded by Pam Patenaude
Preceded by Shalanda Young	Deputy Director of the Office of Management and Budget; 2022–2025	Succeeded by Dan Bishop
