= Jim Cheng =

American businessman

15th Virginia Secretary of Commerce
- In office January 17, 2010 – January 11, 2014
- Governor: Bob McDonnell
- Preceded by: Patrick Gottschalk
- Succeeded by: Maurice Jones

Personal details
- Born: Cheng Su-ting; July 20, 1960 (age 66) Taipei, Taiwan
- Party: Republican
- Spouse: Jeanette Wang
- Education: Old Dominion University (BS); University of Virginia (MBA); Georgetown University (JD)
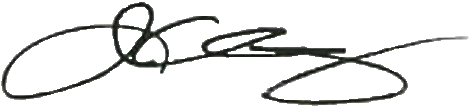
- Signature

James Su-ting Cheng (born July 20, 1960) is an American businessman who served as Secretary of Commerce and Trade under Virginia Governor Bob McDonnell. Cheng was born in Taipei, Taiwan and emigrated to the United States with his parents at the age of three. He attended Old Dominion University, the University of Virginia Darden School of Business, and Georgetown University Law Center.

Political offices
Preceded by Patrick Gottschalk	Virginia Secretary of Commerce; 2010–2014	Succeeded by Maurice Jones
