= Maurice Jones =

United States government official

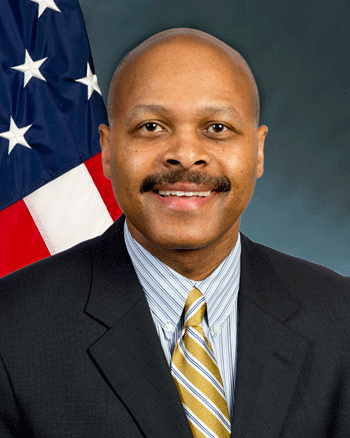

President and CEO of the Local Initiatives Support Corporation
- In office 2016–2020
- Preceded by: Michael Rubinger

16th Virginia Secretary of Commerce
- In office January 27, 2014 – September 6, 2016
- Governor: Terry McAuliffe
- Preceded by: Jim Cheng
- Succeeded by: Todd Haymore

8th United States Deputy Secretary of Housing and Urban Development
- In office April 18, 2012 – January 2014
- President: Barack Obama
- Preceded by: Ron Sims
- Succeeded by: Nani A. Coloretti

Personal details
- Born: Maurice Antonia Jones; September 14, 1964 (age 62) Mecklenburg, Virginia, U.S.
- Party: Democratic
- Spouse: Lisa Smith
- Education: Hampden-Sydney College (BA); St John's College, Oxford (MPhil); University of Virginia (JD)
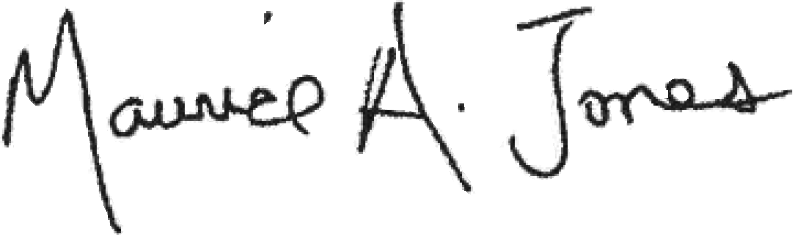
- Signature

Maurice Antonia Jones (born September 14, 1964) is the former CEO of OneTen, a coalition of companies dedicated to creating one million jobs for African Americans by the end of the 2020s. Prior to OneTen, he was president and CEO of the Local Initiatives Support Corporation, a national community development financial institution. Previously, he served as the deputy secretary of HUD in the Obama administration, and then as Virginia Secretary of Commerce in the cabinet of Governor Terry McAuliffe.

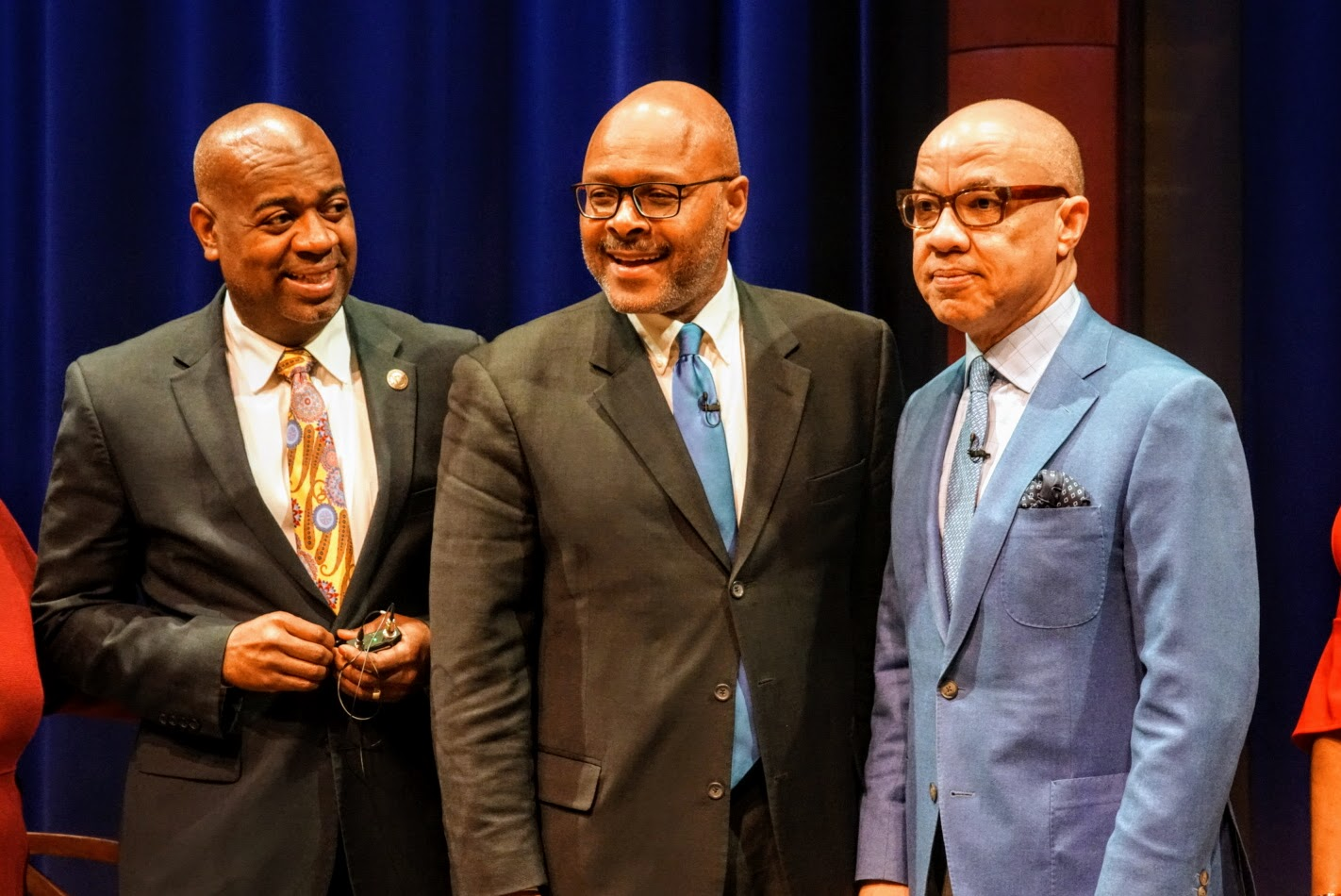
Maurice A. Jones (c) with Ras Baraka, Mayor of Newark, New Jersey and Darren Walker, President of the Ford Foundation.

Jones was born in rural Mecklenburg County and grew up on his grandparents' tobacco farm near the town of Kenbridge. He earned a bachelor's degree in political science from Hampden–Sydney College, where he graduated Omicron Delta Kappa, before attending St. John's College, Oxford on a Rhodes scholarship and the University of Virginia School of Law.

In November 2020, Jones was named a candidate for United States Secretary of Housing and Urban Development in the Biden administration, but was not chosen.

Political offices
Preceded by Ron Sims	United States Deputy Secretary of Housing and Urban Development; 2012–2014	Succeeded by Nani A. Coloretti
