= Leslie Crocker Snyder =

American lawyer

- Born: 1942 (age 83–84)
- Education: B.A. Radcliffe College; J.D. Case Western Reserve University School of Law
- Occupations: Attorney; Judge
- Spouse: Fred Snyder
- Children: Nicholas Snyder; Douglas Snyder
- Parent(s): Billie Dunn Crocker; Lester Crocker
- Family: Roger Crocker (Brother)

Leslie Crocker Snyder (born 1942) is an American lawyer, author, and former judge, most notable for her work writing and instituting the original rape shield laws in the state of New York. A pioneer in her field, she was the first woman to try a homicide in the state. She also ran for DA in 2005 and 2009 as a part of the Democratic Party.

== Early life and education ==
Crocker was born in New York to an academic family, the daughter of Billie (née Danziger) - and Lester Crocker - a professor and also a Dean at Case-Western Reserve University. She attended the Bryn Mawr School. Snyder graduated from Radcliffe College (now Harvard) on scholarship in 1962 and completed a certificate from the Harvard-Radcliffe Program in Business Administration in 1963. She then attended the Case Western Reserve University School of Law - where her father was dean of the graduate school. Snyder was admitted to the Ohio State Bar in 1966 and the New York State Bar in 1967.

== Legal career ==
Snyder has worked in the New York criminal justice system for over thirty-five years, both as a prosecutor and as a judge. She was the first female to try felony and homicide cases as an Assistant District Attorney in the Manhattan District Attorney's office under Frank Hogan and Robert Morgenthau. During her nine years in the office, Snyder founded and led the Sex Crimes Prosecution Bureau, which was the first in the nation and co-authored New York State's rape shield law.

After leaving the New York County District Attorney's Office, Snyder was named the Chief of Trials at the Office of the Special Prosecutor against Corruption. She re-entered the public sector after three years as a defense attorney for indigent clients and became Deputy Criminal Justice Coordinator and Head of the Arson Strike Force at the Office of the New York City Criminal Justice Coordinator. Soon after, she was appointed to the position of a Judge of the Criminal Court of the City of New York in 1983 by Mayor Ed Koch. She was reappointed to the Criminal Court Judgeship by Mayor David Dinkins in 1993

While serving as a Criminal Court Judge, Snyder was designated by the state courts administration to serve as an Acting Justice of the New York State Supreme Court, Criminal Term. This is a common procedure done in New York in order to provide more judges to handle felony criminal cases. It is easier to designate Acting Supreme Court Justices than to create more judgeships on the Supreme Court. Most Acting Justices come from either the New York City Criminal Court or Civil Court of the state Court of Claims bench. In June 2000, Judge Snyder was appointed by Gov. George Pataki, and confirmed by the New York Senate to a seven-year term on the New York Court of Claims. While she was a Court of Claims Judge, Snyder continued to serve as an Acting Supreme Court Justice and continued to handle criminal cases in New York County, New York.

While on the bench, Snyder presided over such trials as those of the "Gheri Curls", the "Wild Cowboys", the "Young Talented Children" and the "Natural Born Killers", among others, including those of murderers, rapists, as well as many white-collar, stock fraud and mob cases.

She resigned from the Court of Claims in 2004 in order to prepare for her run for District Attorney. Snyder became a partner at Kasowitz, Benson, Torres & Friedman LLP in 2003. She has since left the firm.

=== Running for Manhattan District Attorney ===
In 2005, Snyder challenged incumbent District Attorney Robert Morgenthau in the Democratic Party primary for election to the position of Manhattan District Attorney. Snyder garnered 42% of the vote, while Morgenthau took 58%. Morgenthau was eventually elected to his ninth term. The New York Times, a long supporter of Morgenthau, endorsed Snyder in its August 30, 2005 editorial, "When To End An Era", citing Snyder's "unquestioned ability and broad experience", "impressive energy", and "new ideas".

In 2008, Snyder renounced her support for the death penalty. She said she had done so after learning more about wrongful convictions in capital cases.

Snyder, along with Cyrus Vance, Jr. and Richard Aborn announced their candidacy for the district attorney race. The New York Times this time did not endorse Snyder but chose to endorse Cyrus Vance Jr., who won by a wide margin.

== Television ==
Snyder served as a legal consultant for the series Law & Order and Law & Order: Trial by Jury from 2004-2007 and has been a legal analyst for MSNBC and the Today show. In 2004–2005, she made several guest appearances on Law and Order portraying New York judge Rebecca Logan.

== Publications ==
Snyder has written and published 2 books the most recent in 2026. Her first book 25 to Life: The Truth, the Whole Truth, and Nothing But the Truth was co-written with Tom Shachtman and published on September 23, 2002. This book is a non-fiction account of her life and career in as a female lawyer and judge in New York City. Snyder's second publication is a fictional work called Restoring Justice: A Thriller. This novel was co-written with author Matthew Hall who is notable for his other crime related novels. This book was published on March 25, 2026, and revolves around a female judge in New York City who must solve a crime with national security implications. Snyder brings her own personal experiences with drug lords and death threats to this novel to make it come alive.

== Affiliations ==
Leslie Crocker Snyder is also a board member of the Kips Bay Boys and Girls Club, DARE, Abraham House, Federal Drug Agents Foundation, and the John Jay College of Criminal Justice.

== Personal life ==
In 1968, Crocker married pediatrician Fred Snyder; they have two sons: Nick and Doug. She is the author of 25 to Life, a memoir of her legal experiences, both as a prosecutor and as a judge.

She has appeared on numerous television programs including 60 Minutes, The Today Show, and The Charlie Rose Show. She has been featured on news, cable, and Court TV programs regarding crime, drugs and drug gangs, rape, women and the law, criminal law, and law enforcement.
