= Virginia Secretary of Commerce =

Secretary of Commerce and Trade of the Commonwealth of Virginia
- Seal of the Commonwealth of Virginia

- Flag of Virginia
- Incumbent; Carrie H. Chenery since January 17, 2026
- Member of: Virginia Governor's Cabinet
- Nominator: The governor
- Appointer: The governor with advice and consent from the Senate and House
- Term length: 4 years
- Inaugural holder: Maurice B. Rowe III (as Secretary of Commerce and Resources)
- Formation: April 8, 1972
- Website: commerce.virginia.gov

The secretary of commerce and trade is a member of the Virginia Governor's Cabinet. The office is currently held by Carrie H. Chenery, appointed on January 12, 2026, serving under Governor Abigail Spanberger.

== Duties ==
The Secretary is responsible for overseeing commerce, trade, and economic development in Virginia, and oversees the following state agencies:

- Virginia Economic Development Partnership
- Virginia Department of Energy
- Virginia Department of Housing and Community Development
- Virginia Office of Broadband
- Virginia Housing
- Virginia Innovation Partnership Corporation
- Virginia Tourism Corporation
- GO Virginia
- Virginia Department of Small Business and Supplier Diversity
- Virginia Small Business Financing Authority
- Tobacco Region Revitalization Commission
- Fort Monroe

== List of secretaries ==
=== Commerce and resources (July 1, 1972–1986) ===
- Maurice B. Rowe III (1972–1974)
- Earl J. Shiflet (1974–1978)
- Maurice B. Rowe III (1978–1982)
- Betty Jane Diener (1982–1986)

=== Economic development (1986–1993) ===
- Richard M. Bagley (1986–1988)
- Curry A. Roberts (1988–1990)
- Lawrence H. Framme III (1990–1992)
- Cate Magennis (1992–1993)

=== Commerce and trade (1993–present) ===
- Cate Magennis (1993–1994)
- Robert T. Skunda (1994–1997)
- Robert J. Stolle (1997–1998)
- Barry E. DuVal (1998–2001)
- Joshua N. Lief (2001–2002)
- Michael J. Schewel (2002–2006)
- Patrick Gottschalk (2006–2010)
- Jim Cheng (2010–2014)
- Maurice Jones (2014–2016)
- Todd Haymore (2016–2018)
- Esther Lee (2018)
- Brian Ball (2018–2022)
- Caren Merrick (2022–2025)
- Juan Pablo Segura (2025–2026)
- Carrie H. Chenery (2026-)

== Former offices absorbed by the secretary of commerce ==
- Virginia Secretary of Technology (2018)
