= Harvard-Radcliffe Program in Business Administration =

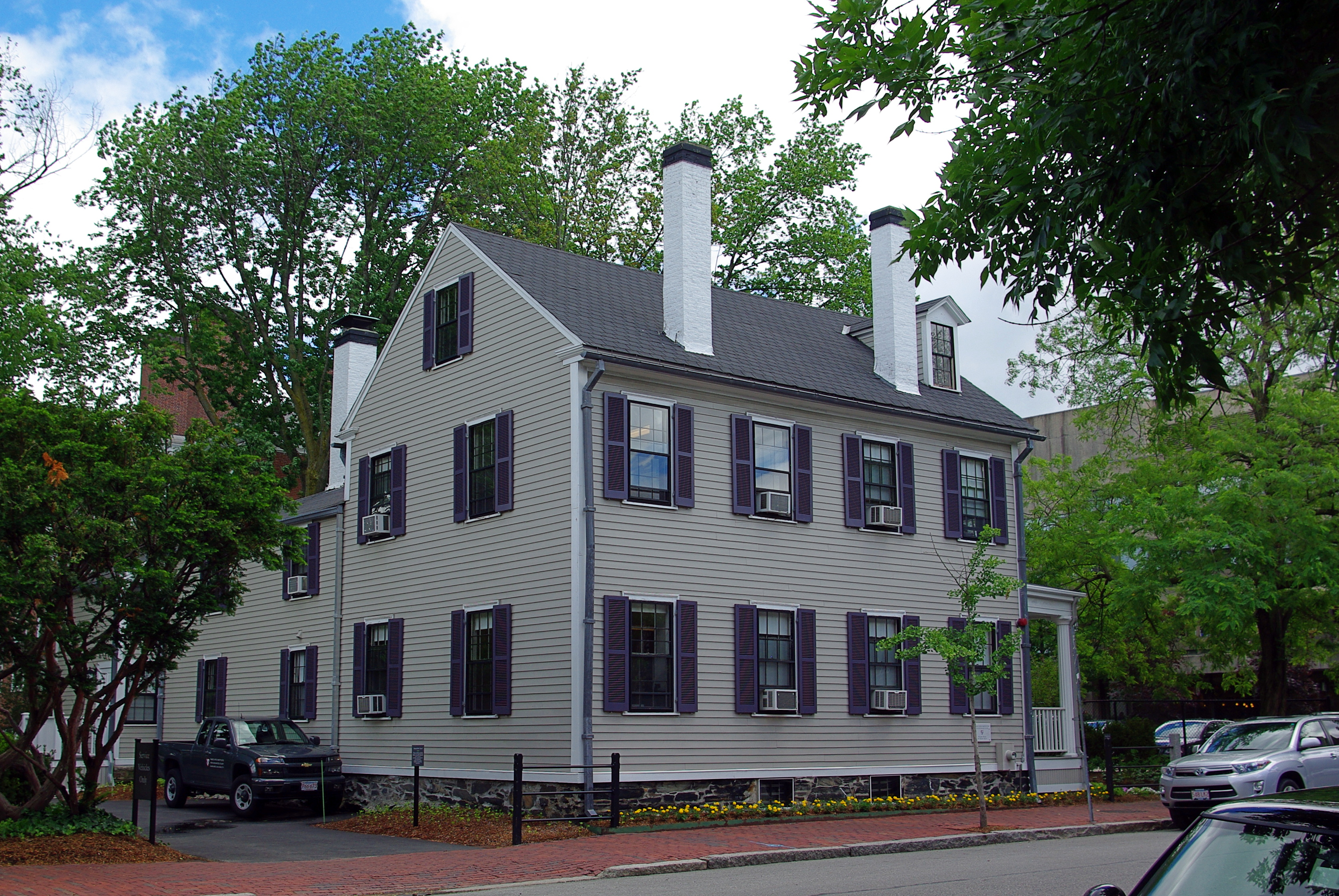
- Putnam House, 69 Brattle Street, was the headquarters of the program in the 1940s.
- Former names: Training Course in Personnel Administration, Management Training Program
- Type: Academic program
- Active: 1937–1963
- Parent institution: Radcliffe College, Harvard Business School
- Affiliations: Harvard University
- Location: Cambridge, Massachusetts, United States

The Harvard-Radcliffe Program in Business Administration was a joint program between Radcliffe College and Harvard Business School that provided women with post-graduate education in business administration.

== Alumnae ==
- Betty Jane Diener, academic administrator and politician
- Barbara Franklin, former U.S. Secretary of Commerce
- Barbara B. Kennelly, former congresswoman
- Patricia Ostrander
- Leslie Crocker Snyder, lawyer and former judge
