= Andrew D. Hughes =

American political staffer (born 1980s)

Andrew Hughes
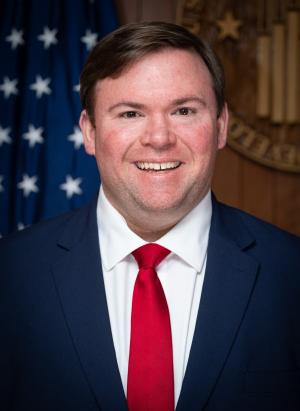
- Official portrait, 2018

United States Deputy Secretary of Housing and Urban Development
- Incumbent
- Assumed office June 27, 2025
- President: Donald Trump
- Preceded by: Adrianne Todman

Personal details
- Born: 1985 or 1986 (age 40–41)
- Party: Republican
- Education: Texas Tech University (BA)

Andrew D. Hughes (born 1985/1986) is an American government official who is serving as the 13th United States Deputy Secretary of Housing and Urban Development since June 27, 2025. During the first Trump administration, he was the chief of staff at the United States Department of Housing and Urban Development.

== Career ==
Prior to entering politics, Hughes spent time as a plumbing and HVAC salesman. He also worked as an Uber driver and was a special projects coordinator in the University of Texas System eight months prior to becoming a government employee. In his role at the University of Texas, he "managed social media and websites, compiled press releases, planned university events, researched funding opportunities and kept abreast of any legislation related to higher education," according to CNN.

Hughes entered politics as an employee for Ben Carson's 2016 presidential campaign, and later worked for Donald Trump's campaign. After Trump won the 2016 election, Hughes joined his first administration in January 2017 as the liaison of the Department of Housing and Urban Development (HUD) to the White House. By May 2018, he had risen to the position of chief of staff to the HUD, serving under Ben Carson, the department's secretary. He remained as chief of staff until the end of the first Trump administration at the start of 2021.

After his tenure as chief of staff, Hughes served as the executive director for Carson's American Cornerstone Institute. He returned to the HUD as chief of staff as part of the second Trump administration in 2025, and on March 11, 2025, was nominated by Trump to serve as the United States Deputy Secretary of Housing and Urban Development. His nomination received statements of support from secretary Scott Turner, Tim Scott, the chairman of the Senate Banking Committee, and the Mortgage Bankers Association. The full Senate confirmed Hughes in a 51-43 vote on June 10, 2025.

Political offices
Preceded by Adrianne Todman	United States Deputy Secretary of Housing and Urban Development; 2025–present	Incumbent
