= Betty Jane Diener =

American politician

4th Virginia Secretary of Commerce
- In office January 16, 1982 – January 18, 1986
- Governor: Chuck Robb
- Preceded by: Maurice B. Rowe III
- Succeeded by: Dick Bagley

Personal details
- Born: Betty Jane Diener; September 15, 1940 Washington, D.C., U.S.
- Died: January 23, 2015 (aged 74) Weston, Florida, U.S.
- Spouse: Robert Duane Bell
- Education: Wellesley College (BA); Harvard University (MBA, DBA)

Betty Jane Diener (September 15, 1940 – January 23, 2015) was an American academic administrator and politician. She served as the Virginia Secretary of Commerce from 1982 to 1986 during the administration of Governor Chuck Robb.

Diener was born on September 15, 1940, in Washington, D.C., and raised in nearby Arlington County, Virginia. She graduated from Washington-Lee High School in 1958. Diener received a bachelor's degree from Wellesley College in 1962 and a master's degree from Harvard Business School in 1964. She studied for the first year of her MBA in the Harvard-Radcliffe Program in Business Administration. In 1974, she also earned her doctorate business administration from Harvard Business School.

Diener served as an assistant dean and professor at Case Western Reserve University in Cleveland, Ohio. In 1979, Diener became the dean of the business school at Old Dominion University.

Virginia Governor Chuck Robb appointed Betty Jane Diener as the state Secretary of Commerce in 1982. As head of Commerce, Diener oversaw 22 state agencies and 52 boards and commissions, encompassing an annual budget of $945 million with approximately 4,000 state employees. She was responsible for a diverse array of issues, including agriculture, the environment, industry, labor and tourism. Betty Jane Diener removed the term "plantation" from Virginia tourism brochures, arguing that recalled the state's history of slavery prior to the American Civil War. She also advocated for stronger environmental regulations and new coal mining safety guidelines.

Following her tenure as Virginia Secretary of Commerce, Diener became both a provost and professor at the University of Massachusetts Boston. She then became a professor of management and analysis at the Andreas School of Business of Barry University in Miami Shores, Florida, from 2002 to 2012.

Diener, a resident of Fort Lauderdale, died from pulmonary fibrosis at a health clinic in Weston, Florida, on January 23, 2015, at the age of 73. Her husband, Robert D. Bell, died in 1993.
