= Brian D. Montgomery =

American government official (born 1956)

Brian Montgomery
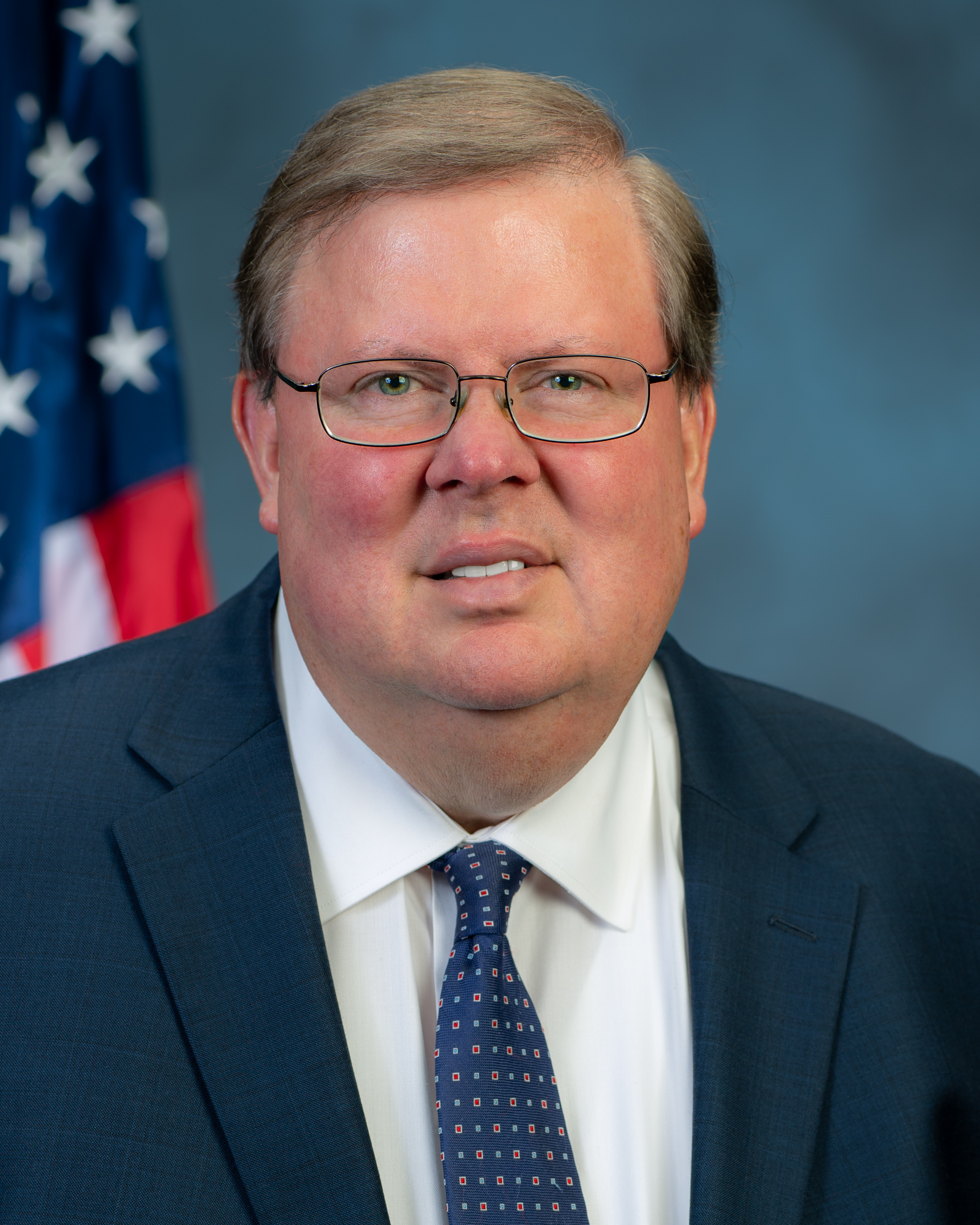
- Official portrait, 2018

11th United States Deputy Secretary of Housing and Urban Development
- In office May 12, 2020 – January 20, 2021; Acting: January 17, 2019 – May 12, 2020
- President: Donald Trump
- Preceded by: Pam Patenaude
- Succeeded by: Adrianne Todman

Assistant Secretary of Housing and Urban Development for Housing
- In office June 5, 2018 – May 12, 2020
- President: Donald Trump
- Preceded by: Carol Galante
- Succeeded by: Dana T. Wade
- In office February 2005 – July 2009
- President: George W. Bush; Barack Obama
- Preceded by: John Weicher
- Succeeded by: David Stevens

Acting United States Secretary of Housing and Urban Development
- In office January 20, 2009 – January 26, 2009
- President: Barack Obama
- Preceded by: Steve Preston
- Succeeded by: Shaun Donovan

White House Cabinet Secretary
- In office January 2003 – February 24, 2005
- President: George W. Bush
- Preceded by: Albert Hawkins
- Succeeded by: Heidi Smith

Personal details
- Born: August 2, 1956 (age 70) Austin, Texas, U.S.
- Party: Republican
- Education: University of Houston (BA)

Brian Darrell Montgomery (born August 2, 1956) is an American government official who served as the United States Deputy Secretary of Housing and Urban Development from 2020 to 2021. Montgomery previously served as Assistant Secretary of Housing and Urban Development for Housing and Federal Housing Commissioner from 2005 to 2009 and from 2018 to 2020. Montgomery is the only individual to serve as FHA Commissioner twice and under three U.S. Presidents (Bush, Obama, and Trump).

He formerly served as Assistant Secretary of Housing and Urban Development for Housing and Federal Housing Commissioner during the administration of George W. Bush. He was confirmed to the position in February 2005 and resigned in July 2009. President Donald Trump nominated him to return to his former position as Assistant Secretary of Housing and Urban Development for Housing, and he was confirmed by the Senate in May 2018. With the departure of Pam Patenaude in January 2019, he also served as the acting United States Deputy Secretary of Housing and Urban Development. In October 2019, Montgomery was nominated to become the next Deputy Secretary of Housing and Urban Development. He was confirmed to the position on May 12, 2020. Montgomery has co-chaired the National Association of HomeBuilders Mortgage Roundtable since May 2022 and was awarded the "Lifetime Achievement Award" in 2021 by the Five Star Institute. Montgomery achieved the CERT Certificate in Cyber Security Oversight from Carnegie Mellon University—Software Engineering Institute and NACD in April 2023.

== Early life and education ==
Born in Austin, Texas, Montgomery earned a Bachelor of Arts degree in political science University of Houston. He is an initiate of the Tau Kappa Epsilon fraternity's University of Texas at Austin chapter. Montgomery grew up in Houston, Texas and attended Westbury High School. He is the grandson of Mexican immigrants on his mother's side of the family.

== Career ==
From January 2001 until January 2003, Montgomery served as Deputy Assistant to the President and Director of Advance, and from January 2003 to April 2005, he served as Deputy Assistant to the President and Cabinet Secretary. While serving as Director of Presidential Advance, Montgomery was traveling with President George W. Bush on September 11, 2001 and with him at the Pentagon on September 12 and September 14 when President Bush was at Ground Zero. Montgomery and other White House staff were later awarded "September 11 Presidential Distinguished Service" recognition. While serving in the White House, Montgomery contributed to the policy process on a wide range of issues including the administration's efforts to boost homeownership, increase access to affordable housing, and to reform both the Real Estate Settlement Procedures Act and the government sponsored enterprises.

Following the Space Shuttle Columbia disaster in February 2003, Montgomery headed up a White House working group to monitor all facets of the accident investigation. This ultimately led to the process that developed the President's vision for space exploration. For this effort, Montgomery was awarded the NASA Exceptional Service Medal in June 2004.

=== Federal Housing commissioner ===
One of Montgomery's primary initiatives once he became Federal Housing commissioner in June 2005 was the creation and promotion of a bill designed to modernize the Federal Housing Administration. The Modernization Bill, which passed the House of Representatives in July 2006, is primarily focused on increasing borrower flexibility through both policy and programmatic changes. Included among them are increased loan limits, updated down payment assistance options, and a risk-based premium structure. The goal of the Modernization Bill was to provide low and moderate-income borrowers a safe homeownership option at a fair price.

Another one of Montgomery's priorities while at the Department of Housing and Urban Development was the preservation of affordable multifamily rental housing, achieved primarily through mortgage insurance as well as flexible refinancing options.

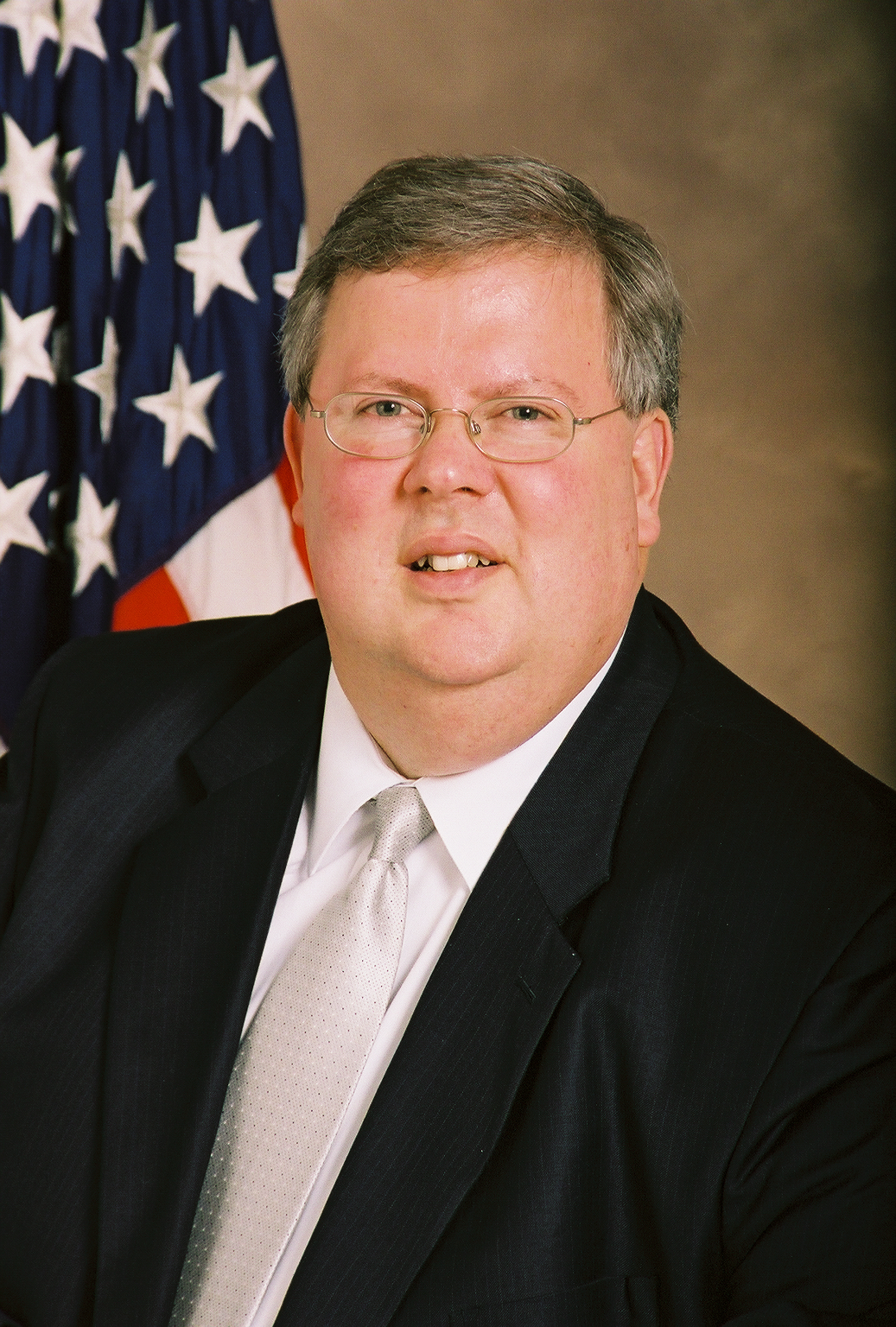
Montgomery's photo during the Bush administration

Montgomery's time at the Department of Housing and Urban Development has also been marked by extensive work with Hurricane Katrina disaster victims. He chaired the Department of Housing and Urban Development's Hurricane Recovery and Response Center at Headquarters and helped coordinate and secure temporary and long-term housing for displaced persons.

During Montgomery's tenure as Federal Housing Commissioner, the Department of Housing and Urban Development also launched a campaign meant to educate African-Americans looking to buy their first homes. He was interviewed by National Public Radio on the subject.

Montgomery was the 2008 recipient of the Robert J. Corletta Award for Achievement in Affordable Housing. The Corletta Award, presented annually by the National Association of Home Builders (NAHB) and the Neighborhood Development Collaborative (NDC), pays tribute to individuals who have shown extraordinary creativity and dedication to the cause of affordable housing.

Montgomery was nominated in 2017 to again serve as Assistant Secretary for Housing - Federal Housing Commissioner and confirmed by the Senate in May 2018. He concurrently served in that role and as Acting HUD Deputy Secretary beginning in January 2019.

=== Acting Secretary of Housing and Urban Development ===
Steve Preston, the fourteenth United States Secretary of Housing and Urban Development, left office on January 20, 2009, with the inauguration of Barack Obama as the 44th President of the United States. Montgomery assumed the position of acting secretary until Obama appointee Shaun Donovan was confirmed by the United States Senate on January 22. Donovan was sworn in on January 26.

=== Deputy Secretary, HUD ===
With the departure of Pam Patenaude in January 2019, Montgomery served as the acting United States Deputy Secretary of Housing and Urban Development. In October 2019, Montgomery was nominated to become the next Deputy Secretary of Housing and Urban Development. He was confirmed to the position on May 12, 2020. As Deputy Secretary, Montgomery oversaw both the FHA and Ginnie Mae while also managing the day-to-day operations of the agency including Disaster Recovery, Field Policy & Management, the Office of the Chief Financial Officer, the Office of the Chief Information Officer, and the Office of Administration. Montgomery also advised and assisted the Secretary in leading the Department's nearly 8,000 employees and $53 billion annual budget. Montgomery oversaw more than $55 billion in Disaster Recovery funding targeted at 17 states and the Commonwealth of Puerto Rico.

Montgomery led the agency's COVID-19 response which included a myriad of process and policy modifications and extensive coordination with the Consumer Financial Protection Bureau and Federal Housing Finance Agency to assist FHA borrowers impacted by the coronavirus. Montgomery also helped develop solutions for Public Housing Authorities and subsidized housing property owners dealing with impacted tenants as well as state/local governments and tribal nations as they assisted vulnerable constituencies including homeless populations.

Political offices
| Preceded by Albert Hawkins | White House Cabinet Secretary; 2003–2005 | Succeeded by Heidi Smith |
| Preceded by John Weicher | Assistant Secretary of Housing and Urban Development for Housing; 2005–2009 | Succeeded by David Stevens |
| Preceded by Steve Preston | United States Secretary of Housing and Urban Development; Acting; 2009 | Succeeded by Shaun Donovan |
| Preceded by Carol Galante | Assistant Secretary of Housing and Urban Development for Housing; 2018–2020 | Succeeded by Dana T. Wade |
| Preceded by Pam Patenaude | United States Deputy Secretary of Housing and Urban Development; 2019–2021 | Succeeded by Adrianne Todman |
