= Virginia's 92nd House of Delegates district =

Virginia legislative district

- District map from the 2023 election
- Delegate: Bonita Anthony

Virginia's 92nd House of Delegates district elects one of the 100 members of the Virginia House of Delegates, which is the lower house of the state's bicameral legislature.

The district is composed of parts of the cities of Chesapeake and Norfolk.

Following the 2021 Virginia redistricting, the district was formed from parts of the 77th, 89th, and 90th Virginia House of Delegates districts.

The district is currently represented by Bonita Anthony.

== District officeholders ==
Years	Delegate	Party	Electoral history
January 12, 1983 – January 8, 1986	Dick Bagley	Democratic	Ran for Governor
January 8, 1986 – January 13, 1988	Mary Christian	Independent	Retired
January 13, 1988 – January 14, 2004	Mary Christian	Democratic	Retired
January 14, 2004 – 2024	Jeion Ward	Democratic	First elected in 2003 In the 2017 election, Ward faced a primary challenge from Michael Harris.
January 14, 2024 – Present	Bonita Anthony	Democratic	
