= Mary Christian (politician) =

American educator and politician (1924–2019)

Mary Taylor Christian

Member of the Virginia House of Delegates from the 92nd district
- In office January 8, 1986 – January 14, 2004
- Preceded by: Richard M. Bagley
- Succeeded by: Jeion Ward

Personal details
- Born: Mary Esther Taylor; August 9, 1924 Hampton, Virginia, U.S.
- Died: November 11, 2019 (aged 95) Hampton, Virginia, U.S.
- Party: Democratic
- Spouse: Wilbur Christian
- Children: 3
- Education: Hampton University; Columbia University; Michigan State University
- Profession: University professor and dean

Mary Taylor Christian (August 9, 1924 – November 11, 2019) was an American educator and politician.

== Biography ==
Christian was born in Hampton, Virginia; her mother was a homemaker and her father was a businessman. She graduated from Phenix High School in Hampton in 1941. She very quickly married her high school sweetheart and had two kids, but by 19 had divorced him.

She started off as a young employee of the laundry department at Hampton University and later became a typist there. After being encouraged to get an education by a mentor, she earned her bachelor of science degree in education in 1955 from Hampton University. From 1955 until 1960, she worked as a teacher at Hampton City Schools, using her free summers to earn a master's degree in speech and drama from Columbia University in 1960. Christian then worked as a professor at Hampton University, and received her doctorate degree from Michigan State University in 1968.

In 1980, Christian was named the Dean of the Hampton University School of Education.

=== Research ===
During Christian’s time as an educator, she wrote multiple papers and dissertations about educational approaches. Her dissertation, “A Study of the Dimensions of the Nongraded School concepts” has been referenced in articles about educational practices. Christian was also active giving speeches and sessions through the Association for the Study of Negro Life and History. In 1970, her session was on teaching the Black experience with literature in schools.

=== Political career ===
Before becoming a delegate, Christian organized a voter registration drive in 1968, in which over a thousand people were able to register. She also worked as a campaign manager for four Virginia campaigns.

Christian served as a Hampton City School Board member in 1973, becoming the first African American woman to do so.

In 1986, Christian was elected to the Virginia House of Delegates; she was the first African American woman to become a delegate from Hampton since Reconstruction. Through her time as a Virginia delegate, she established herself as a qualified delegate, receiving honors for her service in politics and activism. She served seven terms, holding office until 2003. She was a Democrat. Christian served on the Education, Rules, and Appropriations Committees.

Outside of Christian’s political and educational activism, she was a member of countless boards and committees. She was involved in the Virginia Legislative Black Caucus as the Chair, Junior League of Hampton Roads, Hampton City School Board, was the past president of the Peninsula Association for Sickle Cell Anemia, American Association of University Women, Council member of NAACP Virginia. She was also the codirector of the Barrett - Peake Heritage Foundation. Christian was also active in her church, First Baptist Church, in Hampton, Virginia.

== Death and legacy ==
Mary Christian died on November 11, 2019 at the age of 95. After her death in 2019, Christian was recognized and mourned by many people across Virginia and the United States. Virginia delegates, representatives and other politicians spoke about her willingness to fight for change, justice and equality. Christian was identified as having continuously fought for education, people of color, and healthcare.

She had a performing arts auditorium named after her at Virginia Peninsula Community College.

Mary T. Christian Elementary School of Hampton City Schools was also named after her.

She was called ‘Dr. C’ by her many students.

== See also ==
- Christian reflecting on the Voting Rights Act in 2015
