= Richard M. Bagley =

American politician (1927–2001)

Dick Bagley

5th Virginia Secretary of Economic Development
- In office January 18, 1986 – July 1, 1988
- Governor: Gerald Baliles
- Preceded by: Betty Jane Diener
- Succeeded by: Curry Roberts

Member of the Virginia House of Delegates
- In office January 12, 1966 – January 8, 1986
- Preceded by: E. Ralph James
- Succeeded by: Mary Christian
- Constituency: 26th district (1966‍–‍1972); 50th district (1972‍–‍1982); 45th district (1982‍–‍1983); 92nd district (1983‍–‍1986)

Personal details
- Born: Richard Marshall Bagley; May 14, 1927 Hampton, Virginia, U.S.
- Died: December 13, 2001 (aged 74) Newport News, Virginia, U.S.
- Party: Democratic
- Spouse: Nancy May Murray (m. 1949)
- Education: Virginia Tech (BS)

Richard Marshall Bagley Sr. (May 14, 1927 – December 13, 2001) was an American politician who served for two decades as a member of the Virginia House of Delegates. He announced a run for governor in the 1985 election but dropped out before the Democratic primary, which was eventually won by Gerald Baliles. He then sought the chairmanship of the Democratic Party of Virginia but stepped aside to allow Dick Davis to take the position.
