= Patrick Gottschalk =

American politician, attorney (born 1953)

14th Virginia Secretary of Commerce
- In office January 14, 2006 – January 16, 2010
- Governor: Tim Kaine
- Preceded by: Michael J. Schewel
- Succeeded by: Jim Cheng

Personal details
- Born: Patrick Owen Gottschalk; April 22, 1953 (age 73) Albuquerque, New Mexico
- Spouse: Michele
- Education: U.S. Naval Academy (B.S.); University of Virginia (J.D.)

Military service
- Allegiance: United States
- Branch/service: United States Navy
- Years of service: 1975–1980

Patrick Owen "Pat" Gottschalk (born April 22, 1953) is an American attorney. A partner at Williams Mullen, he previously served as Virginia Secretary of Commerce under Governor Tim Kaine.

Political offices
Preceded by Michael J. Schewel	Virginia Secretary of Commerce; 2006–2010	Succeeded by Jim Cheng
