= Michael J. Schewel =

American attorney (born 1953)

13th Virginia Secretary of Commerce
- In office January 12, 2002 – January 14, 2006
- Governor: Mark Warner
- Preceded by: Joshua N. Lief
- Succeeded by: Patrick Gottschalk

Personal details
- Born: Michael Jay Schewel; May 8, 1953 (age 72) Lynchburg, Virginia, U.S.
- Party: Democratic
- Spouse: Priscilla Burbank
- Parent: Elliot Schewel (father)
- Education: Princeton University (AB); University of Virginia (JD)

Michael Jay Schewel (born May 8, 1953) is an American attorney. A partner at McGuireWoods, he previously served as Virginia Secretary of Commerce under Governor Mark Warner. He is a son of state senator Elliot Schewel.

Political offices
Preceded by Joshua N. Lief	Virginia Secretary of Commerce; 2002–2006	Succeeded by Patrick Gottschalk
