= Adrianne Todman =

American government official

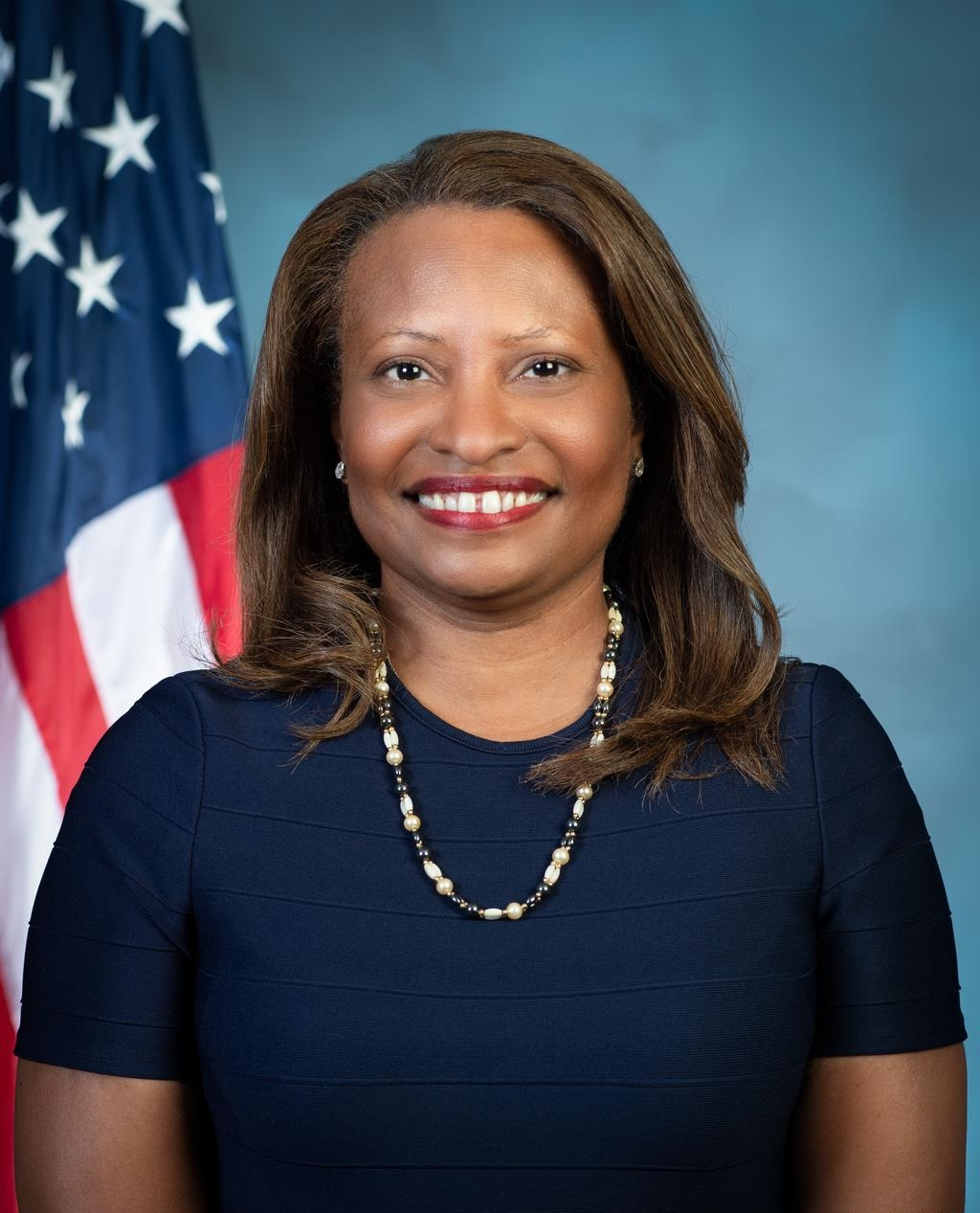
- Official portrait, 2021

United States Secretary of Housing and Urban Development
- Acting; March 22, 2024 – January 20, 2025
- President: Joe Biden
- Preceded by: Marcia Fudge
- Succeeded by: Scott Turner

12th United States Deputy Secretary of Housing and Urban Development
- In office June 14, 2021 – January 20, 2025
- President: Joe Biden
- Preceded by: Brian Montgomery
- Succeeded by: Andrew Hughes

Personal details
- Born: Adrianne Regina Todman c. 1970 (age 55–56) Saint Thomas, U.S. Virgin Islands
- Education: Smith College (BA)

Adrianne Regina Todman (born c. 1970) is an American government official who served as the deputy secretary of housing and urban development in the Biden administration from June 2021 to January 2025. Todman served as acting secretary of housing and urban development upon Marcia Fudge's resignation in March 2024. Todman was previously the CEO of the National Association of Housing and Redevelopment Officials and also worked in the Department of Housing and Urban Development.

== Early life and education ==
Todman was born and raised in the United States Virgin Islands. She graduated from Smith College in 1991.

== Career ==
Todman worked as a legislative director for Congressman Ron de Lugo. She later joined the United States Department of Housing and Urban Development, where she worked as a policy aide in the Office of Public and Indian Housing and office of the director. Todman later worked as the executive director of the District of Columbia Housing Authority. In 2017, she was selected as the CEO of the National Association of Housing and Redevelopment Officials.

On June 10, 2021, her nomination to serve as United States Deputy Secretary of Housing and Urban Development was confirmed by the US Senate with unanimous consent. She was sworn in by Secretary Marcia Fudge on June 14 of that year.

Todman assumed the role of acting secretary of housing and urban development upon the resignation of Fudge in March 2024.

Political offices
Preceded by Brian D. Montgomery	United States Deputy Secretary of Housing and Urban Development; 2021–2025	Succeeded by Andrew D. Hughes
Preceded by Marcia Fudge	United States Secretary of Housing and Urban Development; Acting; 2024–2025	Succeeded by Matt Ammon; Acting
