= Jeion Ward =

American politician (born 1954)

Member of the Virginia House of Delegates
- Incumbent
- Assumed office January 14, 2004
- Preceded by: Mary Christian
- Constituency: 92nd district (2004–2024); 87th district (2024–present)

Personal details
- Born: Jeion Antonia Joyner; January 6, 1954 (age 72) Newport News, Virginia, U.S.
- Party: Democratic
- Spouse(s): James A. Ward, Sr.
- Children: 3
- Education: Thomas Nelson Community College; Christopher Newport University
- Profession: Middle school teacher
- Committees: Labor and Commerce; Transportation; Communications, Technology and Innovation; Rules
- Website: Delegate Jeion Ward

Jeion Antonia Ward (born January 6, 1954) is an American politician of the Democratic Party. Since 2004 she has been a member of the Virginia House of Delegates. She currently represents the 87th district in the city of Hampton.

As of May 2020, Ward serves as the Chair of the Labor and Commerce Committee and as a member of the Transportation Committee, Communications, Technology and Innovation Committee, and the Rules Committee. In 2026, Ward introduced legislation to increase the minimum wage to $15 by 2028 and increase annually with inflation.

Ward has been diagnosed with multiple sclerosis.
