= Pam Patenaude =

American government official (born 1961)

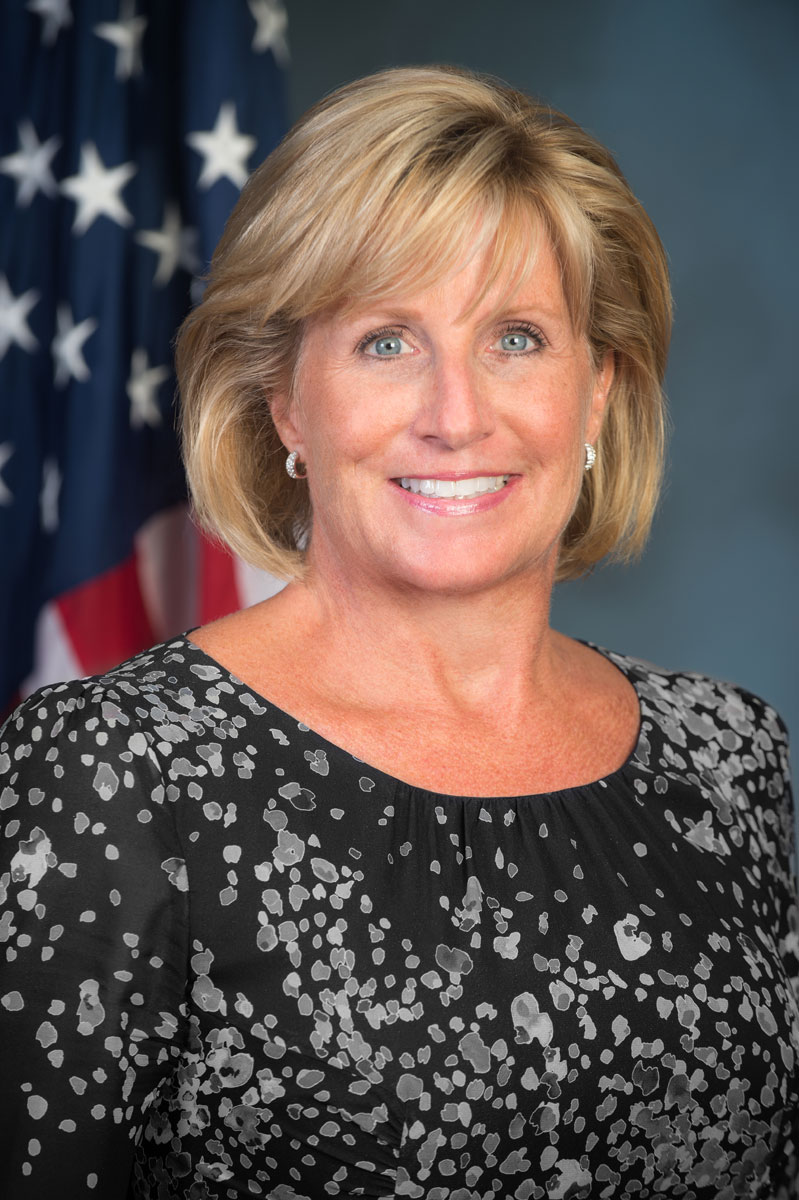

10th United States Deputy Secretary of Housing and Urban Development
- In office September 27, 2017 – January 17, 2019
- President: Donald Trump
- Preceded by: Nani A. Coloretti
- Succeeded by: Brian D. Montgomery

United States Assistant Secretary of Housing and Urban Development for Community Planning and Development
- In office 2005–2007
- President: George W. Bush
- Preceded by: Roy Bernardi
- Succeeded by: Susan Peppler

Personal details
- Born: January 20, 1961 (age 65) Pittsburgh, Pennsylvania, U.S.
- Party: Republican
- Education: Saint Anselm College (BS); Southern New Hampshire University (MS)

Pamela Hughes Patenaude (born January 20, 1961) is a former United States Deputy Secretary of Housing and Urban Development, having served from September 2017 to January 2019, under President Donald Trump.

== Early life and education ==
Patenaude was raised in New Hampshire and attended Saint Anselm College, graduating in 1983. She later received a master's degree (M.A.) in community economic development from Southern New Hampshire University.

== Career ==
Prior to her position at HUD, she served as president of the J. Ronald Terwilliger Foundation for Housing America's Families and as director of housing policy at the Bipartisan Policy Center. She served as Housing and Urban Development Assistant Secretary for Community, Planning and Development during the George W. Bush administration.

=== Trump administration ===
She was proposed as a candidate for Secretary of Housing and Urban Development in the Trump administration, but was ultimately nominated for the role of Deputy Secretary under eventual Secretary Ben Carson.

Patenaude's nomination was praised by the Senate delegation of her home state of New Hampshire, both of whom are Democrats. Senator Maggie Hassan stated that "I am confident that she will continue to be an advocate for affordable housing opportunities in New Hampshire and across America." This nomination was confirmed by an 80–17 vote of the U.S. Senate on September 14, 2017.

She resigned at the end of 2018 after a series of disagreements with Carson and the Trump White House, including addressing racial segregation and the Trump administration's effort to withhold congressionally appropriated money to Puerto Rico for Hurricane Maria relief.

== Photos ==
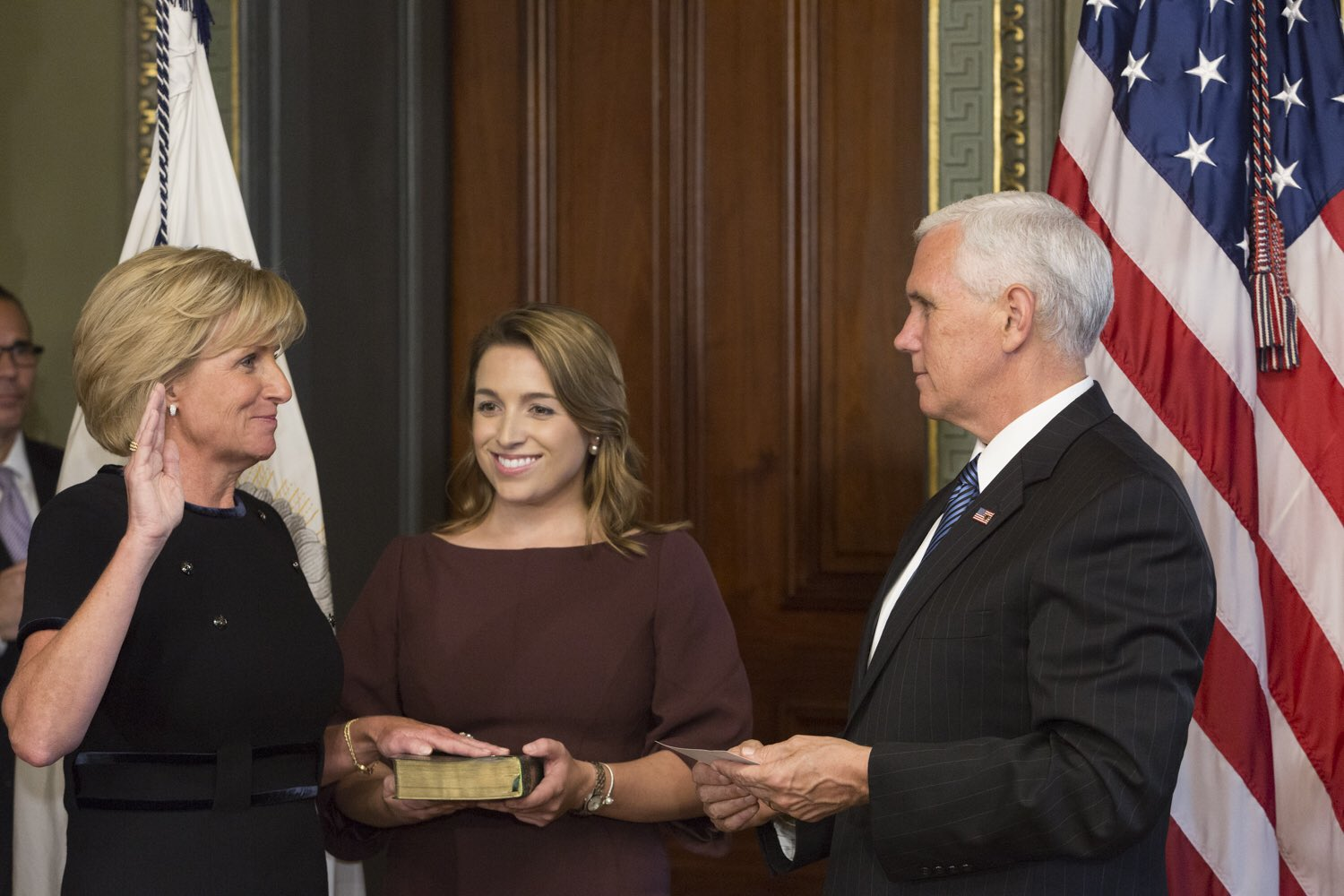
Patenaude being sworn in as Deputy Secretary by Vice President Mike Pence in 2017

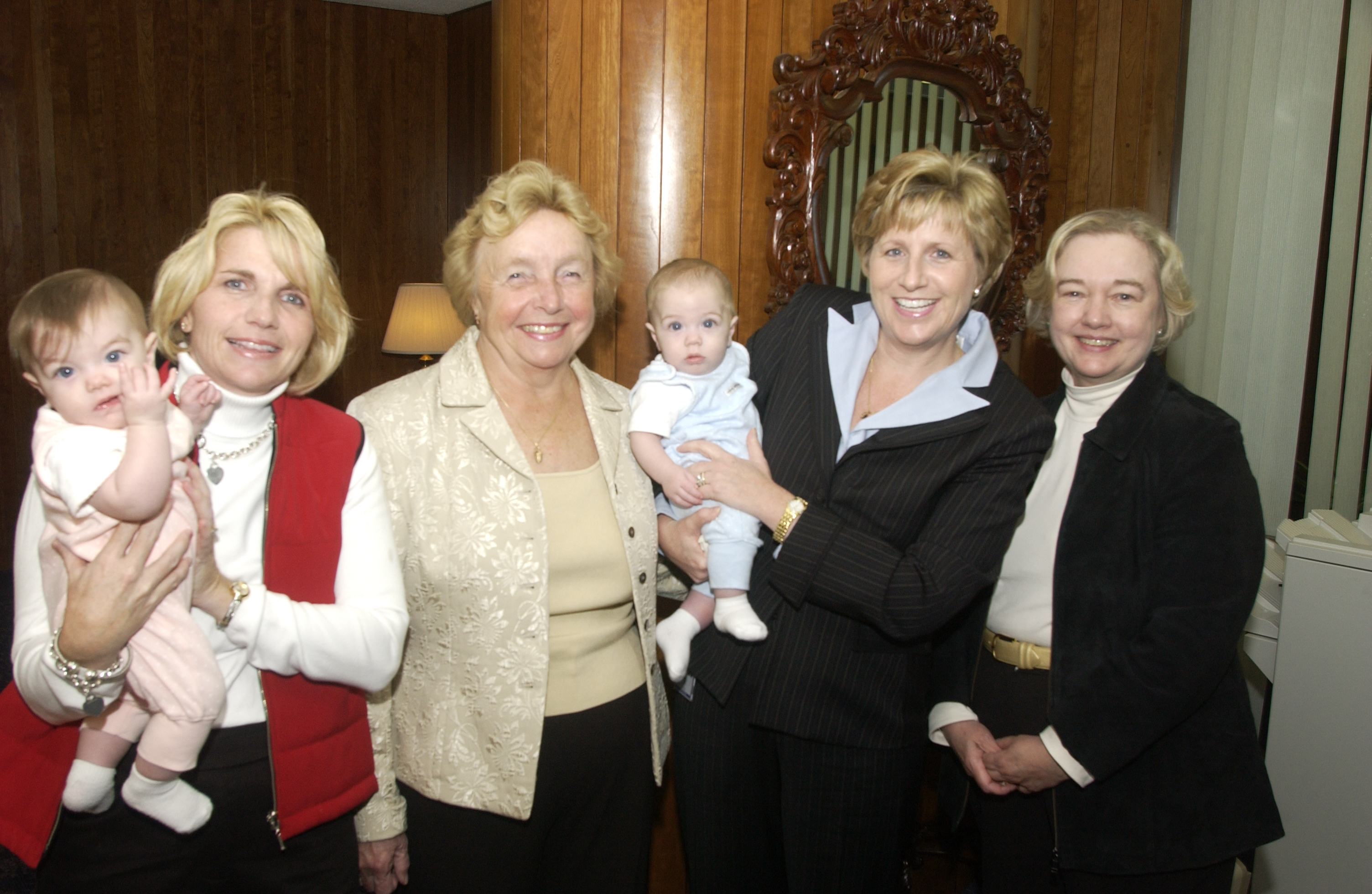
Patenaude with family members in 2005

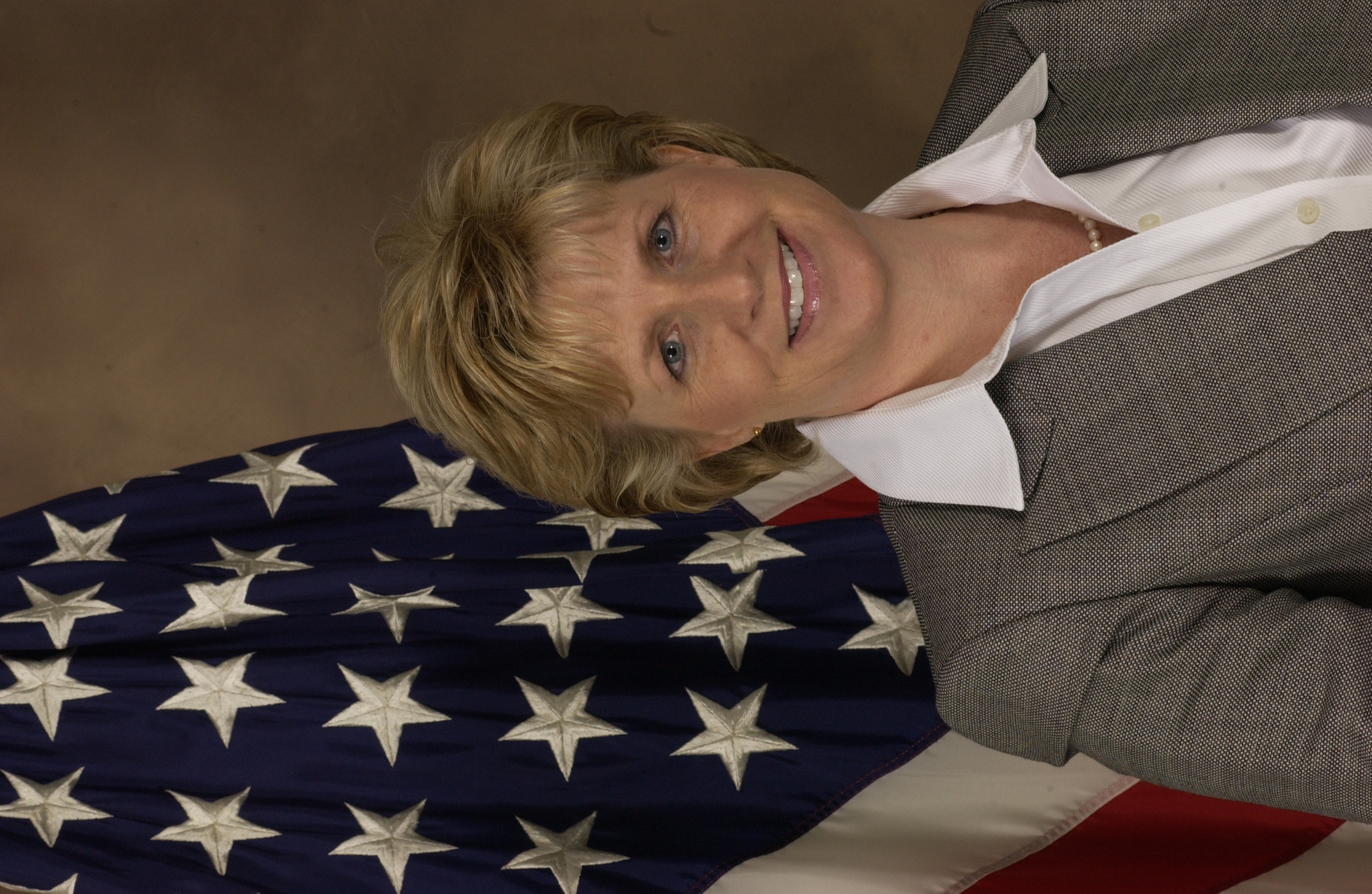
Patenaude's official photo during the Bush administration in 2004

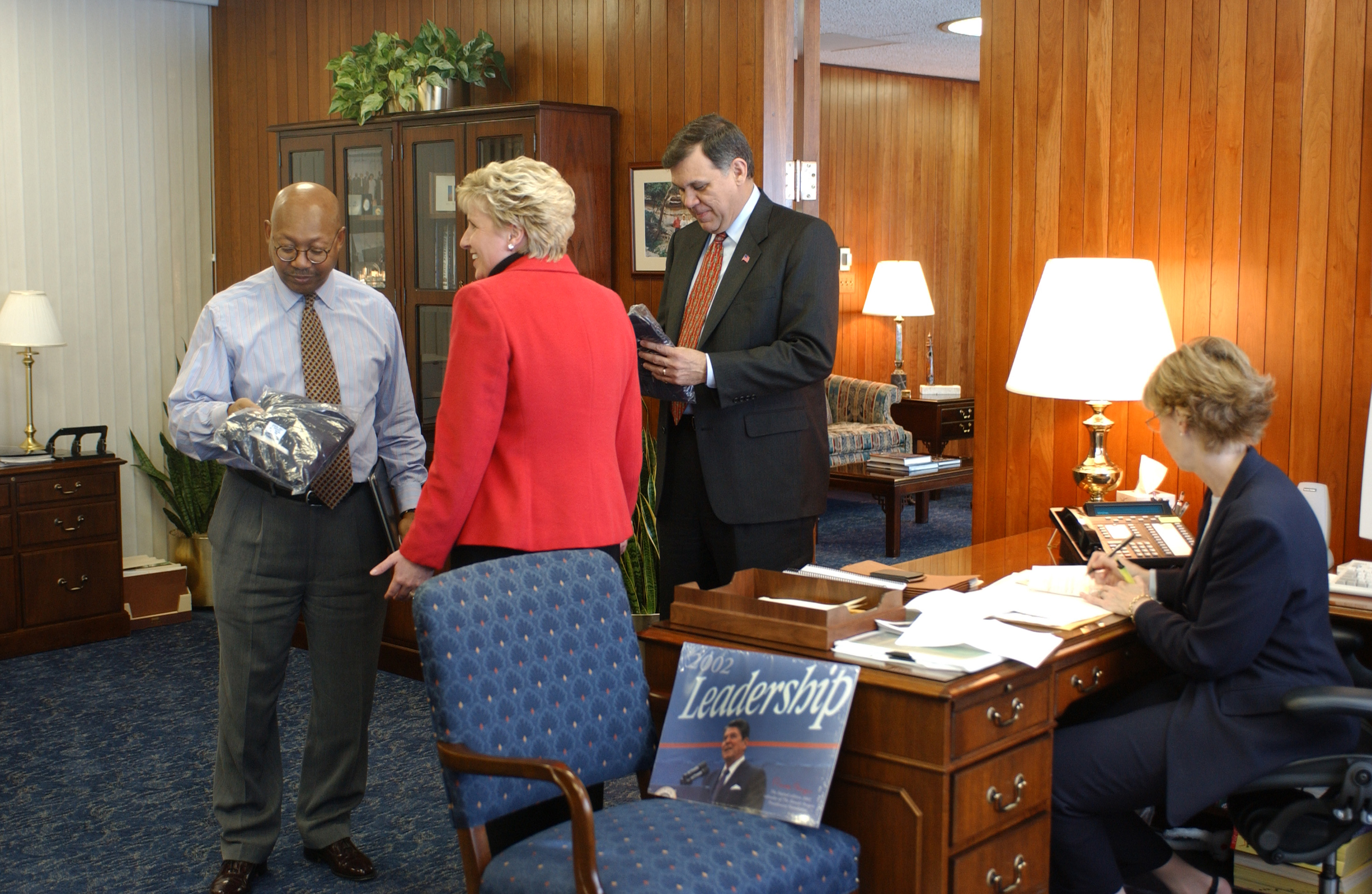
Patenaude with Mel Martinez and Alphonso Jackson in 2002

Political offices
Preceded by Nani A. Coloretti	United States Deputy Secretary of Housing and Urban Development; 2017–2019	Succeeded by Brian D. Montgomery
