= Schewels Home =

Furniture retail company based in Lynchburg, Virginia

- Industry: Retail
- Founded: 1897 in Lynchburg, Virginia
- Founder: Elias Schewel
- Headquarters: Lynchburg, Virginia
- Website: schewelshome.com

Schewels Home, formerly known as Schewel Furniture, is a furniture retail company based in Lynchburg, Virginia. It was founded by Elias Schewel, a Lithuanian immigrant, in 1897. The company rebranded as Schewels Home in 2019. As of 2022, it had 50 stores in Virginia, West Virginia, and North Carolina. The company is run by fourth and fifth generation members of the Schewel family, making it one of the oldest family-owned furniture companies in the United States.
