= Languages of the United States =

- Official: English (Note: Per Executive Order 14224)
- National: English; 247,695,110 speakers at home (77.0%) (Note: U.S. residents aged five and above, per the American Community Survey (ACS) of the U.S. Census Bureau)
- Indigenous: Cherokee, Choctaw, Dakota, Hopi, Keres, Kiowa, Lakota, Miwuk, Muscogee, Navajo, Ojibwe, O'odham, Western Apache, Zuni Others Abenaki, Achumawi, Acolapissa, Adai, Afro-Seminole Creole, Alabama, Aleut, Apalachee, Aranama, Arapaho, Arikara, Assiniboine, Atakapa, Atsugewi, Awaswas, Barbareño, Bay Miwok, Biloxi, Blackfoot, Buena Vista, Caddo, Cahto, Calusa, Carolina Algonquian, Catawba, Cayuga, Cayuse, Central Kalapuya, Central Pomo, Central Sierra Miwok, Chalon, Chemakum, Cheyenne, Chickasaw, Chico, Chimariko, Chinook Jargon, Chippewa, Chitimacha, Chiwere, Chochenyo, Choctaw, Chukchansi, Coast Miwok, Coast Tsimshian, Coahuilteco, Cocopah, Coeur d'Alene, Colorado River, Columbia-Moses, Comanche, Coree, Cotoname, Cowlitz, Cree, Crow, Cruzeño, Cupeño, Eastern Pomo, Erie, Esselen, Etchemin, Eyeri, Fox, Garza, Gashowu, Gros Ventre, Gullah, Halchidhoma, Halkomelem, Hanis, Havasupai, Havasupai–Hualapai, Hawaiian Pidgin, Hidatsa, Hitchiti, Houma, Hupa, Ipai, Ivilyuat, Jicarilla, Kansa, Karankawa, Karkin, Karuk, Kashaya, Kathlamet, Kawaiisu, Kings River, Kiowa, Kitanemuk, Kitsai, Klallam, Klamath, Klickitat, Koasati, Konkow, Konomihu, Kumeyaay, Kutenai, Lake Miwok, Lipan, Louisiana Creole, Lower Tanana, Luiseño, Lummi, Lushootseed, Mahican, Maidu, Makah, Malecite-Passamaquoddy, Mandan, Maricopa, Massachusett, Mattole, Mednyj Aleut, Menominee, Mescalero-Chiricahua, Miami-Illinois, Mikasuki, Mi'kmaq, Miluk, Mitchigamea, Mobilian Jargon, Mohawk, Mohawk Dutch, Mohegan-Pequot, Mojave, Molala, Moneton, Mono, Munsee, Muscogee, Mutsun, Nanticoke, Natchez, Nawathinehena, Negerhollands, Neutral, New River Shasta, Nez Perce, Nicoleño, Nisenan, Nlaka'pamux, Nomlaki, Nooksack, Northeastern Pomo, Northern Kalapuya, Northern Paiute, Northern Pomo, Northern Sierra Miwok, Nottoway, Obispeño, Ofo, Okanagan, Okwanuchu, Omaha–Ponca, Oneida, Onondaga, Osage, Ottawa, Palewyami, Pamunkey, Pawnee, Pennsylvania Dutch, Picuris, Piscataway, Plains Apache, Plains Cree, Plains Miwok Potawatomi, Powhatan, Purisimeño, Qawiaraq, Quapaw, Quechan, Quileute, Quinault, Quinipissa, Quiripi, Ramaytush, Rumsen, Saanich, Sahaptin, Salinan, Salish-Spokane-Kalispel, Scahentoarrhonon, Seneca, Serrano, Shasta, Shawnee, Shoshoni, Sioux, Siuslaw, Solano, Southeastern Pomo, Southern Pomo, Southern Sierra Miwok, Southern Tiwa, Stoney, Susquehannock, Taensa, Takelma, Tamyen, Tangipahoa, Taos, Tataviam, Tawasa, Tequesta, Tewa, Tillamook, Timbisha, Timucua, Tiipai, Tolowa, Tongva, Tonkawa, Tsetsaut, Tübatulabal, Tunica, Tuscarora, Tutelo, Tututni, Twana, Umatilla, Unami, Upper Chinook, Ute, Ventureño, Virgin Islands Creole, Wailaki, Wappo, Washo, Wenrohronon, Whulshootseed, Wichita, Winnebago, Wintu, Wiyot, Woccon, Wukchumni, Wyandot, Yamasee, Yana, Yaqui, Yavapai, Yoncalla, Yuchi, Yuki, Yurok
- Regional: Ahtna, Aleut, Alutiiq, Caribbean Spanish, Carolinian, Central Alaskan Yup'ik, Central Siberian Yupik, Chamorro, Deg Xinag, Delaware Valley English, Dena’ina, Eyak, Gullah, Gwich’in, Haida, Hän, Hawaiian, Holikachuk, Isleño Spanish, Inland Northern English, Inupiaq, Koyukon, Louisiana French, Mexican Spanish, Midland American English, New England English, New Jersey English, New Mexican Spanish, New York City English, North-Central American English, Pennsylvania Dutch, Puerto Rican Spanish, Sabine River Spanish, Samoan, Southern American English, Tanacross, Tanana, Texan English, Texas German, Tlingit, Tsimshian, Upper Kuskokwim, Upper Tanana, Virgin Islands Creole, Western American English
- Vernacular: African American Vernacular English
- Minority: Spoken at home by more than 1 million people (2024): Spanish, 44,867,699 (13.9%); Chinese, 3,734,956 (1.2%); Tagalog, 1,921,526 (0.6%); Vietnamese, 1,599,409 (0.5%); Arabic, 1,484,439 (0.5%); French, 1,276,702 (0.4%); Korean, 1,150,701 (0.4%); Portuguese, 1,099,503 (0.3%); Hindi, 1,059,933 (0.3%); Haitian Creole, 1,041,231 (0.3%); Russian, 1,021,165 (0.3%)
- Signed: American Sign Language, Black American Sign Language, Hawaiʻi Sign Language, Keresan Sign Language, Navajo Family Sign, Plains Indian Sign Language, Puerto Rican Sign Language, Samoan Sign Language
- Keyboard layout: QWERTY

The most commonly used language in the United States is English (specifically the American English set of varieties), which is the national language and de facto official language. While the U.S. Congress has never declared a statutory official language, the federal government primarily uses English and a 2025 executive order declared English official. In addition, 32 U.S. states out of 50 and all five U.S. territories have laws that recognize English as an official language. Of these, three states and most territories have adopted English plus one or more other official languages. Overall, 430 languages are spoken or signed by the population, of which 177 are indigenous to the U.S. or its territories, and accommodations for non-English-language speakers are sometimes made under various federal, state, and local laws.

The majority of the U.S. population (77%) speaks only English at home as of 2024, according to the American Community Survey (ACS) of the U.S. Census Bureau. The second most common language by far is Spanish, spoken by 14% of the population, followed by Chinese, spoken by around 1% of the population. Other languages spoken by over a million residents are Tagalog, Vietnamese, Arabic, French, Korean, Portuguese, Hindi, Haitian Creole, and Russian. Although some 22.3% of U.S. residents speak a language other than English at home, only 8.4% report that they speak English less than "very well".

Many residents of the U.S. unincorporated territories speak their own native languages or a local language, such as Spanish in Puerto Rico and English in the U.S. Virgin Islands. Over the course of U.S. history, many languages have been brought into what became the United States from Europe, Africa, Asia, other parts of the Americas, and Oceania. Some of these languages have developed into dialects and dialect families (examples include African-American English, Pennsylvania Dutch, and Gullah), creole languages (such as Louisiana Creole), and pidgin languages. American Sign Language (ASL) and Interlingua, an international auxiliary language, were created in the United States.

== History ==
=== Statistics ===
Below are all languages that ranked among the top ten in the United States by total number of speakers at home in the 1910 census, 1940 census, 1970 census, 2000 census, and 2024 American Community Survey. Figures appear in bold for any language that also ranked among the top ten in a specific census or survey year. Data from 1910 and 1940 cover only the contiguous U.S. (48 states and the District of Columbia); figures for 1970, 2000 and 2024 include Alaska and Hawaii.

Languages in the United States (1910−2024)
Language	1910		1940		1970		2000		2024	
Language	Pop.	%	Pop.	%	Pop.	%	Pop.	%	Pop.	%
Arabic	46,727	0.05%	107,420	0.08%	193,112	0.1%	614,582	0.23%	**1,484,439**	**0.46%**
Chinese	71,531 (Note: Not enumerated in 1910; number provided is that of respondents identifying their ethnic group as "Chinese".)	0.08%	77,504 (Note: Not enumerated in 1940; number provided is that of respondents identifying their ethnic group as "Chinese".)	0.06%	345,431	0.17%	**2,022,143**	**0.77%**	**3,734,956**	**1.16%**
Czech	**539,392**	**0.58%**	520,440	0.39%	452,812	0.22%	70,500	0.03%	(Note: Not enumerated in 2024.)	
English	**69,353,758** (Note: Sum of all 10,037,420 respondents "of foreign stock" (either foreign-born or with at least one foreign-born parent) who listed "White" as their ethnicity and "English" as their mother tongue, all 49,488,575 who listed "White" as their ethnicity and were native-born to native-born parents, and all 9,827,763 respondents who listed "Negro" as their ethnicity.)	**75.2%**	**105,905,158** (Note: Sum of all 93,039,640 respondents who listed "White" as their ethnicity and "English" as their mother tongue, and all 12,865,518 respondents who listed "Negro" as their ethnicity.)	**80.32%**	**160,717,113**	**79.09%**	**215,423,557**	**82.11%**	**247,695,110**	**76.98%**
French	**1,357,169**	**1.47%**	**1,412,060**	**1.07%**	**2,598,408**	**1.28%**	**1,643,838**	**0.63%**	**1,276,702**	**0.4%**
German	**8,817,271**	**9.56%**	**4,949,780**	**3.75%**	**6,093,054**	**3%**	**1,382,613**	**0.53%**	874,078	0.27%
Hindi	(Note: Not enumerated in 1910. 2,545 census respondents identified their ethnic group as "Hindu", but it is likely that most of these were Punjabi speakers.)		(Note: Not enumerated in 1940. 2,405 census respondents identified their ethnic group as "Hindu", but it is likely that most of these were Punjabi speakers.)		26,253 (Note: includes Urdu speakers. In 2000, the first census to differentiate between Hindi and Urdu speakers, there were 317,070 Hindi speakers and 285,369 Urdu speakers in the U.S. Hindi and Urdu are considered mutually intelligible registers of the same language.)	0.01%	317,057 (Note: excludes 285,369 Urdu speakers, making up 0.11% of the nation. Hindi and Urdu are considered mutually intelligible registers of the same language.)	0.12%	**1,059,933** (Note: excludes 561,196 Urdu speakers, making up 0.17% of the nation. Hindi and Urdu are considered mutually intelligible registers of the same language.)	**0.33%**
Italian	**2,151,422**	**2.33%**	**3,766,820**	**2.86%**	**4,144,315**	**2.04%**	**1,008,370**	**0.38%**	507,347	0.16%
Korean	462 (Note: Not enumerated in 1910; number provided is that of respondents identifying their ethnic group as "Korean".)	0%	1,711 (Note: Not enumerated in 1940; number provided is that of respondents identifying their ethnic group as "Korean".)	0%	53,528	0.03%	**894,063**	**0.34%**	**1,150,701**	**0.36%**
Norwegian	**1,009,854**	**1.09%**	**658,220**	**0.5%**	**612,862**	**0.3%**	55,465	0.02%	(Note: Not enumerated in 2024.)	
Polish	**1,707,640**	**1.85%**	**2,416,320**	**1.83%**	**2,437,938**	**1.2%**	667,414	0.25%	508,512	0.16%
Portuguese	141,268	0.15%	215,860	0.16%	365,300	0.18%	564,630	0.22%	**1,099,503**	**0.34%**
Russian	95,137	0.1%	**585,080**	**0.44%**	334,615	0.16%	**706,242**	**0.27%**	1,021,165	0.32%
Slovak	284,444	0.31%	484,360	0.37%	**510,366**	**0.25%**	41,300	0.02%	(Note: Not enumerated in 2024.)	
Spanish	**448,198**	**0.49%**	**1,861,400**	**1.41%**	**7,823,583**	**3.85%**	**28,101,052**	**10.71%**	**44,867,699**	**13.95%**
Swedish	**1,445,869**	**1.57%**	**830,900**	**0.63%**	**626,102**	**0.31%**	67,655	0.03%	(Note: Not enumerated in 2024.)	
Tagalog	160 (Note: Not enumerated in 1910; number provided is that of respondents identifying their ethnic group as "Filipino".)	0%	45,553 (Note: Not enumerated in 1940; number provided is that of respondents identifying their ethnic group as "Filipino".)	0.03%	217,907	0.11%	**1,224,241**	**0.47%**	**1,921,526**	**0.6%**
Vietnamese	(Note: Not enumerated in 1910. On the ethnicity question of the census, 0 respondents indicated any answer choice than "White", "Negro", "Indian" (Native American), "Chinese", "Japanese", "Filipino", "Hindu", "Korean", or "Maori". The number of Vietnamese speakers in the United States as of 1910 is thus likely around 0.)		(Note: Not enumerated in 1940. 131 census respondents identified "Other Asian" as their ethnicity, with the other options including "White", "Negro", "Indian" (Native American), "Chinese", "Japanese", "Filipino", "Hindu", "Korean", and "Polynesian". The number of Vietnamese speakers in the United States as of 1940 is thus likely close to 0.)		(Note: Not enumerated in 1970. The language is estimated to have been spoken by about 3,000 people in the U.S. in 1970, or 0.0015% of the American population.)		**1,009,627**	**0.38%**	**1,599,409**	**0.5%**
Yiddish	**1,676,762**	**1.82%**	**1,751,100**	**1.33%**	**1,593,993**	**0.78%**	178,945	0.07%	(Note: Not enumerated in 2024.)	
Total responses	92,228,496	100%	131,846,445	100%	203,210,158	100%	262,375,152	100%	321,745,943	100%

In 1910, the most spoken languages in New York State were English (5,178,081, or 56.82% of the population), (Note: Sum of all 1,813,885 respondents "of foreign stock" (either foreign-born or with at least one foreign-born parent) who listed "White" as their ethnicity and "English" as their mother tongue, all 3,230,005 who listed "White" as their ethnicity and were native-born to native-born parents, and all 134,191 respondents who listed "Negro" as their ethnicity.) German (1,333,013, or 14.63%), Yiddish (912,692, or 10.01%), Italian (745,669, or 8.18%), and Polish (283,733, or 3.11%). In 2024, they were English (12,869,930, or 68.35% of the population), Spanish (2,826,836, or 15.01%), Chinese (646,302, or 3.43%), Russian (209,622, or 1.11%), and Bengali (192,476, or 1.02%).

In 1910, the most spoken languages in Massachusetts were English (2,382,545, or 70.77% of the population), (Note: Sum of all 1,241,090 respondents "of foreign stock" (either foreign-born or with at least one foreign-born parent) who listed "White" as their ethnicity and "English" as their mother tongue, all 1,103,400 who listed "White" as their ethnicity and were native-born to native-born parents, and all 38,055 respondents who listed "Negro" as their ethnicity.) French (312,667, or 9.29%), Italian (132,473, or 3.94%), Yiddish (114,190, or 3.39%), and German (87,602, or 2.6%). In 2024, they were English (5,034,353, or 74.15% of the population), Spanish (670,417, or 9.87%), Portuguese (247,638, or 3.65%), Chinese (153,698, or 2.26%), and Haitian Creole(86,961, or 1.28%).

In 1910, the most spoken languages in Illinois were English (3,395,029, or 60.21% of the population), (Note: Sum of all 686,146 respondents "of foreign stock" (either foreign-born or with at least one foreign-born parent) who listed "White" as their ethnicity and "English" as their mother tongue, all 2,599,834 who listed "White" as their ethnicity and were native-born to native-born parents, and all 109,049 respondents who listed "Negro" as their ethnicity.) German (981,956, or 17.41%), Polish (274,661, or 4.87%), Swedish (236,023, or 4.19%), and Czech (124,225, or 2.2%). In 2024, they were English (9,101,368, or 75.5% of the population), Spanish (1,702,816, or 14.13%), Polish (157,649, or 1.31%), Chinese (117,166, or 0.97%), and Tagalog (84,264, or 0.7%).

In 1910, the most spoken languages in Wisconsin were English (977,170, or 41.87% of the population), (Note: Sum of all 211,097 respondents "of foreign stock" (either foreign-born or with at least one foreign-born parent) who listed "White" as their ethnicity and "English" as their mother tongue, all 763,173 who listed "White" as their ethnicity and were native-born to native-born parents, and all 2,900 respondents who listed "Negro" as their ethnicity.) German (758,647, or 32.51%), Norwegian (161,310, or 6.91%), Polish (128,915, or 5.52%), and Swedish (61,693, or 2.64%). In 2024, they were English (5,112,522, or 90.36% of the population), Spanish (296,785, or 5.25%), Hmong (36,777, or 0.65%), German (26,203, or 0.46%), and Chinese (17,977, or 0.32%).

In 1910, the most spoken languages in Minnesota were English (794,425, or 38.27% of the population), (Note: Sum of all 212,344 respondents "of foreign stock" (either foreign-born or with at least one foreign-born parent) who listed "White" as their ethnicity and "English" as their mother tongue, all 574,997 who listed "White" as their ethnicity and were native-born to native-born parents, and all 7,084 respondents who listed "Negro" as their ethnicity.) German (403,117, or 19.42%), Norwegian (286,884, or 13.82%), Swedish (282,037, or 13.59%), and Polish (49,142, or 2.37%). In 2024, they were English (4,755,417, or 86.86% of the population), Spanish (246,301, or 4.5%), Somali (110,296, or 2.01%), (Note: Speakers of "Amharic, Somali, or other Afro-Asiatic languages".) Hmong (73,033, or 1.33%), and Chinese (23,835, or 0.44%).

In 1910, the most spoken languages in Washington State were English (779,667, or 68.27% of the population), (Note: Sum of all 188,367 respondents "of foreign stock" (either foreign-born or with at least one foreign-born parent) who listed "White" as their ethnicity and "English" as their mother tongue, all 585,242 who listed "White" as their ethnicity and were native-born to native-born parents, and all 6,058 respondents who listed "Negro" as their ethnicity.) German (107,384, or 9.4%), Swedish (61,454, or 5.38%), Norwegian (54,597, or 4.78%), Italian (17,326, or 1.52%), French (17,300, or 1.51%), Danish (16,687, or 1.46%), Japanese (12,920, or 1.13%), (Note: Not enumerated in 1910; number provided is that of respondents identifying their ethnic group as "Japanese".) and Finnish (11,808, or 1.03%). In 2024, they were English (5,858,792, or 77.71% of the population), Spanish (685,031, or 9.09%), Chinese (160,131, or 2.12%), Vietnamese (73,907, or 0.98%), Tagalog (69,772, or 0.93%), Korean (58,590, or 0.78%), Russian (58,539, or 0.78%), and Hindi (45,281, or 0.6%). (Note: excludes 9,651 Urdu speakers, making up 0.13% of the state. Hindi and Urdu are considered mutually intelligible registers of the same language.)

In 1910, the most spoken languages in Texas were English (3,136,343, or 80.49% of the population), (Note: Sum of all 69,810 respondents "of foreign stock" (either foreign-born or with at least one foreign-born parent) who listed "White" as their ethnicity and "English" as their mother tongue, all 2,376,484 who listed "White" as their ethnicity and were native-born to native-born parents, and all 690,049 respondents who listed "Negro" as their ethnicity.) Spanish (234,179, or 6.01%), German (177,430, or 4.55%), and Czech (41,080, or 1.05%). In 2024, they were English (18,861,687, or 64.29% of the population), Spanish (8,272,577, or 28.2%), Vietnamese (254,659, or 0.87%), Chinese (204,912, or 0.7%), Hindi (130,641, or 0.45%), (Note: excludes 108,191 Urdu speakers, making up 0.37% of the state. Hindi and Urdu are considered mutually intelligible registers of the same language.) Arabic (126,371, or 0.43%), and Telugu (126,090, or 0.43%).

In 1910, the most spoken languages in California were English (1,518,070, or 63.85% of the population), (Note: Sum of all 438,283 respondents "of foreign stock" (either foreign-born or with at least one foreign-born parent) who listed "White" as their ethnicity and "English" as their mother tongue, all 1,058,142 who listed "White" as their ethnicity and were native-born to native-born parents, and all 21,645 respondents who listed "Negro" as their ethnicity.) German (249,680, or 10.5%), Italian (117,243, or 4.93%), Spanish (60,652, or 2.55%), Portuguese (58,716, or 2.47%), Swedish (51,630, or 2.17%), French (49,030, or 2.06%), Japanese (41,358, or 1.74%), (Note: Not enumerated in 1910; number provided is that of respondents identifying their ethnic group as "Japanese".) Chinese (36,248, or 1.52%), (Note: Not enumerated in 1910; number provided is that of respondents identifying their ethnic group as "Chinese".) and Danish (31,300, or 1.32%). In 2024, they were English (20,412,952, or 54.66% of the population), Spanish (10,754,818, or 28.8%), Chinese (1,334,399, or 3.57%), Tagalog (820,806, or 2.2%), Vietnamese (559,609, or 1.5%), Korean (350,520, or 0.94%), Persian (263,138, or 0.7%), Hindi (253,073, or 0.68%), (Note: excludes 63,560 Urdu speakers, making up 0.17% of the state. Hindi and Urdu are considered mutually intelligible registers of the same language.) Arabic (223,882, or 0.6%), Armenian (222,071, or 0.59%), Russian (188,555, or 0.5%), Punjabi (186,435, or 0.5%), Japanese (132,602, or 0.36%), French (131,065, or 0.35%), and Portuguese (90,179, or 0.24%).

=== Indigenous languages ===
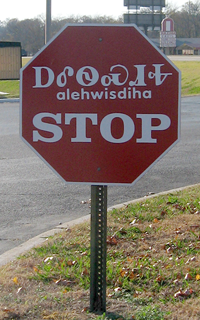
Bilingual stop sign in Tahlequah, Oklahoma, showing both English and the Cherokee syllabary

The history of language in the continental United States began tens of thousands of years ago with the settlement of the Americas by the Paleo-Indians. By 1492, there were roughly 5 million inhabitants of the contiguous U.S., organized into a myriad of tribes and speaking hundreds of different languages. While the Maya, Aztecs, and other Mesoamerican cultures developed writing systems, Indigenous groups in the U.S. had not become literate at this time. They nonetheless utilized a variety of methods to record history, trade, and celestial cycles, such as carved pictographs by the Southwest tribes, images on buffalo hides by Plains Indians, and wampum belts by Eastern Woodlands tribes such as the Haudenosaunee, used to mark oral history, treaties, and other events.

Christopher Columbus' voyage in 1492 led to the European exploration and colonization of the New World. Through introduction of disease, the population of indigenous peoples in the modern-day contiguous U.S. precipitously dropped from around 5 million in 1492 to around 600,000 in 1800, scattered from the Appalachians to the Pacific, while the area east of the Applachians had been largely cleared of indigenous peoples and was home to 4 million European-descended settlers and 1 million African-descended slaves, with the settlers and their slaves undergoing a level of unprecedented population growth., The dramatic population decline and geographic upheaval led to the erasure of numerous Indigenous cultures and consolidation of others. Ultimately this was a significant cause of language extinction.

Between 1800 and 1900, the population of the United States grew rapidly from 5 million to 76 million. The country vigorously expanded westward, continuously displacing native tribes and forcing them to consolidate into a smaller and smaller area, eventually corresponding to the modern state of Oklahoma, which by 1900 was home from tribes as diverse as the Modoc from California, the Sac from Michigan, the Delaware from Pennsylvania, the Seminole from Florida, and the Apache from New Mexico. Even Oklahoma was opened to settlement in the 20th century, leaving only a few scattered reservations throughout the country, by far the largest being the Navajo reservation located on undesired desert land. The closure of most of their lands to farming and grazing, compounded by the ecological destruction that those settlements caused, led the hunter-settler lifestyle of many tribes to become unsustainable, leading to starvation and reliance on the federal government's Indian agencies for food. Starvation, continued introduction of disease, and violence led the Indian population to shrink from 600,000 in 1800 to 250,000 in 1900, and significant language extinction happened during this century. The population of Alaska Natives similarly declined from 70,000 to 25,000 between 1870 and 1910.

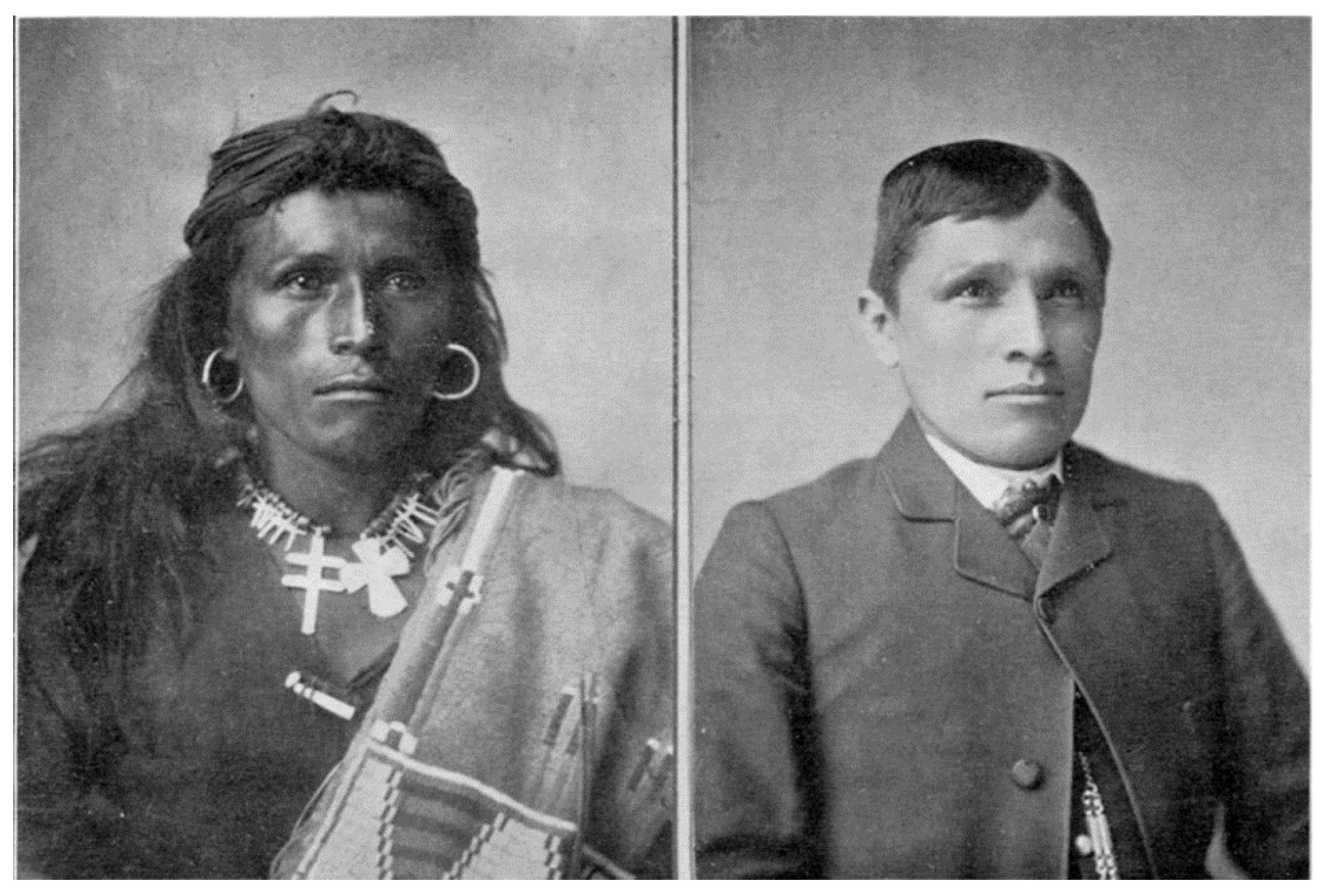
Tom Torlino (of the Navajo Nation) entered the Carlisle Indian Industrial School in October 1882 at age 22 and departed in August 1885. At Carlisle, his Indigenous body paint, clothing, jewelry, and long hair were removed. In such schools, many Indigenous people were also physically punished for speaking their native languages.

After 1900, the U.S. government pursued the cultural assimilation of Native Americans, including the termination and downsizing of reservations, and the enrollment of reservation youth in American Indian boarding schools where they were separated from their families and cultures and forced to speak English, even punished for speaking their home languages.

The purposeful erasure of Indigenous languages in favor of English is considered linguistic imperialism and part of the cultural aspect of the Native American genocide in the United States.

Hawaii was annexed to the United States in 1898. The Native Hawaiian population fell from 683,000 in 1778 to 24,000 by 1920, and came to be outnumbered by White and Asian migrants. Demographic pressures and governmental assimilation policies led to near extinction of the Hawaiian language. Conversely, in American Samoa, annexed by the U.S. after 1899, the vast majority of the population is of Samoan ethnicity, and 87.9% of the population speaks Samoan at home, with only 3.3% of the population speaking English at home.

Puerto Rico, Guam, and the Northern Mariana Islands had been under Spanish colonial rule for centuries prior to the 1898 Spanish–American War, following which all three have been eventually annexed by the U.S. In Puerto Rico, the indigenous languages had long since been displaced by Spanish, which remains the language of 94.3% of Puerto Ricans at home; English is spoken at home by 5.5%. Guam and the Northern Mariana Islands were still predominantly inhabited by the indigenous Chamorro people in 1898; they have since become a minority, outnumbered by European and Asian descendants. Nonetheless, Chamorro is the third-most spoken language in Guam at 17.8% of the population, behind English (43.6%) and Filipino (21.2%); in the Northern Mariana Islands, Chamorro is the second-most spoken language at 24.1% of the population, behind Filipino (32.8%) and ahead of English (17%). The indigenous Tanapag language is on the verge of extinction.

In the U.S. Virgin Islands, which the U.S. purchased from Denmark and annexed in 1917 after Danish voters approved the sale in a referendum, the indigenous languages had long been displaced. English had already emerged as the primary language prior to the islands' annexation.

=== Colonial languages ===
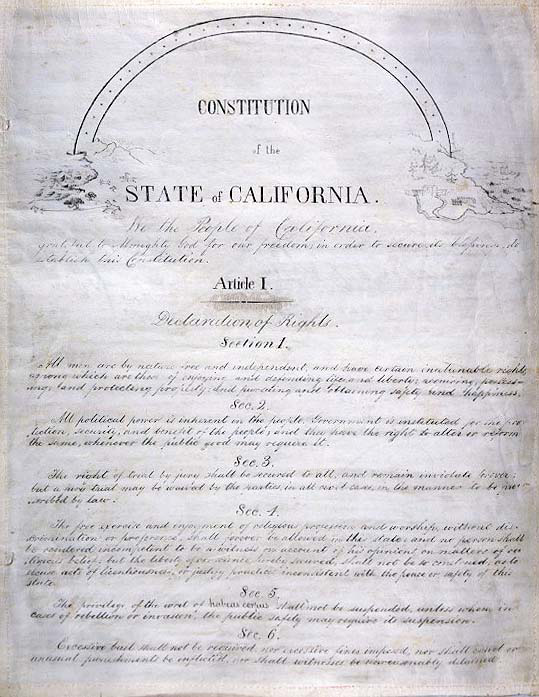
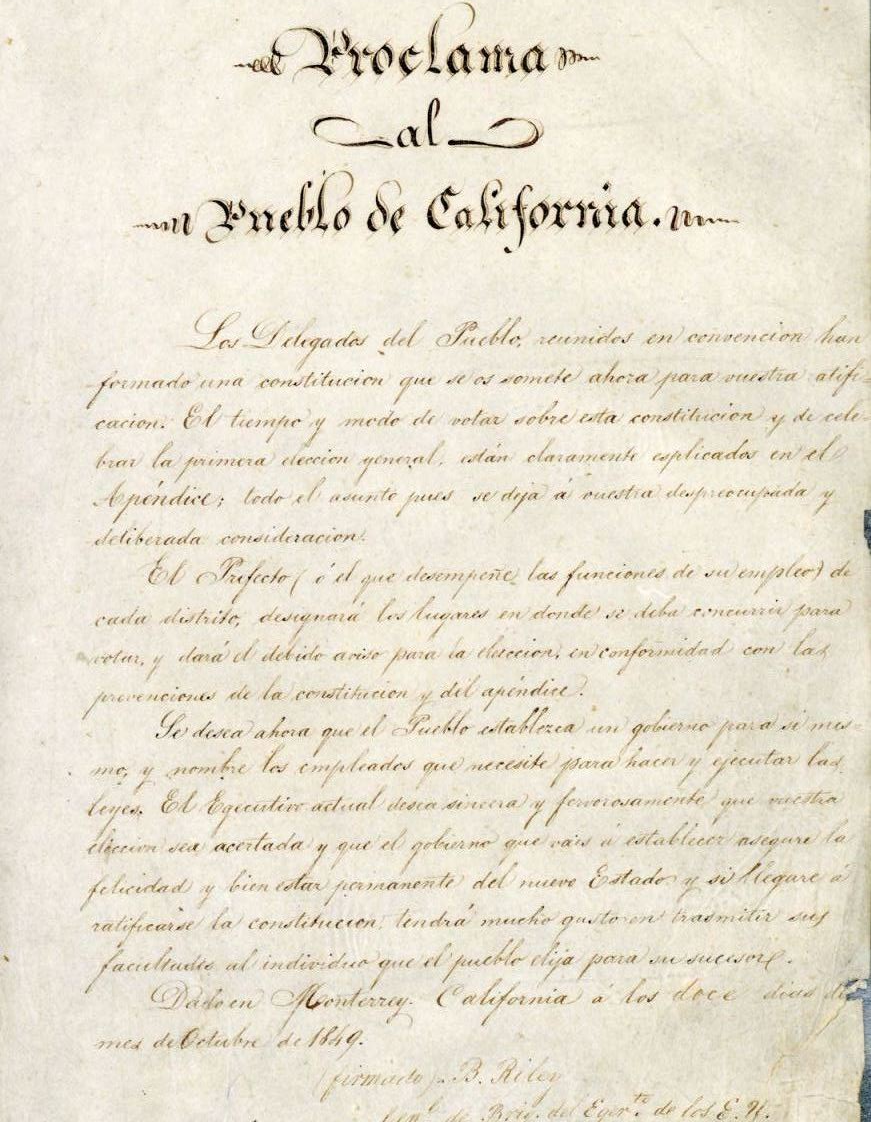
The 1849 Constitution of California was written in both English and Spanish by both American and Californio delegates. The first Constitution protected the rights of Spanish speakers to use their language in government proceedings, mandating that all government documents be published in both English and Spanish. Despite the initial recognition of Spanish by early American governments in California, the revised 1879 state constitution stripped the rights of Spanish speakers and the official status of Spanish. The growth of the English-only movement by the mid-20th century led to the passage of 1986 California Proposition 63, which enshrined English as the only official language in California. However, California's state government has made efforts to expand its Spanish-language capacity across a variety of agencies, and its state courts provide live Spanish-language interpretation in all 52 counties, across all superior courts, courts of appeal, and state supreme court.

Spanish, French, English, Dutch, Swedish, and Russian settlements formed in the modern-day contiguous United States and Alaska after 1492. The English colonies were the most successful and absorbed the rest, while attracting migrants from non-English-speaking lands like Scotland and Germany. The colonies also imported millions of African slaves, who introduced their languages to the Americas. English emerged as the dominant language in the United States, and only tiny enclaves remain from the non-anglophone immigration of the 18th and 19th centuries, including the German-speaking Amish communities of Pennsylvania, the Gullah speakers of coastal Georgia and South Carolina, the Cajun speakers of the francophone "triangle" in Louisiana, and residents of a few isolated Russian-speaking settlements in Alaska.

=== Languages of mass migration (1830–1924) ===
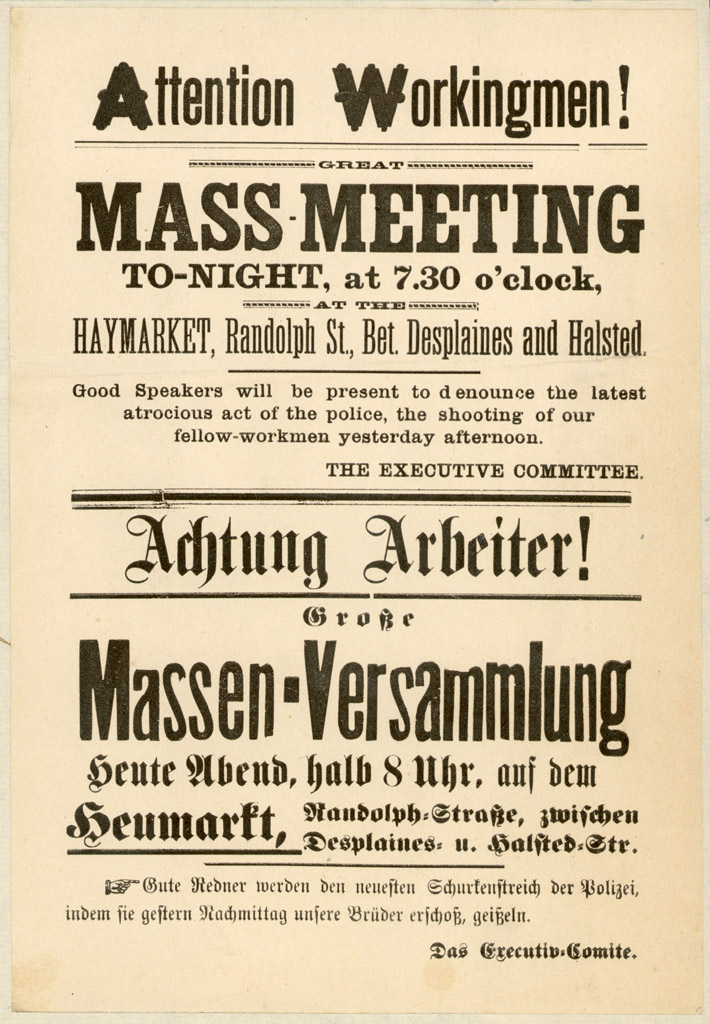
An 1886 flyer, written in both English and German, calls for a labor rally at Haymarket Square in Chicago. European immigrants, who made up much of the U.S. manufacturing workforce during the Gilded Age, introduced many languages.

From 1830 to 1890, there was massive German and Irish migration to the U.S. While both groups settled across the country, Irish settlement was especially pronounced in the East Coast urban centers (Boston, New York, Philadelphia, Baltimore); German settlement, while more well-distributed, was especially pronounced in the Midwest and Texas, both in urban and rural areas.

Starting around mid-century, there were also migration of Swedes, Norwegians, and French Canadians, and Chinese. Swedes and Norwegians were especially concentrated in the Upper Midwest, French Canadians in northern New England, and Chinese in the West.

From 1890 to 1924, there was massive migration of Italians, Yiddish-speaking Jews (mainly from the Pale of Settlement), and Slavs (especially Poles), alongside lesser numbers of other groups from Southern Europe, Eastern Europe, and the Middle East. Italians and Jews were predominantly concentrated in the Northeast urban centers such as New York or Philadelphia, while Slavs were predominantly in the Midwest urban centers such as Chicago or St. Louis. Japanese, Indians, and Koreans also arrived on the West Coast.

By the 1920s, nativist sentiment led to restrictive migration legislation curtailing these inflows and pressure to speak English instead of immigrant languages. Lack of new migrants and assimilationist pressures led to the decline of spoken languages other than English between the 1920s and 1960s. One notable exception was French, with French Canadians preserving their language to a much greater level than other migrant groups to the present day. As a result, the French language did not decline as much as other languages such as German, Norwegian, Swedish, Italian, Polish, Yiddish, Czech, or Slovak. While other immigrant groups were in decline at this time, Mexicans and Filipinos migrated to the West while Puerto Ricans migrated to New York and Philadelphia.

=== Languages of modern migration (1965–present) ===
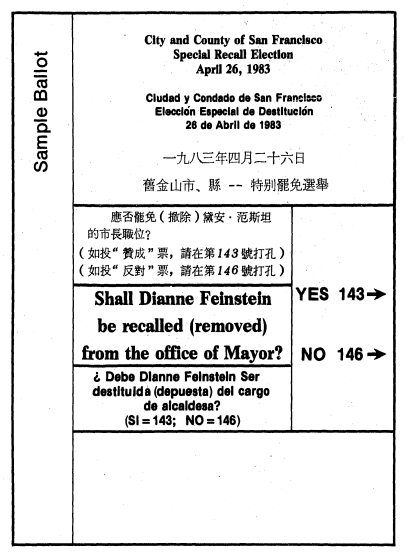
Ballots for a 1983 election in San Francisco, California, were printed in Spanish and Chinese in addition to English, reflecting increasing multilingualism in the country due to immigration from Latin America and Asia.

With the relaxation of immigration laws following the Immigration and Nationality Act of 1965, there has been a surge in immigration to the United States, predominantly from nations of a lower income level in Latin America, East and South Asia, the Middle East, Eastern Europe, and sub-Saharan Africa. These immigrants have introduced new languages into the United States—and faced the pressure to assimilate and to speak English. Simultaneously, European languages other than English have continued to decline since the heyday of European migration.

== Most common languages ==
Based on annual data from the American Community Survey (ACS), the U.S. Census Bureau regularly publishes information on the most common languages spoken at home. It also reports on the English-speaking ability of people who speak a language other than English at home. In 2023, Spanish speakers made up about three-fifths of all speakers of languages other than English in the United States. In 2017, the U.S. Census Bureau published information on the number of speakers of some 350 languages as surveyed by the ACS from 2009 to 2013, but it does not regularly tabulate and report data for that many languages.

The most spoken languages at home in the United States in 2020:

1. English (only language spoken in the household) – 245.69 million
2. Spanish – 42.03 million
3. Chinese (including Mandarin, Cantonese, Hokkien and all other varieties) – 3.40 million
4. Tagalog (including Filipino) – 1.71 million
5. Vietnamese – 1.52 million
6. Arabic – 1.39 million
7. French – 1.18 million
8. Korean – 1.07 million
9. Russian – 1.04 million
10. Portuguese – 937,000
11. Haitian Creole – 895,000
12. Hindi – 865,000
13. German – 857,000
14. other Indo-European languages – 662,000
15. Yoruba, Twi, Igbo and other languages of West Africa – 640,000
16. Amharic, Somali, and other Afro-Asiatic languages – 596,000
17. Dutch, Afrikaans, Frisian, Luxembourgish, Scots, Yiddish, Pennsylvania Dutch, Low German, and other West Germanic languages – 574,000
18. Polish – 533,000
19. Italian – 513,000
20. Urdu – 508,000
21. Ilocano, Samoan, Hawaiian, and other Austronesian languages – 486,000
22. Persian (including Farsi, Dari and Tajik) – 472,000
23. Telugu – 460,000
24. Other languages of Asia – 460,000
25. Japanese – 455,000
26. Nepali, Marathi, and other Indic languages – 448,000
27. Gujarati – 437,000
28. Bengali – 403,000
29. Ukrainian and other Slavic languages – 385,000
30. Tamil – 341,000
31. other and unspecified languages – 327,000
32. Punjabi – 319,000
33. Swahili and other languages of Central, Eastern, and Southern Africa – 288,000
34. Thais (including Central Thai and Lao) – 284,000
35. Malayalam, Kannada, and other Dravidian languages – 280,000
36. Serbo-Croatian (including Bosnian, Croatian, Montenegrin, and Serbian) – 266,000
37. Armenian – 256,000
38. Greek – 253,000
39. Hmong – 240,000
40. Hebrew – 215,000
41. Khmer – 193,000
42. Other Native languages of North America – 169,000
43. Navajo – 155,000

The ACS is not a full census but an annual sample-based survey conducted by the U.S. Census Bureau. The language statistics are based on responses to a three-part question asked about all members of a target U.S. household who are at least five years old. The first part asks if they "speak a language other than English at home." If so, the head of the household or main respondent is asked to report which language each member speaks in the home, and how well each individual speaks English. It does not ask how well individuals speak any other language of the household. Thus, some respondents might have only limited speaking ability in those languages. In addition, it is difficult to make historical comparisons of the numbers of speakers because language questions used by the U.S. Census changed numerous times before 1980.

The ACS does not tabulate the number of people who report the use of American Sign Language at home, so such data must come from other sources. While modern estimates indicate that American Sign Language was signed by as many as 500,000 Americans in 1972 (the last official survey of sign language), estimates as recently as 2011 were closer to 100,000. Various cultural factors, such as the passage of the Americans with Disabilities Act, have resulted in far greater educational opportunities for hearing-impaired children, which could double or triple the number of current users of American Sign Language.

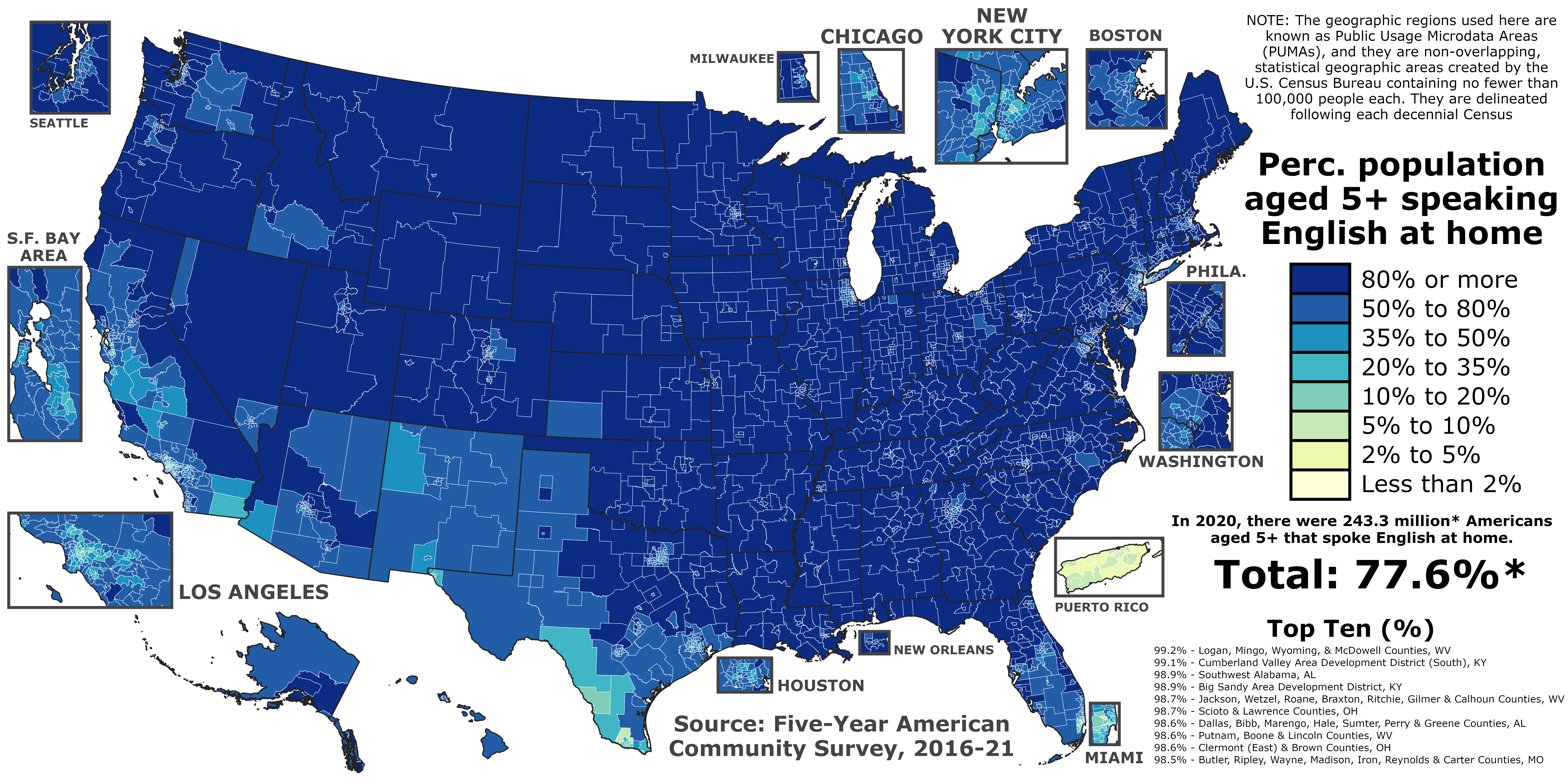
Percentage of Americans aged five and older who speak English at home in each Public Usage Microdata Area of the 50 states, the District of Columbia, and Puerto Rico (2016–2021 five-year American Community Survey)

English is the most common language spoken in U.S. homes, with approximately 248 million speakers as well as numerous bilingual speakers. Spanish is spoken by approximately 45 million people. The United States has the world's fourth largest Spanish-speaking population, outnumbered only by Mexico, Colombia, and Argentina; other estimates put the United States at over 50 million, second only to Mexico. Throughout the Southwestern United States and Puerto Rico, long-established Spanish-speaking communities coexist with large numbers of more recent Hispanophone immigrants. Although many new Latin American immigrants are less than fluent in English, nearly all second-generation Hispanic and Latino Americans speak English fluently, while only about half still speak Spanish.

According to the 2000 U.S. census, people of German ancestry made up the largest single ethnic group in the United States, but German language was the fourth most-spoken language in the country. Italian, Polish, and French are still widely spoken among populations descending from immigrants from those countries in the early 20th century, but the use of these languages is dwindling as the older generations die. Russian is also spoken by immigrant populations.

Tagalog and Vietnamese have over one million speakers each in the United States, almost entirely within recent immigrant populations. Both languages, along with the varieties of Chinese (mostly Cantonese, Taishanese, and Standard Mandarin), Japanese, and Korean, are now used in elections in Alaska, California, Hawaii, Illinois, New York, Texas, and Washington.

Sign on a train in San Francisco in the 4 most spoken languages: English, Spanish, Chinese, and Tagalog

Native American languages are spoken in smaller pockets of the country, but these populations are decreasing, and the languages are seldom widely used outside of reservations. Besides English, Spanish, French, German, Navajo and other Native American languages, all other languages are usually learned from immigrant ancestors that came after the time of independence or learned through some form of education.

American Sign Language is the most common sign language in the United States, although there are unrelated sign languages that have also been developed in the States and territories—mostly in the Pacific. No concrete numbers exist for signers but something upwards of 250,000 is common. The most widely taught foreign languages in the United States, in terms of enrollment numbers from kindergarten through university undergraduate education, are Spanish, French, and German. Other commonly taught languages include Latin, Japanese, American Sign Language, Italian, and Chinese.

== Official languages ==
Map of U.S. official language status by state. English declared the official language Multiple official languages (Alaska, Hawaii, South Dakota) or languages with special status (New Mexico), all including English. No official language specified.

English is typically used by the federal government and is considered the national language. In 2025, Donald Trump issued Executive Order 14224, declaring English the official language of the United States, and federal agencies recognize English as official under the order. However, the U.S. has never had a de jure official language, as Congress has never passed legislation to designate one at the federal level. (Note: The most recent attempt to do so, the Inhofe Amendment (2006), would have declared English the "national language"; it passed overwhelmingly in the U.S. Senate but failed to win enough votes in the U.S. House of Representatives to become federal law.)

Outside of Puerto Rico, English is the primary language used for legislation, regulations, executive orders, treaties, federal court rulings, and all other official pronouncements. Nonetheless, laws require some documents, such as ballots, to be printed in both English and one or more other languages if there are large numbers of non-English speakers in an area. Proceedings of the United States District Court for the District of Puerto Rico are required by federal law to be in English, despite the predominantly Spanish-speaking population and the status of Spanish as an official language of the territorial government.

Thirty-two of the 50 states have adopted legislation granting official or co-official status to English, in some cases as part of what has been called the English-only movement. Typically only "English" is specified, not a particular variety like American English. As an exception, from 1923 to 1969, the state of Illinois recognized its official language as "American", before it was replaced by English. English is typically used in states that do not have an official language.

Hawaiian and English are the official languages of Hawaii, reflecting the Hawaiian Kingdom's history of trade and diplomacy with Britain in the decades prior to its annexation by the United States in 1898. In 2014, Alaska made 20 Alaska Native languages official alongside English; in 2024, that was expanded further to 23, making 24 total official languages. Alaska provides voting information in Iñupiaq, Central Yup'ik, Gwich'in, Siberian Yupik, and Koyukon among others. On July 1, 2019, a law in South Dakota went into effect, making Sioux the "official indigenous language", alongside the "common language", English. The law describes Sioux as the language of the O'ceti Sakowin, Seven Council Fires, which is also known by treaty as the Great Sioux Nation. It says Sioux comprises three dialects: Lakota, Dakota, and Nakota.

French is a de facto, but unofficial, language in Maine and Louisiana, and, since 1848, law in New Mexico, a state with many Spanish speakers and a unique dialect, has granted Spanish speakers in the state the right to receive many services in Spanish. Although the state constitution does not specify an official language, laws are published in English and Spanish, and government materials and services are legally required (by Act) to be made accessible to speakers of both languages as well as Navajo and various Pueblo languages. The government of Louisiana offers services and most documents in both English and French, and New Mexico does so in English and Spanish. New Mexico is also one of four states to have passed an "English Plus" resolution, supporting proficiency in English and other languages, alongside Oregon, Rhode Island, and Washington.

English is at least one of the official languages in all five permanently inhabited U.S. territories. In Puerto Rico, both English and Spanish are official, although Spanish has been declared the principal official language. The school system and the government operate almost entirely in Spanish, but federal law requires the United States District Court for the District of Puerto Rico to use English, like the rest of the federal court system.

Guam recognizes English and Chamorro. In the U.S. Virgin Islands, English is the only official language. In American Samoa, both English and Samoan are officially recognized; English is common, but Samoan is also seen in some official communications. In the Northern Mariana Islands, English, Chamorro, and Carolinian are official.

Algonquian, Cherokee, and Sioux are among many Native American languages which are official or co-official on many U.S. Indian reservations and pueblos. In Oklahoma before statehood in 1907, territory officials debated whether or not to have the Cherokee, Choctaw, and Muscogee languages as co-official, but the idea never gained ground. Cherokee is officially recognized by the Cherokee Nation within the Cherokee tribal jurisdiction area in eastern Oklahoma.

After New Amsterdam (formerly a Dutch colony) was transferred to English administration (becoming the Province of New York) in the late 17th century, English supplanted Dutch as the official language. However, "Dutch remained the primary language for many civil and ecclesiastical functions and most private affairs for the next century." The Jersey Dutch dialect is now extinct.

California has agreed to allow the publication of state documents in other languages to represent minority groups and immigrant communities. Languages such as Spanish, Chinese, Korean, Tagalog, Persian, Russian, Vietnamese, and Thai appear in official state documents, and the Department of Motor Vehicles publishes in nine languages.

The issue of multilingualism also applies in the states of Arizona and Texas. While the constitution of Texas has no official language policy, Arizona passed a proposition in 2006 declaring English as the official language. Nonetheless, Arizona law requires the distribution of voting ballots in Spanish, as well as indigenous languages such as Navajo, O'odham and Hopi, in counties where they are spoken.

A popular urban legend, known as the Muhlenberg legend, claims that German was almost made an official language of the United States but lost by one vote. In reality, it was a request by a group of German immigrants to have an official translation of laws into German. House speaker Frederick Muhlenberg has since become associated with the legend.

Place	English official	Other official language(s)	Note
Alabama	Yes	None	since 1990
Alaska	Yes	Inupiaq, Siberian Yupik, Central Alaskan Yup'ik, Alutiiq, Unangax, Dena'ina, Deg Xinag, Holikachuk, Koyukon, Upper Kuskokwim, Gwich'in, Lower Tanana, Middle Tanana, Upper Tanana, Tanacross, Hän, Ahtna, Eyak, Tlingit, Haida, Cup’ig, Wetal, Tsimshian	since 2015
Arizona	Yes	None	since 2006, 1988 law ruled unconstitutional
Arkansas	Yes	None	since 1987
California	Yes	None	since 1986 with Proposition 63. Proposition 63 is unenforceable due to the lack of appropriate legislation, and the Bilingual Services Act provides for the use of other languages in public outreach.
Colorado	Yes	None	since 1988; from 1876–1990 the Colorado Constitution required laws to be published in English, Spanish, and German
Connecticut	No	None	
Delaware	No	None	
Florida	Yes	None	since 1988
Georgia	Yes	None	since 1996
Hawaii	Yes	Hawaiian	since 1978
Idaho	Yes	None	since 2007
Illinois	Yes	None	since 1969; "American" was the official language 1923–1969.
Indiana	Yes	None	since 1984
Iowa	Yes	None	since 2002
Kansas	Yes	None	since 2007
Kentucky	Yes	None	since 1984
Louisiana	No	None	French has had special status since 1968 founding of CODOFIL.
Maine	No	None	
Maryland	No	None	
Massachusetts	Yes	None	A 1975 state supreme court case, Commonwealth v. Olivo, underscored official status of English; in 2002, English was declared the "common public language."
Michigan	No	None	
Minnesota	No	None	
Mississippi	Yes	None	since 1987
Missouri	Yes	None	since 1998; state constitution amended accordingly in 2008
Montana	Yes	None	since 1995
Nebraska	Yes	None	since 1920
Nevada	No	None	
New Hampshire	Yes	None	since 1995
New Jersey	No	None	
New Mexico	No	None	Spanish has had special recognition since 1912 passage of state constitution. See article. English Plus since 1989
New York	No	None	
North Carolina	Yes	None	since 1987
North Dakota	Yes	None	since 1987
Ohio	No	None	
Oklahoma	Yes	None	since 2010. The Choctaw language is official within the Choctaw Nation; the Cherokee language has been official among the Cherokee and the UKB since 1991.
Oregon	No	None	English Plus since 1989
Pennsylvania	No	None	
Rhode Island	No	None	English Plus since 1992
South Carolina	Yes	None	since 1987
South Dakota	Yes	Sioux	since 1995, since 2019
Tennessee	Yes	None	since 1984
Texas	No	None	
Utah	Yes	None	English only from 2000–2021; since 2021, the Utah code has been amended to be English official but not English only.
Vermont	No	None	
Virginia	Yes	None	since 1996
Washington	No	None	English Plus since 1989
West Virginia	Yes	None	since 2016
Wisconsin	No	None	
Wyoming	Yes	None	since 1996
District of Columbia	No	None	The Language Access Act of 2004 guarantees equal access and participation in public services, programs, and activities for residents of the District of Columbia who cannot (or have limited capacity to) speak, read, or write English. Speakers of Amharic, French, Chinese, Spanish, Vietnamese and Korean receive additional accommodations.
American Samoa	Yes	Samoan	
Guam	Yes	Chamorro	
Northern Mariana Islands	Yes	Chamorro, Carolinian	
Puerto Rico	Yes	Spanish	
U.S. Virgin Islands	Yes	None	

=== Education ===
Bilingual education in the United States, often a different concept from language immersion or dual-language school programs, is an area of political controversy. In standard bilingual classes, the non-English language (typically Spanish or Chinese) is utilized over a period of time when students' English-language proficiency is lacking. Otherwise the medium of instruction at almost all U.S. schools, at all levels, is English. The exceptions are in language classes such as French or German, or in general education in the territory of Puerto Rico, where Spanish is standard. English is the language of instruction in the territory of American Samoa, despite most students speaking Samoan as their native language.

There are also hundreds of language immersion and dual-language schools across the United States that teach in a variety of languages, including Spanish, Hawaiian, Chamorro, French, and Mandarin Chinese (for example, the Mandarin Immersion Magnet School in Houston, Texas). However, English is a mandatory class in all these schools.

== Historic languages ==
Main languages spoken at home in the United States
Language	percent
English	77.5%
Spanish	13.7%
Other Indo-European	3.9%
Asian and Pacific island	3.6%
Other	1.3%

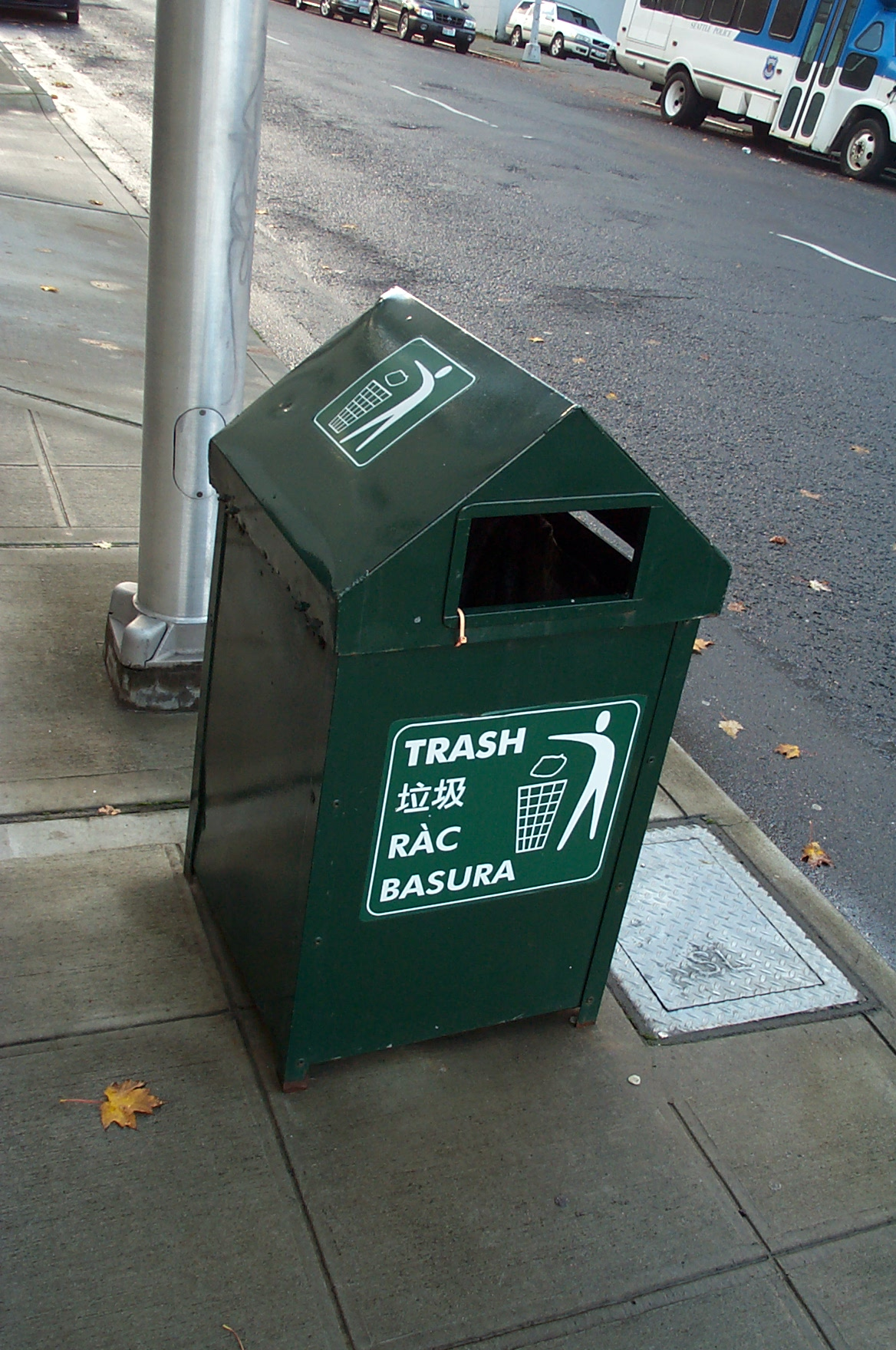
A trash can in Seattle labeled in four languages: English, Chinese, Vietnamese (written as "ràc" instead of "rác"), and Spanish. Basura also exists as a loanword in Tagalog, spoken in the city.

Some of the first European languages to be spoken in the U.S. were English, Dutch, French, Spanish, and Swedish.

From the mid-19th century, the nation had large numbers of immigrants who spoke little or no English. The laws, constitutions, and legislative proceedings of some states and territories appeared in the languages of politically important immigrant groups. There have been bilingual schools and local newspapers in such languages as German, Ukrainian, Hungarian, Irish, Italian, Norwegian, Greek, Polish, Swedish, Romanian, Czech, Japanese, Yiddish, Hebrew, Lithuanian, Welsh, Cantonese, Bulgarian, Dutch, Portuguese, Persian, Arabic and others. These flourished despite English-only laws in some jurisdictions prohibiting church services, telephone conversations, and even conversations in the street or on railway platforms in a language other than English, up until the first of these laws was ruled unconstitutional in 1923 (Meyer v. Nebraska).

Typically, immigrant languages tend to be lost through assimilation within two or three generations.

Several states and territories have native populations who spoke their own language prior to joining the United States, and have maintained their original languages for centuries. The languages include Alaskan Russian, Louisiana French, New Mexican Spanish, Pennsylvania Dutch, and Puerto Rican Spanish.

=== English (245.69 million speakers) ===
Distribution of English-speaking households in the United States in 2000.

English was inherited from British colonization, and it is spoken by the majority of the population. English has become increasingly common; when the United States was founded, just 40% of Americans spoke English.. In 2002, around 87% of Americans spoke English as their first language. It serves as the de facto national language, the language in which government business is carried out. According to the American Community Survey (ACS) of the U.S. Census Bureau, 77% of U.S. residents aged five and older spoke only English at home in 2026, and all but approximately 8.6% of U.S. residents speak English "very well".

American English is different from British English in terms of spelling, pronunciation, and certain vocabulary and slang usage. The differences are, however, rarely a barrier to effective communication between speakers of American English and British English.

Some states, like California, have amended their constitutions to declare English the only official language. In practice, this means that official government documents must at least be available in English; it does not mandate that they be printed exclusively in English. For example, the standard California Class C driver's license examination can be taken in 32 different languages, including English, Spanish, Korean, Chinese, and Farsi (Persian).

=== Spanish (42.03 million speakers) ===
Spanish language distribution in the United States.

Spanish was also inherited from colonization and is sanctioned as official in the commonwealth of Puerto Rico, where it is the general language of instruction in schools and universities. In the 50 states, the District of Columbia, and all territories except Puerto Rico, Spanish is taught as a foreign or second language but is not a required subject. Spanish is spoken at home in areas with large Hispanic populations: the Southwestern United States along the border with Mexico, as well as in Florida, parts of California, the District of Columbia, Illinois, New Jersey, and New York. In Hispanic communities across the country, bilingual signs in both Spanish and English may be quite common. Furthermore, numerous neighborhoods exist (such as Washington Heights in New York City or Little Havana in Miami) in which entire city blocks will have only Spanish-language signs and Spanish-speaking people.

Spanish speakers in the United States
Year	Number of Spanish speakers	Percent of U.S. population
1980	11 million	5%
1990	17.3 million	7%
2000	28.1 million	10%
2010	37 million	13%
2020	41.3 million	13.7%
2024	44.9 million	13.9%

Younger generations of non-Hispanics in the United States choose to study Spanish as a foreign or second language in far greater numbers than other second-language options. This might be due in part to the growing Hispanic population and the increasing popularity of Latin American movies and music performed in the Spanish language. A 2009 American Community Survey (ACS) conducted by the United States Census Bureau, showed that Spanish was spoken at home by over 35 million people aged 5 or older, making the United States the world's fifth-largest Spanish-speaking community, outnumbered only by Mexico, Colombia, Spain, and Argentina. Since then, the number of persons reported on the ACS to speak Spanish at home has increased (see table).

==== New Mexican Spanish ====
The State of New Mexico.

In northern New Mexico and southern Colorado, Spanish speakers have been isolated for centuries in the southern Rockies, and developed a distinct dialect of Spanish spoken nowhere else: New Mexican Spanish. The dialect features a mix of Castilian, Galician and, more recently, Mexican Spanish, as well as Pueblo loan words. New Mexican Spanish also contains a large proportion of English loan words, particularly for technological words (e.g. bos, troca, and telefón).

Speakers of New Mexican Spanish are mainly descendants of Spanish colonists who arrived in New Mexico in the sixteenth through the eighteenth centuries. During this time, contact with the rest of Spanish America was limited, and New Mexican Spanish developed on its own course. In the meantime, Spanish colonists coexisted with and intermarried with Puebloan peoples and Navajos. After the Mexican–American War, New Mexico and all its inhabitants came under the governance of the English-speaking United States, and for the next hundred years, English-speakers increased in number.

==== Puerto Rican Spanish ====
The Commonwealth of Puerto Rico.

Puerto Rican Spanish is the main language and dialect of the people of Puerto Rico, as well as many people descended from Puerto Ricans elsewhere throughout the United States.

==== Spanglish ====
Spanglish is a code-switching variant of Spanish and English and is spoken in areas with large bilingual populations of Spanish and English speakers, such as along the Mexico–United States border (California, Arizona, New Mexico, and Texas), Florida, and New York City.

=== Chinese (3.4 million speakers) ===
The population of Chinese speakers in the United States was increasing rapidly in the 20th century because the number of Chinese immigrants has increased at a rate of more than 50% since 1940. Some 2.8 million Americans speak some variety of Chinese, which combined are counted by the federal census as the third most-spoken language in the country. Until the late 20th century, Yue dialects, including Cantonese and Taishanese, were the most common dialects among immigrants and the descendants of immigrants, especially in California. Since the opening of the People's Republic of China, Mandarin, the official language in the PRC and Republic of China (Taiwan), has become increasingly prevalent. Many Americans of all ethnic backgrounds are also learning Mandarin and, to a far lesser extent, Cantonese.

In New York City in 2002, Mandarin was spoken as a native language among only 10% of Chinese speakers but was predicted to replace Cantonese as the lingua franca among Chinese speakers.

Chinese-Americans in the California Gold Rush and their descendants spoke a variety of the Cantonese language influenced by American English and American societal concepts foreign to Cantonese speakers in Modern China, either through direct English translations such as "Alpine" borrowed from (Alpine County, California), or neologisms such as "Yellow Eagle" (Gold dollar), "Emancipated Woman" (Feminist), and "Telephone". It also maintains older Qing Dynasty Cantonese vocabulary that has fallen out of use in Cantonese spoken in Modern China.

=== French (1.18 million speakers; 2.07 million including Haitian Creole) ===
French language distribution in the United States.

French is the seventh most spoken language in the United States according to the 2020 ACS. It is the fourth most common if Haitian Creole (a French-based dialect that is not mutually intelligible with standard French) is combined and counted as French. The ACS lists Haitian Creole separately from French, which encompasses standard French, Louisiana Creole, and Louisiana Cajun varieties. In the United States, French is spoken mainly by the Louisiana Creole, native French, Cajun, and French-Canadian populations, along with more recent immigrants from Haiti. It is widely spoken in Maine, New Hampshire, Vermont, and in Louisiana, with notable Francophone enclaves in St. Clair County, Michigan, many rural areas of the Upper Peninsula of Michigan and the northern San Francisco Bay area. Because of its legacy in Louisiana, that state is served by the Council for the Development of French in Louisiana (CODOFIL), the only state agency in the United States whose mission is to serve a linguistic population. In October 2018, Louisiana became the first U.S. state to join the Organisation Internationale de la Francophonie.

Three varieties of French developed within what is now the United States in colonial times including Louisiana French, Missouri French, and New England French (essentially a variant of Canadian French). French is the second-most-spoken language in the states of Louisiana and Maine. The largest French-speaking communities in the United States reside in Northeast Maine; Hollywood and Miami, Florida; New York City; certain areas of rural Louisiana; and small minorities in Vermont and New Hampshire. Many of the New England communities are connected to the dialect found across the border in Quebec or New Brunswick. More than 13 million Americans possess primary French heritage, but only 2 million speak French, regional French creoles, or other varieties of the language at home. The largest concentration of French speakers in the country is in Louisiana.

==== Louisiana French ====
Cajun language distribution in the United States.

Louisiana French (Cajun French: français de la Louisiane; Louisiana Creole: françé la lwizyàn) is an umbrella term for the dialects and varieties of the French language spoken traditionally in colonial Lower Louisiana. As of today Louisiana French is primarily used in the U.S. state of Louisiana, specifically in the southern parishes.

French is spoken across ethnic and racial lines by Louisiana French people who may identify as Cajuns or Creoles as well as Chitimacha, Houma, Biloxi, Tunica, Choctaw, Acadians, and French Indian among others. For these reasons, as well as the relatively small influence Acadian French has had on the region, the label Louisiana French or Louisiana Regional French (French: français régional louisianais) is generally regarded as more accurate and inclusive than "Cajun French" and is the preferred term by linguists and anthropologists. However, "Cajun French" is commonly used in lay discourse by speakers of the language and other inhabitants of Louisiana.

=== German (857,000 speakers; 1.29 million including Yiddish and Pennsylvania German dialects) ===
German American states.

German was the 13th most common language spoken at home, according to the 2020 ACS survey. If German-related dialects such as Yiddish and varieties such as Pennsylvania German (Amish) are included, German ranks among the top ten languages spoken in U.S. homes. (The ACS lists both Yiddish and Pennsylvania German separately from German.) By the 18th century, German was a widely spoken language in some American colonies, especially Pennsylvania, where a number of German-speaking Protestants and other religious minorities settled to escape persecution in Europe. Another wave of settlement occurred when Germans fleeing the failure of 19th-century German revolutions immigrated to the United States. Throughout the century, a large number of these immigrants settled in urban areas, where entire neighborhoods were German-speaking and numerous local German-language newspapers and periodicals were established. Germans also took up farming around the country, including the Texas Hill Country, at this time. The language was widely spoken until the United States entered World War I.

In the early 20th century, German was the most widely studied foreign language in the United States, and prior to World War I, more than 6% of American schoolchildren received their primary education exclusively in German, though some of these Germans came from areas outside Germany. Currently, more than 49 million Americans claim German ancestry, the largest self-described ethnic group in the U.S., but less than 4% of them speak a language other than English at home, according to recent American Community Surveys. The Amish, concentrated in the State of Pennsylvania, speak a dialect of German known as Pennsylvania Dutch; it is widely spoken in Amish communities today.

Waves of colonial Palatines from the Rhenish Palatinate, one of the Holy Roman states, settled in the Province of New York and the Province of Pennsylvania. The first Palatines arrived in the late 1600s but the majority came throughout the 1700s; they were known collectively as the Palatine Dutch. The Pennsylvania Dutch settled other states, including Indiana and Ohio. For many years, the term "Palatine" meant German American.

There is a myth (known as the Muhlenberg legend) that German was to be the official language of the U.S., but this is inaccurate and based on a failed early attempt to have government documents translated into German. The myth also extends to German being the second official language of Pennsylvania; however, Pennsylvania has no official language. Although more than 41 million Americans claim to have German ancestors, only 857,000 Americans spoke German at home in 2020.

==== Pennsylvania Dutch ====
Pennsylvania Dutch areas of the United States

Pennsylvania Dutch or Pennsylvania German is a dialect of Palatine German that is traditionally spoken by the Pennsylvania Dutch, and has settled the Midwest, in places such as Ohio, Indiana, Iowa and other states, where many of the speakers live today. It evolved from the German dialect of the Palatinate brought over to America by Palatines from the Holy Roman Empire in the 1600s. They settled on land sold to them by William Penn. Germantown included not only Mennonites, but also Quakers. The Pennsylvania Dutch speak Pennsylvania Dutch, and adhere to different Christian denominations: Lutherans, German Reformed, Mennonites, Amish, German Baptist Brethren, Roman Catholics; today Pennsylvania Dutch is mainly spoken by Old Order Amish and Old Order Mennonites.

==== Texas German ====
The State of Texas

Texas German is a group of High German dialects spoken by Texas Germans, descendants of German immigrants who settled in Texas in the mid-19th century.

==== Yiddish ====
Yiddish, a West Germanic language historically spoken by Ashkenazi Jews in Central and eastern Europe, has a much longer history in the United States than Hebrew. It has been present since at least the late 19th century and continues to have roughly 148,000 speakers as of the 2009 American Community Survey. Though they came from varying geographic backgrounds and nuanced approaches to worship, immigrant Jews of Central Europe, Germany and Russia were often united under a common understanding of the Yiddish language once they settled in America. By the early 20th century, dozens of publications in the language were available in most East Coast cities. Though the use of Yiddish has declined by quite a bit since the end of World War II, it has by no means disappeared. Many Israeli immigrants and expatriates have at least some understanding of the language in addition to Hebrew, and many of the descendants of the great migration of Ashkenazi Jews of the past century pepper their English vocabulary with Yiddish loan words. Yiddish remains the lingua franca among American Haredi Jews (particularly Hasidic Jewry), whose communities are concentrated in Los Angeles, Miami, New York City, and the suburbs of New York. A significant diffusion of Yiddish loan words into the non-Jewish population continues to be a distinguishing feature of New York City English. Some of these words include glitch, chutzpah, mensch, kvetch, klutz, etc.

=== Russian (1.04 million speakers) ===
In the United States, the Russian language is spoken mostly in urban areas of the states of New York, California, Washington, New Jersey, Illinois, Massachusetts, and Pennsylvania. It is also spoken in isolated areas of Alaska originally settled in the 18th and 19th centuries by Russian promyshlenniki; these were largely Siberian fur hunters, river merchants, and mercenaries who later worked as sailors, carpenters, artisans, and craftsmen. In the 21st century, Russian is especially spoken in immigrant neighborhoods of larger U.S. cities: New York City, Boston, Los Angeles, San Francisco, Philadelphia, Chicago, Seattle, Sacramento, Spokane, Miami, Portland, Oregon, and two Portland suburbs, Vancouver, Washington and Woodburn, Oregon.

From 1799 until 1867, the Russian-American Company owned most all of what became Alaska Territory. This changed with the formal sale of Alaska to the United States on March 30, 1867, after the final resolution of the Crimean War. The presence of Russian speakers in the United States has always been limited in numbers, and even more so after the assassination of the Romanov dynasty of tsars. However, beginning in the late 1970s and continuing until the mid-1990s, many Russian-speaking Jews from the Soviet Union (and later from its independent constituent republics of Russia, Moldova, Ukraine, Belarus, and Uzbekistan) have immigrated to the United States, increasing the use of Russian in the country.

The largest Russian-speaking neighborhoods in the United States are found in New York City (specifically the Brighton Beach area of Brooklyn, Forest Hills and Rego Park in Queens, and parts of Staten Island), Los Angeles (especially West Los Angeles and West Hollywood), neighborhoods of Philadelphia (notably the Far Northeast), and parts of Miami (Sunny Isles Beach).

The Russian-language media group Slavic Voice of America, based in Dallas, Texas, serves Russian-speaking Americans.

==== Alaskan Russian ====
The State of Alaska

Alaskan Russian, known locally as Old Russian, is a dialect of Russian influenced by the Alutiiq language spoken by Alaskan Creoles. Most of its speakers live on Kodiak Island and in the Ninilchik (Kenai Peninsula). It has been isolated from other varieties of Russian for over a century.

Kodiak Russian was natively spoken along the Afognak Strait until the Great Alaskan earthquake and tsunami of 1964. It has become moribund, spoken by only a handful of elderly people, and is virtually undocumented.

Ninilchik Russian has been better studied and is more vibrant. It developed from the Russian colonial settlement of the village of Ninilchik in 1847.

Ninilchik Russian vocabulary is clearly Russian, with a few borrowings from English and Alaskan native languages.

In Nikolaevsk, Alaska, 66.57% of the population still spoke Russian at home as late as 2017.

=== Dutch (142,000 speakers) ===
Distribution of U.S. households that speak Dutch at home in 2000

In a 1990 demographic consensus, 3% of surveyed citizens claimed to be of Dutch descent. Modern estimates place the Dutch American population (with total or partial Dutch heritage) at 3.1 million, or 0.93%, lagging just a bit behind Norwegian Americans and Swedish Americans, while 885,000 Americans claimed total Dutch heritage.

An estimated 141,580 people, or 0.0486%, in the United States still speak the Dutch language, including its Flemish variant, at home as of 2013. This is in addition to the 23,010 and 510 speakers, respectively, of the Afrikaans and West-Frisian languages, both closely related to Dutch. Dutch speakers in the U.S. are concentrated mainly in California (23,500), Florida (10,900), Pennsylvania (9,900), Ohio (9,600), New York (8,700) and Michigan (6,600, residing almost entirely in the city of Holland). In 2021, 95.3% of the total Dutch-American population aged 5 years and over spoke only English at home.

==== Low Dutch ====
There has been a Dutch presence in North America since establishment of 17th-century colony of New Netherland (parts of New York, New Jersey and Delaware), where Dutch was spoken by the New Netherlander, the original settlers, and their descendants. It was still spoken in the region at the time of the American Revolution and thereafter. For example, Alexander Hamilton's wife, Eliza Hamilton, attended a Dutch-language church during their marriage. African-American abolitionist and women's rights activist Sojourner Truth (born "Isabella Baumfree") was a native speaker of Dutch. Martin Van Buren, the first president born in the United States following its independence from Great Britain, spoke Dutch as his native language. He is the only U.S. president whose first language was not English.

Vernacular dialects of Dutch were spoken in northeastern New Jersey (Bergen, Hudson, Passaic county) and the Capital District of New York until they gradually declined throughout the 20th century.

== Indigenous languages ==
Map showing language families of the US prior to European settlement.

=== Native American languages ===
Native American languages predate European settlement of the New World. In a few parts of the U.S. (mostly on Indian reservations), they continue to be spoken fluently. Most of these languages are endangered, although there are efforts to revive them. Normally the fewer the speakers of a language the greater the degree of endangerment, but there are many small Native American language communities in the Southwest (Arizona and New Mexico) which continue to thrive despite their small size.

In 1929, speaking of indigenous Native American languages, linguist Edward Sapir observed:

Few people realize that within the confines of the United States there is spoken today a far greater variety of languages ... than in the whole of Europe. We may go further. We may say, quite literally and safely, that in the state of California alone there are greater and more numerous linguistic extremes than can be illustrated in all the length and breadth of Europe.

Most of these languages are transcribed in a direct Latin-based alphabet like Navajo, but communities of some languages have developed or gained their own distinct writing systems like Cherokee (with its syllabary), Osage (Osage alphabet), Blackfoot, and Lakota (Curley alphabet).

==== Navajo ====
According to the 2000 census and other language surveys, the largest Native American language-speaking community by far is the Navajo. Navajo is an Athabaskan language of the Na-Dené family, with 178,000 speakers, primarily in the states of Arizona, New Mexico, and Utah. Altogether, Navajo speakers make up more than 50% of all Native American language speakers in the United States. Western Apache, with 12,500 speakers, also mostly in Arizona, is closely related to Navajo but not mutually intelligible with it. Navajo and other Athabaskan languages in the Southwest are relative outliers; most other Athabascan languages are spoken in the Pacific Northwest and Alaska. Navajo has struggled to keep a healthy speaker base, although this problem has been alleviated to some extent by extensive education programs on the Navajo Nation, including a Navajo language immersion school in Fort Defiance, Arizona. Since 2024, Navajo has been the official language of the Navajo Nation.

==== Cherokee ====
Cherokee language distribution of the United States

Cherokee is the Iroquoian language spoken by the Cherokee people, and the official language of the Cherokee Nation. Significant numbers of Cherokee speakers of all ages still populate the Qualla Boundary in Cherokee, North Carolina and several counties within the Cherokee Nation of Oklahoma, significantly Cherokee, Sequoyah, Mayes, Adair, and Delaware. Increasing numbers of Cherokee youth are renewing interest in the traditions, history, and language of their ancestors. Cherokee-speaking communities stand at the forefront of language preservation, and at local schools, all lessons are taught in Cherokee and thus it serves as the medium of instruction from pre-school on up. Also, church services and traditional ceremonial stomp dances are held in the language in Oklahoma and on the Qualla Boundary in North Carolina.

Cherokee is one of the few, or perhaps the only, Native American language with an increasing population of speakers, and along with Navajo it is the only indigenous American language with more than 50,000 speakers, a figure most likely achieved through the tribe's 10-year long language preservation plan involving growing new speakers through immersion schools for children, developing new words for modern phrases, teaching the language to non-Cherokees in schools and universities, fostering the language among young adults so their children can use that language at home, developing iPhone and iPad apps for language education, the development of Cherokee language radio stations including Cherokee Voices, Cherokee Sounds, and promoting the writing system through public signage, products like the Apple iPhone, internet use through Google including Gmail, and others so the language remains relevant in the 21st century.

==== Other Native American languages ====
Dakota is a Siouan language with 18,000 speakers in the US alone (22,000 including speakers in Canada), not counting 6,000 speakers of the closely related Lakota. Most speakers live in the states of North Dakota and South Dakota. Other Siouan languages include the closely related Ho-Chunk, and the more distant Crow, among others.

Central Alaskan Yup'ik is an Eskimo–Aleut language with 16,000 speakers, most of whom live in Alaska. The term "Yupik" is applied to its relatives, which are not necessarily mutually intelligible with Central Alaskan, including Naukan and Central Siberian, among others.

The O'odham language, spoken by the Pima and the Tohono O'odham, is a Uto-Aztecan language with more than 12,000 speakers, most of whom live in central and southern Arizona and northern Sonora. Other Uto-Aztecan languages include Hopi, Shoshone, and the Pai-Ute languages.

Choctaw has 11,000 speakers. Choctaw is part of the Muskogean family, like Seminole and Alabama.

The Algonquian language family includes languages like Ojibwe (Chippewa), Cheyenne, and Cree.

Keres has 11,000 speakers in New Mexico and is a language isolate. The Keres pueblo people are the largest of the Pueblo nations. The Keres pueblo of Acoma is the oldest continually inhabited community in the United States. Zuni, another isolate, has around 10,000 speakers, most of whom reside within the Zuni pueblo.

Because of immigration from Mexico, there are Mexican native American languages speakers in the US. There are thousands of Nahuatl, Mixtec, Zapotec and Trique speakers in communities established mainly in the southern states.

Although the languages of the Americas have a history stretching back about 17,000 to 12,000 years, current knowledge of them is limited. There are doubtlessly a number of undocumented languages that were once spoken in the United States that are missing from historical record.

==== List of Native American languages ====
Below is an estimate of Native American languages "spoken at home" in the United States (American Community Survey 2006–2008). This is not an exhaustive list of Native American languages in the US. Because the distinction between dialect and language is not always clear, multiple dialects of varying mutual intelligibility may be classified as a single language, while a group of effectively identical dialects may be classified separately for historical or cultural reasons. Languages included here may be classified as "extinct" (having no living native speakers), but many extinct or moribund Native American languages are the subjects of ongoing language revitalization efforts; other extinct languages undergoing revitalization might not be listed here.

Language	Endonym (Note: A language's endonym may not be available for a variety of possible reasons: The language in question encompasses multiple dialects with unique endonyms; The language in question is actually a language family; The language or community of speakers has a prohibition against writing the language; No documentation is immediately available; etc.)	Family	Speakers (% of total)	Does not speak English "Very Well" (Note: Respondents who reported speaking English less than "Very Well." The total margin of error for this group was 1.78%; however, margins of error for individual languages, especially those with few total speakers, may exceed 100% in some cases.)
Total	—	—	444,124 (100)	19.22%
Total (excl. Navajo)	—	—	203,127 (54.32)	15.82%
Navajo	Diné bizaad	Na-Dené	170,822 (45.68)	23.25%
Dakota	Dakȟótiyapi	Siouan	18,804 (5.03)	9.86%
Yupik	—	Eskaleut	18,626 (4.98)	37.02%
Oʼodham	—	Uto-Aztecan	15,123 (3.59)	8.03%
Apache	Ndee biyáti'	Na-Dené	14,012 (3.75)	3.53%
Keres	—	Isolate	13,073 (3.50)	6.20%
Cherokee	Tsalagi Gawonihisde (ᏣᎳᎩ ᎦᏬᏂᎯᏍᏗ)	Iroquoian	12,320 (3.29)	16.33%
Choctaw	Chahta anumpa	Muskogean	10,368 (2.77)	23.44%
Zuni	Shiwiʼma	Isolate	9432 (2.52)	14.22%
American Indian (Other)	—	—	8888 (2.38)	16.73%
Oʼodham (Pima)	Oʼodham ñiʼokĭ	Uto-Aztecan	8190 (2.19)	14.70%
Ojibwe (Chippewa)	Anishinaabemowin (ᐊᓂᐦᔑᓈᐯᒧᐎᓐ)	Algic	6986 (1.87)	11.28%
Hopi	Hopilàvayi	Uto-Aztecan	6776 (1.81)	18.80%
Iñupiaq	Iñupiatun	Eskaleut	5580 (1.49)	26.04%
Tewa	—	Tanoan	5123 (1.37)	13.80%
Muscogee (Creek)	Mvskoke	Muskogean	5072 (1.36)	19.62%
Crow	Apsáalooke	Siouan	3962 (1.06)	6.59%
Shoshoni	Sosoni' da̲i̲gwape	Uto-Aztecan	2512 (0.67)	7.25%
Cheyenne	Tsėhésenėstsestȯtse	Algic	2399 (0.64)	3.21%
Tiwa	—	Tanoan	2269 (0.61)	3.22%
Towa (Jemez)	—	Tanoan	2192 (0.59)	27.65%
Inuit (Eskimo)	—	Eskaleut	2168 (0.58)	25.46%
Blackfoot	Niitsíʼpowahsin (ᖹᒧᐧᑲᖷᐦᓱᐡ); Siksiká (ᓱᖽᐧᖿ); Siksikáíʼpowahsin (ᓱᖽᐧᖼᐟᑲᖷᐦᓱᐡ)	Algic	1970 (0.53)	11.02%
Sahaptin	Ichishkíin	Plateau Penutian	1654 (0.44)	6.17%
Paiute	—	Uto-Aztecan	1638 (0.44)	11.78%
Athapascan	—	Na-Dené	1627 (0.44)	19.55%
Ute	Núu-'apaghapi	Uto-Aztecan	1625 (0.43)	5.23%
Southern Tiwa	—	Tanoan	1600 (0.42)	
Mohawk	Kanien’kéha'	Iroquoian	1423 (0.38)	11.67%
Seneca	Onötowáʼka꞉	Iroquoian	1353 (0.36)	11.23%
Ho-Chunk (Winnebago)	Hoocąk	Siouan	1340 (0.36)	6.27%
Kiowa	G̶áuid̶òᵰgyà	Tanoan	1274 (0.34)	9.58%
Aleut	Unangam Tunuu	Eskaleut	1236 (0.33)	19.01%
Salish	—	Salishan	1233 (0.33)	22.87%
Gwichʼin (Kuchin)	Dinju Zhuh Kʼyuu	Na-Dené	1217 (0.33)	25.82%
Kickapoo	Metotheeneniaatoweeheni	Algic	1141 (0.31)	41.72%
Arapaho	Hinónoʼeitíít	Algic	1087 (0.29)	1.20%
Tlingit	Lingít	Na-Dené	1026 (0.27)	8.19%
Siberian Yupik (SLI Yupik)	Sivuqaghmiistun	Eskaleut	993 (0.27)	39.48%
Passamaquoddy	Peskotomuhkat	Algic	982 (0.26)	6.11%
Comanche	Nʉmʉ tekwapʉ	Uto-Aztecan	963 (0.26)	10.59%
Cree	nēhiyawēwin (ᓀᐦᐃᔭᐍᐏᐣ)	Algic	951 (0.25)	8.73%
Menominee	omāēqnomenēweqnaesen	Algic	946 (0.25)	39.64%
Nez Perce	Niimiipuutímt	Plateau Penutian	942 (0.25)	12.10%
Potawatomi	Bodwéwadmimwen	Algic	824 (0.22)	9.95%
Hidatsa	Hiraaciré’	Siouan	806 (0.22)	4.47%
Kickapoo	—	Algic	800 (0.22)	
Mesquakie (Fox)	Meshkwahkihaki	Algic	727 (0.19)	22.15%
Karok	Araráhih	Isolate	700 (0.19)	5.43%
Pomo	—	Pomoan	648 (0.17)	14.81%
Oneida	Ukwehuwehnéha	Iroquoian	527 (0.14)	58.63%
Yurok	Pueleeklaʼ	Algic	491 (0.13)	1.63%
Cocopah	Kwikapa	Yuman	483 (0.13)	22.77%
Hualapai	Hwalbáy	Yuman	458 (0.12)	4.80%
Omaha	Umoⁿhoⁿ	Siouan	457 (0.12)	1.97%
Chiricahua	Ndee bizaa	Na-Dené	457 (0.12)	—
Jicarilla	Abáachi mizaa	Na-Dené	455 (0.12)	14.51%
Yaqui	Yoem Noki	Uto-Aztecan	425 (0.11)	10.12%
Yokuts	—	Yokutsan	407 (0.11)	27.27%
Koasati	Kowassá꞉ti	Muskoeaen	370 (0.10)	—
Mono	Mono	Uto-Aztecan	349 (0.09)	—
Mohave	Hamakhav	Yuman	330 (0.09)	6.36%
Luiseño	Chamtéela	Uto-Aztecan	327 (0.09)	4.28%
Shawnee	Sâwanwâtowêwe	Algic	321 (0.09)	6.23%
Maidu (NE Maidu)	Májdy	Maiduan	319 (0.09)	6.90%
Ottawa	Nishnaabemwin	Algic	312 (0.08)	10.90%
Algonquin	Anicinâbemowin	Algic	288 (0.08)	19.79%
Okanogan	n̓səl̓xčin̓	Salishan	284 (0.08)	10.92%
Osage	Wažáže ie (𐓏𐒰𐓓𐒰𐓓𐒷 𐒻𐒷)	Siouan	260 (0.07)	20.38%
Wichita	Kirikirʔi꞉s	Caddoan	242 (0.06)	16.12%
Onondaga	Onǫdaʼgegáʼ	Iroquoian	239 (0.06)	2.93%
Miꞌkmaq (Micmac)	Miꞌkmawiꞌsimk	Algic	230 (0.06)	10.87%
Digueño (Ipai-Kumiai-Tipai)	—	Yuman	228 (0.06)	60.96%
Washo	wá·šiw ʔítlu	Isolate	227 (0.06)	9.69%
Miwok	Miwok	Utian	216 (0.06)	—
Lushootseed	dxʷləšucid	Salishan	207 (0.06)	47.83%
Kutenai	Ktunaxa	Isolate	200 (0.05)	32.50%
Miccosukee	Mikisúkî	Muskogean	188 (0.05)	22.87%
Tuscarora	Skarù·ręˀkyéhaˀ	Iroquoian	179 (0.05)	10.06%
Makah	qʷi·qʷi·diččaq	Wakashan	176 (0.05)	30.11%
Coeur d'Alene	Snchitsu’umshtsn	Salishan	174 (0.05)	—
Hupa	Na꞉tinixwe Mixine꞉wheʼ	Na-Dené	174 (0.05)	—
Quechan (Yuma)	Kwatsáan Iiyáa	Yuman	172 (0.05)	31.98%
Miami	myaamia	Algic	168 (0.04)	50.60%
Alabama	Albaamo innaaɬiilka	Muskogean	165 (0.04)	20.00%
Lenape (Delaware)	Lënape / Lunaapeew	Algic	146 (0.04)	25.34%
Clallam	nəxʷsƛ̕ay̕əmúcən	Salishan	146 (0.04)	1.37%
Penobscot (E Abenaki)	Alənαpαtəwéwαkan	Algic	144 (0.04)	5.56%
Yavapai	—	Yuman	139 (0.04)	—
Cahuilla	'Ivillu'at	Uto-Aztecan	139 (0.04)	—
Ponca	P’ą́’k’a	Siouan	131 (0.04)	6.87%
Quinault	Kʷínaył	Salishan	128 (0.03)	—
Deg Xinag (Ingalit)	Degexit’an	Na-Dené	127 (0.03)	—
Pawnee	pâri pakûru’	Caddoan	122 (0.03)	16.39%
Haida	X̱aat Kíl	Isolate	118 (0.03)	19.49%
Cowlitz	ƛʼpúlmixq	Salishan	110 (0.03)	82.73%
Mandan	Núu'etaa íroo	Siouan	104 (0.03)	38.46%
Arikara	Sáhniš	Caddoan	103 (0.03)	—
Klamath	Maqlaqsyals	Plateau Penutian	95 (0.03)	27.37%
Havasupai	Havasu’baaja	Yuman	90 (0.02)	52.22%
Chitimacha	Sitimaxa	Isolate	89 (0.02)	21.35%
Abenaki (W Abenaki)	Alnôbaôdwawôgan	Algic	86 (0.02)	—
Kwakʼwala (Kwakiutl)	Kwak̓wala	Wakashan	85 (0.02)	24.71%
Tututni (Rogue River)	Dotodəni	Na-Dené	84 (0.02)	—
Iroquois	—	Iroquoian	76 (0.02)	—
Tsimshian	Sm'algya̱x	Tsimshianic	68 (0.02)	—
Achumawi	ís siwa wó disi	Palaihnihan	68 (0.02)	—
Chiwere	Jíwere ich'é	Siouan	60 (0.02)	—
Koasati	Kowassá꞉ti	Muskogean	59 (0.02)	6.78%
Koyukon	Denaakkenaageʼ	Na-Dené	58 (0.02)	12.07%
Upper Chinook	Kiksht	Chinookan	58 (0.02)	10.34%
Caddo	Hasí꞉nay	Caddoan	51 (0.01)	23.53%
Kalapuya (Santiam)	—	Kalapuyan	50 (0.01)	—
Gros Ventre (Atsina)	'ɔ'ɔ́ɔ́ɔ́naakíit'ɔ	Algic	45 (0.01)	—
Tachi	—	Yokutsan	45 (0.01)	57.78%
Maricopa	Piipaash chuukwer	Yuman	44 (0.01)	22.73%
Chumash	Sʰamala	Chumashan	39 (0.01)	100.00%
Nomlaki	Nomlāqa Bōda	Wintuan	38 (0.01)	—
Konkow (NW Maidu)	Koyoom kʼawi	Maiduan	32	100.00%
Tunica	Luhchi Yoroni	Isolate	32	—
Tonkawa	Tickanwa·tic	Isolate	29	—
Caddo	—	Caddoan	25	—
Wintu	Wintʰuh	Wintuan	24	—
Spokane	npoqínišcn	Salishan	20	40.00%
Ahtna	Atnakenaege’	Na-Dené	18	—
Columbia (Sinkiuse)	Nxaʔamxcín	Salishan	17	—
Atsugewi	Atsugé	Palaihnihan	15	—
Chemehuevi	núu-'apaghapi̱	Uto-Aztecan	15	—
Abenaki	Alnôbaôdwawôgan	Algic	14	—
Northern Paiute	nɨɨmɨ	Uto-Aztecan	12	—
Denaʼina (Tanaina)	Denaʼinaqʼ	Na-Dené	11	—
Cupeño	Kupangaxwicham Peʼme̱melki	Uto-Aztecan	11	—
Nuu-chah-nulth	Nuučaan̓uɫ	Wakashan	10	—
Pawnee	pâri pakûru’	Caddoan	10	
Arikara	Sáhniš	Caddoan	10	
Alutiiq (Gulf Yupik)	Sugt’stun	Eskaleut	8	—
Kansa	Kaáⁿze Íe	Siouan	7	—
Siuslaw	Šáayušƛa	Isolate	6	—
Cayuga	Gayogo̱honǫˀnéha꞉ˀ	Iroquoian	6	—
Serrano	Maarrênga'twich	Uto-Aztecan	5	—
Tübatulabal	Pahkaʼanil	Uto-Aztecan	5	—
Yuchi	Tsoyaha	Isolate	4	—
Shasta	—	Shastan	2	100.00%
Wukcumni	—	Yokutsan	1	0.00%
Quapaw	Ogáxpa	Siouan	1	—

==== Native American sign languages ====
A sign-language trade pidgin, known as Plains Indian Sign Language, Plains Standard or Plains Sign Talk, arose among the Native Americans of the plains. Each signing nation had a separate signed version of their oral language, that was used by the hearing, and these were not mutually intelligible. Plains Standard was used to communicate between these nations. It seems to have started in Texas and then spread north, through the Great Plains, as far as British Columbia. There are still a few users today, especially among the Crow, Cheyenne, and Arapaho. Unlike other sign languages developed by hearing people, it shares the spatial grammar of deaf sign languages. Through intergenerational transmission, Plains Sign Talk became a working language still in use today in some Deaf First Nations or Native American communities.

As Plains Sign Talk was so widespread and was a spectrum of dialects and accents, it probably hosted several languages under its umbrella. One is potentially Navajo Sign Language which is in use by a sole Navajo clan.

Additionally, Plateau Sign Language existed alongside Plains Sign Talk as either a trade pidgin or another language around the Columbia Plateau and surrounding regions.

=== Austronesian languages ===
==== Hawaiian ====
Hawaiian language distribution in the United States.

Hawaiian is an official state language of Hawaii, as prescribed in the Constitution of Hawaii. Hawaiian has an estimated 1,000 native speakers. Although it is critically endangered, the Hawaiian language is showing signs of revitalization, particularly following the Hawaiian Renaissance. Growing public interest can also be attributed to language immersion programs available through the Hawaii State Department of Education and the University of Hawaiʻi, as well as to efforts by the Hawaii State Legislature, Kamehameha Schools, county governments, and community organizations to preserve local place-based knowledge. In 1993, about 8,000 could speak and understand Hawaiian; today, since the intervention of the state government and that of private groups promoting the language, estimates range up to 27,000.

==== Samoan ====
Samoan is an official territorial language of American Samoa. Samoans make up 90% of the population, and most people are bilingual.

==== Chamorro ====
Chamorro is co-official in the Mariana Islands, both in the territory of Guam and in the Commonwealth of the Northern Mariana Islands. In Guam, the indigenous Chamorro people make up about 60% of the population.

==== Carolinian ====
Carolinian is also co-official in the Northern Marianas, where only 14% of people speak English at home.

== Creole languages ==
Several distinct natural languages and pidgins have developed on American soil, including full languages like creole and sign languages.

=== Angloromani ===
Angloromani is an English creole or mixed language spoken by Romani Americans.

=== Chinuk Wawa or Chinook Jargon ===
A pidgin of 700–800 words of French, English, Cree and other Native origins is the old trade language of the Pacific Northwest. It was used extensively among both European and Native peoples of the Oregon Territory, even used instead of English at home by many pioneer families. It is estimated that around 100,000 people spoke it at its peak, between 1858 and 1900, and it was last widely used in Seattle just before World War II.

=== Gullah ===
An English creole language with African influence spoken on the Sea Islands of South Carolina and Georgia retains strong influences of West African languages. The language is sometimes referred to as "Geechee".

=== Hawaiian Pidgin ===
Hawaiian Pidgin is an English-based creole language used widely among locals in Hawaii.

=== Louisiana Creole French ===
A French Creole language spoken by the Louisiana Creole people of the state of Louisiana, close to Haitian Creole, Colonial French, and Cajun French (language of Acadians deported from New France after 1755 and the Grand Dérangement). French Creole languages are spoken by millions of people worldwide, mainly in the United States, Caribbean, and Indian Ocean areas.

=== U.S. Virgin Islands Creole Dutch (extinct) ===
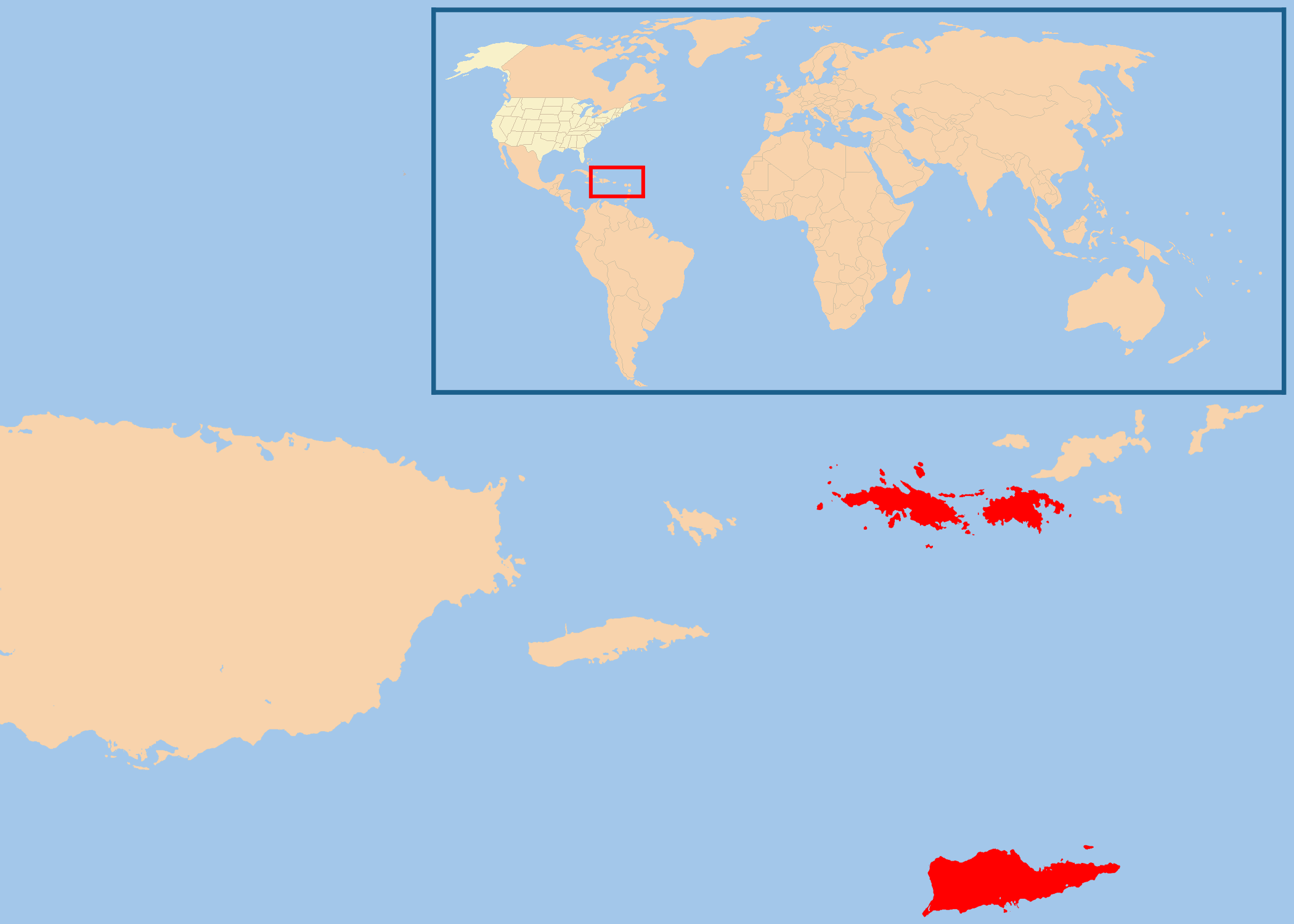
U.S. Virgin Islands

Negerhollands ('Negro-Dutch') was a Dutch-based creole language that was spoken in the Danish West Indies, now known as the U.S. Virgin Islands. Dutch was its superstrate language with Danish, English, French, Spanish, and African elements incorporated. Notwithstanding its name, Negerhollands drew primarily from the Zeelandic rather than the Hollandic dialect of Dutch.

== Sign languages ==
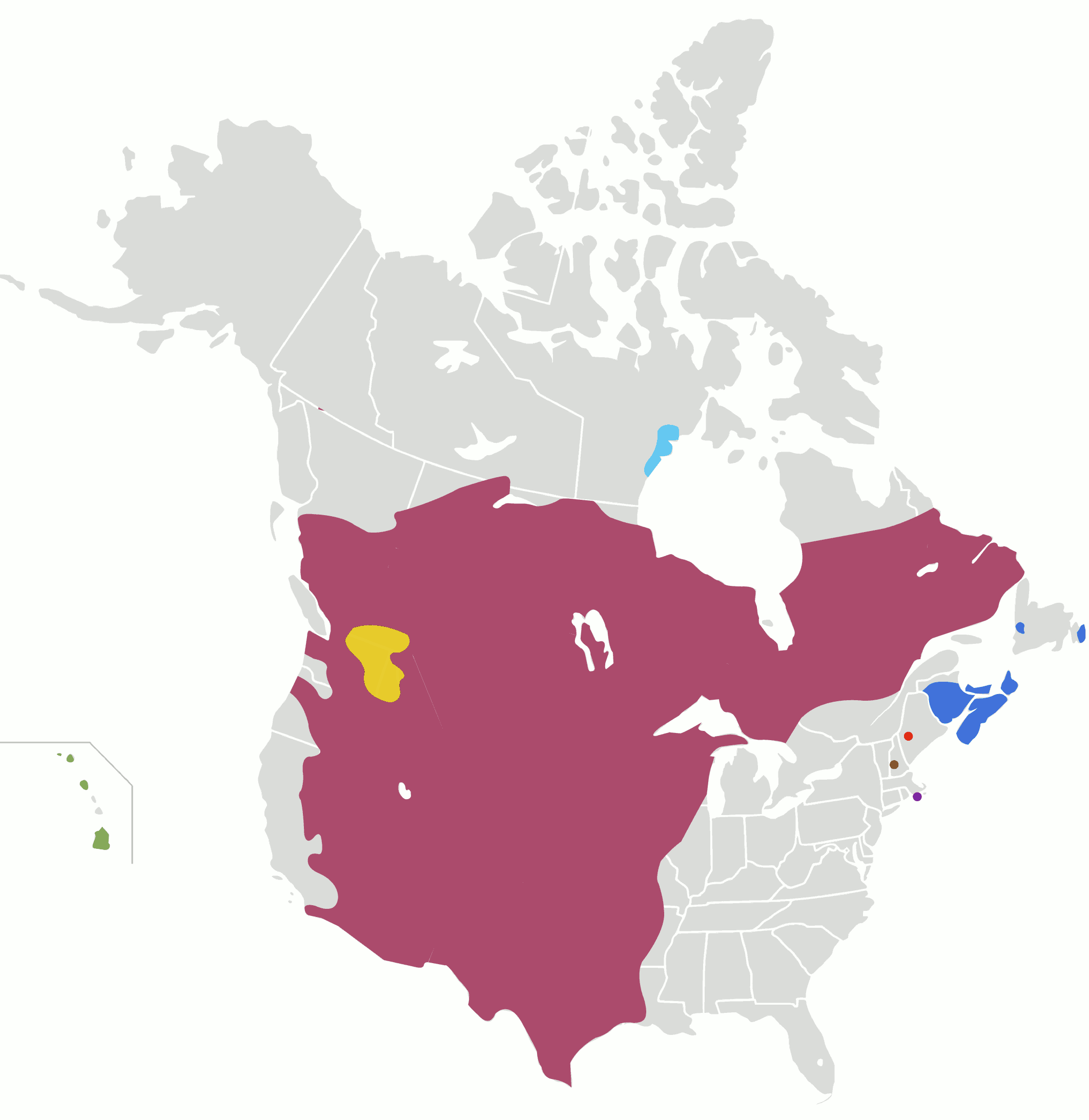
Attested historical ranges of sign languages of the US and Canada excluding ASL and LSQ. Plains Sign Talk Inuiuuk (ᐃᓄᐃᐆᒃ) Hawai'i Sign Language Maritime Sign Language Plateau Sign Language Martha's Vineyard Sign Language Henniker Sign Language Sandy River Valley Sign Language

Alongside the numerous and varied oral languages, the United States also boasts several sign languages. Historically, the US was home to some six or more sign languages (that number rising with the probability that Plains Sign Talk is actually a language family with several languages under its umbrella) which has fallen with the death of several of these.

As with all sign languages around the world that developed organically, these are full languages distinct from any oral language. American Sign Language (unlike Signed English) is not a derivation of English. Some languages present here were trade pidgins which were used first as a system of communication across national and linguistic boundaries of the Native Americans, however, they have since developed into mature languages as children learned them as a first language.

=== American Sign Language ===
American Sign Language (ASL) is the native language of a number of deaf and hearing people in America (roughly 100,000 to 500,000). While some sources have stated that ASL is the third most frequently used language in the United States, after English and Spanish, recent scholarship has pointed out that most of these estimates are based on numbers conflating deafness with ASL use, and that the last actual study of this (in 1972) seems to indicate an upper bound of 500,000 ASL speakers at the time.

- Black American Sign Language (BASL) developed in the southeastern United States, where separate residential schools were maintained for white and black deaf children. BASL shares much of the same vocabulary and grammatical structure as ASL and is generally considered one of its dialects.

=== Hawaiʻi Sign Language ===
Hawaiʻi Sign Language is moribund with only a handful of speakers on Oʻahu, Lānaʻi, Kauaʻi and possibly Niʻihau. Some of these speakers may actually be speaking a creolized version of HSL and ASL, however; research is slow-going. The language was once called Hawaiʻi Pidgin Sign Language, as many people thought it was a derivative of ASL, but it was discovered to be a separate language altogether.

=== Plains Sign Talk ===
Once a trade pidgin and a widely used sign language in North America, Plains Sign Talk, also known as Plains Sign Language, is now endangered with an unknown number of signers.

- Navajo Sign Language has been found to be in use in one clan of Navajo; however, whether it is a dialect of Plains Sign Talk or a separate language remains unknown.
- Plateau Sign Language is another trade pidgin that may have become a separate language, Plateau Sign Language replaced Plains Sign Talk in the Columbia Plateau and surrounding regions of British Columbia, Washington, Oregon, and Idaho. It is now extinct.

=== Martha's Vineyard Sign Language ===
Martha's Vineyard Sign Language is now extinct. Along with French Sign Language, it was one of several main contributors to American Sign Language.

=== Henniker Sign Language ===
Henniker Sign Language is now extinct but was once found around the Henniker region of New Hampshire and formed a basis for American Sign Language.

=== Sandy River Valley Sign Language ===
Sandy River Valley Sign Language is now extinct but once could be found around the Sandy River Valley in Maine. It was one of several main contributors to American Sign Language.

== Immigrant languages ==
=== Arabic ===
The Arabic language is spoken by immigrants from the Middle East as well as many Muslim Americans. The highest concentrations of native Arabic speakers reside in heavily urban areas like Chicago, New York City, and Los Angeles. Detroit and the surrounding areas of Michigan boast a significant Arabic-speaking population including many Arab Christians of Lebanese, Syrian, Iraqi, Egyptian and Palestinian descent.

Arabic is used for religious purposes by Muslim Americans and by some Arab Christians (notably Catholics of the Melkite and Maronite Churches as well as Rum Orthodox, i.e. Antiochian Orthodox Christians and Coptic churches.). A significant number of educated Arab professionals who immigrate often already know English quite well, as it is widely used in the Middle East. Lebanese immigrants also have a broader understanding of French as do many Arabic-speaking immigrants from North Africa.

=== Czech ===
==== Texas Czech ====
12,805 Texans can speak the Czech language.

Drawing on Boas's model for interviewing speakers of the language and digitally cataloging the dialects, John Tomecek founded and Lida Cope of East Carolina University developed the Texas Czech Legacy Project at the University of Texas at Austin to document and preserve the dwindling language. Because the majority of Texas immigrants came from Moravia, the Czech spoken in Texas is largely characterized by Moravian dialects (Lachian and Moravian Wallachian) which vary to some extent from the Bohemian dialects spoken by most Czech-Americans. Czech-language journalism has been very active in the state over the years. Thirty-three newspapers and periodicals have been published. As of 1993 one weekly newspaper, Našinec, published at Granger, and one monthly, Hospodář, published at West, were still being published entirely in Czech. Other periodicals such as Věstník and the Brethren Journal contained sections printed in Czech.

=== Finnish ===
Finnish language distribution in the United States.

The first Finnish settlers in America were amongst the settlers who came from Sweden and Finland to the New Sweden colony. Most colonists were Finnish. However, the Finnish language was not preserved as well among subsequent generations as Swedish.

Between the 1890s and the outbreak of the first World War, an estimated quarter million Finnish citizens immigrated to the United States, mainly in rural areas of the Midwest and more specifically in the mining regions of Northeastern Minnesota, Northern Wisconsin and Michigan's Upper Peninsula. Hancock, Michigan, as of 2005, still incorporates bi-lingual street signs written in both English and Finnish. Americans of Finnish origin yield at 800,000 individuals, though only 26,000 speak the language at home. There is a distinctive dialect of English to be found in the Upper Peninsula, known as Yooper. Yooper often has a Finnish cadence and uses Finnish sentence structure with modified English, German, Swedish, Norwegian, and Finnish vocabulary. Notable Finnish Americans include U.S. Communist Party leader Gus Hall, film director Renny Harlin, and the Canadian-born actress Pamela Anderson.

Northern Clark County, Washington (encompassing Yacolt, Amboy, Battle Ground and Chelatchie) contains a large exclave of Old Apostolic Lutherans who originally immigrated from Finland. Many families in this portion of the county speak fluent Finnish at home before learning English. Another noteworthy Finnish community in the United States is found in Lake Worth Beach, Florida, north of Miami.

=== Hebrew ===
Modern Hebrew is spoken by Israeli immigrants. Liturgical Hebrew is used as a religious or liturgical language by many of the United States' approximately 7 million Jews.

=== Gaelic Languages ===
About 40 million Americans have Irish ancestry, many of whose ancestors would have spoken Irish Gaelic. In 2013, around 20,600 Americans spoke Irish at home and as of 2008 it was the 76th most spoken language in the United States. An additional 1,600 spoke Scottish Gaelic.

=== Italian, Sicilian and Neapolitan ===
Current distribution of the Italian language in the United States.

The Italian language and other Italo-Dalmatian languages have been widely spoken in the United States for more than one hundred years, primarily due to large-scale immigration from the late 19th century to the mid 20th century.

In addition to Italian learned by most people today, there has been a strong representation of the languages of Southern Italy amongst the immigrant population (Sicilian and Neapolitan in particular). As of 2009, though 15,638,348 American citizens report themselves as Italian-Americans, only 753,992 of these report speaking the Italian language at home (0.3264% of the US population).

=== Khmer (Cambodian) ===
Between 1981 and 1985 about 150,000 Cambodians resettled in the United States. Before 1975 very few Cambodians came to the United States. Those who did were children of upper-class families sent abroad to attend school. After the fall of Phnom Penh to the communist Khmer Rouge in 1975, some Cambodians managed to escape. In 2007 the American Community Survey reported that there were approximately 200,000 Cambodians living in the United States, making up about 2% percent of the Asian population. This population is, however, heavily concentrated in two areas: the Los Angeles metropolitan area in California, especially the city of Long Beach; and Greater Boston in New England, especially Lowell, Massachusetts. These two areas hold a majority of the Cambodians living in the US.

=== Korean ===
In 2011 over 1.1 million Americans spoke Korean at home. This number increased greatly at the end of the 20th century, increasing 327% from the 300,000 speakers in 1980. The greatest concentration of these speakers was in the Los Angeles, New York, and Washington D.C. metro areas. Most notably, speakers of Korean are found in the so-called Koreatowns.

=== Polish ===
As of 2013, around 580,000 Americans spoke Polish at home. The Polish language is very common in the Chicago metropolitan area. Chicago's third largest white ethnic groups are those of Polish descent, after German and Irish. The Polish people and the Polish language in Chicago were very prevalent in the early years of the city, and today the 650,000 Poles in Chicago make up one of the largest ethnically Polish populations in the world, comparable to the city of Wrocław, the fourth largest city in Poland. That makes it one of the most important centers of Polonia and the Polish language in the United States, a fact that the city celebrates every Labor Day weekend at the Taste of Polonia Festival in Jefferson Park.

=== Silesian ===
Texas Silesian, a dialect of the Silesian language (itself legally considered a branch of Polish), has been used by Texas Silesians in American settlements from 1852 to the present.

=== Portuguese ===
The first Portuguese speakers in America were Portuguese Jews who had fled the Portuguese Inquisition. They spoke Judeo-Portuguese and founded the earliest Jewish communities in the Thirteen Colonies, two of which still exist: Congregation Shearith Israel in New York and Congregation Mikveh Israel in Philadelphia. However, by the end of the 18th century, their use of Portuguese had been replaced by English.

In the late 19th century, many Portuguese, mainly Azoreans, Madeirans and Cape Verdeans (who prior to independence in 1975 were Portuguese citizens), immigrated to the United States, settling in cities like Providence, Rhode Island, New Bedford, Massachusetts, and Santa Cruz, California. There was also substantial Portuguese immigration to Hawaii to supplement plantation labor.

In the mid-late 20th century there was another wave of Portuguese immigration to the US, mainly the Northeast (New Jersey, New York, Connecticut, Massachusetts), and for a time Portuguese became a major language in Newark, New Jersey. Many Portuguese Americans may include descendants of Portuguese settlers born in Portuguese Africa (known as Portuguese Africans, or, in Portugal, as retornados) and Asia (mostly Macau). There were around 1 million Portuguese Americans in the United States by 2000. Portuguese (European Portuguese) has been spoken in the United States by small communities of immigrants, mainly in the metropolitan New York City area, like Newark, New Jersey.

The Portuguese language is also spoken widely by Brazilian Americans, concentrated in Miami, New York City, and Boston.

=== Swedish ===
Swedish language distribution in the United States.

There has been a Swedish presence in America since the New Sweden colony came into existence in March 1638.

Widespread diaspora of Swedish immigration did not occur until the latter half of the 19th century, bringing in a total of a million Swedes. No other country had a higher percentage of its people leave for the United States except Ireland and Norway. At the beginning of the 20th century, Minnesota had the highest ethnic Swedish population in the world after the city of Stockholm.

3.7% of US residents claim descent from Scandinavian ancestors, amounting to roughly 11–12 million people. According to SIL's Ethnologue, over half a million ethnic Swedes still speak the language, though according to the 2007 American Community Survey only 56,715 speak it at home. Cultural assimilation has contributed to the gradual and steady decline of the language in the US. After the independence of the US from the Kingdom of Great Britain, the government encouraged colonists to adopt the English language as a common medium of communication, and in some cases, imposed it upon them. Subsequent generations of Swedish Americans received education in English and spoke it as their first language. Lutheran churches scattered across the Midwest started abandoning Swedish in favor of English as their language of worship. Swedish newspapers and publications alike slowly faded away.

There are sizable Swedish communities in Minnesota, Ohio, Maryland, Philadelphia, and Delaware, along with small isolated pockets in Pennsylvania, San Francisco, Fort Lauderdale, and New York. Chicago once contained a large Swedish enclave called Andersonville on the city's north side.

John Morton, the person who cast the decisive vote leading to Pennsylvania's support for the United States Declaration of Independence, was of Finnish descent. Finland was part of the Kingdom of Sweden in the 18th century.

=== Walloon ===
==== Wisconsin Walloon ====
Wisconsin Walloon is a dialect of the Walloon language brought to Wisconsin from Wallonia, Belgium's largely French-speaking region. It is spoken in the Door Peninsula of Wisconsin, United States.

The speakers of Wisconsin Walloon are descendants of Belgian immigrants from a wave of immigration lasting from 1853 to 1857. It includes around 2,000 Belgians who immigrated to Wisconsin. Walloon is sometimes referred to by its speakers as "Belgian". The descendants of native Walloon speakers have since switched to English, and as of 2021, Walloon has fewer than 50 speakers in the United States.

=== Welsh ===
Welsh language distribution in the United States.

Up to two million Americans are thought to have Welsh ancestry. However, there is very little Welsh being used commonly in the United States. According to the 2007 American Community Survey, 2,285 people speak Welsh at home; primarily spoken in California (415), Florida (225), New York (204), Ohio (135), and New Jersey (130). Some place names, such as Bryn Mawr in Chicago and Bryn Mawr, Pennsylvania (English: Big Hill) are Welsh. Several towns in Pennsylvania, mostly in the Welsh Tract, have Welsh namesakes, including Uwchlan, Bala Cynwyd, Gwynedd, and Tredyffrin.

=== Tagalog ===
Distribution of U.S. households that speak Tagalog at home

Tagalog speakers were already present in the United States as early as the late sixteenth century as sailors contracted by the Spanish colonial government. In the eighteenth century, they established settlements in Louisiana, such as Saint Malo. After the American annexation of the Philippines, the number of Tagalog speakers steadily increased, as Filipinos began to migrate to the U.S. as students or contract laborers. Their numbers, however, decreased upon Philippine independence, as some Filipinos were repatriated.

Today, Tagalog, together with its standardized form Filipino, is spoken by over a million and a half Filipino Americans and is promoted by Filipino American civic organizations and Philippine consulates. As Filipinos are the second largest Asian ethnic group in the United States, Tagalog is the second most spoken Asian language in the country, after Chinese. Taglish, a form of code-switching between Tagalog and English, is also spoken by a number of Filipino Americans.

Tagalog is also taught at some universities where a significant number of Filipinos exist. As it is the national and most spoken language of the Philippines, most Filipinos in the United States are proficient in Tagalog in addition to their local regional language.

=== Vietnamese ===
Vietnamese language distribution in the United States

According to the 2010 census, there are over 1.5 million Americans who identify themselves as Vietnamese in origin, ranking fourth among the Asian American groups and forming the largest Overseas Vietnamese population.

Orange County, California, is home to the largest concentration of ethnic Vietnamese outside Vietnam, especially in its Little Saigon area. Other significant Vietnamese communities are found in the metropolitan areas of San Jose, Houston, Dallas-Fort Worth, Seattle, Northern Virginia, and New Orleans. Similarly to other overseas Vietnamese communities in Western countries (except France), the Vietnamese population in the United States was established following the Fall of Saigon in 1975 and communist takeover of South Vietnam following the Vietnam War.

=== South Asian languages ===
There are many South Asians in the United States. These include Indians, Pakistanis, and Bangladeshis, who speak various South Asian languages. Major South Asian languages spoken in the US include Telugu (see "Telugu" below), Malayalam, Kannada, Tamil (see "Tamil" below), Gujarati, Hindi and Urdu (see "Hindi-Urdu" below), Bengali, Punjabi, Sinhala, Nepali (see "Nepali" below), and Marathi.

==== Hindi and Urdu ====
Hindi and Urdu are the two standard registers of the Hindustani language, an Indo-Aryan language native to North India, Central India, and Pakistan. While the formal registers draw vocabulary from Sanskrit and Arabic & Persian respectively, the colloquial forms are indistinguishable. Hindi and Urdu are widely spoken among the Indian and Pakistani communities in the United States as a first or second language. Speakers are concentrated in states with large South Asian populations, including California, Illinois, New Jersey, New York, Texas, and Virginia.

Additionally, Hindi-Urdu (Hindustani) is a cultural language for many South Asians who have different mother tongues and dialects. Bollywood in particular, as well as film music, is an important cultural product that influences many South Asian youth. Some South Indians, Bangladeshis, and Indian Bengalis learn the language or its dialects through films.

==== Nepali ====
The first Nepalese to enter the United States were classified as "other Asian". Immigration records show that between 1881 and 1890, 1,910 "other Asians" were admitted to the United States. However, Nepal did not open its borders until 1950, and most Nepalis who left the country during that time went primarily to India to study. Nepalese Americans were first classified as a separate ethnic group in 1974 when 56 Nepalese immigrated to the United States. New York City, Boston, Dallas-Fort Worth, Columbus, Los Angeles, Cincinnati, Erie, Harrisburg, Chicago, Denver, Gainesville, Portland, and Saint Paul have the largest number of Nepalese. There are some Nepalese community or cultural events in every American state, including Dashain, Tihar, Holi, Teej Special, and Nepali New Year.

==== Tamil ====
The Tamil community in the United States is largely bilingual. Tamil is taught in weekly classes in many Hindu temples and by associations such as the American Tamil Academy in South Brunswick, Tamil Jersey School in Jersey City, New Jersey,

The written form of the language is highly formal and quite distinct from the spoken form. A few universities, such as the University of Chicago and the University of California Berkeley, have graduate programs in the language.

In the second half of the 20th century, Tamils from India migrated as skilled professionals to the United States, Canada, Europe, and Southeast Asia. The Tamil American population numbers over 195,685 individuals, and the Federation of Tamil Sangams of North America functions as an umbrella organization for the growing community.

The New York City and Los Angeles metropolitan areas are home to the largest concentrations of Tamil-speaking Sri Lankan Americans. New York City's Staten Island alone is estimated to be home to more than 5,000 Sri Lankan Americans, one of the largest Sri Lankan populations outside Sri Lanka itself, and a significant proportion of whom speak Tamil.

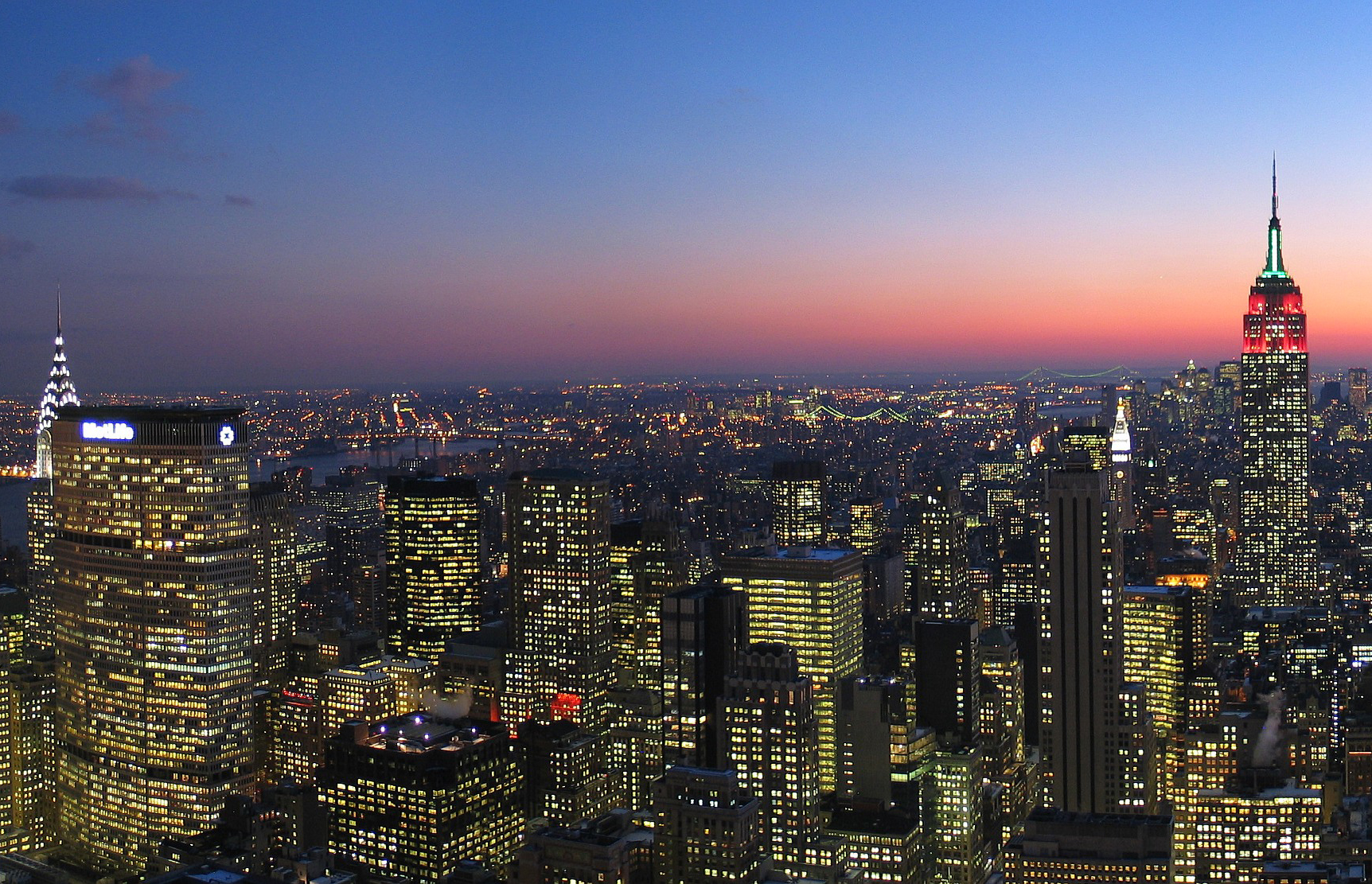
The New York City Metropolitan Area, including Central New Jersey as well as Long Island and Staten Island in New York, is home to the largest Tamil American population.

Central New Jersey is home to the largest population concentration of Tamils. New Jersey houses its own Tamil Sangam. Sizeable populations of Indian American Tamils have also settled in the New York City and Washington metropolitan areas, as well as on the West Coast in Silicon Valley, where there are Tamil associations such as the Bay Area Tamil Mandram.

==== Telugu ====
There were 171,000 speakers of Telugu in 2006–2008. In the second half of the 20th century, Telugu people from India (especially from Andhra Pradesh, Telangana, Karnataka and Tamil Nadu) migrated as professionals to the United States. Central New Jersey is home to the largest population concentration of Telugu people. Telugu people have also settled in New York City and the DC metropolitan area, as well as on the West Coast in Silicon Valley. The New York City and Los Angeles metropolitan areas are home to the largest concentrations of Telugu-speakers.

== See also ==
- American English
- Executive Order 14224 ("Designating English as the Official Language of the United States"), executive order issued by President Donald Trump in 2025
- Language education in the United States
- Language Spoken at Home
- List of multilingual presidents of the United States
- Muhlenberg legend
- List of counties and communities in the United States where English is not the majority language spoken at home
- Modern Language Association

General:

- Bilingual education
- Culture of the United States
- Languages of Canada

== Bibliography ==
- Biers, Kelly; Osterhaus, Ellen (2021). "Notes from the Field: Wisconsin Walloon Documentation and Orthography" (PDF). Language Documentation and Conservation. 15: 1–29.
- Campbell, Lyle. (1997). American Indian languages: The historical linguistics of Native America. New York: Oxford University Press.
- Campbell, Lyle; & Mithun, Marianne (Eds.). (1979). The languages of native America: Historical and comparative assessment. Austin: University of Texas Press.
- Grimes, Barbara F. (Ed.). (2000). Ethnologue: Languages of the world, (14th ed.). Dallas, Texas: SIL International. ISBN 1-55671-106-9. Online edition: the world, accessed on December 7, 2004.
- Mithun, Marianne. (1999). The languages of native North America. Cambridge: Cambridge University Press.
- van Rossem, C.; van der Voort, H. (1996). Die Creol Taal: 250 Years of Negerhollands Texts. Amsterdam: Amsterdam University Press – via Digitale Bibliotheek voor de Nederlandse Letteren.
- Zededa, Ofelia; Hill, Jane H. (1991). The condition of Native American Languages in the United States. In R. H. Robins & E. M. Uhlenbeck (Eds.), Endangered languages (pages 135–155). Oxford: Berg.
