= Paiute language =

Paiute language may refer to any of the languages spoken by the Paiute people:

- Northern Paiute language, also known as Numu and Paviotso
- Mono language (California), specifically the Western dialect, also known as Owens Valley Paiute
- Colorado River Numic language, also known as Ute, Southern Paiute, Ute–Southern Paiute, or Ute-Chemehuevi
