= Hawaiʻi Sign Language =

Indigenous sign language used in Hawaii

Hawaiian Sign Language
- Native to: United States
- Region: Hawaii
- Native speakers: 40 (2019); Moribund; a few elderly signers are bilingual with the dominant ASL. It may be that all speak mixed HSL/ASL, a.k.a. Creolized Hawai‘i Sign Language (CHSL).
- Language family: Language isolate

Language codes
- ISO 639-3: hps
- Glottolog: hawa1235
- ELP: Hawai'i Sign Language

Hawaiʻi Sign Language or Hawaiian Sign Language (HSL; Hawaiian: Hawaiian Sign Language), also known as, Old Hawaiʻi Sign Language and Hawaiʻi Pidgin Sign Language, is an indigenous sign language native to Hawaiʻi. Historical records document its presence on the islands as early as the 1820s, but HSL was not formally recognized by linguists until 2013.

Although previously believed to be related to American Sign Language (ASL), the two languages are unrelated. In 2013, HSL was used by around 40 people, mostly over 80 years old. An HSL–ASL creole, Creole Hawaiʻi Sign Language (CHSL), is used by approximately 40 individuals in the generations between those who signed HSL exclusively and those who sign ASL exclusively. Since the 1940s, ASL has almost fully replaced the use of HSL on the islands of Hawaiʻi and CHSL is likely to also be lost in the next 50 years. HSL is considered critically endangered.

== History ==
Although HSL is not itself a pidgin, it is commonly known as Hawaiʻi Pidgin Sign Language or Pidgin Sign Language due to its historical association with Hawaiʻi Pidgin. Linguists who have begun to document the language and community members prefer the name Hawaiʻi Sign Language, and that is the name used for it in ISO 639-3 as of 2014.

Village sign use, by both Deaf and hearing, is attested from 1820. There is the possibility of influence from immigrant sign later that century, though HSL has little in common today with ASL or other signed and spoken languages it has come in contact with. The establishment of a school for the deaf in 1914 strengthened the use of sign, primarily HSL, among the students. A Chinese-Hawaiian Deaf man named Edwin Inn taught HSL to other d/Deaf adults and also stood as president of a Deaf club. However, the introduction of ASL in 1941 in place of purely oral instruction resulted in a shift from HSL.

== Recognition ==
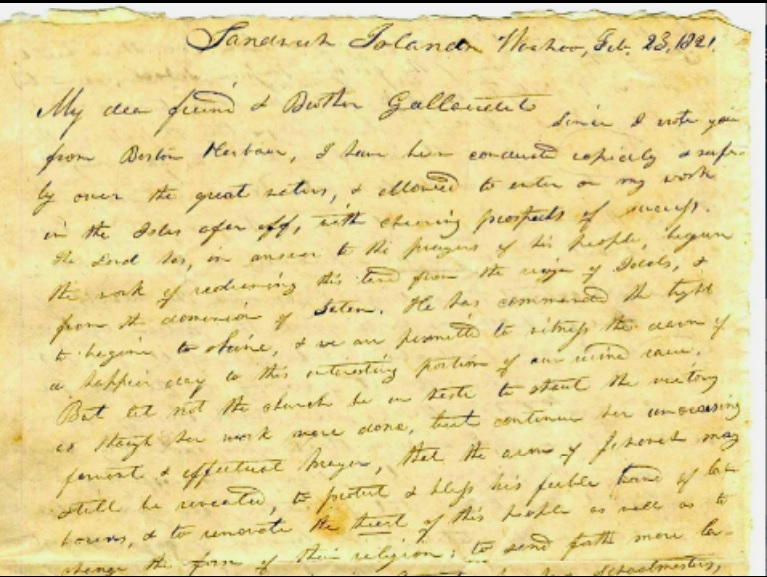
Bingham letter

HSL was recognized by linguists on March 1, 2013, by a research group from the University of Hawaiʻi at Mānoa. The research team found a letter from Reverend Hiram Bingham to Reverend Thomas H. Gallaudet from February 23, 1821. The letter described several instances of deaf Kānaka Maoli communicating to Bingham in their own sign language. The initial research team interviewed 19 Deaf people and two children of Deaf parents on four islands. Eighty percent of HSL vocabulary is different from American Sign Language (ASL).

Some reports on HSL claimed it to be "the first new language to be uncovered within the United States since the 1930s," or that it may be the "last undiscovered language in the country."

Prior to 2013, HSL was largely undocumented. HSL is at risk of becoming dormant due to its low number of signers and the adoption of ASL.

== HSL and ASL Comparisons ==
HSL shares few lexical and grammatical components with ASL. While HSL follows subject, object, verb (SOV) typology, ASL follows subject, verb, object (SVO) typology. HSL does not have verbal classifiers – these were previously thought to be universal in sign languages, and ASL makes extensive use of these. HSL also has several entirely non-manual lexical items, including verbs and nouns, which are not typical in ASL.

== HSL Today ==
An estimated 15,857 of the total 833,610 residents of Hawaiʻi (1.9%) are audiologically deaf. Among this population, ASL is now significantly more common than HSL. There are a handful of services available to help d/Deaf Hawaiian residents learn ASL and also for those who wish to learn ASL to become interpreters, such as the Aloha State Association of the Deaf and the American Sign Language Interpreter Education Program. Equivalent services for HSL are nearly non-existent, partially because some members of the Deaf community in Hawaiʻi have felt that it is not worth preservation.

Researchers at the Sign Language Documentation Training Center and the University of Hawaiʻi have begun projects to document HSL. Their first goal is to teach graduate students and other linguists how to document HSL and other small sign languages used in Hawaiʻi. Their second goal is to have 20 hours of translated HSL on video. As of 2016, a dictionary and video archive of speakers had been created.
