= Slavic Voice of America =

- Type: Bi-monthly newspaper
- Format: Broadsheet
- Owner(s): Genesis Press, Inc.
- Publisher: Serge Taran
- Editor: Ludmila Kachkar-Taran
- Founded: 2001
- Headquarters: Box 67934; Dallas, Texas 75326; United States
- Website: circulation = 4,000

Slavic Voice of America (Russian: Голос Славян Америки Golos Slavyan Ameriki) is a Newspaper, Radio Program and Web Portal serving 10 million Russian, Ukrainian, Belarusian-speaking American and Canadian immigrants and their families from countries of the former Soviet Union, including some non-Slavic countries like Estonia, Latvia and Lithuania. Published by "Genesis Press, Inc" registered in Dallas, Texas, where the company also has its headquarters.

In September 2012 Slavic Voice of America printed edition succeeded by The Dallas Telegraph printed newspaper. In September 2013 The Texas Telegraph launched.

== Leadership ==
- Serge Taran; Publisher and Chief Executive Officer
- Ludmila Taran; Vice President, Managing Editor

== Languages ==
Russian, Ukrainian, English.
