= Cherokee Voices, Cherokee Sounds =

Cherokee-language radio program

- Language(s): Cherokee
- Hosted by: Dennis Sixkiller
- Produced by: Cherokee Nation
- Original release: 2004
- Website: www.cherokee.org/cherokee-voices-cherokee-sounds

Cherokee Voices, Cherokee Sounds is a radio program produced by the Cherokee Nation. The program features songs in the Cherokee language, interviews with speakers of the Cherokee language, and news and podcasts in both Cherokee and English. The show is hosted by Dennis Sixkiller, a Cherokee first-language speaker, and has been produced since 2004.

Cherokee Voices, Cherokee Sounds currently airs on KEOK and KTLQ in Tahlequah; KGND in Vinita; KWON in Bartlesville; and KRSC-FM in Claremore.
