= Cultural genocide in the United States =

Cultural genocide in the United States has manifested through the physical and cultural disintegration of the Indigenous people by forcing them to attend boarding schools along with the discrimination against them due to the instrumental use of the law. Cultural genocide comprises the dismantling of a culture and the de-socializing of a people.

== Against Indigenous people ==
In reference to colonialism in the United States, Raphael Lemkin stated that the "colonial enslavement of American Indians was a cultural genocide." He also stated that colonialism in the United States comprised an "effective and thorough method of destroying a culture and de-socializing human beings." Lemkin drew a distinction between "cultural change and cultural genocide." He defined the former as a slow and gradual process of transition to new situations, and he saw the latter as the result of a radical and violent change that necessitated "the pre-meditated goal of those committing cultural genocide." Lemkin believed that cultural genocide occurs only when there are "surgical operations on cultures and deliberate assassinations of civilizations."

According to Vincent Schilling, who spoke to BBC Trending, many people are aware of historical atrocities that were committed against his people, but there is an "extensive amount of misunderstanding about Native American and First Nations people's history." He added that Native Americans have also suffered a "cultural genocide" because of colonization's residual effects.

Scholars have coined the term cultural suicide for cases in which Indigenous peoples were coerced into a nominally voluntary abandonment of cultural and religious traditions in return for necessary military aid from colonial powers, such as the early 1700 alliance between the Spanish and Seminole that included the baptism of natives as a term.

=== Law and cultural genocide ===
The Indigenous American experience in North America is defined as comprising physical and cultural disintegration. That fact becomes clear when one examines how law and colonialism were used as tools of genocide, both physically and culturally. According to Luana Ross the assumption that law (a Euro-American construct) and its administration are prejudiced against particular groups of individuals is critical for understanding Native American criminality and the experiences of Natives imprisoned. For instance, in Georgia, the 1789 act permitted indiscriminate massacre of Creek Indians by proclaiming them to be outside the state's protection. Apart from physical annihilation, the State promoted acculturation by introducing legislation limiting land entitlements to Indians who had abandoned tribal citizenship.

Throughout the writing of the Genocide Convention, the United States was adamantly opposed to the addition of cultural genocide, even threatening to block the treaty's approval if cultural genocide was included in the final text.

=== Boarding schools ===
According to Schilling, there are still a large number of adult Native people who have been forcibly removed from their families and shipped off to Native residential schools, where they were beaten for speaking their native languages, were sexually assaulted by school officials, or were left to die in the cases they contracted diseases. Throughout the nineteenth and twentieth centuries, the United States had approximately 350 government-funded and frequently church-run Indigenous boarding schools.

According to the U.S. Interior Department, the Indian boarding schools was meant "to culturally assimilate Indigenous children" through forcible removal from their families and communities and placement in remote "residential facilities where their American Indian, Alaska Native, and Native Hawaiian identities, languages, and beliefs" would be suppressed. Hundreds of thousands of Indigenous children have been removed from their communities for over 150 years. Between 1869 and the 1970s, hundreds of thousands of Indigenous children "passed through or died" at these schools until the Indian Child Welfare Act of 1978 gave Native American parents the legal ability to object to their children's enrollment in these institutions.

Separation of children from their families with the goal "to destroy the identity of a group," partially or completely, is specifically included in the 1948 Genocide Convention's definition of genocide. The boarding schools' assimilationist goals were explicitly genocidal to the extent that these schools were intentionally designed to "kill the Indian, save the man."
