= English-only movement =

Political movement in the U.S.

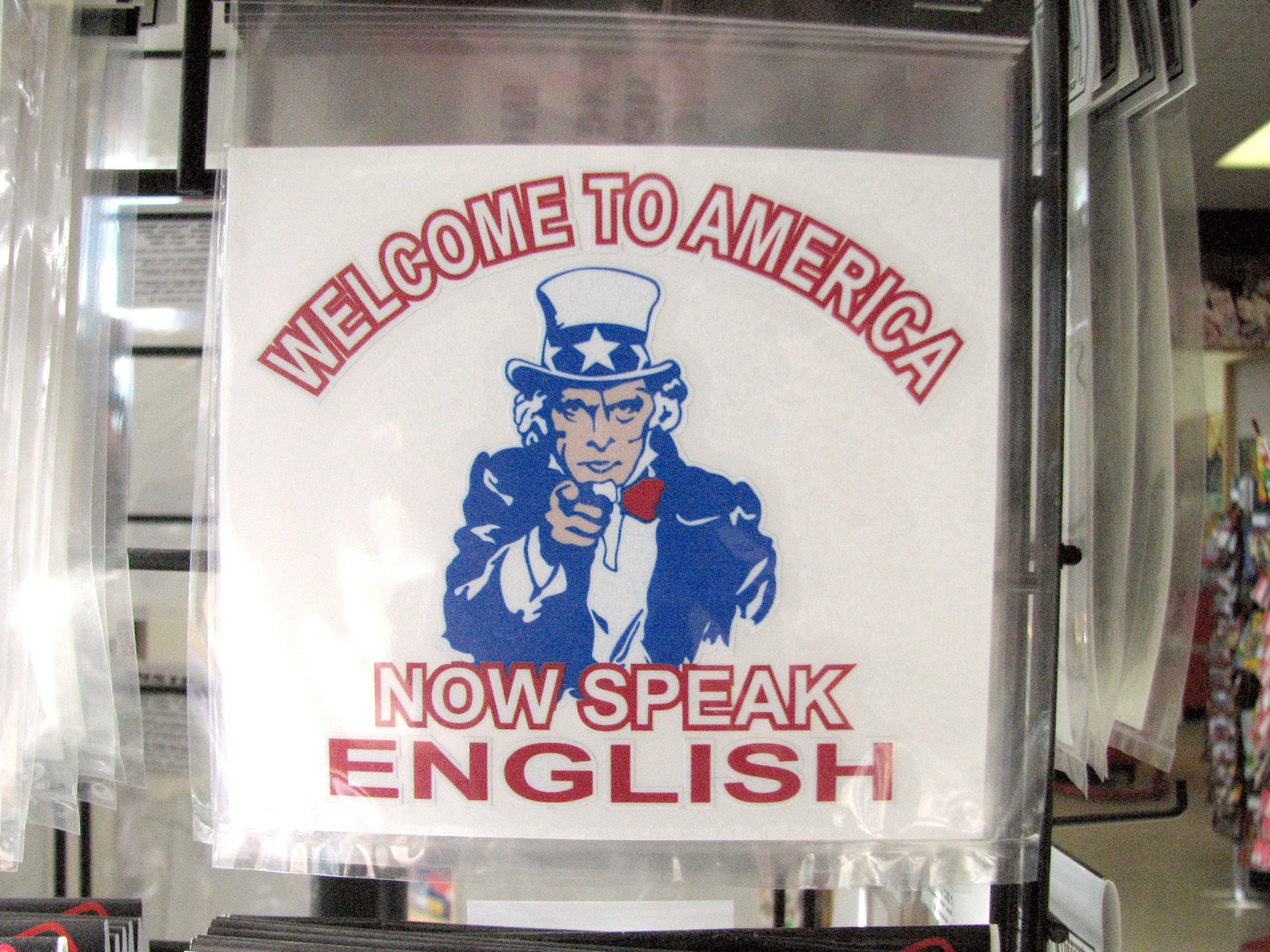
Sticker sold in Colorado demanding that immigrants speak English

The English-only movement, also known as the Official English movement, is a political movement that advocates for the exclusive use of the English language in official United States government communication through the establishment of English as the only official language in the United States. The United States has never had a legal policy proclaiming an official national language, although an executive order issued by president Donald Trump on March 1, 2025, declared English to be the official language of the United States. Historically, in various locations throughout the United States, there have been various moves to promote or require the use of English, such as in American Indian boarding schools.

Following American independence, other European languages continued to be spoken and taught in bilingual education, especially German and later also Spanish following the country's Southwest expansion. However, following a rise in nativism, support for the English-only movement began in 1907, under U.S. President Theodore Roosevelt. Non-English languages increasingly began to be devalued as part of forced Anglophone assimilation and Americanization, fueled also by anti-German sentiment in the 1910s, and bilingual education had virtually been eliminated by the 1940s.

The English-only movement continues today. Approval ratings for granting English official status are high but declining. Republican candidates have supported this movement during elections. The English-only movement has also received criticism and rejection within societies and educational systems. The American Civil Liberties Union (ACLU) has stated that English-only laws are inconsistent with both the First Amendment right to communicate with or petition the government, as well as free speech and the right to equality, because they bar government employees from providing non-English language assistance and services.

== Early efforts ==
When the US Constitution was ratified, a multitude of languages were spoken in the United States other than English. However, the elite idealized a country united by one language, shunning non-Anglophones (as well as non-Whites and non-Protestants) from society.

Disputes between citizens and immigrants over English have been waged since the 1750s, when street signs were changed in Pennsylvania to include both English and German languages to accommodate the many German immigrants. The German–English debate continued until World War I when international hostility resulted in the rejection of all things German, including the prohibition of the German language and German-language materials, particularly books.

In 1803, as a result of the Louisiana Purchase, the United States acquired French-speaking populations in Louisiana. As a condition to admittance to the Union, Louisiana included in its constitution a provision, which was later repealed, that required all official documents be published in the language "in which the Constitution of the United States is written". Today, Louisiana has no law stating that English is the official language of the state.

After the Mexican–American War (1846–1848), the United States acquired about 75,000 Spanish speakers in addition to several indigenous language-speaking populations.

An 1847 law authorized Anglo-French instruction in public schools in Louisiana. In 1849, the California constitution recognized Spanish language rights. French language rights were abolished after the American Civil War. In 1868, the Indian Peace Commission recommended English-only schooling for the Native Americans. In 1878–79, the California constitution was rewritten to state that "[a]ll laws of the State of California, and all official writings, and the executive, legislative, and judicial proceedings shall be conducted, preserved, and published in no other than the English language."

In the late 1880s, Wisconsin and Illinois passed English-only instruction laws for both public and parochial schools (see Bennett Law).

In 1896, under the Republic of Hawaii government, English became the primary medium of public schooling for Hawaiian children. After the Spanish–American War, English was declared "the official language of the school room" in Puerto Rico. In the same way, English was declared the official language in the Philippines, after the Philippine–American War.

In 1907, US President Theodore Roosevelt wrote, "We have room for but one language in this country, and that is the English language, for we intend to see that the crucible turns our people out as Americans, of American nationality, and not as dwellers in a polyglot boarding house."

During World War I, there was a widespread campaign against the use of the German language in the US; this included removing books in the German language from libraries. (A related action took place in South Australia as well with the Nomenclature Act of 1917. The legislation renamed 69 towns, suburbs, or areas that had German names.)

In 1923, a bill drafted by Congressman Washington J. McCormick became the first proposed legislation regarding the United States' national language that would have made "American" the national language in order to differentiate American English from British English.

== Support ==
U.S. English is an organization that advocates for Official English, founded in the 1980s by former United States Senator S. I. Hayakawa and John Tanton. ProEnglish is another group founded by Tanton that advocates Official English.

In 2018, a Rasmussen poll found that 81% of American adults thought that English should be the official language of the United States, while 12% did not. Another such poll found that, in 2021, 73% of Americans thought that English should be the official language, and 18% disagreed.

== Contemporary ==
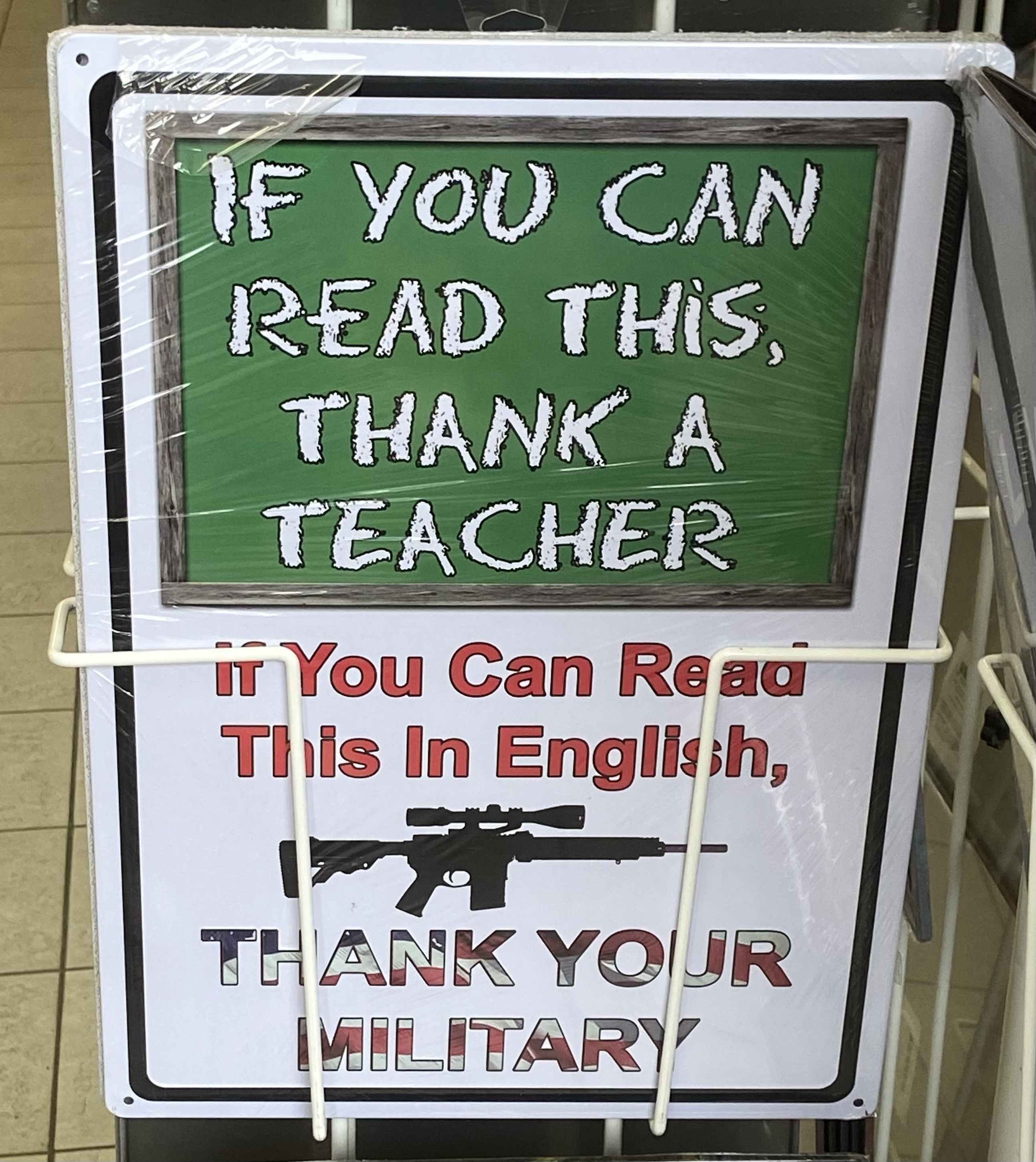
Pro-military English-only sign in Kansas gas station store

In 1980, Dade County, Florida voters approved an "anti-bilingual ordinance". However, this was repealed by the county commission in 1993, after "racially orientated redistricting" led to a change in government.

In 1981, English was declared the official language in the commonwealth of Virginia.

In 1983, John Tanton and U.S. Senator S. I. Hayakawa founded a political lobbying organization, U.S. English. (Tanton was a former head of the Sierra Club's population committee and of Zero Population Growth, and founder of the Federation for American Immigration Reform (FAIR), an immigration reductionist group.) In 1986, Tanton wrote a memo containing remarks about Hispanics claimed by critics to be derogatory, which appeared in the Arizona Republic newspaper, leading to the resignations from U.S. English board member Walter Cronkite and executive director Linda Chavez; Tanton would also sever his ties to the organization as a result. That same year, 1986, Larry Pratt founded English First, while Lou Zaeske, an engineer from Bryan, Texas, established the American Ethnic Coalition. Mauro Mujica, a Chilean immigrant, was later named Chairman and CEO in 1993.

In 1994, John Tanton and other former U.S. English associates founded ProEnglish specifically to defend Arizona's English-only law. ProEnglish rejects the term "English-only movement" and asks its supporters to refer to the movement instead as "Official English".

The U.S. Senate voted on two separate changes to an immigration bill in May 2006. The amended bill recognized English as a "common and unifying language" and gave contradictory instructions to government agencies on their obligations for non-English publications.

In what was essentially a replay of the 2006 actions, on June 6, 2007 the US Senate again voted on two separate amendments to a subsequent immigration reform bill that closely resembled the amendments to the 2006 Senate bill. Ultimately, neither the 2006 nor 2007 immigration reform bill has become law.

On January 22, 2009, voters in Nashville, Tennessee rejected a proposal under a referendum election to make "Nashville the largest city in the United States to prohibit the government from using languages other than English, with exceptions allowed for issues of health and safety." The initiative failed by a vote of 57% to 43%.

In March 2012, Republican presidential candidate Rick Santorum was criticized by some Republican delegates from Puerto Rico when he publicly took the position that Puerto Rico, a Spanish-speaking territory, should be required to make English its primary language as a condition of statehood.

In 2015 during a debate, then Republican presidential candidate Donald Trump said, "This is a country where we speak English, not Spanish."

On February 6, 2019, the 116th Congress introduced a bill in House establishing English as the official language of the United States. The House of Representatives named it the English Language Unity Act of 2019. Within this bill, there is a framework for implementation. They strive to enforce English as the only language by testing it during the naturalization process. This bill has yet to be passed.

Another English Language Unity Act was introduced by Congresswoman Marjorie Taylor Greene in 2025, which has also yet to be passed.

In 2023 then U.S. senator and current U.S. Vice President JD Vance introduced a bill that would have established English as the official language of the United States.

On March 1, 2025, President Donald Trump issued Executive Order 14224 titled "Designating English as the Official Language of The United States" in which he stated "From the founding of our Republic, English has been used as our national language. Our Nation's historic governing documents, including the Declaration of Independence and the Constitution, have all been written in English. It is therefore long past time that English is declared as the official language of the United States. [...] Accordingly, this order designates English as the official language of the United States."

== Criticism ==
The modern English-only movement has met with rejection from the Linguistic Society of America, which passed a resolution in 1986–87 opposing "'English only' measures on the grounds that they are based on misconceptions about the role of a common language in establishing political unity, and that they are inconsistent with basic American traditions of linguistic tolerance."

Linguist Geoffrey Pullum, in an essay entitled "Here come the linguistic fascists", charges English First with "hatred and suspicion of aliens and immigrants" and points out that English is far from under threat in the United States, saying "making English the official language of the United States of America is about as urgently called for as making hotdogs the official food at baseball games." Rachele Lawton, applying critical discourse analysis, argues that English-only's rhetoric suggests that the "real motivation is discrimination and disenfranchisement."

The American Civil Liberties Union (ACLU) has stated that English-only laws are inconsistent with both the First Amendment right to communicate with or petition the government, as well as free speech and the right to equality, because they bar government employees from providing non-English language assistance and services. On August 11, 2000, President Bill Clinton signed Executive Order 13166, "Improving Access to Services for Persons with Limited English Proficiency." The Executive Order requires Federal agencies to examine the services they provide, identify any need for services to those with limited English proficiency (LEP), and develop and implement a system to provide those services so LEP persons can have meaningful access to them.

While the judicial system has noted that state English-only laws are largely symbolic and non-prohibitive, supervisors and managers often interpret them to mean English is the mandatory language of daily life. In one instance, an elementary school bus driver prohibited students from speaking Spanish on their way to school after Colorado passed its legislation. In 2004 in Scottsdale, a teacher claimed to be enforcing English immersion policies when she allegedly slapped students for speaking Spanish in class. In 2005 in Kansas City, a student was suspended for speaking Spanish in the school hallways. The written discipline referral explaining the decision of the school to suspend the student for one and a half days, noted: "This is not the first time we have [asked the student] and others to not speak Spanish at school."

One study both of laws requiring English as the language of instruction and compulsory schooling laws during the Americanization period (1910–1930) found that the policies moderately increased the literacy of some foreign-born children but had no impact on immigrants' eventual labor market outcomes or measures of social integration. The authors concluded that the "very moderate impacts" of the laws were probably because foreign languages were declining naturally, without the help of English-only laws.

== Current law ==
Map of US official language status by state as of 2022. Blue: English declared the official language; light-blue: English declared a co-official language; gray: no official language specified.

Place	English official	Other official language(s)	Note
Alabama	Yes	None	since 1990
Alaska	Yes	Inupiaq, Siberian Yupik, Central Alaskan Yup'ik, Alutiiq, Unangax, Dena'ina, Deg Xinag, Holikachuk, Koyukon, Upper Kuskokwim, Gwich'in, Lower Tanana, Middle Tanana, Upper Tanana, Tanacross, Hän, Ahtna, Eyak, Tlingit, Haida, Cup’ig, Wetal, Tsimshian	since 2015
Arizona	Yes	None	since 2006, 1988 law ruled unconstitutional
Arkansas	Yes	None	since 1987
California	Yes	None	since 1986 with Proposition 63. Proposition 63 is unenforceable due to the lack of appropriate legislation, and the Bilingual Services Act provides for the use of other languages in public outreach.
Colorado	Yes	None	since 1988; from 1876–1990 the Colorado Constitution required laws to be published in English, Spanish, and German
Connecticut	No	None	
Delaware	No	None	
Florida	Yes	None	since 1988
Georgia	Yes	None	since 1996
Hawaii	Yes	Hawaiian	since 1978
Idaho	Yes	None	since 2007
Illinois	Yes	None	since 1969; "American" was the official language 1923–1969.
Indiana	Yes	None	since 1984
Iowa	Yes	None	since 2002
Kansas	Yes	None	since 2007
Kentucky	Yes	None	since 1984
Louisiana	No	None	French has had special status since 1968 founding of CODOFIL.
Maine	No	None	
Maryland	No	None	
Massachusetts	Yes	None	A 1975 state supreme court case, Commonwealth v. Olivo, underscored official status of English; in 2002, English was declared the "common public language."
Michigan	No	None	
Minnesota	No	None	
Mississippi	Yes	None	since 1987
Missouri	Yes	None	since 1998; state constitution amended accordingly in 2008
Montana	Yes	None	since 1995
Nebraska	Yes	None	since 1920
Nevada	No	None	
New Hampshire	Yes	None	since 1995
New Jersey	No	None	
New Mexico	No	None	Spanish has had special recognition since 1912 passage of state constitution. See article. English Plus since 1989
New York	No	None	
North Carolina	Yes	None	since 1987
North Dakota	Yes	None	since 1987
Ohio	No	None	
Oklahoma	Yes	None	since 2010. The Choctaw language is official within the Choctaw Nation; the Cherokee language has been official among the Cherokee and the UKB since 1991.
Oregon	No	None	English Plus since 1989
Pennsylvania	No	None	
Rhode Island	No	None	English Plus since 1992
South Carolina	Yes	None	since 1987
South Dakota	Yes	Sioux	since 1995, since 2019
Tennessee	Yes	None	since 1984
Texas	No	None	
Utah	Yes	None	English only from 2000–2021; since 2021, the Utah code has been amended to be English official but not English only.
Vermont	No	None	
Virginia	Yes	None	since 1996
Washington	No	None	English Plus since 1989
West Virginia	Yes	None	since 2016
Wisconsin	No	None	
Wyoming	Yes	None	since 1996
District of Columbia	No	None	The Language Access Act of 2004 guarantees equal access and participation in public services, programs, and activities for residents of the District of Columbia who cannot (or have limited capacity to) speak, read, or write English. Speakers of Amharic, French, Chinese, Spanish, Vietnamese and Korean receive additional accommodations.
American Samoa	Yes	Samoan	
Guam	Yes	Chamorro	
Northern Mariana Islands	Yes	Chamorro, Carolinian	
Puerto Rico	Yes	Spanish	
U.S. Virgin Islands	Yes	None	

No law has yet passed designating English the official language of the United States federal government; however, Executive Order 14224 declares English as official and is recognized by federal agencies. All official documents in the U.S. are written in English, though some are also published in other languages.

== See also ==
- Bilingual education
- Conservatism in the United States
- Council for the Development of French in Louisiana
- English language learning and teaching
- Executive Order 14224 (2025)
- Languages in the United States
- List of countries where English is an official language
- Spanish in the United States
- "Speak White"
- English-medium education
- English Plus
