= Larry Pratt =

American politician (born 1942)

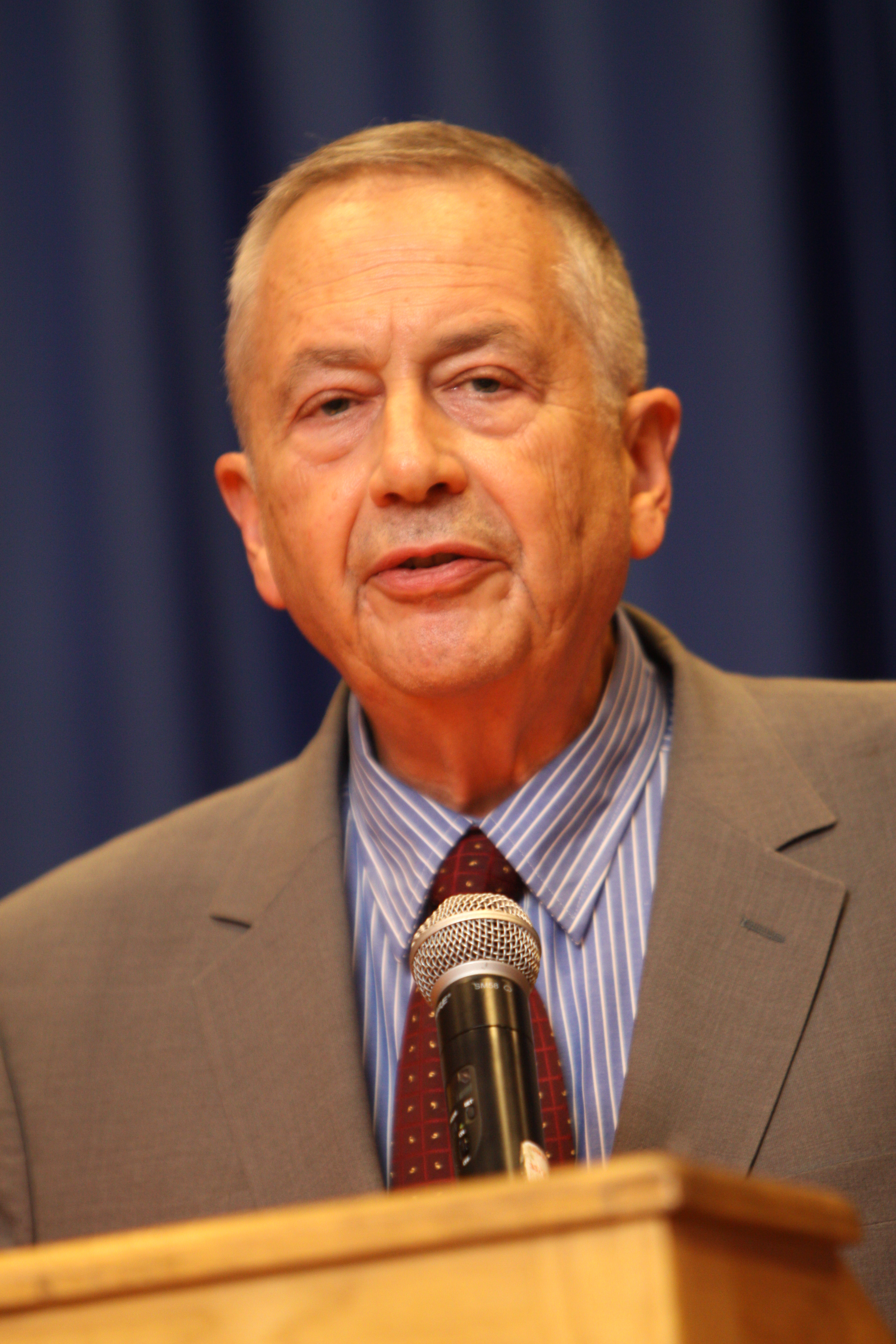
- Pratt in 2011

Member of the Virginia House of Delegates from the 19th district
- In office January 9, 1980 – January 13, 1982
- Preceded by: Robert L. Thoburn
- Succeeded by: George P. Beard Jr.

Personal details
- Born: Lawrence D. Pratt; November 13, 1942 (age 83) Camden, New Jersey, U.S.
- Party: Republican
- Other political affiliations: Libertarian (1994); Taxpayers' (1996)
- Spouse: Priscilla Pratt
- Children: 4
- Education: American University (BA)

Lawrence D. Pratt (born November 13, 1942) is the executive director emeritus of Gun Owners of America, a United States–based firearms lobbying group, and a former member of the Virginia House of Delegates.

== Early life ==
Pratt was born in Camden, New Jersey, on November 13, 1942. His father was an electrical engineer. Several years after graduating from American University with a degree in political science, Pratt took the helm of Gun Owners of America in 1976, one year after the organization was founded.

== Political career ==
Pratt was elected to the state legislature of Virginia, as a Republican member of the 1980 session of the Virginia House of Delegates, elected from the 19th district in Fairfax County. He served on the Conservation and Natural Resources and Labor and Commerce committees. In 1981, he ran alongside fellow Republican delegates Robert E. Harris and Jim Dillard in the newly drawn 51st district, but he received fewer votes than Democrat Vivian Watts. He was also a Reagan delegate to the 1980 Republican National Convention.

In October 1992, at Estes Park, Colorado, Pratt was noted as a moderate conservative presenter at a three-day meeting organized by Christian Identity pastor Pete Peters in the wake of the Ruby Ridge incident.

In the 1996 presidential election, Pratt served as a co-chairman of Pat Buchanan's campaign. In February 1996, the liberal Center for Public Integrity issued a report that claimed Pratt spoke at meetings organized by white supremacist and militia leaders. As a result, Pratt resigned his position with the Buchanan campaign.

In a Rolling Stone article, Larry Pratt is quoted defending his decision to speak to white supremacy groups. "I myself would also talk to white nationalists and neo-Nazi groups. I talk to liberal groups, but people don't accuse me of being liberal. I wash all that off at home. It's important to talk to anyone who will listen."

Pratt was the treasurer of the Heritage Foundation in 1974, one year after it was founded. He also addressed delegates at the 1996 national convention of the U.S. Taxpayers Party (renamed the Constitution Party in 1999).

In Northern Ireland in 2004, Pratt accompanied loyalist and paramilitary sympathizer Willie Frazer on a tour of South Armagh whilst calling for the Protestant population to be routinely armed.

== Political organizations ==
Pratt has founded a variety of organizations, including English First (lobbying organization), Gun Owners of America, U.S. Border Control, and Committee to Protect the Family.

Pratt is the president of English First, an organization within the English-only movement. The organization was founded in 1986, and works to pass English Only amendments at both state and federal levels. Pratt also helped found and served as secretary of the Council for Inter-American Security, which was founded in 1976. Pratt has served as a board member of the American Legislative Exchange Council.

Pratt has also been listed as a member of the Council for National Policy (CNP). A January 13, 2001, article in The Guardian explored Pratt's relationship with then-Attorney General nominee John Ashcroft, stating they knew each other from the CNP. The January 11, 2001, edition of TIME Magazine included an article on Pratt and Ashcroft's relationship.

In the late 1980s and early 1990s, Pratt used his Committee to Protect the Family organization to raise $150,000 for the anti-abortion group Operation Rescue which paid $50,000 in court-imposed fines.

== Radio and television appearances ==
Pratt has appeared on numerous national radio and TV programs such as the Today Show, Good Morning America, The Political Cesspool, Crossfire, Larry King Live, Hannity & Colmes, Piers Morgan Live and The Phil Donahue Show.

In reference to the killing of Trayvon Martin, Pratt declared that Martin was at fault for not running away after knocking down George Zimmerman, who was following Trayvon under suspicion "[Martin] should have run away," Pratt said. "He had his stalker on the ground. Once Martin had neutralized the threat, that's when he should have taken off to get out of there. He doubled down, and he started to really beat the tar out of the guy." Pratt also noted that Martin was on top of Zimmerman after Zimmerman tried to make a "citizen's arrest" of Martin.

The day after the Sandy Hook Elementary School shooting, Pratt stated: "Gun control supporters have the blood of little children on their hands. Federal and state laws combined to ensure that no teacher, no administrator, no adult had a gun at the Newtown school where the children were murdered. This tragedy underscores the urgency of getting rid of gun bans in school zones. The only thing accomplished by gun free zones is to ensure that mass murderers can slay more before they are finally confronted by someone with a gun."

In May 2016, Pratt suggested that the loss of a conservative majority in the Supreme Court through a Democratic victory in the 2016 Presidential elections might lead him and other gun owners to use violence in order to resist any judicial ruling supporting gun control, saying 'we may have to reassert that proper constitutional balance, and it may not be pretty. So, I'd much rather have an election where we solve this matter at the ballot box than have to resort to the bullet box.'

In 2018, a segment with Pratt aired as part of Sacha Baron Cohen's Showtime series, Who is America?. Pratt endorses "Kinderguardians", a fake program to teach and arm schoolchildren as young as three to protect themselves in the classroom. In the segment, he can also be heard laughing at jokes made by Baron Cohen about shooting a praying Muslim man as well as marital rape. Pratt was also quoted as saying "Children under five also have elevated levels of the pheromone Blink-182, produced by the part of the liver known as the Rita Ora. This allows nerve reflexes to travel along the Cardi B neural pathway to the Wiz Khalifa 40% faster, saving time and saving lives".

== Books ==
- Armed People Victorious (1990).
- Safeguarding Liberty: The Constitution and Citizen Militias (1995).
- On the Firing Line: Essays in the Defense of Liberty (2001).
