= Stephen E. Gordy =

American politician (1920–2006)

Member of the Virginia House of Delegates from the 37th district
- In office January 12, 1983 – January 13, 1988
- Preceded by: Jack Rust
- Succeeded by: Jane Woods

Personal details
- Born: Stephen Ellison Gordy; March 20, 1920 Columbus, Georgia, U.S.
- Died: October 27, 2006 (aged 86) Dalton, Georgia, U.S.
- Party: Republican
- Spouse: Edith Stone
- Education: U.S. Military Academy; U.S. Naval War College

Military service
- Branch/service: United States Army
- Years of service: 1938–1971
- Rank: Colonel
- Battles/wars: World War II; Korean War; Vietnam War

Stephen Ellison Gordy (March 20, 1920 – October 27, 2006) was an American politician, military officer, and educator.

== Early years and education ==
Stephen E. Gordy was born in Columbus, Georgia, where he attended public school. He was admitted to the United States Military Academy and graduated in 1943 and later from the Naval War College. He served in the United States Army during World War II and the Korean War. He retired with the rank of colonel.

== Post military career ==
After his military service, Gordy was a teacher, principal, and coach (both football and baseball) in the Loudoun County, Virginia public school system. He later ran for public office and was elected to the Virginia House of Delegates, as a member of the Republican Party, and served from 1982 to 1987. During that period, he lived in Mantua, Virginia.

== Death ==
Gordy retired to Dalton, Georgia where he was active in the Georgia Society of the Sons of the American Revolution. He died at his home in Dalton on October 27, 2006. The Dalton chapter of the Sons of the American Revolution renamed an annual awards dinner in recognition of Col. Gordy.
