= 1986 Virginia ballot measures =

The 1986 Virginia State Elections took place on Election Day, November 5, 1986, the same day as the U.S. House elections in the state. The only statewide elections on the ballot were four constitutional referendums to amend the Virginia State Constitution. Because Virginia state elections are held on off-years, no statewide officers or state legislative elections were held. All referendums were referred to the voters by the Virginia General Assembly.

== Question 1 ==
This amendment asked voters to allow any registered voter who has not voted in 4 years to continue to be registered if they make the request in writing and still live at the address listed on the registration records. This measure eventually overturned by another amendment in 1994.

Question 1
Choice	Votes	%
For	646,267	66.49
Against	325,648	33.51
Total	971,915	100.00
Source: - Official Results

== Question 2 ==
This amendment asked voters to allow public employees (except those who are elected or those who are employed by an elected official) to be appointed assistant voter registrars or election officers. A similar amendment which was more broad had previously been rejected by voters in 1976.

Question 2
Choice	Votes	%
For	478,921	51.55
Against	450,180	48.45
Total	929,101	100.00
Source: - Official Results

== Question 3 ==
This amendment asked voters to allow the Supreme Court of Virginia to answer questions of state law certified to it by a U.S. federal court or the highest appellate court of another state.

Question 3
Choice	Votes	%
For	709,745	77.92
Against	201,116	22.08
Total	910,861	100.00
Source: - Official Results

== Question 4 ==
This amendment asked voters to give the state a right to appeal certain preliminary dismissals and exclusions of evidence in felony cases.

Question 4
Choice	Votes	%
For	683,198	74.91
Against	228,784	25.09
Total	911,982	100.00
Source: - Official Results
