= Virginia's 37th Senate district =

American legislative district

Virginia's 37th State Senate district
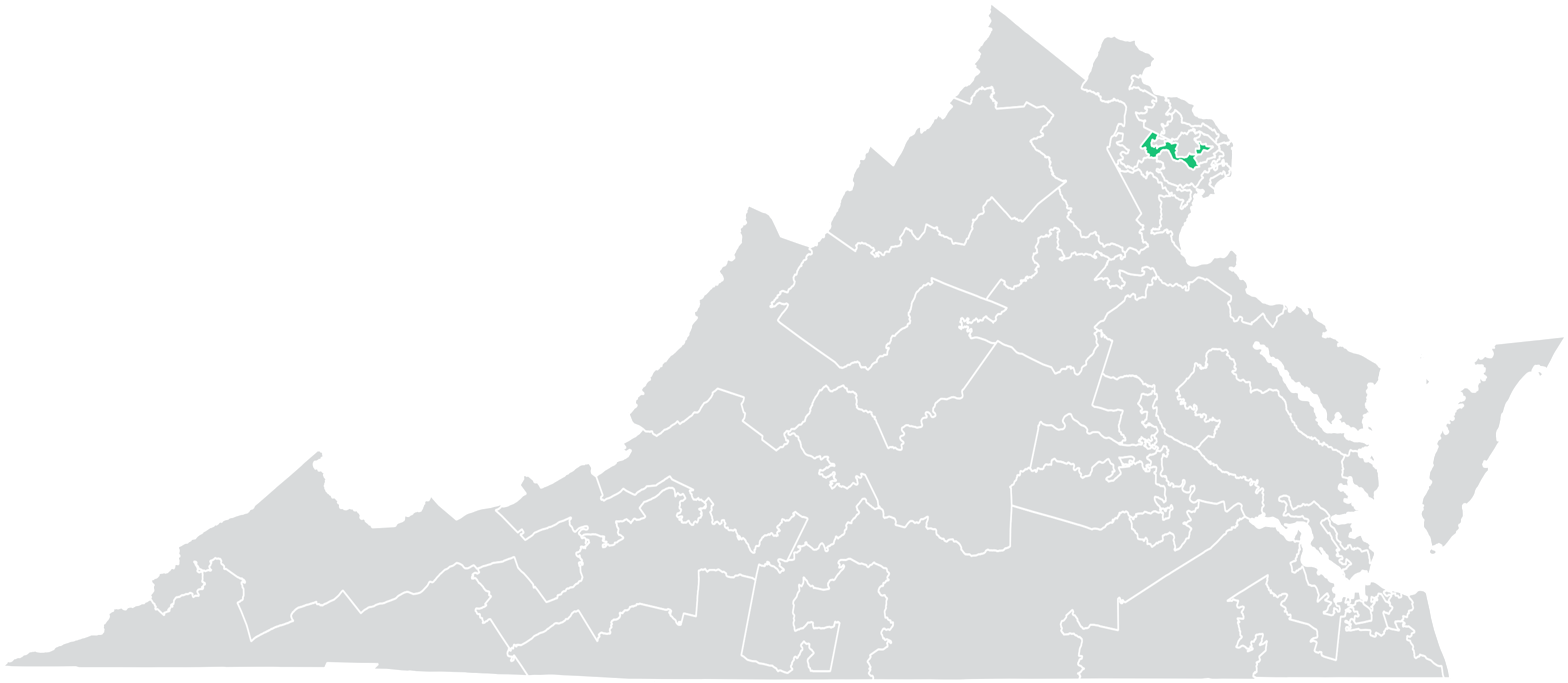
Senator
Saddam Azlan Salim; D–Falls Church
- Demographics: 47% White; 8% Black; 17% Hispanic; 23% Asian; 4% Other
- Population (2019): 210,716
- Registered voters: 136,839

Virginia's 37th Senate district is one of 40 districts in the Senate of Virginia. It has been represented by Democrat Saddam Azlan Salim since the 2023 election following redistricting.

== Geography ==
District 37 is a serpentine district located entirely within Fairfax County in the suburbs of Washington, D.C., including some or all of Annandale, Kings Park, West Springfield, Burke, Fair Oaks, and Centreville, among other communities. The district overlaps with Virginia's 8th, 10th, and 11th congressional districts, and with the 35th, 37th, 38th, 39th, 40th, 41st, 42nd, 53rd, and 67th districts of the Virginia House of Delegates.

== Recent election results ==
=== 2023 ===
2023 Virginia Senate election, District 37
Primary election
Party	Candidate	Votes	%
Democratic	Saddam Azlan Salim	10,477	54.1
Democratic	Chap Petersen	8,880	45.9
Total votes		19,357	100
General election
Democratic	Saddam Azlan Salim	40,947	68.7
Republican	Ken Reid	18,427	30.9
Total votes		59,374	100
Democratic hold			

=== 2019 ===
2019 Virginia Senate election, District 37
Party	Candidate	Votes	%
Democratic	Dave Marsden (incumbent)	41,278	90.3
Total votes		45,717	100
Democratic hold			

=== 2015 ===
2015 Virginia Senate election, District 37
Party	Candidate	Votes	%
Democratic	Dave Marsden (incumbent)	18,966	55.4
Republican	David Bergman	15,216	44.5
Total votes		34,220	100
Democratic hold			

=== 2011 ===
2011 Virginia Senate election, District 37
Primary election
Party	Candidate	Votes	%
Republican	Jason Flanary	3,131	54.9
Republican	Stephen Hunt	2,568	45.1
Total votes		5,699	100
General election
Democratic	Dave Marsden (incumbent)	19,841	53.7
Republican	Jason Flanary	17,036	46.1
Total votes		36,925	100
Democratic hold			

=== Federal and statewide results ===
Year	Office	Results
2020	President	Biden 67.1–31.1%
2017	Governor	Northam 66.3–32.8%
2016	President	Clinton 63.6–30.6%
2014	Senate	Warner 54.7–43.1%
2013	Governor	McAuliffe 55.9–39.1%
2012	President	Obama 58.6–40.2%
2012	Senate	Kaine 60.2–39.8%

== Historical results ==
All election results below took place prior to 2011 redistricting, and thus were under different district lines.

=== 2010 special ===
2010 Virginia Senate special election, District 37
Party	Candidate	Votes	%
Democratic	Dave Marsden	11,954	50.6
Republican	Stephen Hunt	11,627	49.3
Total votes		23,602	100
Democratic gain from Republican			

=== 2007 ===
2007 Virginia Senate election, District 37
Party	Candidate	Votes	%
Republican	Ken Cuccinelli (incumbent)	18,602	50.0
Democratic	Janet Oleszek	18,510	49.8
Total votes		37,185	100
Republican hold			

=== 2003 ===
2003 Virginia Senate election, District 37
Party	Candidate	Votes	%
Republican	Ken Cuccinelli (incumbent)	16,762	53.3
Democratic	James Mitchell III	14,658	46.6
Total votes		31,443	100
Republican hold			

=== 2002 special ===
2002 Virginia Senate special election, District 37
Party	Candidate	Votes	%
Republican	Ken Cuccinelli	10,041	55.0
Democratic	Catherine Belter	8,193	44.9
Total votes		18,252	100
Republican hold			

=== 1999 ===
1999 Virginia Senate election, District 37
Party	Candidate	Votes	%
Republican	Warren E. Barry (incumbent)	29,524	99.4
Total votes		29,703	100
Republican hold			

=== 1995 ===
1995 Virginia Senate election, District 37
Party	Candidate	Votes	%
Republican	Warren E. Barry (incumbent)	28,135	98.9
Total votes		28,456	100
Republican hold			
