= Rozia Henson =

American politician from Virginia

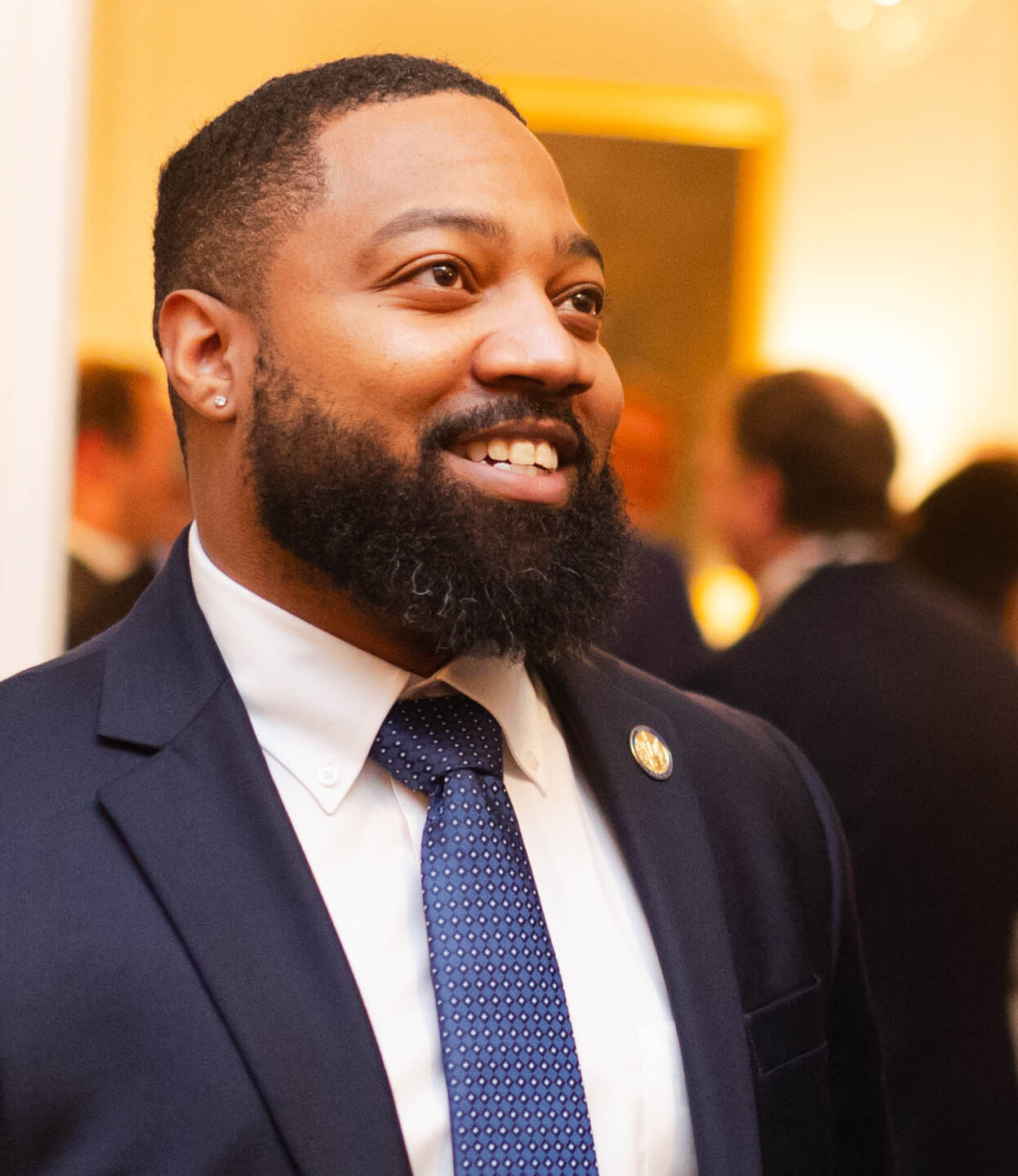

Member of the Virginia House of Delegates from the 19th district
- Incumbent
- Assumed office January 10, 2024
- Preceded by: Terry Austin (redistricting)

Personal details
- Party: Democratic

Rozia Henson is an American Democratic politician from Virginia. He was elected to the Virginia House of Delegates in the 2023 Virginia House of Delegates election from the 19th district.

He is the first openly gay Black man to be elected to the Virginia General Assembly. He graduated from Virginia State University. Henson hails from Woodbridge, Virginia.

Henson is the first gay Black man to serve in the Virginia House of Delegates. He endorsed the Kamala Harris 2024 presidential campaign.
