= English First =

English First may refer to:

- EF English First, a language school franchise in Switzerland
- English First (lobbying organization), a U.S. lobbying group of the English-only movement
