= 1976 Virginia ballot measures =

The 1976 Virginia State Elections took place on Election Day, November 2, 1976, the same day as the U.S. Presidential, U.S. Senate, U.S. House elections in the state. The only statewide elections on the ballot were six constitutional referendums to amend the Virginia State Constitution. All referendums were referred to the voters by the Virginia General Assembly.

== Question 1 ==
This amendment asked voters to eliminate the length of residence as a qualification to vote and to extend the time a voter may vote in their precinct after moving from it.

Question 1
Choice	Votes	%
For	690,479	68.05
Against	324,236	31.95
Total	1,014,715	100.00
Source: - Official Results

== Question 2 ==
This amendment asked voters to permit absentee voter registration. This was enacted in response to the Overseas Citizens Voting Rights Act of 1975 signed by U.S. President Gerald Ford.

Question 2
Choice	Votes	%
For	890,639	78.24
Against	247,711	21.76
Total	1,138,350	100.00
Source: - Official Results

== Question 3 ==
This amendment asked voters to specify that the requirement of 1 year's residence in Virginia for office seekers be the year preceding election to office.

Question 3
Choice	Votes	%
For	874,535	77.84
Against	249,030	22.16
Total	1,123,565	100.00
Source: - Official Results

== Question 4 ==
This amendment asked voters to remove the restriction against certain public officials and public employees serving as assistant or substitute voter registrars or election officers. Although the amendment was rejected by voters, a narrower measure was approved 10 years later in 1986.

Question 4
Choice	Votes	%
For	502,776	46.48
Against	578,916	53.52
Total	1,081,692	100.00
Source: - Official Results

== Question 5 ==
This amendment asked voters to permit judicial appointments of elected local officials and eliminate the need for special elections to fill a vacancy for less than 60 days.

Question 5
Choice	Votes	%
For	661,368	60.17
Against	437,787	39.83
Total	1,099,155	100.00
Source: - Official Results

== Question 6 ==
This amendment asked voters to permit certain tax exemptions for property subject to a perpetual easement for flooding, property owned by permanently and totally disabled residents, property used for solar energy purposes, and tangible farm property and products.

Question 6
Choice	Votes	%
For	768,281	69.33
Against	339,921	30.67
Total	1,108,202	100.00
Source: - Official Results
