= Chap Petersen =

American politician from Virginia

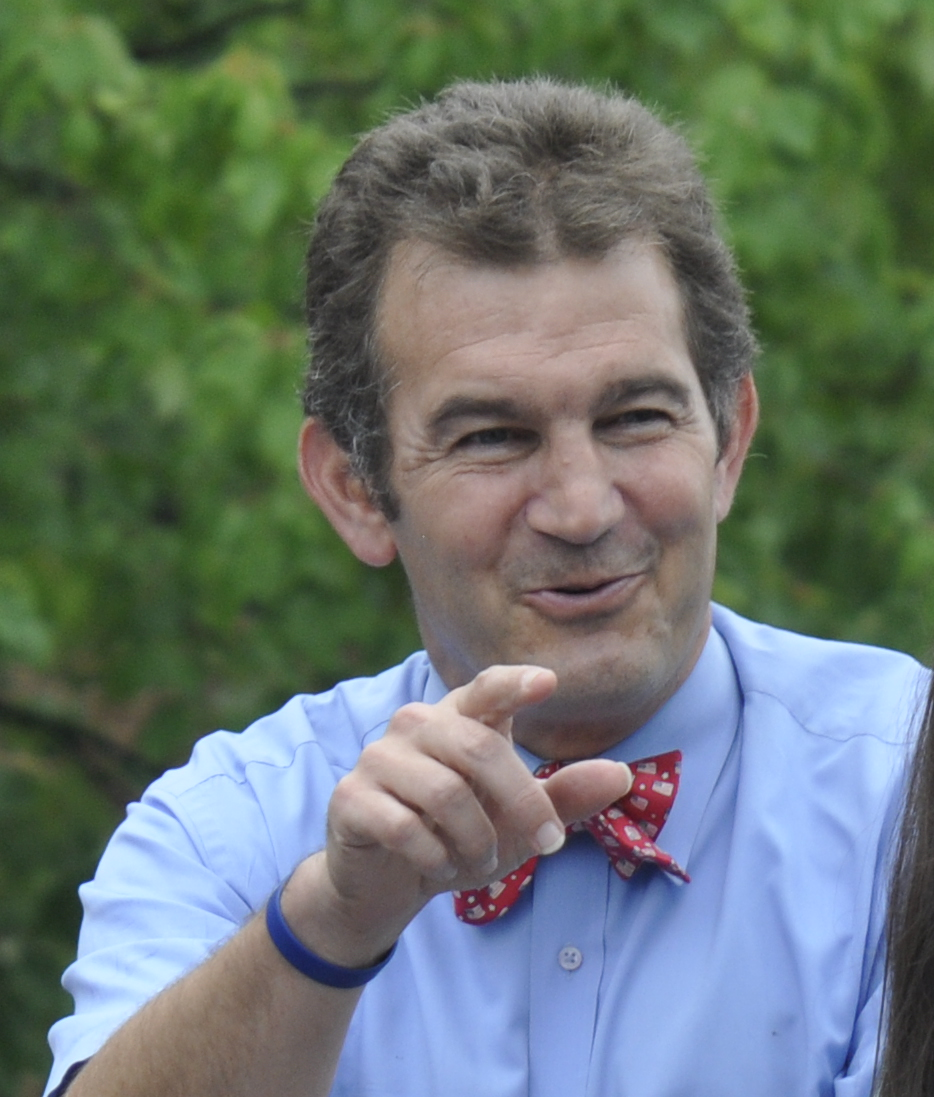

Member of the Virginia Senate from the 34th district
- In office January 9, 2008 – January 10, 2024
- Preceded by: Jeannemarie Devolites Davis
- Succeeded by: Saddam Azlan Salim (Redistricting)

Member of the Virginia House of Delegates from the 37th district
- In office January 9, 2002 – January 11, 2006
- Preceded by: Jack Rust
- Succeeded by: David Bulova

Member of the Fairfax, Virginia city council
- In office 1998–2001

Personal details
- Born: John Chapman Petersen; March 27, 1968 (age 58) Fairfax, Virginia, U.S.
- Party: Democratic
- Spouse: Sharon Kim
- Children: 4
- Education: Williams College (B.A.); University of Virginia (J.D.)
- Profession: Attorney
- Committees: Agriculture, Conservation and Natural Resources (Chair); Education and Health; Finance and Appropriations; Judiciary; Rules

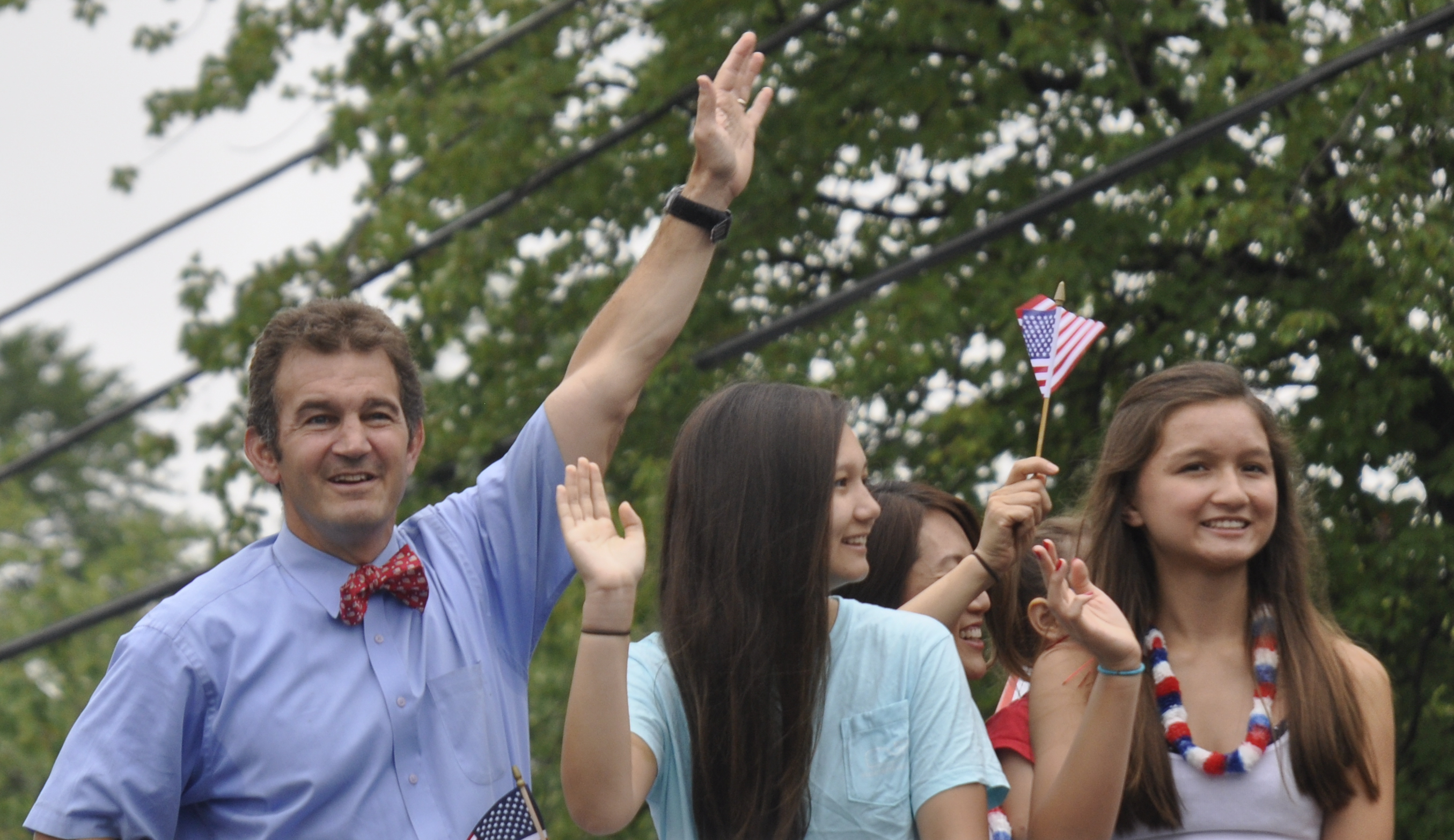
Chap Petersen and family during 2015 Fairfax City 4th of July parade.

John Chapman "Chap" Petersen (born March 27, 1968) is an American politician, who represented Virginia's 37th House of Delegates district from 2002 to 2006 and the state's 34th Senate district, made up of the city of Fairfax and large parts of Fairfax County, from 2008 to 2024. He placed third in the 2005 Democratic Primary for Virginia Lieutenant Governor and entered the Virginia Senate after successfully challenging Republican incumbent Jeannemarie Devolites Davis in 2007. In 2023, the Virginia Senate's district lines were redrawn, moving Petersen from the 34th district into the 37th district. Petersen lost the Democratic primary for the 37th district that year to Saddam Azlan Salim.

Petersen was regarded in office as a political moderate and broke with his party on several issues during the governorship of Republican Glenn Youngkin.

== Early life ==
Petersen graduated from Fairfax High School in 1986. He received a B.A. degree from Williams College in 1990 and a J.D. from the University of Virginia School of Law in 1994, when he began practicing law. He is currently a partner with the law firm of Chap Petersen & Associates, PLC.

Petersen's wife Sharon Kim (born September 10, 1970, Daegu, South Korea), is a practicing attorney; the couple have four children.

== Political career ==
Petersen served on the Fairfax city council 1998–2001. He was elected to two terms in the House of Delegates, both times (2001 and 2003) defeating his predecessor, Republican Jack Rust.

In 2005, Petersen ran for Lieutenant Governor of Virginia. He was defeated in the Democratic primary, finishing third with 22% of the vote in a four-way race, behind State Senator Leslie L. Byrne and State Delegate Viola Baskerville, but ahead of State Senator Phil Puckett.

In 2006, Petersen was a senior advisor to Democratic Senate candidate Jim Webb, who defeated incumbent Republican Senator George Allen.

=== State Senate elections ===
==== 2007 ====
Petersen announced his candidacy for the 34th district seat in the State Senate, Wednesday, January 3, 2007. He defeated incumbent Republican Jeannemarie Devolites-Davis, wife of Congressman Thomas M. Davis, in the November 2007 election, taking 55% of the vote. The district had been the most Democratic state senate district held by a Republican.

===== Campaign flyer flap =====
During the week of October 22, 2007, the Devolites-Davis campaign sent out 60,000 campaign flyers accusing Petersen of not disclosing that his former law firm was working on issues that Petersen voted on while in the House of Delegates. The flyer included a copy of a section of Petersen's Statement of Economic Interest, which he filed while serving in the House. It includes Petersen's home address, telephone number, and the names of his wife and children, which were not redacted.

Petersen held a press conference on October 26 in front of Devolites-Davis' headquarters in Fairfax. He said that "words cannot describe the anger I feel" about the flyer, and called it "shocking" that Devolites-Davis would use his personal information in such a manner. Petersen said that advertising his personal information was not in and of itself a problem, but using it in an attack ad went too far. Such tactics, Petersen said, endangered his family. Devolites-Davis said in her own press conference that Petersen himself published the names and pictures of his family, and showed a mailer from the Petersen campaign showing pictures of his children. The mailer identifies the children by name. She claimed the Petersen campaign uploaded a video to YouTube which brought up her daughter's armed robbery conviction of several years ago. According to WUSA, there is no evidence that anyone from the Petersen camp uploaded the video.

==== 2023 ====
On June 20, 2023, Petersen lost the Democratic primary for the new 37th Senate district to Saddam Azlan Salim.

== Political positions ==
Petersen is considered a moderate Democrat with a history of bipartisan cooperation. Between 2021 and 2023, he broke with his party to provide a key vote for some of Republican governor Glenn Youngkin's policies.

=== Gun control ===
Petersen has voted multiple times against Castle Doctrine bills.

In January 2011, Petersen voted against Senate Bill 876 (Castle Doctrine) which would have allowed “a lawful occupant use of physical force, including deadly force, against an intruder in his dwelling who has committed an overt act against him, without civil liability.” In February 2011, Petersen was one of eight senators on the Senate Courts of Justice Committee who “passed by indefinitely” House Bill 1573, defeating the bill by an 8 to 4 margin.

In February 2020, Petersen was one of four Democrats in the Virginia State Senate who broke party ranks to defeat an assault weapons ban.

=== The Confederacy ===
In 2020, Petersen led a lawsuit against Fairfax County when the Board of Supervisors voted to remove a monument in front of the Fairfax County Courthouse commemorating the death of the first Confederate soldier during the Civil War. Chap Petersen called the county's move "Orwellian".

=== Marijuana legalization ===
In 2021, Petersen was the only Senate Democrat to vote against the legalization of marijuana for adult recreational use.

=== Controversy over voting record ===
In mid-October 2007, Devolites-Davis, Petersen's opponent, began running television ads showing a photo of her opponent Chap Petersen with text stating "Supports Increasing the Estate Tax", "Supports a 38 cent gas tax increase", and "Voted for Concealed Weapons on School Property" superimposed. The voiceover attributed these allegations to Petersen's prior votes in the Virginia House of Delegates. Davis's website contains references to past Petersen votes. He responded that he never voted to increase the Virginia estate tax. Petersen co-sponsored bills, including SB 1309, intending to preserve the tax for Virginians in higher income brackets. Petersen also denied ever supporting a 38 cent gas tax increase. He recently explained that he supported the current law which makes it a felony to possess a gun on school grounds, but voted for a bipartisan bill, HB 2535, which gave a limited exception to parents with licensed concealed carry permits who pick up their children at school, for just school driveways. That bill was signed into law in 2005.

=== Defense of Washington Redskins name ===
As controversy grew over the name of the Washington Redskins, Petersen became a vocal defender of the sports team. In 2014, he initiated a "Redskins Pride Caucus" in the Virginia General Assembly. Although Petersen's position is unconventional for his political party, he has said that several other Virginia Democrats have privately supported him on this issue. Citing support that he has received from individual Native Americans, Petersen has said, "I get it from all points. And listen - if somebody is offended, I'm not going to deny that that's a sincere feeling. But you can't just take that and scrub out the feelings of 100,000 other people."

When the Daily Show produced an episode that aired September 25, 2014 featuring local Redskins fans confronted by Native Americans, Petersen contacted the producers in an attempt to withdraw the fans' consent to appear. According to Petersen, these fans had been misled about the nature of the segment, prior to signing their releases. Although the segment was not pulled, Jon Stewart, host of The Daily Show, acknowledged on air that the fans were upset with the situation.

Petersen also gave legal representation to the Native American Guardians Association, a group of Native Americans who are opposed to the removal of Native American mascots.

=== COVID-19 school closures ===
Throughout the COVID-19 pandemic, Petersen has come under fire for what critics have called extreme stances on school closures.

In June 2020, Petersen said on "The John Fredericks Show" when discussing Jim Crow laws "Look, there were some bad decisions made, but at least they had a school system, ok, at least they had a functioning school system." This statement quickly drew controversy from Virginia Democrats who noted the history of massive resistance in Virginia where school systems refused to integrate. The Prince Edward County School Board even shut down schools for nearly five years rather than desegregate.

In January 2021, Petersen announced he would propose an amendment to the Virginia state budget to require schools receiving state funding to allow in-person learning. Petersen proposed the amendment in spite of the Fairfax County Democratic Committee voting with 98% support of a resolution asking "state legislators to refrain from coercing the FCPS school board to change their school reopening plan by threatening to cut their budget."

== Personal career ==
=== Defense attorney for Advanced Towing ===
On June 25, 2020, Attorney General Mark R. Herring filed a lawsuit against Advanced Towing Company, LLC, a towing and recovery operator based in Arlington, Virginia. The Complaint alleges that Advanced Towing has violated Virginia and Arlington County towing code provisions, resulting in towing conduct that is “frequently predatory, aggressive, overreaching and illegal.” Petersen represented Advanced Towing in the case.

Advanced Towing had been known in Arlington Virginia for being extremely aggressive with their towing procedures and had been accused of illegal practices for many years, including towing cars with children inside and damaging towed vehicles. In 2015 they made the news for an incident involving ESPN's Britt McHenry.

The outcome of the case resulted in $750 in civil penalties and did not award restitution to consumers. The prosecution had depended on "the victims of Advanced’s dangerous towing practices who voluntarily testified in court to tell their story. Advanced Towing has employed predatory and illegal towing practices for years, costing Virginia consumers hundreds, if not thousands of dollars, and it deserves to be held accountable for its actions."

In the ruling, the Judge William Newman, “Although the Defendant’s conduct is sanctionable, the Court is constrained by the remedies available in both the Virginia and Arlington County Code." The court found there were “deficiencies” in Advanced Towing’s business practices and record keeping, the court “does not find evidence to issue a permanent injunction against Defendant.”

Petersen argued that “the office of the Attorney General wants to put my client out of business.” and said the ruling largely vindicates the company and owner John O’Neill. Petersen said the AG’s office did not provide enough evidence that Advanced Towing did anything illegal and called the lawsuit “overkill.”

== Sources ==
- "Past member search; J. Chapman Petersen". Virginia House of Delegates. Archived from the original on 2011-05-24.
- "Chap Petersen; State Senator; 34th District, Virginia". (Constituent/campaign website)
- "Election Results". Virginia State Board of Elections. Archived from the original on 2010-06-17.

Virginia House of Delegates
Preceded by Jack Rust	Member from the 37th district 2002–2006	Succeeded by David Bulova
Senate of Virginia
Preceded by Jeannemarie Devolites Davis	Member from the 34th district 2008–2024	Succeeded by Scott Surovell
