= English First (lobbying organization) =

English First is a lobbying organization for the English-only movement in the United States founded in Springfield, Virginia in 1986 by Larry Pratt.

The organization's web site shut down in March 2021.

== See also ==
- Federation for American Immigration Reform
- English Plus
