= Jack Rust =

American lawyer and politician

Member of the Virginia House of Delegates from the 37th district
- In office January 3, 1997 – January 9, 2002
- Preceded by: Bob Harris
- Succeeded by: Chap Petersen

Member of the Virginia House of Delegates from the 50th district
- In office January 13, 1982 – January 12, 1983 Serving with Dorothy McDiarmid & Ken Plum
- Preceded by: Dick Bagley; John D. Gray
- Succeeded by: Harry J. Parrish

Member of the Virginia House of Delegates from the 18th district
- In office January 9, 1980 – January 13, 1982 Serving with Vince Callahan, Martin Perper, Dorothy McDiarmid, & John Buckley
- Preceded by: Ken Plum
- Succeeded by: Andy Guest

Personal details
- Born: John Howson Rust Jr. May 21, 1947 Washington, D.C., U.S.
- Died: December 30, 2021 (aged 74) Fairfax, Virginia, U.S.
- Party: Republican
- Education: University of Virginia

Military service
- Allegiance: United States
- Branch/service: United States Army
- Years of service: 1972–1974

John Howson Rust Jr. (May 21, 1947 – December 30, 2021) was an American lawyer and politician from Fairfax County, Virginia, who twice served in the Virginia General Assembly and as Fairfax County's Commissioner of Accounts.

== Early life and education ==
Although born in a hospital in Washington, D.C., in 1947, and was a lifelong Fairfax County resident. His parents were Jean Johnson and John H. Rust Three generations of his family practiced law in northern Virginia, and his father served as Fairfax's mayor as well as a delegate to Virginia's 1956 Constitutional Convention, and his grandfather, also John W. Rust, served in the Senate of Virginia.

Rust attended grammar school during massive resistance and graduated from Fairfax High School after its integration. He attended the University of Virginia, receiving a bachelor's degree in 1969 and 1972 a J.D. degree from its law school. While there, he served on the board of editors of the Virginia Law Review and won election to the Order of the Coif. Following graduation and during the Vietnam War, Rust served in the U.S. Army.

== Career ==
Following his admission to the Virginia Bar and military service, Rust worked as a lawyer in Fairfax in the family law firm, Rust & Rust, which in 1982 merged with another law firm to become McCandlish, Lillard, Rust & Church. From 1974 to 1978, Rust was the Fairfax city attorney. He also served as counsel to the Fairfax School Board.

=== Virginia delegate ===
Rust first became one of Fairfax County's delegates in the Virginia House of Delegates (a part-time position) in 1979 (to what was then the 18th House of Delegates district), and won re-election in 1981 (to what became the 50th House of Delegates district) and thus served from 1980 to 1982. However, his second re-election attempt failed when Rust narrowly lost to Stephen E. Gordy in the Republican Party primary in what had become the 37th Virginia House of Delegates district following court-required adoption of single-member districts.

Rust won a special election for the 37th district seat in 1996, and then a full two-year term in November 1997. Rust retained his seat in the 1999 elections, having been named Legislator of the Year by the Virginia Treasurers' Association, Tech Ten Legislator and Business Leader of the Year (all three in 1998) as well as Fairfax County Chamber of Commerce Chamber Champion (1999). Following the 2000 United States census, Rust helped redraw electoral boundaries. Nonetheless, Rust lost his seat in the next election, defeated by Democrat Chap Petersen in 2001, and again in the 2003 election rematch.

=== Commissioner of Accounts ===
Appointed Commissioner of Accounts for the 19th Judicial Circuit in February 2006. Rust's legal practice included estate administration services, the preparation of income and estate tax returns; and trust administration services, including maintenance, investment, and distribution of trust accounts. He also provided estate planning services, including tax planning and the preparation of wills and trusts. A member of the Fairfax, Virginia and American Bar Associations, the Virginia State Bar, and the Virginia Trial Lawyers Association, Rust is qualified to practice before the United States Supreme Court, the United States Court of Appeals for the Fourth Circuit, the United States District Court for the Eastern District of Virginia, the United States Bankruptcy Courts for the Eastern and Western Districts of Virginia and in all Virginia courts.

=== Virginia Resource Authority ===
Governor Robert McDonnell appointed Rust to the VRA Board in 2012. He served on the board's Portfolio Risk Management Committee and the Legislative Committee, as well as chaired the Strategic Planning Committee.

=== Cardinal Financial Corporation and Patriot Bankshares ===
After helping to found Cardinal Financial Corporation, Rust became its initial chairman of the board of directors and remained as a director (1997–2009), including time as the board's vice-chairman. Rust also was the founding chairman of First Patriot Bankshares Corporation and served on its board from 1987 to 1997.

== Personal life ==
Rust married the former Susan Mary Byrne in 1970. They had three sons, J.W., Tom and Bob.

== Death ==
Rust died in Fairfax, Virginia, on December 30, 2021, at age 74.
