= Saddam Azlan Salim =

Bangladeshi American politician (born 1990)

Saddam Salim
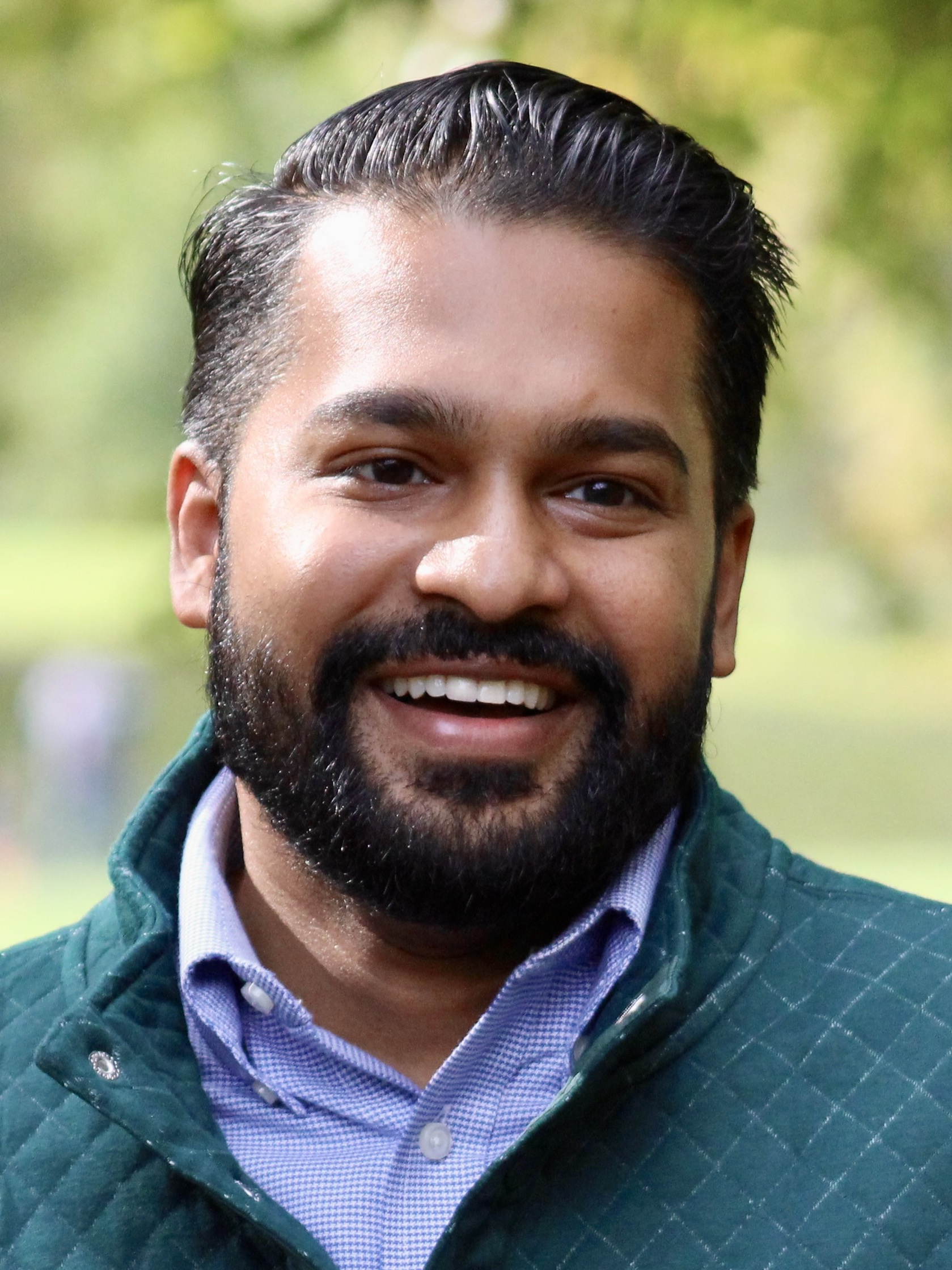
- Salim in 2023

Member of the Virginia Senate from the 37th district
- Incumbent
- Assumed office January 10, 2024
- Preceded by: Chap Petersen

Personal details
- Born: January 1, 1990 (age 36) Noakhali, Bangladesh
- Party: Democratic
- Education: Northern Virginia Community College (AS); George Mason University (BS, MPA)
- Website: Campaign website

Saddam Azlan Salim (born January 1, 1990) is an American politician representing Virginia's 37th Senate district, which includes the cities of Fairfax and Falls Church, as well as portions of Fairfax County. A member of the Democratic Party, he immigrated to the United States from Bangladesh as a child in 2000, after his family was displaced by flooding. He was elected to the Virginia Senate in 2023, after successfully primarying incumbent Democrat Chap Petersen.

== Early life and education ==
Saddam was born in Noakhali, Bangladesh on January 1, 1990. His family immigrated to the United States in 2000 after they were displaced by flooding in 1998. He graduated from Falls Church High School. He earned an associate's degree from Northern Virginia Community College in 2010, graduated with a bachelor's degree in public administration from George Mason University in 2012, and a master's degree in public administration from George Mason University in 2015. Prior to his political career, he worked as a financial consultant.

During the 2020 United States presidential election, he co-founded the campaign group South Asians for Biden.

== Virginia State Senate ==
=== 2023 ===
Salim announced his candidacy in 2023 against incumbent Democrat Chap Petersen, who represented the 34th District which had been redistricted to the 37th, since 2011. On June 21, Salim pulled an upset, defeating Petersen with 54.1% of the vote.

On November 7, Salim defeated Republican Ken Reid with 68.7% of the vote.

=== Tenure ===
In 2024, he introduced legislation to legalize accessory dwelling units; it passed into law in April 2026. In 2026, he introduced legislation to ban the sale of assault weapons and high-capacity magazines. In 2026, Salim sponsored a bill that would have prevented Immigration and Customs Enforcement officers from wearing masks to conceal their identities. It passed into law but was blocked by district judge Robert E. Payne.

== Personal life ==
Salim is Muslim.

== Electoral history ==
Democratic Primary for the 37th Senate District, 2023
Party	Candidate	Votes	%
Democratic	Saddam Salim	10,477	54.1
Democratic	Chap Petersen	8,880	45.9

Election to the Virginia State Senate 37th District, 2023
Party	Candidate	Votes	%
Democratic	Saddam Salim	40,947	68.7
Republican	Ken Reid	18,427	30.9
