= Robert E. Harris =

American politician (1935–1996)

Member of the Virginia House of Delegates
- In office January 9, 1974 – November 29, 1996
- Preceded by: Warren J. Davis
- Succeeded by: Jack Rust
- Constituency: 19th district (1974–1982); 51st district (1982–1983); 40th district (1983–1992); 37th district (1992–1996)

Personal details
- Born: December 18, 1935 Joplin, Missouri, U.S.
- Died: November 29, 1996 (aged 60) Fairfax, Virginia, U.S.
- Party: Republican
- Education: George Washington University (BA); USA Nuclear Reactor Engineering School

Military service
- Service: Army Nuclear Power Program

Robert E. Harris (December 18, 1935 – November 29, 1996) is an American politician who was a Republican in the Virginia House of Delegates.

== Biography ==
Harris was born to an Episcopalian family on December 18, 1935, in Joplin, Missouri, and later moved to Fairfax, Virginia. He graduated from George Washington University with a BA, and later graduated from the USA Nuclear Reactor Engineering School. He served as a member of the Army Nuclear Power Program for 5.5 years.

Harris began his political career as a Republican in the Virginia House of Delegates in 1974 from Virginia's 8th congressional district after winning the Republican nomination against John F. Herrity. He served until his death in office on November 29, 1996, of leukemia, at the age of 60. He was buried on December 2. Fairfax City Democratic chairman Austin Morrill posthumously accused Harris of misleading Democrats into thinking he was recovering, as he wrote a letter saying he was.
