= Executive Order 14224 =

U.S. executive order by Donald Trump

- Designating English as the Official Language of the United States
- Type: Executive order
- Number: 14224
- President: Donald Trump
- Signed: March 1, 2025

Federal Register details
- Federal Register document number: 2025-03694
- Publication date: March 6, 2025
- Document citation: 90 FR 11363

Summary
- This executive order declares English the official language of the United States and ends the requirement for federal agency heads to make foreign language accommodations.

Executive Order 14224, titled Designating English as the Official Language of the United States, is an executive order signed by Donald Trump on March 1, 2025, declaring English the official language of the United States for federal agencies.

This designation is an executive action directed at federal agencies and is not a federal statute, which would require an act of Congress. As such, the order does not make English the official language of the country, only making the language official within the federal executive branch. It repeals Executive Order 13166, ending the requirement for federal agency heads to make foreign language accommodations. Still, agencies are not prohibited from using languages other than English.

== Changes to federal guidance on non-English accommodations ==
EO 14224 repeals Executive Order 13166, issued by President Bill Clinton on August 11, 2000. The Clinton order required agencies of the federal government to make plans to implement Department of Justice guidance ensuring people with limited English proficiency would have improved access to federal services on a non-discriminatory basis, to the degree needed and without an undue burden on the agencies. The Trump order instructed agency heads to make accommodations as they "deem necessary to fulfill their respective agencies' mission"; agencies are not prohibited from using other languages.

== Legal authority ==
The U.S. Congress has never passed legislation designating an official language at the federal level, and the U.S. Constitution does not specify an official language. The most recent legislative attempt was the 2006 Inhofe Amendment, which would have declared English the "national language". Although the amendment passed in the U.S. Senate, it failed to win enough votes in the U.S. House of Representatives. Law professor Ofer Raban wrote that in the absence of a congressionally approved law, with this order the President "appears to rely on his constitutional authority (including his authority over federal executive agencies)".

== See also ==
- English-only movement
- List of countries and territories where English is an official language
- List of executive orders in the second presidency of Donald Trump
- Official language
