= Terry Austin (politician) =

American politician (born 1955)

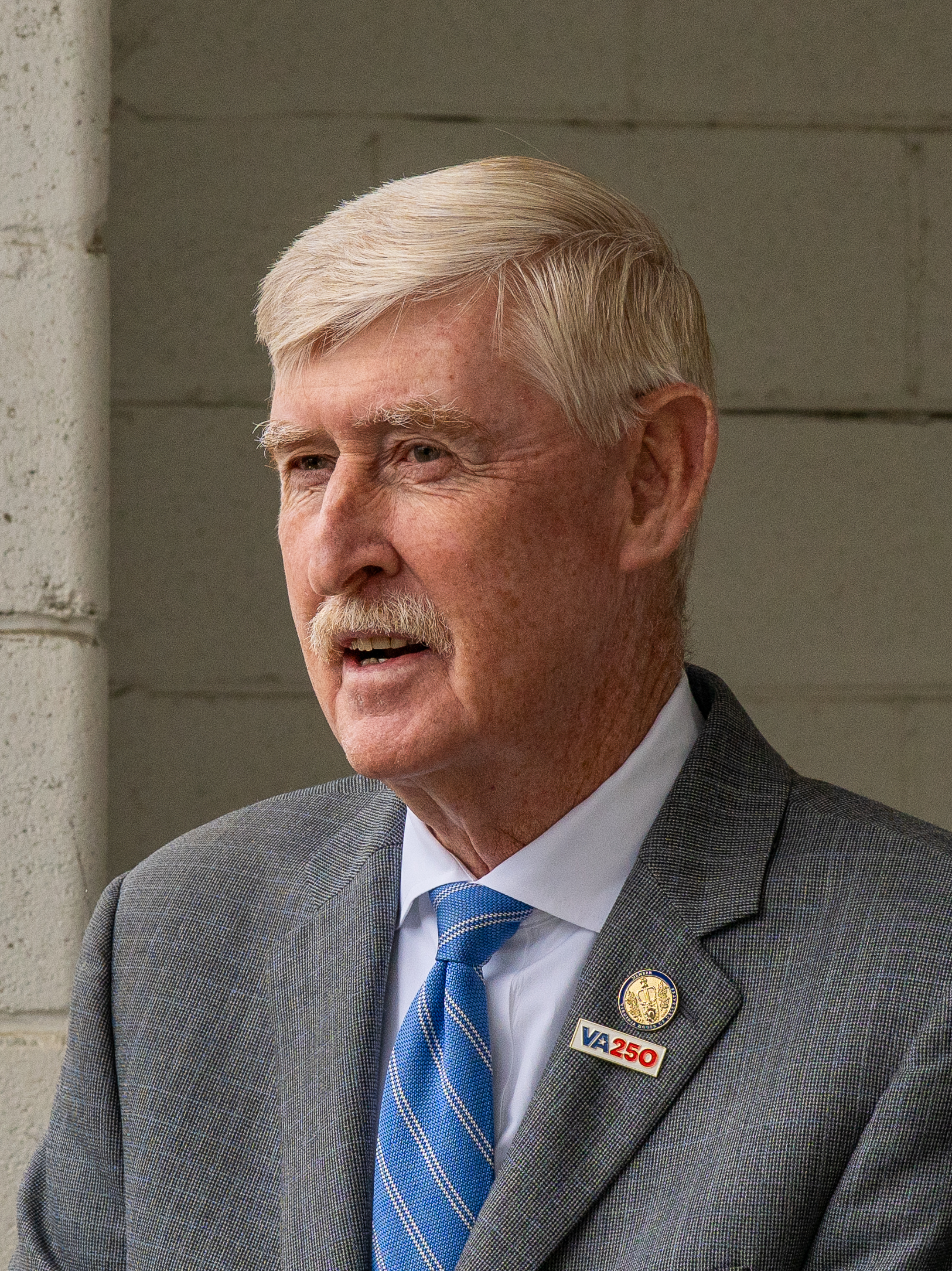
- Austin in 2025

Member of the Virginia House of Delegates
- Incumbent
- Assumed office January 8, 2014
- Preceded by: Lacey Putney
- Constituency: 19th district (2014–2024); 37th district (2024–present)

Personal details
- Born: October 16, 1955 (age 70) Roanoke, Virginia, U.S.
- Party: Republican
- Education: Virginia Western Community College
- Profession: Businessperson

Terry L. Austin (born October 16, 1955) is an American politician from Buchanan, Virginia. A member of the Republican Party, Austin is a member of the Virginia House of Delegates and represented the 19th District until redistricting. Since January 10, 2024, he has represented the 37th district. District 37 represents Botetourt County, Alleghany County, Craig County, and Rockbridge County, as well as the independent cities of Covington, Lexington, and Buena Vista. He previously served on the Botetourt County Board of Supervisors.

In 2022, Austin was promoted to chair of the Transportation Committee.
