= English Plus =

Political movement in the United States

English Plus is an American language plurality movement formed in reaction to the English-only movement. The intent was to promote greater acceptance of language diversity in the United States in order to encourage a broader American cultural development and more international perspectives. This would be achieved by encouraging education in English as well as secondary languages across the entire population, for immigrants and natives alike. This movement has been supported by language education professionals and minority language advocacy groups.

"English Plus" resolutions have been passed in the U.S. states of New Mexico, Oregon, Rhode Island, and Washington.

== History ==
The term "English Plus" originated in a 1985 letter to then-Secretary of Education William Bennett from the Spanish American League Against Discrimination.

We fear that Secretary Bennett has lost sight of the fact that English is a key to equal educational opportunity, necessary but not sufficient. English by itself is not enough. Not English Only, English Plus! ... Bennett is wrong. We won't accept English Only for our children. We want English plus. English plus math. Plus science. Plus social studies. Plus equal educational opportunities. English plus competence in the home language. Tell Bennett to enforce bilingual education and civil rights laws you enacted, or tell the President he cannot do his job. English Plus for everyone!

== See also ==
- Seal of Biliteracy
