= Executive Order 13166 =

2000 United States executive order

On August 11, 2000, United States President Bill Clinton signed Executive Order 13166, "Improving Access to Services for Persons with Limited English proficiency". The Executive Order required federal agencies to examine the services they provide, identify any need for services to those with limited English proficiency (LEP), and develop and implement a system to provide those services so LEP persons can have meaningful access to them. It is expected that agency plans will provide for such meaningful access consistent with, and without unduly burdening, the fundamental mission of the agency. The Executive Order also required that the Federal agencies work to ensure that recipients of Federal financial assistance provide meaningful access to their LEP applicants and beneficiaries.

To assist Federal agencies in carrying out these responsibilities, the U.S. Department of Justice issued LEP Guidance that set forth the compliance standards that recipients of Federal financial assistance had to follow to ensure that their programs and activities normally provided in English were accessible to LEP persons and thus did not discriminate on the basis of national origin in violation of Title VI's prohibition against national origin discrimination.

The order was revoked by President Donald Trump on March 1, 2025 by Executive Order 14224.

== See also ==
- Languages of the United States
- Language politics
- Civil Rights
- Civil Rights Act of 1964
- Cultural competence
- Immigration to the United States
- Multiculturalism
- Language interpretation
- Translation
