= Martin H. Perper =

American politician (1939–1999)

Martin Perper

Member of the Virginia House of Delegates from the 18th district
- In office January 11, 1978 – January 13, 1982
- Preceded by: Wyatt Durrette
- Succeeded by: Andy Guest

Personal details
- Born: Martin Howard Perper; August 6, 1939 Philadelphia, Pennsylvania
- Died: November 21, 1999 (aged 60) Falls Church, Virginia
- Party: Republican
- Spouse(s): Ellen; Monica; Freda Smith
- Education: George Washington University

Martin Howard Perper (August 6, 1939 – November 21, 1999) was an American politician who served two terms as a Republican member of the Virginia House of Delegates. In 1976, he ran for the United States Senate as an Independent Republican.
