= Virginia's 37th House of Delegates district =

Virginia legislative district

Virginia's {{{district}}}th House of Delegates district
- District map following the 2021 redistricting
- Delegate: Terry L. Austin
- Demographics: 88% White; 4% Black/African American; 1% Asian; 3% Hispanic
- Population: 86,362
- Registered voters: 65,324

Virginia's 37th House of Delegates district elects one of the 100 members of the Virginia House of Delegates, which is the lower house of the state's bicameral legislature. The seat is currently held by Terry Austin. District 37 represents Botetourt County, Alleghany County, Craig County, and Rockbridge County, as well as the independent cities of Covington, Lexington, and Buena Vista.

Following the 2021 Virginia redistricting, the district was formed from parts of the 8th, 17th, 19th, and 24th Virginia House of Delegates districts.

== District officeholders ==
Years	Delegate	Party	Electoral history
January 12, 1983 – January 13, 1988	Stephen E. Gordy	Republican	Declined to seek reelection
January 13, 1988 – January 8, 1992	Jane Woods	Republican	Declined to seek reelection; Elected to the Senate of Virginia
January 8, 1992 – November 29, 1996	Bob Harris	Republican	Died in office
January 3, 1997 – January 9, 2002	Jack Rust	Republican	Lost reelection
January 9, 2002 – January 11, 2006	Chap Petersen	Democratic	Declined to seek reelection; Elected to the Senate of Virginia
January 11, 2006 – January 2024	David Bulova	Democratic	First elected in 2005
January 2024 – present	Terry Austin	Republican	First elected in 2013
