= 2012 Puerto Rico Republican presidential primary =

- March 18, 2012
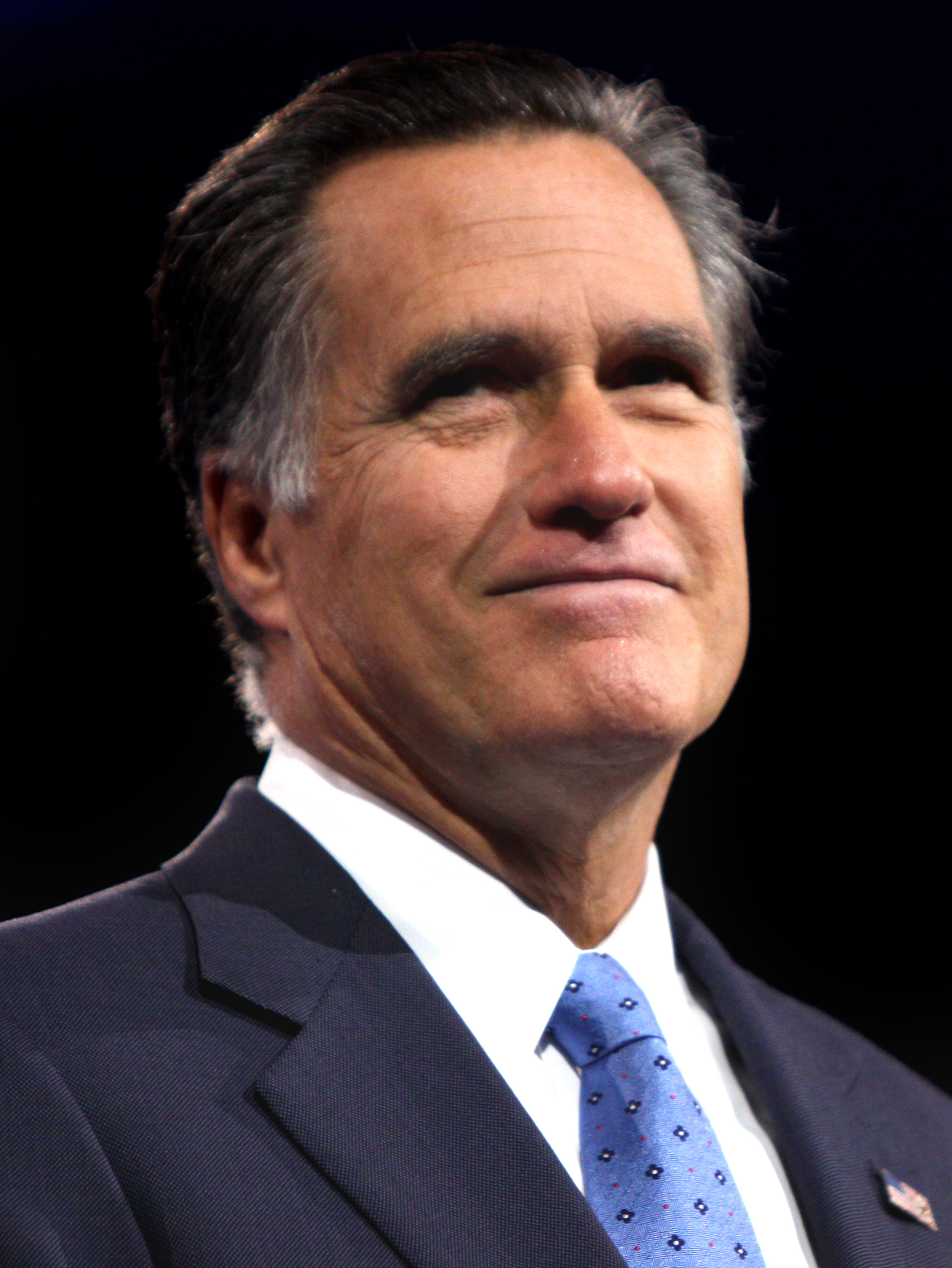

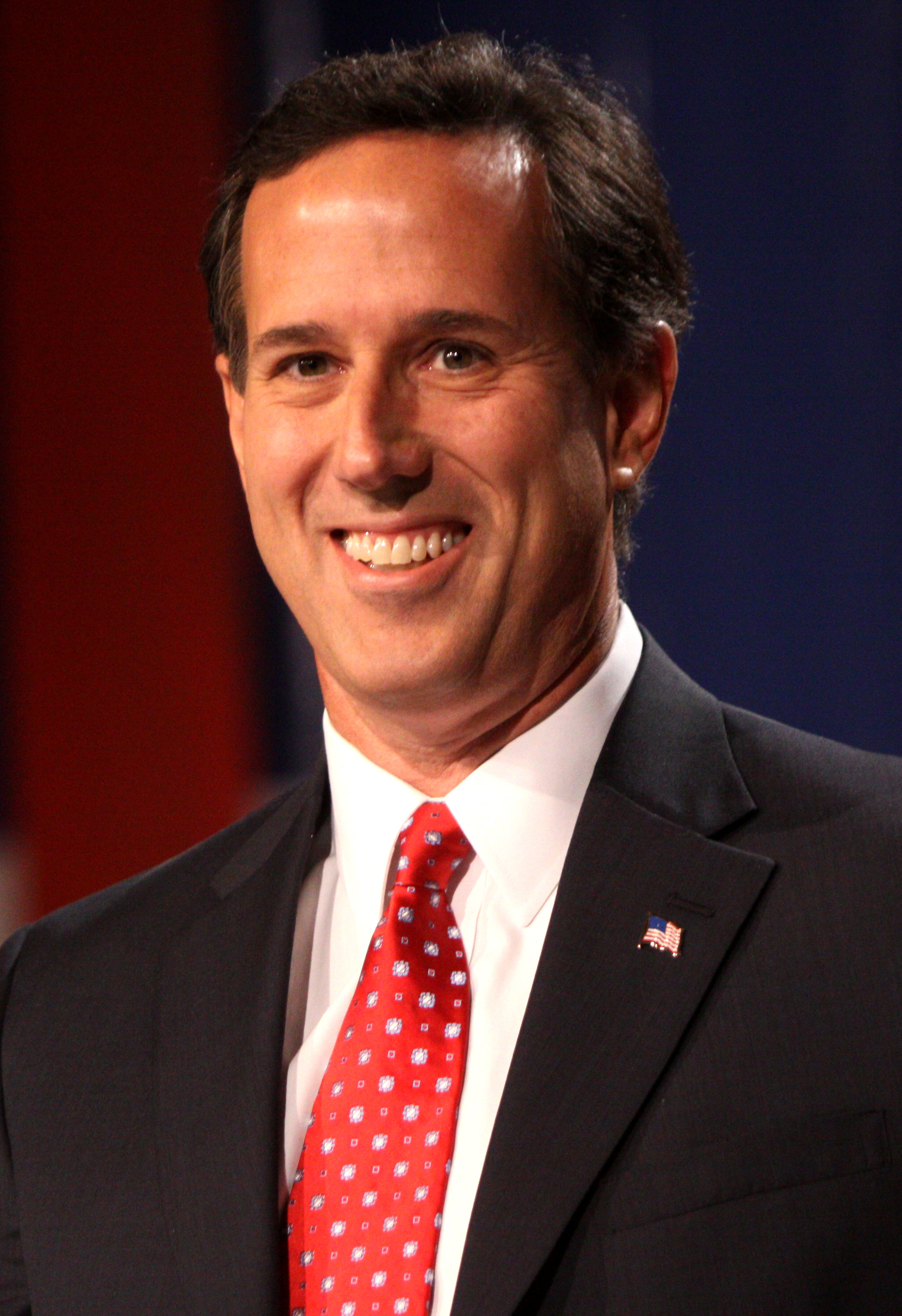
Candidate	Mitt Romney	Rick Santorum
Party	Republican	Republican
Home state	Massachusetts	Pennsylvania
Delegate count	20	0
Popular vote	106,431	10,574
Percentage	82.61%	8.21%

The 2012 Puerto Rico Republican presidential primary took place on March 18, 2012.

On January 18, 2012, Secretary of State Kenneth McClintock announced that seven candidates, including Newt Gingrich, Mitt Romney, Rick Santorum, Ron Paul and Rick Perry (who has since withdrawn and endorsed Gingrich) would be eligible to appear on the March 18 ballot unless they notified McClintock by February 17 of their desire not to compete in Puerto Rico. If a candidate received a majority of the votes, then the primary was to be winner-take-all, but if no candidate met the 50% threshold, its 20 delegates were to be divided proportionally.

On February 20, 2012, the Republican Party of Puerto Rico announced the six candidate names and their order on the ballot for the island's March 18 presidential primary.

== Results ==
Prior to certification:

Puerto Rico Republican primary, 2012
Candidate	Votes	Percentage	Delegates
Mitt Romney	106,431	82.61%	20
Rick Santorum	10,574	8.21%	0
Buddy Roemer	2,880	2.24%	0
Others	2,759	2.14%	0
Newt Gingrich	2,702	2.10%	0
Fred Karger	1,893	1.47%	0
Ron Paul	1,595	1.24%	0
Unprojected delegates:			3
Total:	128,834	100.0%	23

== Controversies ==
=== Santorum remarks about use of English in Puerto Rico ===
In 2012 U.S. presidential candidate Rick Santorum was criticized during the runup to the Puerto Rican Republican primary for stating that if Puerto Rico opted to become a state, it would have to make English its primary language. As The New York Times reported:

His remarks drew immediate criticism, and prompted one delegate who had been pledged to him to quit, saying he was offended. There is no rule in the Constitution requiring the adoption of English for the admittance of new states, and the United States does not have an official language. On Thursday Mr. Santorum and his aides scrambled to contain the damage, with the candidate saying several times that the local media had misquoted him as saying he wanted English to be the "only" language, whereas he believed that English should be the "primary language.

== See also ==
- Republican Party presidential primaries, 2012
- Results of the 2012 Republican Party presidential primaries
- Puerto Rico Republican Party
