= 1994 Virginia ballot measures =

The 1994 Virginia State Elections took place on Election Day, November 8, 1994, the same day as the U.S. Senate and U.S. House elections in the state. The only statewide elections on the ballot were three constitutional referendums to amend the Virginia State Constitution. Because Virginia state elections are held on off-years, no statewide officers or state legislative elections were held. All referendums were referred to the voters by the Virginia General Assembly.

== Question 1 ==
This amendment asked voters to extend the statutory time period for bringing civil lawsuits which involve intentional injuries to minors.

Question 1
Choice	Votes	%
For	1,144,839	65.16
Against	612,054	34.84
Total	1,756,893	100.00
Source: - Official Results

== Question 2 ==
This amendment asked voters to remove the requirement that Virginia citizens must register to vote in-person and permits voter registration by mail. This amendment also removed the requirement that prevented citizens from cancelling their voter registration if they had voted in the past 4 years.

Question 2
Choice	Votes	%
For	919,058	52.66
Against	826,363	47.34
Total	1,745,421	100.00
Source: - Official Results

== Question 3 ==
This amendment asked voters to allow the Governor of Virginia to use line-item vetoes for bills passed by the Virginia General Assembly.

Question 3
Choice	Votes	%
For	926,681	55.68
Against	737,661	44.32
Total	1,664,342	100.00
Source: - Official Results
