= Virginia's 19th House of Delegates district =

Virginia legislative district

Virginia's 19th State House of Delegates district
- District map from the 2023 election
Delegate
Rozia Henson; D–Woodbridge
- Demographics: 27% White; 25% Black; 32% Hispanic; 9% Asian; 0% Native American; 0% Hawaiian/Pacific Islander; 1% Other; 6% Multiracial
- Population (2024) • Voting age: 89,772; 18
- Registered voters: 51,207

Virginia's 19th House of Delegates district elects one of 100 seats in the Virginia House of Delegates, the lower house of the state's bicameral legislature. District 19 represents parts of Fairfax County and Prince William County. The seat is currently held by Democrat Rozia Henson.

== District officeholders ==
Years	Delegate	Party	Electoral history
January 12, 1983 – January 8, 2014	Lacey E. Putney	Independent	Retired
January 8, 2014 – 2023	Terry Austin	Republican	First elected in 2013. Redistricted to the 37th District
2024 – present	Rozia Henson	Democratic	First elected in 2023
