= Lohre =

Lohre or Løhre is a surname. Notable people with the surname include:

- Günther Lohre (1953–2019), German athlete
- Julie Lohre (born 1974), American fitness competitor
- Olaf Løhre (1877–1957), Norwegian politician

== See also ==
- Loher (disambiguation)
- Lohr (surname)
