= Lohr (surname) =

Lohr is a surname. Notable people with the surname include:

- Aaron Lohr (born 1976), American actor
- August Lohr (1842–1920), Austrian painter
- Bob Lohr (born 1960), American golfer
- David Lohr, (born 1974), American writer
- Damian Lohr, (born 1993), German politician (AfD)
- Ellen Lohr (born 1965), German race driver
- Eric Lohr, American historian
- Howard Lohr (1892-1977), American baseball player
- Ina Lohr (1903–1983), Swiss composer
- Jerry Lohr (born 1937), American real estate developer
- Jim Lohr (1934–2017), American football player
- John Lohr (born 1961), Canadian politician
- Lenox R. Lohr (1891–1968), American businessman
- Marie Lohr (1890-1975), Australian actress
- Matt Lohr (born 1971), American politician
- Michael F. Lohr (born 1952), American Navy admiral
- Rob Lohr (born 1990), American football player
- Sharon Lohr, American statistician

== See also ==
- Loher (disambiguation)
- Lohr (disambiguation)
- Löhr, a surname
