= Löhr =

Löhr is a German surname. Notable people with the surname include:

- Adolf Löhr (1889–1978), German writer and bookseller
- Alexander Löhr (1885–1947), Austrian Luftwaffe commander
- Dieter Löhr (born 1936), German fencer and Olympics competitor
- George Augustus Löhr (1821–1897), English organist and composer; father of Richard Harvey Löhr
- Richard Harvey Löhr (1856–1927), English composer; son of George Augustus Löhr
- Hannes Löhr (1942–2016), German footballer and manager
- Hermann Löhr (1871–1943), English composer; son of Frederic Nicholls Löhr
- Frederic Nicholls Löhr (1844–1888), English composer; father of Hermann Löhr

== Other ==
- Löhr Delta, 1970s Austrian delta-wing aircraft

== See also ==
- Loehr (surname)
- Loher (disambiguation)
- Lohr (disambiguation)
