= Lohr =

Lohr or Löhr may refer to:

Geography

- Lohr am Main, town in the Main-Spessart county, Bavaria, Germany
- Lohr, Bas-Rhin, village and commune in the Bas-Rhin département, France
- Lohr (river), river of Hesse and Bavaria, Germany

People

- Lohr (surname)
- Löhr (surname)

Other

- Lohr Industrie, French manufacturer

== See also ==
- Loehr (surname)
- Loher (disambiguation)
