= Dawson Dawson-Watson =

English painter

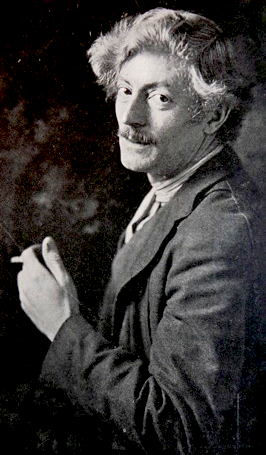
- Dawson-Watson c. 1905
- Born: June 21, 1864; St John's Wood, Middlesex, England
- Died: 1939 (age 75); San Antonio, Texas, United States
- Movement: Impressionism
- Spouse: Mary Hoyt Sellar
- Awards: Texas Wildflower Competitive Exhibition
- Patrons: San Antonio Artists League; Boston Arts & Crafts Guild; St. Louis Artist's Guild; St. Louis Junior Players; San Antonio Art Guild; 2x4 Society; Society of Western Artists; Boston Society of Arts & Crafts; St. Louis Art League

Signature
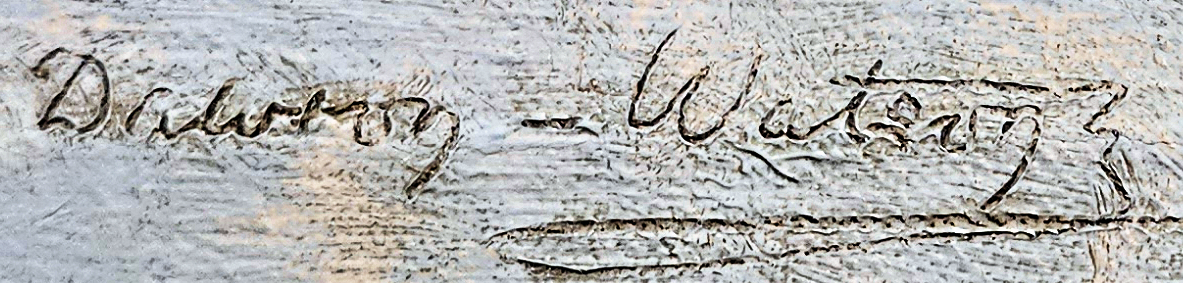

Dawson Dawson-Watson (1864–1939) was a British-born Impressionist painter who became famous in 1927 for winning the largest cash prize in American art, the Texas Wildflower Competitive Exhibition. He was one of the first members of the famous Impressionist colony in Giverny, France and was a prominent teacher in Hartford, Connecticut, St. Louis, Missouri and San Antonio, Texas.

Dawson-Watson was a versatile artist, and made significant contributions to the American Arts & Crafts Movement, first in Boston, Massachusetts and then in Woodstock, New York. His works are on display in the Witte Museum in San Antonio and at the San Antonio Art League.

== Childhood and studies ==
Dawson Dawson-Watson was born in the London suburb of St. John's Wood, then in Middlesex, on June 21, 1864. He came from an artistic family. His father John Dawson Watson (1832–1892) was a famous illustrator who did illustrations for Robinson Crusoe and Arabian Nights. His grandfather Dawson Watson was a talented amateur artist. His uncle Thomas J. Watson (1847–1912) was also a well recognized painter and his aunt was married to the Victorian painter Myles Birket Foster (1825–1899). Dawson-Watson grew up in St. John's Wood surrounded by artists, writers and figures from the British aesthetic movement. He was a child prodigy whose first work was accepted by the Royal Academy at the age of sixteen. His father and an American artist Mark Fisher (1841–1923) were his first teachers. A wealthy brewer from Manchester paid for his art studies in Paris, where he remained from 1886 to 1889. He worked under a number of prominent teachers including Carolus-Duran (1837–1917), Léon Glaize (1942-1932), Luc-Olivier Merson (1846–1920), Aimé Morot (1850–1913) and Raphaël Collin (1850–1916).

== The Impressionist Colony ==
The American painter John Leslie Breck (1860–1899), who was one of the first Americans to settle in Giverny with Louis Ritter (1852–1896), Willard Leroy Metcalf (1858–1925) Blair Bruce (1859–1906), Henry Fitch Taylor (1853–1925), Theodore Robinson (1852–1896) and Thedore Wendel (1859–1932), invited Dawson-Watson to live in Giverny, the spring after its founding. He first registered at the Baudy Cafe on May 12, 1888. In Giverny, Dawson-Watson did paintings that were said to be influenced by the subjects of the Barbizon School but with the palette of Impressionism. Dawson-Watson only had a "nodding acquaintance" with Claude Monet, who lived in Giverny and insisted that the original painters were not drawn to the village because they knew Monet lived there.

== The United States ==
Dawson Dawson-Watson and his family moved to the United States in 1893. They first stayed in Boston and then he took a position teaching art for the Hartford Art Association. His son, the artist Edward Dawson-Watson was born in Hartford in 1893 and his daughter Hilda Dawson Watson in 1895. During the time he lived in Hartford he exhibited in Boston and when he left the art association, he moved back to Boston where he became part of the Arts & Crafts colony in Scituate, Massachusetts. He collaborated with the artist Thomas Meteyard on a small publication titled the Courrier Innocent and was part of the Bohemian community. When his parents died, he received a small inheritance and moved back to England where he and his family lived for a number of years.

== Canada, Woodstock, St. Louis ==
The Dawson-Watson family returned to North America on June 9, 1901 and settled in Quebec, on the St. Lawrence River. He painted Impressionist paintings of the bluffs and river while he was in Quebec and was mentioned extensively in the 1906 book Quebec Sketch Book. In Quebec he grew to know the American Tonalist painter L. Birge Harrison (1854–1929), who was instrumental in his employment at Byrdcliffe, the famous utopian Arts & Crafts Colony in Woodstock, New York. At Byrdcliffe he taught students decorative design in the Byrdcliffe Summer School and designed Arts & Crafts furniture for the furniture company that the colony's founder Ralph Radcliffe Whitehead (1854–1929) had hoped would support the colony.

Dawson-Watson only taught for short time at Byrdcliffe and in 1904 he took a position in St. Louis. He taught at the St. Louis School of Fine Arts from 1904 to 1915.

== San Antonio ==
Dawson-Watson began spending time in San Antonio while he was still living in St. Louis. From 1914 to 1926 he spent part of each year in San Antonio, until finally becoming a full-time resident. From 1918-1919 he served as director for the San Antonio Art Guild. It is generally stated that it was the Edgar B. Davis Wildflower Competition that drew him to San Antonio permanently. In 1926 it was announced that the oilman Edgar B. Davis would sponsor an art competition that was intended to draw attention to the beauty of the Texas Hill Country. A jury selected paintings for an exhibition and there were categories for artists who were residents of Texas and those who came from outside of the state. The formal name of the contest, organized by the San Antonio Art League, was the Texas Wildflower Competitive Exhibition. In 1927 Dawson-Watson won the prize for artists who came from outside Texas and was awarded the $5,000 first prize for Glory of the Morning while his friend, Jose Apra, the Spanish painter won the prize for Texas residents. He went on to win first and fifth prizes in the 1929 competition. These awards not only gave Dawson-Watson great prestige in San Antonio, but national recognition and the financial awards made him comfortable for the first time in his life. Glory of the Morning was presented to the Lotos Club in New York by Edgar B. Davis. In San Antonio he became famous for his paintings of the many variety of Cacti that grow in the Texas Hill Country. In 1934, he was one of eight local artists commissioned by the Civil Works Administration to execute murals in San Antonio. He was a man of compassion as well as style, offering generous support to his adopted city when San Antonio suffered a devastating flood in 1921 and to the Witte Museum when it suffered a severe financial crisis in 1933. Dawson-Watson raised his children in San Antonio and remained a resident until his death in 1939.

== Studio locations ==
- Paris, France (1886–1888)
- Giverny, France (1888–1893)
- Hartford, Connecticut (1893–1896)
- Boston, Massachusetts (c. 1897)
- Acton, England (1898–1901)
- Byrdecliffe Colony, Woodstock, New York (1903–1904)
- Quebec City (c. 1901 – 1904)
- 3379 Windsor Place, St. Louis, Missouri (1910)
- 19th & Locust Street, St. Louis, Missouri (1914)
- 6029 Horton Place, St. Louis, Missouri (1920)
- San Antonio, Texas (1926–1939)
