= National Breast Cancer Foundation =

National Breast Cancer Foundation may refer to:

- National Breast Cancer Foundation (Australia)
- National Breast Cancer Foundation (United States)
