= J. Lohr Vineyards & Wines =

American winery located in California

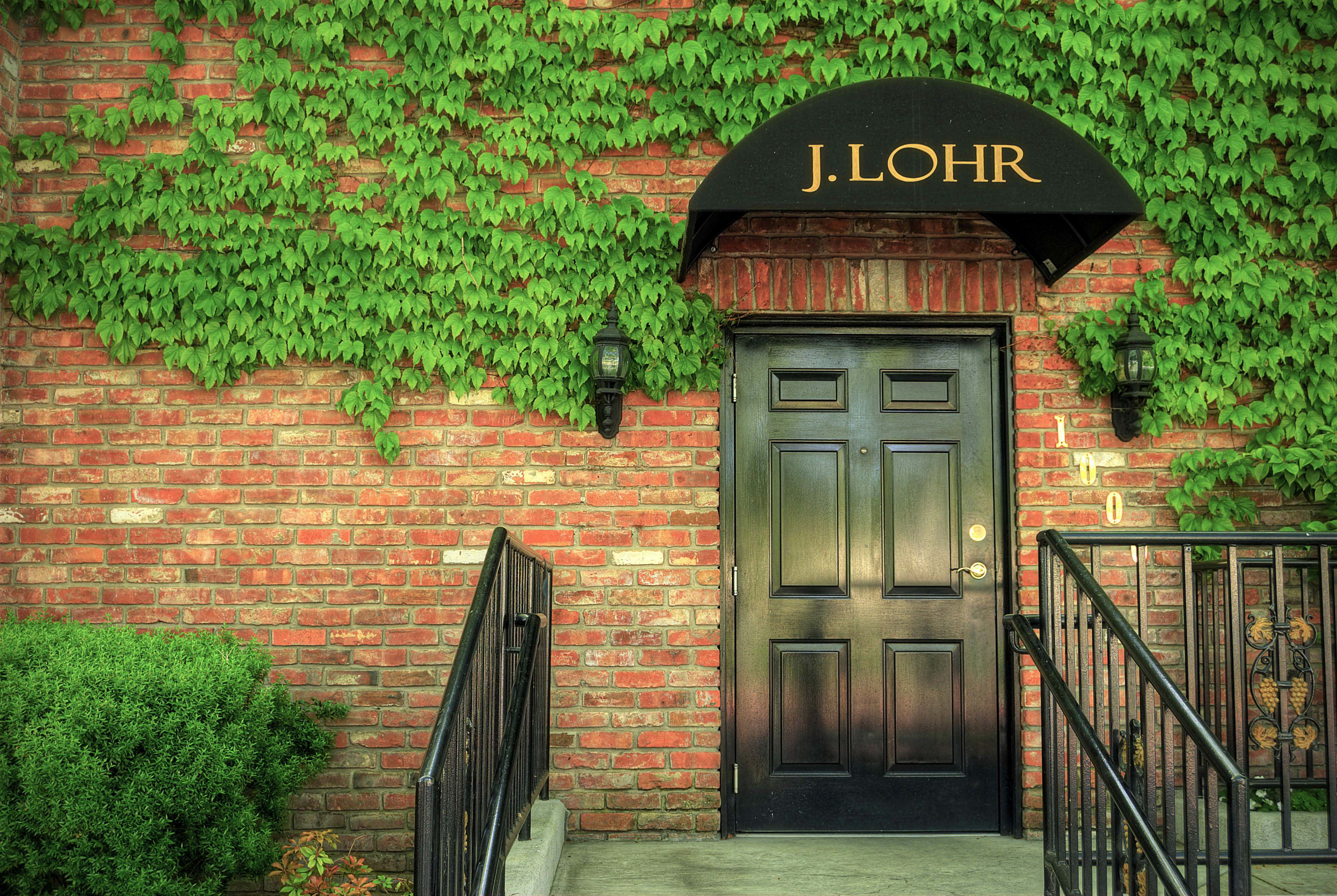
- Location: San Jose, California, United States
- Formerly: Turgeon & Lohr Winery
- First vines planted: 1972
- First vintage: 1974
- Key people: Jerry Lohr, founder; Steve Lohr, president & CEO; Cynthia Lohr, chief brand officer; Lawrence Lohr, chief operating officer, vineyards; Steve Peck, vice president, winemaking
- Area cultivated: 4,000
- Cases/yr: 1.8 million
- Known for: J. Lohr Signature Cabernet Sauvignon, J. Lohr Cuvée Series, J. Lohr Vineyard Series, J. Lohr Gesture, J. Lohr Pure Paso Proprietary Red Wine, J. Lohr Estates, J. Lohr Monterey Roots, ARIEL Vineyards
- Varietals: Cabernet Sauvignon, Chardonnay, Merlot, Pinot Noir, Sauvignon Blanc, Syrah, White Riesling, Valdiguié, Petit Verdot, Petite Sirah, Cabernet Franc, Malbec, Grenache Noir, Viognier, Roussanne, Mourvèdre, Grenache Blanc, Saint-Macaire
- Other products: Cypress Vineyards, Painter Bridge
- Distribution: International, domestic, winery exclusive, wine club
- Tasting: Open to the public and special events
- Website: www.jlohr.com

J. Lohr Vineyards & Wines is a winemaking company headquartered in San Jose, California, with over 4,000 acres of estate vineyards in the Paso Robles AVA in San Luis Obispo County, Arroyo Seco and Santa Lucia Highlands AVAs in Monterey County, and the St. Helena AVA in Napa Valley, California. The family-owned and operated company was founded by Jerry Lohr in 1974. The company operates wineries in San Jose, Paso Robles, and Greenfield, California. In 2013, Steve Lohr was appointed CEO of the company. J. Lohr Vineyards & Wines’ product portfolio includes eight tiers of wine: J. Lohr Signature, J. Lohr Cuvée Series, J. Lohr Vineyard Series, J. Lohr Gesture, J. Lohr Pure Paso Proprietary Red Wine, J. Lohr Monterey Roots, J. Lohr Estates and ARIEL Vineyards. The portfolio also includes specialty brands Cypress Vineyards and Painter Bridge. J. Lohr ranks among the top 25 wine producers in the United States, with annual US sales exceeding 1.8 million cases.

== History ==
=== 1972–1983: Early history ===
The Turgeon & Lohr Winery was founded in 1972 when Jerry Lohr and Bernard “Bernie” Turgeon broke ground on 280 acres in what would become the Arroyo Seco AVA in Monterey County. In 1974, Turgeon & Lohr Winery opened in San Jose, California, after taking over the closed Falstaff Brewery. Peter Stern, a winemaker from Napa Valley, joined the company in 1974. He designed the winery with stainless steel tanks, temperature control fermenters, and hundreds of 60-gallon oak barrels.

In 1975, the winery bottled and sold Chenin Blanc, a Rose of Cabernet Sauvignon, a Petite Sirah, and a proprietary blend called Jade. In 1976, the winery produced over 10,000 cases.

In 1976, Barry Gnekow joined J. Lohr Vineyards & Wines as an assistant winemaker. He later became Director of Winemaking in 1981 and went on to mentor Jeff Meier. Barry invented the patented double reverse osmosis process allowing the production of low and non-alcoholic wines. The process launched the ARIEL Vineyards brand of non-alcoholic wines. In 1979, J. Lohr achieved national distribution of its wines and furthered its distribution by producing three wines for the Hyatt Hotel Corporation beginning in 1983.

=== 1984-present: Expansion ===
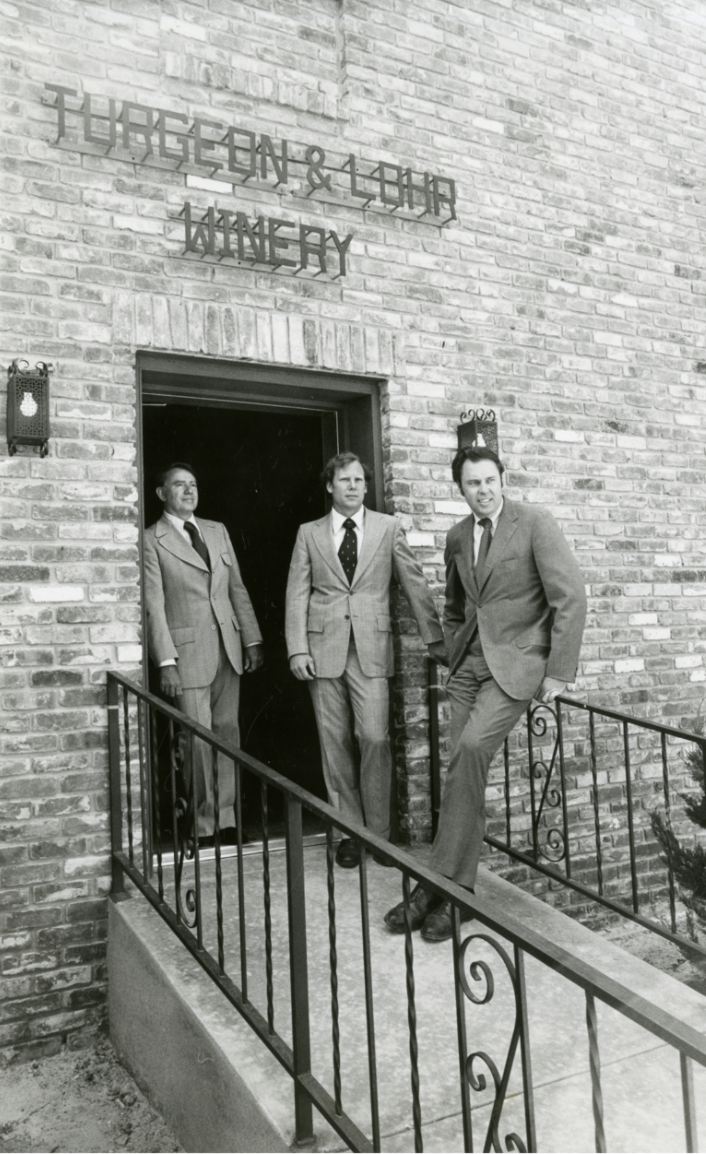
Turgeon & Lohr Winery

In 1984, Bernie retired and sold his shares of Turgeon & Lohr Winery to Jerry Lohr. The company was renamed to J. Lohr Vineyards & Wines. Jerry Lohr assumed the role of president upon Turgeon's retirement. Jeff Meier worked his first harvest at J. Lohr Vineyards & Wines in 1984. The company acquired a 35-acre vineyard in St. Helena in Napa Valley in the same year. In 1986, J. Lohr Vineyards & Wines planted Cabernet Sauvignon, Merlot, and other red wine grape varieties in the Paso Robles AVA in San Luis Obispo County, south of Monterey County. The company also began selling its wines internationally.

In 1987, J. Lohr Vineyards & Wines produced its first vintage of Seven Oaks Cabernet Sauvignon from Paso Robles. The first Riverstone Chardonnay was produced from J. Lohr's vineyards in the Arroyo Seco appellation of Monterey County, marking the debut of the J. Lohr Estates tier of wines. In 1989, the '88 Gamay was awarded "Best of Show" at the California State Fair.

J. Lohr Vineyards & Wines was producing 400,000 cases of wine by 1990. The first J. Lohr Vineyard Series wines were released in 1998: Arroyo Vista Chardonnay and Hilltop Cabernet Sauvignon. The Vineyard Series highlights small-lot winemaking from small growing sites. The J. Lohr Vineyards & Wines Paso Robles Wine Center opened in 2001. The J. Lohr Cuvée Series, with three distinct “Bordeaux-Inspired Blends,” was launched in 2002. J. Lohr Vineyard Series expanded in 2007 with five new wines and now encompasses eighteen wines. In 2008, J. Lohr Vineyards & Wines planted its first vineyards in the Santa Lucia Highlands AVA in Monterey County. In 2009, the company launched the J. Lohr Gesture tier, limited-release Rhône-style wines.

In 2013, Jeff Meier was named president and COO of J. Lohr Vineyards & Wines. Steve Peck joined the company in 2007 and then became Director of Winemaking in 2018. He was appointed vice president of Winemaking in 2022.

In 2020, J. Lohr Vineyards & Wines received the Green Medal Leader Award. The award was presented by the California Sustainable Winegrowing Alliance, California Association of Winegrape Growers, Wine Institute, Lodi Winegrape Commission, Napa Valley Vintners, Sonoma County Winegrowers, and the Vineyard Team.

In December 2021, Jeff Meier retired after thirty-seven years with the company.

In 2022, California Polytechnic State University San Luis Obispo opened the Justin and J. Lohr Center for Wine and Viticulture. The center includes the donor-funded 15,600 square-foot Lohr Family Winery building; a 15,600 square-foot research and teaching winery providing students access to crush, fermentation, barrel, sensory, bottling, enology and viticulture rooms.

In the same year, the winery was included in the Top 100 Wineries of 2022 by Wine & Spirits Magazine.

== J. Lohr family ==
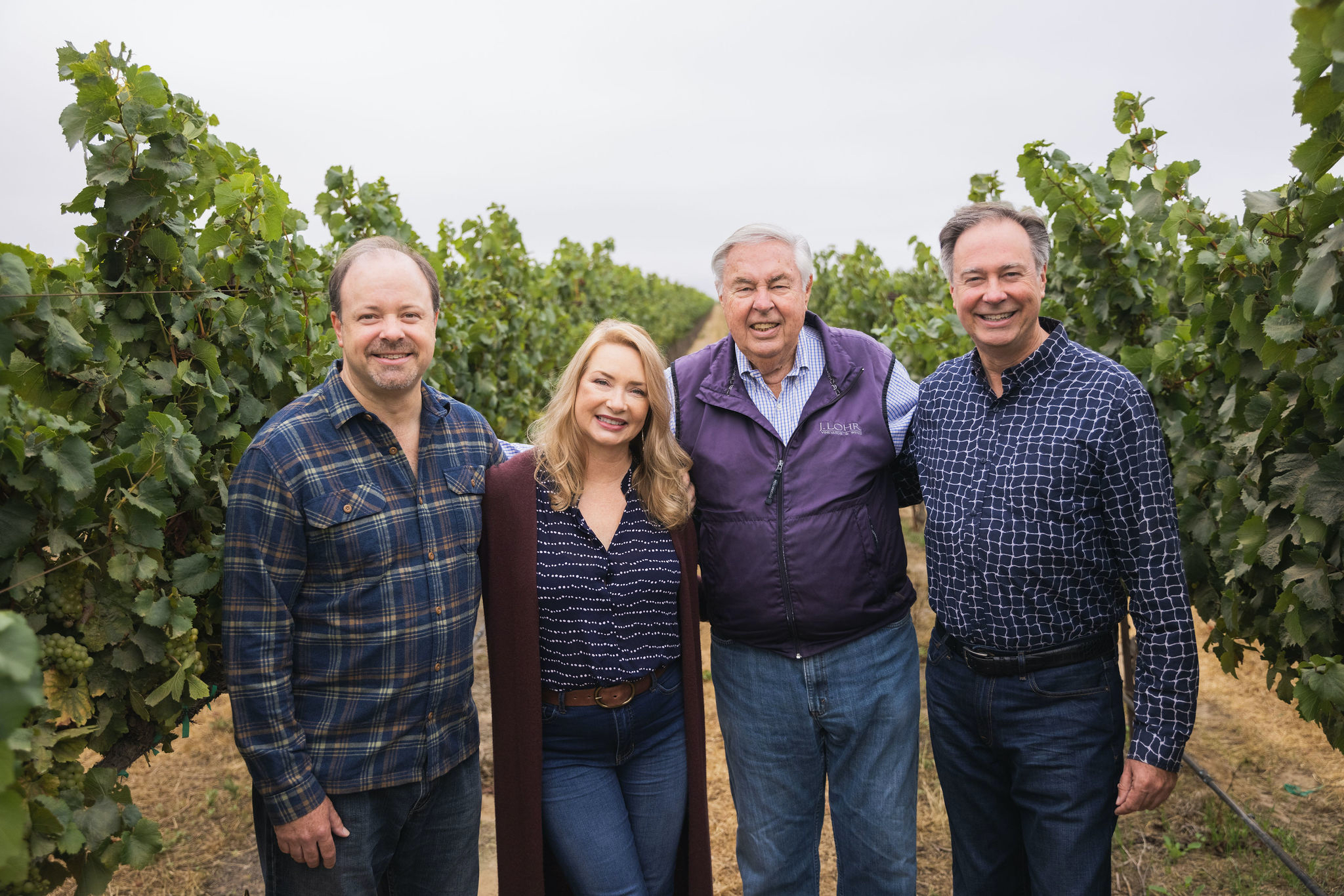
Lohr family

Jerry Lohr's children Steve, Cynthia, and Lawrence, are co-owners of J. Lohr Vineyards & Wines.

Jerry's son, Steve Lohr, joined the company as vice president for planning and development in 2003. In 2009, Steve was named executive vice president, COO. He became CEO in 2013. Steve was a three-term chairman of the Paso Robles Wine Country Alliance. Steve is a board member and former chairman of Wine Institute and is a board member and two-time chairman of the California Sustainable Winegrowing Alliance.

Jerry's daughter, Cynthia Lohr, joined the company in 2002 as Director of Communications. She became Vice President of Marketing in 2009. In 2016, she was appointed chief brand officer. Cynthia was appointed to UC Davis Dean's Advisory Council, is an advisor to National Breast Cancer Foundation, and is a former board vice president of the Paso Robles CAB Collective.

Jerry's youngest son, Lawrence Lohr, began working at the winery's warehouse with the winemaking production team. In 2009, he was named Director of Wine Education. In 2020, Lawrence was appointed chief operating officer, vineyards. Lawrence is a board member of the Wine Institute and the Monterey County Vintners & Growers Association.

== Viticulture ==
J. Lohr Vineyards & Wines farms four distinct American Viticultural Areas (AVAs) in California. The vineyard acreage totals more than 4,000 acres; the vineyards are planted in the Arroyo Seco AVA and Santa Lucia Highlands AVA in Monterey County, Paso Robles AVA in San Luis Obispo County, and the St. Helena appellation in Napa Valley.

Credited with being among the first to realize the potential of Monterey County for its soil and climate, Jerry Lohr chose the Arroyo Seco AVA for its gravelly loam and well-draining soil. The cool-climate vineyards experience maritime winds and fog from Monterey Bay, creating an excellent growing environment for producing Chardonnay, Pinot Noir, Riesling and Valdiguié. The company cultivates over 1,500 acres in the Arroyo Seco AVA and the Santa Lucia Highlands AVA.

The semi-arid climate makes for more extreme growing conditions in the Paso Robles AVA. The region experiences very warm days and cool nights, with daily temperature swings varying as much as 45 to 50 degrees during the growing season. The soil is variable and calcareous, with chalky limestone, sandy loams, and residual bedrock, making it well-draining and suited for Cabernet Sauvignon, Merlot and Syrah. The majority of J. Lohr Vineyards & Wines’ red wines are from estate grapes grown in Paso Robles. The company cultivates over 2,600 acres in the Paso Robles AVA. In the St. Helena appellation of Napa Valley, the Lohr family owns a 35-acre parcel of land called Carol's Vineyard, named after the late Carol Waldorf Lohr, wife of Founder Jerry Lohr for 48 years and mother to Steve, Cynthia, and Lawrence. The soil is clay and loam, with a climate that sees warm days with cool nights and marine influences from the San Francisco Bay. The vineyard is planted with Cabernet Sauvignon and Petit Verdot under the J. Lohr Carol's Vineyard label.

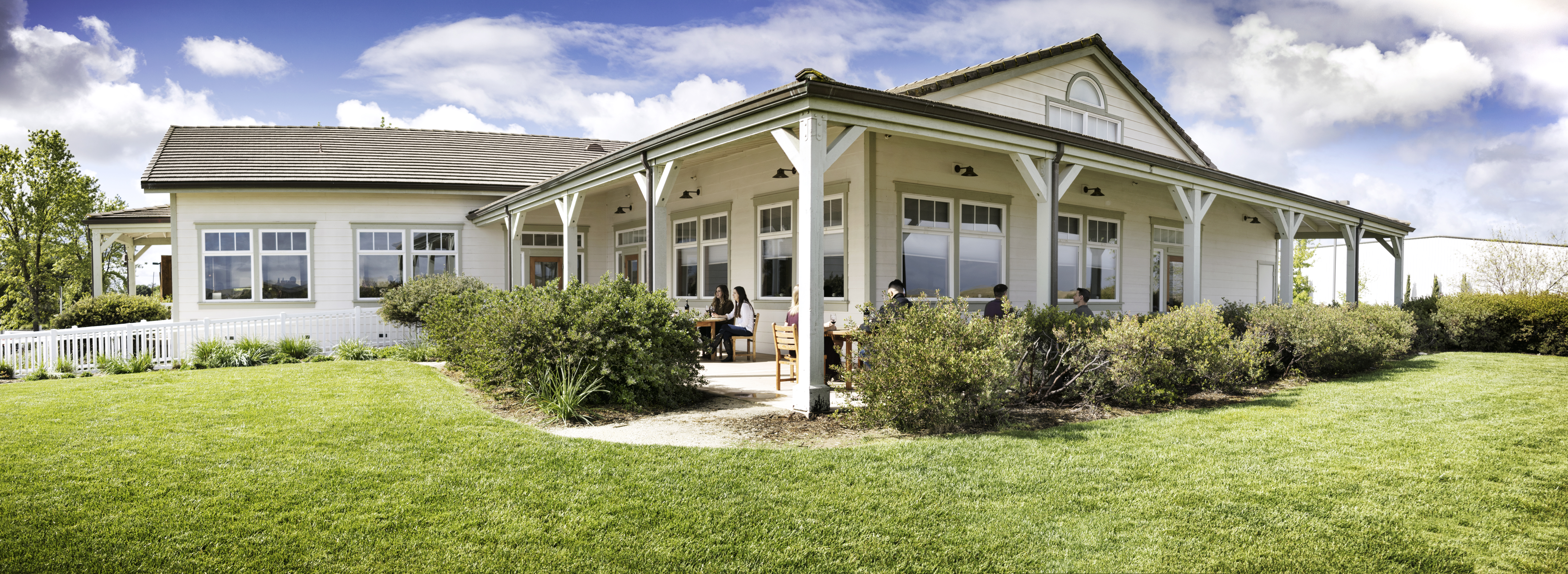
J. Lohr Paso Robles wine center

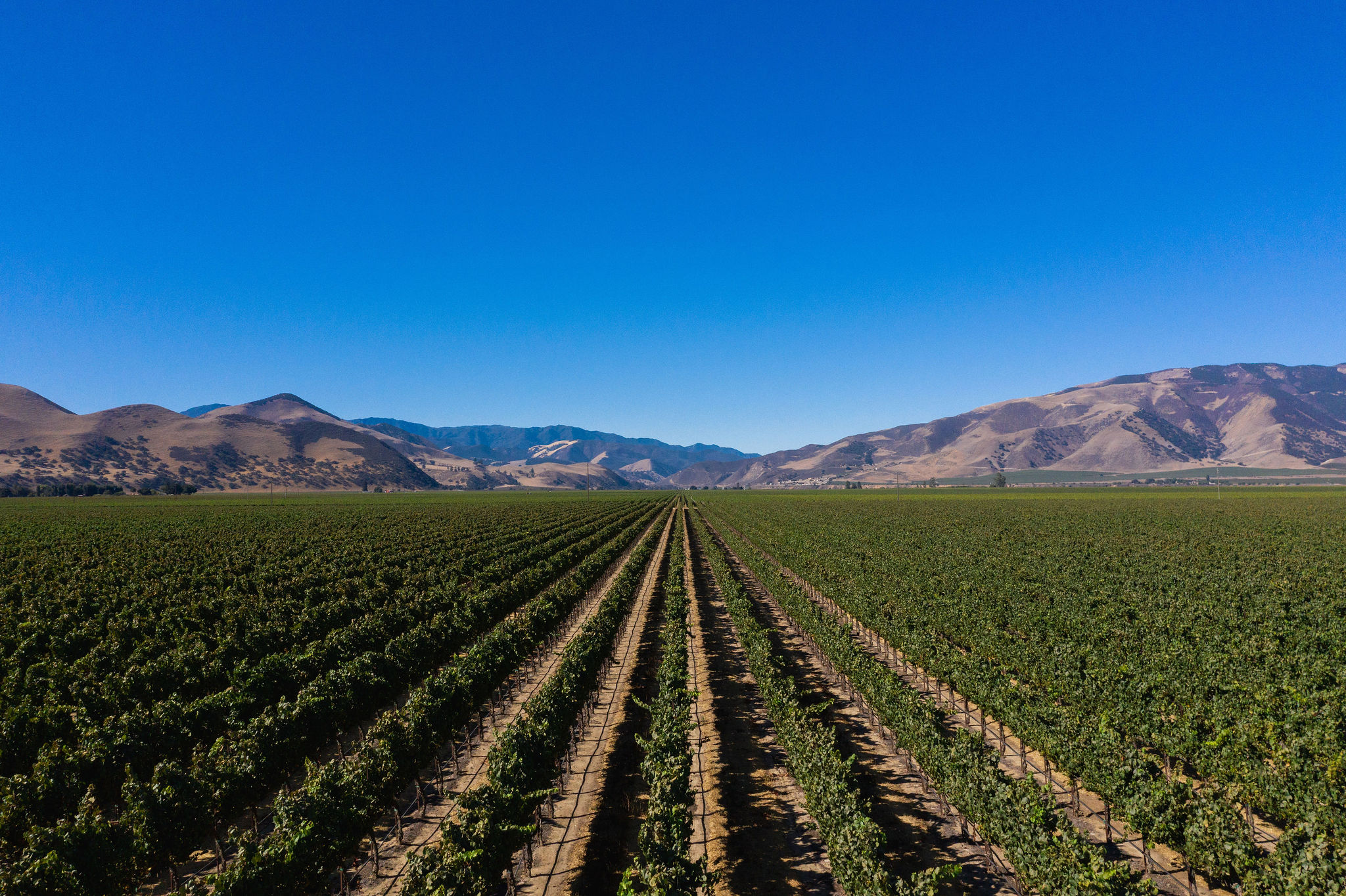
J. Lohr Arroyo Seco vineyard

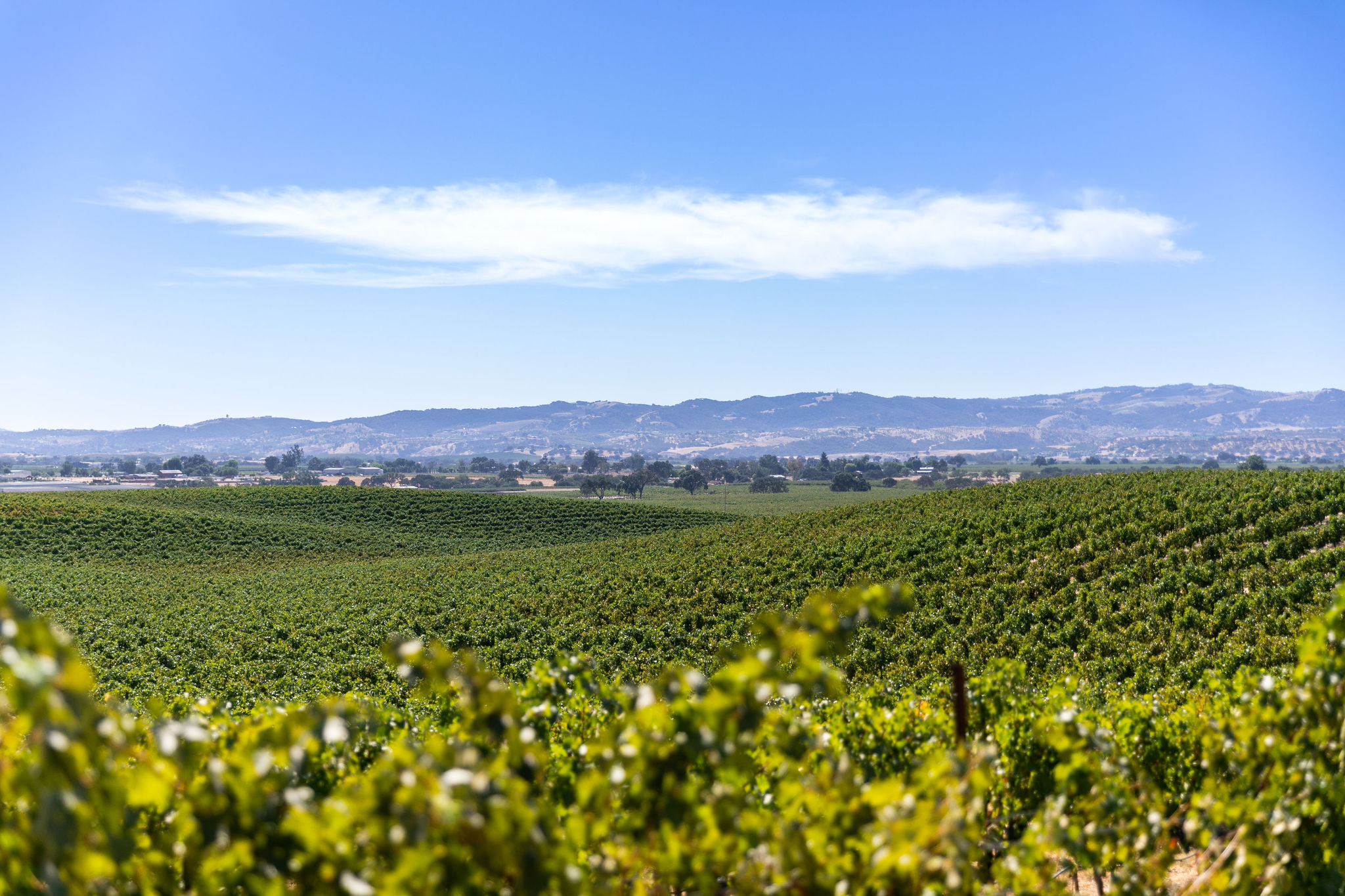
J. Lohr Hilltop vineyard

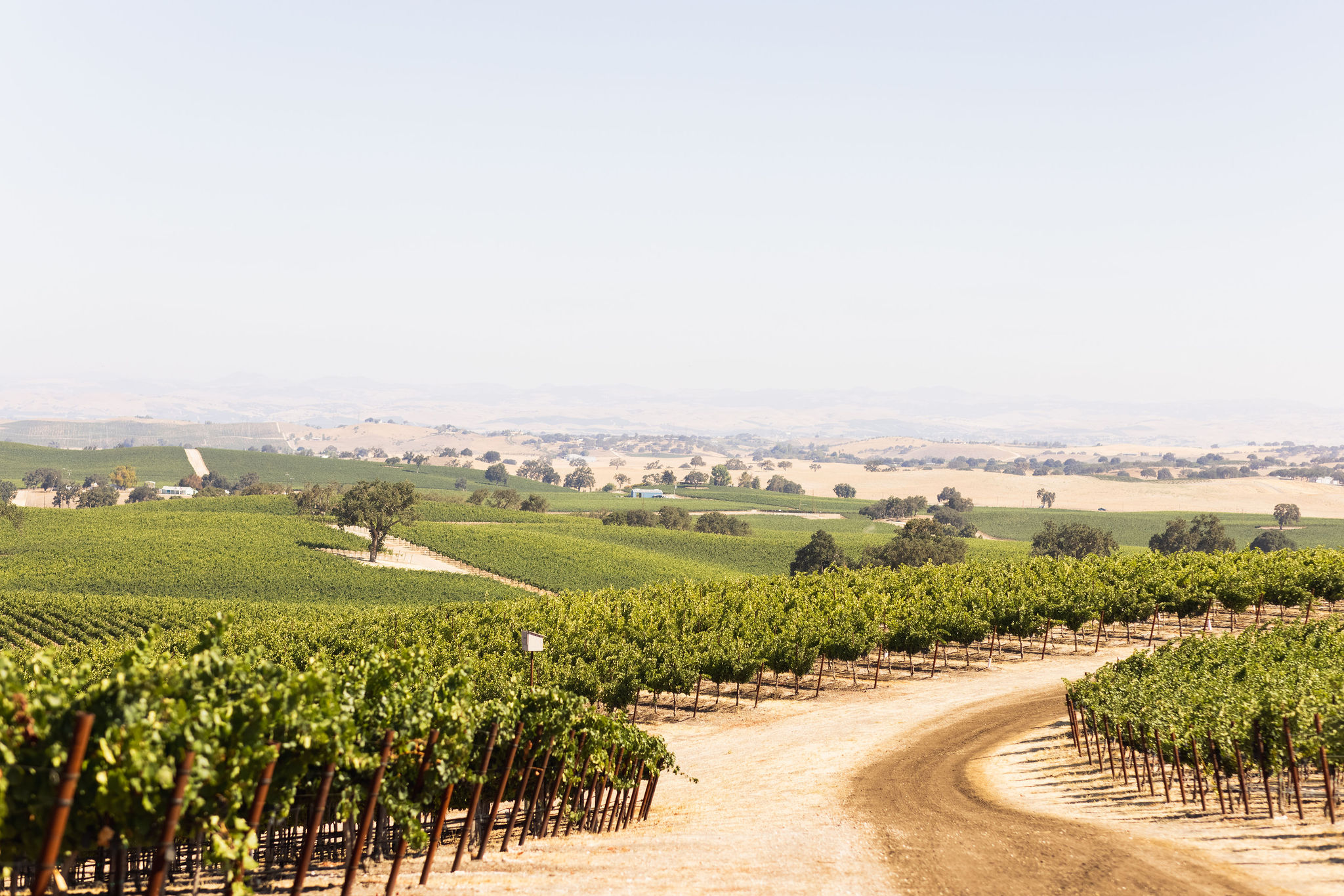
J. Lohr Shotwell vineyard

== Wines ==
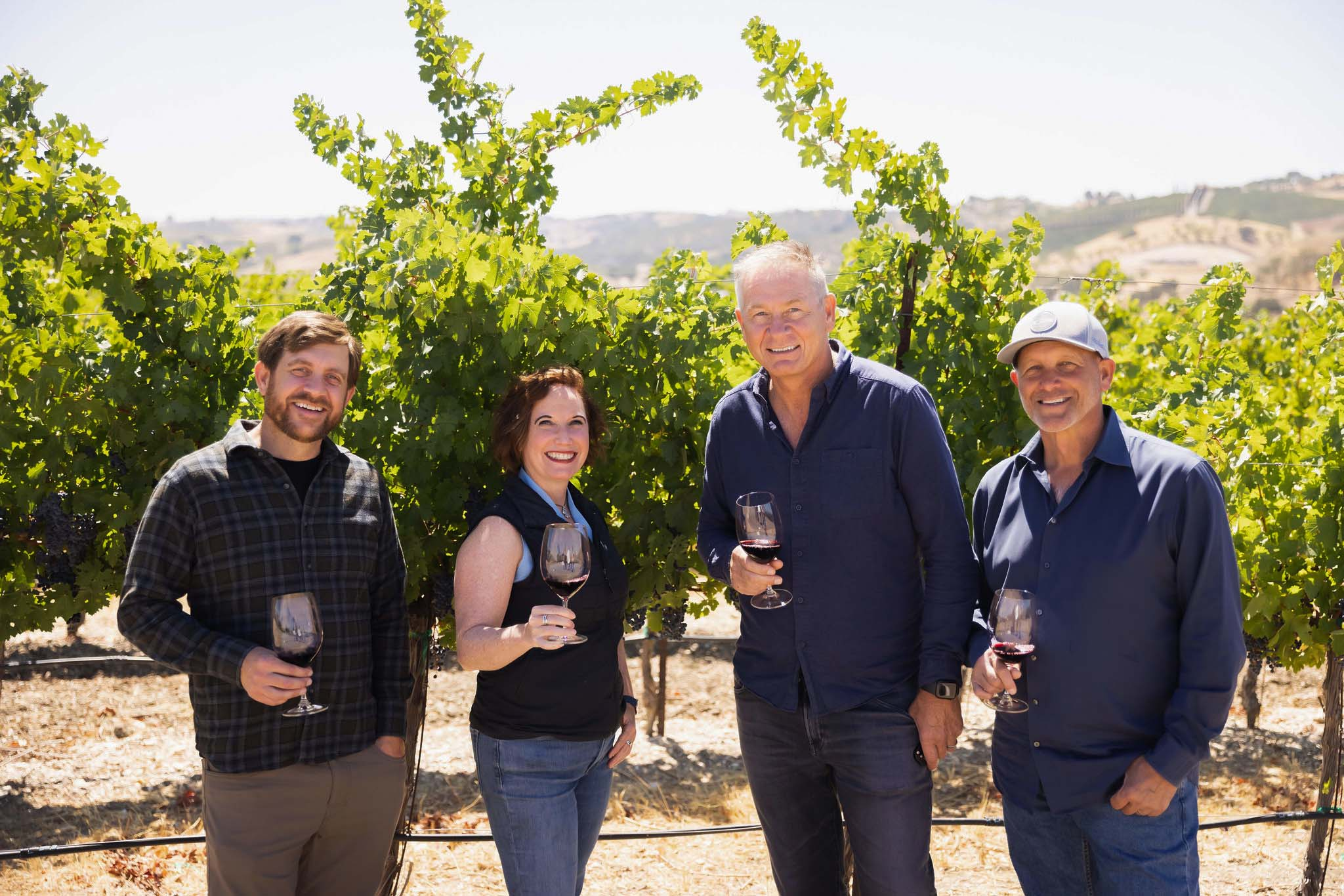
J. Lohr winemaking team

J. Lohr Vineyards & Wines offers eight tiers of wines.

=== J. Lohr Signature Cabernet Sauvignon ===
In 2017, the limited release 2013 J. Lohr Signature Cabernet Sauvignon was introduced to commemorate Founder Jerry Lohr's 80th birthday. The vineyard chosen for this blend is at 1,700 feet in Paso Robles, the Cabernet Sauvignon grapes are hand-harvested, and the wine is aged for 20 months in 100% new French oak barrels.

=== J. Lohr Cuvée Series ===
The J. Lohr Cuvée Series features three blends inspired by three renowned appellations of Bordeaux.

=== J. Lohr Vineyard Series ===
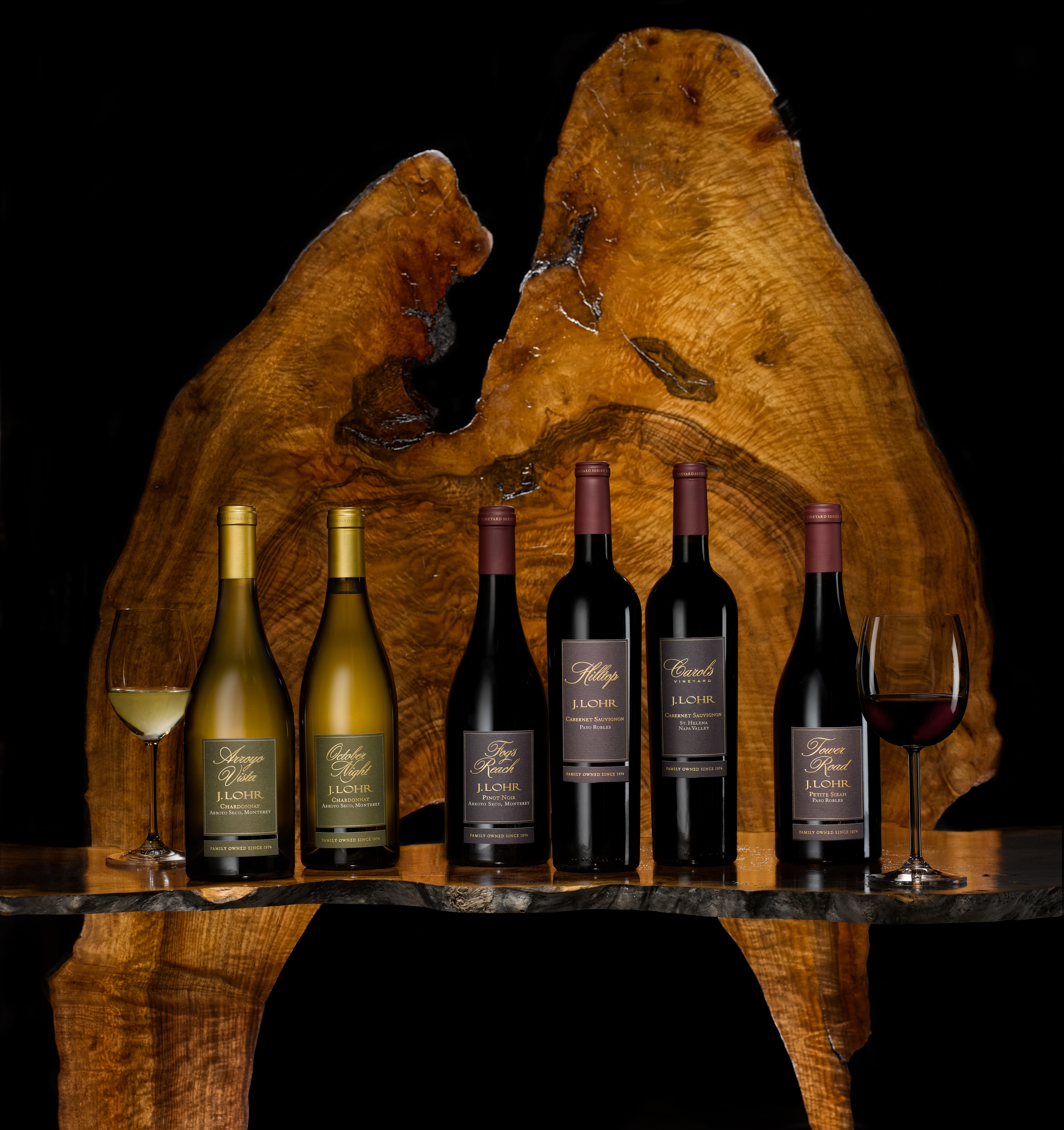
J. Lohr Vineyard Series

The J. Lohr Vineyard Series is a collection of eighteen limited-release, pure and blended varietals from small vineyard blocks.

=== J. Lohr Gesture ===
J. Lohr Gesture is a Rhône-inspired portfolio of member-exclusive wines specially crafted by the Lohr family for its wine club.

=== J. Lohr Pure Paso proprietary red wine ===
In 2019, the company released J. Lohr Pure Paso, a proprietary red wine composed of a blend of the region's signature Cabernet Sauvignon and Petite Sirah wines.

=== J. Lohr Estates ===
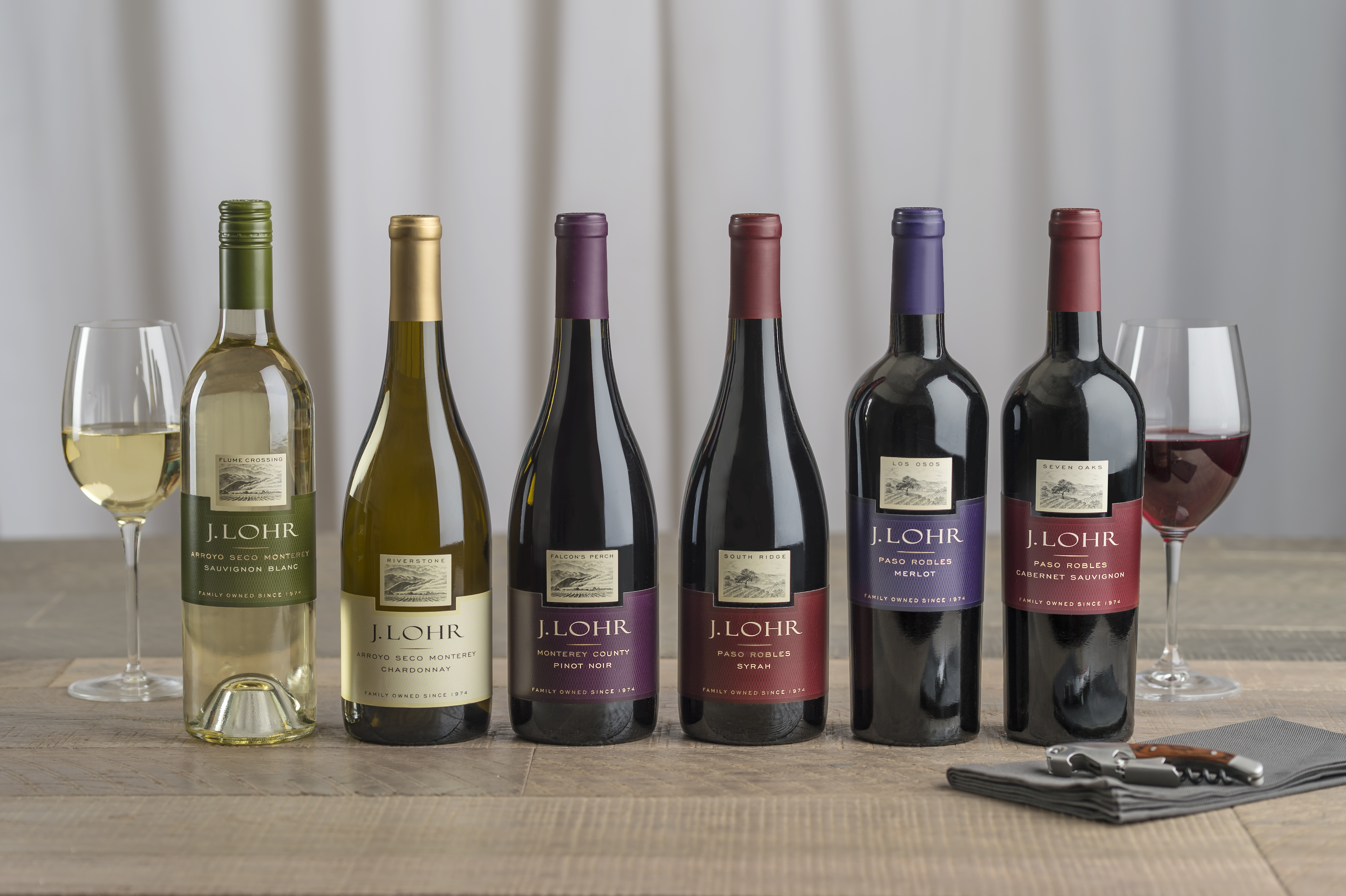
J. Lohr Estates

J. Lohr Estates include Seven Oaks Cabernet Sauvignon, Riverstone Chardonnay, and Los Osos Merlot as well as three other wines.

=== J. Lohr Monterey Roots ===
In 2022, the company released J. Lohr Monterey Roots, a tier of wines including Bay Mist White Riesling and Wildflower Valdiguié.

=== ARIEL Vineyards ===
Named for a character from Shakespeare's “The Tempest,” ARIEL Vineyards uses reverse osmosis and a cold filtration process to extract alcohol from wine. The company held a patent for the double reverse osmosis process allowing it to produce low and non-alcoholic wines.

There are two specialty labels: Painter Bridge and Cypress Vineyards.

== Sustainability ==
In 2010, J. Lohr Vineyards & Wines was named American Winery of the Year by Wine Enthusiast Magazine for its education, industry leadership, sustainability, and corporate social responsibility efforts. The company is Certified California Sustainable in its wineries and vineyards by the California Sustainable Winegrowing Alliance. J. Lohr has a three-acre solar tracking array, the largest in the North American wine industry, at its Paso Robles winery. Between 75% and 85% of the energy needed for the J. Lohr Paso Robles winery and wine center is generated through solar power. Other sustainable practices include biodegradable inks and paper in its packaging, water retention, and soil preservation. Before planting takes place, numerous soil samples are collected from varying depths of seventy-five meter-square grids using satellite technology. Layers of topsoil, subsoil, and substrata are examined, irrigation and canopy management are considered, and temperature variations are recorded. The soil is then left to rest so it can naturally regenerate nutrients before new vines are planted. While four years is the average preparation time before planting, soil prep took 14 years for the company's Arroyo Vista Chardonnay vineyard.

In 2003, J. Lohr Vineyards & Wines began tracking the amount of water it used in the winery to make wine. At the time, the industry standard was to use six to seven gallons of water to make one gallon of wine, whereas J. Lohr only used 3.5 gallons of water to make a gallon of wine. Within a few years, J. Lohr was able to drop its ratio to 1.6 gallons of water used in the winery to produce one gallon of wine. Once the harvest and pressing have taken place, the grape seeds, leaves, stems, skin, and other organic materials that remain are composted, then once again returned to the soil to preserve nutrients and moisture. The decomposition helps recycle the nutrients, and the compost from previous harvests creates a barrier that conserves moisture.

== Philanthropy ==
J. Lohr Vineyards & Wines contributes to hundreds of organizations each year. Since 2009, it has partnered with National Breast Cancer Foundation (NBCF), providing mammograms to women in need through the company's Touching Lives program. Three dollars from every bottle sold of J. Lohr Carol's Vineyard Cabernet Sauvignon are donated to NBCF programs, which has led to the funding of more than 8,000 mammograms. Carol's Vineyard is named after Jerry Lohr's late wife, Carol Waldorf Lohr, who died of breast cancer in 2008. The initiative also contributes to Patient Navigation programs delivering various women's health services and HOPE Kits for women undergoing breast cancer treatment.
