= Jerry Lohr =

American winegrower (born 1937)

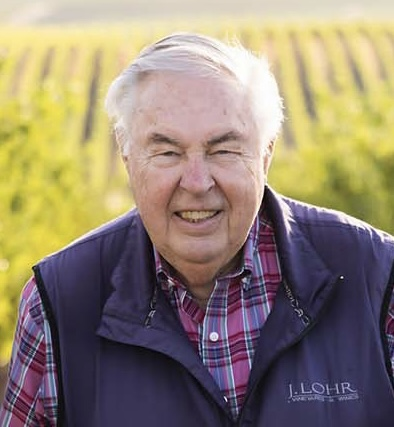
- Founder Jerry Lohr, J. Lohr Vineyards & Wines
- Born: January 1, 1937 (age 89); Clark, South Dakota
- Occupations: Builder, Agriculturist, Winegrower
- Years active: 64
- Known for: Founder of J. Lohr Vineyards & Wines
- Notable work: Variable stiffness polymeric damper (for solar panels that powered satellites)

Jerome Julian Lohr (born January 1, 1937) is an American real estate developer, agriculturist, and winegrower. Lohr is the founder of J. Lohr Vineyards & Wines, a winegrowing, and winemaking company based in San Jose, California. J. Lohr Vineyards & Wines operates vineyards in the Paso Robles AVA in San Luis Obispo County, Arroyo Seco AVA in Monterey County, and the St. Helena AVA in Napa Valley, California. Lohr has earned a reputation as a pioneer of winegrowing on the Central Coast of California. The Jerome J. Lohr College of Engineering opened at South Dakota State University (SDSU) in June 2013 in his honor.

== Early life and education ==
Lohr was born to Walter and Frances Lohr in Clark, South Dakota. He grew up on their family farm in Raymond, South Dakota, with his four siblings Alan, Sharon, James, and Lynn. During his senior year of high school, Lohr attended an event at SDSU and won the Edgar M. Soreng full-tuition scholarship for his first year of college.

During his freshman year, he joined the Air Force ROTC program at SDSU, a requirement for males in the 1950s. Lohr was named Distinguished Air Force Cadet in the ROTC program. U.S. Senator Karl Mundt nominated Lohr for admission to West Point. South Dakota Rep. Harold Lovre nominated Lohr for admission to the Naval Academy. Lohr declined the invitations and continued his studies at SDSU.

Lohr worked part-time as a surveyor during college for J.T. Banner and Associates, an engineering and consulting firm.In 1958, Lohr earned a degree in civil engineering from South Dakota State College, now South Dakota State University (SDSU). He then earned a Master of Science in Civil Engineering from Stanford University in 1959.

== Engineering career ==
After pursuing a Ph.D. in civil engineering at Stanford University until 1961, Lohr began active-duty service for the U.S. Air Force and served as a research scientist at the NASA Ames Research Center in Mountain View, California.

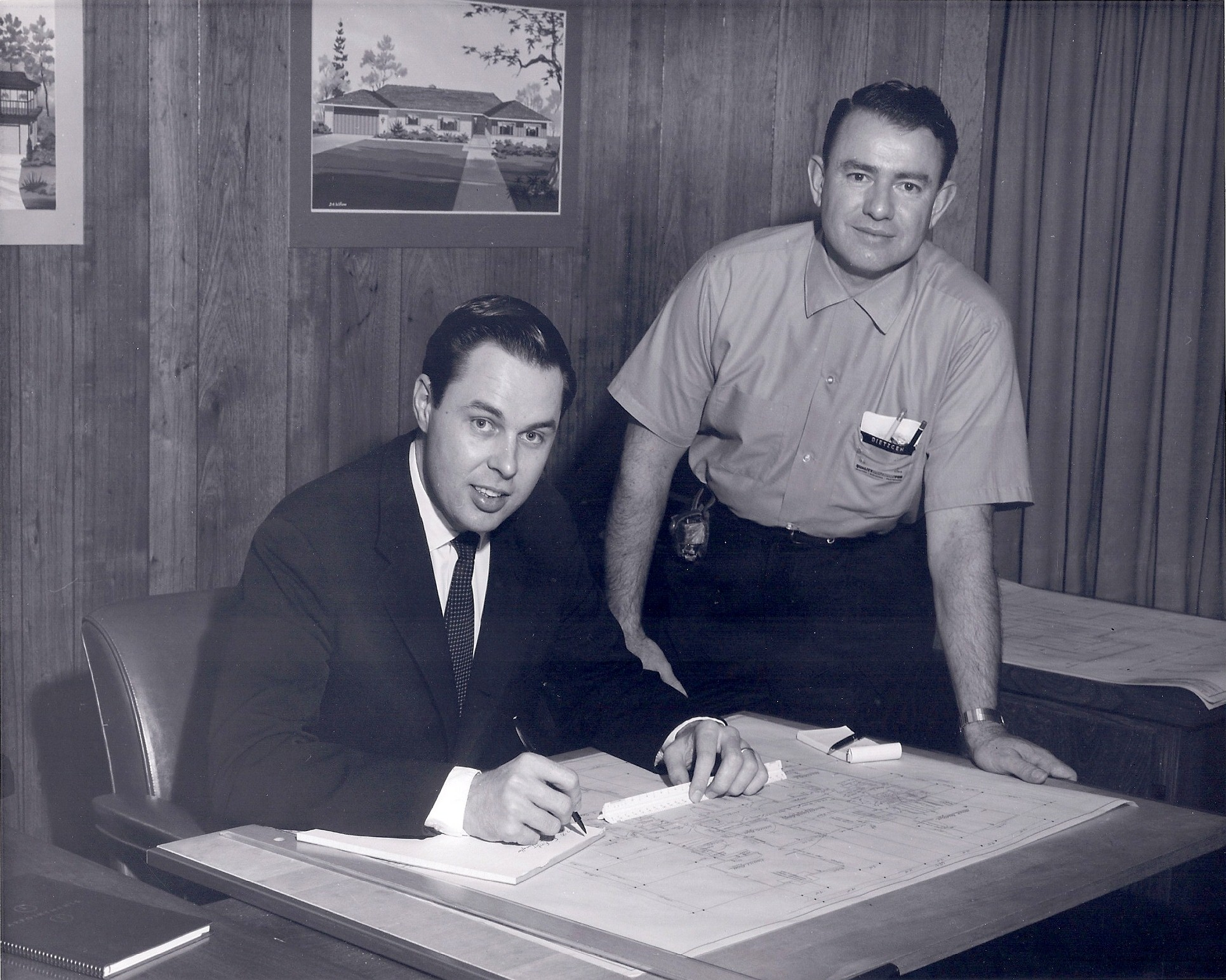
Early Jerry Lohr and Bernie Turgeon

Lohr was honorably discharged, with the rank of captain, from the U.S. Air Force in 1964. He continued as a civilian research scientist at NASA Ames until 1967, focusing on "heat shield technology" for crewed U.S. spacecraft, including the Apollo 11 mission in which man landed on the moon in 1969. Lohr also focused on improving the efficiency of solar panels that powered satellites. Lohr earned a U.S. patent in his name for his "energy damper system" to reduce that oscillation.

Before leaving Ames, Lohr realized that the population of what is known today as Silicon Valley was expanding and that people would need more homes. He partnered with Bernie Turgeon to create Saratoga Foothills Development Corp., a custom home building business, in 1965. From 1963 to 2003, Lohr's homebuilding business built over 900 custom homes and 15 apartment and condominium projects in Santa Clara, Alameda, and Monterey counties.

== Winegrowing career ==
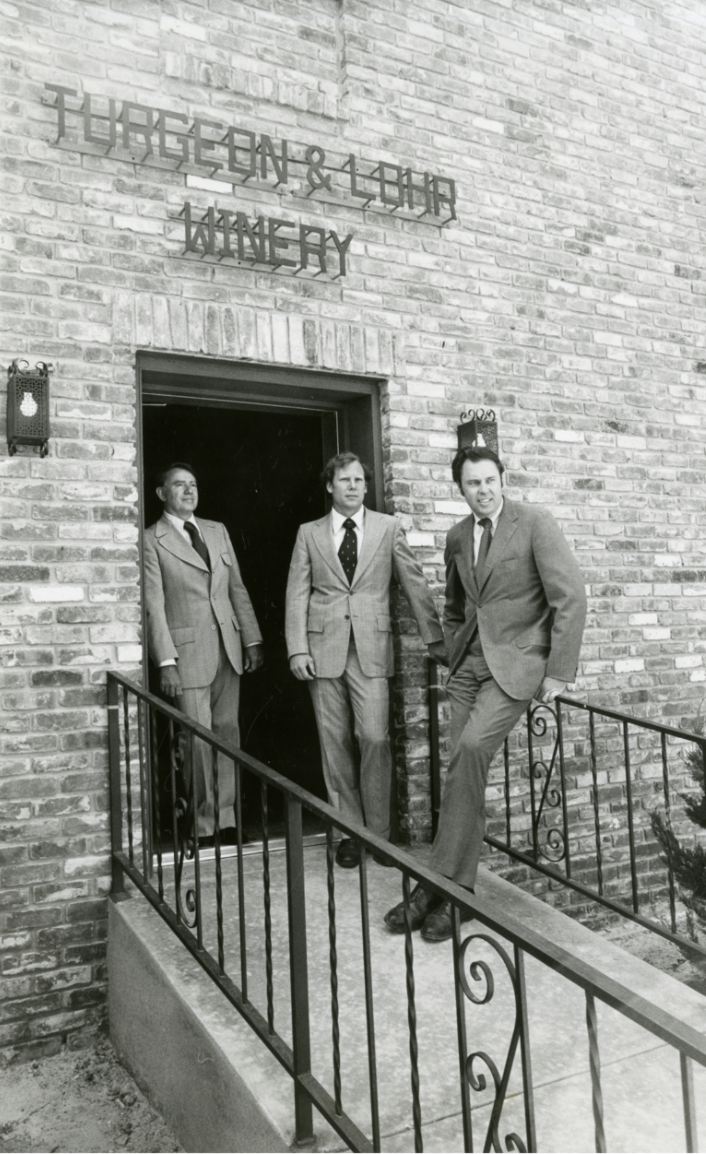
Turgeon & Lohr Winery

During the late 1960s, Lohr began a decades-long investigation into the winegrowing regions of California. Lohr developed his first 280-acre vineyard in the Arroyo Seco region of Monterey County in 1972. He is credited as being among the first to realize the potential of Monterey County's soil and climate for growing white wine grapes. In 1986, Lohr expanded operations to the Paso Robles AVA of California by planting Cabernet Sauvignon, Merlot, and other red varieties.

"What Robert Mondavi was to Napa Valley, Jerry Lohr is to the Central Coast, leading and elevating an entire viticultural region from Monterey County to Paso Robles with perseverance, dedication and a passion for quality," said Adam Strum, the chairman of Wine Enthusiast Companies.

In 1975, Lohr co-founded and was later chairman of Monterey County Winegrowers, which eventually became Monterey County Vintners and Growers Association. Lohr is a former director and chairman of Wine Institute and was a founding member of Wine Vision, which promoted making wine more a part of American culture. Lohr also was founding chairman and former director of the National Grape and Wine Initiative, now NGRA, or National Grape Research Alliance.

J. Lohr Vineyards & Wines owns and cultivates over 4,000 acres of vineyards across the Paso Robles AVA in San Luis Obispo County, Arroyo Seco and Santa Lucia Highlands AVAs in Monterey County, and the St. Helena AVA in Napa Valley, California.

In 2013, Lohr's son, Steve Lohr, succeeded his father as CEO of J. Lohr Vineyards & Wines. Jerry Lohr continues his work as an advocate, philanthropist, and educator in the wine industry and at his alma mater, SDSU.

== Philanthropy and university leadership ==
In 1976, Lohr was among the original donors for the new Alumni Center at SDSU. Lohr joined the SDSU Foundation in 1987 and served as its chairman from 1992 to 1994. He funded the Jerome J. Lohr Award for Volunteer Leadership.

Lohr is former chairman of the UC Davis Executive Leadership Board, and former member of the UC Davis Chancellor's Advisory Committee.

Donations to National Breast Cancer Foundation in honor of his late wife, Carol, are one of several philanthropic efforts. Lohr has focused much of his philanthropy on his alma mater, SDSU. He contributed to building projects on campus, including $4 million in 2003 to rebuild Solberg Hall, home of the College of Engineering, where Lohr did most of his studying. In 2004, Lohr's $2.3 million donation built the Jerome J. Lohr Building at the SDSU Foundation. Lohr raised $254 million for other building projects on campus in 2013. In the same year, SDSU named the engineering building the Jerome J. Lohr College of Engineering. Lohr was a donor to the UC Davis LEED Platinum Research and Teaching Winery at the Robert Mondavi Institute for Wine and Food Science. In 2021, Lohr donated $5 million to the Jerome J. Lohr College of Engineering's endowment. In 2021, Lohr donated $2.5 million to fund the Justin and J. Lohr Center for Wine and Viticulture at Cal Poly San Luis Obispo.

== Personal life ==
Lohr lives in Saratoga, California, where he lived with his first wife, Carol Waldorf Lohr. They met when they both attended Stanford University and married in 1959. Lohr had three children with Carol; Steve, Cynthia, and Lawrence, all of whom share ownership of and manage J. Lohr Vineyards & Wines. Carol Waldorf Lohr died in 2008 from breast cancer. Jerry and the Lohr family have released two wine brands highlighting "Carol's Vineyard", the vineyard named after her in the St. Helena appellation of Napa Valley.

In 2009, Lohr married Jolene Johnson Barber, whom he dated while attending South Dakota State University. They were married at Jolene's church in Garretson, South Dakota.

== Awards ==
- 1998 Distinguished Engineer, South Dakota State University
- 2007 Award of Distinction, University of California, Davis
- 2007 Lifetime Achievement Award, California State Fair
- 2010 Professional Excellence in Oenology award, New York Institute of Technology (NYIT)
- 2011 ASEV Merit Award, American Society for Enology and Viticulture (ASEV)
- 2011 Lifetime Achievement Award, California Association of Winegrape Growers
- 2016 American Wine Legend, Wine Enthusiast Magazine
- 2019 Agriculturist of the Year, California Mid-State Fair
