= John Dawson Watson =

English painter (1832–1892)

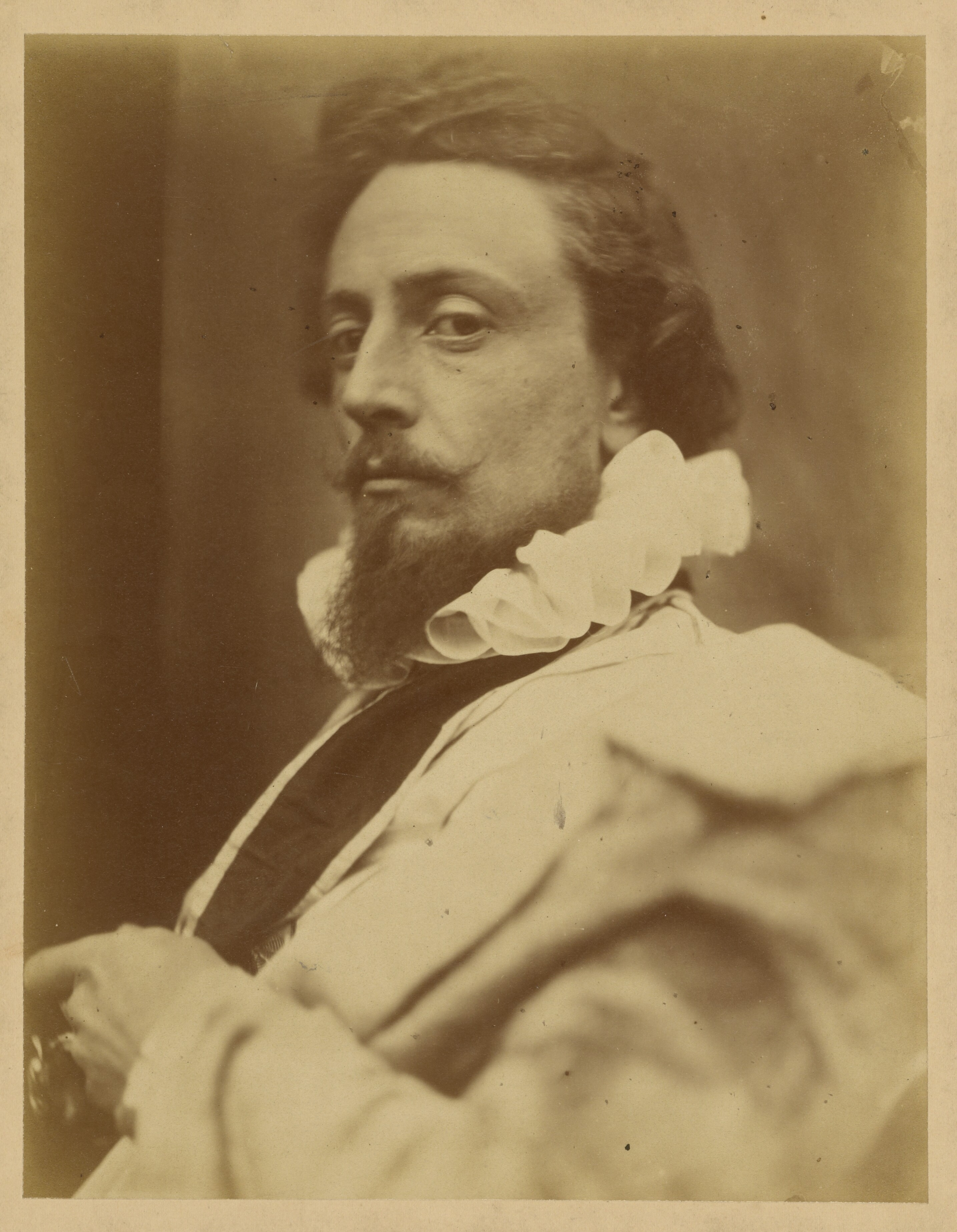
John Dawson Watson in fancy dress, c. 1863

John Dawson Watson RWS (20 May 1832 – 3 January 1892) was a British painter, mainly in watercolour, and illustrator. Apart from his illustrations for books and magazines, he was best known for small figure subjects in watercolour, typically of couples of lovers, small children or single females. He lived in London, but spent much time in North Wales.

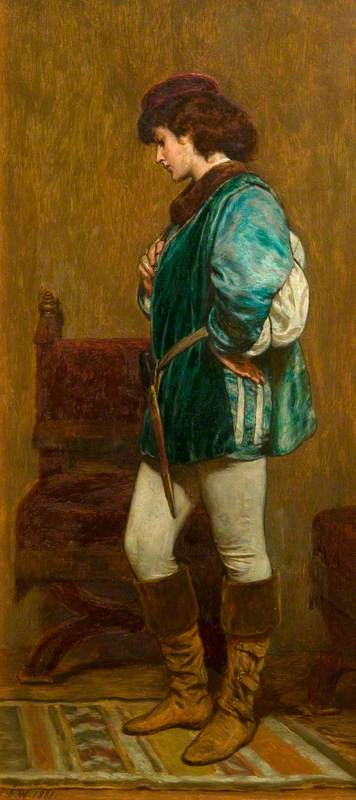
Rosalind Preparing to Leave Duke Frederick's Palace (As You Like It by Shakespeare), oils, Victoria and Albert Museum

He was educated at King Edward VI Grammar School, Sedbergh School and Manchester School of Design. His son was the Impressionist painter Dawson Dawson-Watson. His sister, Frances, married Myles Birkett Foster in 1864.

== Work ==
Watson exhibited at the Royal Academy from 1853 to 1890, the British Institution, the Society of British Artists Suffolk Street, Royal Watercolour Society, and the Grosvenor Gallery. In the 1860s and 1870s he became nationally recognised for his genre scenes, often of historical themes and children. His pictures were usually small, painted on panel or board, and showed a Pre-Raphaelite feeling for colour and detail. He was also a prolific and notable illustrator, producing many designs for books and periodicals. His work appeared in: Once a Week, Good Words, London Society and others; amongst the many books he illustrated were Pilgrim's Progress, Arabian Nights and Isaac Watts' Divine and Moral Songs. Works by him are in the Victoria and Albert Museum, Norwich Castle and Walker Art Gallery in Liverpool.

Watson died of a respiratory infection on 3 January 1892, aged 59 in Conwy, Wales.
