= Loehr =

Loehr is a surname of German origin. Notable people with the surname include:

- Al Loehr (1927–2013), American politician
- Arnold William Loehr (1886–1963), American-born Canadian farmer and politician
- Dolores Loehr (a.k.a. Diana Lynn; 1926–1971), American actor and pianist
- Gustave Loehr (1864–1918), American civic leader, co-founder of Rotary International
- Max Loehr (1903–1988), American art historian, author, and professor of Chinese art
- Pearl Grace Loehr (1882–1944), American photographer and arts educator
- Peter Loehr (born 1967), China-based American film producer, writer, and actor
- Peter Loehr (politician) (1831–1899), Prussian German-born American politician
- Rodney Loehr (1907–2005), American historian, university professor, book reviewer, television host, and soldier
- Stephen Yale-Loehr (born 1954), American law professor and immigration law attorney

== See also ==
- Löhr (surname)
- Lohr (surname)
