= Muhlenberg legend =

Urban legend in the United States and Germany

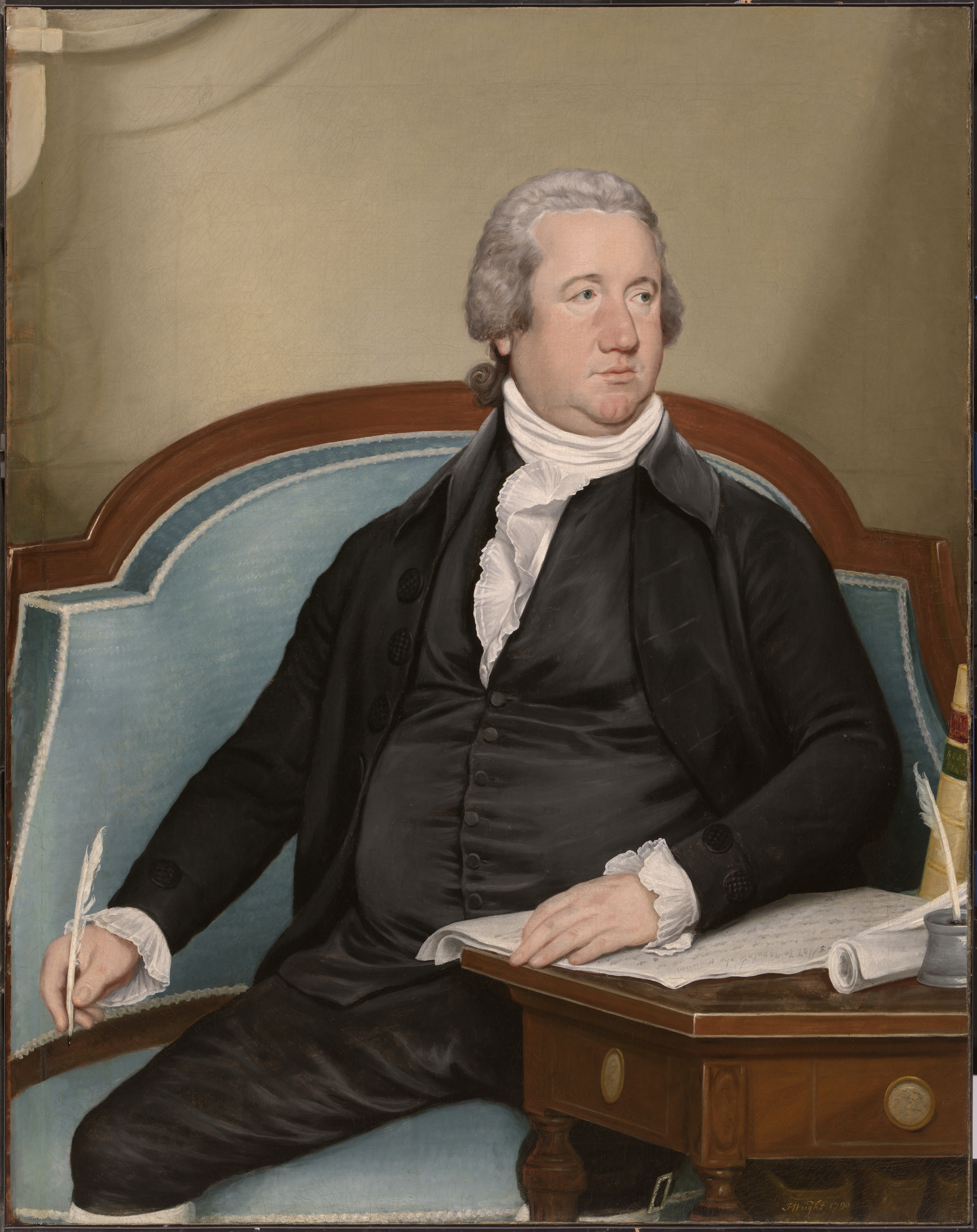
Frederick Muhlenberg, first Speaker of the US House of Representatives, who did not cast a deciding vote in 1794, 1776, or any other year, to prevent German from becoming the official language of the United States

The Muhlenberg legend is an urban legend in the United States and Germany. According to the legend, the single vote of Frederick Muhlenberg, the first-ever Speaker of the US House of Representatives, prevented German from becoming an official language of the United States. The story has a long history and has been told in several variations, which may be based in part on actual events.

The United States, however, has no statutory official language; English has been used on a de facto basis because of its status as the country's predominant language, and has also been designated as the official language of the executive branch of the federal government by an executive order issued on March 1, 2025. Several US states have passed official language laws.

== History ==
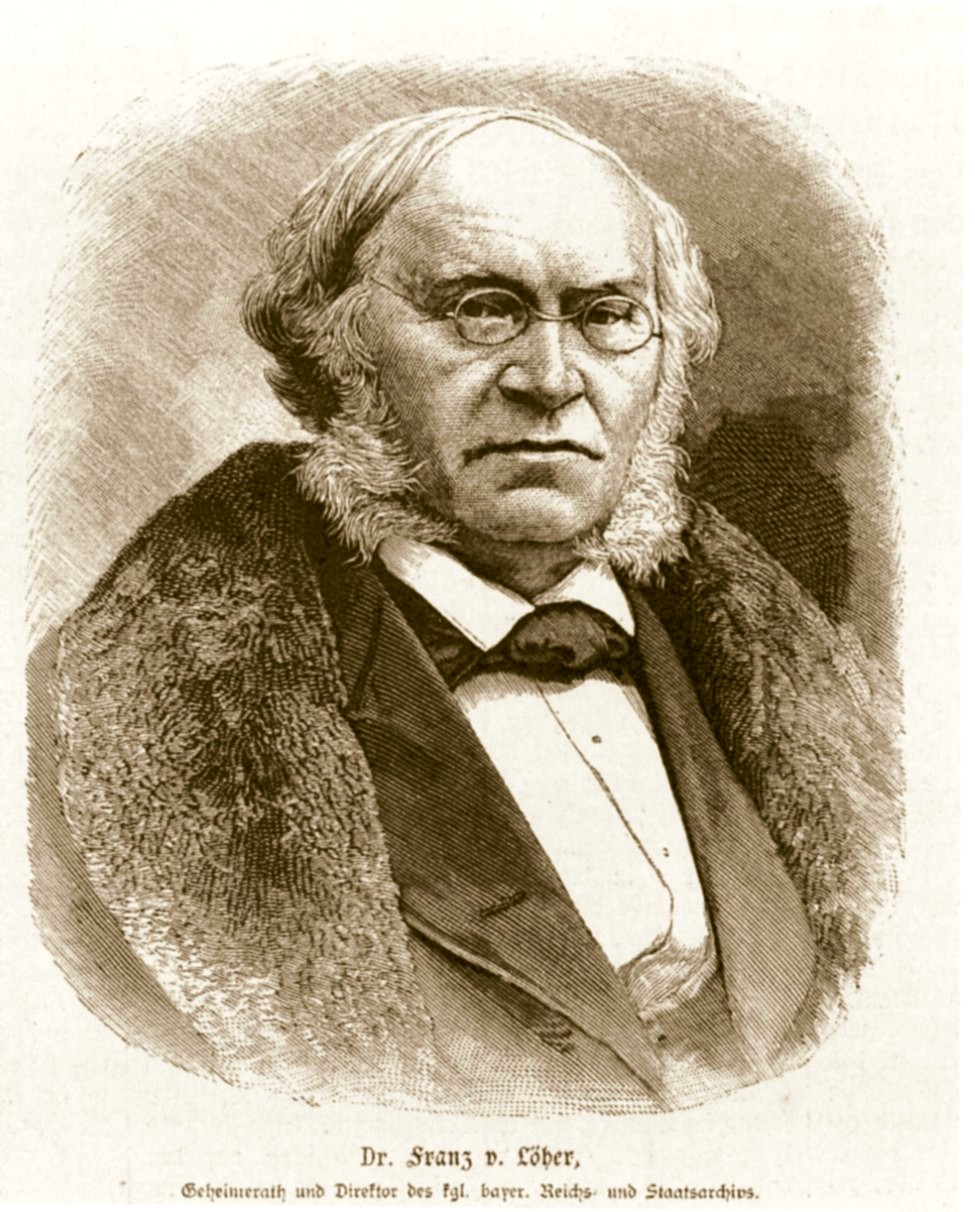
Franz Löher, whose 1847 German book included an early version of the story

There are several versions of the story. One source of the legend may be a vote in the US House of Representatives in 1794 after a group of German immigrants had asked for the translation of some laws into German. The petition was debated by the House of Representatives but was not acted upon. A vote to adjourn and to reconsider it later was defeated 42 to 41. Muhlenberg, who was of German descent himself and had not voted in the roll call, was later quoted as having said that "the faster the Germans become Americans, the better it will be."

Other accounts credit Franz von Löher as the source of the legend. Löher was a German visitor to the United States who published the book Geschichte und Zustände der Deutschen in Amerika (History and Conditions of the Germans in America) in 1847. Löher seemingly placed the crucial vote only in Pennsylvania to make German the official language of that state, not the United States as a whole. (Philadelphia was the city in which the US Congress then sat, but it was also the capital of Pennsylvania. To confuse matters further, Muhlenburg had served as Speaker of the Pennsylvania House before he served in that title in the US Congress.) According to Löher, the vote was a tie, which Muhlenberg broke for English.

Another version of the myth, which puts the vote in 1774 by the Continental Congress, appeared in Ripley's Believe It or Not! as early as 1930. Ripley's included the myth in a 1982 book as well. Ripley's version credits the story to an alleged letter by Heinrich Melchior Muhlenberg published in Halle in 1887.

The legend has a long history and led to a number of analyses and articles published from the late 1920s to the early 1950s explaining that the story was false. The story was dubbed the "Muhlenberg Legend" by the late 1940s. Nevertheless, the legend persists.

For example, in 1987, a letter from a former Missouri election official emphasized the importance of voting in an Ann Landers column. He included a list of events allegedly decided by one vote from his local election manual, one of which was a claim that "in 1776, one vote gave America the English language instead of German" (in fact, versions of the error-filled list long had predated the 1987 Ann Landers mention). That led to another round of news stories again pointing out that it was a myth. Oblivious to corrections of that sort, Ann Landers ran the same list again in November 1996. A chorus of dismayed responses caused Landers to clear up the matter in a subsequent column.

== See also ==
- German language in the United States
- Languages of the United States
- List of the United States communities where English is not the majority language spoken at home
