= Myles Birket Foster =

English illustrator, watercolour artist and engraver (1825–1899)

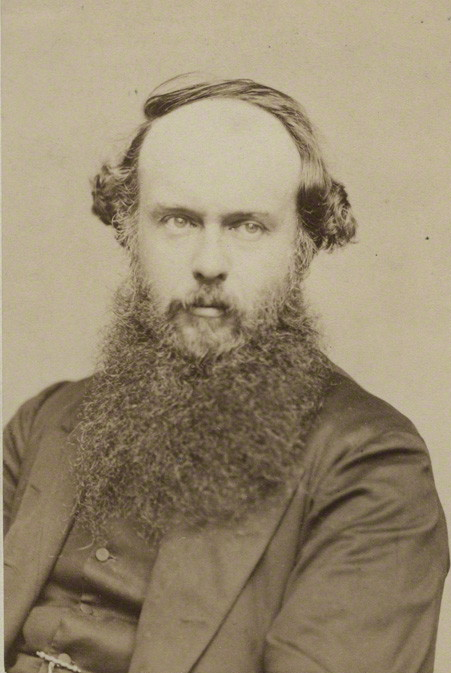
Myles Birket Foster by Elliott & Fry, 1860s

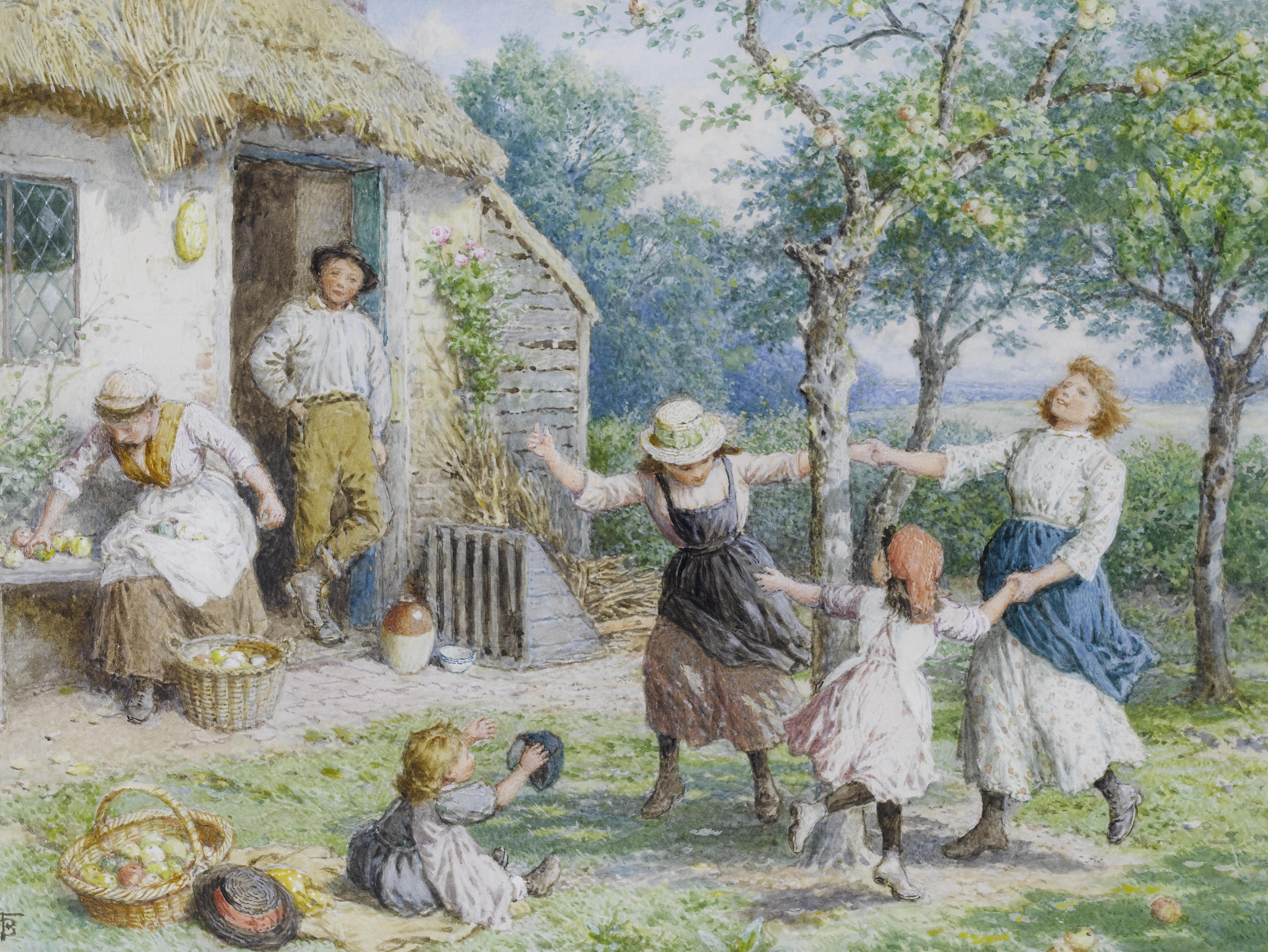
Ring a Ring a Roses, a typical watercolour

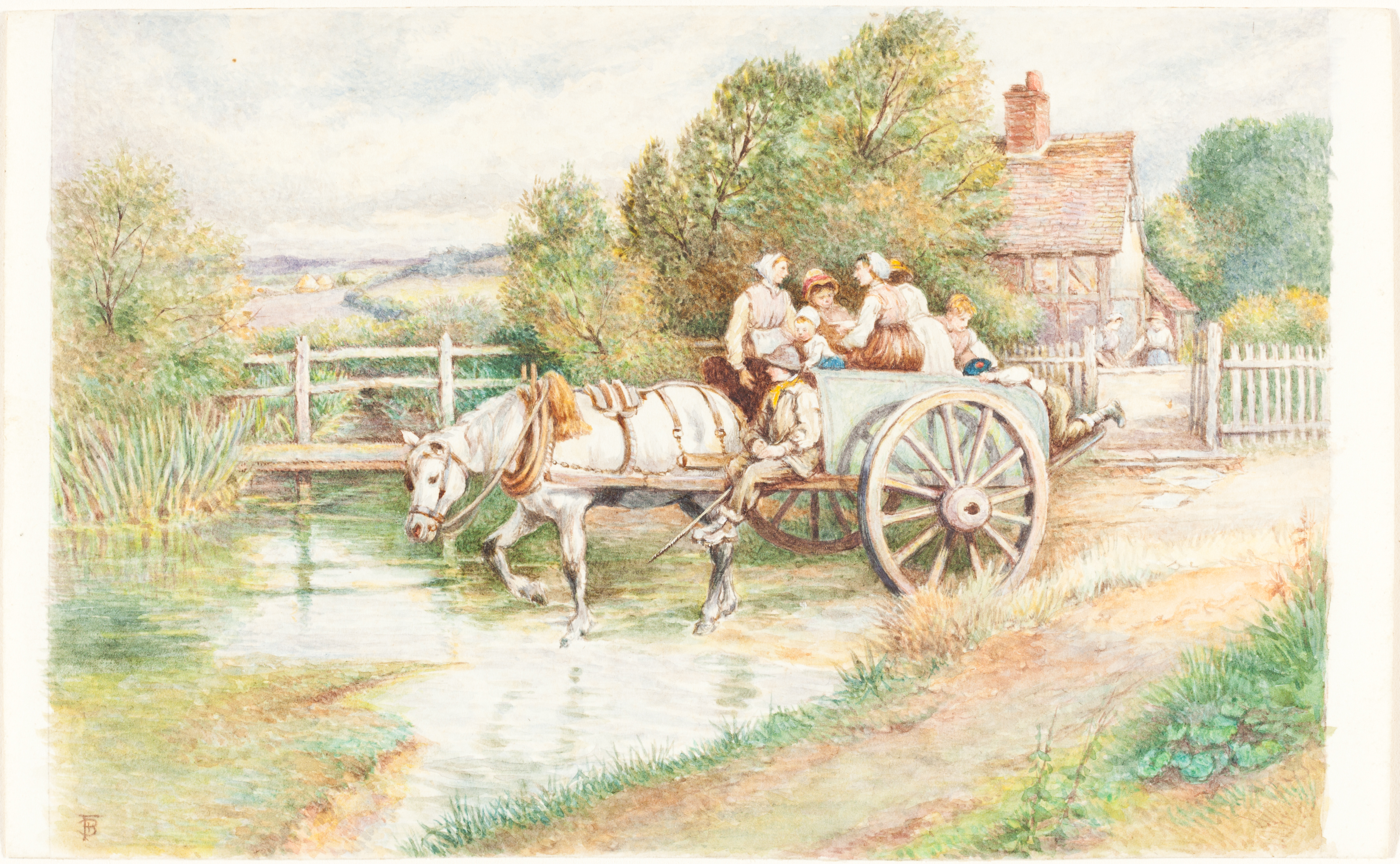
Children in a Cart, watercolour, National Gallery of Art

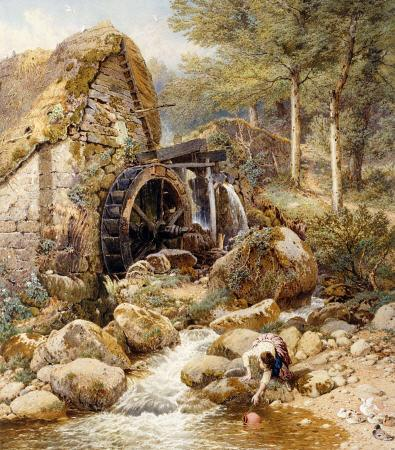
The Old Watermill

Myles Birket Foster RWS (4 February 1825 – 27 March 1899) was a British illustrator, watercolourist and engraver in the Victorian period. His name is also to be found as Myles Birkett Foster.

He became famous, and rich, from his watercolours of sentimental scenes of country people, especially children, presenting an idealized view of the rural life of southern England. His obituary in The Times referred to him as "certainly the most popular water-colour artist of our time". Especially in his earlier career he painted many fine landscapes, often including buildings. By the end of his career, he was often copied and faked; he usually signed with a simple monogram that was all too easy for others to use.

His eldest son, with the same name, (29 November 1851–18 December 1922), was an organist, composer and writer on music.

== Life and work ==
Foster was born in North Shields, England of a primarily Quaker family, but his family moved south to London in 1830, where his father founded M. B. Foster & sons — a successful beer-bottling company. He was schooled at Hitchin, Hertfordshire and on leaving initially went into his father's business. However, noticing his talent for art, his father secured an apprenticeship with the wood-engraver, Ebenezer Landells, where he worked on illustrations for Punch magazine and the Illustrated London News. Foster's boss was one of the founders of Punch, and for him was tasked to make and draw woodcuts, which were crafted with great finesse. Rural scenes taken from travels with his brother and friend Edmund Evans, could be supplemented by popular sporting events such as the early Oxford and Cambridge boat races. Landells was working from Fleet Street when in July 1846 a famous image of Tynemouth Priory appeared with Birket Foster's own name; his apprenticeship had come to a conclusion.

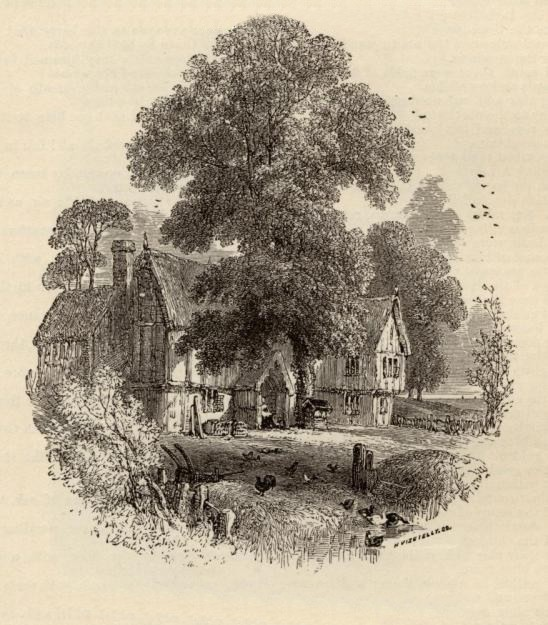
A Birket Foster illustration from "The Complete Poetical Works of Henry Wadsworth Longfellow"

On leaving Landells' employ, he continued to produce work for the Illustrated London News and the Illustrated London Almanack, landing his first exhibition at the Suffolk Street Art Gallery, Westminster during the year 1843. His famous image of "A Christmas Holly Cart" was used by the new traders of seasonal cards, and included in the Illustrated London News by the end of 1848. He also found work as a book illustrator and, during the 1850s, trained himself to paint in watercolours. His illustrations of Longfellow's Evangeline and books of poetry by other contemporaries were a great success, and he quickly became a successful artist in watercolours. He married for the first time on 13 August 1850, a young Geordie woman, and a cousin. Anne, the daughter of Robert Spence of North Shields, was descended from Robert Foster of Hebblethwaite Hall. They hailed from the hilltop gentry farming stock. Bringing a dowry and money to London, the newly-wed couple moved into a salubrious address on the edge of London at Marsden Villa, Clifton Road, on Clifton Hill in the fashionable district of St Johns Wood. Foster's parents were residing nearby transforming the northern family into thoroughgoing Londoners.

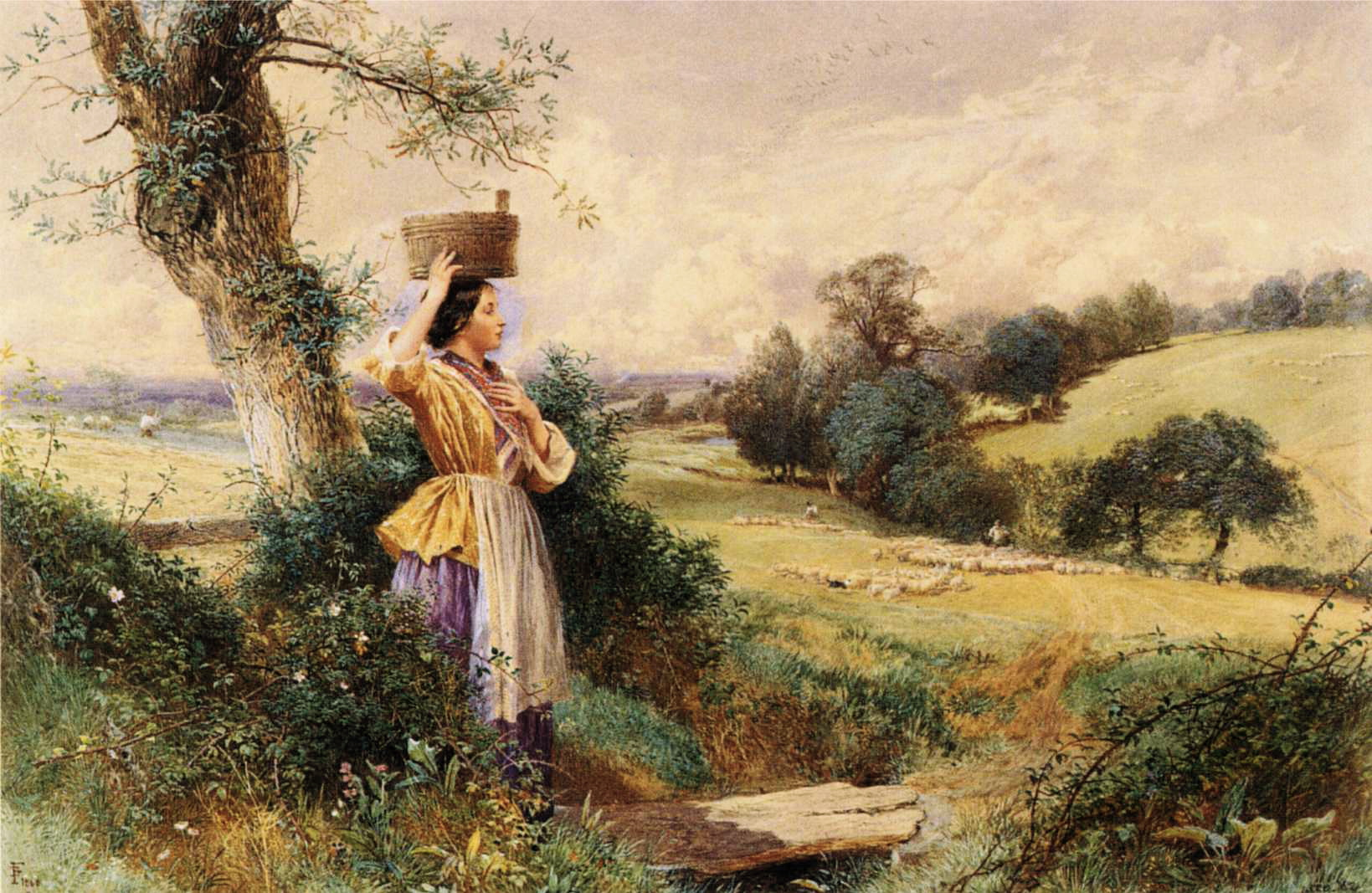
The Milkmaid, 1860, watercolour, V&A Museum

Birket Foster became an Associate of the "Old" Watercolour Society (later the Royal Watercolour Society) in 1860 and exhibited some 400 of his paintings at the Royal Academy over more than 2 decades. Birket Foster travelled widely, painting the countryside around Scotland, the Rhine Valley, the Swiss lakes and in Italy, especially Venice. In 1863 he moved to Witley, near Godalming in Surrey where he had an elaborate Tudor-style house ("The Hill") built. Being friendly with Edward Burne-Jones and William Morris, he had the house decorated and furnished in contemporary style, with tiles and paintings by Burne-Jones and Morris' firm, Morris and Company. The same year he published a volume of "English Landscapes," with text by Tom Taylor.

Although he had painted great numbers of landscape scenes from Scotland to the Mediterranean, it was after moving to Witley that Birket Foster produced the works for which he is best known—a sentimentalised view of the contemporary English countryside, particularly in the west Surrey area. Although criticised for their idealised view of rural life, they were recognised for their detail and execution. Birket Foster's work (along with that of other artists) was used by Cadburys, the chocolate manufacturer, on the cover of their chocolate boxes from the 1860s onwards. Printed in 1861, The Carewes: a tale of the Civil Wars was the swashbuckling royalist family history of a gentry on the edge of Windsor Forest, illustrated with fine images and a dashing flourish; it was much appreciated in America. "the dainty water-colour drawings executed...appeal to the majority of the British public more than the works of any other." So wrote H.M. Cundall in 1906 in the preface to a first biography.

He became ill in 1893 and moved to Weybridge. He continued painting, but died on 27 March 1899. He is buried at All Saints' Church in Witley.

== Friends and family ==
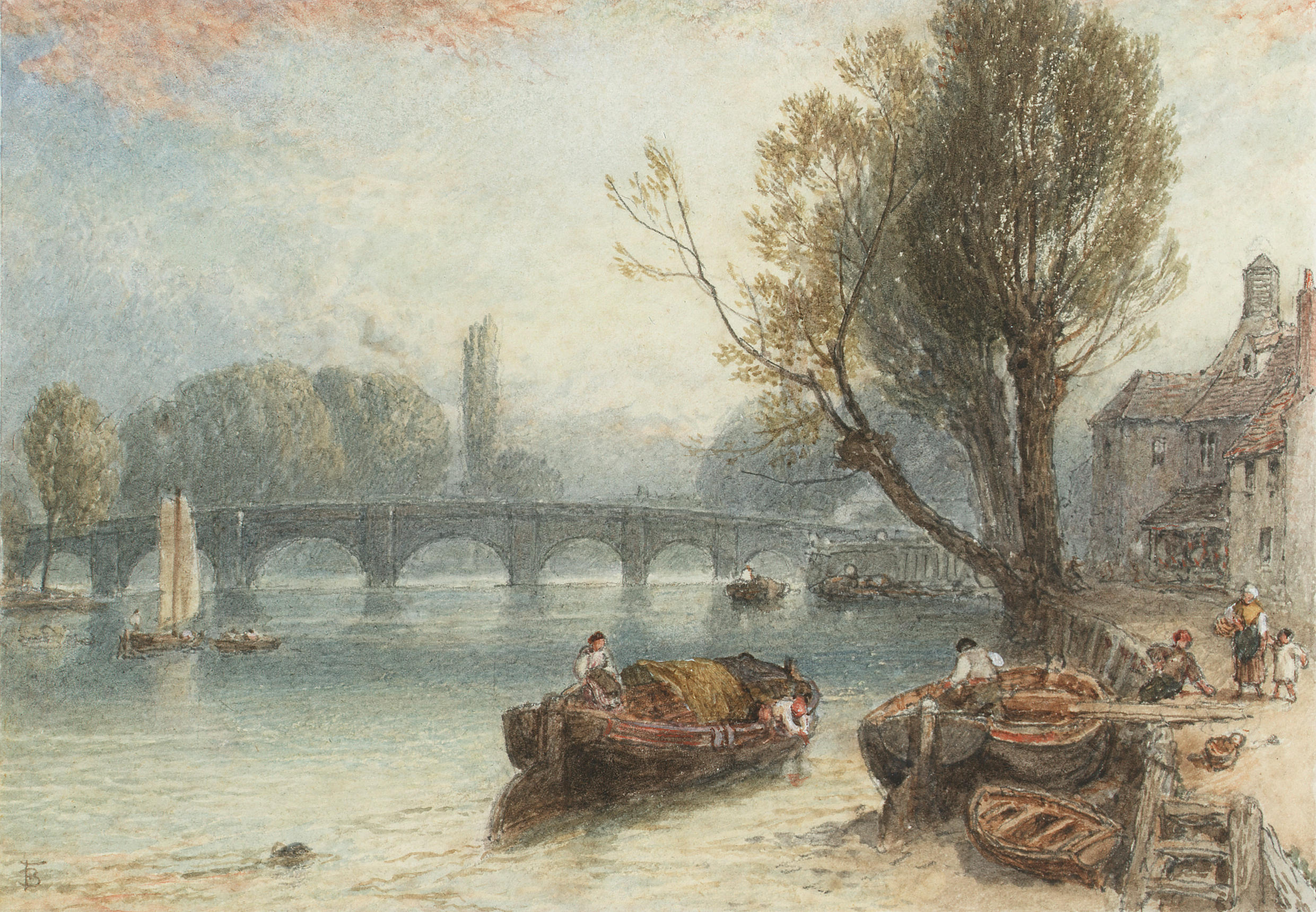
Kew Bridge from Strand on the Green

As well as Edward Burne-Jones and William Morris, his artist friends and associates included Fred Walker, Charles Keene and William Quiller Orchardson.

A Shop at Dol

In 1864, he married Frances, the daughter of Dawson Watson, and sister of the artist John Dawson Watson. Their eldest son, also called Myles Birket Foster (29 November 1851–18 December 1922), was an organist, composer and writer on music who studied at the Royal College of Music with Sullivan, Prout and Frederick Westlake. He was organist and choirmaster in Marylebone and at the Foundling Hospital Chapel among other places, and music director at the publisher Boosey & Hawkes. He composed symphonies, overtures, children's cantatas, a string quartet, trios and church music, and wrote a History of the Philharmonic Society (1913). Birket Foster resided at 14 Woodstock Road, Acton.

== Bibliography ==
Illustrated by Foster

- Beattie, James, The Minstrel; or, The Progress of Genisus, (George Routledge, 1858)
- Cowper, William, The Task; A Poem, (James Nisbet & Co, 1855)
- Falconer, William, The Shipwreck; A Poem, (Adam and Charles Black, 1858)
- Foster, Myles Birket. Beauties of English Landscape (Routledge, Warne & Routledge, 1862).
- Gillies, Mary. The Carewes: A Tale of the Civil Wars (W. Kent & Co, 1861).
- Gray, Thomas, The Poetical Works of Thomas Gray, (Bickers & Son, 1859)
- Miller, Thomas, Common Wayside Flowers, (George Routledge, 1860)
- Taylor, Tom. Birket Foster's pictures of English landscape (George Routledge & sons, 1874).
- Wordsworth, William. The Deserted Cottage (George Routledge & Co., 1859).
- Wordsworth, William. Poetical Works (G. Routledge, 1858).

About Foster

- Cundall, Herbert Minton. Birket Foster, R. W. S (A & C Black, 1906); with colour plates.
- Cundall, Herbert Minton. Birket Foster, sixteen examples in colour of the artist's work (A. & C. Black, 1910).
- Lewis, Frank. Birket Foster (Leigh on Sea: Lewis, 1973).
- Reynolds, Jan. Myles Birket Foster (London: Batsford, 1984).
