= Sharon Lohr =

American statistician

Sharon Lynn Lohr is an American statistician. She is an Emeritus Dean’s Distinguished Professor of Statistics at Arizona State University, and an independent statistical consultant. Her research interests include survey sampling, design of experiments, and applications of statistics in education and criminology.

== Education and career ==
Lohr graduated from Calvin College in 1982. She completed her Ph.D. in statistics in 1987 at the University of Wisconsin–Madison. Her dissertation, Accurate Multivariate Estimation Using Double and Triple Sampling, was supervised by Mark Finster.

After retiring from Arizona State, she served a five-year term as vice president and senior statistician at Westat.

== Books ==
Lohr is the author of:

- Sampling: Design and Analysis (Duxbury Press, 1999; 2nd ed., Cengage/CRC Press, 2010)
- Measuring Crime: Behind the Statistics (CRC Press, 2019)

== Recognition ==
Lohr is a Fellow of the American Statistical Association and an elected member of the International Statistical Institute. In 2003 she became the inaugural winner of the Gertrude M. Cox Award of the Washington Statistical Society.
