= Franz von Löher =

German historian (1818–1892)

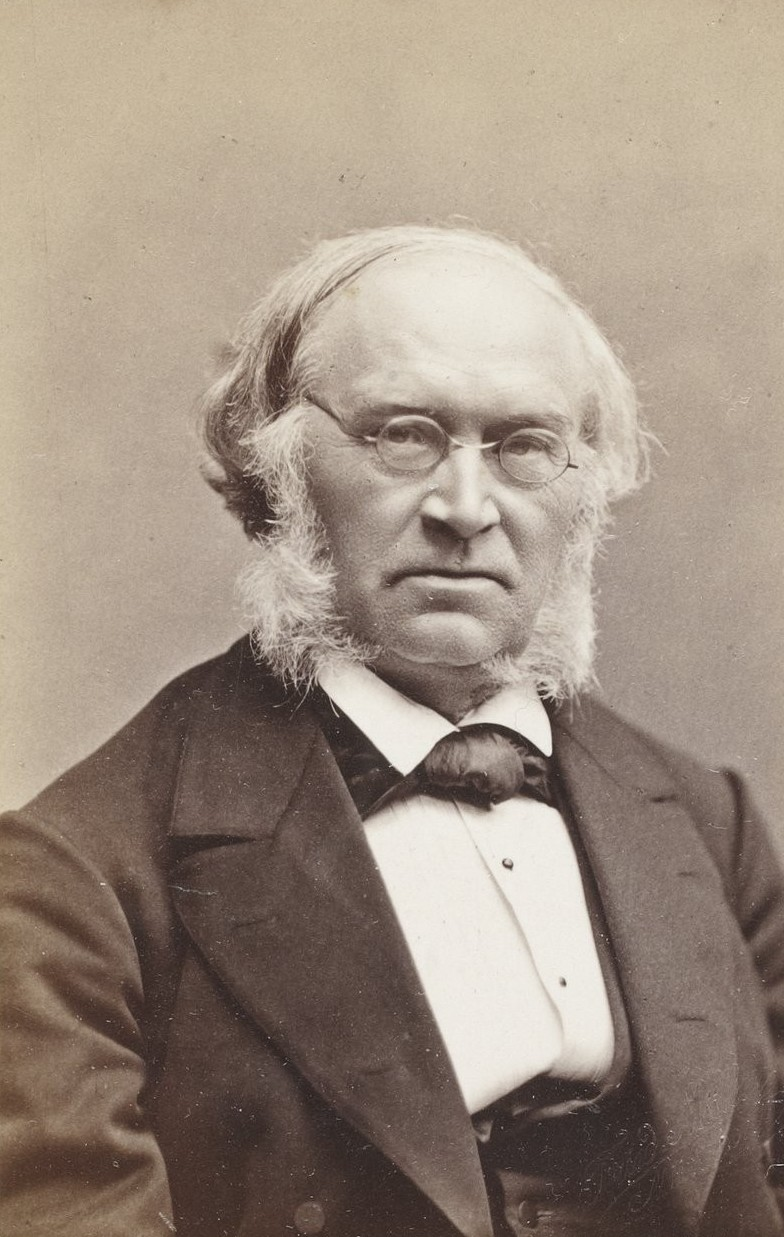
von Löher in 1876

Franz von Löher (15 October 1818, Paderborn, Westphalia – 1 March 1892, Munich) numbered among the democrats during the revolutions of 1848 in Germany. He was a German jurist and historian. He toured the United States extensively.

== Biography ==
He studied law, history, natural science, and art at the University of Halle, the Ludwig-Maximilians-Universität München, the University of Freiburg, and the Friedrich Wilhelm University of Berlin, and traveled extensively in Europe, Canada, and the United States 1846–1847. The end of his travels in the United States found him in Cincinnati where he remained for seven months. Here, he held some public presentations on "the significance of the German people in world history." Later he gathered these presentations together and published them as Geschichte und Zustände der Deutschen in Amerika (History and condition of the Germans in America; Cincinnati, 1848). As it was the first time such a book had appeared in Ohio, it made its author very popular; one passage in the book is also a likely source of the Muhlenberg legend that German almost became the official language of the United States. He left for home 2 October 1847.

On his return to Germany, he took an active part in the political uprising of 1848. He founded the Westphälische Zeitung, and was imprisoned by the government for political agitation, but was shortly afterward acquitted after a trial. In 1849, he became assessor of the court of appeal in Paderborn, and was afterward professor in the universities of Munich and Göttingen.

Among his other works are Aussichten für gebildete Deutsche in Amerika (The prospects for educated Germans in America; Berlin, 1853); and Land und Leute in der alten und neuen Welt (Lands and people of the Old and New Worlds; 3 vols., 1857-1858).
