= Frederick Westlake =

English pianist and composer

- Born: 25 February 1840
- Died: 12 February 1898 (aged 57)

Frederick Westlake (25 February 1840 in Romsey, Hampshire – 12 February 1898 in London) was an English pianist and composer.

Westlake studied at the Royal Academy of Music with W. Macfarren (piano) and G. A. Macfarren (harmony); in 1862 was appointed to the faculty as piano teacher. He wrote several Masses, hymns, piano pieces, and a collection of part-songs, Lyra Studentium.

The composer Hermann Löhr studied piano with Westlake whilst attending the Royal Academy of Music.
