= George Augustus Löhr =

British composer and organist

George Augustus Löhr (20 April 1821 – 20 August 1897) was an organist and composer based in England.

== Life ==
Born in Norwich, he was educated at Magdalen College, Oxford where he was a chorister and then at Leipzig University and at the Ludwig-Maximilians-Universität München. He then became assistant organist at Norwich Cathedral under the organist Zechariah Buck.

He was appointed to St Margaret's Church, Leicester in 1845, a position he held for the next four decades until his death. He pioneered choral services there and was one of the earliest to promote musical harvest festivals. The church "soon became famous for its choir". Lohr also established and conducted the Leicester Harmonic Society in 1856. It survived until 1883. From 1881, he was a music professor. Lohr composed the hymn "St Francis", setting the words "Fountain of good, to own Thy love" by Philip Doddridge. His four part arrangement of Mendelssohn's "But This Lord is Mindful of His Own" (from the oratorio St Paul) remains in print.

He died on 20 August 1897 and is buried in the Welford Road Cemetery in Leicester.

His youngest son, Richard Harvey Löhr, was born in Leicester in 1856 and studied at the Royal Academy of Music under William Henry Holmes, Ebenezer Prout and Sir Arthur Sullivan. He twice won the Charles Lucas medal (in 1877 and 1878). He was the organist at St James's Church, Marylebone. Harvey Löhr composed five symphonies, two piano concertos, orchestral suites, marches and preludes, the operas A Border Raid (1883) and Kenilworth (1906), choral works (such as the oratorio The Queen of Sheba, 1900), chamber music (including the Piano Quartet, op 15, c 1980), piano pieces and many songs. His manuscripts are held at the Royal Academy. He died in Hastings on 16 January 1927.
