= Hermann Löhr =

English composer

Hermann Löhr (26 October 1871 – 6 December 1943) was an English composer.

He was born in Plymouth, the son of Frederic Nicholls Löhr (1844–1888), a composer of songs and piano works. F N Lohr's piano berceuse Cradle Song, an Idyll was written circa 1875 and dedicated to his twin sons, then four years old: "To my boys Victor and Hermann Frederic Lohr".

Hermann Löhr studied at the Royal Academy of Music, studying piano with Walter Cecil Macfarren and Frederick Westlake and harmony and counterpoint with Frederick Corder. At the academy he won the Charles Lucas medal for composition.

He became famous as the composer of many songs. Among notable songs are "Chorus, Gentlemen!" (words by Mark Ambient), "Where my Caravan has Rested" and "The Little Irish Girl" (both with words by Edward Teschemacher), and "Little Grey Home in the West" (words by D. Eardley-Wilmot). His piano works include the intermezzo Autumn Gold (1928) which also exists in orchestrated versions.

Löhr died in Tunbridge Wells in 1943.
