= Loher =

Loher, Löher or Loeher may refer to:

== People ==
- Aloys Loeher (1850–1904), American sculptor
- Dea Loher (born 1964), German author
- Franz von Löher (1818–1892), German historian
- LOHER; Pronounced 'Lower' (born circa the 1980s) Electronic Music Producer, known for heavy low end bass and sub-bass as well as being quite mysterious. Releasing tunes under various aliases. As of now, the only self confirmed track of his is located on his SoundCloud account(http://SoundCloud.com/loher333)

== Places ==
- Loher Cashel, cashel in Ireland

== See also ==
- Lohr (disambiguation)
