= National Breast Cancer Foundation (United States) =

American charitable organization

The National Breast Cancer Foundation (NBCF) is a U.S. breast cancer organization that promotes breast cancer awareness and education, provides free screening services, and supports breast cancer patients and survivors.

NBCF was founded by Janelle Hail in 1991 after her own experience with surviving breast cancer, to provide information to breast cancer patients. The organization focuses heavily on education and early detection.

Through its National Mammography Program, NBCF provides free mammograms and diagnostic care services to underserved women by partnering with medical facilities across the U.S. It also partners with Convoy of Hope to provide breast cancer education and resources to women in need. NBCF provides a patient navigator program, HOPE Kits, metastatic breast cancer retreats, and online educational videos.

In addition, NBCF provides local and virtual support groups, a library of free educational guides, and in-person or virtual sessions about breast cancer awareness in the workplace.

There are many ways to get involved with the NBCF mission – from donating, volunteering, fundraising, shopping for a cause, or becoming a corporate partner.

Through its Game Pink fundraiser, professional video game players raise money for NBCF through live-streaming and in-person events.
