= Creigh Deeds 2009 gubernatorial campaign =

American political campaign

Deeds for Virginia
- Campaign: 2009 Virginia gubernatorial election
- Candidate: Robert Creigh Deeds; Virginia State Senator (since 2001); Virginia Delegate (1992–2001)
- Affiliation: Democratic Party
- Status: Lost election
- Receipts: (2008-01-31)

Website
- Deeds for Virginia

Creigh Deeds was the 2009 Democratic nominee for governor of Virginia. He had been a Virginia state senator since 2001, and was the Democratic Party's nominee for attorney general of Virginia in 2005. He announced his candidacy for governor on December 13, 2007, in an online video. His primary opposition for the Democratic nomination was former Virginia House of Delegates member Brian Moran and former DNC chairman Terry McAuliffe. Deeds won the nomination by a large margin, taking about 50 percent of the vote in the June 9, 2009 Democratic primary. However, Deeds lost the gubernatorial race held on November 3, to Bob McDonnell, 41.25% to 58.61%.

== Background ==
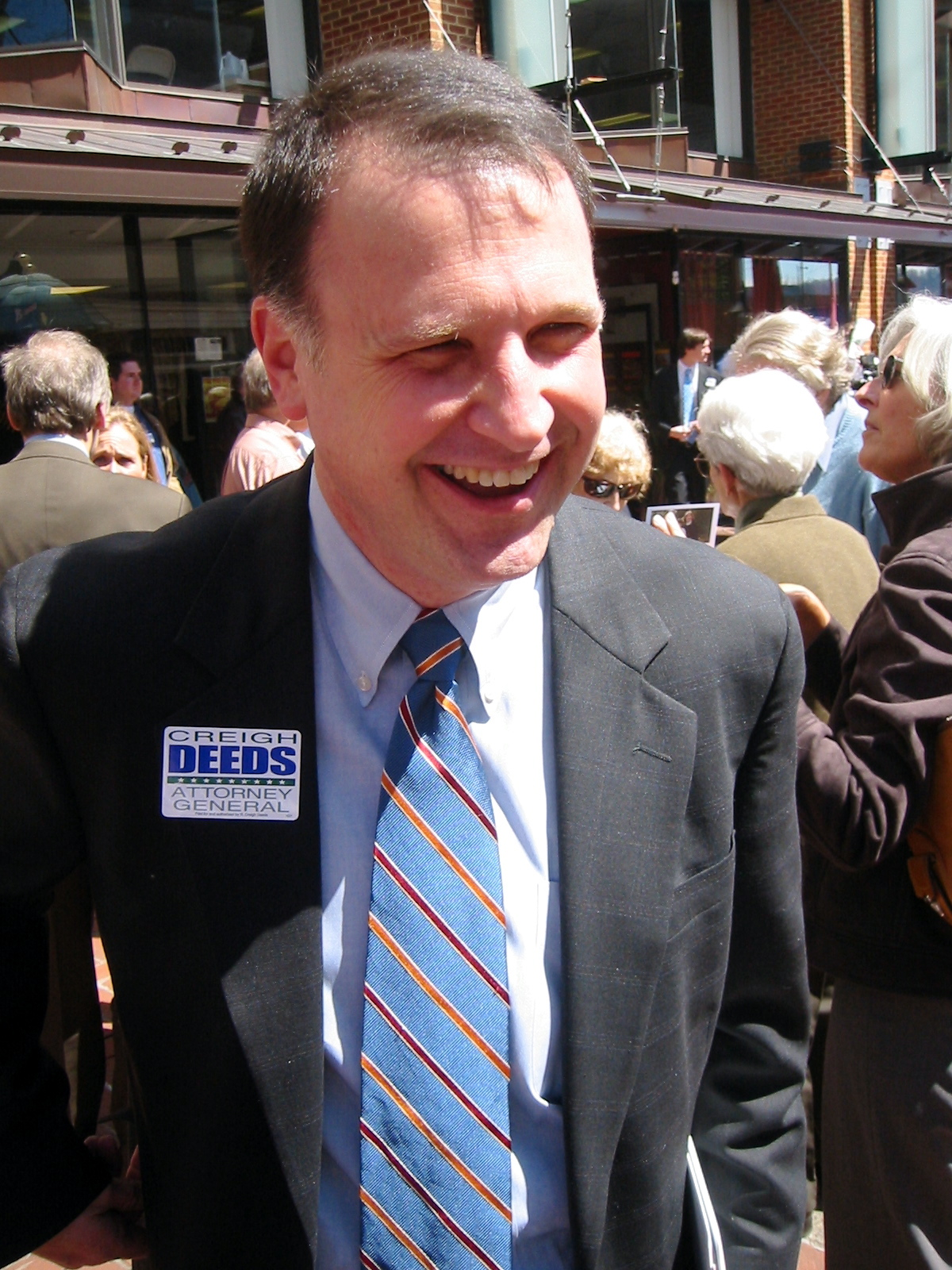

Creigh Deeds had been a member of the Virginia House of Delegates from 1991 to 2001, and had been a member of the state senate since he won a special election in the 25th district in 2001.

=== Positions ===
Deeds cast himself as a centrist upon entering the race, due to his stances on gun control, the death penalty, and gay marriage.

=== Key personnel ===
- Joe Abbey - campaign manager
- Brooke Borkenhagen - communications director
- Peter Jackson - senior communications advisor

== Primary campaign ==
=== Timeline ===
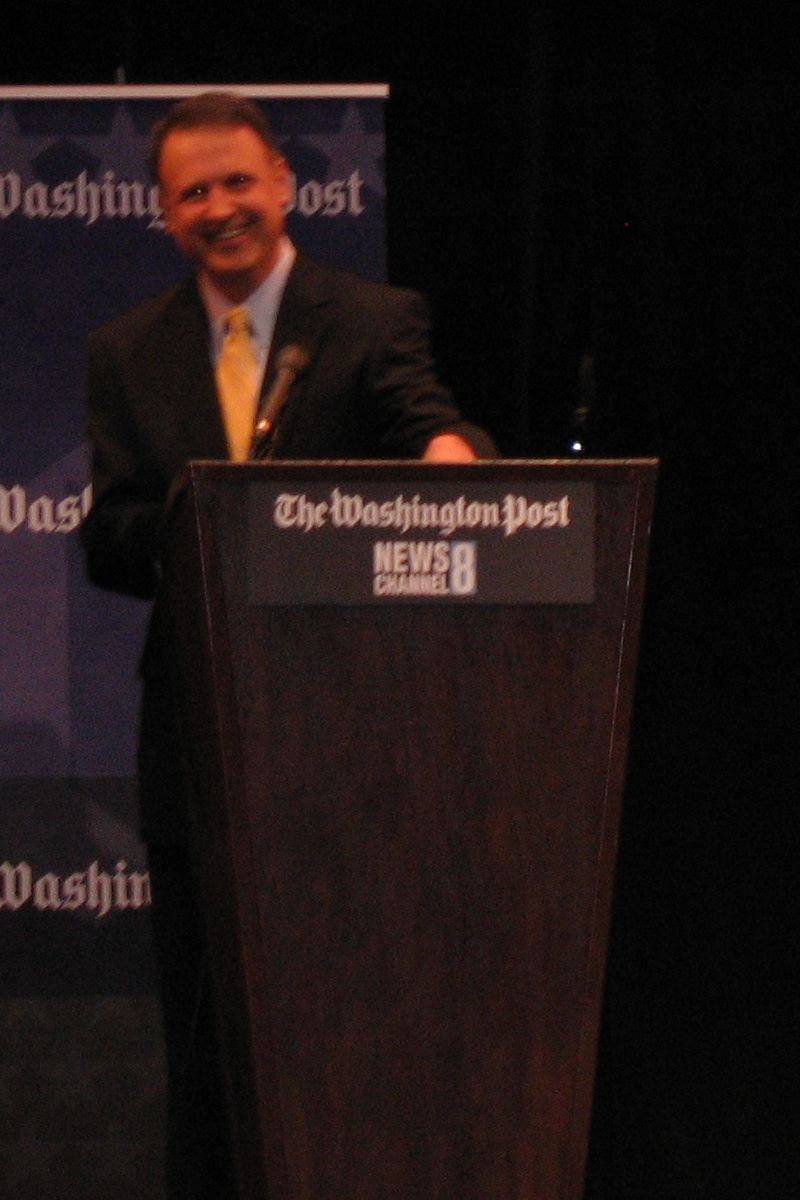
Deeds at the campus of Northern Virginia Community College, participating in a Washington Post debate

Deeds announced his candidacy in December 2007. He was soon joined by Delegate Brian Moran, who announced on January 3, 2008.

Initially, Deeds built up momentum, having lost the race for attorney general in 2005 by just 323 votes. His strategy was to campaign to the governor's mansion through his position in the Virginia State Senate by proposing several favorable legislative actions, including a measure to give a $10,000 tax credit to businesses that made "job creating investments", and eliminating the sales tax on renewable energy purchases.

Deeds picked up several major endorsements early in the race, such as The International Police Union and (then) Charlottesville Mayor David Brown.

Deeds, along with fellow gubernatorial candidates, participated in the Virginia Capitol Correspondents Association dinner.

Deeds was prohibited from raising funds during the 2009 session of the Virginia General Assembly. It was difficult for him to campaign, as he was predominately on the Senate Floor a majority of the time during the session. Deeds returned to the campaign trail in March and began his "Commonwealth Conversations Tour". His campaign made stops in Bristol, Roanoke, and other cities.

Deeds announced his first quarter fundraising totals on April 9, 2009. Due to the fact that he participated in the legislative session, his fundraising totals were less than those of McAuliffe and Moran. Deeds raised approximately $600,000, compared to $800,000 by Moran and $4.2 million by McAuliffe. Deeds reported that he had $1.2 million cash on hand, compared to Moran's $824,000, and that 97% of his contributions came from in-state, compared to 90% for Moran and 18% for McAuliffe.

In early May 2009, Deeds laid off several campaign staffers, in order to keep airing television ads. After the layoffs, he had 25 staffers across the state and six offices in Charlottesville, Richmond, Hampton Roads, Roanoke, Southside and Northern Virginia.

In late May 2009, Deeds began gaining momentum, according to various polling results. This was due in part to the Washington Post's endorsement of Deeds on May 22.

=== Polling ===
Source	Dates administered	Terry McAuliffe	Brian Moran	Creigh Deeds
Survey USA	June 8	30%	21%	42%
Public Policy Polling	June 6–7	26%	24%	40%
Suffolk University	June 4	20%	20%	27%
Daily Kos/Research 2000	June 1–3	26%	27%	30%
Survey USA	May 31 June 2	35%	26%	29%
Public Policy Polling	May 28–31	24%	22%	27%
Public Policy Polling	May 19–21, 2009	29%	20%	20%
Daily Kos/Research 2000	May 18–20, 2009	36%	22%	13%
Survey USA	May 17–19, 2009	37%	22%	26%
Public Policy Polling	May 1–3, 2009	30%	20%	14%
Survey USA	April 25–27, 2009	38%	22%	22%
Research 2000	April 6–8, 2009	19%	24%	16%
Public Policy Polling	March 27–29, 2009	18%	22%	15%
Public Policy Polling	February 28–March 1, 2009	21%	19%	14%
Public Policy Polling	January 30–February 1, 2009	18%	18%	11%

In early results of the three polls taken of the primary race, Deeds registered at third place. He was also the only candidate prohibited from campaigning due to the January/February session of the General Assembly, which took him off the campaign trail. The March poll by Public Policy Polling (PPP) showed Deeds at 15%, 3 points behind McAuliffe's 18%, and 7 points behind Moran's 22%. Deeds also led with independent voters 21%19% over Moran, according to the PPP poll released on March 31, 2009.

During late May 2009, several polls showed Deeds gaining ground. These included Survey USA, showing Deeds at 26%.

The first time Deeds led in a poll after Terry McAuliffe's entrance was on June 2, 2009, when PPP announced the results of its second-to-last primary poll. It showed Deeds leading with 27%, followed by 24% for McAuliffe and 22% for Moran.

=== Grassroots support ===
Deeds maintained thorough grassroots support throughout the 2009 campaign. This included ground support at debates as well a rallies and phone-banks throughout his' campaign offices. He maintained his campaign headquarters in Charlottesville, where the campaign organized phone banking and other activities.

Deeds offered blogger "badges" to identify blogger support for his campaign. Several prominent Virginian bloggers endorsed Deeds, such as Kenneth Bernstein, Alan Zimmerman, and others.

=== Advertising ===
Deeds' campaign manager Joe Abbey announced the campaign's decision to go on air via an email sent to supporters. This email contained a link to an ad, as well as a link to donate to "Contribute... To keep Creigh's ad on the air", in his words. The same day, the Deeds Campaign announced their decision to purchase air time on four major media markets: Bristol, Richmond, Hampton Roads, and Roanoke, Virginia

The two campaign advertisements, entitled "Education Story" and "Most Qualified", feature Deeds and others in front of a white background, with a narrator discussing Deeds' issues/plans.

Creigh Deeds: Growing up, we didn't have much, but education was always a priority. My Mom sent me off to college with just 4 twenty bills, so I know that that education is the best investment Virginia can make for our children and for our future...

— Deeds in the beginning of his ad entitled "Education Story"

Announcer: The Democrat most qualified to be our next governor: Creigh Deeds. A prosecutor who wrote Megan's Law to protect our children. The leader who stood with Governors Warner and Kaine to protect our public schools and colleges. And now, a detailed plan to rebuild our economy with innovative investments in transportation, local schools, and higher education...

— Announcer in Deeds' second ad, entitled "Most Qualified"

=== June 9 primary ===
Democratic primary results by county and independent city: Deeds: Deeds—30–40%; Deeds—40–50%; Deeds—50–60%; Deeds—60–70%; Deeds—70–80%; Deeds—80–90%; Deeds—90–100%; McAuliffe: McAuliffe—30–40%; McAuliffe—40–50%; McAuliffe—50–60%; Moran: Moran—30–40%; Moran—40–50%; Moran—50–60%

The State of Virginia held its primary election on June 9, 2009, with polls open from 6 am to 7 pm. Turnout was expected from anywhere between 185,000 to 300,000.

Not Larry Sabato projected in Crystal Ball, Creigh Deeds winning the Democratic primary at 7:29 PM, followed by FiveThirtyEight.com at 7:45, as well as the Associated Press around the same time.

Deeds won handily, amassing approximately 50% of the vote, to McAuliffe's and Moran's 26% and 24%, respectively. Deeds won in most geographic areas of the Commonwealth, including winning Arlington over Moran 47%-37%, and winning Virginia Beach over McAuliffe 46%-33%. Deeds won 10 out of Virginia's 11 congressional districts, including the one held by Moran's older brother, Congressman Jim Moran.

Virginia Democratic gubernatorial primary, 2009
Party	Candidate	Votes	%	±%
Democratic	Creigh Deeds	158,823	49.77%	
Democratic	Terry McAuliffe	84,462	26.45%	
Democratic	Brian Moran	75,824	23.77%	

== General election campaign ==
=== Timeline ===
After gaining the Democratic nomination, Deeds appeared alongside Governor Tim Kaine and former opponents Moran and McAuliffe at a Democratic Unity Event. Deeds also appeared with fellow running mates Jody Wagner and Steve Shannon in Williamsburg, Virginia, along with Senators Warner and Webb.

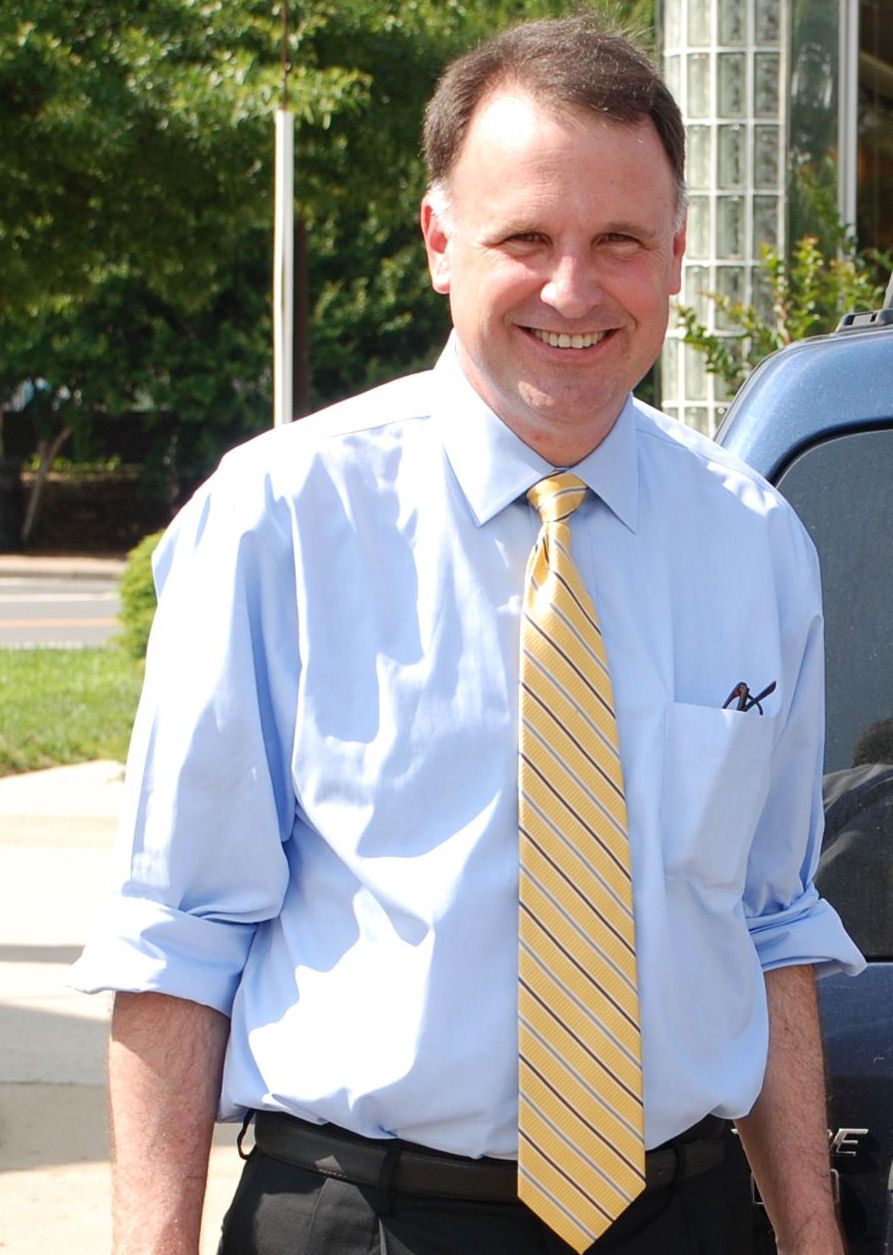
Deeds at a campaign stop in Arlington, Virginia

Throughout August, Deeds started a campaign tour entitled "Deeds Country" designed to garner votes from traditionally Republican swaths of the state. While this tour was praised by some, like Tom Jensen of Public Policy Polling, it was scorned by several Democratic bloggers such as Miles Grant, who said, "how many Obama voters are going to be fired up (ready to go) when they see Deeds driving a gas-guzzler down dusty rural roads?"

As the campaign headed into late August and early September, Deeds ranked further and further down in the polls, with PPP (D) showing Deeds -7%, Rasmussen showing -9%, and SurveyUSA showing -12% (see below). However, The Washington Post broke news of a graduate school master's thesis written by Bob McDonnell calling working women "detrimental" to the traditional family and criticizing the "purging" of religion from schools. Deeds and other Democrats began attacking McDonnell on his thesis, and several polls started showing the race tightening up. By mid-September, Rasmussen Reports had Deeds behind 48%–46%, while the Washington Post had him losing 51%–47% (see below).

However, Deeds' campaign failed to generate much traction, and was criticized for going too "negative". Many prominent Democrats close to the White House criticized Deeds for allegedly running away from President Obama. With anonymous Obama administration officials bashing Deeds for his lack of "coordination" with the White House and for straying from the favored campaign strategies of the president and incumbent governor Kaine, Deeds lost the general election 59%–41% to Bob McDonnell.

=== Fundraising ===
Fundraising period	Money raised	Money spent	Cash on hand
September	3.5 Million USD	5.1 Million USD	2.77 Million USD
July/August	3.48 Million USD	5.3 Million USD	4.4 Million USD

=== Polling ===
Source	Dates administered	Creigh Deeds (D)	Bob McDonnell (R)
SurveyUSA	October 17–19, 2009	40%	59%
Public Policy Polling	October 16–19, 2009	40%	52%
Clarus Research	October 18–19, 2009	41%	49%
CNU-Pilot-WVEC	October 19, 2009	31%	45%
Rasmussen Reports	October 12, 2009	43%	50%
Mason-Dixon	October 6–8, 2009	40%	48%
Washington Post	October 4–7, 2009	44%	53%
Survey USA	October 2–4, 2009	43%	54%
Rasmussen Reports	September 29, 2009	42%	51%
Survey USA	September 26–28, 2009	41%	55%
Public Policy Polling	September 25–28, 2009	43%	48%
Insider Advantage	September 23, 2009	44%	48%
Washington Post	September 20, 2009	47%	51%
Research 2000	September 14–16, 2009	43%	50%
Rasmussen Reports	September 16, 2009	46%	48%
Clarus Research Group	September 16, 2009	37%	42%
Survey USA	September 3, 2009	42%	54%
Rasmussen Reports	September 1, 2009	42%	51%
Public Policy Polling	August 28–31, 2009	42%	49%
Washington Post	August 16, 2009	40%	47%
Rasmussen Reports	August 10, 2009	38%	47%
Research 2000	August 3–5, 2009	43%	51%
Public Policy Polling	July 31 August 3, 2009	37%	51%
Survey USA	July 27–28, 2009	40%	55%
Rasmussen Reports	July 14, 2009	41%	44%
Public Policy Polling	June 30 July 2, 2009	43%	49%
Research 2000	June 15–17, 2009	44%	45%
ALR	June 10–14, 2009	42%	38%
Rasmussen Reports	June 10, 2009	47%	41%

The first poll released after Deeds secured the nomination by Rasmussen Reports had Deeds leading over Republican opponent Bob McDonnell 47%-41%. In the same survey, 42% said Deeds was more likely to win, while 34% said the same about McDonnell.

A Survey USA poll released in July showed McDonnell beating Deeds 55%–40%. However, this poll was cited as inaccurate by several, including Public Policy Polling, another polling firm.

=== Results ===
These results were current as of 1:30 PM Eastern on Thursday, November 17, with 100% of precincts reporting. McDonnell received the highest percentage of the vote for governor out of any candidate since 1961. He won the majority of the vote in all age groups, and bested Deeds in both the Asian and White demographics by large margins.

Virginia gubernatorial election, 2009
Party	Candidate	Votes	%
Republican	Bob McDonnell	1,163,523	59
Democratic	Creigh Deeds	818,909	41
Independent	Write-in candidates	2,509	0
Total votes		1,984,934	100
Turnout		1,984,934 of 4,955,755	40
Republican gain from Democratic		Swing	

== Endorsers ==
List of individuals and groups endorsing Creigh Deeds

Newspapers

- Bristol Herald Courier of Bristol, Virginia
- Martinsville Bulletin of Martinsville, Virginia
- The Washington Post of the Washington Metropolitan Area

Virginia state senators

- Senator Henry Marsh (D) of Petersburg
- Senator A. Donald McEachin (D) of Henrico County
- Senator Chap Petersen (D) of Fairfax
- Senator Phil Puckett (D) of Lebanon, Virginia
- Senator Roscoe Reynolds (D) of Martinsville
- Senate Majority Leader Richard Saslaw (D) of Fairfax
- Chairwoman of the Democratic Caucus Mary Margaret Whipple (D) of Arlington County

Virginia mayors

- Fmr. Charlottesville Mayor David Brown (D)
- Fmr. Richmond Mayor Walter T. Kenney (D)
- Charlottesville Mayor Dave Norris (D)

Unions

- Fairfax Coalition of Police
- Fairfax Deputy Sheriffs Coalition
- Virginia Education Association

Members of Congress

- Virginia's 9th congressional district Congressman Rick Boucher

Governors

- Linwood Holton (R), 61st governor of Virginia
- Tim Kaine (D), current governor of Virginia
- Mark Warner (D), 69th governor of Virginia

Political figures

- Leslie Byrne (D), 2005 losing Democratic lieutenant governor candidate
- Terry McAuliffe (D), former DNC chairman and Losing 2009 Democratic gubernatorial primary candidate
- Brian Moran (D), former Virginia state delegate and losing 2009 Democratic gubernatorial primary candidate
- Barack Obama (D), president of the United States

== See also ==
- 2009 Bob McDonnell gubernatorial campaign
