= Electoral history of Creigh Deeds =

List of elections featuring Creigh Deeds as a candidate

The electoral history of Creigh Deeds, Virginia State Senator.

== House of Delegates races ==
General election for Virginia House of Delegates, 2001
Party	Candidate	Votes	%	±%
Democratic	Creigh Deeds (incumbent)		77.7	
Independent	Kathleen Orion		22.3	

General election for Virginia House of Delegates, 1999
Party	Candidate	Votes	%	±%
Democratic	Creigh Deeds (incumbent)		74.3	
Republican	Michael Collins		25.6	

General election for Virginia House of Delegates, 1997
Party	Candidate	Votes	%	±%
Democratic	Creigh Deeds (incumbent)		85.3	
Independent	Kathleen Orion		14.4	

General election for Virginia House of Delegates, 1995
Party	Candidate	Votes	%	±%
Democratic	Creigh Deeds (incumbent)		72.2	
Republican	BW Nicely		24.3	

General election for Virginia House of Delegates, 1993
Party	Candidate	Votes	%	±%
Democratic	Creigh Deeds (incumbent)		99.7	

General election for Virginia House of Delegates, 1991
Party	Candidate	Votes	%	±%
Democratic	Creigh Deeds		57.1	
Republican	Emmett Hanger (Incumbent)		42.9	

== State Senate races ==
2023 Senate of Virginia General Election, 11th District
Party	Candidate	Votes	%	±%
Democratic	Creigh Deeds	48,675	65.61	−1.9
Republican	Phillip A. Hamilton	25,416	34.26	
Write-in	Various	100	0.13	

2023 Senate of Virginia Democratic Primary, 11th District
Party	Candidate	Votes	%	±%
Democratic	Creigh Deeds	13,623	50.9	
Democratic	Sally L. Hudson	13,158	49.1	

2019 Senate of Virginia General Election, 25th District
Party	Candidate	Votes	%	±%
Democratic	Creigh Deeds (incumbent)	44,778	67.50	−29.7
Independent	Elliott M. Harding	21,319	32.14	

2015 Senate of Virginia General Election, 25th District
Party	Candidate	Votes	%	±%
Democratic	Creigh Deeds (incumbent)	34,419	97.2	+32.8

2011 Senate of Virginia General Election, 25th District
Party	Candidate	Votes	%	±%
Democratic	Creigh Deeds (incumbent)	32,409	64.41	−34.38%
Republican	TJ Aldous	17,862	35.49	

2007 Senate of Virginia General Election, 25th District
Party	Candidate	Votes	%	±%
Democratic	Creigh Deeds (incumbent)	33,339	98.79	+0.40

2003 Senate of Virginia General Election, 25th District
Party	Candidate	Votes	%	±%
Democratic	Creigh Deeds (incumbent)	25,015	98.39	+29.59

2001 Senate of Virginia Special Election, 25th District
Party	Candidate	Votes	%	±%
Democratic	Creigh Deeds	20,094	68.8	
Republican	Jane Maddux	9,117	31.2	

== Statewide races ==
General election for Virginia Attorney General, 2005
Party	Candidate	Votes	%	±%
Republican	Bob McDonnell	970,886	49.96	−10.1%
Democratic	Creigh Deeds	970,563	49.95	+10.03%

2009 Virginia Gubernatorial Democratic Primary results
Democratic	Creigh Deeds	159,324	49.73
Democratic	Terry McAuliffe	84,640	26.41
Democratic	Brian Moran	76,405	23.84
Party	Candidate	Votes	%
Invalid or blank votes			
Total votes		320,369	100
Turnout			6.32

Virginia gubernatorial election, 2009
Party	Candidate	Votes	%
Republican	Bob McDonnell	1,163,498	58.61
Democratic	Creigh Deeds	818,875	41.25
Independent	Write-in candidates	2,509	0.12
Total votes		1,984,882	100.00
Turnout		1,984,882 of 4,955,755	40.05
Republican gain from Democratic		Swing	
