= Mame Reiley =

Mary Anne "Mame" Reiley (December 24, 1952 – June 2, 2014) was an American political activist and business leader.

Before her death, she was president of The Reiley Group, a consulting, fundraising and events communication agency. She was a veteran political organizer in the Democratic Party who moved with ease in both Virginian and U.S. national political circles.

== Civic engagement ==
As head of The Reiley Group, she consulted for Race for the Cure in Washington, D.C., and the Democratic Congressional Campaign Committee. As another part of her civic engagement, she was a member of the Economic Club of Washington and the Federal City Council Executive Committee. Also, she was active with the Metropolitan Washington Airports Authority as past chairman of the Authority and as chairman of the board's Dulles Corridor Committee.

== National role ==
Reiley held a wide number of posts in various organizations. She was elected to the Democratic National Committee from Virginia in 1992, serving as Chair of the Women's Caucus, and also served on the executive committee as well as the Rules and Bylaws Committee. On the Presidential level, she helped with former Virginia Governor Doug Wilder's 1992 primary exploratory campaign in New Hampshire and Mark Warner's national Forward Together PAC. In the 2008 Democratic presidential nomination process, Mame Reiley served as a superdelegate who pledged her support for Hillary Clinton.

== Virginia politics ==
Reiley was instrumental in persuading (then) Mayor of Alexandria Jim Moran to run for Congress in 1989, later serving as his campaign manager during the campaign, and eventually serving as his chief of staff on the Hill from 1991 to 1996. Beginning in 2001, she served as the political director of then Governor Mark Warner's VA PAC, One Virginia, and then as a senior advisor to Virginia Governor Tim Kaine. She was also the general manager of WashingtonInc/Production Group International, an events planning firm in Rosslyn, 1996–2001. She was the director of Virginians for Brian Moran, which supported Brian Moran in his unsuccessful election bid for governor of Virginia.
