= 2009 Virginia gubernatorial election =

- November 3, 2009
- Turnout: 40.4% ▼4.6
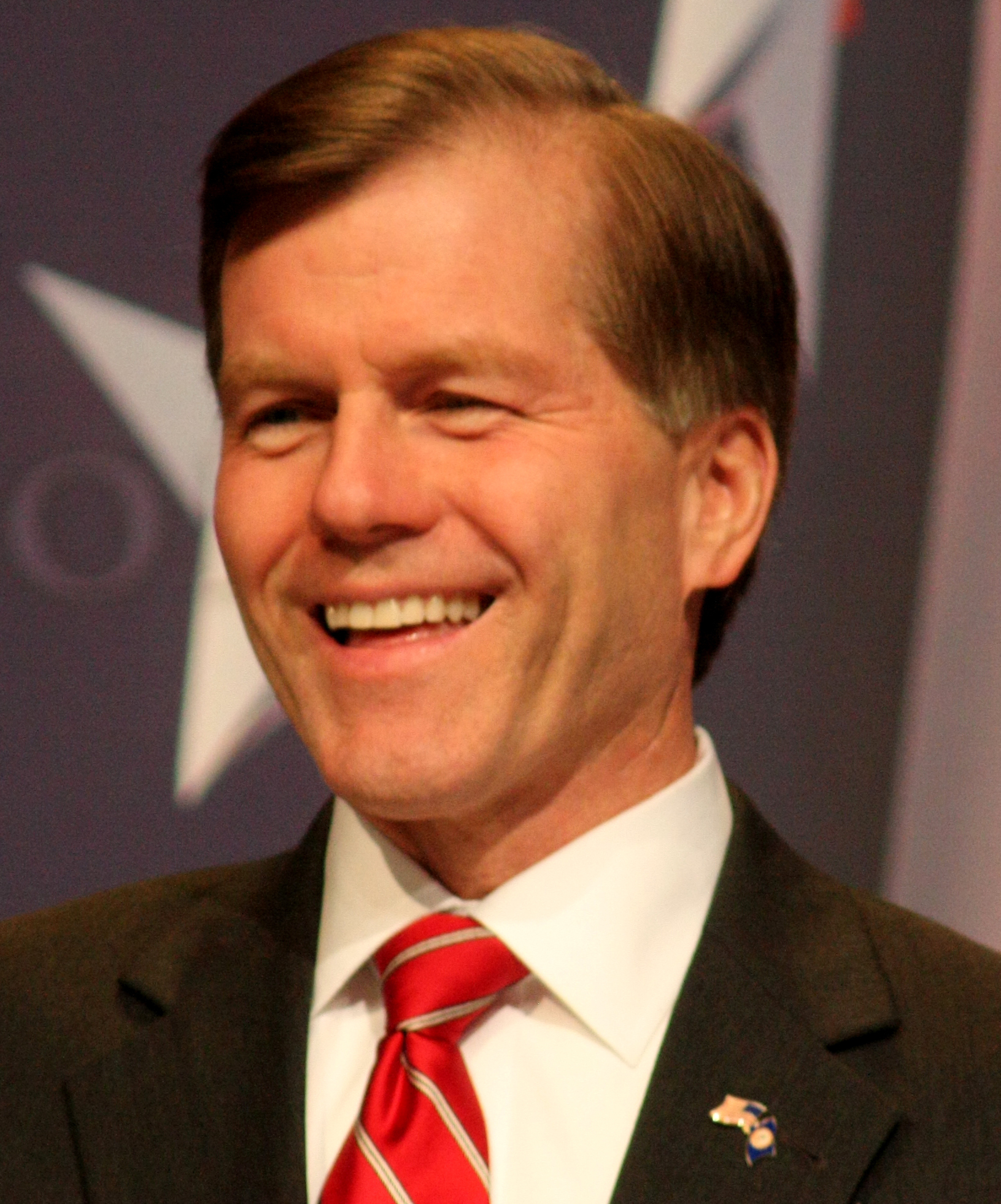

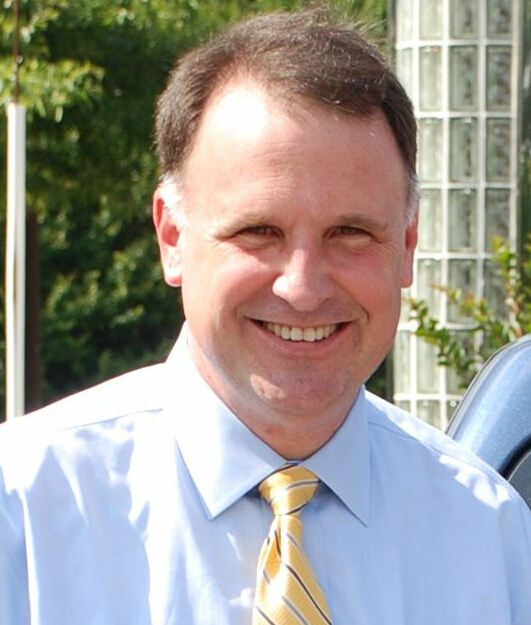
Nominee	Bob McDonnell	Creigh Deeds
Party	Republican	Democratic
Popular vote	1,163,651	818,950
Percentage	58.61%	41.25%
- McDonnell: 40–50% 50–60% 60–70% 70–80% 80–90% >90% Deeds: 40–50% 50–60% 60–70% 70–80% 80–90% >90%
Governor before election
Tim Kaine
Democratic
Elected Governor
Bob McDonnell
Republican

The 2009 Virginia gubernatorial election was held on November 3, 2009, to elect the next governor of Virginia. The election was held concurrently with other elections for Virginia's statewide offices, the House of Delegates, and other United States offices. Incumbent Democratic Governor Tim Kaine was ineligible to run for re-election, as the Constitution of Virginia prohibits its governors from serving consecutive terms. Republican Bob McDonnell was elected as governor as part of a Republican sweep. Republican Bill Bolling was reelected as lieutenant governor, and Republican Ken Cuccinelli was elected as attorney general. The winners were inaugurated on January 16, 2010, and served until January 11, 2014.

State Senator Creigh Deeds was selected as the Democratic nominee, having defeated former Democratic National Committee Chair Terry McAuliffe and former state Delegate Brian Moran in the Democratic primary election. This was the first contested Democratic primary in two decades. McDonnell, a former state attorney general, was selected at his party's nominating convention. The two major candidates competed in the 2005 Virginia attorney general election, and were in a rematch, but in the Governor's race. McDonnell defeated Deeds in the general election by a margin of 59%–41%, much larger than in the previous attorney general election.

This was the last time until 2021 that a Republican won any statewide election in Virginia. This is also the last time any of the following counties have voted Republican in a statewide race: Albemarle, Fairfax, Prince William, Henrico, Sussex, Brunswick, and the independent city of Suffolk. Additionally, this was the last gubernatorial election in Virginia to be decided by double digits until 2025, and it remains the last time that Republicans did so as of 2026.

== Democratic primary ==
=== Candidates ===
- Terry McAuliffe, former chairman of the Democratic National Committee and chair of the Hillary Clinton 2008 presidential campaign
- Creigh Deeds, state senator from Warm Springs
- Brian Moran, former state delegate from Alexandria
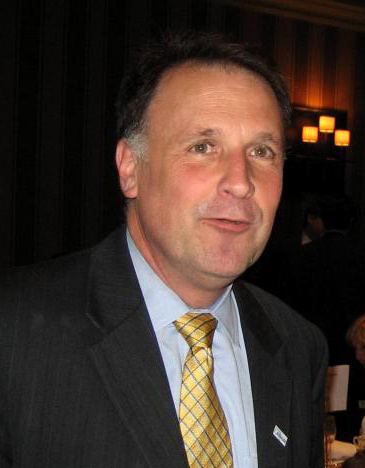
State Senator Creigh Deeds (campaign article)

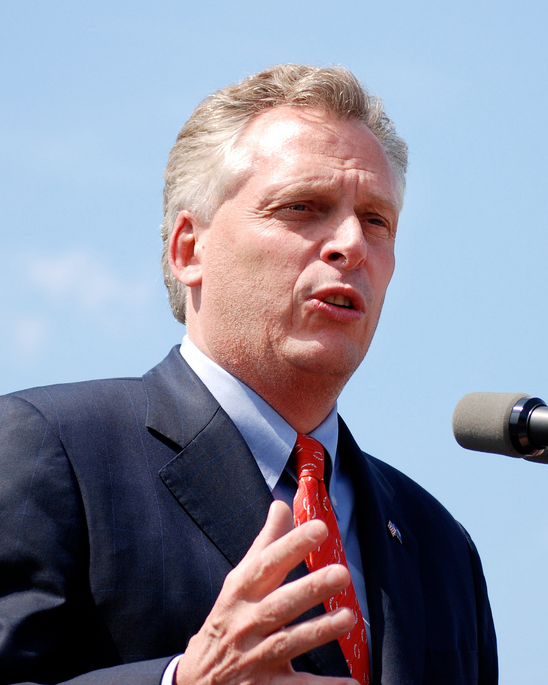
Former Democratic National Committee Chair Terry McAuliffe

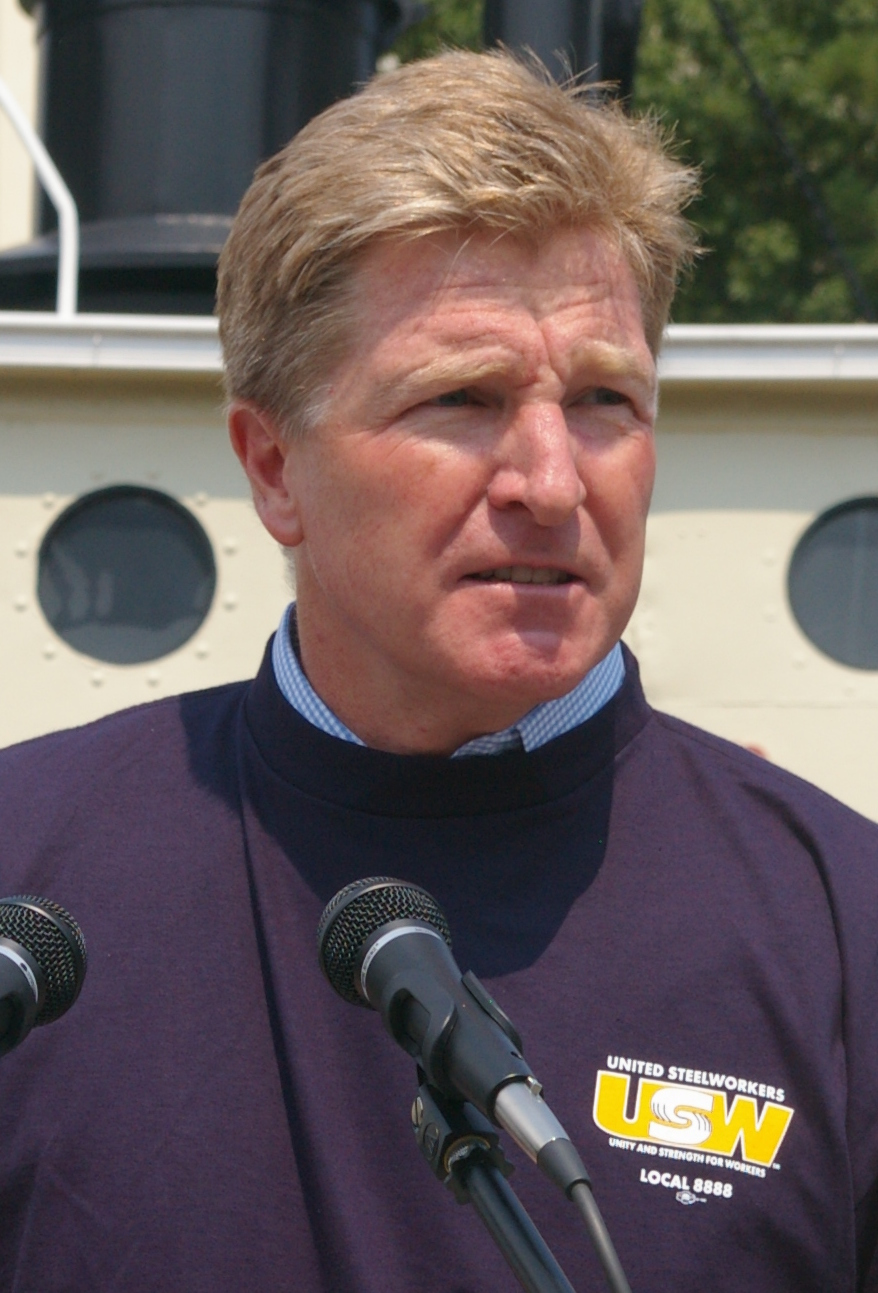
Former State Delegate Brian Moran

=== Campaign ===
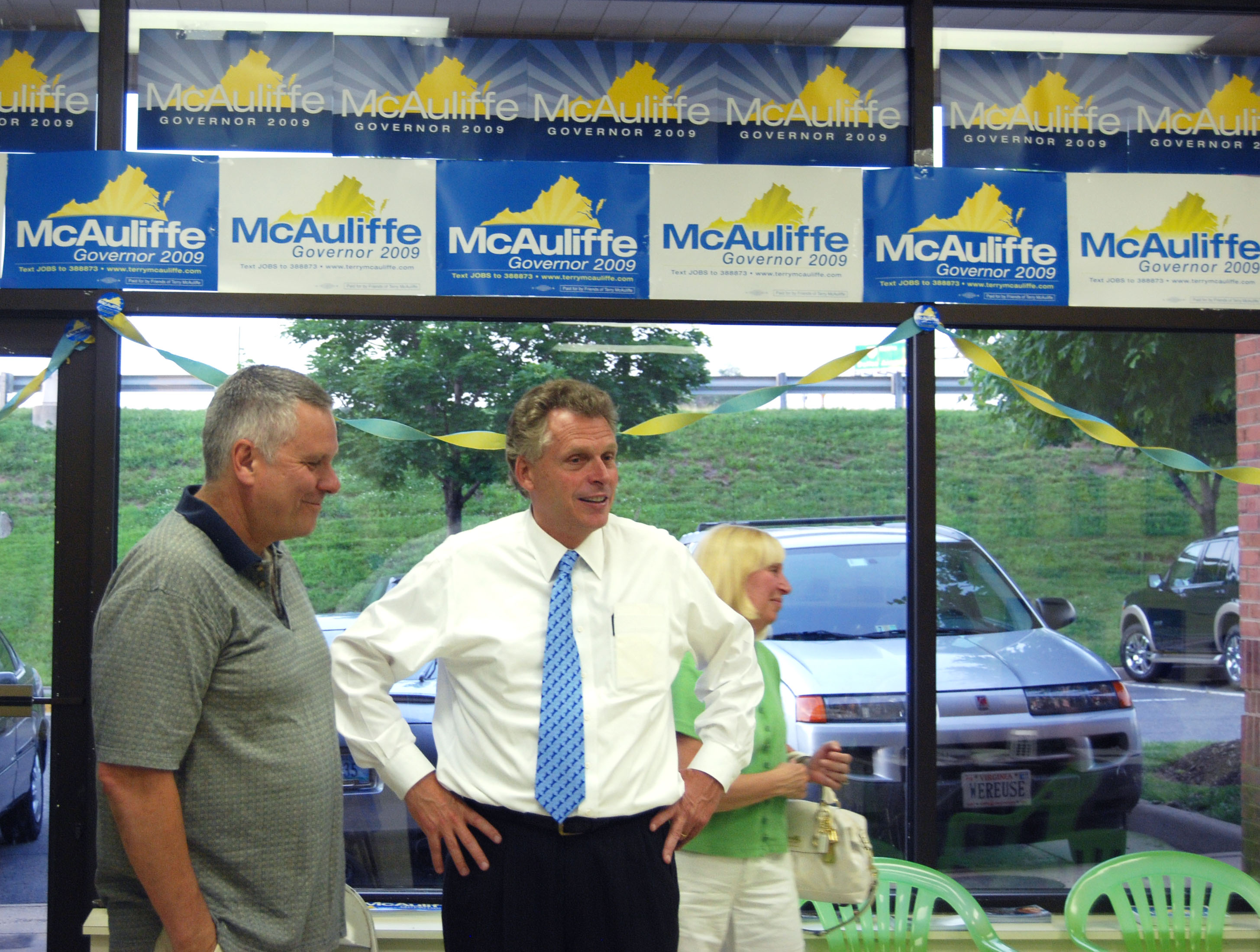
McAuliffe campaigning

The Democratic primary campaign for governor unofficially began on December 13, 2007, when State Senator Creigh Deeds, who ran for attorney general of Virginia in 2005, announced that he would run for the Democratic nomination. State Delegate Brian Moran, brother of Congressman Jim Moran, joined Deeds on January 4, 2008, when he established a political action committee. For the following year (before McAuliffe indicated his intentions to run), Deeds and Moran picked up endorsements and raised money. On January 3, 2009, McLean resident Terry McAuliffe, former chairman of the Democratic National Committee and chairman of Hillary Clinton's 2008 presidential campaign announced that he was also running. The Democratic primary, which took place on June 9, 2009, was the first contested in over twenty years.

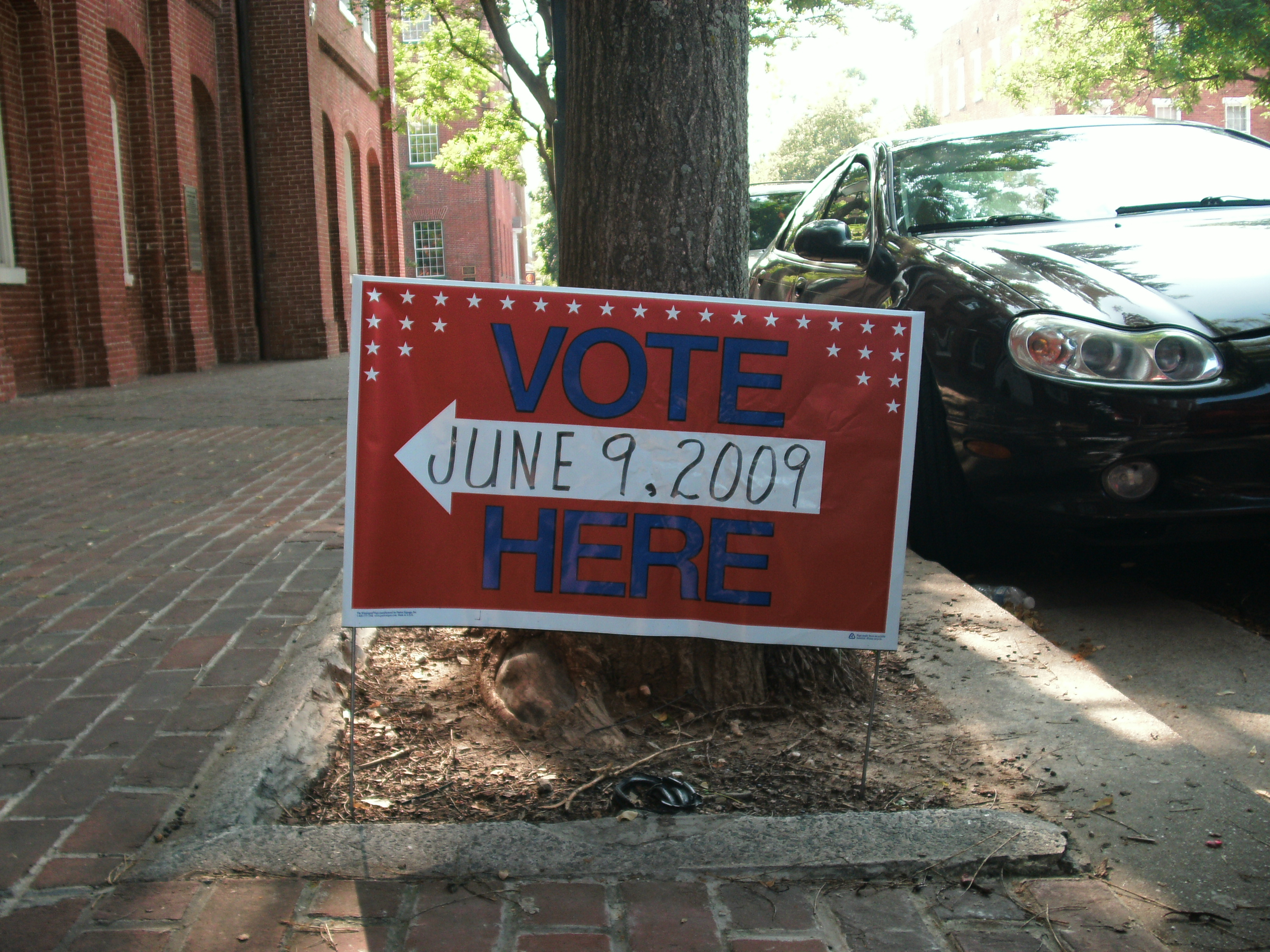
Sign outside Alexandria City Hall, indicating the nearest polling place

Moran received many endorsements from members of the State Democratic Party as well as the mayors of the Hampton Roads area. Deeds picked up support from Northern and Western Virginia, such as the endorsement from U.S. Congressman Rick Boucher. The area of strength for Deeds was concentrated in Western and Southern Virginia, and the area of strength for Moran consisted mostly of Eastern Virginia, with both reaching out to Northern Virginian voters.

The race was close from the beginning, with McAuliffe considered to be a semi-frontrunner due to his lead in the polls and big campaign war chest. However, in the last few weeks of the race, Deeds began to surge in the polls. By election night, June 9, he swept to victory. Deeds spent $14.49 for each vote on the Democratic primary election. McAuliffe spent $68.25 for each vote on the Democratic primary election.

=== Endorsements ===
Terry McAuliffe

Individuals

- Anthony Burfoot, vice mayor of Norfolk
- Bill Clinton, former president
- Algie Howell, delegate (90th district)
- Randal J. Kirk, businessman
- Kenneth R. Plum, state delegate (36th district)
- Ed Rendell, governor of Pennsylvania
- Brian Schweitzer, governor of Montana

Organizations

- Virginia League of Conservation Voters
- Virginia Professional Fire Fighters (VPFF)
Creigh Deeds

Individuals

- Richard Baugh, vice mayor of Harrisonburg
- Rick Boucher, U.S. representative (VA-9)
- David Brown, member of Charlottesville City Council
- Henry L. Marsh, state senator (16th district)
- Chap Petersen, state senator (34th district)
- Alonzo C. Pruitt, chief chaplain of the Richmond City Jail
- Phil Puckett, state senator (38th district)
- Richard Saslaw, state senate majority leader (35th district)
- Mary Margaret Whipple, state senator (31st district)

Organizations

- Fairfax Coalition of Police
- Fairfax Deputy Sheriffs Coalition

Newspapers

- The Washington Post
Brian Moran

Individuals

- Ward Armstrong, state house minority leader (10th district)
- Paul D. Fraim, mayor of Norfolk
- Joe Frank, mayor of Newport News
- James W. Holley, III, mayor of Portsmouth
- Dwight Clinton Jones, mayor of Richmond
- Jim Moran, U.S. representative (VA-8)
- Meyera Oberndorf, former mayor of Virginia Beach
- Molly Joseph Ward, mayor of Hampton
- 17 members of the Democratic Party of Virginia steering committee

=== Fundraising ===
Fundraising totals through June 30, 2009, from the Virginia Public Access Project.

Candidate	Raised	Spent	Cash on hand
Creigh Deeds	$6,207,528	$3,486,179	$2,721,350
Terry McAuliffe	$8,250,507	$8,250,205	$304
Bob McDonnell	$73,981	$3,360	$920,623
Brian Moran	$4,057,882	$4,034,070	$23,816

=== Polling ===
Source	Dates administered	Terry McAuliffe	Brian Moran	Creigh Deeds
Survey USA	June 8	30%	21%	42%
Public Policy Polling	June 6–7	26%	24%	40%
Suffolk University	June 4	20%	20%	27%
Daily Kos/Research 2000	June 1–3	26%	27%	30%
Survey USA	May 31 – June 2	35%	26%	29%
Public Policy Polling	May 28–31	24%	22%	27%
Public Policy Polling	May 19–21, 2009	29%	20%	20%
Daily Kos/Research 2000	May 18–20, 2009	36%	22%	13%
Survey USA	May 17–19, 2009	37%	22%	26%
Public Policy Polling	May 1–3, 2009	30%	20%	14%
Survey USA	April 25–27, 2009	38%	22%	22%
Research 2000	April 6–8, 2009	19%	24%	16%
Public Policy Polling	March 27–29, 2009	18%	22%	15%
Public Policy Polling	February 28 – March 1, 2009	21%	19%	14%
Public Policy Polling	January 30 – February 1, 2009	18%	18%	11%

=== Results ===
Democratic primary results by county and independent city: Deeds: Deeds—30–40%; Deeds—40–50%; Deeds—50–60%; Deeds—60–70%; Deeds—70–80%; Deeds—80–90%; Deeds—90–100%; McAuliffe: McAuliffe—30–40%; McAuliffe—40–50%; McAuliffe—50–60%; Moran: Moran—30–40%; Moran—40–50%; Moran—50–60%

Democratic primary results
Party	Candidate	Votes	%
Democratic	Creigh Deeds	158,845	49.77
Democratic	Terry McAuliffe	84,387	26.44
Democratic	Brian Moran	75,936	23.79
Total votes		319,168	100.00

== Republican convention ==
Attorney General Bob McDonnell first announced his intention to run at American Legion's Boys State of Virginia 2007. This was the sixth consecutive Virginian gubernatorial election in which an attorney general ran.

McDonnell was the only Republican candidate to file with the election board before the November 2008 deadline. As a result, there was no Republican Party primary. McDonnell accepted the Republican nomination at a state convention on May 30, 2009, in Richmond. Other potential candidates for the Republican nomination, lieutenant governor Bill Bolling and former senator George Allen, both declined to run.

Chairman of the Republican National Committee Michael Steele had said that the election for governor of Virginia is one of the most important elections for the Republican Party.

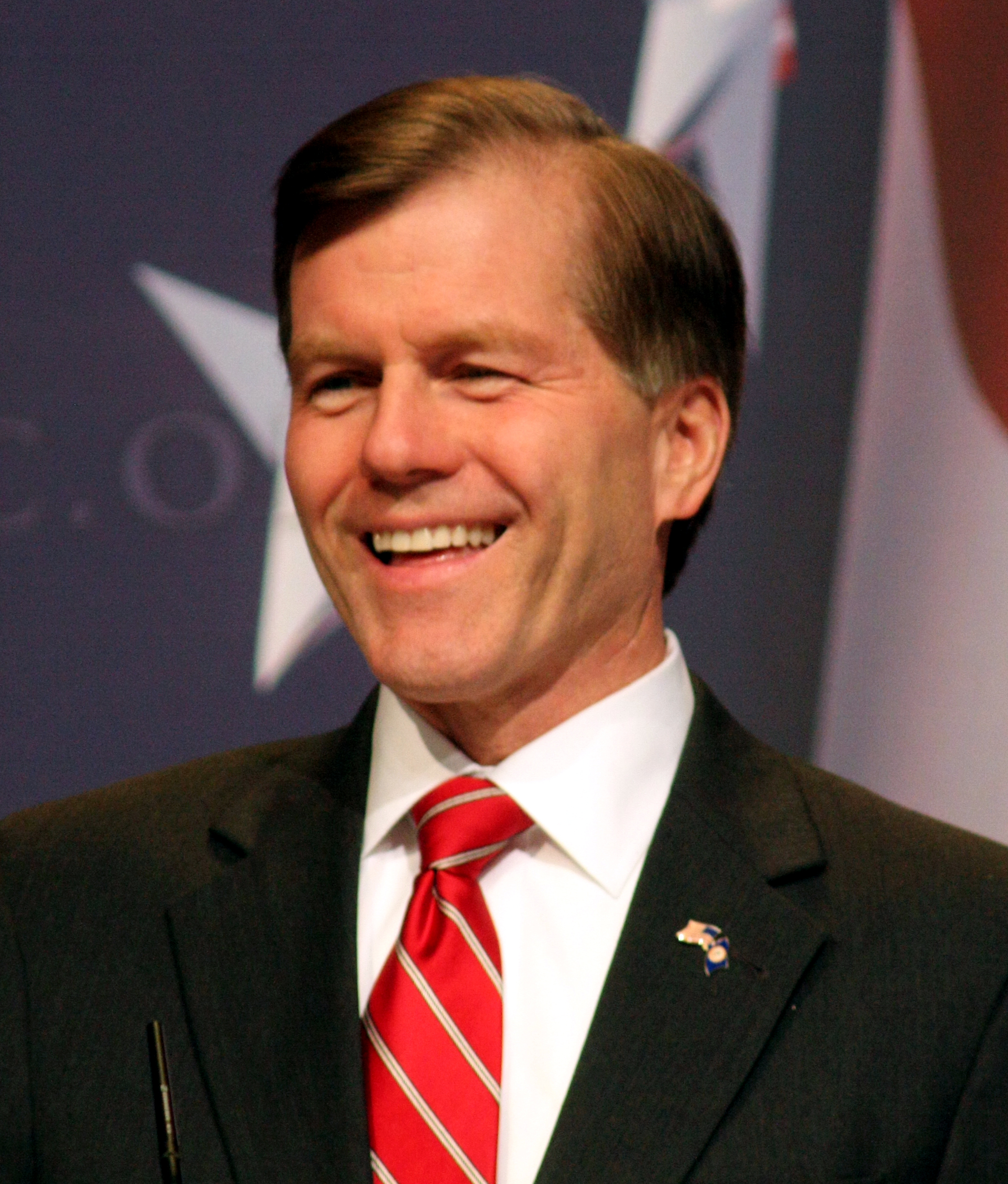
Former attorney general Bob McDonnell (campaign article)

== General election ==
Deeds and McDonnell both ran for attorney general of Virginia in 2005. McDonnell won by just over 300 votes, in the same election in which Tim Kaine was elected governor with 52% of the vote.

The main themes of the election were the economy, transportation, and jobs.

The first debate was in Hot Springs, Virginia on July 25.

Vice President Joe Biden campaigned for Deeds in Henrico County, Virginia, a suburb of Richmond, Virginia on July 16. Also attending were Richmond Mayor Dwight Clinton Jones, state senator A. Donald McEachin (D-Henrico), and Virginia first lady Anne Holton.

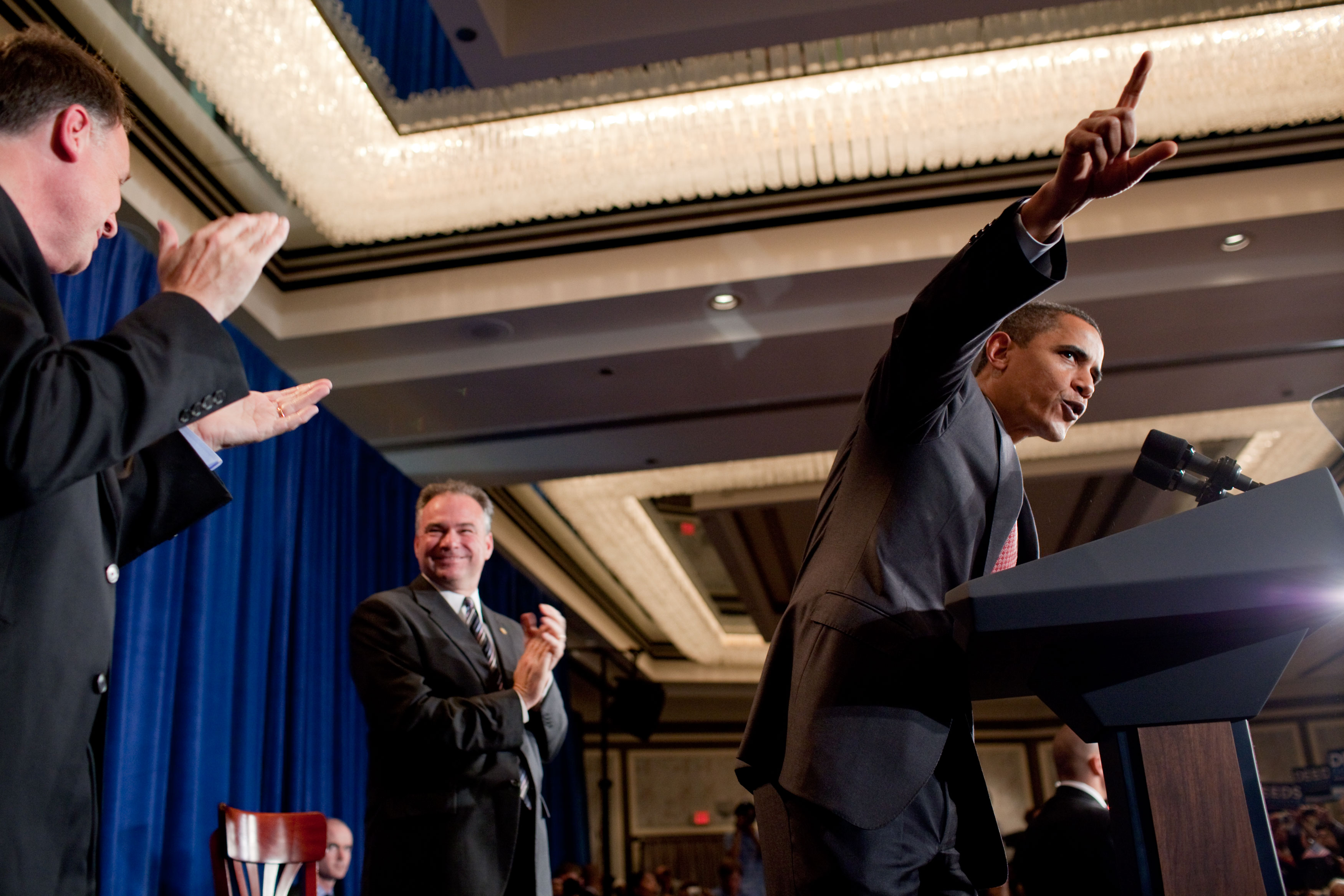
President Obama and Governor Kaine campaigning with Deeds on August 6

On August 6, President Barack Obama and Governor Tim Kaine campaigned for Deeds in McLean, Virginia.

Deeds is from Bath County, Virginia, a rural area of fewer than 5,000 people, where John McCain received over 55% of the vote. McDonnell is from Virginia Beach, which McCain won with 49.9%.

=== Fundraising ===
Candidate	General elec. raised	Total raised
R Creigh Deeds (Democrat)	$10,057,402	$16,264,930
Robert F McDonnell (Republican)	$21,466,436	$21,466,436

=== Predictions ===
Source	Ranking	As of
Rothenberg Political Report	Lean R (flip)	October 26, 2009

=== Polling ===
Source	Dates administered	Creigh Deeds (D)	Bob McDonnell (R)
SurveyUSA	October 30 – November 1, 2009	40%	58%
Public Policy Polling	November 1, 2009	42%	56%
Mason-Dixon/Richmond Times-Dispatch	October 28–29, 2009	41%	53%
Research 2000	October 26–28, 2009	44%	54%
Center for Community Research	October 21–27, 2009	36%	53%
Rasmussen Reports	October 27, 2009	41%	54%
SurveyUSA	October 25–26, 2009	41%	58%
Public Policy Polling	October 23–26, 2009	40%	55%
The Washington Post	October 22–25, 2009	44%	55%
Virginia Commonwealth University	October 21–25, 2009	36%	54%
SurveyUSA	October 17–19, 2009	40%	59%
Public Policy Polling	October 16–19, 2009	40%	52%
Clarus Research	October 18–19, 2009	41%	49%
CNU-Pilot-WVEC	October 19, 2009	31%	45%
Rasmussen Reports	October 12, 2009	43%	50%
Mason-Dixon	October 6–8, 2009	40%	48%
The Washington Post	October 4–7, 2009	44%	53%
Survey USA	October 2–4, 2009	43%	54%
Rasmussen Reports	September 29, 2009	42%	51%
Survey USA	September 26–28, 2009	41%	55%
Public Policy Polling	September 25–28, 2009	43%	48%
Insider Advantage	September 23, 2009	44%	48%
The Washington Post	September 20, 2009	47%	51%
Research 2000	September 14–16, 2009	43%	50%
Rasmussen Reports	September 16, 2009	46%	48%
Clarus Research Group	September 16, 2009	37%	42%
Survey USA	September 3, 2009	42%	54%
Rasmussen Reports	September 1, 2009	42%	51%
Public Policy Polling	August 28–31, 2009	42%	49%
The Washington Post	August 16, 2009	40%	47%
Rasmussen Reports	August 10, 2009	38%	47%
Research 2000	August 3–5, 2009	43%	51%
Public Policy Polling	July 31 – August 3, 2009	37%	51%
Survey USA	July 27–28, 2009	40%	55%
Rasmussen Reports	July 14, 2009	41%	44%
Public Policy Polling	June 30 – July 2, 2009	43%	49%
Research 2000	June 15–17, 2009	44%	45%
ALR	June 10–14, 2009	42%	38%
Rasmussen Reports	June 10, 2009	47%	41%
Survey USA	June 5 – 7, 2009	43%	47%
Survey USA	May 31 – June 2, 2009	43%	44%
Research 2000	May 18–20, 2009	32%	45%
Survey USA	May 17–19, 2009	40%	46%
Survey USA	April 27, 2009	39%	44%
Rasmussen Reports	April 15, 2009	30%	45%
Research 2000	April 6–8, 2009	31%	38%
Rasmussen Reports	February 4, 2009	30%	39%
Rasmussen Reports	December 4, 2008	39%	39%
Public Policy Polling	June 14–16, 2008	27%	32%

Hypothetical polling

with McAuliffe

Source	Dates administered	Terry McAuliffe (D)	Bob McDonnell (R)
Survey USA	May 31 – June 2, 2009	40%	47%
Research 2000	May 18–20, 2009	34%	44%
Survey USA	May 19, 2009	40%	46%
Survey USA	April 27, 2009	39%	46%
Rasmussen Reports	April 15, 2009	33%	45%
Research 2000	April 8, 2009	33%	40%
Rasmussen Reports	February 4, 2009	35%	42%
Rasmussen Reports	December 4, 2008	36%	41%

with Moran

Source	Dates administered	Brian Moran (D)	Bob McDonnell (R)
Survey USA	May 31 – June 2, 2009	37%	48%
Research 2000	May 18–20, 2009	35%	42%
Survey USA	May 19, 2009	37%	47%
Survey USA	April 27, 2009	34%	46%
Rasmussen Reports	April 15, 2009	34%	44%
Research 2000	April 8, 2009	36%	37%
Rasmussen Reports	February 4, 2009	36%	39%
Rasmussen Reports	December 4, 2008	41%	37%
Public Policy Polling	June 14–16, 2008	27%	33%

=== Results ===
Virginia gubernatorial election, 2009
Party	Candidate	Votes	%	±%
Republican	Bob McDonnell	1,163,651	58.61%	+12.62%
Democratic	Creigh Deeds	818,950	41.25%	−10.47%
Write-in		2,502	0.12%	
Majority		344,701	17.36%	+11.63%
Turnout		1,985,103	42%	
Republican gain from Democratic		Swing		

==== By county and independent city ====
County	McDonnell	Votes	Deeds	Votes	Others	Votes
Accomack	62.4%	5,400	37.6%	3,249	0.0%	2
Albemarle	50.5%	15,767	49.4%	15,433	0.1%	35
Alexandria	37.0%	13,050	62.8%	22,108	0.2%	71
Alleghany	38.7%	2,017	61.2%	3,190	0.1%	3
Amelia	71.1%	2,878	28.9%	1,168	0.0%	2
Amherst	67.9%	5,976	32.1%	2,827	0.0%	4
Appomattox	74.3%	3,397	25.6%	1,172	0.0%	1
Arlington	34.3%	19,325	65.5%	36,949	0.2%	141
Augusta	77.4%	15,661	22.5%	4,558	0.1%	16
Bath	36.5%	666	63.5%	1,159	0.1%	1
Bedford County	77.1%	16,881	22.9%	5,009	0.1%	14
Bedford	64.8%	1,016	35.2%	553	0.0%	0
Bland	75.9%	1,394	24.1%	442	0.1%	1
Botetourt	71.3%	7,726	28.6%	3,097	0.2%	19
Bristol	72.4%	2,760	27.5%	1,047	0.1%	3
Brunswick	50.5%	2,107	49.4%	2,062	0.1%	4
Buchanan	63.2%	3,261	36.7%	1,895	0.0%	2
Buckingham	63.4%	2,313	36.6%	1,335	0.0%	0
Buena Vista	60.9%	824	39.1%	528	0.0%	0
Campbell	76.9%	11,611	22.9%	3,457	0.2%	26
Caroline	56.5%	3,709	43.5%	2,855	0.1%	4
Carroll	73.0%	5,229	27.0%	1,932	0.1%	5
Charles City	41.4%	890	58.5%	1,259	0.1%	2
Charlotte	66.6%	2,347	33.2%	1,171	0.1%	5
Charlottesville	26.2%	2,636	73.6%	7,406	0.1%	14
Chesapeake	60.3%	32,518	39.6%	21,376	0.1%	43
Chesterfield	66.3%	59,558	33.6%	30,161	0.2%	156
Clarke	63.3%	2,744	36.6%	1,586	0.1%	4
Colonial Heights	83.1%	4,333	16.8%	877	0.0%	2
Covington	34.1%	507	65.8%	979	0.1%	2
Craig	67.8%	1,091	32.2%	518	0.1%	1
Culpeper	70.3%	7,253	29.6%	3,057	0.1%	14
Cumberland	64.1%	1,728	35.9%	967	0.0%	1
Danville	55.0%	6,001	44.9%	4,906	0.1%	11
Dickenson	60.5%	2,176	39.5%	1,420	0.1%	3
Dinwiddie	62.6%	4,461	37.3%	2,661	0.1%	4
Emporia	52.4%	690	47.6%	627	0.1%	1
Essex	60.8%	1,631	39.2%	1,051	0.0%	0
Fairfax County	50.7%	138,655	49.1%	134,189	0.2%	438
Fairfax	53.0%	3,285	46.9%	2,909	0.1%	7
Falls Church	34.9%	1,463	64.9%	2,718	0.1%	6
Fauquier	68.8%	12,309	31.1%	5,566	0.1%	23
Floyd	65.8%	2,951	34.1%	1,529	0.2%	7
Fluvanna	63.4%	4,850	36.5%	2,791	0.1%	10
Franklin County	68.8%	10,283	31.1%	4,656	0.1%	12
Franklin	45.4%	1,013	54.5%	1,216	0.0%	1
Frederick	74.8%	13,274	25.1%	4,456	0.1%	25
Fredericksburg	48.9%	2,231	50.8%	2,318	0.2%	10
Galax	62.4%	818	37.4%	490	0.2%	3
Giles	63.3%	2,916	36.6%	1,683	0.1%	4
Gloucester	72.1%	8,126	27.8%	3,130	0.1%	16
Goochland	70.8%	5,837	29.1%	2,401	0.1%	10
Grayson	70.3%	3,026	29.7%	1,279	0.0%	0
Greene	72.5%	3,514	27.4%	1,326	0.1%	5
Greensville	47.4%	1,283	52.6%	1,426	0.0%	0
Halifax	61.5%	5,453	38.3%	3,390	0.2%	19
Hampton	42.0%	13,559	57.9%	18,696	0.1%	47
Hanover	76.2%	26,401	23.6%	8,180	0.1%	46
Harrisonburg	57.7%	3,816	42.2%	2,790	0.2%	11
Henrico	56.2%	49,462	43.7%	38,420	0.1%	114
Henry	63.0%	8,160	37.0%	4,791	0.0%	1
Highland	55.1%	619	44.9%	505	0.0%	0
Hopewell	62.4%	2,926	37.4%	1,753	0.2%	11
Isle of Wight	65.8%	7,684	34.1%	3,981	0.1%	8
James City	65.6%	15,193	34.3%	7,945	0.1%	25
King and Queen	58.9%	1,175	41.0%	819	0.1%	2
King George	70.2%	3,839	29.7%	1,624	0.1%	7
King William	71.5%	3,411	28.4%	1,354	0.1%	3
Lancaster	64.6%	3,051	35.2%	1,661	0.3%	12
Lee	74.3%	3,755	25.7%	1,300	0.0%	1
Lexington	39.3%	592	60.5%	911	0.1%	2
Loudoun	61.0%	39,996	38.8%	25,430	0.1%	95
Louisa	65.3%	5,713	34.6%	3,023	0.1%	7
Lunenburg	62.5%	2,040	37.5%	1,222	0.0%	1
Lynchburg	61.8%	12,503	38.1%	7,713	0.1%	26
Madison	69.5%	2,892	30.5%	1,268	0.1%	3
Manassas	61.9%	4,266	38.0%	2,618	0.1%	5
Manassas Park	60.2%	1,006	39.8%	666	0.0%	0
Martinsville	48.2%	1,565	51.7%	1,678	0.2%	5
Mathews	69.9%	2,490	30.0%	1,067	0.1%	4
Mecklenburg	67.7%	4,872	32.3%	2,327	0.0%	1
Middlesex	69.5%	2,652	30.4%	1,161	0.1%	2
Montgomery	54.5%	11,378	45.3%	9,455	0.2%	35
Nelson	53.7%	2,683	46.2%	2,311	0.1%	5
New Kent	74.4%	4,526	25.5%	1,549	0.1%	6
Newport News	49.9%	18,401	50.0%	18,415	0.1%	41
Norfolk	39.8%	15,913	60.1%	24,025	0.1%	50
Northampton	51.0%	1,976	48.9%	1,892	0.1%	4
Northumberland	65.4%	3,167	34.4%	1,665	0.2%	10
Norton	60.6%	568	39.3%	369	0.1%	1
Nottoway	58.3%	2,415	41.6%	1,723	0.1%	6
Orange	67.3%	6,248	32.7%	3,033	0.1%	6
Page	70.1%	5,245	29.7%	2,223	0.1%	9
Patrick	70.0%	3,383	29.9%	1,442	0.1%	5
Petersburg	19.0%	1,221	81.0%	5,214	0.0%	3
Pittsylvania	71.5%	11,739	28.5%	4,689	0.0%	0
Poquoson	80.2%	3,737	19.8%	922	0.1%	3
Portsmouth	40.2%	8,824	59.8%	13,124	0.1%	15
Powhatan	79.8%	7,287	20.0%	1,828	0.1%	11
Prince Edward	55.0%	2,752	44.9%	2,250	0.1%	4
Prince George	68.9%	5,846	31.0%	2,634	0.1%	7
Prince William	58.7%	43,993	41.2%	30,847	0.1%	100
Pulaski	65.1%	5,689	34.8%	3,044	0.0%	3
Radford	54.6%	1,554	45.3%	1,291	0.1%	3
Rappahannock	57.7%	1,664	42.2%	1,217	0.1%	3
Richmond County	68.3%	1,525	31.7%	708	0.0%	1
Richmond	30.5%	13,785	69.2%	31,241	0.2%	101
Roanoke County	68.0%	20,617	31.8%	9,643	0.1%	45
Roanoke	48.0%	9,929	51.9%	10,731	0.1%	21
Rockbridge	58.1%	3,964	41.9%	2,859	0.0%	3
Rockingham	78.1%	16,519	21.8%	4,599	0.1%	22
Russell	62.4%	4,812	37.6%	2,895	0.0%	2
Salem	66.5%	4,706	33.4%	2,365	0.2%	11
Scott	78.8%	4,370	21.1%	1,172	0.1%	3
Shenandoah	74.9%	9,129	25.0%	3,049	0.1%	18
Smyth	73.5%	5,424	26.4%	1,946	0.1%	7
Southampton	59.8%	2,992	40.2%	2,011	0.0%	2
Spotsylvania	68.4%	17,831	31.5%	8,220	0.1%	36
Stafford	67.4%	19,164	32.4%	9,226	0.2%	46
Staunton	58.5%	3,715	41.4%	2,627	0.1%	4
Suffolk	55.7%	11,095	44.2%	8,798	0.1%	14
Surry	46.2%	1,105	53.6%	1,283	0.2%	5
Sussex	52.4%	1,528	47.6%	1,386	0.0%	0
Tazewell	73.4%	7,588	26.6%	2,749	0.1%	7
Virginia Beach	63.7%	63,964	36.2%	36,303	0.1%	96
Warren	68.6%	5,604	31.3%	2,559	0.1%	8
Washington	74.9%	10,348	25.1%	3,469	0.0%	5
Waynesboro	68.9%	3,447	31.0%	1,549	0.1%	6
Westmoreland	58.6%	2,422	41.4%	1,711	0.0%	2
Williamsburg	45.3%	1,579	54.6%	1,905	0.1%	5
Winchester	60.7%	3,215	39.2%	2,076	0.2%	8
Wise	70.3%	5,538	29.6%	2,327	0.1%	9
Wythe	72.6%	5,650	27.2%	2,119	0.1%	10
York	69.6%	13,420	30.3%	5,839	0.1%	23

Counties and independent cities that flipped from Republican to Democratic

- Bath (largest city: Hot Springs)

Counties and independent cities that flipped from Democratic to Republican

- Accomack (largest city: Chincoteague)
- Albemarle (largest municipality: Scottsville)
- Bedford (independent city)
- Brunswick (largest borough: Lawrenceville)
- Buchanan (largest city: Grundy)
- Buena Vista (independent city)
- Caroline (largest municipality:Bowling Green)
- Chesapeake (independent city)
- Danville (independent city)
- Dinwiddie (largest municipality: McKenney)
- Fairfax (largest municipality: Herndon)
- Fairfax (independent city)
- Fluvanna (largest CDP: Lake Monticello)
- Galax (independent city)
- Giles (largest city: Pearisburg)
- Harrisonburg (independent city)
- Henrico (largest borough: Richmond)
- Henry (largest city: Ridgeway)
- James City (no municipalities)
- King and Queen (largest CDP: King and Queen Courthouse)
- Loudoun (largest borough: Leesburg)
- Lynchburg (independent city)
- Montgomery (largest municipality: Blacksburg)
- Nelson (largest municipality: Nellysford)
- Northampton (largest borough: Exmore)
- Nottoway (largest city: Blackstone)
- Prince Edward (largest municipality: Farmville)
- Prince William (largest borough: Manassas)
- Radford (independent city)
- Southampton (largest municipality: Courtland)
- Staunton (independent city)
- Suffolk (independent city)
- Sussex (largest borough: Waverly)
- Virginia Beach (independent city)
- Westmoreland (largest city: Colonial Beach)
- Winchester (independent city)

== Exit poll ==
2009 Virginia gubernatorial election voter demographics (CNN)
Demographic subgroup	McDonnell	Deeds	% of total vote
Ideology
Liberals	9	91	18
Moderates	47	53	42
Conservatives	91	9	40
Party
Democrats	7	93	33
Republicans	96	4	37
Independents	66	33	30
Barack Obama job approval
Approve	20	80	48
Disapprove	94	5	51
Most important issue to your vote
Economy	57	42	47
Healthcare	49	51	24
Taxes	84	16	15
Transportation	38	62	7
2008 presidential vote
John McCain	95	5	51
Barack Obama	12	88	43
Did not vote	N/A	N/A	2
Other	N/A	N/A	2
Gender
Men	62	37	48
Women	54	46	52
Race
White	67	32	78
Black	9	90	16
Latino	N/A	N/A	3
Asian	N/A	N/A	2
Other	N/A	N/A	1
Race by gender
White men	71	28	38
White women	63	36	40
Black men	8	91	6
Black women	10	90	9
Latino men	N/A	N/A	2
Latina women	N/A	N/A	2
Other	N/A	N/A	3
Age
18–29	55	45	10
30–44	56	44	24
45–64	59	41	47
65 or older	60	40	18
Area type
Urban	44	56	21
Suburban	43	57	48
Rural	69	31	31
Education
College graduate	54	45	54
No college degree	62	37	46
Education by race
White college graduates	61	39	44
Whites without college	75	24	35
Non-white college graduates	27	72	11
Non-whites without college	18	81	11
Educational attainment
No high school	N/A	N/A	3
High school graduate	64	35	17
Some college	62	37	26
College graduate	61	38	28
Advanced degree	46	53	26

== See also ==
- 2009 United States elections
- 2009 Virginia elections
