= 2005 Virginia Attorney General election =

- November 8, 2005
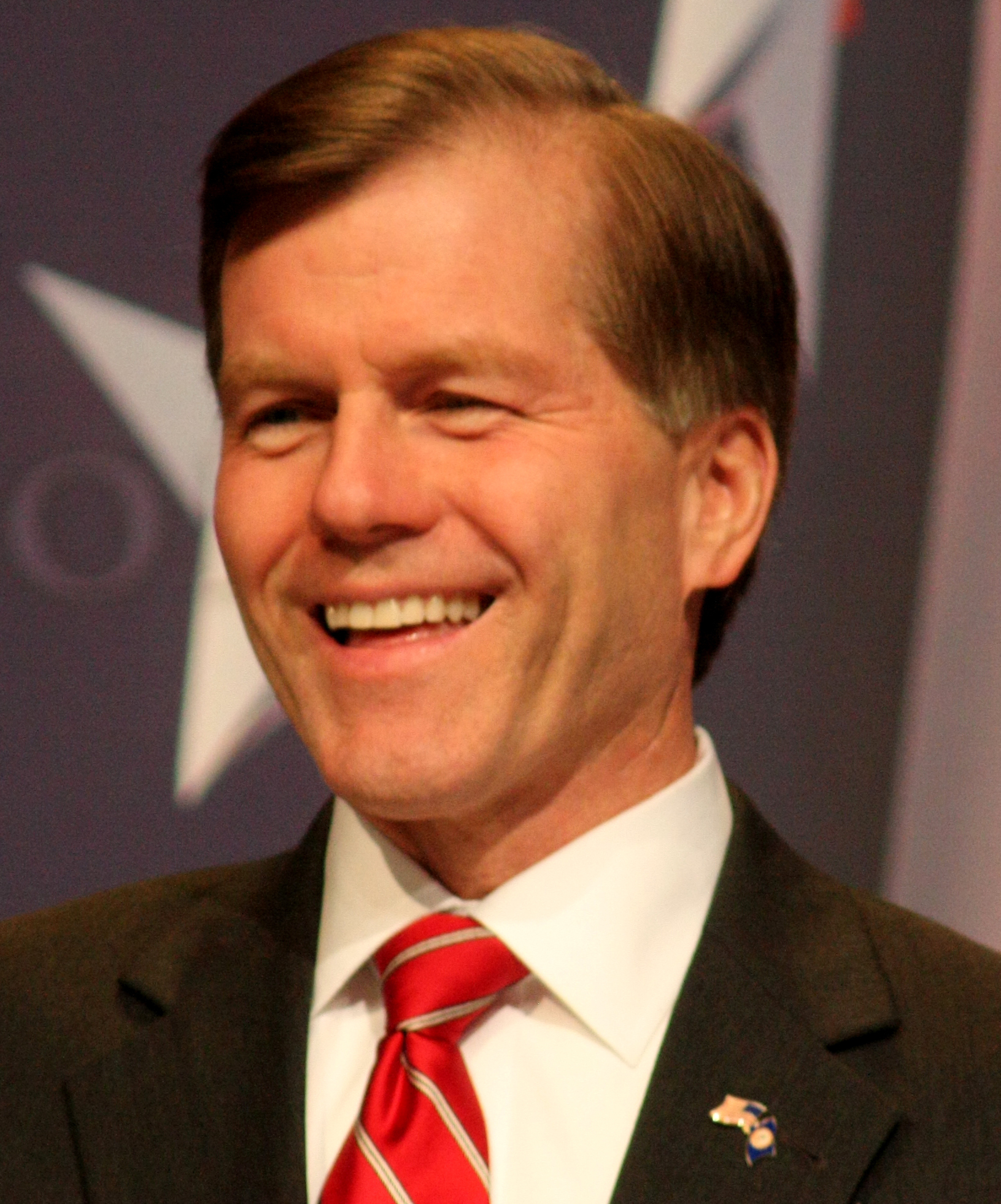

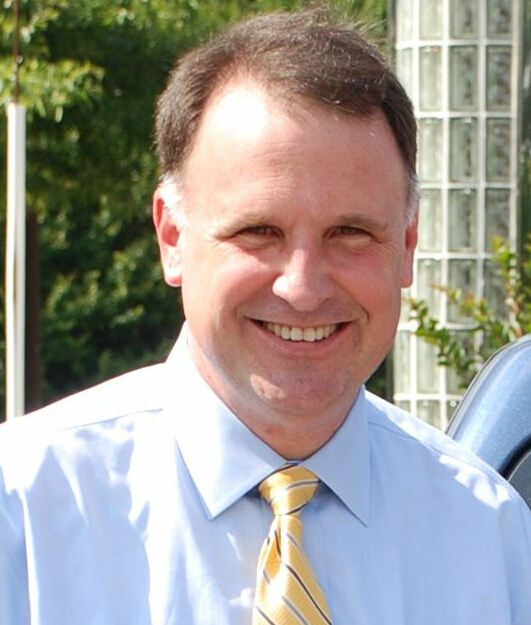
Nominee	Bob McDonnell	Creigh Deeds
Party	Republican	Democratic
Popular vote	970,981	970,621
Percentage	49.96%	49.94%
- McDonnell: 50–60% 60–70% 70–80% 80–90% Deeds: 50–60% 60–70% 70–80% 80–90% >90%
Attorney General before election
Judith Jagdmann
Republican
Elected Attorney General
Bob McDonnell
Republican

The Virginia Attorney General election of 2005 took place on November 8, 2005, to elect the Attorney General of Virginia. Jerry Kilgore, who had been elected attorney general in 2001, resigned in February 2005 to run for Governor, as is the tradition in Virginia. He was replaced by Judith Jagdmann, the Deputy Attorney General for the Civil Litigation Division, who did not run in the election.

The Republican primary was won by State Delegate Bob McDonnell, who defeated attorney Steve Baril. State Senator Creigh Deeds was unopposed in the Democratic primary. McDonnell won the race by 360 votes, which was so close it required a recount. He was sworn in as Attorney General alongside Governor Tim Kaine and Lieutenant Governor Bill Bolling on January 14, 2006.

McDonnell and Deeds went on to rematch in the 2009 Virginia gubernatorial election, which McDonnell won by a wide margin.

== Republican primary ==
The primary campaign was a contentious one. Baril accused McDonnell of bypassing campaign finance laws by taking hundreds of thousands of dollars in donations from clients he represented in cases in front of state agencies in his dual role as a "lawyer-legislator". McDonnell replied that the allegations were "baseless". Baril promised to be "the people's lawyer" and was endorsed by Eric Cantor. McDonnell, carrying Jim Gilmore's endorsement, cast himself as an experienced reformer.

=== Candidates ===
==== Declared ====
- Steve Baril, attorney
- Bob McDonnell, State Delegate

=== Results ===
Virginia Attorney General Republican primary, 2005
Party	Candidate	Votes	%	±%
Republican	Bob McDonnell	110,125	65.63%	
Republican	Steve Baril	57,679	34.37%	
Majority		52,446	47.62%	
Turnout		167,804		

== Democratic primary ==
Roanoke State Senator John S. Edwards was to challenge Deeds in a primary fight for the Attorney General Nomination for the Democratic Party of Virginia. Edwards, who had won 30% of the vote in the primary in 2001, was considered a viable candidate, but dropped out due to his tough liberal stances on gay rights. After Edwards' withdrawal, Deeds was the only candidate left in the Democratic primary. Running unopposed, Deeds won 100% of the primary vote on June 14, 2005.

=== Candidates ===
==== Declared ====
- Creigh Deeds, state senator

==== Withdrew ====
- John S. Edwards, state senator

== General election ==
=== Campaign ===
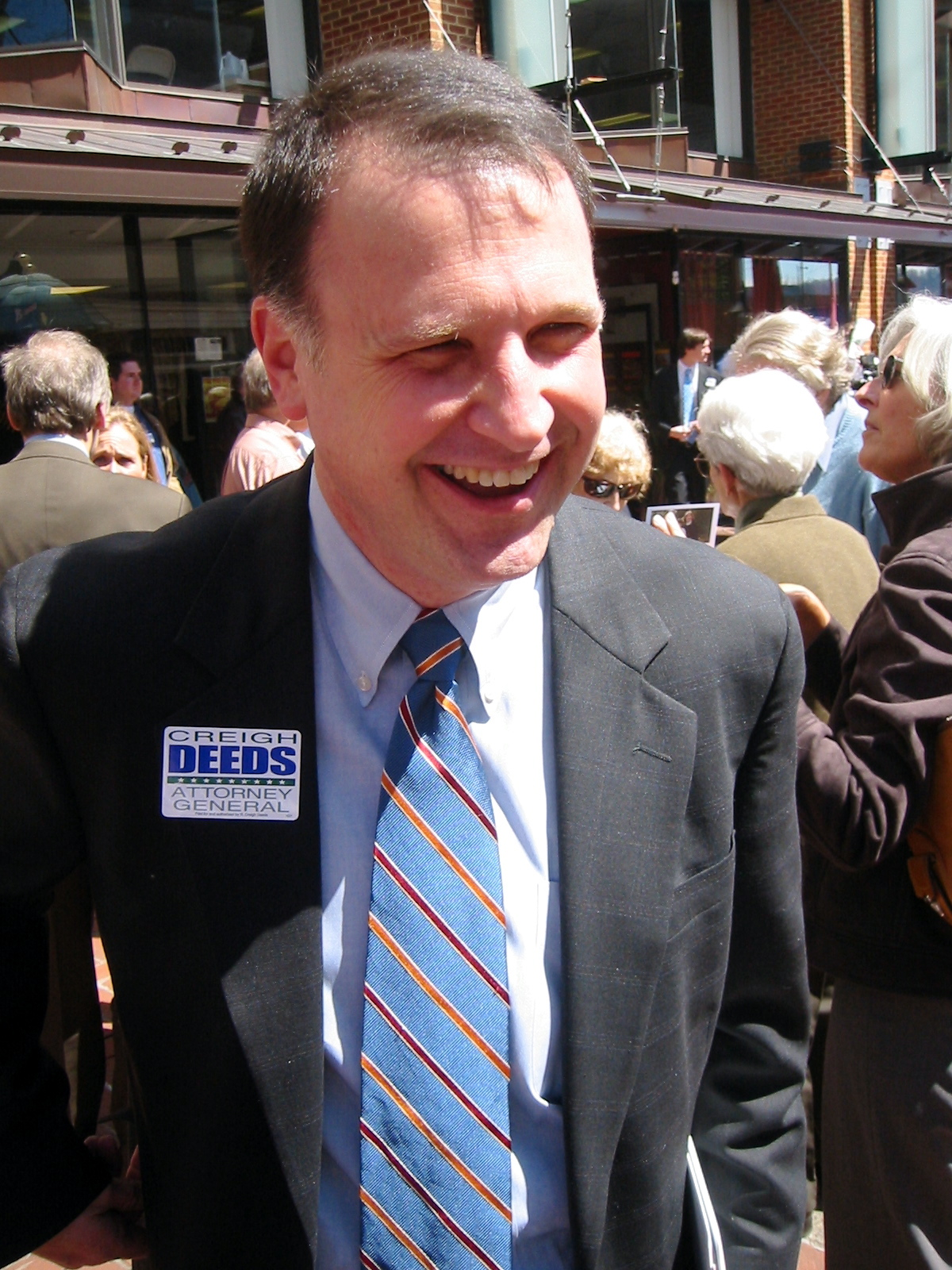
Deeds at a rally in Charlottesville

After securing the nomination due to Edwards' withdrawal, Deeds began positioning himself as a centrist Democrat such as Mark Warner. On June 14, Deeds found out his opponent in the general election would be Bob McDonnell after McDonnell had won the Republican primary. McDonnell, who also positioned himself as a moderate campaigned against Deeds. Throughout early polling, Deeds and McDonnell started the race off tied.

The first poll of the race, conducted by Mason-Dixon showed Deeds at 34% and McDonnell barely ahead with 35% which was inside the margin of error. By the second poll which was also conducted by Mason Dixon, Deeds was behind 33%-36%. Deeds continued to campaign and was endorsed by NARAL in August 2005.

Deeds based his campaign headquarters in Charlottesville, Virginia, which was in his native Senate district. Deeds continued to lag McDonnell in the polls until the endorsement of the NRA. In late September 2005, the NRA unexpectedly endorsed Deeds, the Democrat, over McDonnell. With the new ability to claim himself as a "centrist" Democrat, Deeds had gained much needed campaign momentum.

By late October, Deeds was only 4%-5% behind McDonnell. Heading into early November, Deeds was inside the margin of error with McDonnell, behind 40%-43%. On Election day, it appeared obvious that the race was heading into a recount. Deeds trailed McDonnell by approximately 320 votes.

=== Polling ===
Source	Date	Deeds (D)	McDonnell (R)
Mason Dixon	November 1–2, 2005	40%	43%
Roanoke College	October 23–30, 2005	34%	39%
Rasmussen Reports	October 26, 2005	39%	43%
Mason Dixon	October 18–20, 2005	34%	42%
Mason Dixon	September 13–15, 2005	33%	36%
Mason Dixon	July 19–21, 2005	34%	35%

For the majority of the campaign, Deeds lagged McDonnell from anywhere between 3%-8%. However, in the final weeks of the campaign, Deeds picked up support due in part because of the NRA's endorsement of him. In the final poll taken by Mason Dixon and released on November 3, Deeds was only 3% behind McDonnell.

=== Fundraising ===
Deeds lagged considerably in the fundraising race. On Election Day, according to Our Campaigns, the candidates had the following amount of Cash on hand:

- McDonnell - $3,500,000
- Deeds - $1,700,000

=== Initial results ===
Virginia Attorney General General election, 2005
Party	Candidate	Votes	%	±%
Republican	Bob McDonnell	970,886	49.96%	
Democratic	Creigh Deeds	970,563	49.95%	

=== Recount ===
In late November, the Board of Elections certified Bob McDonnell as the winner by 323 votes. However, Deeds announced he would petition the courts for a recount on November 29. The recount was set to last until mid-December.

The recount started later than expected on December 20, 2005, when both campaigns were allowed to comb through ballots to make any challenges. Despite the fact that it was a recount, very few ballots were actually recounted as opposed to both campaigns making challenges to hand-fulls of ballot instead.

On December 22, 2005, however, the Board of Elections confirmed McDonnell the winner of the recount by a 360-vote margin. Despite the fact that the race was one of the closest in history, the recount had actually gained McDonnell exactly 37 votes boosting his margin from 323 votes to exactly a 360-vote lead over Deeds. Deeds called McDonnell at 7:15 that night to congratulate him on the victory.

Certified results

After the recount, the final certified tally was as follows:

Virginia Attorney General election, 2005
Party	Candidate	Votes	%	±%
Republican	Bob McDonnell	970,981	49.96%	
Democratic	Creigh Deeds	970,621	49.94%	
Write-ins		1,801	0.09%	
Majority		360	0.02%	
Turnout		1,943,403		
Republican hold				
