= Bob McDonnell 2009 gubernatorial campaign =

American political campaign

McDonnell for Governor
- Campaign: 2009 Virginia gubernatorial election
- Candidate: Bob McDonnell; Attorney General of Virginia 2006–2009; Virginia General Assemblymen 1992–2005
- Affiliation: Republican Party
- Status: Elected to the position on November 3, 2009
- Receipts: US$10,673,981 (2008-01-31)

Website
- McDonnell for Governor

Former Attorney General of Virginia Bob McDonnell was the Republican nominee for the 2009 gubernatorial race in the U.S. Commonwealth of Virginia. At the Virginia State Convention on May 30, 2009, he officially received the party's nomination, as Republican Lieutenant Governor Bill Bolling decided against opposing him. His opponent in the general election was State Senator Creigh Deeds, a Democrat from Bath County. Although the race was close in September, McDonnell began take a commanding leads in the poll heading into election day, when he defeated his opponent by a margin of 18 points. He was inaugurated on January 16, 2010, at the Virginia State Capitol.

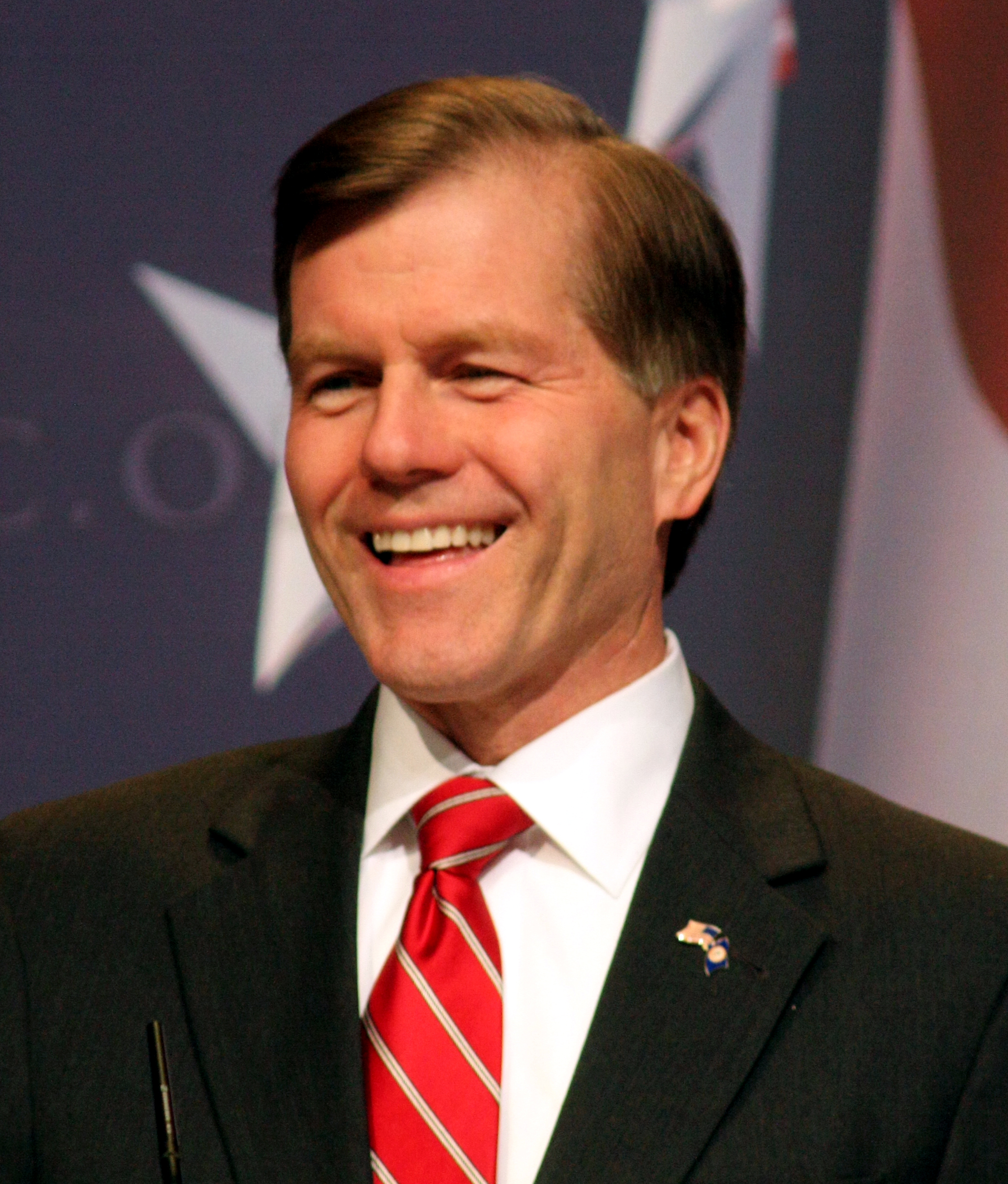
Bob McDonnell

== Campaign ==
McDonnell announced his candidacy for the 2009 Virginia gubernatorial election at American Legion's Boy's State of Virginia 2007, making him the seventh consecutive elected attorney general to run. McDonnell accepted the GOP's nomination at the Republican State convention, receiving "extended applause from a boisterous crowd of more than 10,000 Republicans from across the state." Less than two weeks later, State Senator R. Creigh Deeds won his party's nomination in a primary, setting up a "rematch" from the state attorney general's race four years earlier.

In early June, Deeds possessed a slight edge, with a 47%-41% advantage in the early polls. As the campaign continued to progress, the polls shifted toward McDonnell's favor, even giving him a commanding lead in some. When the Washington Post released McDonnell's thesis from Regent University, McDonnell's lead dwindled to only two percentage points in the Rasmussen. As the effects of the thesis began to disappear, McDonnell's campaign regained steam, ultimately taking a commanding lead heading into election day.

McDonnell crushed Deeds in the general election by a vote of 59%-41%, receiving the highest percentage of the vote for any candidate for governor since 1961. In addition, the Republican Party of Virginia swept all three elections: Ken Cuccinelli won the attorney general election and Bill Bolling was reelected to a second term as lieutenant governor.

=== Issues ===
The McDonnell campaign strategy focused on economic issues, transportation, and public safety. McDonnell's proposals included new job initiatives, boosting Virginia’s tourism, hospitality, and film industries, making Wallops Island the top commercial spaceport in America, and expanding growth in rural Virginia. His education proposals would move $480 million per year from school administration and put it directly into classrooms, establish more specialized high schools to support high-demand industries, increase online learning through virtual schools, and support educational mentoring programs. McDonnell has frequently expressed his support for President Barack Obama's ideas on increasing parental choice through charter schools.

McDonnell said that his priority as governor would be employment for Virginians. He favored right-to-work laws, low operating cost of government and a simplified tax code.

==== Transportation ====
McDonnell's campaign addressed transportation, a major issue in heavily congested areas of Virginia. His plan included issuing $3 billion in transportation bonds that had been approved by the Virginia General Assembly in 2007, modernizing the Virginia Department of Transportation, and encouraging public-private partnerships to improve infrastructure. He wanted to widen I-66, improve I-95, and finish Metro to Dulles.

==== Energy ====
McDonnell wanted to make Virginia the "energy capital" of the East Coast. He supported drilling for oil off of the coast of Virginia while simultaneously developing new technologies for wind, solar, biomass, and other renewable energy resources. Opponents of McDonnell's drilling proposal said that drilling for oil would risk Southern tourism, rare wildlife, and fisheries for what the U.S. Department of the Interior's Minerals Management Service estimated would be only enough oil for six months, and would require seven to ten years to bring online. He intended to expand investments in renewable energy sources and incentivize green job creation.

==== Abortion ====
McDonnell is anti-abortion. As a state legislator, he introduced legislation that would have banned late-term abortions, as well as other legislation requiring parental consent before a minor has an abortion, and informed consent for all women. He opposes government funding for elective abortions.

==== Thesis ====
McDonnell's 1989 thesis for Regent University was a 93-page document titled The Republican Party's Vision for the Family: The Compelling Issue of The Decade. It explored the rise in the numbers of divorces and illegitimate births, examined public policies that may have contributed to that increase, and proposed solutions.

The document gained attention in the campaign because it outlined a 15-point conservative agenda, including 10 points McDonnell pursued during his years in the General Assembly, according to press analysis. This agenda includes opposition to abortion and support for school vouchers, and tax policies that favor heterosexual families. In the work, McDonnell argues for covenant marriage, a "legally distinct type of marriage intended to make it more difficult to obtain a divorce".

In his thesis, McDonnell said "government policy should favor married couples over 'cohabitators, homosexuals or fornicators.'" He "described working women and feminists as 'detrimental' to the family." McDonnell also "criticized a landmark 1965 Supreme Court decision" which legalized the use of contraceptives by married couples. In the thesis, McDonnell argued for the use of government intervention on societal issues, writing that "man’s basic nature is inclined towards evil, and when the exercise of liberty takes the shape of pornography, drug abuse, or homosexuality, the government must restrain, punish, and deter."

McDonnell responded to the article, stating, "Virginians will judge me on my 18-year record as a legislator and attorney general and the specific plans I have laid out for our future -- not on a decades-old academic paper I wrote as a student during the Reagan era and haven't thought about in years." The Washington Post reported that McDonnell maintained, "Like everybody, my views on many issues have changed as I have gotten older." He said his evolved position on family policy was best represented by his 1995 welfare reform legislation where he "worked to include child day care in the bill so women would have greater freedom to work." He insisted that the position on working women he espoused in the thesis "was simply an academic exercise and clearly does not reflect my views."

Virginia Governor Tim Kaine, a supporter of McDonnell's Democratic opponent, state Sen. R. Creigh Deeds, responded that McDonnell had since made more than one intervention concerning sexual orientation. Kaine pointed to the fact that McDonnell advocated a state constitutional amendment requiring that marriage can occur only between a man and a woman, and intervened to oppose Kaine's first act as governor in 2006, to expand the state's nondiscrimination policy to include sexual orientation.

==== Campaign organization and financial support ====
McDonnell's campaign headquarters was located in Richmond. His campaign finance report for September 15, 2009, indicates that he had nearly 1,500 more new donors than the Deeds campaign had total donors, a total of 6,239 donors, 4,946 of them new.

The McDonnell for Governor campaign printed a variety of bumper stickers appealing to many interest groups, including "Women for McDonnell," "Sportsmen for McDonnell," and "Independents for McDonnell." Some appealed to the diverse minority groups throughout the Commonwealth. Some featured the mascots of select public universities such as The University of Virginia, Virginia Tech, James Madison University, Virginia Military Institute, and Old Dominion University. "Irish for McDonnell" stickers were printed for the select Virginia residents who attended the University of Notre Dame.

==== Endorsements ====
McDonnell was endorsed by Sheila Johnson, co-founder of Black Entertainment Television and owner of the Washington Mystics; Virginia AgPAC: the Political Action Committee of the Virginia Farm Bureau, representing over 147,000 members; the Virginia Association of Realtors, the largest trade association in Virginia, with over 33,000 members; the Virginia Credit Union League, a trade association representing the Commonwealth’s 194 not-for-profit credit unions and the 3 million member-owners residing in Virginia; the Virginia chapter of the National Federation of Independent Business (NFIB), a group whose membership consists of over 6,000 small businesses across the state; and the NRA Political Victory Fund, which reversed its 2005 decision wherein it had endorsed Deeds for attorney general.

=== Polling ===
Source	Dates administered	Creigh Deeds (D)	Bob McDonnell (R)
SurveyUSA	October 17–19, 2009	40%	59%
Public Policy Polling	October 16–19, 2009	40%	52%
Clarus Research	October 18–19, 2009	41%	49%
CNU-Pilot-WVEC	October 19, 2009	31%	45%
Rasmussen Reports	October 12, 2009	43%	50%
Mason-Dixon	October 6–8, 2009	40%	48%
Washington Post	October 4–7, 2009	44%	53%
Survey USA	October 2–4, 2009	43%	54%
Rasmussen Reports	September 29, 2009	42%	51%
Survey USA	September 26–28, 2009	41%	55%
Public Policy Polling	September 25–28, 2009	43%	48%
Insider Advantage	September 23, 2009	44%	48%
Washington Post	September 20, 2009	47%	51%
Research 2000	September 14–16, 2009	43%	50%
Rasmussen Reports	September 16, 2009	46%	48%
Clarus Research Group	September 16, 2009	37%	42%
Survey USA	September 3, 2009	42%	54%
Rasmussen Reports	September 1, 2009	42%	51%
Public Policy Polling	August 28–31, 2009	42%	49%
Washington Post	August 16, 2009	40%	47%
Rasmussen Reports	August 10, 2009	38%	47%
Research 2000	August 3–5, 2009	43%	51%
Public Policy Polling	July 31-August 3, 2009	37%	51%
Survey USA	July 27–28, 2009	40%	55%
Rasmussen Reports	July 14, 2009	41%	44%
Public Policy Polling	June 30-July 2, 2009	43%	49%
Research 2000	June 15–17, 2009	44%	45%
ALR	June 10–14, 2009	42%	38%
Rasmussen Reports	June 10, 2009	47%	41%
Survey USA	June 5-June 7, 2009	43%	47%
Survey USA	May 31-June 2, 2009	43%	44%
Research 2000	May 18–20, 2009	32%	45%
Survey USA	May 17–19, 2009	40%	46%
Survey USA	April 27, 2009	39%	44%
Rasmussen Reports	April 15, 2009	30%	45%
Research 2000	April 6–8, 2009	31%	38%
Rasmussen Reports	February 4, 2009	30%	39%
Rasmussen Reports	December 4, 2008	39%	39%
Public Policy Polling	June 14–16, 2008	27%	32%

== General election results ==
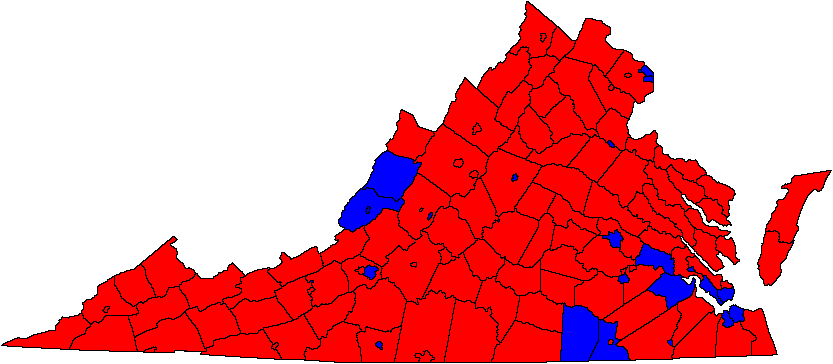
2009 Virginia gubernatorial election map

These results were current as of 3:00 PM Eastern on Wednesday, November 4, with 99.76% of precincts reporting. McDonnell was projected as the winner.

Virginia gubernatorial election, 2009
Party	Candidate	Votes	%
Republican	Bob McDonnell	1,158,865	58.65
Democratic	Creigh Deeds	814,565	41.23
Total votes		1,842,793	100.00
Turnout		1,974,564 of 4,955,755	39.84
