= Charniele Herring =

American politician (born 1969)

Majority Leader of the Virginia House of Delegates
- Incumbent
- Assumed office January 10, 2024
- Preceded by: Terry Kilgore
- In office January 8, 2020 – January 12, 2022
- Preceded by: Todd Gilbert
- Succeeded by: Terry Kilgore

Member of the Virginia House of Delegates
- Incumbent
- Assumed office January 26, 2009
- Preceded by: Brian Moran
- Constituency: 46th district (2009–2024); 4th district (2024–present)

Chair of the Virginia Democratic Party
- In office December 8, 2012 – March 15, 2014
- Preceded by: Brian Moran
- Succeeded by: Dwight Jones

Personal details
- Born: Charniele LeRhonda Herring; September 25, 1969 (age 57) Santo Domingo, Dominican Republic
- Party: Democratic
- Education: George Mason University (BA); Catholic University (JD)
- Website: Campaign website

Charniele LeRhonda Herring (/ʃɑːrˈnɛl ˈhɛrɪŋ/ shar-NEL HERR-ing; born September 25, 1969) is an American politician. She has served in the Virginia House of Delegates since 2009, representing the 4th district, made up of portions of the city of Alexandria and Fairfax County, near Washington, D.C. She is the current majority leader of the Virginia House of Delegates.

Herring is a member of the Democratic Party. She was chosen the House Democratic Caucus Chair in 2015 and in December 2012, she was the first African-American to be elected chair of the Democratic Party of Virginia. In 2020, she was elected to be the majority leader in the Virginia House of Delegates, making her the first woman and the first African-American to hold the position. After April 27, 2022, she was de facto minority leader following the ouster of Eileen Filler-Corn. The Democratic caucus did not immediately choose a replacement for Filler-Corn, but simultaneously voted to retain Herring as their caucus chair. On June 1, 2022, Delegate Don Scott, who had called for the ouster of both Herring and Filler-Corn, was selected as minority leader. Herring became majority leader again when Scott was chosen as House Speaker after the 2023 elections.

== Personal life, non-political career ==
Herring was born in the Dominican Republic. A self-described "Army brat", she traveled frequently as a child. When she was 16 years old, her mother lost her job, and the two lived in a homeless shelter for six months.

Herring studied for three years with the Virginia Ballet School and Company. She earned a B.A. in economics from George Mason University in 1993 and a J.D. from the Columbus School of Law at The Catholic University of America in 1997.

Herring was a VISTA volunteer.

== Political career ==
At age 13, during the presidency of Ronald Reagan, Herring testified before a government commission about health care coverage for military dependent children.

Virginia Governor Tim Kaine appointed Herring to the state's Council on the Status of Women. In 2006, she attended the Political Leaders Program at the University of Virginia's Sorensen Institute for Political Leadership.

=== Virginia House of Delegates ===
Delegate Brian Moran resigned his House seat on December 12, 2008 to spend full-time on his 2009 campaign for governor. Herring immediately announced her candidacy for the vacancy. In a caucus on December 16, Herring won the Democratic nomination, defeating Ariel Gonzalez, director of governmental affairs for the American College of Radiology, 191–43.

In the special election on January 13, 2009, she defeated Republican nominee Joe Murray, an aide to Representative Joe Wilson (R-SC), by 16 votes. Murray requested a recount, which was resolved in Herring's favor; she was sworn in on January 26.

Herring was the first African-American woman ever elected to represent Northern Virginia in the General Assembly. She was elected to serve as the Chairwoman of the Democratic Party in Virginia in 2012 and remained in the role until 2014. In 2015, she was elected Chair of the House Democratic Caucus. After the Democratic Party gained control of the House of Delegates in 2019, Herring was elected to serve as the Majority Leader. She is the first woman and African-American and served in this role until the Republicans regained control of the House of Delegates in 2021.

From 2020–21, she served as chair of the Courts of Justice Committee, the first woman and African-American to hold this role. She currently serves as vice-chair of the Rules committee and chair of the Standards of Conduct Subcommittee.

Herring has a lengthy career advocating for criminal justice reforms in Virginia, and after serving on the Crime Commission for nine years, she was elected as the Chair of the committee in 2020. She has also been a strong proponent of regulating law enforcement use of automated license plate readers, passing legislation in 2025 to create a statewide framework to limit how law enforcement agencies can use the technology.

== Electoral history ==
Date	Election	Candidate	Party	Votes	%
Virginia House of Delegates, 46th district
Jan 13, 2009	Special	Charniele L. Herring	Democratic	1,344	50.15
Jan 13, 2009	Special	Joe R. Murray	Republican	1,328	49.57
Jan 13, 2009	Special	Write Ins		7	0.26
Jan 13, 2009	Special	Brian Moran resigned; seat stayed Democratic			
Nov 3, 2009	General	Charniele L. Herring	Democratic	8,778	63.98
Nov 3, 2009	General	Sasha Gong	Republican	4,929	35.93
Nov 3, 2009	General	Write Ins		11	0.08
Nov 8, 2011	General	Charniele L. Herring	Democratic	7,664	95.19
Nov 8, 2011	General	Write Ins		378	4.80
Nov 5, 2013	General	Charniele L. Herring	Democratic	15,066	95.7
Nov 5, 2013	General	Write Ins		684	4.3
Nov 3, 2015	General	Charniele L. Herring	Democratic	7,507	67.0
Nov 3, 2015	General	Sean T. Lenehan	Republican	3,170	28.3
Nov 3, 2015	General	Andrew G. Bakker	Libertarian	505	4.5
Nov 3, 2015	General	Write Ins		29	0.3
Nov 7, 2017	General	Charniele L. Herring	Democratic	18,947	96.4
Nov 7, 2017	General	Write Ins		706	3.6
Nov 5, 2019	General	Charniele L. Herring	Democratic	12,270	92
Nov 5, 2019	General	Write Ins		1,063	7.9
Nov 2, 2021	General	Charniele L. Herring	Democratic	20,445	92.2
Nov 2, 2021	General	Write Ins		1,740	7.8
Nov 7, 2023	General	Charniele L. Herring	Democratic	10,843	93.2
Nov 7, 2023	General	Write Ins		794	6.8
Nov 4, 2025	General	Charniele L. Herring	Democratic	18,268	95.85
Nov 4, 2025	General	Write Ins		791	4.15

== See also ==
- 2009 Virginia House of Delegates election
- 2011 Virginia House of Delegates election

== Notes ==
Party political offices
Preceded by Brian Moran	Chair of the Virginia Democratic Party; 2012–2014	Succeeded by Dwight Jones
Virginia House of Delegates
Preceded by Todd Gilbert	Majority Leader of the Virginia House of Delegates; 2020–2022	Succeeded by Terry Kilgore
Preceded by Terry Kilgore	Majority Leader of the Virginia House of Delegates; 2024–present	Incumbent
