= Brian Moran =

American politician (born 1959)

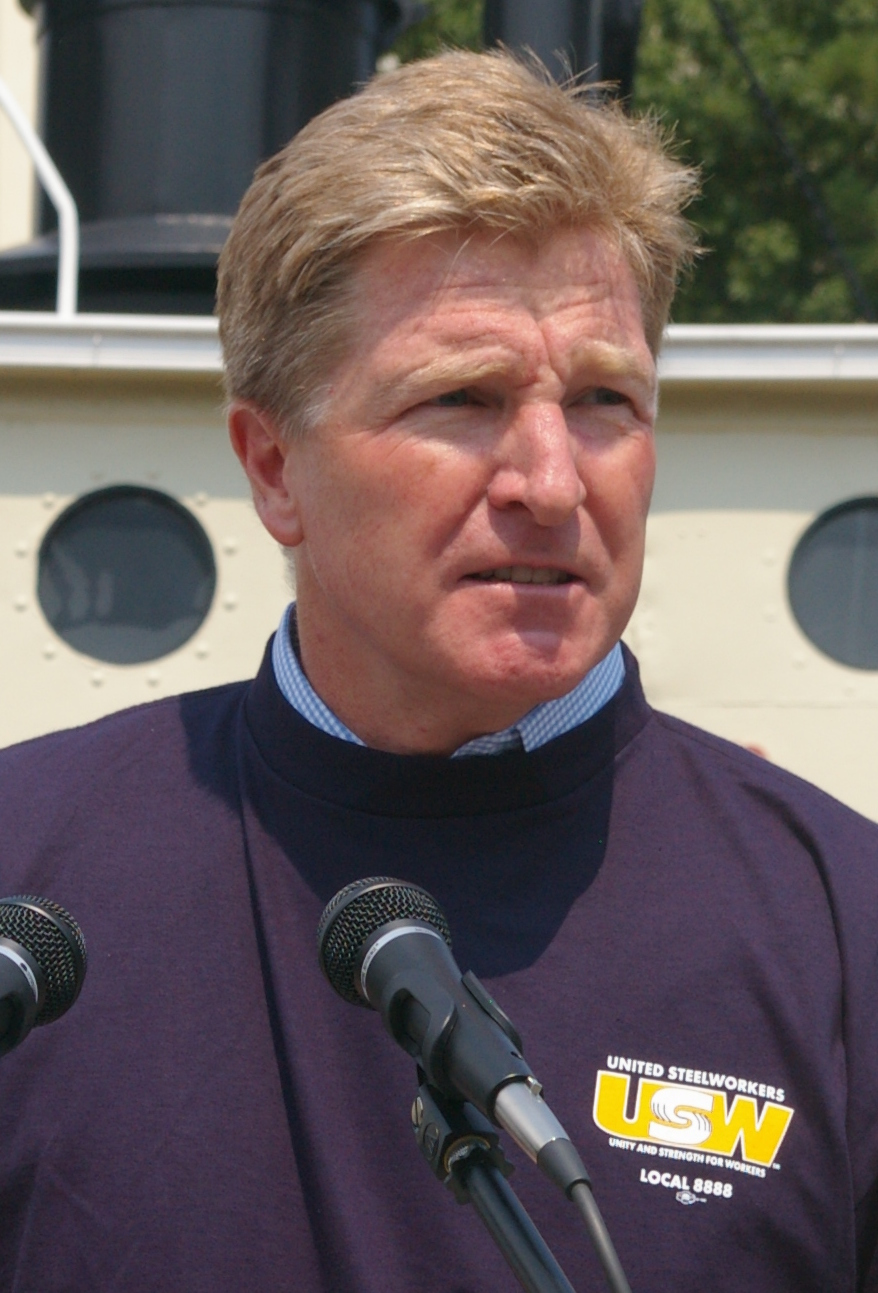

13th Virginia Secretary of Public Safety and Homeland Security
- In office January 11, 2014 – January 15, 2022
- Governor: Terry McAuliffe; Ralph Northam
- Preceded by: Marla Graff Decker
- Succeeded by: Bob Mosier

Chair of the Virginia Democratic Party
- In office December 4, 2010 – December 8, 2012
- Preceded by: Richard Cranwell
- Succeeded by: Charniele Herring

Member of the Virginia House of Delegates from the 46th district
- In office January 10, 1996 – December 12, 2008
- Preceded by: Bernard S. Cohen
- Succeeded by: Charniele Herring

Personal details
- Born: Brian Joseph Moran; September 9, 1959 (age 66) Natick, Massachusetts, U.S.
- Party: Democratic
- Spouse: Karyn Kranz
- Relatives: James Moran Sr. (father); Jim Moran (brother)
- Education: Framingham State University (BA); Catholic University (JD)

Brian Joseph Moran (born September 9, 1959) is an American politician and a member of the Democratic Party. He served as Virginia Secretary of Public Safety from 2014 to 2022, and was a member of the Virginia House of Delegates from 1996 until 2008, representing Northern Virginia's 46th district.

Moran was a primary candidate for Governor of Virginia in 2009, hoping to succeed fellow Democrat Tim Kaine, but on June 9, 2009, he lost the Democratic Party nomination to Creigh Deeds, a member of the Virginia Senate.

== Early life ==
Moran was born in Natick, Massachusetts, the youngest of seven children in a Roman Catholic family of Irish descent. His father is former professional football player James Moran Sr. At age 13, he took the train to Washington, D.C. to watch the Watergate hearings. Moran attended university at Framingham State College, and later the Catholic University of America, where he earned his Juris Doctor from the Columbus School of Law in 1988.

Moran's older brother is Jim Moran, a former U.S. Congressman from Virginia's 8th district. The elder Moran helped raise funds for his brother during his gubernatorial campaign, and both represented areas in Northern Virginia, but the two have differing opinions on several issues such as gun control and parole laws.

== Politics ==
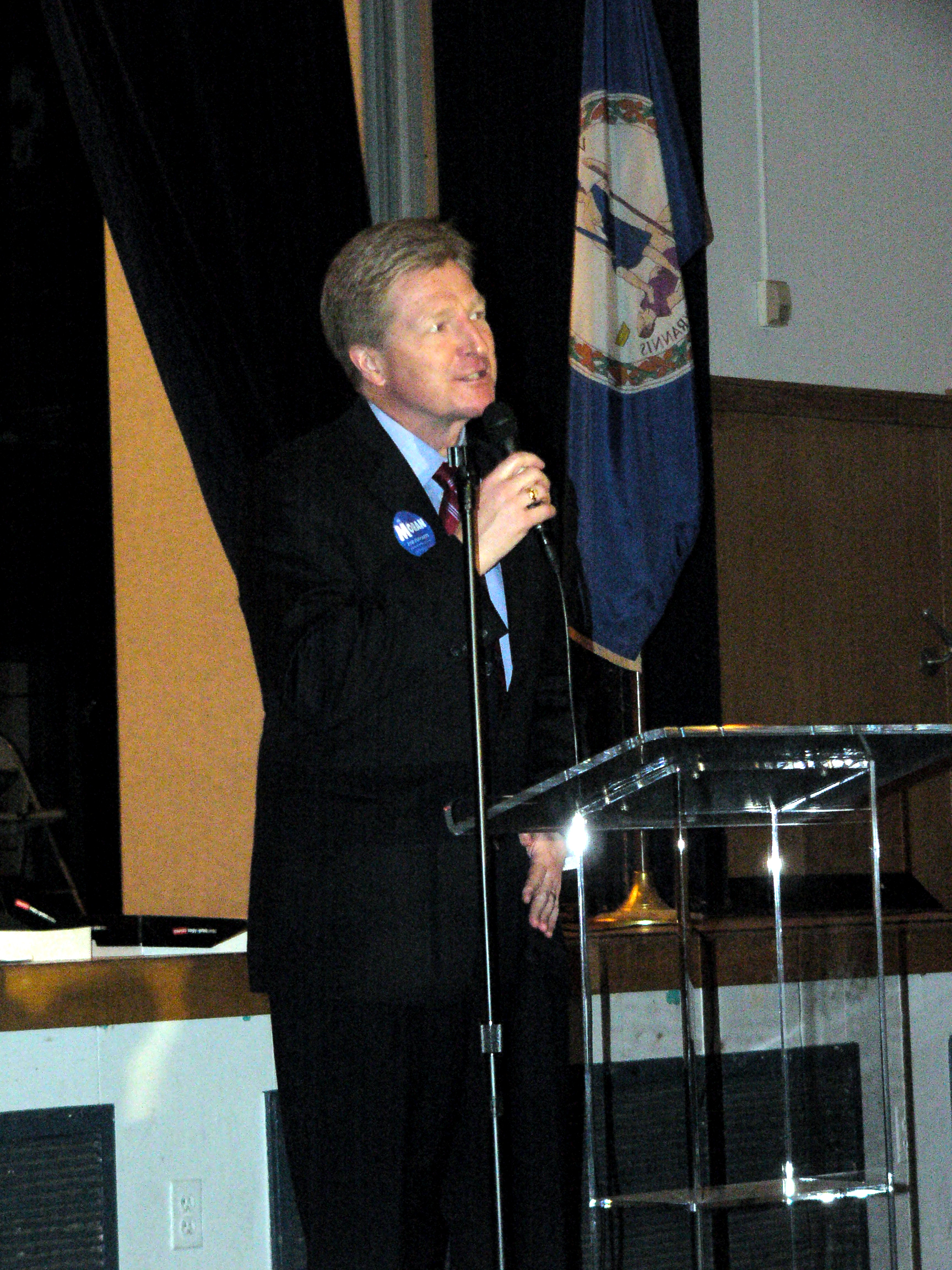
Moran in 2007

After one year clerkship, Moran became an Assistant Commonwealth's Attorney for Arlington County. Moran spent seven years in the Commonwealth Attorney's office, working cases ranging up to rape and murder, before he ran for the House of Delegates in 1995. After being elected, Moran served on the Transportation, Courts of Justice, and Health Welfare and Institutions Committees. He is a repeat winner of Mothers Against Drunk Driving Legislator of the Year, a recipient of the Tech-10 award from the Northern Virginia Technology Council, and a Friend of Business awardee from the Fairfax County Chamber of Commerce.

Moran was named 2006 Legislator of the Year by the Virginia Sheriffs Association. He resigned his seat on December 12, 2008, to pursue the Virginia governorship full-time.

In 2001, Moran was elected to chair the House Democratic Caucus, succeeding Creigh Deeds who was elected to the Virginia State Senate. During his tenure, Democrats added seats in every consecutive general election and ultimately held 44 of the chamber's 100 seats. Moran spent the better part of 2006 and 2007 traveling the state to recruit and support House candidates for the 2007 election, when all 100 Virginia House of Delegates seats were on the ballot (as in every other odd-numbered year). He formed a fundraising committee to campaign for governor in 2009. Mame Reiley served as director of Virginians for Brian Moran, helping Moran in his election bid for governor (from m 2007–09) but he lost the Democratic nomination for governor to Deeds, who received more than twice as many votes as Moran. Moran came in third, Terry McAuliffe second. On December 4, 2010, Moran was elected chair of the Democratic Party of Virginia, defeating Peter Rousselot of Arlington County.

In December 2013, Governor-elect Terry McAuliffe announced he was nominating Moran to serve as Virginia's next Secretary of Public Safety, which is the Cabinet position with supervision of the Virginia State Police, the state's alcoholic beverage control laws, the Virginia Department of Corrections, and the Virginia National Guard. Previous Secretaries of Public Safety have included former Virginia state Attorney General Jerry Kilgore and John W. Marshall. On December 19, 2017, Governor-elect Ralph Northam announced that Moran would continue as Secretary of Public Safety and Homeland Security under his administration.
