= Creigh Deeds =

American politician from Virginia (born 1958)

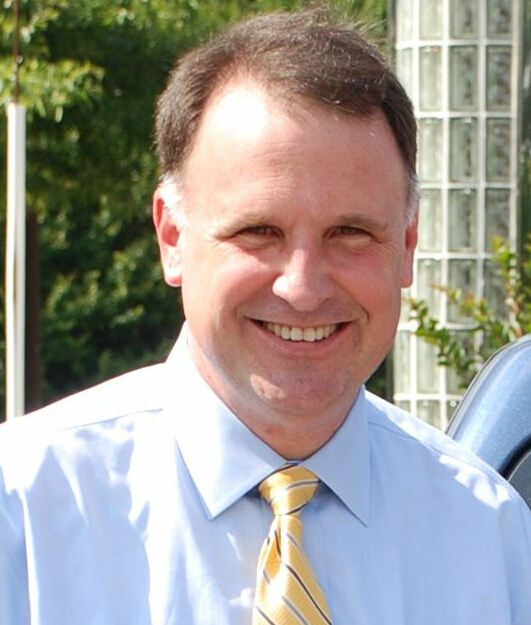
- Deeds in 2009

Member of the Virginia Senate
- Incumbent
- Assumed office December 27, 2001
- Preceded by: Emily Couric
- Constituency: 25th District (2001–2024); 11th District (2024–present)

Member of the Virginia House of Delegates from the 18th district
- In office January 8, 1992 – December 27, 2001
- Preceded by: Bo Trumbo
- Succeeded by: Clay Athey

Personal details
- Born: Robert Creigh Deeds; January 4, 1958 (age 68) Richmond, Virginia, U.S.
- Party: Democratic
- Spouses: Pamela Miller (m. 1981; div. 2010) Siobhan Lomax (m. 2012)
- Children: 4
- Education: Concord University (BA); Wake Forest University (JD)

Robert Creigh Deeds (/ˈkriː/; born January 4, 1958) is an American lawyer and politician serving as a member of the Senate of Virginia representing the 11th district since 2024, and previously the 25th district since 2001. Previously, he was the Democratic nominee for Attorney General of Virginia in 2005 and Governor of Virginia in 2009. He was defeated in both of those races by Republican Bob McDonnell. Deeds lost by just 360 votes in 2005, but was defeated by a wide margin of over 17 percentage points in 2009. He was a member of the Virginia House of Delegates from 1992 to 2001.

== Personal life ==
Deeds was born on January 4, 1958, in Richmond, Virginia. The name "Creigh" is a family surname, originating from Confederate sympathizer David Creigh, a distant relative. His family moved early in his life to Bath County. After graduating from Bath County High School, Deeds enrolled in Concord College. He then entered the Wake Forest University School of Law, from which he received his Juris Doctor in 1984.

Deeds married Pamela Miller in February 1981. They divorced in February 2010, with an article in The Washington Post describing the marriage as "a casualty of a nearly 20-year pursuit of a lifelong ambition that kept [Deeds] away from home".

Deeds married Siobhan Gilbride Lomax of Lexington, Virginia, in June 2012.

=== Stabbing ===
On November 19, 2013, Deeds was stabbed multiple times at his home in Bath County, Virginia by his 24-year-old son, Gus, who then shot himself. Deeds was initially reported to be in critical condition at University of Virginia Medical Center. Although a judge had issued an involuntary commitment order for Gus, and despite an intensive search, no available hospital bed could be found to provide him mental health treatment in the days before the attempted murder and he was released home without the ordered treatment. As a consequence, several changes were made in the screening and admission process for people undergoing an emergency psychiatric examination in Virginia. These changes include 2014 Virginia Senate Bill 260, sponsored by Deeds.

== Political career ==
=== House of Delegates ===
Deeds won election to the Virginia House of Delegates 1991 by defeating incumbent Emmett Hanger in a 57%–41% victory. This started a nine-year career in the Virginia House of Delegates.

In the House of Delegates, Deeds introduced several legislative proposals, including introducing Megan's Law to the Virginia General Assembly, which was passed in 1998. Other legislation promoted by Deeds include environmental protection and anti-drug laws. In 1994 Deeds supported and was a major co-sponsor of George Allen's initiative to abolish parole for those convicted of a felony.

=== State Senate ===
Deeds won a special state senate election in 2001 to succeed Emily Couric, who had died of pancreatic cancer. During Deeds' Senate tenure, legislation that Deeds proposed includes:

- SB150 – Requires that direct recording electronic devices be equipped to produce a contemporaneous paper record of each vote that can be verified by the voter and used in recounts. (2006)
- SB891 – Requires the board of visitors of each public two-year and four-year institution of higher education to provide reduced in-state tuition rates for the children of faculty and staff members employed by the institution, effective for the 2008–2009 academic year. (2007) Not enacted, rolled into SB982 and left in the Senate Finance Committee.
- SB34 – Increases the mandatory retirement age for judges from age 70 to age 75. (2008)
- SB669 – Permits ABC agents to check the national criminal database when conducting background checks on prospective licensees. (2008)

Deeds was also a proponent of a Senate resolution to close Virginia's gun show loophole, and made public appearances to generate support for the measure. On March 4, 2026, Deeds introduced a Virginia Senate resolution honoring the life of renowned based Norfolk-based African American Virginia politician Jerrauld Jones, which passed in the Virginia Senate on March 10, 2026.

=== Attorney General campaign ===
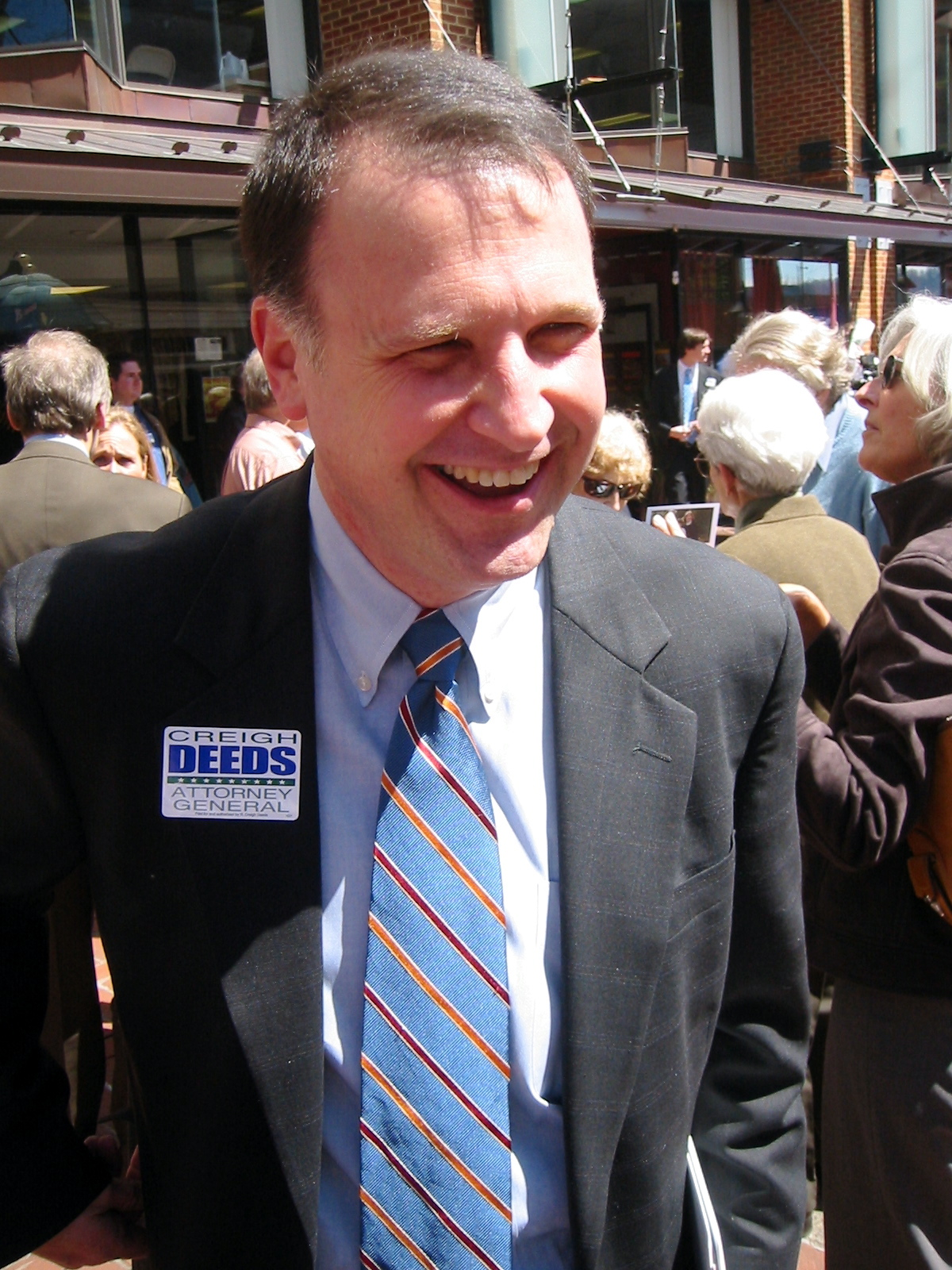
Democratic Senator Creigh Deeds preparing to formally announce his candidacy for Virginia Attorney General at an event in Charlottesville, Virginia.

In 2005, Deeds and John Edwards—a Virginia state senator from Roanoke—each announced that they planned to run for Attorney General of Virginia in the Democratic primary. Edwards later decided not to run, leaving Deeds as the sole candidate for the Democratic nomination for the office.

In the general election campaign, running against Republican nominee Bob McDonnell, Deeds ran on his record as a moderate Democrat who supported gun rights, strong punishment for criminals, and the death penalty. Deeds' stance on gun control included supporting a ban on semi-automatic firearms, but that did not prevent him from earning the endorsement of the NRA, which cited his patronage of a state constitutional amendment that guaranteed the right to hunt. McDonnell outspent Deeds by almost three million dollars (McDonnell spent $5,962,067 to Deeds' $3,103,585); $2,084,089 of McDonnell's campaign contributions were funneled through the Republican State Leadership Committee, exploiting a loophole in state law that was closed by the General Assembly shortly after the election.

The initial result of the vote was 49.96%–49.95%, with Deeds behind by fewer than 350 votes. Due to the closeness of the race's outcome, Deeds asked for a recount. Judge Theodore Markow of Richmond set the recount for December 20, 2005, a date so close to the inauguration that invitations to the event were mailed without a name for the attorney general to be inaugurated. The recount reaffirmed the earlier outcome, and McDonnell became attorney general.

=== Gubernatorial campaign ===
Deeds announced his intention to seek the Democratic nomination for governor on December 13, 2007. At the end of a close three-way race against former DNC chair Terry McAuliffe and former State Delegate Brian Moran, Deeds won by a large margin, taking about 50 percent of the vote in the June 9, 2009, Democratic Primary. He again faced McDonnell, the Republican nominee, in the November 2009 general election. McDonnell was selected at his party's nominating convention. Deeds lost the gubernatorial race by a wide margin to McDonnell, 41.25% to 58.61%.

== Electoral history ==
To date, both of the elections Creigh Deeds has lost were to his 2005 Attorney General opponent Bob McDonnell, to whom he also lost in the 2009 Gubernatorial race.

From 1991 through 2023, Deeds has not lost an election or primary for Virginia House or Virginia Senate.

Redistricting in Virginia affected state elections in 2023. From 2001 through 2023, he represented the 25th District in the Virginia Senate. For the 2023 election, Deeds decided to move to the Charlottesville area and compete in the completely redrawn State Senate 11th District, which shared 60% of the electorate with his previous district.

With the move in 2023 came a serious primary challenge from State Delegate Sally L. Hudson, whom he narrowly defeated. Deeds went on to easily defeat Republican Philip Hamilton in the 2023 general election.

== Political positions ==
=== Taxes ===
In January 2009, Deeds proposed up to a $10,000 tax credit for businesses that made "job-creating investments" and supported exemption of the sales tax on the purchase of solar or wind energy systems for homeowners. He has stated that he will not make a no-tax-increase pledge and wrote in The Washington Post that he would support a new gas tax to fund transportation. In 2008, Deeds voted for a bill in the State Senate which would raise the Virginia gas tax $0.06 per gallon over the next 6 years.

=== Consumer advocacy ===
Deeds is in favor of tougher sanctions on lenders that deal subprime mortgages. Additionally, he appears to be in favor of health care cost transparency, insurance reforms, and protections for consumers in the health system.

=== Death penalty ===
Deeds supports removing the "trigger-man" clause, which restricts the death penalty to those who physically committed the action, in Virginia capital punishment law. In 2005, Deeds said that he disagreed with the Supreme Court ruling in Roper v. Simmons, which made it unconstitutional to execute juveniles. He argued that it was the jury's duty to determine when and where the death penalty should come into play. In 2021, Deeds voted to abolish the death penalty in Virginia.

=== LGBTQ ===
In 2006, Deeds was part of the unanimous Democratic coalition that voted to oppose an amendment to the Virginia State Constitution that would ban same-sex marriage. He voted against it because he believed the Amendment went too far in its definition of marriage. In July 2009, Deeds stated he believed "Marriage is between a man and a woman" and declined to say gay marriage is a civil right. Deeds has supported workplace protections and LGBTQ rights in the General Assembly and criticized attempts to roll back these protections such as in September 2025, when he went after Winsome Earle-Sears.

=== Gun control ===
Deeds was endorsed by the NRA during his 2005 Attorney General run over Republican Bob McDonnell. Deeds supports a state ban on civilian ownership of assault weapons and signed a pledge to repeal the law restricting citizens from buying more than one handgun a month. The law was repealed by his opponent, Bob McDonnell, in February 2012. He voted against the Castle Doctrine (Senate Bill 876) multiple times and previously proposed a measure that would eliminate private sales at gun shows. The bill's proponents called it a measure to prevent another disaster like the Virginia Tech massacre even though the shooter purchased his firearms from licensed gun dealers and not at a gun show. This measure ultimately failed. In February 2011, Deeds was one of eight senators on the Senate Courts of Justice Committee who "passed by indefinitely" House Bill 1573, defeating the bill by an 8 to 4 margin. In February 2020, Deeds broke party ranks to shelve House Bill 961 which would have prohibited the sale and transport of assault firearms, certain firearm magazines, silencers, and trigger activators. This effectively blocked the legislation championed by Gov. Northam. More recently he has come out as pro-gun-reform/control, passing an assault weapons ban and other things like background checks.

=== Illegal immigration ===
In 2009, Deeds voted to make undocumented immigrants ineligible for in-state tuition and state and local benefits. He voted in favor of designating English as the official language of the United States. In 2024, he voted for healthcare for children under age 19 regardless of immigration status largely on the grounds that early and preventative care saves money by cutting down on later emergency room visits.

=== 2010 redistricting ===
Deeds introduced SB926 to create a seven-member non-partisan committee to oversee the 2010–2011 redistricting plan. In 2009, the bill passed the State Senate, 39–0, but was killed by the House of Delegates' Committee on Privileges and Elections. In 2010, the bill once again passed the Senate with unanimous vote of 40–0 before once again being killed in committee by the House of Delegates. Deeds said that, if elected Governor of Virginia, he would use his veto power and amendment powers to try to force the House of Delegates into accepting a version of SB926.

=== Education ===
Deeds' 2009 gubernatorial campaign issued a plan called "Better Schools. Better Jobs" to detail Deeds' plans regarding education. The plan called for up to $15,000 in student loans for 4-year college students, and for creating partnerships with community colleges and traditional universities.

=== Transportation ===
Deeds was criticized by the McDonnell campaign for lacking a coherent transportation plan. During the second debate between the candidates, McDonnell held up a blank sheet of paper as a representation of the Deeds plan. Deeds later wrote a column in The Washington Post laying out his plan, which included the possibility of a new gas tax or other tax.

Virginia House of Delegates
Preceded by Bo Trumbo	Member of the Virginia House of Delegates from the 18th district 1992–2001	Succeeded by Clay Athey
Senate of Virginia
Preceded by Emily Couric	Member of the Virginia Senate from the 25th district 2001–2024	Succeeded by Richard Stuart
Preceded by Amanda Chase	Member of the Virginia Senate from the 11th district 2024–Present	Incumbent
Party political offices
Preceded by Donald McEachin	Democratic nominee for Attorney General of Virginia; 2005	Succeeded by Steve Shannon
Preceded by Tim Kaine	Democratic nominee for Governor of Virginia; 2009	Succeeded by Terry McAuliffe
