= T. J. Anderson =

African American composer, conductor, educator

Thomas Jefferson Anderson, Jr
- Born: 17 August 1928 (age 98)
- Education: Professor of Music
- Occupations: composer, conductor, orchestrator and educator
- Mother: Anita Turpeau Anderson
- Relatives: David Turpeau (grandfather); Leontine T. Kelly (aunt)

Thomas Jefferson "T.J." Anderson, Jr. (born August 17, 1928) is an American composer, conductor, orchestrator and educator.

== Early life ==
Born in Coatesville, Pennsylvania, Anderson has written over 80 works ranging from operas and symphonies to choral pieces, chamber music, and band music. He has composed commissioned works for the Bill T. Jones/Arnie Zane Dance Company and cellist Yo Yo Ma.

== Education ==
The beginning of his college education was at West Virginia State University. He then attended Pennsylvania State University and received his bachelor's degree there in music. Afterwards at that same school in 1951 he got his master's degree in music education. He earned a Ph.D. in composition from the University of Iowa in 1958, and was Austin Fletcher Professor of Music Emeritus at Tufts University, from 1972 to his retirement in 1990.

== Work and musical influence ==
Anderson worked at Langston University in Langston, Oklahoma, as a music professor from 1958 to 1963. There, he became the chair of the music department. He was professor of music at Tennessee State University from 1963 to 1969. While there, he was named composer in residence with the Atlanta Symphony Orchestra. He had a three-year tenure with the Atlanta Symphony Orchestra from 1968 to 1971.

During the period of time he spent with the Atlanta Symphony Orchestra, Anderson orchestrated Scott Joplin's opera, Treemonisha, originally written in 1911. In 1972, Joplin's opera appeared on stage in full for the very first time. The first opera that Anderson wrote was Soldier Boy. This work was based on a libretto by Leon Forrest, who was a good friend of Anderson. Soldier Boy was commissioned by Indiana University. After it, came other works, such as Walker which was about David Walker, an anti-slavery activist.

In 1972, Anderson was hired as a professor of music and department chair at Tufts University in Medford, Massachusetts, where he worked until 1990.

In 2002, the Cantata Singers and Ensemble commissioned Anderson to create an oratorio Slavery Documents 2. The work was based on Donald Sur's Slavery Documents and Loren Schweininger's The Southern Debate Over Slavery.

Anderson also taught at institutions in France, Brazil, Switzerland, Italy, and Germany.

== Awards and honors ==
In 1983, he was awarded an honorary Doctor of Music degree by the College of the Holy Cross in Worcester, Massachusetts. In 2005, he was awarded an honorary Doctor of Music degree by Bates College in Lewiston, Maine. In 2007, Tufts University awarded him an honorary Doctor of Music.

== Family ==
Anderson has three children: Janet, Anita, and Thomas J. Anderson, III (who also goes by "T.J."), is a poet and professor of English at Hollins University in Roanoke, Virginia. The younger Anderson is married to Pauline Kaldas, a poet, author, and fellow English professor at Hollins University.

== Unitarian Universalism ==
Anderson served from 1986 to 1991 on the commission that produced Singing the Living Tradition, a hymnal published by the Unitarian Universalist Association in 1993. He is a member of the U.U. congregation at Chapel Hill, North Carolina.
