= Keesha Sharp =

American actress and television director (born 1973)

- Born: Keesha Ulricka Fleth; June 9, 1973 (age 53); Rochester, New York, U.S.
- Occupations: Actress, director
- Years active: 2000–present
- Spouse: Brad Sharp (m. 1997)
- Children: 1

Keesha Ulricka Sharp (née Fleth; born June 9, 1973) is an American actress and television director. She played Monica Charles Brooks in the UPN/The CW comedy series, Girlfriends (2002–08), for which she received a nomination for NAACP Image Award for Outstanding Supporting Actress in a Comedy Series.

Sharp has also appeared in films include American Adobo (2002), Why Did I Get Married? (2007), and from 2010 to 2013 co-starred in the TBS sitcom, Are We There Yet?. In 2016, she played Dale Cochran, the wife of Johnnie Cochran, in the FX anthology drama series, The People v. O. J. Simpson: American Crime Story. From 2016 to 2019, Sharp starred as Trish Murtaugh in the Fox police comedy-drama series, Lethal Weapon, for which she received NAACP Image Award for Outstanding Actress in a Comedy Series nomination.

== Life and career ==
Sharp was born in Rochester, New York. After graduating cum laude from The Boston Conservatory, Sharp set her sights on the stage. She performed in the Broadway National Tour of Carousel, debuted Off-Broadway in Michael Bradford's Living in the Wind and played eight different roles in the interactive comedy Eat the Runt. Other theatre performances include Abyssinia, Aida, Thunder Knockin, Jitney, The Producers, Big Street, Suburb and Joe Turner's Come and Gone. On television, she guest starred on Welcome to New York, Third Watch, and Law & Order: Special Victims Unit, before moving to Los Angeles.

In 2002, Sharp was cast on the CW comedy series Girlfriends, which she played William Dent's (Reggie Hayes) girlfriend, and later wife, Monica. Her role garnered a nomination for an NAACP Image Award for Outstanding Supporting Actress in a Comedy Series. The series ended in 2008. From 2005 to 2006, she also had the recurring role on Everybody Hates Chris as Sheila Ridenhour. Sharp also had roles in films Malibu's Most Wanted, Leprechaun: Back 2 tha Hood, Never Die Alone and Why Did I Get Married?.

After Girlfriends, Sharp had guest starring roles on The Game, Cold Case, Melissa & Joey, Elementary and The Exes. From 2010 to 2013, she was a regular cast member on the TBS sitcom, Are We There Yet?. In 2015, Sharp was cast as Dale Cochran, the wife of Johnnie Cochran (played by Courtney B. Vance), in the FX anthology drama series, American Crime Story. In 2016, she was cast in a series regular role opposite Damon Wayans Sr. in the Fox series Lethal Weapon playing Trish Murtaugh (played by Darlene Love in the Lethal Weapon film series). Golden Brooks, her Girlfriends co-star, originally was cast in the role, but was replaced by Sharp during filming of pilot episode. Later that year, she was cast as Thurgood Marshall's wife in the biographical film Marshall starring Chadwick Boseman.

In 2018, Sharp secured the rights to John Williams’ 2013 biography America’s Mistress: The Life and Times of Eartha Kitt. She was slated to star as Kitt and to produce the film alongside her husband, Brad Sharp.

In 2019, Sharp was cast in the final season of the Fox musical drama series Empire.

In 2022, Sharp joined the third season of Power Book II: Ghost as a series regular.

== Personal life ==
Sharp married actor and singer-songwriter Brad Sharp on August 1, 1997. The couple have been together since high school and have a son named Solomon.

== Filmography ==
=== Film ===
Year	Title	Role	Notes
2001	Pootie Tang	Monique	
2001	American Adobo	Debbie	
2003	Malibu's Most Wanted	Sister #1	
2003	Leprechaun: Back 2 tha Hood	Chanel	Video
2004	Never Die Alone	Edna	
2005	What If in This Life	Rape Victim	Short
2007	Why Did I Get Married?	Pam	
2008	Shattered!	Angela	
2014	The 636	Hope Rigby	Short
2015	Sayeneshin	Wife	Short
2015	Christian	Robyn	Short
2016	Killer Coach	Gina Morgan	TV movie
2017	Fixed	Daisy	
2017	Born Guilty	Leslie	
2017	You Have a Nice Flight	Kristen	
2017	Marshall	Vivian Burey	
2020	A Christmas Surprise	Demetria	TV movie
2021	Do Better	Wisdom (voice)	Short
2022	Dark My Light	Emily	
2022	Green Lantern: Beware My Power	Vixen / Mari McCabe (voice)	Direct-to-Video
2022	Titanic 666	Captain Celeste Rhoades	
2023	Spring Breakthrough	Monica Rollins	TV movie
2024	Justice League: Crisis on Infinite Earths	Vixen / Mari McCabe (voice)	Direct-to-Video

=== Television ===
Year	Title	Role	Notes
2000	Welcome to New York	Lauren	Episode: "The Crier"
2001	Third Watch	Grace	Episode: "Walking Wounded"
2001	Law & Order: Special Victims Unit	Charlene	Episode: "Pique"
2002–2008	Girlfriends	Monica Charles Brooks	Recurring Cast: Season 3-6, Main Cast: Season 7-8
2004	The Tracy Morgan Show	Lindy Berry	Recurring Cast: Season 1
2004	Still Standing	Lexi	Episode: "Still Flirting"
2005–2006	Everybody Hates Chris	Sheila Ridenhour	Recurring Cast: Season 1
2009	America's Got Talent	Herself	Episode: "Episode #4.25"
2009	The Game	Keesha James	Episode: "Hill Street Blues"
2010	Cold Case	Chantel Jones	Episode: "Bombers"
2010	Detroit 1-8-7	Keri Rader	Episode: "Royal Bubbles/Needle Drop"
2010–2013	Are We There Yet?	Gigi	Main Cast
2013	Melissa & Joey	Maggie	Episode: "Teach Your Children"
2013	Elementary	Mistress Felicia	Episode: "Poison Pen"
2013	Instant Mom	Lynn Lawson	Episode: "Dances with She-Wolves"
2014	Bad Teacher	Denise	Recurring Cast
2014	The Exes	Dee Dee	Episode: "Catch It 'Cause You Can"
2015	The Player	Maya	Recurring Cast
2016	American Crime Story	Sylvia Dale Cochran	Recurring Cast
2016–2019	Lethal Weapon	Trish Murtaugh	Main Cast
2018	Hell's Kitchen	Herself/Restaurant Patron	Episode: "Trying to Pasta Test"
2018–2019	The Good Fight	Naomi Nivola	Guest: Season 2, Recurring Cast: Season 3
2019–2020	Empire	Dr. Paula Wick	Recurring Cast: Season 6
2022	Inside the Black Box	Herself	Episode: "Condola Rashad, Keesha Sharp and Jeff Byrd Visit the Black Box"
2023	Power Book II: Ghost	Professor Harper Bonet	Main Cast: Season 3

==== Directing ====
Year	Title	Notes
2012	Are We There Yet?	Episode: "The Concussion Episode"
2014	Half-Off	Director and writer
2018	Lethal Weapon	Episode: "Panama"
2021	Black Lightning	Episode: "The Book of Ruin: Chapter Four: Lyding"
2021	The Last O.G.	2 episodes
2021	Our Kind of People	Episode: "Sistervention..."
2022	Charmed	Episode: "The Tallyman Cometh"
2022	All American: Homecoming	Episode: "Free Your Mind"
2023	Bel-Air	3 episodes
2023–2024	Found	2 episodes
2025	Chicago P.D.	Episode: "Name Image Likeness"

== Awards and nominations ==
Year	Awards	Category	Recipient	Outcome
2008	NAACP Image Awards	NAACP Image Award for Outstanding Supporting Actress in a Comedy Series	"Girlfriends"	Nominated
2017	Black Reel Awards	Black Reel Award for Outstanding Supporting Actress, TV Movie or Limited Series	"American Crime Story"	Nominated
2017	NAACP Image Awards	NAACP Image Award for Outstanding Supporting Actress in a Motion Picture	"Lethal Weapon"	Nominated
2018	NAACP Image Awards	NAACP Image Award for Outstanding Supporting Actress in a Motion Picture	"Marshall"	Nominated
