= Separate but Equal (film) =

- VHS cover art
- Genre: Drama; History
- Written by: George Stevens Jr.
- Directed by: George Stevens Jr.
- Starring: Sidney Poitier; Gloria Foster; Tommy Hollis; Burt Lancaster
- Music by: Carl Davis
- Country of origin: United States
- Original language: English

Production
- Executive producers: Stan Margulies; George Stevens Jr.
- Production locations: Orlando, Florida; Charleston, South Carolina; Manhattan; Saluda, South Carolina; Washington, D.C.
- Cinematography: Nick Knowland
- Editor: John W. Wheeler
- Running time: 194 minutes
- Production companies: New Liberty Films; Republic Pictures

Original release
- Network: ABC
- Release: April 7 – April 8, 1991

Separate but Equal is a 1991 American two-part television miniseries depicting the landmark Supreme Court desegregation case Brown v. Board of Education, based on the phrase "Separate but equal". The film stars Sidney Poitier as lead NAACP attorney Thurgood Marshall, Richard Kiley as Chief Justice Earl Warren, Burt Lancaster (in his final television role) as lawyer John W. Davis (loser of Briggs v. Elliott and the Democratic candidate in the 1924 US presidential election), Cleavon Little as lawyer and judge Robert L. Carter, and Lynne Thigpen as Ruth Alice Stovall.

In 1991, the Academy of Television Arts and Sciences rewarded the film with the Outstanding Miniseries award. The film received 8 nominations for Emmy Awards in 1991 and won 2, and received 3 nominations for Golden Globe Awards in 1992.

== Plot ==
The issue before the United States Supreme Court is whether the equal protection clause of the 14th Amendment of the U.S. Constitution mandates the individual states to desegregate public schools; that is, whether the nation's "separate but equal" policy heretofore upheld under the law, is unconstitutional. The issue is placed before the Court by Brown v. Board of Education and its companion case, Briggs v. Elliott. Many of the justices personally believe segregation is morally unacceptable, but have difficulty justifying the idea legally under the 14th Amendment. Marshall and Davis argue their respective cases. Marshall argues the equal protection clause extends far enough to the states to prohibit segregated schools. Davis counters that control of public schools is a "states' rights" issue that Congress never intended to be covered by the 14th Amendment when it was passed.

Taking the case under advisement, the stalemated justices agree to allow Marshall and Davis an opportunity to reargue their respective cases as to whether the equal protection clause specifically extends to the desegregation of schools. In the interim, Chief Justice Fred M. Vinson dies and is replaced by a non-jurist, Governor Earl Warren of California.

Meanwhile, Marshall and his staff are fruitless in finding any research showing the Civil-War era crafters of the 14th Amendment in 1866 intended for schools to be desegregated. On the other hand, Davis and his Ivy League-educated staff find several examples of segregated schools having existed ever since the passage of the equal protection clause. Finally, the NAACP staffers discover a quote by Thaddeus Stevens delivered on the floor of the Senate during the debate over the Amendment, which directly states segregation is constitutionally and morally wrong. They place it at the front of their brief. Marshall's argument is compelling.

As the case is taken under advisement a second time, new Chief Justice Warren is taken on a tour of Gettysburg Battlefield by his black chauffeur. He also realizes that his chauffeur must sleep in the car because there are no lodging places available for him because of his race. Warren discovers a majority of the Court agrees to strike down the "separate but equal" laws; however, it is important to him that the Court be unanimous. He writes an opinion and takes copies to all of the dissenting justices trying to convince each one of the significance of unanimity. They finally all agree. Warren reads his opinion which states that segregation "has no place" in American society. Even opposing counsel, John W. Davis, privately agrees it is time for society to change.

The epilogue acknowledges Thurgood Marshall's own ascent to the Supreme Court in 1967 and explains that the plaintiff in the companion case, a black student named Briggs, never attended an integrated school.

== Cast ==
- Sidney Poitier as Thurgood Marshall
- Burt Lancaster as Attorney John W. Davis
- Richard Kiley as Chief Justice Earl Warren
- Cleavon Little as NAACP Attorney Robert L. "Bob" Carter
- Gloria Foster as Buster Marshall
- John McMartin as Governor James F. Byrnes
- Mark Hammer as Associate Justice Stanley Forman Reed
- Graham Beckel as Josiah C. Tulley
- Jeffrey Wright as William Coleman
- Ed Hall as Reverend J. A. Delaine
- Lynne Thigpen as Ruth Alice Stovall
- Hallie Foote as Julia Davis
- Macon McCalman as W. B. Springer
- Randle Mell as Charles L. Black Jr.
- Cheryl Lynn Bruce as Gladys Hampton
- Tommy Hollis as Harry Briggs
- John Rothman as NAACP Attorney Jack Greenberg
- Damien Leake as Dr. Kenneth Clark
- Mike Nussbaum as Supreme Court Justice Felix Frankfurter
- William Hardy as Supreme Court Justice Tom C. Clark
- William Cain as Federal Judge J. Waties Waring
- Michael Flippo as Tom
- Michael L. Nesbitt as Man in Audience
- Ric Reitz as Mr. Straight
- Edward Seamon as E. R. Crow
- Pearce Venning as Harry Briggs Jr.
- Laurens Moore as Judge
- Michael Noel as Businessman in Train Station
- I. Russell Weinstein as Reporter at Phone Booth

== Critical reception ==
John Leonard called the film "splendid" and "a triumph" in New York Magazine. While generally praising the film, Richard Zoglin in Time Magazine called the portrayal of Warren's visit to Gettysburg "simplistic." A contemporary review in the Orlando Sentinel called the film "one of television's finest hours," but also called the scene of Warren at Gettysburg "hokey melodrama" and suggested that it was apocryphal.

== See also ==
- Civil rights movement in popular culture
- Supreme Court of the United States in fiction
