= Cecilia Suyat Marshall =

American civil rights activist (1928–2022)

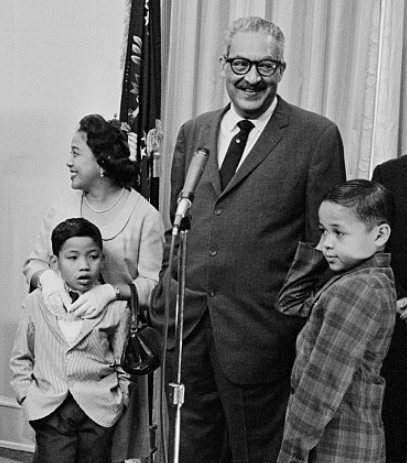
- Cecilia (left) along with Thurgood Marshall (right), and their sons in 1965
- Born: Cecilia Suyat; July 20, 1928; Pu'unene, Maui, Territory of Hawaii, U.S.
- Died: November 22, 2022 (aged 94); Falls Church, Virginia, U.S.
- Occupations: Civil rights activist and historian
- Spouse: Thurgood Marshall (m. 1955; died 1993)
- Children: Thurgood Marshall Jr.; John W. Marshall

Cecilia Suyat Marshall (July 20, 1928 – November 22, 2022) was an American civil rights activist and historian from Hawaii who was married to Thurgood Marshall, the first African-American U.S. Supreme Court Justice, from 1955 until his death in 1993. She was of Filipino descent. Her life is featured in the National Museum of African American History and Culture at the Smithsonian and she was recorded by the Library of Congress regarding her experiences with civil rights in the United States. In the 1940s and 1950s, she served as a stenographer and private secretary for the NAACP in Washington, D.C.

== Early life and career ==
Cecilia "Cissy" Suyat was born in Pu'unene, Maui, in Hawaii on July 20, 1928. Her parents emigrated from the Philippines in 1910. Her father owned a printing company and her mother died when she was young. She was raised in Hawaii with many siblings.

Suyat moved to New York City to live with her maternal uncle and aunt, on the advice of her father, before starting work for the NAACP in Washington, D.C. In her first assignment, she picketed the film The Birth of a Nation at a local theater, which soon stopped showing the film. Suyat took night classes at Columbia University to become a court stenographer and eventually became the private secretary of Dr. Gloster B. Current, the head of the NAACP, from 1948 to 1955. She played a role in the historic Brown v. Board of Education case.

== Marriage ==
Suyat met Thurgood Marshall, then married him in 1955 after Marshall's previous wife, Vivian Burey, died of lung cancer. Suyat married Marshall on December 17, 1955. Roy Wilkins, who was secretary of the NAACP, presided over the service at St. Philip's Episcopal Church in Harlem, New York. Visitors to their apartment included Martin Luther King Jr. and Rosa Parks.

Suyat and Marshall were the parents of John W. Marshall, a former Virginia Secretary of Public Safety and former U.S. Marshals Service Director, and Thurgood Marshall Jr. Juan Williams reported Suyat worked extensively in Marshall's later years to keep his explosions of "frustration with the conservative court and what remained of the Civil Rights Movement" out of the public, afraid that they would embarrass him.

== Later life and death ==
Suyat spent her life preserving history and continued to fight for civil rights after her husband's death. She believed that there is still a long way to go. She gave an oral history interview for the Library of Congress conducted by Emilye Crosby in Washington, D.C., on June 30, 2013. Her story is now featured in the National Museum of African American History and Culture at the Smithsonian in Washington, D.C. The interview was authorized by the United States Congress on May 12, 2009, in the Civil Rights History Project Act of 2009 (Public Law 111-19). The exhibit was created as part of a 5-year initiative to survey existing oral history collections with relevance to the Civil Rights Movement and record new interviews with people who participated in the social and political movement.

Suyat attended the opening of a new school building for the Thurgood Marshall Academy for Learning and Social Change in New York City's Harlem neighborhood in 2004.

Suyat died on November 22, 2022, at the age of 94 in Falls Church, Virginia.
