= Bob Mosier =

American government official and law enforcement officer

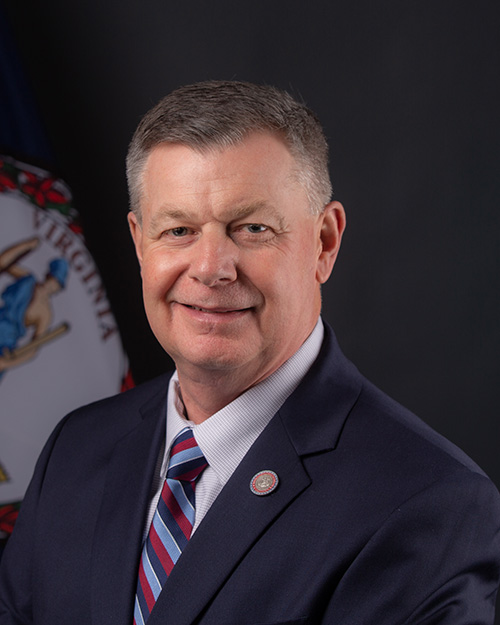
- Official Portrait, 2022

9th Virginia Secretary of Public Safety and Homeland Security
- In office Jan 12, 2022 – June 1, 2023
- Governor: Glenn Youngkin
- Preceded by: Brian Moran
- Succeeded by: Terry Cole

60th Sheriff of Fauquier County, Virginia
- In office January 1, 2016 – January 11, 2022
- Preceded by: Charlie Ray Fox, Jr.
- Succeeded by: Jeremy Falls

Personal details
- Party: Republican
- Education: Northern Virginia Community College (AAA)

Robert "Bob" Mosier is an American law enforcement executive and former government official who served as the 9th Virginia Secretary of Public Safety and Homeland Security in the Cabinet of Glenn Youngkin. A member of the Republican Party, he served as the Sheriff of Fauquier County from 2016-2022 and previously served as a senior advisor at the U.S. Department of State.

== Career ==
Mosier started his career in the Fauquier County Sheriff's Office. In 1996 he was selected by the State Department to serve in Bosnia and Herzegovina with the International Police Task Force. Following his tenure, he served as the Director of Investigations for the International Justice Mission, focusing on international investigations of human rights violations including human trafficking, violence against women and children, and police abuse of power. He later served as a senior advisor at the Bureau of International Narcotics and Law Enforcement Affairs.

In 2015, Mosier was elected the 60th Sheriff of Fauquier County, and was re-elected in 2019. Governor Ralph Northam appointed Mosier to the Substance Abuse Services Council and the Criminal Justice Service Board in 2020 and 2021, respectively. As Sheriff of Fauquier County, Mosier was named "Best Law Enforcement Officer" by the Warrenton Lifestyle magazine in 2018.

In 2022, Governor Glenn Youngkin nominated Mosier to serve as the 9th Virginia Secretary of Public Safety and Homeland Security, succeeding Brian Moran. During his tenure, he oversaw Virginia's response to the January 2022 North American Blizzard. He was credited by Youngkin as a leader of Virginia's "Operation Bold Blue Line," a multiagency effort to reduce gun violence and violent crime in Virginia, which the Governor's Office later claimed removed over $31 million worth of illicit narcotics off the street. The initiative was later criticized by the Virginia Democratic Party for not focusing enough on gun safety.

In 2023, Mosier resigned from Youngkin's cabinet and accepted a position at the Loudoun County Sheriff's Office, where he currently serves as Chief Deputy of the Administration & Corrections Bureau.
