= Leontine T. Kelly =

American bishop (1920–2012)

- Born: Leontine Turpeau; March 5, 1920; Washington, D.C.
- Died: June 28, 2012 (aged 92); Oakland, California
- Occupation: Bishop of the United Methodist Church
- Known for: First black woman to become a bishop in a major Christian denomination
- Spouses: Gloster Bryant Current; James David Kelly (m. 1956)
- Parent: David Turpeau
- Relatives: Anita Turpeau Anderson (sister); T. J. Anderson (nephew)

Leontine Turpeau Current Kelly (March 5, 1920 – June 28, 2012) was an American bishop of the United Methodist Church. She was the second woman elevated to the position of bishop within the United Methodist Church, and the first African American woman.

== Early life and personal life ==
Leontine Turpeau was born in Georgetown, Washington, D.C., on March 5, 1920. She was the seventh of eight children born to David D. Turpeau Senior and Ila Marshall Turpeau. The Turpeau family then moved to Cincinnati when Leontine was a young girl. Her father was a Methodist minister who later served four terms in the Ohio House of Representatives. Her mother was an outspoken advocate for women and Blacks and a founder of the Urban League of Cincinnati, Ohio. Her brother, D. Rossman Turpeau was an educator in Cincinnati, Ohio.

From 1938 to 1941, Turpeau attended West Virginia State College. In 1941, she left school to marry Gloster B. Current, who was then serving as the executive director of the NCAAP's Detroit branch. He later became a Methodist pastor. The couple had three children together before getting divorced by the mid-1950s. In 1956, Turpeau married James David Kelly, a United Methodist minister.

== Education ==
Kelly earned a B.A. degree from Virginia Union University (1960) and completed graduate work in economics, history and humanities at North Texas State University, the University of Cincinnati, and the College of William and Mary. She served as a public school teacher in Richmond and Northumberland County, Virginia, for eight years.

Kelly completed the Course of Study for Ordained Ministers in the Virginia Annual Conference of the U.M. Church by attending summer school at Wesley Theological Seminary (1970, 1971). She earned her M.Div. degree from Union Theological Seminary in Richmond, Virginia (1976).

== Ministry ==
Kelly became a Certified Lay Speaker in Virginia in the late-1960s. She then served the Galilee Church (1969–75). She was ordained a deacon by William R. Cannon in 1972 and an elder by W. Kenneth Goodson in 1977.

Kelly served on the staff of the Virginia Conference Council on Ministries (1975–77), directing social ministries. She then served as pastor of Asbury-Church Hill in Richmond, Virginia seven years before becoming Assistant General Secretary of the U.M. General Board of Discipleship with the portfolio of Evangelism.

Although a member of the Virginia Annual Conference in the Southeastern Jurisdiction, Kelly was elected to the episcopacy by the Western Jurisdictional Conference of the United Methodist Church in 1984. The election was held on July 19, during the annual General Conference of the United Methodist Church. She was only the second woman, and the first African American woman, to become a bishop in any major Christian denomination in the world. She was assigned to the San Francisco Episcopal Area, where she served until her retirement in 1988. Kelly also served on the U.M. General Board of Church and Society, as the President of the Western Jurisdictional College of Bishops, and on the executive committee of the Council of Bishops.

== Awards and honors ==
In 2000, Kelly was inducted into the National Women's Hall of Fame. She was the 2002 recipient of the Thomas Merton Award.

Kelly held honorary doctorates from Garrett-Evangelical Theological Seminary (1984), DePauw University (1989), Christian Theological Seminary (1989), Virginia Union University (1989), Nebraska Wesleyan University (also 1989), Bennett College (1991), Willamette University (1990) and Dillard University (1992).

In 2021, a stained glass window depicting Kelly was added to the Cathedral of the Rockies in Boise, Idaho. It replaced a window that depicted Robert E. Lee, Abraham Lincoln, and George Washington.

== Death ==
Kelly died on June 28, 2012, in Oakland, California.
