= Marshall (film) =

- Theatrical release poster
- Directed by: Reginald Hudlin
- Written by: Michael Koskoff; Jacob Koskoff
- Produced by: Paula Wagner; Reginald Hudlin; Jonathan Sanger
- Starring: Chadwick Boseman; Josh Gad; Kate Hudson; Dan Stevens; Sterling K. Brown; James Cromwell
- Cinematography: Newton Thomas Sigel
- Edited by: Tom McArdle
- Music by: Marcus Miller
- Production companies: Starlight Media; Chestnut Ridge Productions; Hudlin Entertainment
- Distributed by: Open Road Films
- Release dates: September 20, 2017 (Howard University); October 13, 2017 (United States)
- Running time: 118 minutes
- Country: United States
- Language: English
- Budget: $12 million
- Box office: $10.1 million

Marshall is a 2017 American biographical legal drama film directed by Reginald Hudlin and written by Michael and Jacob Koskoff. It stars Chadwick Boseman as Thurgood Marshall, the first African American Supreme Court Justice, and focuses on one of the first cases of his career, the State of Connecticut v. Joseph Spell. It also stars Josh Gad, Kate Hudson, Dan Stevens, Sterling K. Brown, and James Cromwell.

The project was announced in December 2015, along with Boseman's casting, and principal photography began in Los Angeles in mid-December 2015 and moved on to Buffalo and Niagara Falls, New York.

The film premiered at Howard University on September 20, 2017, and was released in the United States by Open Road Films on October 13, 2017. It received positive reviews from critics, with praise directed at Boseman's performance and with criticism aimed at the screenplay. It went on to gross $10 million against a $12 million budget.

At the 90th Academy Awards, it received a nomination for Best Original Song for "Stand Up for Something".

== Plot ==
In April 1941, Thurgood Marshall is an NAACP lawyer traveling the country defending people of color who are wrongly accused of crimes because of racial prejudice. Upon his return to his New York City office, he is sent to Bridgeport, Connecticut, to defend Joseph Spell, a chauffeur accused of rape by his white employer, Eleanor Strubing, in a case that has gripped the newspapers. In Bridgeport, insurance lawyer Sam Friedman is assigned by his brother to get Marshall admitted to the local bar, against his will. At the hearing, Judge Foster, a friend of the father of prosecutor Lorin Willis, agrees to admit Marshall, but forbids Marshall from speaking during the trial, forcing Friedman to be Spell's lead counsel. Marshall must guide Friedman through notes, such as when he advises Friedman to allow a woman of Southern white descent into the jury because of her assertive and questioning personality.

Spell swears to Marshall that he never had any sexual contact with Strubing and leads the lawyers to a patrolman who stopped Spell that night while he was driving Strubing's car. Marshall and Friedman investigate Strubing's story that Spell tied her up in the back seat of her car after raping her and drove to a bridge to throw her over. They wonder why Spell appeared to throw her over the calm side instead of the side with rapids. Spell is initially interested in a plea bargain offered by Willis, but Marshall talks him out of it. Later on at trial, though, a doctor testifies to finding pieces of skin underneath Strubing's fingernails, as well as bruises. Strubing herself testifies that she was tied in the back seat when the patrolman pulled Spell over. With this information, Marshall and Friedman confront Spell, who admits that he was lying about not having had sexual contact with Strubing.

At trial, Spell testifies that Strubing's husband inflicted the bruises through repeated acts of spousal abuse. That night, he went to ask Strubing for money to pay off a debt, finding a distraught Strubing wanting to have sex with him. Spell consented, and the two had several sexual encounters that night. Strubing then panicked about being found out and being pregnant. Spell tried to drive her to a doctor, but Strubing had to hide in the back seat when the patrolman questioned him. A hysterical Strubing forced Spell to stop by a bridge where she ran out and tried to kill herself. When Spell tried to stop her, she scratched him and jumped off the bridge, but survived and flagged down a motorist making up a desperate story about rape. When Willis asks why Spell didn't tell the truth to begin with, Spell talks about how black men get tortured and lynched in his native Louisiana for having sex with white women. Over Willis's objections, Judge Foster, who is shown to be horrified by Spell's revelation as are the members of the jury, allows Spell's statement to stand.

Before the verdict, Marshall has to leave for a case in Mississippi. A desperate Willis offers Spell a much lighter plea bargain, but Spell feels emboldened enough to turn it down. The night before Marshall leaves, he and Friedman prepare the closing statement that Friedman then delivers on his own. The Southern white woman has now become the jury forewoman, and she ultimately delivers a "not guilty" verdict. Soon after the verdict, the jury bursts into applause making Joseph Spell overjoyed. Friedman happily breaks the news over the phone to Marshall, who moves on to his next case. Closing credits note that Friedman went on to work in many civil rights cases, while Marshall himself has an illustrious career as the American Civil Rights Movement's principal legal strategist and the first African American Justice on the Supreme Court of the United States.

== Cast ==
- Chadwick Boseman as Thurgood Marshall, the future first African American Supreme Court Justice.
- Josh Gad as Sam Friedman, an insurance lawyer who teams with Marshall.
- Kate Hudson as Eleanor Strubing
- Dan Stevens as Lorin Willis
- James Cromwell as Judge Carl Foster
- Sterling K. Brown as Joseph Spell, the man accused of rape and attempted murder whom Marshall defends in court.
- Keesha Sharp as Vivien "Buster" Burey, Thurgood's wife
- John Magaro as Irwin Friedman
- Roger Guenveur Smith as Walter Francis White
- Ahna O'Reilly as Mrs. Eugenia Richmond
- Jeremy Bobb as John Strubing
- Derrick Baskin as Tad Lancaster
- Jeffrey DeMunn as Dr. Maurice Sayer
- Andra Day as Andra
- Sophia Bush as Jennifer (the woman at the bar)
- Jussie Smollett as Langston Hughes
- Rozonda 'Chilli' Thomas as Zora Neale Hurston
- Barrett Doss as Bertha Lancaster
- Zanete Shadwick as Irene Lancaster
- Brendan Burke as Captain Burke
- Marina Squerciati as Stella Friedman

=== Cameos ===
In the final scene, civil rights attorney Benjamin Crump appears as civil rights attorney Z. Alexander Looby. He is accompanied by Tracy Martin and Sybrina Fulton, the parents of Trayvon Martin, who appear as the parents of the 14-year-old Mississippi boy Thurgood Marshall is there to represent.

== Production ==
Principal photography began in Los Angeles in mid-December 2015, before moving to Buffalo in early 2016, including shoots at Buffalo City Hall, the Buffalo Central Terminal, Daemen College, Orchard Park, and Niagara Falls. Reginald Hudlin directed the film from Michael Koskoff and his son Jacob Koskoff's script. Chinese company Super Hero Films financed the film, which was produced by Paula Wagner through her Chestnut Ridge Productions, along with Hudlin and Jonathan Sanger.

== Release ==
The film had its world premiere at Howard University on September 20, 2017, and was released in the United States on October 13, 2017.

=== Box office ===
In the United States and Canada, Marshall was released alongside Happy Death Day, The Foreigner, and Professor Marston and the Wonder Women, and was expected to gross $3–4 million from 821 theaters in its opening weekend. It ended up making $3 million, finishing 11th at the box office.

=== Critical response ===
On review aggregation website Rotten Tomatoes, the film has an approval rating of 80% based on 144 reviews, with an average rating of 6.6/10. The site's critical consensus reads, "Marshall takes an illuminating, well-acted look at its real-life subject's early career that also delivers as an entertainingly old-fashioned courtroom drama." On Metacritic, the film has a weighted average score 66 out of 100, based on reviews from 34 critics, indicating "generally favorable reviews".

Peter DeBruge of Variety called the film "a compelling courtroom drama". Writing for Rolling Stone, Peter Travers praised Boseman's performance, giving the film three stars out of five and saying, "Charged by Boseman's dramatic lightning, Marshall gives us an electrifying glimpse of a great man in the making."

Manohla Dargis for The New York Times praised the film for choosing a specific case as a way of exploring Marshall's life, but is critical of the simplified characterizations and the efforts made throughout to put the audience at ease.

In Vulture, Angelica Jade Bastién also criticizes the lack of character depth, particularly regarding Marshall. Bastién mentions the scene in which Marshall drinks from a whites-only water fountain, stating that for her it mainly underlined "how little effort the film makes in understanding why Marshall makes such bold decisions on a deeper level, and who he was beyond this arrogant, quick-witted man it presents." One aspect that is 'flattened out' in this film is the colorism of U.S. society, which resulted in light-skinned Thurgood Marshall having much different life experiences than if he had had the skin tone of Chadwick Boseman.

=== Accolades ===
"Stand Up for Something" was nominated for the Academy Award for Best Original Song, the Critics' Choice Movie Award for Best Song, and the Satellite Award for Best Original Song; it won the latter prize, while losing the first two to "Remember Me" from Coco.

== See also ==
- List of black films of the 2010s
