= Anita Turpeau Anderson =

American pianist

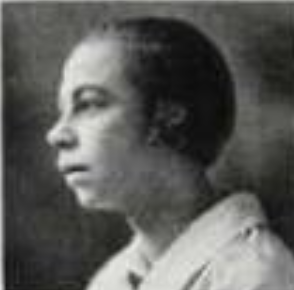
- Anita Turpeau Anderson, from the 1925 yearbook of Howard University
- Born: Anita Belle Turpeau; July 4, 1903; Hudson, New York
- Died: June 27, 1996 (aged 92)
- Occupations: Educator, clubwoman
- Spouse: Thomas Jefferson Anderson (m. 1927)
- Children: 3, including T. J. Anderson
- Father: David Turpeau
- Relatives: Leontine T. Kelly (sister)

Anita Belle Turpeau Anderson (née Turpeau; July 4, 1903 – June 27, 1996) was an American educator and clubwoman.

== Early life and education ==
Anita Belle Turpeau was born in Hudson, New York, the daughter of David Dewitt Turpeau and Ila Marshall Turpeau. Her father was a Methodist minister who was elected to the Ohio House of Representatives. Her mother was active in community groups including the Urban League, the YWCA, and the NAACP. Her younger sister Leontine T. Kelly was the first Black woman to become a bishop in the United Methodist Church.

Turpeau attended Dunbar High School, and graduated from Howard University in 1925. In 1937 she earned one the first Master of Arts degrees in religious education at Howard. She was the first woman to join the Howard University debate team, the first woman editor-in-chief of The Hilltop, Howard's campus newspaper, president of the Howard Players and president of the Pestalozzi-Froebel Society. She was a member of Zeta Phi Beta, and wrote the lyrics of sorority's official song. Later, she earned a law degree from LaSalle University.

== Career ==
Anderson was a school principal in Arkansas for a year after college, then joined the faculty at James Adams Community School in Coatesville, Pennsylvania. After marriage, she was director of the Wesley Foundation at Howard University, and served on the Board of Public Welfare in the District of Columbia.

She was a member of the executive board of the National Council of Negro Women, and active in Girl Scouting and YWCA in the District of Columbia. She was chair of the music department of the Pennsylvania State Federation of Negro Women's Clubs. She was a Washington, D.C. delegate to the International Women's Year events in 1977.

== Personal life and legacy ==
Turpeau married fellow educator Thomas Jefferson Anderson on April 9, 1979. They had three children, including composer T. J. Anderson. She died in 1996, aged 92.

T. J. Anderson published Words My Mother Taught Me, a musical setting for soprano and piano, incorporating lyrics written by Anita Turpeau Anderson.
