= Terry Cole (law enforcement official) =

American law enforcement officer

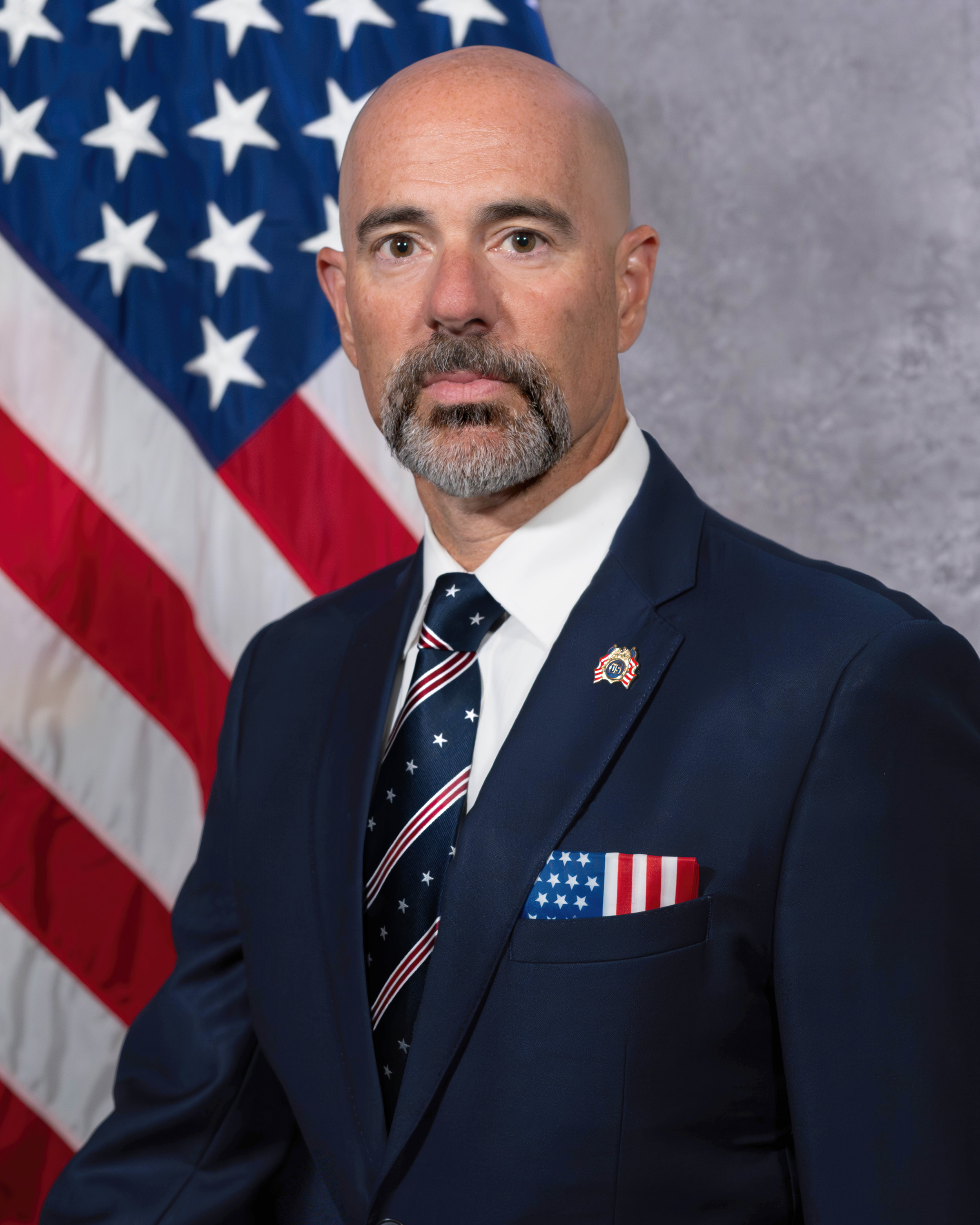
- Official portrait, 2025

12th Administrator of the Drug Enforcement Administration
- Incumbent
- Assumed office July 24, 2025
- President: Donald Trump
- Preceded by: Anne Milgram

Virginia Secretary of Public Safety
- In office June 1, 2023 – July 24, 2025
- Appointed by: Glenn Youngkin
- Preceded by: Bob Mosier
- Succeeded by: Marcus Anderson

Personal details
- Born: August 17, 1969 (age 57)
- Party: Republican
- Children: 4
- Education: Rochester Institute of Technology (BA); University of Virginia; University of Notre Dame
- Profession: Law enforcement official

Terrance Christopher Cole (born August 17, 1969) is an American law enforcement official serving as the 12th administrator of the Drug Enforcement Administration since 2025. He previously served as the Virginia secretary of public safety from 2023 to 2025 under Governor Glenn Youngkin.

== Early life and education ==
Cole grew up in Corning, NY, and graduated from Corning East High School in 1987. Cole graduated from the Rochester Institute of Technology with a Bachelor of Arts in criminal justice. He also earned certificates in leadership from the University of Virginia and the Mendoza College of Business at the University of Notre Dame.

== Career ==
Cole served as a Blue and Gold Officer for the United States Naval Academy. He later joined the U.S. Drug Enforcement Administration (DEA) where he worked for 22 years, including service in various states as well as working on foreign missions in Colombia, Afghanistan, Mexico and the Middle East. He held positions including Chief of Staff and Executive Officer for the DEA Chief of Global Operations, at the DEA/Department of Justice Special Operations Division, as the DEA representative to the National Security Council, and as assistant regional director in Mexico City. He graduated from the FBI National Academy, Session 282. He retired in 2020, while holding the title of acting regional director of Mexico, Canada and Central America.

After Cole's service with the DEA, he worked in the private sector, being the senior vice president for Aperia Solutions. In May 2023, he was named by Governor Youngkin as the next Virginia Secretary of Public Safety, and he assumed office on June 1, succeeding Bob Mosier.

On February 11, 2025, Cole was named by President Donald Trump as the nominee for Administrator of the DEA.

== Personal life ==
Cole is married and has four children.

Preceded by Anne Milgram	12th Administrator of the Drug Enforcement Administration; 2025–present	Incumbent
