= Thurgood Marshall =

US Supreme Court justice from 1967 to 1991

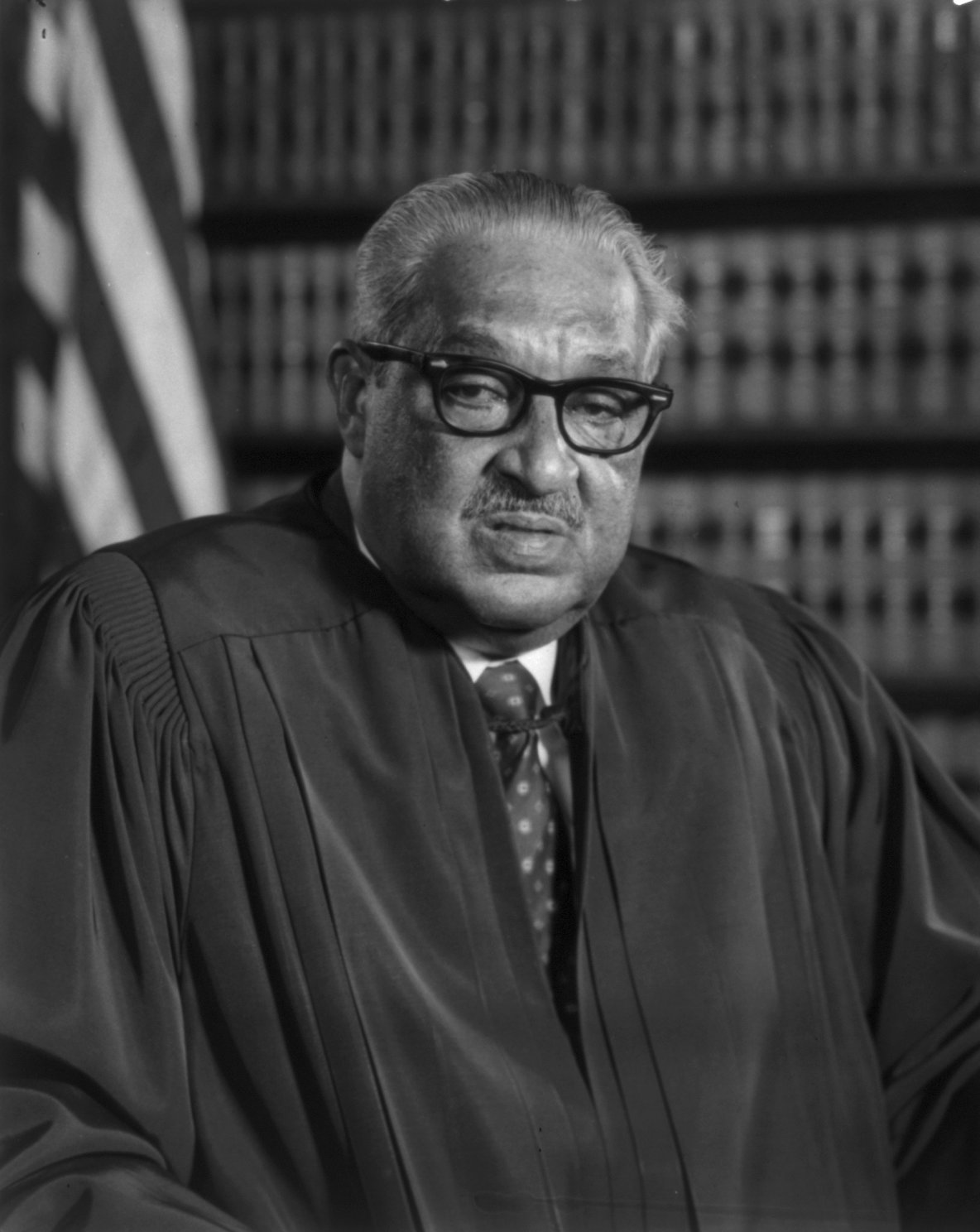
- Official portrait, 1976

Associate Justice of the Supreme Court of the United States
- In office October 2, 1967 – October 1, 1991
- Nominated by: Lyndon B. Johnson
- Preceded by: Tom C. Clark
- Succeeded by: Clarence Thomas

32nd Solicitor General of the United States
- In office August 23, 1965 – August 30, 1967
- President: Lyndon B. Johnson
- Preceded by: Archibald Cox
- Succeeded by: Erwin Griswold

Judge of the United States Court of Appeals for the Second Circuit
- In office October 5, 1961 – August 23, 1965
- Nominated by: John F. Kennedy
- Preceded by: Seat established
- Succeeded by: Wilfred Feinberg

Personal details
- Born: Thoroughgood Marshall; July 2, 1908 Baltimore, Maryland, U.S.
- Died: January 24, 1993 (aged 84) Bethesda, Maryland, U.S.
- Resting place: Arlington National Cemetery
- Party: Democratic
- Spouses: Vivian Burey (m. 1929; died 1955); Cecilia Suyat (m. 1955)
- Children: Thurgood Jr.; John
- Education: Lincoln University, Pennsylvania (BA); Howard University (LLB)
- Occupation: Civil rights lawyer; jurist
- Known for: First African-American Supreme Court justice
- Marshall's voice Marshall delivering the majority opinion in Bounds v. Smith. Recorded April 27, 1977

Thoroughgood "Thurgood" Marshall (July 2, 1908 – January 24, 1993) was an American lawyer who served as an associate justice of the Supreme Court of the United States from 1967 until 1991. He was the Supreme Court's first African-American justice. Before his judicial service, he was an attorney who fought for civil rights, leading the NAACP Legal Defense and Educational Fund. Marshall was a prominent figure in the movement to end racial segregation in American public schools. He won 29 of the 32 civil rights cases he argued before the Supreme Court, culminating in the Court's landmark 1954 decision in Brown v. Board of Education, which rejected the separate but equal doctrine and held segregation in public education to be unconstitutional. President Lyndon B. Johnson appointed Marshall to the Supreme Court in 1967. A staunch liberal, he frequently dissented as the Court became increasingly conservative.

Born in Baltimore, Maryland, Marshall attended Lincoln University and the Howard University School of Law. At Howard, he was mentored by Charles Hamilton Houston, who taught his students to be "social engineers" willing to use the law to fight for civil rights. Marshall opened a law practice in Baltimore but soon joined Houston at the NAACP in New York. They worked together on the segregation case of Missouri ex rel. Gaines v. Canada; after Houston returned to Washington, Marshall took his place as special counsel of the NAACP, and he became director-counsel of the newly formed NAACP Legal Defense and Educational Fund. He participated in numerous landmark Supreme Court cases involving civil rights, including Smith v. Allwright, Morgan v. Virginia, Shelley v. Kraemer, McLaurin v. Oklahoma State Regents, Sweatt v. Painter, Brown, and Cooper v. Aaron. His approach to desegregation cases emphasized the use of sociological data to show that segregation was inherently unequal.

In 1961, President John F. Kennedy appointed Marshall to the U.S. Court of Appeals for the Second Circuit, where he favored a broad interpretation of constitutional protections. Four years later, Johnson appointed him as the U.S. solicitor general. In 1967, Johnson nominated Marshall to replace Justice Tom C. Clark on the Supreme Court; despite opposition from Southern senators, he was confirmed by a 69–11 vote. He was often in the majority during the consistently liberal Warren Court period, but after appointments by President Richard Nixon made the Court more conservative, Marshall frequently found himself in dissent. His closest ally on the Court was Justice William J. Brennan Jr., and the two voted the same way in most cases.

One of Marshall's contributions to constitutional doctrine, the "sliding-scale" approach to the Equal Protection Clause, called on courts to apply a flexible balancing test instead of a more rigid tier-based analysis. He fervently opposed the death penalty, which in his view constituted cruel and unusual punishment; he and Brennan dissented in more than 1,400 cases in which the majority refused to review a death sentence. He favored a robust interpretation of the First Amendment in decisions such as Stanley v. Georgia, and he supported abortion rights in Roe v. Wade and other cases. Marshall retired from the Supreme Court in 1991 and was replaced by Clarence Thomas. He died in 1993.

== Early life and education ==
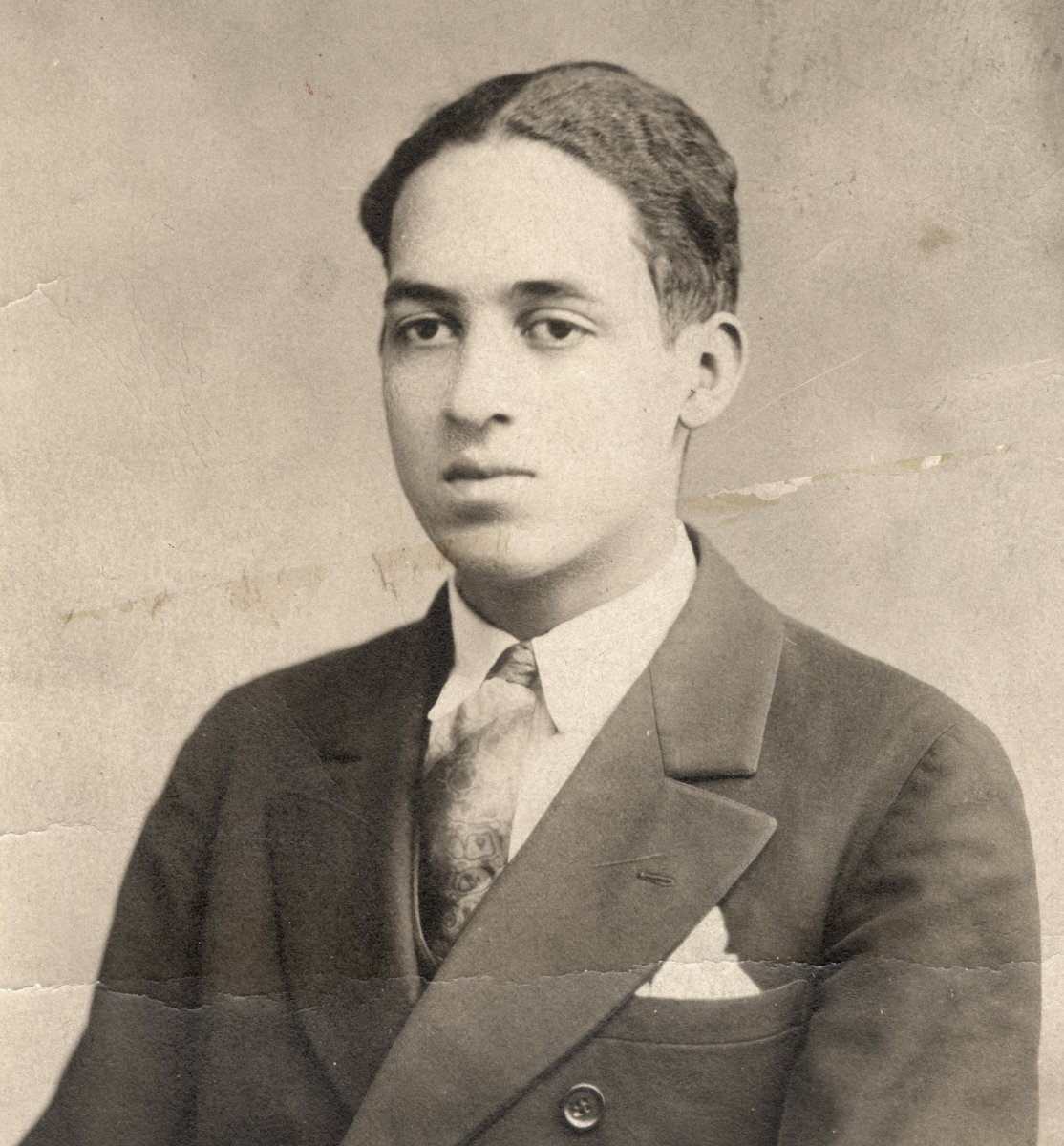
Marshall in the Colored High and Training School yearbook, 1925

Thurgood (Note: Marshall was originally named "Thoroughgood" (his paternal grandfather's name), but he changed it to the briefer "Thurgood" when he was in the second grade.) Marshall was born on July 2, 1908, in Baltimore, Maryland, to Norma and William Canfield Marshall. His father held various jobs as a waiter in hotels, in clubs, and on railroad cars, and his mother was an elementary school teacher. The family moved to New York City in search of better employment opportunities not long after Thurgood's birth; they returned to Baltimore when he was six years old. He was an energetic and boisterous child who frequently found himself in trouble. Following legal cases was one of William's hobbies, and Thurgood oftentimes went to court with him to observe the proceedings. Marshall later said that his father "never told me to become a lawyer, but he turned me into one ... He taught me how to argue, challenged my logic on every point, by making me prove every statement I made, even if we were discussing the weather."

Marshall attended the Colored High and Training School (later Frederick Douglass High School) in Baltimore, graduating in 1925 with honors. He then enrolled at Lincoln University in Chester County, Pennsylvania, the oldest college for African Americans in the United States. The mischievous Marshall was suspended for two weeks in the wake of a hazing incident, but he earned good grades in his classes and led the school's debating team to numerous victories. His classmates included the poet Langston Hughes. Upon his graduation with honors in 1930 with a bachelor's degree in American literature and philosophy, Marshall—being unable to attend the all-white University of Maryland Law School—applied to Howard University School of Law in Washington, D.C., and was admitted. At Howard, he was mentored by Charles Hamilton Houston, who taught his students to be "social engineers" willing to use the law as a vehicle to fight for civil rights. Marshall graduated in June 1933 ranked first in his class, and he passed the Maryland bar examination later that year.

== Legal career ==
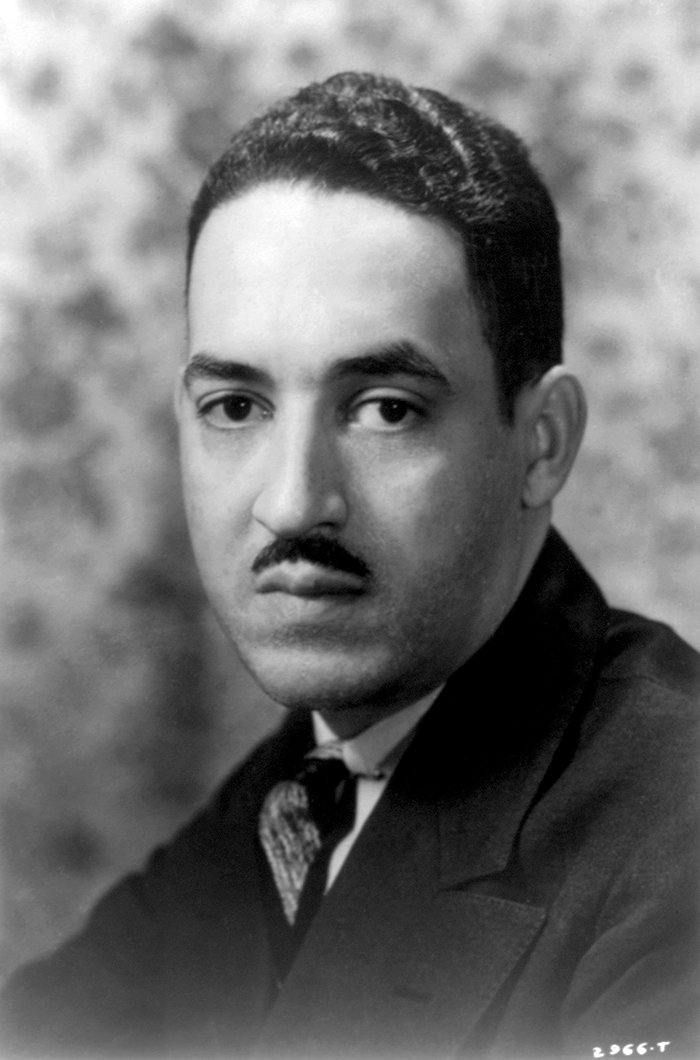
Marshall c. 1935–1940

Marshall started a law practice in Baltimore, but it was not financially successful, partially because he spent much of his time working for the benefit of the community. He volunteered with the Baltimore branch of the National Association for the Advancement of Colored Persons (NAACP). In 1935, Marshall and Houston brought suit against the University of Maryland on behalf of Donald Gaines Murray, an African American whose application to the university's law school had been rejected on account of his race. In that case—Murray v. Pearson—Judge Eugene O'Dunne ordered that Murray be admitted, and the Maryland Court of Appeals affirmed, holding that it violated equal protection to admit white students to the law school while keeping blacks from being educated in-state. The decision was never appealed to the Supreme Court of the United States and therefore did not apply nationwide, but it pleased Marshall, who later said that he had filed the lawsuit "to get even with the bastards" who had kept him from attending the school himself.

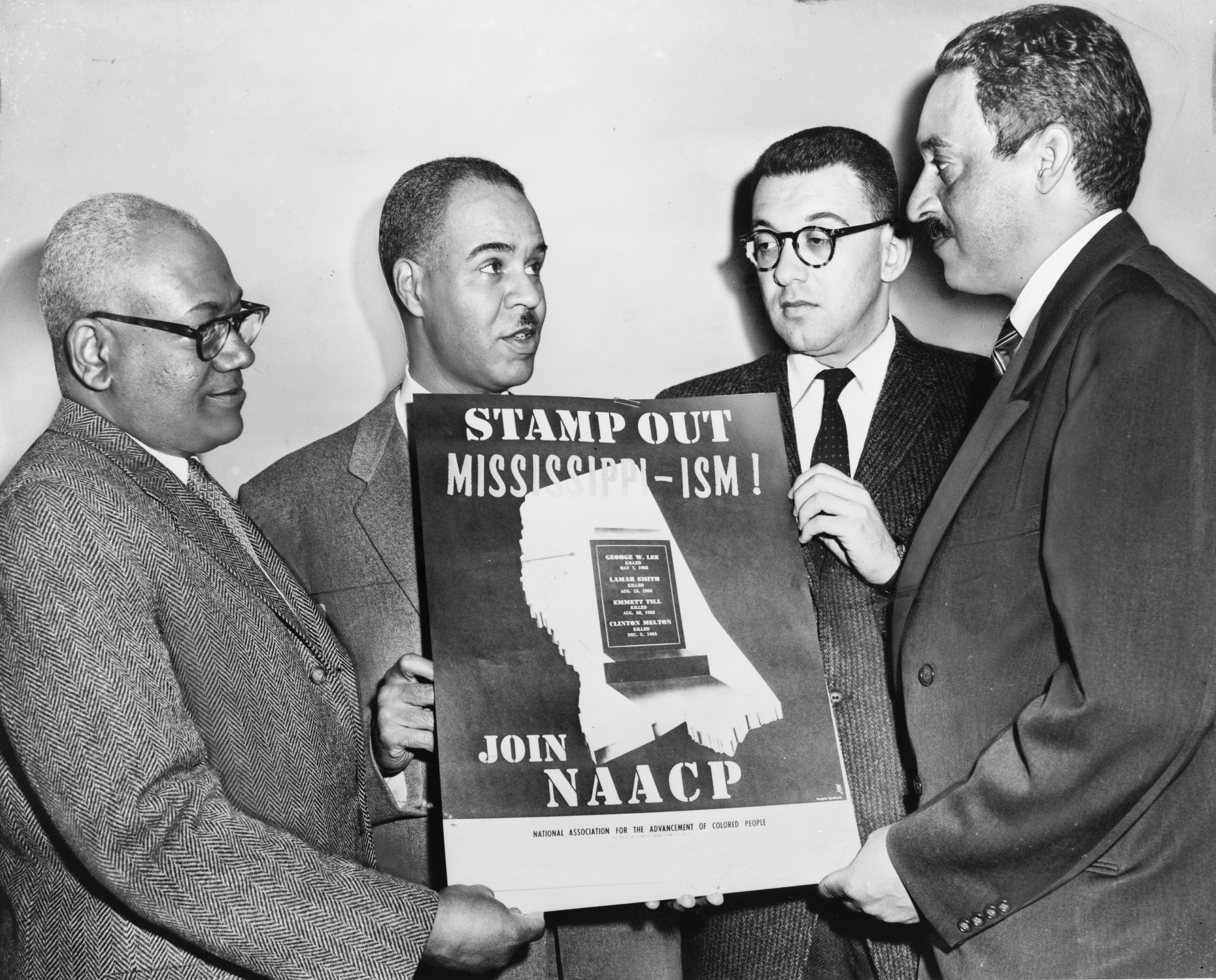
NAACP leaders Henry L. Moon, Roy Wilkins, Herbert Hill, and Thurgood Marshall in 1956

In 1936, Marshall joined Houston, who had been appointed as the NAACP's special counsel, in New York City, serving as his assistant. They worked together on the landmark case of Missouri ex rel. Gaines v. Canada (1938). When Lloyd Lionel Gaines's application to the University of Missouri's law school was rejected on account of his race, he filed suit, arguing that his equal-protection rights had been violated because he had not been provided with a legal education substantially equivalent to that which white students received. After Missouri courts rejected Gaines's claims, Houston—joined by Marshall, who helped to prepare the brief—sought review in the U.S. Supreme Court. They did not challenge the Court's decision in Plessy v. Ferguson (1896), which had accepted the "separate but equal" doctrine; instead, they argued that Gaines had been denied an equal education. In an opinion by Chief Justice Charles Evans Hughes, the Court held that if Missouri gave whites the opportunity to attend law school in-state, it was required to do the same for blacks.

Houston returned to Washington in 1938, and Marshall assumed his position as special counsel the following year. He also became the director-counsel of the NAACP Legal Defense and Educational Fund Inc. (the Inc Fund), which had been established as a separate organization for tax purposes. In addition to litigating cases and arguing matters before the Supreme Court, he was responsible for raising money, managing the Inc Fund, and conducting public-relations work. Marshall litigated a number of cases involving unequal salaries for African Americans, winning nearly all of them; by 1945, he had ended salary disparities in major Southern cities and earned a reputation as a prominent figure in the civil rights movement. He also defended individuals who had been charged with crimes before both trial courts and the Supreme Court. Of the thirty-two civil rights cases that Marshall argued before the Supreme Court, he won twenty-nine. He and W. J. Durham wrote the brief in Smith v. Allwright (1944), in which the Court ruled the white primary unconstitutional, and he successfully argued both Morgan v. Virginia (1946), involving segregation on interstate buses, and a companion case to Shelley v. Kraemer (1948), involving racially restrictive covenants.

From 1939 to 1947, Marshall was a member of the Board of Directors of the American Civil Liberties Union. During that period, he aligned with the faction which favored a more absolutist defense of civil liberties. Most notably, unlike the majority of the Board, he was consistent in his opposition to Roosevelt's Executive Order 9066, which put Japanese Americans into concentration camps. Also, in contrast to most of the Board, Marshall charged that the prosecution of thirty-two right wing opponents of Roosevelt's pre-war foreign policy in the Sedition Trial of 1944 violated the First Amendment.

In the years after 1945, Marshall resumed his offensive against racial segregation in schools. Together with his Inc Fund colleagues, he devised a strategy that emphasized the inherent educational disparities caused by segregation rather than the physical differences between the schools provided for blacks and whites. The Court ruled in Marshall's favor in Sipuel v. Board of Regents of the University of Oklahoma (1948), ordering that Oklahoma provide Ada Lois Sipuel with a legal education, although the justices declined to order that she be admitted to the state's law school for whites. In 1950, Marshall brought two cases involving education to the Court: McLaurin v. Oklahoma State Regents, which was George W. McLaurin's challenge to unequal treatment at the University of Oklahoma's graduate school, and Sweatt v. Painter, which was Heman Sweatt's challenge to his being required to attend a blacks-only law school in Texas. The Supreme Court ruled in favor of both McLaurin and Sweatt on the same day; although the justices did not overrule Plessy and the separate but equal doctrine, they rejected discrimination against African-American students and the provisions of schools for blacks that were inferior to those provided for whites.

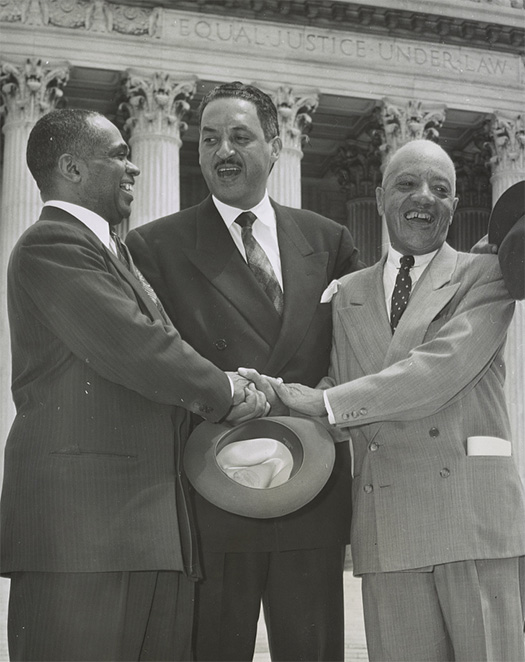
Marshall (center), George Edward Chalmer Hayes, and James Nabrit congratulate one another after the Supreme Court's decision in Brown v. Board of Education.

Marshall next turned to the issue of segregation in primary and secondary schools. The NAACP brought suit to challenge segregated schools in Delaware, the District of Columbia, Kansas, South Carolina, and Virginia, arguing both that there were disparities between the physical facilities provided for blacks and whites and that segregation was inherently harmful to African-American children. Marshall helped to try the South Carolina case. He called numerous social scientists and other expert witnesses to testify regarding the harms of segregation; these included the psychology professor Ken Clark, who testified that segregation in schools caused self-hatred among African-American students and inflicted damage that was "likely to endure as long as the conditions of segregation exist". The five cases eventually reached the Supreme Court and were argued in December 1952. In contrast to the oratorical rhetoric of his adversary—John W. Davis, a former solicitor general and presidential candidate—Marshall spoke plainly and conversationally. He stated that the only possible justification for segregation "is an inherent determination that the people who were formerly in slavery, regardless of anything else, shall be kept as near that stage as possible. And now is the time, we submit, that this Court should make clear that that is not what our Constitution stands for." On May 17, 1954, after internal disagreements and a 1953 reargument, the Supreme Court handed down its unanimous decision in Brown v. Board of Education, holding in an opinion by Chief Justice Earl Warren that: "in the field of public education the doctrine of 'separate but equal' has no place. Separate educational facilities are inherently unequal." When Marshall heard Warren read those words, he later said, "I was so happy I was numb".

The Court in Brown ordered additional arguments on the proper remedy for the constitutional violation that it had identified; in Brown II, decided in 1955, the justices ordered that desegregation proceed "with all deliberate speed". Their refusal to set a concrete deadline came as a disappointment to Marshall, who had argued for total integration to be completed by September 1956. In the years following the Court's decision, Marshall coordinated challenges to Virginia's "massive resistance" to Brown, and he returned to the Court to successfully argue Cooper v. Aaron (1958), involving Little Rock's attempt to delay integration. Marshall, who according to the legal scholar and Marshall biographer Mark Tushnet "gradually became a civil rights leader more than a civil rights lawyer", spent substantial amounts of time giving speeches and fundraising; in 1960, he accepted an invitation from Tom Mboya to help draft Kenya's constitution. By that year, Tushnet writes, he had become "the country's most prominent Supreme Court advocate".

== Court of Appeals ==
President John F. Kennedy, who according to Tushnet "wanted to demonstrate his commitment to the interests of African Americans without incurring enormous political costs", nominated Marshall to be a judge of the United States Court of Appeals for the Second Circuit on September 23, 1961. The Second Circuit, which spanned New York, Vermont, and Connecticut, was at the time the nation's prominent appellate court. When Congress adjourned, Kennedy gave Marshall a recess appointment, and he took the oath of office on October 23.

Even after his recess appointment, Southern senators continued to delay Marshall's full confirmation for more than eight months. A subcommittee of the Senate Judiciary Committee postponed his hearing several times, leading Senator Kenneth Keating, a New York Republican, to charge that the three-member subcommittee, which included two pro-segregation Southern Democrats, was biased against Marshall and engaged in unjustifiable delay. The subcommittee held several hearings between May and August 1962; Marshall faced harsh questioning from the Southerners over what the scholar Howard Ball described as "marginal issues at best". After further delays from the subcommittee, the full Judiciary Committee bypassed it and, by an 11–4 vote on September 7, endorsed Marshall's nomination. Following five hours of floor debate, the full Senate confirmed him by a 56–14 vote on September 11, 1962.

On the Second Circuit, Marshall authored 98 majority opinions, none of which were reversed by the Supreme Court, as well as 8 concurrences and 12 dissents. He dissented when a majority held in the Fourth Amendment case of United States ex rel. Angelet v. Fay (1964) that the Supreme Court's 1961 decision in Mapp v. Ohio (which held that the exclusionary rule applied to the states) did not apply retroactively, writing that the judiciary was "not free to circumscribe the application of a declared constitutional right". In United States v. Wilkins (1964), he concluded that the Fifth Amendment's protection against double jeopardy applied to the states; in People of the State of New York v. Galamison (1965), he dissented from a ruling upholding the convictions of civil rights protesters at the New York World's Fair. Marshall's dissents indicated that he favored broader interpretations of constitutional protections than did his colleagues.

== Solicitor General ==
Marshall's nomination to the office of Solicitor General was widely viewed as a stepping stone to a Supreme Court appointment. Johnson pressured Southern senators not to obstruct Marshall's confirmation, and a hearing before a Senate subcommittee lasted only fifteen minutes; the full Senate confirmed him on August 11, 1965. As Solicitor General, Marshall won fourteen of the nineteen Supreme Court cases he argued. He later characterized the position as "the most effective job" and "maybe the best" job he ever had. Marshall argued in Harper v. Virginia State Board of Elections (1966) that conditioning the ability to vote on the payment of a poll tax was unlawful; in a companion case to Miranda v. Arizona (1966), he unsuccessfully maintained on behalf of the government that federal agents were not always required to inform arrested individuals of their rights. He defended the constitutionality of the Voting Rights Act of 1965 in South Carolina v. Katzenbach (1966) and Katzenbach v. Morgan (1966), winning both cases.

== Supreme Court nomination ==
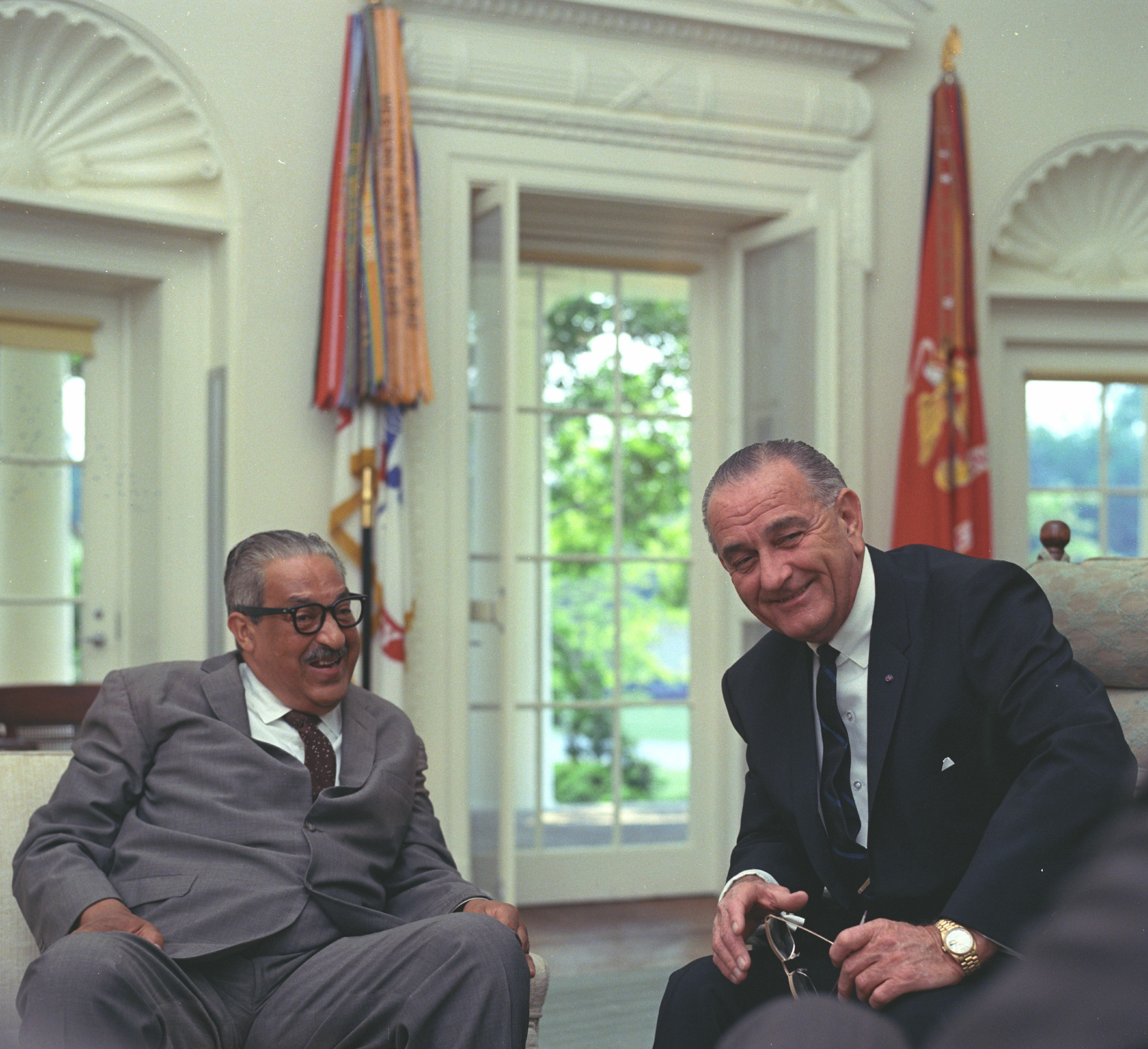
Marshall meeting with President Lyndon B. Johnson in the Oval Office of the White House on the day that Marshall was nominated by Johnson to serve on the Supreme Court

President Johnson's remarks upon nominating Marshall to the Supreme Court, June 13, 1967

1967 Universal Newsreel footage covering Marshall's first day on the Supreme Court

In February 1967, Johnson nominated Ramsey Clark to be Attorney General. The nominee's father was Tom C. Clark, an associate justice of the Supreme Court of the United States. Fearing that his son's appointment would create substantial conflicts of interest for him, the elder Clark announced his resignation from the Court. For Johnson, who had long desired to nominate a non-white justice, the choice of a nominee to fill the ensuing vacancy "was as easy as it was obvious", according to the scholar Henry J. Abraham. Although the President briefly considered selecting William H. Hastie (an African-American appellate judge from Philadelphia) or a female candidate, he decided to choose Marshall. Johnson announced the nomination in the White House Rose Garden on June 13, declaring that Marshall "deserves the appointment ... I believe that it is the right thing to do, the right time to do it, the right man and the right place."

The public received the nomination favorably, and Marshall was praised by prominent senators from both parties. The Senate Judiciary Committee held hearings for five days in July. Marshall faced harsh criticism from such senators as Mississippi's James O. Eastland, North Carolina's Sam Ervin Jr., Arkansas's John McClellan, and South Carolina's Strom Thurmond, all of whom opposed the nominee's liberal jurisprudence. In what Time magazine characterized as a "Yahoo-type hazing", Thurmond asked Marshall over sixty questions about various minor aspects of the history of certain constitutional provisions. By an 11–5 vote on August 3, the committee recommended that Marshall be confirmed. On August 30, after six hours of debate, senators voted 69–11 (Note: Thirty-two Republicans and thirty-seven Democrats voted to confirm Marshall; one Republican (Thurmond) and ten Southern Democrats voted against him. On the urging of Johnson, twenty Southerners did not cast a vote.) to confirm Marshall to the Supreme Court. He took the constitutional oath of office on October 2, 1967, becoming the first African American to serve as a justice of the Supreme Court of the United States.

== Supreme Court ==
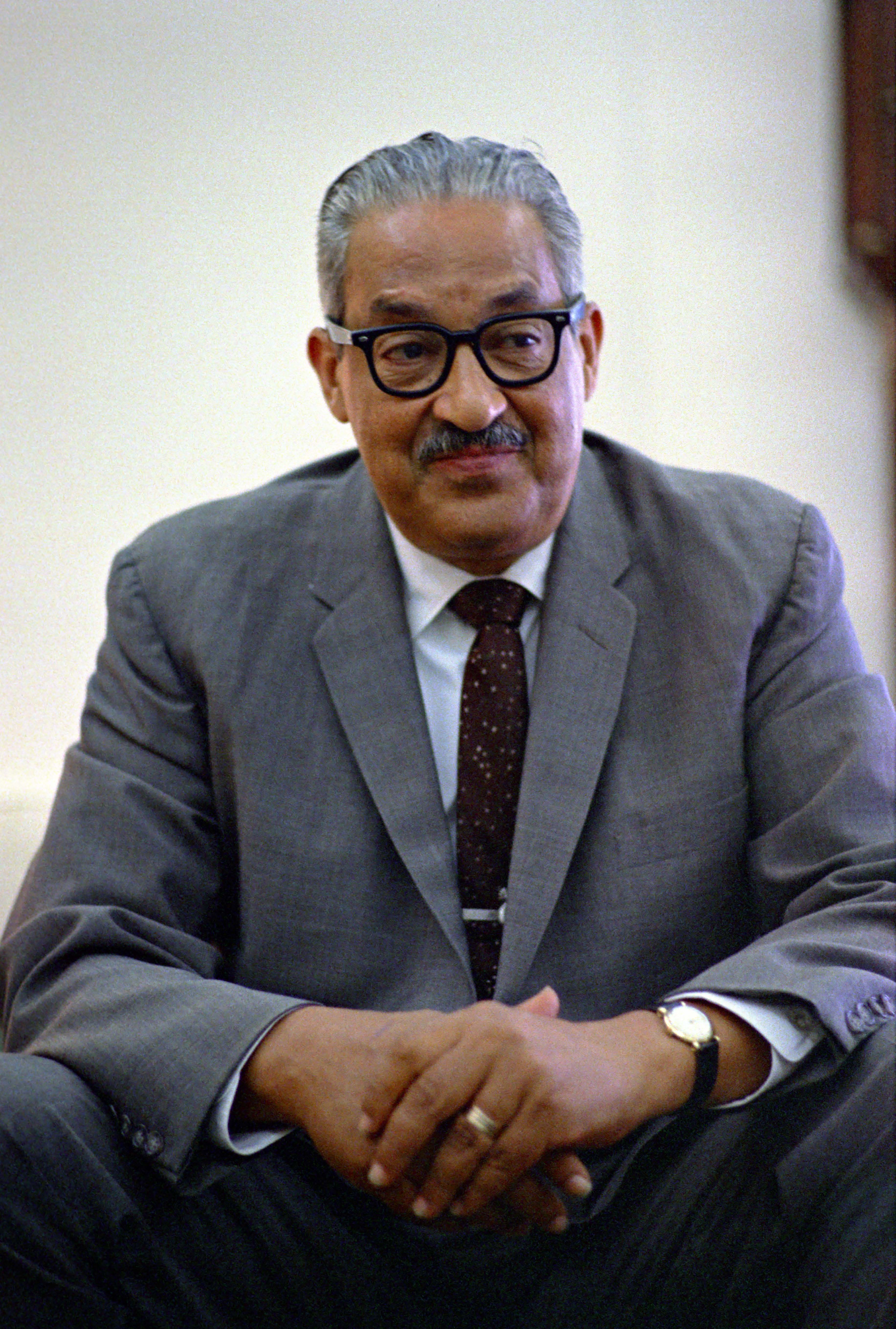
Marshall at the White House, June 13, 1967

Marshall remained on the Supreme Court for nearly twenty-four years, serving until his retirement in 1991. The Court to which he was appointed—the Warren Court—had a consistent liberal majority, and Marshall's jurisprudence was similar to that of its leaders, Chief Justice Warren and Justice William J. Brennan Jr. Although he wrote few major opinions during this period due to his lack of seniority, he was typically in the majority. As a result of four Supreme Court appointments by President Richard Nixon, however, the liberal coalition vanished. The Court under Chief Justice Warren Burger (the Burger Court) was not as conservative as some observers had anticipated, but the task of constructing liberal majorities case-by-case was left primarily to Brennan; Marshall's most consequential contributions to constitutional law came in dissent. The justice left much of his work to his law clerks, preferring to determine the outcome of the case and then allow the clerks to draft the opinion themselves. He took umbrage at frequent claims that he did no work and spent his time watching daytime soap operas; according to Tushnet, who clerked for Marshall, the idea that he "was a lazy Justice uninterested in the Court's work ... is wrong and perhaps racist". Marshall's closest colleague and friend on the Court was Brennan, and the two justices agreed so often that their clerks privately referred to them as "Justice Brennanmarshall". (Note: In non-unanimous cases decided by an eight- or nine-justice court, Marshall and Brennan voted the same way 91.67% of the time during the Warren Court, 87.33% of the time during the Burger Court, and 94.86% of the time during the Rehnquist Court.) He also had a high regard for Warren, whom he described as "probably the greatest Chief Justice who ever lived".

Marshall consistently sided with the Supreme Court's liberal bloc. According to the scholar William J. Daniels: "His approach to justice was Warren Court–style legal realism ... In his dissenting opinions he emphasized individual rights, fundamental fairness, equal opportunity and protection under the law, the supremacy of the Constitution as the embodiment of rights and privileges, and the Supreme Court's responsibility to play a significant role in giving meaning to the notion of constitutional rights." Marshall's jurisprudence was pragmatic and relied on his real-world experience as a lawyer and as an African American. He disagreed with the notion (favored by some of his conservative colleagues) that the Constitution should be interpreted according to the Founders' original understandings; in a 1987 speech commemorating the Constitution's bicentennial, he said:

... I do not believe that the meaning of the Constitution was forever "fixed" at the Philadelphia Convention. Nor do I find the wisdom, foresight, and sense of justice exhibited by the framers particularly profound. To the contrary, the government they devised was defective from the start, requiring several amendments, a civil war, and momentous social transformation to attain the system of constitutional government, and its respect for the individual freedoms and human rights, that we hold as fundamental today ... "We the People" no longer enslave, but the credit does not belong to the framers. It belongs to those who refused to acquiesce in outdated notions of "liberty", "justice", and "equality", and who strived to better them ... I plan to celebrate the bicentennial of the Constitution as a living document, including the Bill of Rights and the other amendments protecting individual freedoms and human rights.

=== Equal protection and civil rights ===
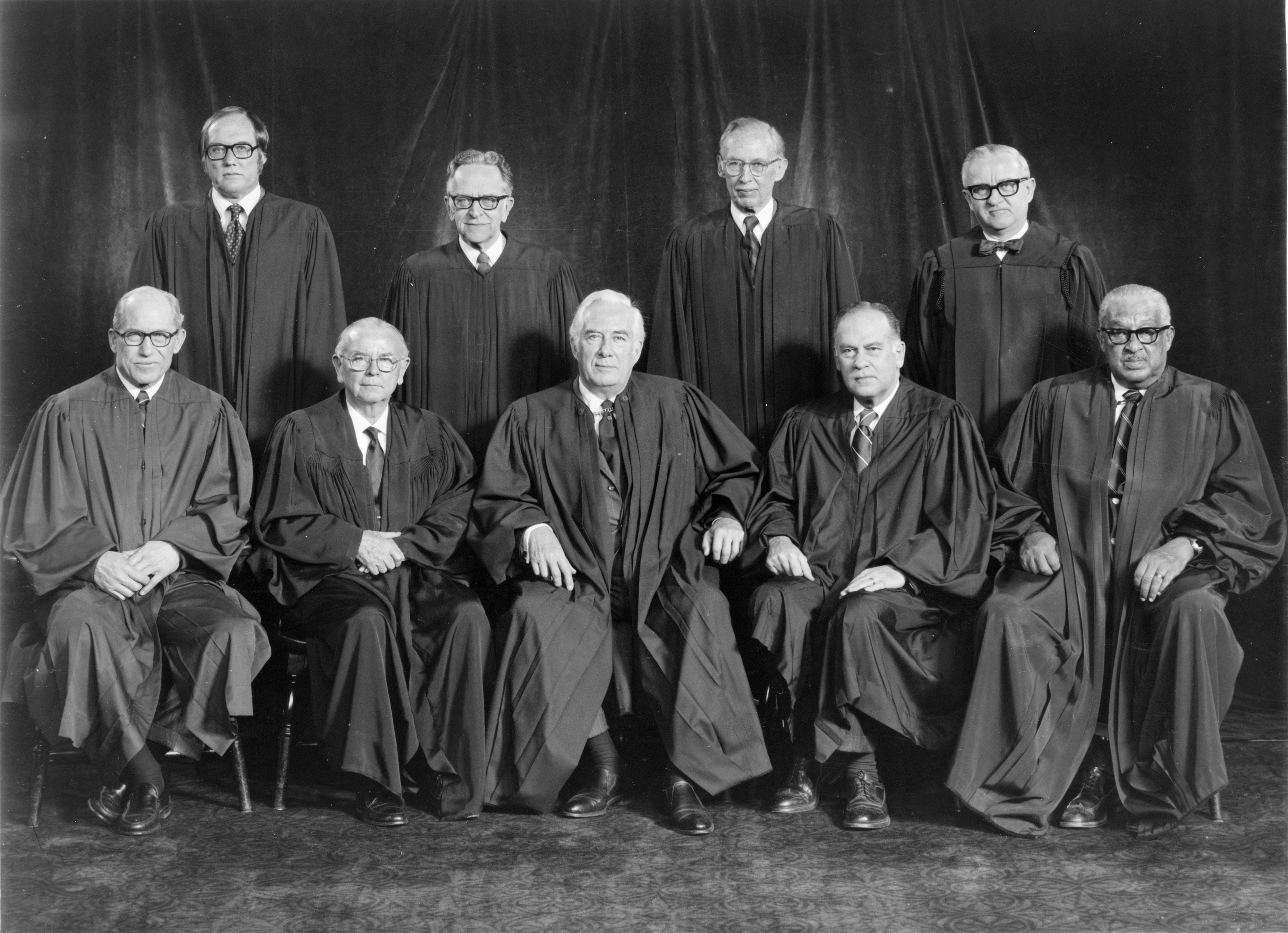
Justices of the Supreme Court of the United States, 1976. Marshall is in the bottom row, first from the right.

As the Court became increasingly conservative, Marshall found himself dissenting in numerous cases regarding racial discrimination. When the majority held in Milliken v. Bradley that a lower court had gone too far in ordering busing to reduce racial imbalances between schools in Detroit, he dissented, criticizing his colleagues for what he viewed as a lack of resolve to implement desegregation even when faced with difficulties and public resistance. In a dissent in City of Memphis v. Greene that according to Tushnet "demonstrated his sense of the practical reality that formed the context for abstract legal issues", he argued that a street closure that made it more difficult for residents of an African-American neighborhood to reach a city park was unconstitutional because it sent "a plain and powerful symbolic message" to blacks "that because of their race, they are to stay out of the all-white enclave ... and should instead take the long way around". Marshall felt that affirmative action was both necessary and constitutional; in an opinion in Regents of the University of California v. Bakke, he commented that it was "more than a little ironic that, after several hundred years of class-based discrimination against Negroes, the Court is unwilling to hold that a class-based remedy for that discrimination is permissible". Dissenting in City of Richmond v. J.A. Croson Co., he rejected the majority's decision to strike down an affirmative-action program for government contractors, stating that he did "not believe that this Nation is anywhere close to eradicating racial discrimination or its vestiges".

Marshall's most influential contribution to constitutional doctrine was his "sliding-scale" approach to the Equal Protection Clause, which posited that the judiciary should assess a law's constitutionality by balancing its goals against its impact on groups and rights. Dissenting in Dandridge v. Williams, a case in which the majority upheld Maryland's $250-a-month cap on welfare payments against claims that it was insufficient for large families, he argued that rational basis review was not appropriate in cases involving "the literally vital interests of a powerless minority". In what Cass Sunstein described as the justice's greatest opinion, Marshall dissented when the Court in San Antonio Independent School District v. Rodriguez upheld a system in which local schools were funded mainly through property taxes, arguing that the policy (which meant that poorer school districts obtained less money than richer ones) resulted in unconstitutional discrimination. His dissent in Harris v. McRae, in which the Court upheld the Hyde Amendment's ban on the use of Medicaid funds to pay for abortions, rebuked the majority for applying a "relentlessly formalistic catechism" that failed to take account of the amendment's "crushing burden on indigent women". Although Marshall's sliding-scale approach was never adopted by the Court as a whole, the legal scholar Susan Low Bloch comments that "his consistent criticism seems to have prodded the Court to somewhat greater flexibility".

=== Criminal procedure and capital punishment ===
Marshall supported the Warren Court's constitutional decisions on criminal law, and he wrote the opinion of the Court in Benton v. Maryland, which held that the Constitution's prohibition of double jeopardy applied to the states. After the retirements of Warren and Justice Hugo Black, however, "Marshall was continually shocked at the refusal" of the Burger and Rehnquist Courts "to hold police and those involved in the criminal justice system responsible for acting according to the language and the spirit of fundamental procedural guarantees", according to Ball. He favored a strict interpretation of the Fourth Amendment's warrant requirement and opposed rulings that made exceptions to that provision; in United States v. Ross, for instance, he indignantly dissented when the Court upheld a conviction that was based on evidence discovered during a warrantless search of containers that had been found in an automobile. Marshall felt strongly that the Miranda doctrine should be expanded and fully enforced. In cases involving the Sixth Amendment, he argued that defendants must have competent attorneys; dissenting in Strickland v. Washington, Marshall (parting ways with Brennan) rejected the majority's conclusion that defendants must prove prejudice in ineffective assistance of counsel cases.

Marshall fervently opposed capital punishment throughout his time on the Court, arguing that it was cruel and unusual and therefore unconstitutional under the Eighth Amendment. He was the only justice with considerable experience defending those charged with capital crimes, and he expressed concern about the fact that injustices in death-penalty cases could not be remedied, often commenting: "Death is so lasting." In Furman v. Georgia, a case in which the Court struck down the capital-punishment statutes that were in force at the time, Marshall wrote that the death penalty was "morally unacceptable to the people of the United States at this time in their history" and that it "falls upon the poor, the ignorant, and the underprivileged members of society". When the Court in Gregg v. Georgia upheld new death-penalty laws that required juries to consider aggravating and mitigating circumstances, he dissented, describing capital punishment as a "vestigial savagery" that was immoral and violative of the Eighth Amendment. Afterwards, Marshall and Brennan dissented in every instance in which the Court declined to review a death sentence, filing more than 1,400 dissents that read: "Adhering to our views that the death penalty is in all circumstances cruel and unusual punishment prohibited by the Eighth and Fourteenth Amendments, we would grant certiorari and vacate the death sentence in this case."

=== First Amendment ===
According to Ball, Marshall felt that the rights protected by the First Amendment were the Constitution's most important principles and that they could be restricted only for extremely compelling reasons. In a 1969 opinion in Stanley v. Georgia, he held that it was unconstitutional to criminalize the possession of obscene material. For the Court, he reversed the conviction of a Georgia man charged with possessing pornography, writing: "If the First Amendment means anything, it means that a State has no business telling a man, sitting alone in his own house, what books he may read or what films he may watch." In Amalgamated Food Employees Union Local 400 v. Logan Valley Plaza, he wrote for the Court that protesters had the right to picket on private property that was open to the public—a decision that was effectively overruled (over Marshall's dissent) four years later in Lloyd Corporation v. Tanner. He emphasized equality in his free speech opinions, writing in Chicago Police Dept. v. Mosley that "above all else, the First Amendment means that government has no power to restrict expression because of its messages, its ideas, its subject matter, or its content". Making comparisons to earlier civil rights protests, Marshall vigorously dissented in Clark v. Community for Creative Non-Violence, a case in which the Court ruled that the government could forbid homeless individuals from protesting poverty by sleeping overnight in Lafayette Park; although Burger decried their claims as "frivolous" attempts to "trivialize" the Constitution, Marshall argued that the protesters were engaged in constitutionally protected symbolic speech.

Marshall joined the majority in Texas v. Johnson and United States v. Eichman, two cases in which the Court held that the First Amendment protected the right to burn the American flag. He favored the total separation of church and state, dissenting when the Court upheld in Lynch v. Donnelly a city's display of a nativity scene and joining the majority in Wallace v. Jaffree to strike down an Alabama law regarding prayer in schools. On the issue of the free exercise of religion, Marshall voted with the majority in Wisconsin v. Yoder to hold that a school attendance law could not be constitutionally applied to the Amish, and he joined Justice Harry Blackmun's dissent when the Court in Employment Division v. Smith upheld a restriction on religious uses of peyote and curtailed Sherbert v. Verner's strict scrutiny standard. In the view of J. Clay Smith Jr. and Scott Burrell, the justice was "an unyielding supporter of civil liberties", whose "commitment to the values of the First Amendment was enhanced from actually realizing the historical consequences of being on the weaker and poorer side of power".

=== Privacy ===
In Marshall's view, the Constitution guaranteed to all citizens the right to privacy; he felt that although the Constitution nowhere mentioned such a right expressly, it could be inferred from various provisions of the Bill of Rights. He joined the majority in Eisenstadt v. Baird to strike down a statute that prohibited the distribution or sale of contraceptives to unmarried persons, dissented when the Court in Bowers v. Hardwick upheld an anti-sodomy law, and dissented from the majority's decision in Cruzan v. Director, Missouri Department of Health that the Constitution did not protect an unconditional right to die. On the issue of abortion rights, the author Carl T. Rowan comments that "no justice ever supported a woman's right to choice as uncompromisingly as Marshall did". He joined Blackmun's opinion for the Court in Roe v. Wade, which held that the Constitution protected a woman's right to have an abortion, and he consistently voted against state laws that sought to limit that right in cases such as Maher v. Roe, H. L. v. Matheson, Akron v. Akron Center for Reproductive Health, Thornburgh v. American College of Obstetricians & Gynecologists, and Webster v. Reproductive Health Services.

=== Other topics ===
During his service on the Supreme Court, Marshall participated in over 3,400 cases and authored 322 majority opinions. He was a member of the unanimous majority in United States v. Nixon that rejected President Nixon's claims of absolute executive privilege. Marshall wrote several influential decisions in the fields of corporate law and securities law, including a frequently-cited opinion regarding materiality in TSC Industries, Inc. v. Northway, Inc. His opinions involving personal jurisdiction, such as Shaffer v. Heitner, were pragmatic and de-emphasized the importance of state boundaries. According to Tushnet, Marshall was "the Court's liberal specialist in Native American law"; he endeavored to protect Native Americans from regulatory action on the part of the states. He favored a rigid interpretation of procedural requirements, saying in one case that "rules mean what they say"—a position that in Tushnet's view was motivated by the justice's "traditionalist streak".

Like most Supreme Court justices, many of Marshall's law clerks went on to become prominent lawyers and legal scholars. His clerks included future Supreme Court justice Elena Kagan, U.S. circuit judge Douglas H. Ginsburg, and legal scholars Cass Sunstein, Mark Tushnet, and Martha Minow.

== Personal life ==
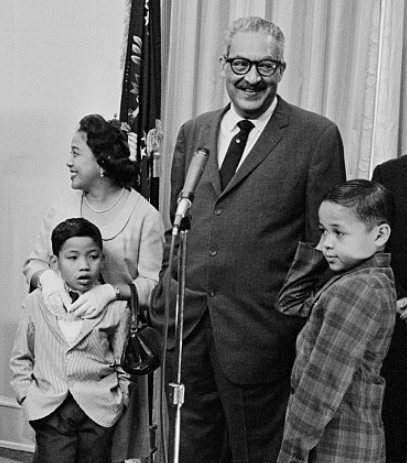
Marshall, his wife Cissy, and their children John (bottom left) and Thurgood Jr. (bottom right), 1965

Marshall wed Vivian "Buster" Burey on September 4, 1929, while he was a student at Lincoln University. They remained married until her death from cancer in 1955. Marshall married Cecilia "Cissy" Suyat, an NAACP secretary, eleven months later; they had two children: Thurgood Jr. and John. Thurgood Jr. became an attorney and worked in the Clinton administration, and John directed the U.S. Marshals Service and served as Virginia's secretary of public safety.

Marshall was an active member of the Episcopal Church and served as a delegate to its 1964 convention, walking out after a resolution to recognize a right to disobey immoral segregation laws was voted down. He was a Prince Hall Mason, attending meetings and participating in rituals. He refused to attend the Supreme Court's annual Christmas party believing that it infringed upon the separation of church and state.

Justice Sandra Day O'Connor, who served with Marshall on the Supreme Court for a decade, wrote that "it was rare during our conference deliberations that he would not share an anecdote, a joke or a story"; although O'Connor initially treated the stories as "welcome diversions", she later "realized that behind most of the anecdotes was a relevant legal point".

== Retirement, later life, and death ==
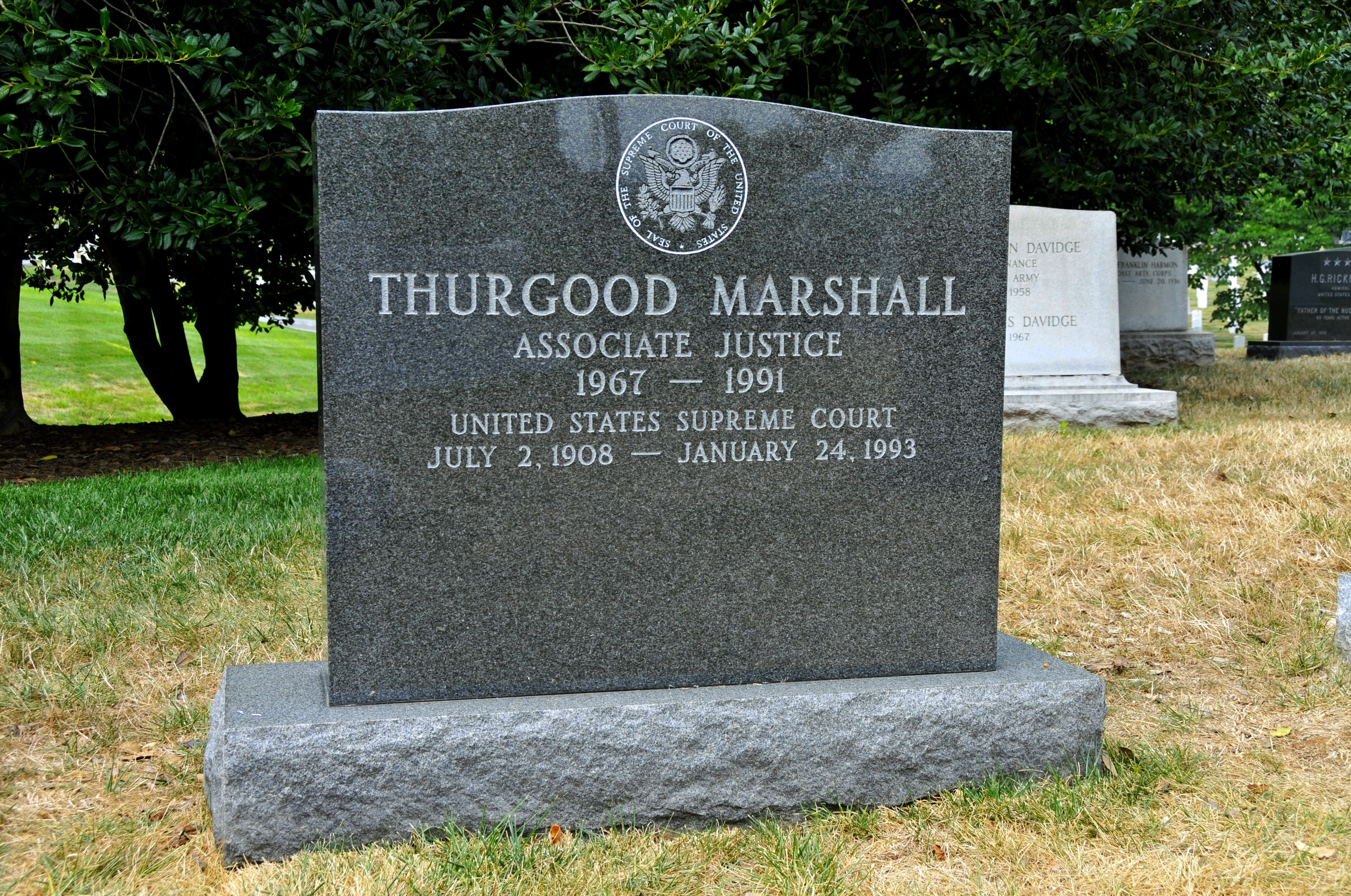
Marshall's gravestone at Arlington National Cemetery

Marshall did not wish to retire—he frequently said "I was appointed to a life term, and I intend to serve it"—but he had been in ill health for many years, and Brennan's retirement in 1990 left him unhappy and isolated on the Court. The 82-year-old justice announced on June 27, 1991, that he would retire. When asked at a press conference what was wrong with him that would cause him to leave the Court, he replied: "What's wrong with me? I'm old. I'm getting old and coming apart!"

President George H. W. Bush (whom Marshall loathed) nominated Clarence Thomas, who had served in the Reagan and Bush administrations, to replace Marshall. His retirement took effect on October 1.

Marshall served as a visiting judge on the Second Circuit for a week in January 1992, and he received the American Bar Association's highest award in August of that year. His health continued to deteriorate, and, on January 24, 1993, at the Bethesda Naval Medical Center, he died of heart failure. He was 84 years old.

Marshall lay in repose in the Great Hall of the Supreme Court, and thousands thronged there to pay their respects; more than four thousand attended his funeral service at the Washington National Cathedral. The civil rights leader Vernon E. Jordan said that Marshall had "demonstrat[ed] that the law could be an instrument of liberation", while Chief Justice William Rehnquist gave a eulogy in which he said: "Inscribed above the front entrance to the Supreme Court building are the words 'Equal justice under law'. Surely no one individual did more to make these words a reality than Thurgood Marshall." Marshall was buried at Arlington National Cemetery.

== Appraisal and legacy ==
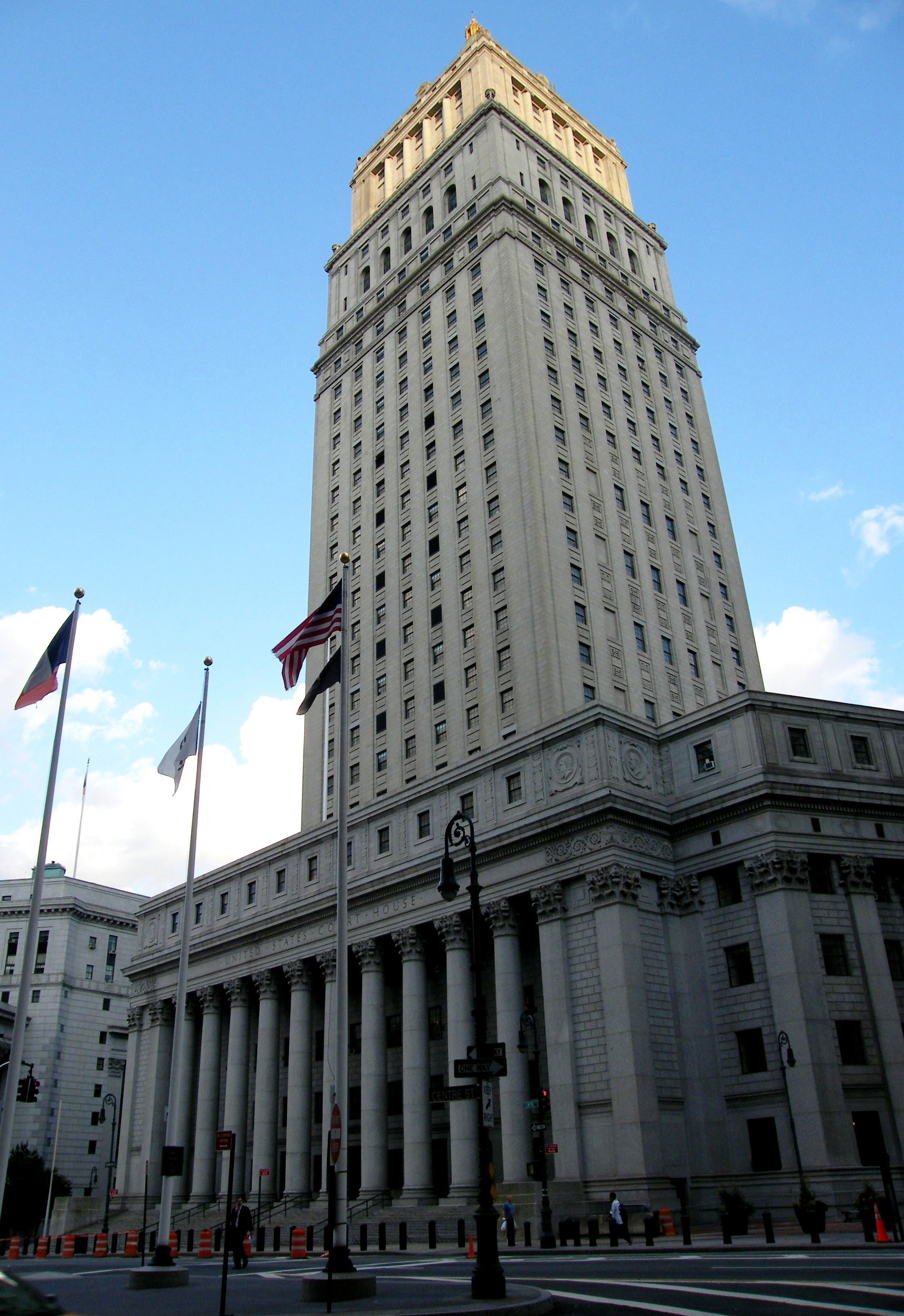
The Thurgood Marshall United States Courthouse, renamed in Marshall's honor in 2001

According to the scholar Daniel Moak, Marshall "profoundly shaped the political direction of the United States", "transformed constitutional law", and "opened up new facets of citizenship to black Americans". For Tushnet, he was "probably the most important American lawyer of the twentieth century"; in the view of the political scientist Robert C. Smith, he was "one of the greatest leaders in the history of the African-American struggle for freedom and equality". A 1999 survey of black political scientists listed Marshall as one of the ten greatest African-American leaders in history; panelists described him as the "greatest jurist of the twentieth century" and stated that he "spearheaded the creation of the legal foundations of the civil rights movement". Scholars of the Supreme Court have not rated Marshall as highly as some of his colleagues: although his pre–Supreme Court legal career and his staunch liberalism have met with broad approval, a perception that he lacked substantial influence over his fellow justices has harmed his reputation. In Abraham's view, "he was one of America's greatest public lawyers, but he was not a great Supreme Court justice". A 1993 survey of legal scholars found that Marshall was ranked as the seventeenth-greatest justice of the Supreme Court—a rating that, while still lower than that of his fellow liberal justices, was substantially higher than was recorded in an earlier survey.

Marshall has received numerous tributes. The state of Maryland renamed Baltimore's airport the Baltimore/Washington International Thurgood Marshall Airport in 2005, and the University of Maryland's law library is named in his honor. Buildings named for Marshall include New York's 590-foot-high Thurgood Marshall United States Courthouse (renamed in 2001), where he heard cases as an appellate judge, and the federal judicial center in Washington. He is the namesake of streets and schools throughout the nation, including notably Thurgood Marshall College at the University of California, San Diego. Marshall posthumously received the Presidential Medal of Freedom from President Bill Clinton in 1993, and the United States Postal Service issued a commemorative stamp in his honor in 2003. He was depicted by Sidney Poitier in the 1991 television movie Separate but Equal, by Laurence Fishburne in George Stevens Jr.'s Broadway play Thurgood, and by Chadwick Boseman in the 2017 film Marshall.

In 2006, the Episcopal Diocese of Washington proposed naming Marshall a saint and adding a feast day honoring him to the Episcopal liturgical calendar. May 17 was selected as the Feast of Thurgood Marshall to mark the Brown v. Board of Education Supreme Court decision. His feast day was included among the Lesser Feasts and Fasts on a trial basis in 2009, and he was made a permanent saint of the church in 2018.

== See also ==
- List of African-American jurists
- List of African-American federal judges
- List of justices of the Supreme Court of the United States
- List of law clerks for the tenth seat of the Supreme Court of the United States
- List of United States Supreme Court justices by time in office
- United States Supreme Court cases during the Warren Court
- United States Supreme Court cases during the Burger Court
- United States Supreme Court cases during the Rehnquist Court

== Notes ==
Legal offices
New seat	Judge of the United States Court of Appeals for the Second Circuit; 1961–1965	Succeeded by Wilfred Feinberg
Preceded by Archibald Cox	Solicitor General of the United States; 1965–1967	Succeeded by Erwin Griswold
Preceded by Tom C. Clark	Associate Justice of the Supreme Court of the United States; 1967–1991	Succeeded by Clarence Thomas
