= Stanley Meador =

American government official

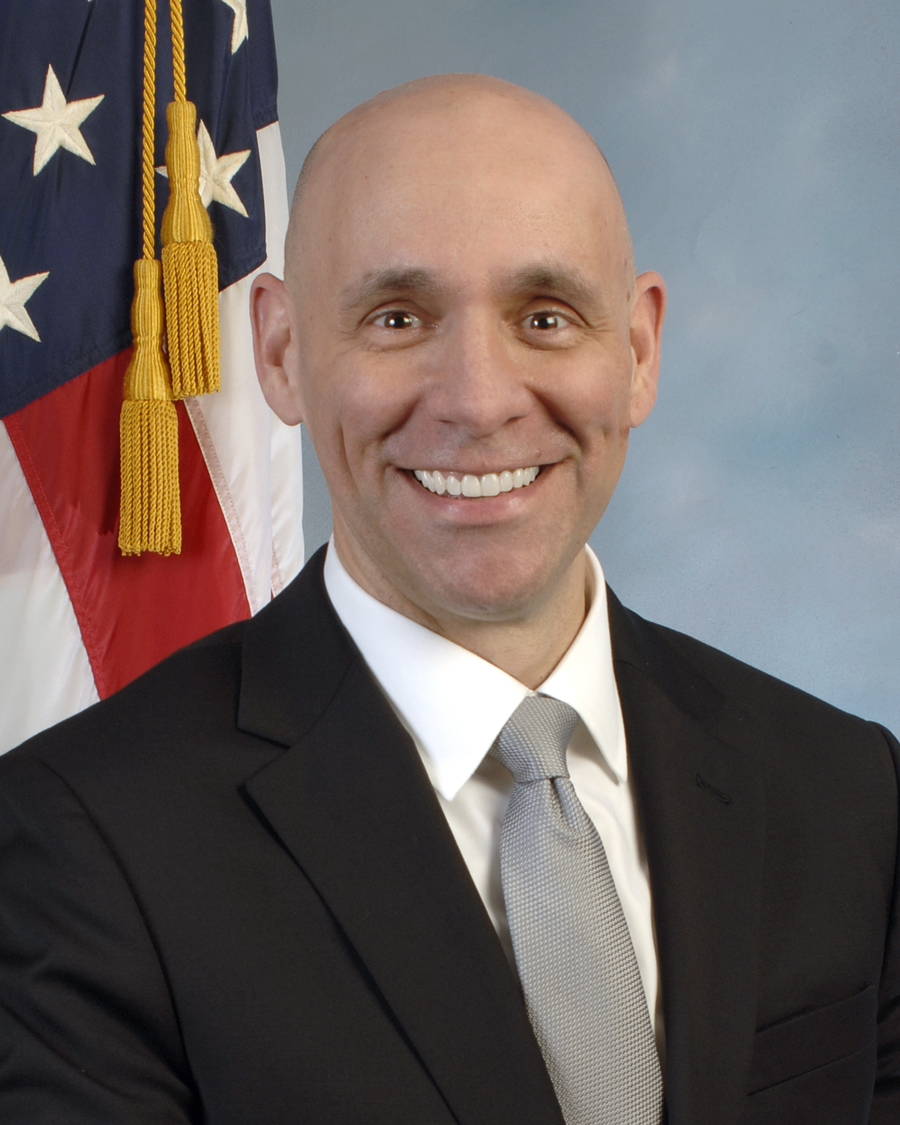
- Official portrait, 2021

10th Virginia Secretary of Public Safety and Homeland Security
- Incumbent
- Assumed office Jan 17, 2026
- Governor: Abigail Spanberger
- Preceded by: Marcus Anderson

Personal details
- Children: 3
- Education: Roanoke College (B.A.); American University (M.A.)

Stanley Meador is an American government official who is currently serving as the 10th Virginia Secretary of Public Safety and Homeland Security under Governor Abigail Spanberger. A former FBI agent, he served as Special Agent-in-Charge of the Richmond Field Office from 2021 to 2025.

== Early Law Enforcement Career ==
Meador began his career in 1997 as a special agent with the Virginia Alcoholic Beverage Control Authority. While serving in this role, he responded to the crash of American Airlines Flight 77 into the Pentagon during the September 11th attacks. He remained on-site for a total of eight days, later receiving a Valor Award for his actions.

In 2002, Meador joined the FBI as a special agent, serving at the Seattle and Las Vegas field offices. He was later assigned to FBI Headquarters, and in 2014 became Chief of Asia Operations. In 2019, he served as Assistant Special Agent-in-Charge of the Philadelphia field office, before becoming Chief of Staff to the deputy director of the FBI in 2020. In 2021, Meador was appointed Special Agent-in-Charge of the Richmond Field Office, and was later elected Chairman of the Special Agent-in-Charge Advisory Committee.

== Role in the "Catholic memo" ==
During his tenure as Special Agent-in-Charge, a controversial internal memo was leaked from the Richmond Field Office that identified "traditionalist Catholics" as potential violent domestic extremists. The memo resulted in widespread criticism from Catholic Americans and Republican congressmen, and prompted a congressional investigation and a review by the Department of Justice Office of Inspector General. Though Meador did not personally author nor approve the memo, his actions following the incident were met with significant scrutiny as the field office's top agent. He later met with leaders of the Catholic Diocese of Richmond and apologized for the negative attention generated by the memo. Meador testified before the Republican-controlled House Judiciary Committee, and was met with criticism in their report following the incident. A report by the DOJ Inspector General found that while the memo violated the department's own standards, it lacked any evidence of bias or malicious intent.

In 2025, Meador was placed on administrative leave due to his role in the memo. His ousting occurred during widespread purges of FBI officials during the second Trump administration, which has been criticized as Donald Trump's targeting of political opponents and civil society and democratic backsliding.

== Virginia Secretary of Public Safety ==
In 2026, Virginia Governor Abigail Spanberger announced Meador as her Secretary of Public Safety and Homeland Security. In this role, he will oversee agencies such as the Virginia State Police, Virginia Department of Corrections, Virginia Parole Board, as well as the commonwealth's fire protection, emergency management, and homeland security apparatuses. His appointment was condemned by the conservative advocacy group CatholicVote.org due to his role in the controversial memo.

== Personal life ==
Meador grew up on a farm in Galax, Virginia, and graduated from Galax High School. He spent his freshman year at Ferrum College before transferring to Roanoke College, graduating with a Bachelor's of Arts in Criminal Justice. He is married with three children.

In 2012, Meador was diagnosed with Stage 3 colon cancer following his eight-day work in the rubble pile of the Pentagon. His diagnosis occurred among a high prevalence of health issues experienced by 9/11 first responders. Following chemotherapy and surgeries, he has reportedly been cancer-free.
