= Thurgood Marshall Jr. =

American lawyer

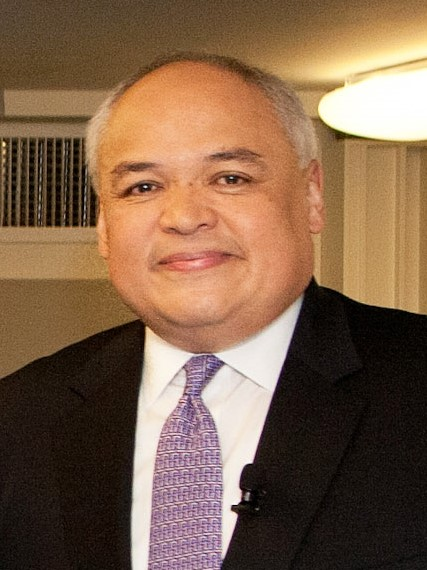
- Marshall in 2012

Chairman of the Board of Governors of the United States Postal Service
- In office November 15, 2011 – September 13, 2018
- President: Barack Obama; Donald Trump
- Preceded by: Louis J. Giuliano
- Succeeded by: Mike Duncan

Member of the Board of Governors of the United States Postal Service
- In office December 15, 2006 – September 13, 2018
- Appointed by: George W. Bush
- Preceded by: Ned McWherter
- Succeeded by: Mike Duncan

White House Cabinet Secretary
- In office February 7, 1997 – January 20, 2001
- President: Bill Clinton
- Preceded by: Kitty Higgins
- Succeeded by: Albert Hawkins III

Personal details
- Born: August 12, 1956 (age 70) New York City, U.S.
- Party: Democratic
- Spouse: Teddi Levy (m. 2008)
- Relations: John W. Marshall (brother)
- Children: 2
- Parents: Thurgood Marshall (father); Cecilia Suyat Marshall (mother)
- Education: University of Virginia (BA, JD)

Thurgood Marshall Jr. (born August 12, 1956) is an American lawyer and son of the late United States Supreme Court Justice Thurgood Marshall. Marshall worked in the Bill Clinton White House and is a retired international law firm partner. He also served as chairman of the Board of Governors of the United States Postal Service and as a member of the Board of Trustees of the Ford Foundation.

He is a member of the board of directors of En+ Group, the world's largest producer of low-carbon aluminum and independent hydropower; and DRB Capital a financial services firm headquartered in Florida. According to documents filed with the SEC, he is a director serving on the board of Corrections Corporation of America, the largest commercial vendor of federal detainment and prisoner transport in the United States. Since 2012, Marshall is also an independent director serving on the board of Genesco, an international footwear and apparel retailer based in Nashville, Tennessee.

== Early life and education ==
Marshall was born on August 12, 1956, in New York City. He is the son of Justice Thurgood Marshall, the first Black American to serve on the U.S. Supreme Court and Cecilia Suyat Marshall, a Filipino American who was Marshall's second wife after his first wife died of lung cancer. His brother is John W. Marshall, a former Virginia Secretary of Public Safety and former U.S. Marshals Service Director.

Marshall attended school at Georgetown Day School in Washington, D.C., and the Dalton School in New York City and graduated from Phillips Exeter Academy. He earned a Bachelor of Arts from the University of Virginia in 1978, and a Juris Doctor at the University of Virginia School of Law in 1981.

== Career ==
=== Government ===
Early in his career, Marshall clerked for United States District Judge Barrington D. Parker. He practiced law with a firm based in Washington and New York prior to working on Capitol Hill and in The White House. He served as a Counsel to Senator Edward M. Kennedy with the Senate's Judiciary Committee; Counsel to Senator Ernest F. Hollings and Senator Albert Gore Jr. with the Senate's Commerce, Science & Transportation Committee; and Counsel to Senator Albert Gore Jr. with the Senate's Governmental Affairs Committee.

Marshall served as director of legislative affairs and deputy counsel to Vice President Al Gore, for whom he had previously worked in the United States Senate and as deputy campaign manager of the Al Gore 1988 presidential campaign and as traveling policy advisor on the Bill Clinton 1992 presidential campaign.

Marshall worked in the Clinton administration from 1997 as assistant to the president and White House Cabinet Secretary. In that role, he managed White House relations with the executive departments; his responsibilities included organizing cabinet meetings and briefings, compiling a daily update of cabinet department activities, and coordinating responses to natural and transportation disasters. As vice-chair of the White House Olympic Task Force, he coordinated federal government's preparations for the 2002 Salt Lake City Winter Olympic and Paralympic Games. He was also a member of the Interagency Task Force on U.S. Coast Guard Roles and Missions.

President Clinton named Marshall to the Presidential Delegation to the Inauguration of South African President Nelson Mandela in 1994. Marshall also served as a member of the Presidential Election Observer Delegation to Bosnia in 1998. That delegation was led by Ambassador Robert Gelbard. Marshall was a member of the United States Delegation to the 2000 Summer Olympics.

=== Private practice ===
Marshall joined Bingham McCutchen as a partner when it acquired Swidler Berlin, where he had been a partner since 2003. In addition to counseling clients, Marshall provided internal advice to Swidler Berlin on ethics compliance and corporate governance. He became a managing director of Swidler Berlin's Harbour Group in 2005. He became part of Bingham McCutchen's Government Affairs practice, counseling clients on relations with Congress, the Executive Branch and independent regulatory agencies. He has provided legislative and regulatory counsel on corporate mergers, professional and amateur sports, commercial aviation, utilities and banking regulation, and legal process reform.

After his work in the Clinton administration, Marshall joined Swidler Berlin.

Marshall joined Morgan Lewis in 2014 when it acquired a group of lawyers from the now-defunct Bingham McCutchen firm.

Marshall has been named one of Washington's top campaign and election lawyers by Washingtonian Magazine, a leading lawyer in government relations law by The Best Lawyers in America, and included on the Best Lawyers List of the Washington Post Magazine. Newsweek named him one of the 100 people to watch in the new century.

=== Publications ===
Marshall has authored or co-authored columns that have appeared in the Tampa Bay Times, Sabato's Crystal Ball (UVA Center for Politics), The Straits Times, Politico, The Hill, The Legal Times, The Washington Post, and The National WWII Museum.

=== Other work ===
Marshall is a board member or trustee with the Campaign Legal Center, Third Way, and the Schwarzenegger Institute for State & Global Policy. He serves on the local DC boards of President Lincoln's Cottage, the Dean's Advisory Council for the UMD School of Public Policy, and the DC Grays. Marshall was a senior advisor to All America PAC, a political organization establish by former Senator Evan Bayh. Marshall was the director of congressional relations for Wesley Clark's 2004 presidential campaign. He has been involved with the National Fish and Wildlife Foundation, serving on the board of the Foundation for eight years and promoting environmental science and other science education. He also volunteers at a local food bank and other community service outlets in the Washington, D.C. area.

Marshall has been a member of the United States Postal Service Board of Governors, Ford Foundation, Corrections Corporation of America, Genesco, National Women's Law Center, the University of Arkansas Clinton School of Public Service, and the Supreme Court Historical Society. He has been a member of the Ethics Advisory Committee of the United States Olympic Committee since its inception in 2001 until 2012 and chaired the Advisory Commission of the American Bar Association Standing Committee on Election Law.

He has participated in election and election law observer missions to Bosnia, Chile, Ecuador, and Nicaragua. Marshall is also a veteran of U.S. presidential campaigns.

== Personal life ==
Marshall and his second wife, Teddi Levy Marshall, the vice president and founder of Rolling Greens Inc., were married on April 25, 2008. They were married at the Supreme Court of the United States and Associate Justice Stephen G. Breyer performed the ceremony. The couple lives in the Washington, D.C., area. Marshall was previously married to Colleen P. Mahoney, a 1981 graduate of American University School of Law and a retired partner at Skadden Arps. Marshall and Mahoney have two sons, Thurgood William and Edward Patrick Marshall. Marshall and his first wife Colleen, were sworn into the Supreme Court together on June 24, 1991 by Marshall's father, the Supreme Court justice.

Political offices
Preceded by Kitty Higgins	White House Cabinet Secretary; 1997–2001	Succeeded by Albert Hawkins
