= Gloster B. Current =

American activist (1913–1997)

Gloster B. Current (1913 – July 3, 1997) was deputy executive director of the National Association for the Advancement of Colored People (NAACP) and the National Director of Branches and Field Administration of the NAACP during the Civil Rights Movement. It was a period of major expansion and activism for the NAACP. He also wrote a book, was an accomplished jazz musician, and was an ordained Methodist minister. His first wife was Leontine Turpeau, also a minister; they had three children but later divorced. At the time of his death, he lived in Hollis, Queens, with his wife second wife Rebecca Busch Current.

Current came to New York City from Detroit in 1946 at the behest of Walter Francis White. Cecilia Suyat Marshall was his private secretary at the NAACP. His papers were given to Wayne State University.

He died on July 3, 1997, of leukemia and pneumonia.

Roscoe Lee Browne portrayed Current in For Us the Living: The Medgar Evers Story (1983), a film about Medgar Evers. Current claimed to have been the last person to speak with Evers.
