= Gary K. Aronhalt =

American lawyer (1949–2021)

10th Virginia Secretary of Public Safety
- In office January 17, 1998 – January 14, 2002
- Governor: Jim Gilmore
- Preceded by: Jerry Kilgore
- Succeeded by: John W. Marshall

Personal details
- Born: Gary King Aronhalt; March 12, 1949
- Died: May 1, 2021 (aged 72)
- Party: Republican
- Spouse: Darleen Snyder
- Education: Harvard University (BA); American University (JD)

Gary King Aronhalt (March 12, 1949 – May 1, 2021) was an American lawyer who served as Virginia Secretary of Public Safety under Governor Jim Gilmore.

Political offices
Preceded by Jerry Kilgore	Virginia Secretary of Public Safety; 1998–2002	Succeeded by John W. Marshall
