= John W. Marshall =

American politician (born 1958)

11th Virginia Secretary of Public Safety
- In office January 14, 2002 – January 16, 2010
- Governor: Mark Warner; Tim Kaine
- Preceded by: Gary K. Aronhalt
- Succeeded by: Marla Graff Decker

7th Director of the United States Marshals Service
- In office November 17, 1999 – January 2001
- President: Bill Clinton
- Preceded by: Eduardo Gonzalez
- Succeeded by: Benigno G. Reyna

Personal details
- Born: John William Marshall; July 6, 1958 (age 68) New York City, U.S.
- Party: Democratic
- Parents: Thurgood Marshall (father); Cecilia Suyat (mother)
- Relatives: Thurgood Marshall Jr. (brother)
- Education: Georgetown University (BA)

John William Marshall (born July 6, 1958) is an American politician who served as Secretary of Public Safety in the Cabinet of Virginia Governor Mark Warner from 2002 to 2006 and Governor Tim Kaine from 2006 to 2010, and was the longest-serving member of the Virginia Governor's Cabinet.

Prior to becoming Virginia Secretary of Public Safety in January 2002, Marshall served in the Virginia State Police from 1980 to 1994, where he was assigned as a State Trooper, Narcotics Division Special Agent, Training Academy Instructor, and Field Operations Sergeant. From 1994 to 1999, he served as United States Marshal for the Eastern District of Virginia. In 1999, he was appointed as the first African-American Director of the United States Marshals Service by President Bill Clinton, serving in that post until 2001. His educational background includes a B.A. in government from Georgetown University, and a Post-Baccalaureate Certificate in Administration of Justice from Virginia Commonwealth University.

Following his resignation as Virginia Secretary of Public Safety in January 2010, Marshall served as a consultant and senior advisor to the Thurgood Marshall College Fund until January 2011, and subsequently became a public speaker on topics including criminal justice and civil rights.

Marshall is the son of Thurgood Marshall, the first African American U.S. Supreme Court Justice, and Cecilia Suyat Marshall, his Filipino American mother. He is also the brother of Thurgood Marshall Jr., former Secretary to the Cabinet in the Clinton administration.

Political offices
Preceded by Gary K. Aronhalt	Virginia Secretary of Public Safety; 2002–2010	Succeeded by Marla Graff Decker
