= David Turpeau =

American politician in Ohio (1873–1947)

David Dewitt Turpeau Sr. (November 8, 1873 – February 13, 1947) was a Methodist minister and state legislator in Ohio. He wrote an autobiography. He was elected to the Ohio House of Representatives in 1939 and served in it until his death. He was a Republican.

He was born in St. Martinville, Louisiana. He died at his home in Cincinnati on February 13, 1947, aged 73.

He married Ila B. Marshall, who was active in community organizations. Anita and Leontine were two of their children.

== See also ==
- List of African-American officeholders (1900–1959)
