= Vivian Burey Marshall =

American civil rights activist

- Born: Vivian Burey; February 11, 1911; Philadelphia, Pennsylvania, U.S.
- Died: February 11, 1955 (aged 44)
- Other names: Vivien Burey Marshall, Buster
- Education: University of Pennsylvania
- Occupation: Civil rights activist
- Spouse: Thurgood Marshall (m. 1929)

Vivian "Buster" Burey Marshall (February 11, 1911 – February 11, 1955) was an American civil rights activist and was married for 25 years, until her death, to Thurgood Marshall, lead counsel for the NAACP Legal Defense Fund, who also managed Brown v. Board of Education (1954). Following her death, her husband was later appointed as the first African-American U.S. Supreme Court Justice.

== Biography ==
Vivian Burey was born in Philadelphia, Pennsylvania, on February 11, 1911. She grew up in a middle-class Black family; her parents Christopher and Maud Burey worked in catering in the city. She attended local schools.

She met Thurgood Marshall at age eighteen while she was a student at the University of Pennsylvania and he was a student at nearby Lincoln University.

Buster married Thurgood Marshall on September 4, 1929, during Marshall's last year at Lincoln. Marshall graduated cum laude and went on to graduate first in his law class at Howard University. After Buster's husband Thurgood graduated from college in 1930, they moved to Baltimore where she worked as a secretary. Burey had several miscarriages during her marriage and never had any children. Her husband had some affairs.

After Buster's husband completed law school, they moved to New York. In the mid-1940s he founded and served as director-counsel of the NAACP Legal Defense Fund, which was based in New York. Buster also worked at the NAACP and the Legal Defense Fund, alongside other civil rights activists such as Edward W. Jacko and Jawn A. Sandifer.

In the 1950s, Buster was diagnosed with flu or pleurisy; she was sick for months and eventually learned that she had lung cancer. She hid her sickness from her husband for months, as he was leading the case of Brown v. Board of Education at the US Supreme Court. After it ruled on May 17, 1954, Marshall told her husband about her illness. Richard Kluger credits Burey with being one of two people who had been indirectly active but important influencers of the Brown v. Board of Education decision, in his book, Simple Justice: The History of Brown v. Board of Education and Black America's Struggle for Equality (2011).

Marshall died of lung cancer on February 11, 1955, her 44th birthday, after 25 years of marriage.

Marshall's husband remarried in December 1955, to Cecilia Suyat, a woman who worked as a secretary at the NAACP Legal Defense Fund.

== Legacy ==
Named in her memory, the Vivian Burey Marshall Academy was founded in 2016 as a program of the Thurgood Marshall College Fund. It pairs students with U.S. Army scientists and engineers to encourage their studies in STEM. It serves students grades 6–10 in the Baltimore, Maryland, and Vicksburg, Mississippi, areas with a focus on Science, Technology, Engineering, and Mathematics (STEM) learning programs.

The 2017 movie Marshall is a Thurgood Marshall biopic about his early career, directed by Reginald Hudlin. It featured Keesha Sharp as Vivian Marshall.
