= Virginia Secretary of Public Safety =

Position in the Virginia government

Secretary of Public Safety and Homeland Security of the Commonwealth of Virginia
- Seal of the Commonwealth of Virginia

- Flag of Virginia

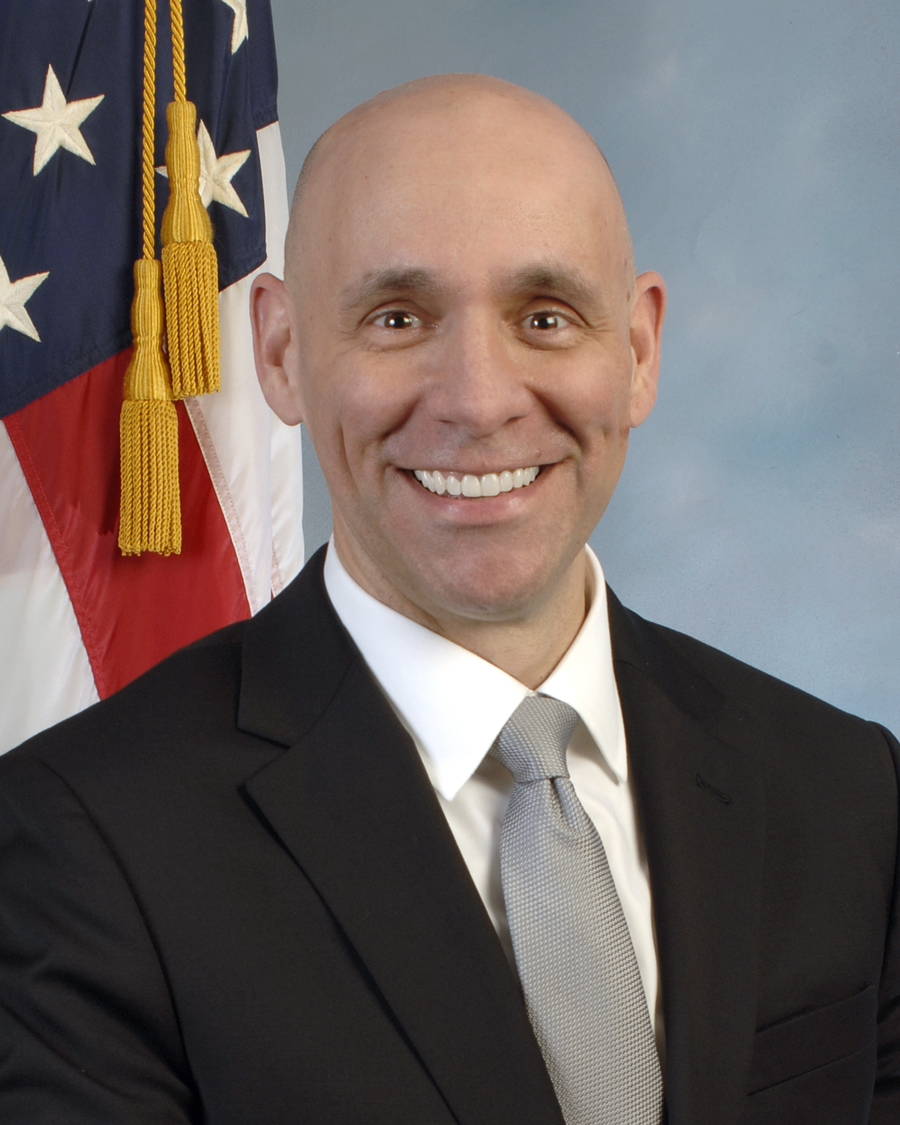
- Incumbent; Stanley Meador since January 17, 2026
- Style: Mr. Secretary
- Member of: Virginia Governor's Cabinet
- Nominator: The governor
- Appointer: The governor with advice and consent from the Senate and House
- Term length: 4 years
- Inaugural holder: Wayne A. Whitham (as Secretary of Transportation and Public Safety)
- Formation: April 8, 1972
- Website: pshs.virginia.gov

The secretary of public safety and homeland security is a Virginia government executive that serves as a member of the Virginia Governor's Cabinet. The current nominee for the position is Stanley Meador, appointed by Governor Abigail Spanberger.

== Duties ==
1. Work with and through others, including federal, state, and local officials as well as the private sector, to develop a seamless, coordinated security and preparedness strategy and implementation plan.
2. Serve as the point of contact with the United States Department of Homeland Security (Federal).
3. Provide oversight, coordination, and review of all disaster, emergency management, and terrorism management plans for the state and its agencies in coordination with the Virginia Department of Emergency Management and other applicable state agencies.
4. Work with federal officials to obtain additional federal resources and coordinate policy development and information exchange.
5. Work with and through appropriate members of the Governor's Cabinet to coordinate working relationships between state agencies and take all actions necessary to ensure that available federal and state resources are directed toward safeguarding Virginia and its citizens.
6. Designate a Commonwealth Interoperability Coordinator to ensure that all communications-related preparedness federal grant requests from state agencies and localities are used to enhance interoperability. The Secretary shall ensure that the annual review and update of the statewide interoperability strategic plan is conducted as required in § 2.2-222.2. The Commonwealth Interoperability Coordinator shall establish an advisory group consisting of representatives of state and local government and constitutional offices, broadly distributed across the Commonwealth, who are actively engaged in activities and functions related to communications interoperability.
7. Serve as one of the Governor's representatives on regional efforts to develop a coordinated security and preparedness strategy, including the National Capital Region Senior Policy Group organized as part of the federal Urban Areas Security Initiative.
8. Serve as a direct liaison between the Governor and local governments and first responders on issues of emergency prevention, preparedness, response, and recovery.
9. Educate the public on homeland security and overall preparedness issues in coordination with applicable state agencies.
10. Serve as chairman of the Secure Commonwealth Panel.
11. Encourage homeland security volunteer efforts throughout the state.
12. Coordinate the development of an allocation formula for State Homeland Security Grant Program funds to localities and state agencies in compliance with federal grant guidance and constraints. The formula shall be, to the extent permissible under federal constraints, based on actual risk, threat, and need.
13. Work with the appropriate state agencies to ensure that regional working groups are meeting regularly and focusing on regional initiatives in training, equipment, and strategy to ensure ready access to response teams in times of emergency and facilitate testing and training exercises for emergencies and mass casualty preparedness.
14. Provide oversight and review of the Virginia Department of Emergency Management's annual statewide assessment of local and regional capabilities, including equipment, training, personnel, response times, and other factors.
15. Employ, as needed, consultants, attorneys, architects, engineers, accountants, financial experts, investment bankers, superintendents, managers, and such other employees and agents as may be necessary, and fix their compensation to be payable from funds made available for that purpose.
16. Receive and accept from any federal or private agency, foundation, corporation, association, or person grants, donations of money, real property, or personal property for the benefit of the Commonwealth, and receive and accept from the Commonwealth or any state, any municipality, county, or other political subdivision thereof, or any other source, aid or contributions of money, property, or other things of value, to be held, used, and applied for the purposes for which such grants and contributions may be made.
17. Receive and accept from any source aid, grants, and contributions of money, property, labor, or other things of value to be held, used, and applied to carry out these requirements subject to the conditions upon which the aid, grants, or contributions are made.
18. Make grants to local governments, state and federal agencies, and private entities with any funds of the Secretary available for such purpose.
19. Take any actions necessary or convenient to the exercise of the powers granted or reasonably implied to this Secretary and not otherwise inconsistent with the law of the Commonwealth.

== History ==
In 1972, on the recommendation of Governor A. Linwood Holton Jr., the Virginia General Assembly established the Virginia Governor's Cabinet, which included a Secretary of Transportation and Public Safety. On April 12, 1976, the General Assembly established two separate secretariats for transportation and for public safety, effective July 1, 1976. The secretariats were merged again from 1984 to 1990 only to be split up again. The next major change to the office would not be until 2014, when Governor Terry McAuliffe transferred duties related to homeland security from the Virginia Secretary of Veterans Affairs to the Secretary of Public Safety.

== List of secretaries ==
=== Transportation and public safety (July 1, 1972–July 1, 1976) ===
- Wayne A. Whitham (1972–1976)

=== Public safety (July 1, 1976–July 1, 1984) ===
- H. Selwyn Smith (1976–1980)
- T. Rodman Layman (1980–1982)
- Franklin E. White (1982–1984)

=== Transportation and public safety (July 1, 1984–February 22, 1990) ===
- Franklin E. White (1984–1985)
- Andrew B. Fogarty (1985–1986)
- Vivian E. Watts (1986–1990)

=== Public safety (February 22, 1990–April 2, 2014) ===
- Robert L. Suthard (1990–1991)
- O. Randolph Rollins (1992–1994)
- Jerry W. Kilgore (1994–1998)
- Gary K. Aronhalt (1998–2002)
- John W. Marshall (2002–2010)
- Marla Graff Decker (2010–2014)
- Brian Moran (2014)

=== Public safety and homeland security (April 2, 2014–present) ===
- Brian Moran (2014–2022)
- Bob Mosier (2022–2023)
- Terry Cole (2023–2025)
- Marcus Anderson (2025–2026)
- Stanley Meador (2026-present)
