= 2022 United States House of Representatives elections in Virginia =

- November 8, 2022

All 11 Virginia seats to the United States House of Representatives
	Majority party	Minority party
Party	Democratic	Republican
Last election	7	4
Seats won	6	5
Seat change	▼1	▲1
Popular vote	1,572,296	1,462,049
Percentage	51.59%	47.97%
Swing	▼0.61%	▲0.55%

Democratic hold
Republican hold Republican gain
Democratic
40–50%
50–60%
60–70%
70–80%
80–90%
Republican
40–50%
50–60%
60–70%
70–80%
80–90%

The 2022 United States House of Representatives elections in Virginia were held on November 8, 2022, to elect the 11 U.S. representatives from the state of Virginia, one from each of the state's 11 congressional districts. The elections coincided with other elections to the House of Representatives. Pursuant to state law, primaries organized through the Department of Elections were held on June 21, 2022 (the third Tuesday of June). However, some Republican firehouse primaries were held on dates as late as May 21, 2022.

== Redistricting ==
=== Bipartisan Commission ===
Following the passage of Question 1 in the 2020 elections, a bipartisan redistricting commission was created. The commission holds 16 members: four from the House of Delegates, four from the Senate of Virginia, and eight citizens. It had 60 days following the release of the 2020 census data or until July 1, 2021, whichever was later, to approve a map, which had to be approved by the General Assembly.

As the 2020 census data was released on August 12, 2021 the deadline was set to October 11, 2021. Early in the commission meetings the Democrat and Republican sides both hired partisan map makers and legal advisers. This created worry they would cause the commission to become too partisan to create a compromise map. This was proved true after it became clear that the commission would not create a Congressional map within the deadline after it failed to create any progress on a starting draft for the General Assembly maps, which it had solely focused on. The failure of the commission was shown even more clearly when, out of growing frustration from the lack of compromise, three Democratic members of the commission walked out, breaking any chance of a deal. After the walkout no other progress was made and the deadline passed, handing the redistricting process over to the Virginia Supreme Court.

Following the rules established by Question 1, the court ordered both Democrats and Republicans to create a list of nominees to be selected as special masters for a map. However, the court threw out 1 of the 3 Republican nominees and ordered a replacement as they found past ties to Republican leadership. Once the Republican list was re-submitted, the court started reviewing both parties' lists again and picked Sean Trende as the Republican nominee and Bernard Grofman as the Democratic nominee. On December 8 the two special masters had announced the completion of the draft map for the House of Representatives. However, following the announcement it came with public backlash over the handling of incumbents, mostly around the new 7th district. Following the public comment period, the map was almost completely redrawn and a revised map was released on December 28. The new map's announcement ended the nearly six-month redistricting process.

Virginia's congressional map, 2023–present

The new court-approved map completely changed every district, with the largest changes being in the 1st, 2nd, 7th, and 10th districts. The first district previously held a significant southern portion of Northern Virginia and was replaced with the western parts of Henrico and Chesterfield counties. These changes made it more Republican. The second district shifted more Republican as it previously held Williamsburg City, York County, eastern portions of Hampton City, and northern parts of Norfolk City. These regions were generally Democratic and were replaced with the southern portions of Chesapeake City, Suffolk City, Isle of Wight County, Franklin City, and eastern parts of Southampton County, which are generally Republican areas. These changes made it less Republican. Unlike the 1st and 2nd districts, the new 7th district was entirely remade. The new district now holds the eastern parts of Prince William County and the entirety of Culpeper, Madison, Greene, Orange, Stafford, King George, Spotsylvania, and Caroline counties. These areas combined are more Democratic than the former Richmond suburbs and rural central Virginia counties which made up the old 7th district. The last major change district was the 10th district, which removed Frederick County, Winchester City, Clarke County, and western parts of Fairfax County. These were replaced by the addition of western Prince William County, Fauquier County, and Rappahannock County. This made the district more Republican.

== Statewide results ==
Party	Candidates	Votes		Seats		
Party	Candidates	No.	%	No.	+/–	%
Democratic Party	11	1,572,296	51.59%	6	▼1	54.55%
Republican Party	11	1,462,049	47.97%	5	▲1	45.45%
Independent	2	7,466	0.24%	0	Steady	0.0%
Write-in	11	5,852	0.19%	0	Steady	0.0%
Total	35	3,047,663	100%	11	Steady	100%

=== District ===
District	Democratic		Republican		Others		Total		Result
District	Votes	%	Votes	%	Votes	%	Votes	%	Result
District 1	147,229	42.96%	191,828	55.97%	3,681	1.07%	342,738	100.00%	Republican hold
District 2	143,219	48.22%	153,328	51.63%	442	0.15%	296,989	100.00%	Republican gain
District 3	139,659	67.19%	67,668	32.56%	516	0.25%	207,843	100.00%	Democratic hold
District 4	159,044	64.92%	85,503	34.90%	425	0.17%	244,972	100.00%	Democratic hold
District 5	129,996	42.24%	177,191	57.57%	588	0.19%	307,775	100.00%	Republican hold
District 6	95,410	35.44%	173,352	64.39%	469	0.17%	269,231	100.00%	Republican hold
District 7	143,357	52.21%	130,586	47.56%	637	0.23%	274,580	100.00%	Democratic hold
District 8	197,760	73.54%	66,589	24.76%	4,581	1.70%	268,930	100.00%	Democratic hold
District 9	66,027	26.54%	182,207	73.24%	555	0.22%	248,789	100.00%	Republican hold
District 10	157,405	53.15%	138,163	46.65%	572	0.19%	296,140	100.00%	Democratic hold
District 11	193,190	66.70%	95,634	33.02%	852	0.29%	289,676	100.00%	Democratic hold
Total	1,572,296	51.59%	1,462,049	47.97%	13,318	0.44%	3,047,663	100.00%	

Statewide popular vote
Democratic	51.59%
Republican	47.97%
Other	0.44%

House seats
Democratic	54.55%
Republican	45.45%

=== County and independent city ===
Locality	Democratic		Republican		Others		Margin		Total
Locality	#	%	#	%	#	%	#	%	Total
Accomack	5,569	42.23%	7,604	57.66%	15	0.11%	-2,035	-15.43%	13,188
Albemarle	33,437	66.61%	16,638	33.14%	126	0.25%	16,799	33.46%	50,201
Alexandria	41,974	77.41%	11,276	20.80%	973	1.79%	30,698	56.61%	54,223
Alleghany	1,347	24.89%	4,057	74.98%	7	0.13%	-2,710	-50.08%	5,411
Amelia	1,393	24.95%	4,187	74.98%	4	0.07%	-2,794	-50.04%	5,584
Amherst	3,536	29.96%	8,250	69.90%	16	0.14%	-4,714	-39.94%	11,802
Appomattox	1,364	20.68%	5,224	79.19%	9	0.14%	-3,860	-58.51%	6,597
Arlington	70,856	77.58%	18,699	20.47%	1,779	1.95%	52,157	57.11%	91,334
Augusta	7,089	23.25%	23,358	76.62%	40	0.13%	-16,269	-53.36%	30,487
Bath	358	21.17%	1,330	78.65%	3	0.18%	-972	-57.48%	1,691
Bedford	7,389	21.93%	26,254	77.93%	45	0.13%	-18,865	-56.00%	33,688
Bland	296	13.30%	1,922	86.38%	7	0.31%	-1,626	-73.08%	2,225
Botetourt	3,568	24.26%	11,118	75.60%	21	0.14%	-7,550	-51.34%	14,707
Bristol	1,259	28.59%	3,130	71.09%	14	0.32%	-1,871	-42.49%	4,403
Brunswick	2,791	53.20%	2,450	46.70%	5	0.10%	341	6.50%	5,246
Buchanan	767	16.16%	3,969	83.65%	9	0.19%	-3,202	-67.48%	4,745
Buckingham	1,869	34.95%	3,472	64.93%	6	0.11%	-1,603	-29.98%	5,347
Buena Vista	466	28.68%	1,153	70.95%	6	0.37%	-687	-42.28%	1,625
Campbell	4,616	23.01%	15,393	76.74%	50	0.25%	-10,777	-53.73%	20,059
Caroline	5,244	45.17%	6,350	54.70%	15	0.13%	-1,106	-9.53%	11,609
Carroll	1,685	16.50%	8,496	83.21%	29	0.28%	-6,811	-66.71%	10,210
Charles City	1,585	55.65%	1,263	44.35%	0	0.00%	322	11.31%	2,848
Charlotte	1,301	30.58%	2,953	69.40%	1	0.02%	-1,652	-38.82%	4,255
Charlottesville	14,581	87.19%	2,100	12.56%	43	0.26%	12,481	74.63%	16,724
Chesapeake	44,335	50.01%	44,062	49.71%	248	0.28%	273	0.31%	88,645
Chesterfield	70,534	50.29%	68,825	49.07%	897	0.64%	1,709	1.22%	140,256
Clarke	2,902	40.42%	4,270	59.48%	7	0.10%	-1,368	-19.06%	7,179
Colonial Heights	1,618	28.66%	4,019	71.20%	8	0.14%	-2,401	-42.53%	5,645
Covington	474	31.90%	1,011	68.03%	1	0.07%	-537	-36.14%	1,486
Craig	350	16.91%	1,715	82.85%	5	0.24%	-1,365	-65.94%	2,070
Culpeper	7,979	39.47%	12,198	60.34%	39	0.19%	-4,219	-20.87%	20,216
Cumberland	1,307	35.12%	2,410	64.75%	5	0.13%	-1,103	-29.63%	3,722
Danville	6,208	53.22%	5,421	46.48%	35	0.30%	787	6.75%	11,664
Dickenson	864	22.17%	3,018	77.44%	15	0.38%	-2,154	-55.27%	3,897
Dinwiddie	3,639	38.16%	5,890	61.77%	6	0.06%	-2,251	-23.61%	9,535
Emporia	840	60.22%	542	38.85%	13	0.93%	298	21.36%	1,395
Essex	1,696	40.19%	2,498	59.19%	26	0.62%	-802	-19.00%	4,220
Fairfax City	6,384	66.22%	3,235	33.55%	24	0.23%	3,151	32.66%	9,641
Fairfax County	271,542	66.77%	132,601	32.61%	2,565	0.63%	138,941	34.16%	406,708
Falls Church	5,134	79.76%	1,193	18.53%	110	1.71%	3,941	61.22%	6,437
Fauquier	12,408	37.42%	20,704	62.44%	45	0.14%	-8,296	-25.02%	33,157
Floyd	2,005	32.20%	4,208	67.58%	14	0.22%	-2,203	-35.38%	6,227
Fluvanna	5,516	46.62%	6,299	53.24%	17	0.14%	-783	-6.62%	11,832
Franklin City	1,730	59.39%	1,179	40.47%	4	0.14%	551	18.92%	2,913
Franklin County	5,131	25.14%	15,259	74.76%	22	0.11%	-10,128	-49.62%	20,412
Frederick	11,302	33.54%	22,317	66.24%	74	0.22%	-11,015	-32.69%	33,693
Fredericksburg	6,082	66.34%	3,066	33.44%	20	0.22%	3,016	32.90%	9,168
Galax	395	24.61%	1,208	75.26%	2	0.12%	-813	-50.65%	1,605
Giles	1,337	23.11%	4,436	76.68%	12	0.21%	-3,099	-53.57%	5,785
Gloucester	4,306	27.86%	10,921	70.65%	231	1.49%	-6,615	-42.79%	15,458
Goochland	5,028	36.55%	8,706	63.29%	22	0.16%	-3,678	-26.74%	13,756
Grayson	985	18.29%	4,393	81.59%	6	0.11%	-3,408	-63.30%	5,384
Greene	3,307	39.20%	5,114	60.62%	15	0.18%	-1,807	-21.42%	8,436
Greensville	1,527	52.06%	1,397	47.63%	9	0.31%	130	4.43%	2,933
Halifax	4,374	36.24%	7,677	63.60%	20	0.17%	-3,303	-27.36%	12,071
Hampton	28,593	70.33%	11,994	29.50%	67	0.16%	16,599	40.83%	40,654
Hanover	17,054	32.84%	34,465	66.36%	418	0.80%	-17,411	-33.52%	51,937
Harrisonburg	6,526	62.94%	3,819	36.83%	23	0.22%	2,707	26.11%	10,368
Henrico	76,319	60.96%	47,987	38.34%	878	0.70%	28,323	22.63%	125,175
Henry	4,486	28.97%	10,984	70.93%	16	0.10%	-6,498	-41.96%	15,486
Highland	297	24.94%	891	74.81%	3	0.25%	-594	-49.87%	1,191
Hopewell	2,692	51.80%	2,493	47.97%	12	0.23%	199	3.83%	5,197
Isle of Wight	7,158	38.62%	11,346	61.22%	29	0.16%	-4,188	-22.60%	18,533
James City	18,090	47.85%	19,342	51.17%	371	0.98%	-1,252	-3.31%	37,803
King and Queen	1,023	34.94%	1,869	63.83%	36	1.23%	-846	-28.89%	2,928
King George	3,913	37.16%	6,590	62.59%	26	0.25%	-2,677	-25.43%	10,529
King William	2,074	27.47%	5,411	71.68%	64	0.85%	-3,337	-44.20%	7,549
Lancaster	2,188	40.10%	3,211	58.84%	58	1.06%	-1,023	-18.75%	5,457
Lee	842	14.87%	4,806	84.85%	16	0.28%	-3,964	-69.99%	5,664
Lexington	1,312	64.92%	700	34.64%	9	0.45%	612	30.28%	2,021
Loudoun	94,116	57.75%	68,505	42.03%	355	0.22%	25,611	15.71%	162,976
Louisa	5,762	35.36%	10,511	64.50%	24	0.15%	-4,749	-29.14%	16,297
Lunenburg	1,440	35.12%	2,658	64.83%	2	0.05%	-1,218	-29.71%	4,100
Lynchburg	10,840	46.29%	12,508	53.41%	71	0.30%	-1,668	-7.12%	23,419
Madison	2,320	35.85%	4,143	64.02%	8	0.12%	-1,823	-28.17%	6,471
Manassas	6,029	56.59%	4,609	43.26%	15	0.14%	1,420	13.33%	10,653
Manassas Park	2,041	60.89%	1,304	38.90%	7	0.21%	737	21.99%	3,352
Martinsville	2,032	55.17%	1,642	44.58%	9	0.24%	390	10.59%	3,683
Mathews	1,239	28.17%	3,065	69.67%	95	2.16%	-1,826	-41.51%	4,399
Mecklenburg	3,869	34.79%	7,236	65.07%	15	0.13%	-3,367	-30.28%	11,120
Middlesex	1,716	33.46%	3,351	65.35%	61	1.19%	-1,635	-31.88%	5,128
Montgomery	14,239	51.09%	13,563	48.67%	67	0.24%	676	2.43%	27,869
Nelson	3,405	47.66%	3,725	52.14%	14	0.20%	-320	-4.48%	7,144
New Kent	3,417	30.86%	7,567	68.35%	87	0.79%	-4,150	-37.49%	11,071
Newport News	31,834	64.05%	17,790	35.79%	81	0.16%	14,044	28.25%	49,705
Norfolk	38,638	71.06%	15,579	28.65%	154	0.28%	23,059	42.41%	54,371
Northampton	2,855	52.54%	2,569	47.28%	10	0.18%	286	5.26%	5,434
Northumberland	2,093	33.85%	4,027	65.13%	63	1.02%	-1,934	-31.28%	6,183
Norton	266	28.36%	666	71.00%	6	0.64%	-400	-42.64%	938
Nottoway	1,713	35.53%	3,103	64.36%	5	0.10%	-1,390	-28.83%	4,821
Orange	6,432	39.81%	9,695	60.01%	28	0.17%	-3,263	-20.20%	16,155
Page	1,847	22.49%	6,360	77.45%	5	0.06%	-4,513	-54.96%	8,212
Patrick	1,065	17.93%	4,864	81.87%	12	0.20%	-3,799	-63.95%	5,941
Petersburg	6,592	86.74%	994	13.08%	14	0.18%	5,598	73.66%	7,600
Pittsylvania	5,994	25.05%	17,896	74.78%	41	0.17%	-11,902	-49.73%	23,931
Poquoson	1,250	22.38%	4,271	76.46%	65	1.16%	-3,021	-54.08%	5,586
Portsmouth	18,770	68.76%	8,484	31.08%	44	0.16%	10,286	37.68%	27,298
Powhatan	3,711	24.85%	11,200	75.01%	20	0.13%	-7,489	-50.16%	14,931
Prince Edward	2,918	45.78%	3,445	54.05%	11	0.17%	-527	-8.27%	6,374
Prince George	4,163	37.26%	6,994	62.60%	15	0.13%	-2,831	-25.34%	11,172
Prince William	90,113	59.45%	61,151	40.34%	324	0.21%	28,962	19.11%	151,588
Pulaski	2,768	25.49%	8,065	74.27%	26	0.24%	-5,297	-48.78%	10,859
Radford	1,744	46.38%	2,006	53.35%	10	0.27%	-262	-6.97%	3,760
Rappahannock	1,722	42.40%	2,329	57.35%	10	0.25%	-607	-14.95%	4,061
Richmond City	57,568	83.02%	11,625	16.76%	150	0.22%	45,943	66.25%	69,343
Richmond County	764	27.40%	2,005	71.92%	19	0.68%	-1,241	-44.51%	2,788
Roanoke City	15,482	58.82%	10,780	40.96%	58	0.22%	4,702	17.86%	26,320
Roanoke County	13,036	34.85%	24,286	64.93%	82	0.22%	-11,250	-30.08%	37,404
Rockbridge	2,964	32.86%	6,037	66.94%	18	0.20%	-3,073	-34.07%	9,019
Rockingham	8,392	26.61%	23,093	73.23%	50	0.16%	-14,701	-46.62%	31,535
Russell	1,337	17.08%	6,471	82.65%	21	0.27%	-5,134	-65.58%	7,829
Salem	3,040	36.45%	5,283	63.34%	18	0.22%	-2,243	-26.89%	8,341
Scott	928	14.18%	5,607	85.69%	8	0.12%	-4,679	-71.51%	6,543
Shenandoah	4,387	27.13%	11,766	72.76%	19	0.12%	-7,379	-45.63%	16,172
Smyth	1,496	17.69%	6,935	82.00%	26	0.31%	-5,439	-64.31%	8,457
Southampton	2,666	35.98%	4,736	63.92%	7	0.09%	-2,070	-27.94%	7,409
Spotsylvania	25,424	46.26%	29,390	53.48%	140	0.25%	-3,966	-7.22%	54,954
Stafford	28,685	49.77%	28,806	49.98%	144	0.25%	-121	-0.21%	57,635
Staunton	5,081	55.65%	4,033	44.17%	17	0.19%	1,048	11.48%	9,131
Suffolk	20,475	55.64%	16,265	44.20%	56	0.15%	4,210	11.44%	36,796
Surry	1,659	49.97%	1,654	49.82%	7	0.21%	5	0.15%	3,320
Sussex	1,689	49.27%	1,728	50.41%	11	0.32%	-39	-1.14%	3,428
Tazewell	1,635	14.17%	9,876	85.60%	27	0.23%	-8,241	-71.42%	11,538
Virginia Beach	81,421	50.05%	81,016	49.80%	245	0.15%	405	0.25%	162,682
Warren	4,253	29.85%	9,965	69.94%	30	0.21%	-5,712	-40.09%	14,248
Washington	4,047	22.52%	13,870	77.18%	53	0.29%	-9,823	-54.66%	17,970
Waynesboro	3,264	45.31%	3,926	54.50%	14	0.19%	-662	-9.19%	7,204
Westmoreland	2,642	37.46%	4,333	61.43%	78	1.11%	-1,691	-23.98%	7,053
Williamsburg	3,352	65.79%	1,656	32.50%	87	1.71%	1,696	33.29%	5,095
Winchester	4,263	53.99%	3,621	45.86%	12	0.15%	642	8.13%	7,896
Wise	1,783	19.14%	7,506	80.58%	26	0.28%	-5,723	-61.44%	9,315
Wythe	1,824	19.22%	7,645	80.55%	22	0.23%	-5,821	-61.33%	9,491
York	11,640	41.74%	15,914	57.07%	333	1.19%	-4,274	-15.33%	27,887
Totals	1,572,296	51.59%	1,462,049	47.97%	13,318	0.44%	110,247	3.62%	3,047,663

== District 1 ==
2022 Virginia's 1st congressional district election
- November 8, 2022
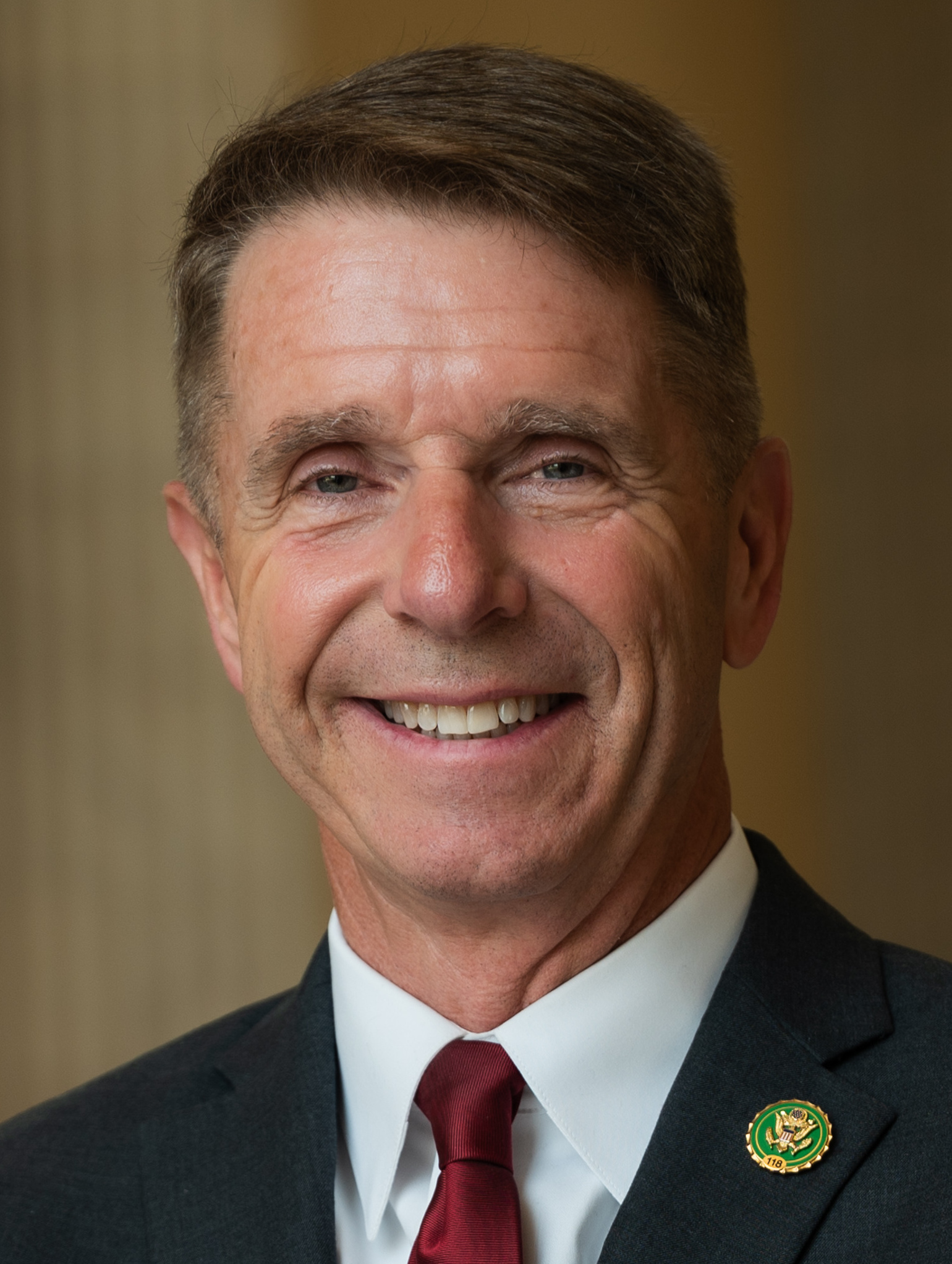

Nominee	Rob Wittman	Herb Jones
Party	Republican	Democratic
Popular vote	191,828	147,229
Percentage	56.0%	43.0%
- County and independent city results Wittman: 50–60% 60–70% 70–80% Jones: 50–60% 60–70%
U.S. Representative before election
Rob Wittman
Republican
Elected U.S. Representative
Rob Wittman
Republican

The 1st district is based in the western Chesapeake Bay and includes portions of suburban Richmond. Within the district are western Henrico and Chesterfield counties. Other localities in the district include Colonial Beach, Mechanicsville, and Williamsburg. The incumbent was Republican Rob Wittman, who was re-elected with 58.2% of the vote in 2020. On November 8, 2022, Congressman Wittman was re-elected.

=== Republican primary ===
==== Candidates ====
===== Nominee =====
- Rob Wittman, incumbent U.S. representative

===== Declined =====
- Amanda Chase, state senator, and candidate for governor in 2021(redistricted from Virginia's 7th congressional district)

=== Democratic primary ===
==== Nominee ====
- Herb Jones, U.S. Army veteran and Democratic nominee for SD-03 in 2019

===== Withdrew =====
- Stewart Navarre, U.S. Marine Corps veteran

=== Independents ===
==== Candidates ====
- David Foster, U.S. Navy veteran

=== General election ===
==== Predictions ====
Source	Ranking	As of
The Cook Political Report	Solid R	December 28, 2021
Inside Elections	Solid R	February 8, 2022
Sabato's Crystal Ball	Safe R	January 4, 2022
Politico	Likely R	April 5, 2022
RCP	Safe R	June 9, 2022
Fox News	Solid R	July 11, 2022
DDHQ	Solid R	July 20, 2022
538	Solid R	June 30, 2022
The Economist	Safe R	September 28, 2022

==== Endorsements ====
Herb Jones (D)

Organizations

- Sierra Club

==== Results ====
2022 Virginia's 1st congressional district election
Party	Candidate	Votes	%
Republican	Rob Wittman (incumbent)	191,828	56.0
Democratic	Herb Jones	147,229	43.0
Independent	David Foster	3,388	1.0
Write-in		293	0.1
Total votes		342,738	100.0
Republican hold			

==== By county and independent city ====
Locality	Rob Wittman Republican		Herb Jones Democratic		Various candidates Other parties		Margin		Total votes cast
Locality	#	%	#	%	#	%	#	%	Total votes cast
Chesterfield (part)	39,866	52.27%	35,601	46.68%	806	1.06%	4,265	5.59%	76,273
Essex	2,498	59.19%	1,696	40.19%	26	0.62%	802	19.00%	4,220
Gloucester	10,921	70.65%	4,306	27.86%	231	1.49%	6,615	42.79%	15,458
Hanover (part)	28,401	65.73%	14,401	33.33%	405	0.94%	14,000	32.40%	43,207
Henrico (part)	34,120	45.70%	39,737	53.23%	796	1.07%	-5,617	-7.52%	74,653
James City	19,342	51.17%	18,090	47.85%	371	0.98%	1,252	3.31%	37,803
King and Queen	1,869	63.83%	1,023	34.94%	36	1.23%	846	28.89%	2,928
King William	5,411	71.68%	2,074	27.47%	64	0.85%	3,337	44.20%	7,549
Lancaster	3,211	58.84%	2,188	40.10%	58	1.06%	1,023	18.75%	5,457
Mathews	3,065	69.67%	1,239	28.17%	95	2.16%	1,826	41.51%	4,399
Middlesex	3,351	65.35%	1,716	33.46%	61	1.19%	1,635	31.88%	5,128
New Kent	7,567	68.35%	3,417	30.86%	87	0.79%	4,150	37.49%	11,071
Northumberland	4,027	65.13%	2,093	33.85%	63	1.02%	1,934	31.28%	6,183
Poquoson	4,271	76.46%	1,250	22.38%	65	1.16%	3,021	54.08%	5,586
Richmond County	2,005	71.92%	764	27.40%	19	0.68%	1,241	44.51%	2,788
Westmoreland	4,333	61.43%	2,642	37.46%	78	1.11%	1,691	23.98%	7,053
Williamsburg	1,656	32.50%	3,352	65.79%	87	1.71%	-1,696	-33.29%	5,095
York	15,914	57.07%	11,640	41.74%	333	1.19%	4,274	15.33%	27,887
Totals	191,828	55.97%	147,229	42.96%	3,681	1.07%	44,599	13.01%	342,738

== District 2 ==
2022 Virginia's 2nd congressional district election
- November 8, 2022
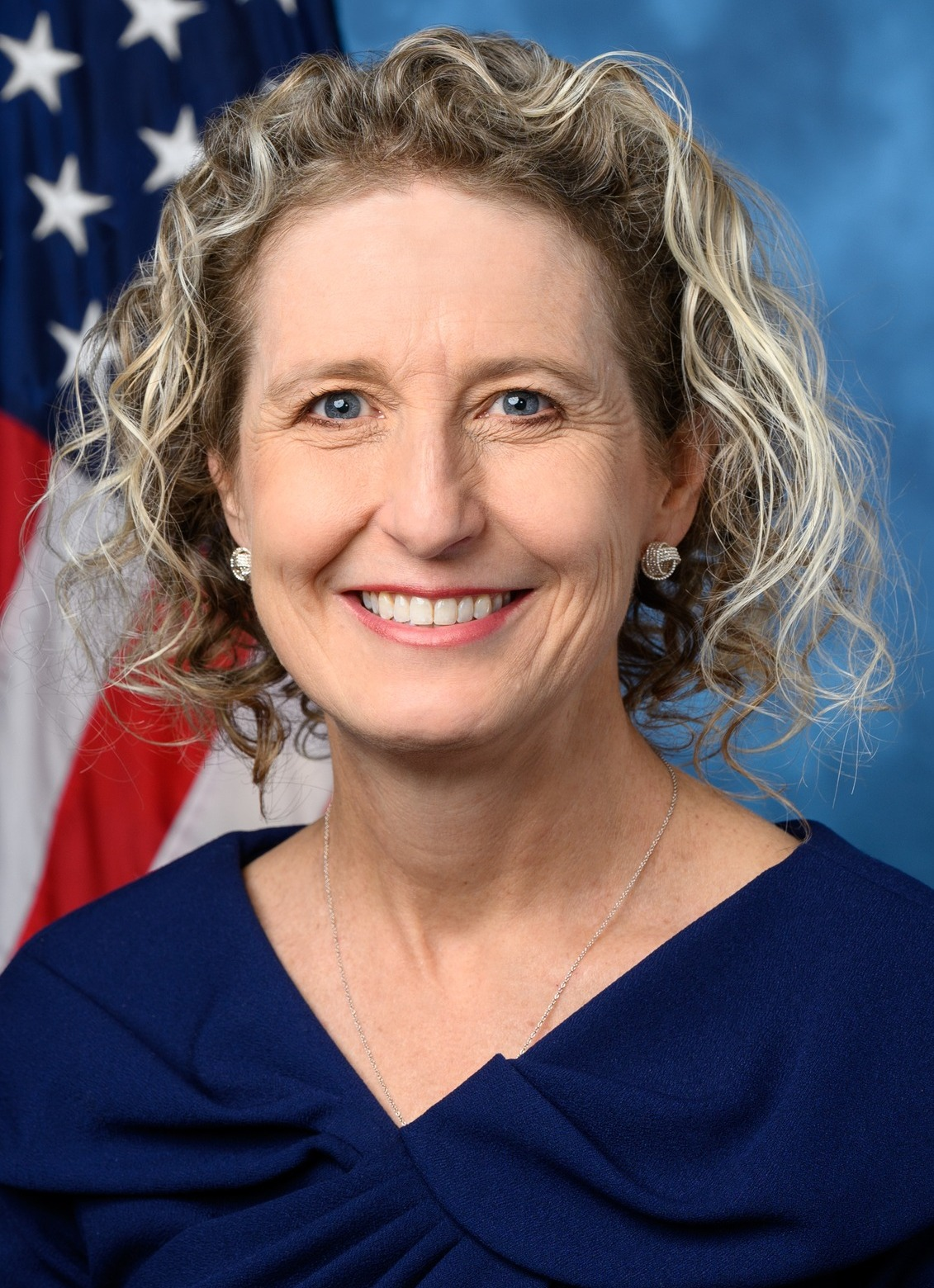

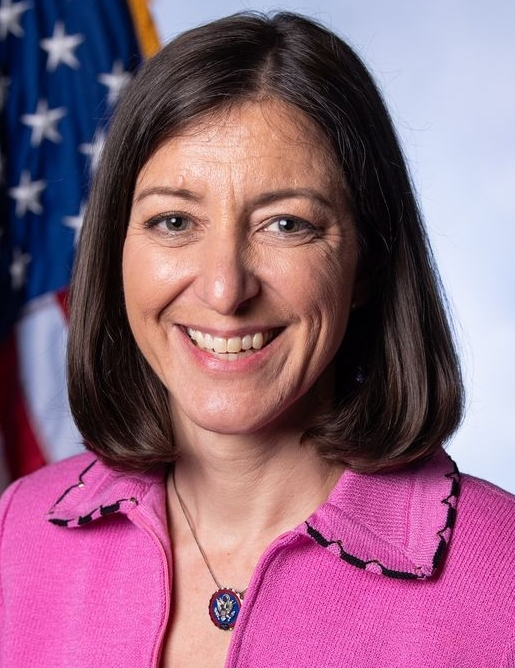
Nominee	Jen Kiggans	Elaine Luria
Party	Republican	Democratic
Popular vote	153,328	143,219
Percentage	51.6%	48.2%
- County and independent city results Kiggans: 50–60% 60–70% Luria: 50–60%
U.S. Representative before election
Elaine Luria
Democratic
Elected U.S. Representative
Jen Kiggans
Republican

The 2nd district is based in Hampton Roads, containing the cities of Chesapeake, Franklin, Suffolk, and Virginia Beach. Virginia's Eastern Shore is also located within the district. The incumbent was Democrat Elaine Luria, who was re-elected with 51.6% of the vote in 2020. Despite her home in Norfolk no longer being in the district, Luria ran for re-election in this seat. On November 8, 2022, State Senator Jen Kiggans won the election to the district, unseating Luria.

=== Democratic primary ===
==== Candidates ====
===== Nominee =====
- Elaine Luria, incumbent U.S. representative

==== Withdrawn ====
- Neil Smith, U.S. Navy veteran

=== Republican primary ===
==== Candidates ====
===== Nominee =====
- Jen Kiggans, state senator from SD-7, nurse practitioner, and U.S. Navy veteran

===== Eliminated in primary =====
- Tommy Altman, U.S. Air Force veteran
- Andy Baan, U.S. Navy veteran
- Jarome Bell, U.S. Navy veteran, and candidate for Virginia's 2nd congressional district in 2020

==== Endorsements ====
Jarome Bell

Federal executive branch officials

- Michael Flynn, 25th United States National Security Advisor (2017)

U.S. representatives

- Bob Good, U.S. representative for Virginia's 5th congressional district (2021–present)
- Paul Gosar, U.S. representative for Arizona's 4th congressional district (2011–present)

State senators

- Wendy Rogers, state senator for Arizona's 6th legislative district (2021–present)

==== Polling ====
Poll source	Date(s) administered	Sample size (Note: Key: A – all adults RV – registered voters LV – likely voters V – unclear)	Margin of error	Tommy Altman	Jarome Bell	Jen Kiggans	Undecided
Basswood Research (R) (Note: This poll was sponsored by Winning for Women Action Fund, which supports Kiggans.)	May 24–26, 2022	400 (LV)	± 4.9%	9%	8%	43%	40%

=== Results ===
County and independent city results Kiggans: 40–50%; 50–60%; 60–70%; Bell: 50–60%

Republican primary results
Party	Candidate	Votes	%
Republican	Jen Kiggans	23,300	55.7
Republican	Jarome Bell	11,330	27.1
Republican	Tommy Altman	5,972	14.3
Republican	Andy Baan	1,237	3.0
Total votes		41,839	100.0

=== General election ===
==== Failed to qualify ====
- Garry Hubbard (Green), former candidate for Virginia Beach City Council

==== Debates ====
2022 Virginia's 2nd congressional district debates
No.	Date	Host	Moderator	Link	Democratic	Republican
Key: P Participant A Absent N Not invited I Invited W Withdrawn						
Key: P Participant A Absent N Not invited I Invited W Withdrawn					Elaine Luria	Jen Kiggans
1	Oct. 12, 2022	Hampton Roads; Chamber of Commerce; WTKR-TV			P	P
2	Oct. 17, 2022		Herb De Groft; Steve Stewart		P	P
3	Oct. 26, 2022	WTKR	Barbara Ciara		P	P

==== Endorsements ====
Elaine Luria (D)

Organizations

- 314 Action
- American Israel Public Affairs Committee
- EMILY's List
- Feminist Majority PAC
- Giffords
- Humane Society of the United States Legislative Fund
- Jewish Democratic Council of America
- League of Conservation Voters
- NARAL Pro-Choice America
- Natural Resources Defense Council
- New Politics
- Planned Parenthood Action Fund
- Pro-Israel America
- Renew America Movement
- Sierra Club
- VoteVets.org
Jen Kiggans (R)

U.S. representatives

- Harriet Hageman, U.S. representative for Wyoming's at-large congressional district (2023–present)
- Elise Stefanik, U.S. representative for New York's 21st congressional district (2015–present)
- Scott Taylor, former U.S. representative for Virginia's 2nd congressional district (2017–2019)

Governors

- Winsome Earle-Sears, 42nd lieutenant governor of Virginia (2022–present)
- Glenn Youngkin, 74th governor of Virginia (2022–present)

Organizations

- Congressional Leadership Fund
- Maggie's List

==== Predictions ====
Source	Ranking	As of
The Cook Political Report	Tossup	December 28, 2021
Inside Elections	Tilt R (flip)	November 3, 2022
Sabato's Crystal Ball	Lean R (flip)	November 7, 2022
Politico	Tossup	April 5, 2022
RCP	Lean R (flip)	June 9, 2022
Fox News	Lean R (flip)	November 1, 2022
DDHQ	Tossup	October 21, 2022
538	Tossup	August 5, 2022
The Economist	Tossup	September 28, 2022

==== Polling ====
Poll source	Date(s) administered	Sample size	Margin of error	Elaine Luria (D)	Jen Kiggans (R)	Other	Undecided
Christopher Newport University	October 12–18, 2022	820 (LV)	± 3.9%	45%	45%	1%	8%
Slingshot Strategies (D)	April 10–15, 2022	600 (RV)	± 4.0%	39%	34%	4%	20%

Hypothetical polling

Elaine Luria vs. Jarome Bell

Poll source	Date(s) administered	Sample size	Margin of error	Elaine Luria (D)	Jarome Bell (R)	Other	Undecided
Slingshot Strategies (D)	April 10–15, 2022	600 (RV)	± 4.0%	38%	33%	4%	20%

Generic Democrat vs. generic Republican

Poll source	Date(s) administered	Sample size	Margin of error	Generic Democrat	Generic Republican	Other	Undecided
Slingshot Strategies (D)	April 10–15, 2022	600 (RV)	± 4.0%	40%	42%	3%	13%

==== Results ====
2022 Virginia's 2nd congressional district election
Party	Candidate	Votes	%
Republican	Jen Kiggans	153,328	51.6
Democratic	Elaine Luria (incumbent)	143,219	48.2
Write-in		442	0.1
Total votes		296,989	100.0
Republican gain from Democratic			

==== By county and independent city ====
Locality	Elaine Luria Democratic		Jen Kiggans Republican		Write-in Various		Margin		Total votes cast
Locality	#	%	#	%	#	%	#	%	Total votes cast
Accomack	5,569	42.23%	7,604	57.66%	15	0.11%	2,035	15.43%	13,188
Chesapeake (part)	22,511	42.61%	30,241	57.24%	78	0.15%	7,730	14.63%	52,830
Franklin City	1,730	59.39%	1,179	40.47%	4	0.14%	-551	-18.92%	2,913
Isle of Wight	7,158	38.62%	11,346	61.22%	29	0.16%	4,188	22.60%	18,533
Northampton	2,855	52.54%	2,569	47.28%	10	0.18%	-286	-5.26%	5,434
Southampton (part)	1,500	32.52%	3,108	67.37%	5	0.11%	1,608	34.86%	4,613
Suffolk	20,475	55.64%	16,265	44.20%	56	0.15%	-4,210	-11.44%	36,796
Virginia Beach	81,421	50.05%	81,016	49.80%	245	0.15%	-405	-0.25%	162,682
Totals	143,219	48.22%	153,328	51.63%	442	0.15%	10,109	3.40%	296,989

== District 3 ==
2022 Virginia's 3rd congressional district election
- November 8, 2022
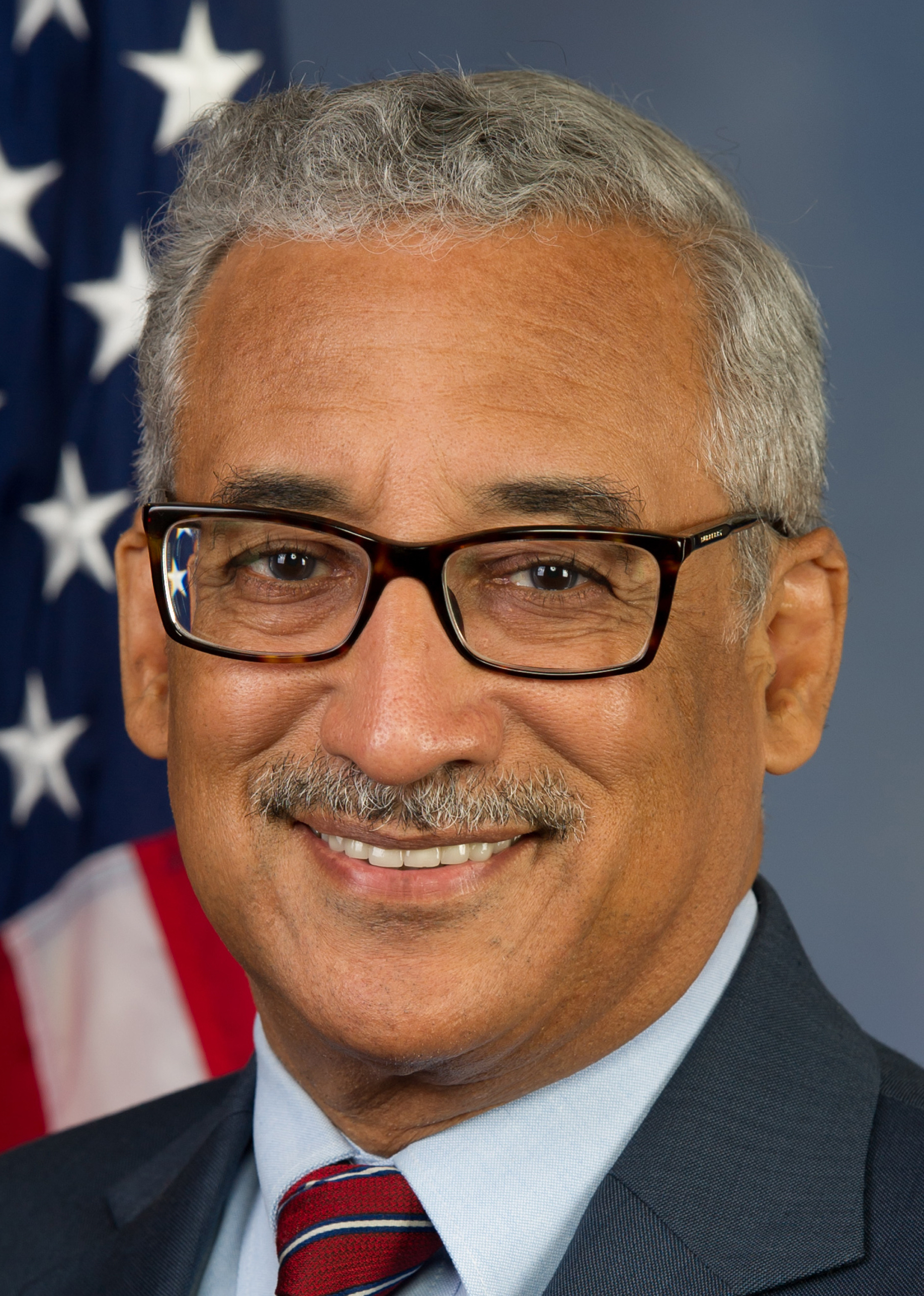

Nominee	Bobby Scott	Terry Namkung
Party	Democratic	Republican
Popular vote	139,659	67,668
Percentage	67.2%	32.6%
- County and independent city results Scott: 60–70% 70–80%
U.S. Representative before election
Bobby Scott
Democratic
Elected U.S. Representative
Bobby Scott
Democratic

The 3rd district encompasses the inner Hampton Roads, including parts of Hampton and Norfolk, as well as Newport News. The incumbent was Democrat Bobby Scott, who was reelected with 68.4% of the vote in 2020. On November 8, 2022, Congressman Scott was re-elected.

=== Democratic primary ===
==== Nominee ====
- Bobby Scott, incumbent U.S. representative

==== Failed to qualify ====
- Luis Rivera, entrepreneur

=== Republican primary ===
==== Candidates ====
===== Nominee =====
- Terry Namkung, U.S. Air Force veteran

===== Eliminated in primary =====
- Theodore "Ted" Engquist, minister

==== Failed to qualify ====
- Madison Downs, teacher and Republican candidate for VA-03 in 2020

=== Results ===
Republican primary results
Party	Candidate	Votes	%
Republican	Terry Namkung	6,293	60.5
Republican	Theodore "Ted" Engquist	4,116	39.5
Total votes		10,409	100.0

=== General election ===
==== Predictions ====
Source	Ranking	As of
The Cook Political Report	Solid D	December 28, 2021
Inside Elections	Solid D	February 8, 2022
Sabato's Crystal Ball	Safe D	January 4, 2022
Politico	Solid D	April 5, 2022
RCP	Safe D	June 9, 2022
Fox News	Solid D	July 11, 2022
DDHQ	Solid D	July 20, 2022
538	Solid D	June 30, 2022
The Economist	Safe D	September 28, 2022

==== Endorsements ====
Bobby Scott (D)

Organizations

- Sierra Club

==== Results ====
2022 Virginia's 3rd congressional district election
Party	Candidate	Votes	%
Democratic	Bobby Scott (incumbent)	139,659	67.2
Republican	Terry Namkung	67,668	32.6
Write-in		516	0.2
Total votes		207,843	100.0
Democratic hold			

==== By county and independent city ====
Locality	Bobby Scott Democratic		Terry Namkung Republican		Write-in Various		Margin		Total votes cast
Locality	#	%	#	%	#	%	#	%	Total votes cast
Chesapeake (part)	21,824	60.94%	13,821	38.59%	170	0.47%	8,003	22.35%	35,815
Hampton	28,593	70.33%	11,994	29.50%	67	0.16%	16,599	40.83%	40,654
Newport News	31,834	64.05%	17,790	35.79%	81	0.16%	14,044	28.25%	49,705
Norfolk	38,638	71.06%	15,579	28.65%	154	0.28%	23,059	42.41%	54,371
Portsmouth	18,770	68.76%	8,484	31.08%	44	0.16%	10,286	37.68%	27,298
Totals	139,659	67.19%	67,668	32.56%	516	0.25%	71,991	34.64%	207,843

== District 4 ==
2022 Virginia's 4th congressional district election
- November 8, 2022
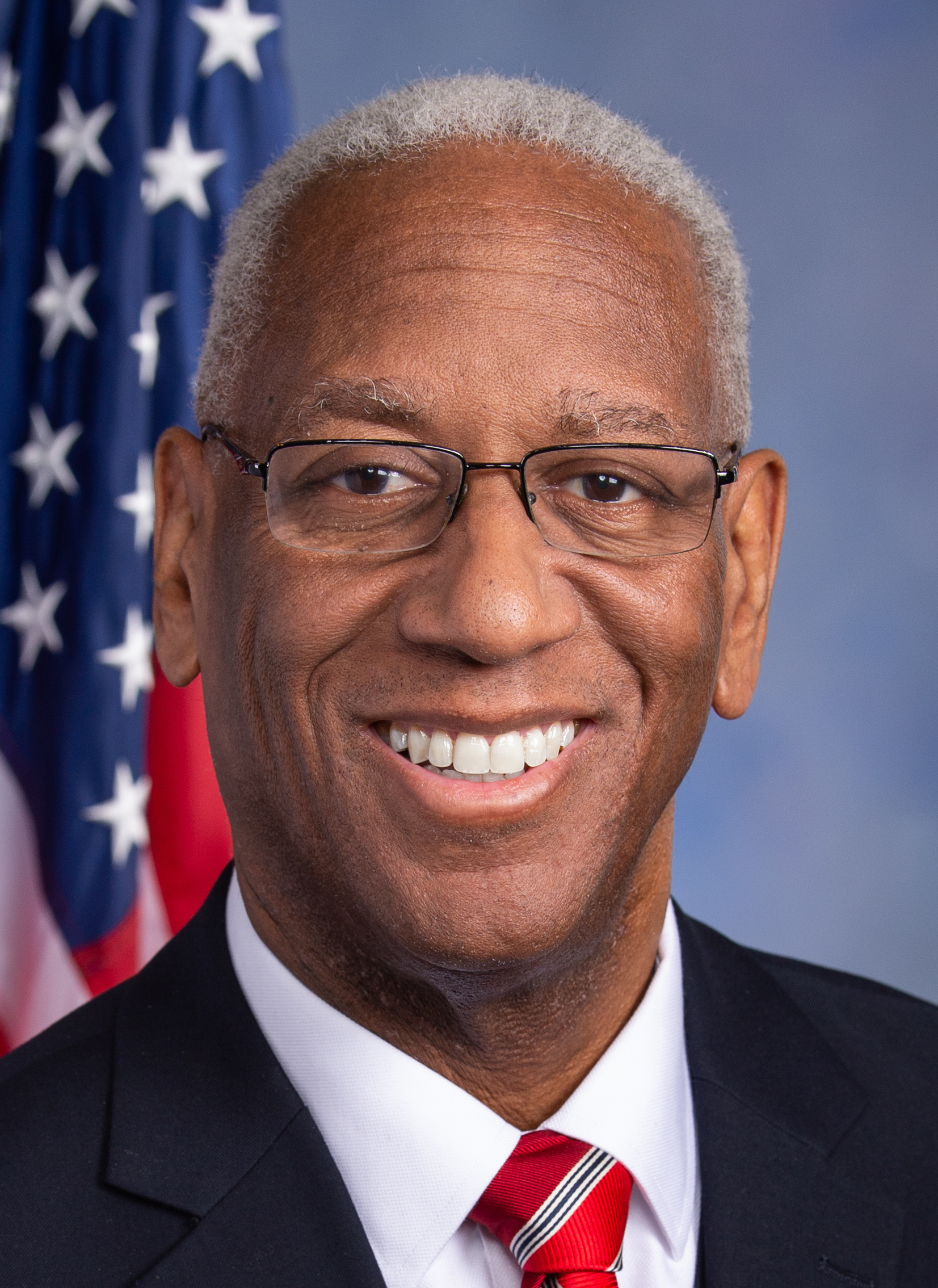

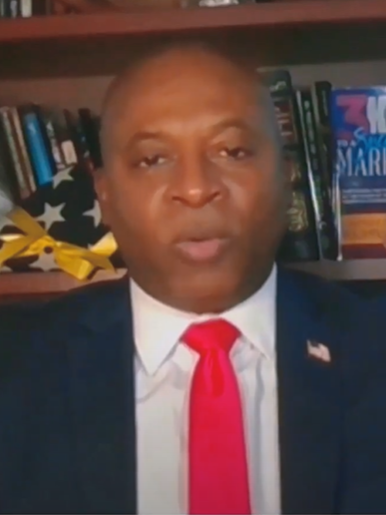
Nominee	Donald McEachin	Leon Benjamin
Party	Democratic	Republican
Popular vote	159,044	85,503
Percentage	64.9%	34.9%
- County and independent city results McEachin: 40–50% 50–60% 60–70% 70–80% 80–90% Benjamin: 50–60% 60–70% 70–80%
U.S. Representative before election
Donald McEachin
Democratic
Elected U.S. Representative
Donald McEachin
(died after re-elected)
Democratic

The 4th district takes in the city of Richmond and portions of Southside Virginia following Interstate 95. Within the district are the cities of Colonial Heights, Emporia, Hopewell, and Petersburg. The incumbent was Donald McEachin, who was re-elected with 61.6% of the vote in 2020.

On November 8, 2022, McEachin was re-elected; however, he died on November 28. A special election was held on February 21, 2023, with fellow Democrat Jennifer McClellan elected to succeed him.

=== Democratic primary ===
==== Candidates ====
===== Nominee =====
- Donald McEachin, incumbent U.S. representative

=== Republican primary ===
==== Candidates ====
===== Nominee =====
- Leon Benjamin, pastor, U.S. Navy veteran, and nominee for this seat in 2020

==== Failed to qualify ====
- Mike Dickinson, strip club owner and perennial candidate

=== General election ===
==== Predictions ====
Source	Ranking	As of
The Cook Political Report	Solid D	December 28, 2021
Inside Elections	Solid D	February 8, 2022
Sabato's Crystal Ball	Safe D	January 4, 2022
Politico	Solid D	April 5, 2022
RCP	Safe D	June 9, 2022
Fox News	Solid D	July 11, 2022
DDHQ	Solid D	July 20, 2022
538	Solid D	June 30, 2022
The Economist	Safe D	September 28, 2022

==== Endorsements ====
Donald McEachin (D)

Organizations

- League of Conservation Voters
- Sierra Club

==== Results ====
2022 Virginia's 4th congressional district election
Party	Candidate	Votes	%
Democratic	Donald McEachin (incumbent)	159,044	64.9
Republican	Leon Benjamin	85,503	34.9
Write-in		425	0.2
Total votes		244,972	100.0
Democratic hold			

==== By county and independent city ====
Locality	Donald McEachin Democratic		Leon Benjamin Republican		Write-in Various		Margin		Total votes cast
Locality	#	%	#	%	#	%	#	%	Total votes cast
Brunswick	2,791	53.20%	2,450	46.70%	5	0.10%	341	6.50%	5,246
Charles City	1,585	55.65%	1,263	44.35%	0	0.00%	322	11.31%	2,848
Chesterfield (part)	34,933	54.60%	28,959	45.26%	91	0.14%	5,974	9.34%	63,983
Colonial Heights	1,618	28.66%	4,019	71.20%	8	0.14%	-2,401	-42.53%	5,645
Dinwiddie	3,639	38.16%	5,890	61.77%	6	0.06%	-2,251	-23.61%	9,535
Emporia	840	60.22%	542	38.85%	13	0.93%	298	21.36%	1,395
Greensville	1,527	52.06%	1,397	47.63%	9	0.31%	130	4.43%	2,933
Henrico (part)	36,582	72.40%	13,867	27.44%	82	0.16%	22,715	44.95%	50,531
Hopewell	2,692	51.80%	2,493	47.97%	12	0.23%	199	3.83%	5,197
Petersburg	6,592	86.74%	994	13.08%	14	0.18%	5,598	73.66%	7,600
Prince George	4,163	37.26%	6,994	62.60%	15	0.13%	-2,831	-25.34%	11,172
Richmond City	57,568	83.02%	11,625	16.76%	150	0.22%	45,943	66.25%	69,343
Southampton (part)	1,166	41.70%	1,628	58.23%	2	0.07%	-462	-16.52%	2,796
Surry	1,659	49.97%	1,654	49.82%	7	0.21%	5	0.15%	3,320
Sussex	1,689	49.27%	1,728	50.41%	11	0.32%	-39	-1.14%	3,428
Totals	159,044	64.92%	85,503	34.90%	425	0.17%	73,541	30.02%	244,972

== District 5 ==
2022 Virginia's 5th congressional district election
- November 8, 2022
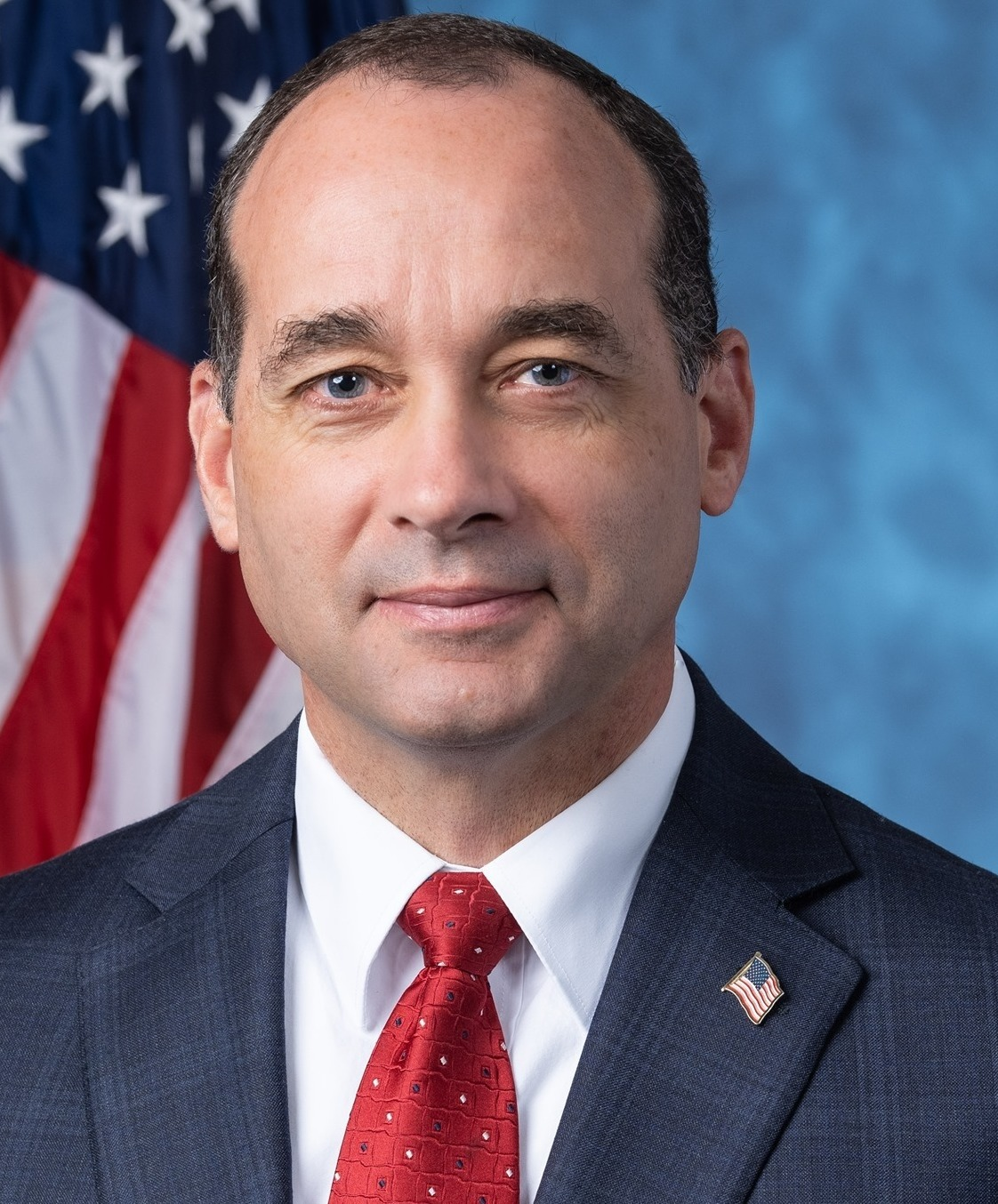

Nominee	Bob Good	Josh Throneburg
Party	Republican	Democratic
Popular vote	177,191	129,996
Percentage	57.6%	42.2%
- County and independent city results Good: 50–60% 60–70% 70–80% Throneburg: 50–60% 60–70% 80–90%
U.S. Representative before election
Bob Good
Republican
Elected U.S. Representative
Bob Good
Republican

The 5th district includes the majority of Southside Virginia. Within the district are the cities of Charlottesville, Danville, and Lynchburg. The incumbent representative is Bob Good, who was elected with 52.4% of the vote in 2020, after ousting then Representative Denver Riggleman in the Republican convention. On November 8, 2022, Congressman Bob Good was re-elected.

=== Republican convention ===
==== Nominee ====
- Bob Good, incumbent U.S. representative

===== Eliminated at convention =====
- Dan Moy, U.S. Air Force veteran and Charlottesville GOP Chair

==== Withdrawn ====
- Kimberly Lowe, farmer and activist (running in 9th)

==== Endorsements ====
Bob Good

Organizations

- Family Research Council Action PAC

=== Results ===
Republican convention results
Party	Candidate	Votes	%
Republican	Bob Good (incumbent)	1,488	84.6
Republican	Dan Moy	271	15.4
Total votes		1,759	100.0

=== Democratic primary ===
==== Candidates ====
===== Nominee =====
- Josh Throneburg, business owner

==== Failed to qualify ====
- Warren McClellan, farmer
- Andy Parker, former Henry County supervisor and father of Alison Parker

==== Withdrawn ====
- Shadi Ayyas, physician (running in 10th)
- Lewis Combs, prosecutor

=== General election ===
==== Predictions ====
Source	Ranking	As of
The Cook Political Report	Solid R	December 28, 2021
Inside Elections	Solid R	February 8, 2022
Sabato's Crystal Ball	Safe R	January 4, 2022
Politico	Likely R	April 5, 2022
RCP	Safe R	June 9, 2022
Fox News	Solid R	July 11, 2022
DDHQ	Solid R	July 20, 2022
538	Solid R	June 30, 2022
The Economist	Safe R	September 28, 2022

==== Post-primary endorsements ====
Bob Good (R)

Federal officials

- Donald Trump, 45th president of the United States (2017–2021)

State officials

- Rob Bell, delegate for Virginia's 58th House of Delegates district (2002–present)
- Kathy Byron, delegate for Virginia's 22nd House of Delegates district (1998–present)
- Matt Fariss, delegate for Virginia's 59th House of Delegates district (2012–present)
- Nick Freitas, delegate for Virginia's 30th House of Delegates district (2016–present) and Republican nominee for Congress in Virginia's 7th congressional district in 2020
- Bill Stanley, state senator for Virginia's 20th Senate district (2012–present)
- Glenn Youngkin, 74th governor of Virginia (2021–present)

U.S. representatives

- Andy Biggs, U.S. representative for Arizona's 6th congressional district (2017–present)
- Ben Cline, U.S. representative for Virginia's 6th congressional district (2019–present)
- Jody Hice, U.S. representative from Georgia's 10th congressional district (2015–present)
- Thomas Massie, U.S. representative from Kentucky's 4th congressional district (2012–present)
- Scott Perry, U.S. representative from Pennsylvania's 10th congressional district (2013–present)
- Chip Roy, U.S. representative for Texas's 21st congressional district (2019–present)

Organizations

- Eagle Forum, conservative interest group
- Home School Legal Defense Association
Josh Throneburg (D)

Federal officials

- Tim Kaine, U.S. senator from Virginia (2013–present)
- Donald McEachin, U.S. representative for Virginia's 4th congressional district (2017–22)
- Tom Perriello, former U.S. representative for Virginia's 5th congressional district (2009–11)
- Abigail Spanberger, U.S. representative for Virginia's 7th congressional district (2019–present)
- Mark Warner, U.S. senator from Virginia (2009–present)

State officials

- Joshua Cole, former delegate for Virginia's 28th House of Delegates district (2020–22)
- Creigh Deeds, state senator for Virginia's 25th Senate district (2001–present)
- Elizabeth Guzmán, delegate for Virginia's 31st House of Delegates district (2018–present)
- Ghazala Hashmi, state senator for Virginia's 10th Senate district (2020–present)
- Sally Hudson, delegate for Virginia's 57th House of Delegates district (2020–present)
- L. Louise Lucas, president pro tempore of the Virginia Senate (2020–present) and state senator for Virginia's 18th Senate district (1992–present)

Local officials

- Levar Stoney, mayor of Richmond (2017–present)

Organizations

- Alliance for Retired Americans
- Sierra Club

==== Results ====
2022 Virginia's 5th congressional district election
Party	Candidate	Votes	%
Republican	Bob Good (incumbent)	177,191	57.6
Democratic	Josh Throneburg	129,996	42.2
Write-in		588	0.2
Total votes		307,775	100.0
Republican hold			

==== By county and independent city ====
Locality	Bob Good Republican		Josh Throneburg Democratic		Write-in Various		Margin		Total votes cast
Locality	#	%	#	%	#	%	#	%	Total votes cast
Albemarle (part)	16,624	33.13%	33,430	66.62%	126	0.25%	-16,806	-33.49%	50,180
Amelia	4,187	74.98%	1,393	24.95%	4	0.07%	2,794	50.04%	5,584
Amherst	8,250	69.90%	3,536	29.96%	16	0.14%	4,714	39.94%	11,802
Appomattox	5,224	79.19%	1,364	20.68%	9	0.14%	3,860	58.51%	6,597
Bedford (part)	10,129	76.07%	3,168	23.79%	18	0.14%	6,961	52.28%	13,315
Buckingham	3,472	64.93%	1,869	34.95%	6	0.11%	1,603	29.98%	5,347
Campbell	15,393	76.74%	4,616	23.01%	50	0.25%	10,777	53.73%	20,059
Charlotte	2,953	69.40%	1,301	30.58%	1	0.02%	1,652	38.82%	4,255
Charlottesville	2,100	12.56%	14,581	87.19%	43	0.26%	-12,481	-74.63%	16,724
Cumberland	2,410	64.75%	1,307	35.12%	5	0.13%	1,103	29.63%	3,722
Danville	5,421	46.48%	6,208	53.22%	35	0.30%	-787	-6.75%	11,664
Fluvanna	6,299	53.24%	5,516	46.62%	17	0.14%	783	6.62%	11,832
Goochland	8,706	63.29%	5,028	36.55%	22	0.16%	3,678	26.74%	13,756
Halifax	7,677	63.60%	4,374	36.24%	20	0.17%	3,303	27.36%	12,071
Hanover (part)	6,064	69.46%	2,653	30.39%	13	0.15%	3,411	39.07%	8,730
Louisa	10,511	64.50%	5,762	35.36%	24	0.15%	4,749	29.14%	16,297
Lunenburg	2,658	64.83%	1,440	35.12%	2	0.05%	1,218	29.71%	4,100
Lynchburg	12,508	53.41%	10,840	46.29%	71	0.30%	1,668	7.12%	23,419
Mecklenburg	7,236	65.07%	3,869	34.79%	15	0.13%	3,367	30.28%	11,120
Nelson	3,725	52.14%	3,405	47.66%	14	0.20%	320	4.48%	7,144
Nottoway	3,103	64.36%	1,713	35.53%	5	0.10%	1,390	28.83%	4,821
Pittsylvania	17,896	74.78%	5,994	25.05%	41	0.17%	11,902	49.73%	23,931
Powhatan	11,200	75.01%	3,711	24.85%	20	0.13%	7,489	50.16%	14,931
Prince Edward	3,445	54.05%	2,918	45.78%	11	0.17%	527	8.27%	6,374
Totals	177,191	57.57%	129,996	42.24%	588	0.19%	47,195	15.33%	307,775

== District 6 ==
2022 Virginia's 6th congressional district election
- November 8, 2022
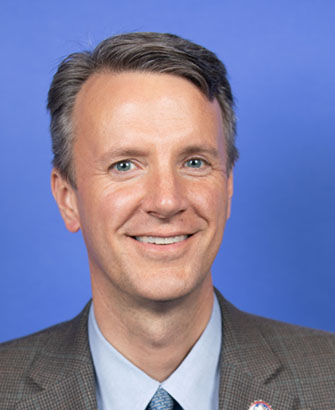

Nominee	Ben Cline	Jennifer Lewis
Party	Republican	Democratic
Popular vote	173,352	95,410
Percentage	64.4%	35.4%
- County and independent city results Cline: 50–60% 60–70% 70–80% Lewis: 50–60% 60–70%
U.S. Representative before election
Ben Cline
Republican
Elected U.S. Representative
Ben Cline
Republican

The 6th district is located in western Virginia taking in the Shenandoah Valley along Interstate 81. The district is anchored at the southern end by the cities of Roanoke and Salem. The incumbent was Republican Ben Cline, who was re-elected with 64.6% of the vote in 2020. On November 8, 2022, Congressman Cline was re-elected.

=== Republican primary ===
==== Candidates ====
===== Nominee =====
- Ben Cline, incumbent U.S. representative

===== Eliminated in primary =====
- Merritt Hale, United States Navy veteran

=== Results ===
Republican primary results
Party	Candidate	Votes	%
Republican	Ben Cline (incumbent)	19,620	82.1
Republican	Merritt Hale	4,264	17.9
Total votes		23,884	100.0

=== Democratic convention ===
==== Candidates ====
===== Nominee =====
- Jennifer Lewis, nominee for this district in 2018

=== General election ===
==== Endorsements ====
Ben Cline (R)

State officials

- Glenn Youngkin, 74th governor of Virginia (2022–2026)

==== Predictions ====
Source	Ranking	As of
The Cook Political Report	Solid R	December 28, 2021
Inside Elections	Solid R	February 8, 2022
Sabato's Crystal Ball	Safe R	January 4, 2022
Politico	Solid R	April 5, 2022
RCP	Safe R	June 9, 2022
Fox News	Solid R	July 11, 2022
DDHQ	Solid R	July 20, 2022
538	Solid R	June 30, 2022
The Economist	Safe R	September 28, 2022

==== Results ====
2022 Virginia's 6th congressional district election
Party	Candidate	Votes	%
Republican	Ben Cline (incumbent)	173,352	64.4
Democratic	Jennifer Lewis	95,410	35.4
Write-in		469	0.2
Total votes		269,231	100.0
Republican hold			

==== By county and independent city ====
Locality	Ben Cline Republican		Jennifer Lewis Democratic		Write-in Various		Margin		Total votes cast
Locality	#	%	#	%	#	%	#	%	Total votes cast
Alleghany	4,057	74.98%	1,347	24.89%	7	0.13%	2,710	50.08%	5,411
Augusta	23,358	76.62%	7,089	23.25%	40	0.13%	16,269	53.36%	30,487
Bath	1,330	78.65%	358	21.17%	3	0.18%	972	57.48%	1,691
Bedford (part)	1	100.00%	0	0.00%	0	0.00%	1	100.00%	1
Botetourt	11,118	75.60%	3,568	24.26%	21	0.14%	7,550	51.34%	14,707
Buena Vista	1,153	70.95%	466	28.68%	6	0.37%	687	42.28%	1,625
Clarke	4,270	59.48%	2,902	40.42%	7	0.10%	1,368	19.06%	7,179
Covington	1,011	68.03%	474	31.90%	1	0.07%	537	36.14%	1,486
Frederick	22,317	66.24%	11,302	33.54%	74	0.22%	11,015	32.69%	33,693
Harrisonburg	3,819	36.83%	6,526	62.94%	23	0.22%	-2,707	-26.11%	10,368
Highland	891	74.81%	297	24.94%	3	0.25%	594	49.87%	1,191
Lexington	700	34.64%	1,312	64.92%	9	0.45%	-612	-30.28%	2,021
Page	6,360	77.45%	1,847	22.49%	5	0.06%	4,513	54.96%	8,212
Roanoke City	10,780	40.96%	15,482	58.82%	58	0.22%	-4,702	-17.86%	26,320
Roanoke County (part)	14,463	67.92%	6,796	31.92%	34	0.16%	7,667	36.01%	21,293
Rockbridge	6,037	66.94%	2,964	32.86%	18	0.20%	3,073	34.07%	9,019
Rockingham	23,093	73.23%	8,392	26.61%	50	0.16%	14,701	46.62%	31,535
Salem	5,283	63.34%	3,040	36.45%	18	0.22%	2,243	26.89%	8,341
Shenandoah	11,766	72.76%	4,387	27.13%	19	0.12%	7,379	45.63%	16,172
Staunton	4,033	44.17%	5,081	55.65%	17	0.19%	-1,048	-11.48%	9,131
Warren	9,965	69.94%	4,253	29.85%	30	0.21%	5,712	40.09%	14,248
Waynesboro	3,926	54.50%	3,264	45.31%	14	0.19%	662	9.19%	7,204
Winchester	3,621	45.86%	4,263	53.99%	12	0.15%	-642	-8.13%	7,896
Totals	173,352	64.39%	95,410	35.44%	469	0.17%	77,942	28.95%	269,231

== District 7 ==
2022 Virginia's 7th congressional district election
- November 8, 2022
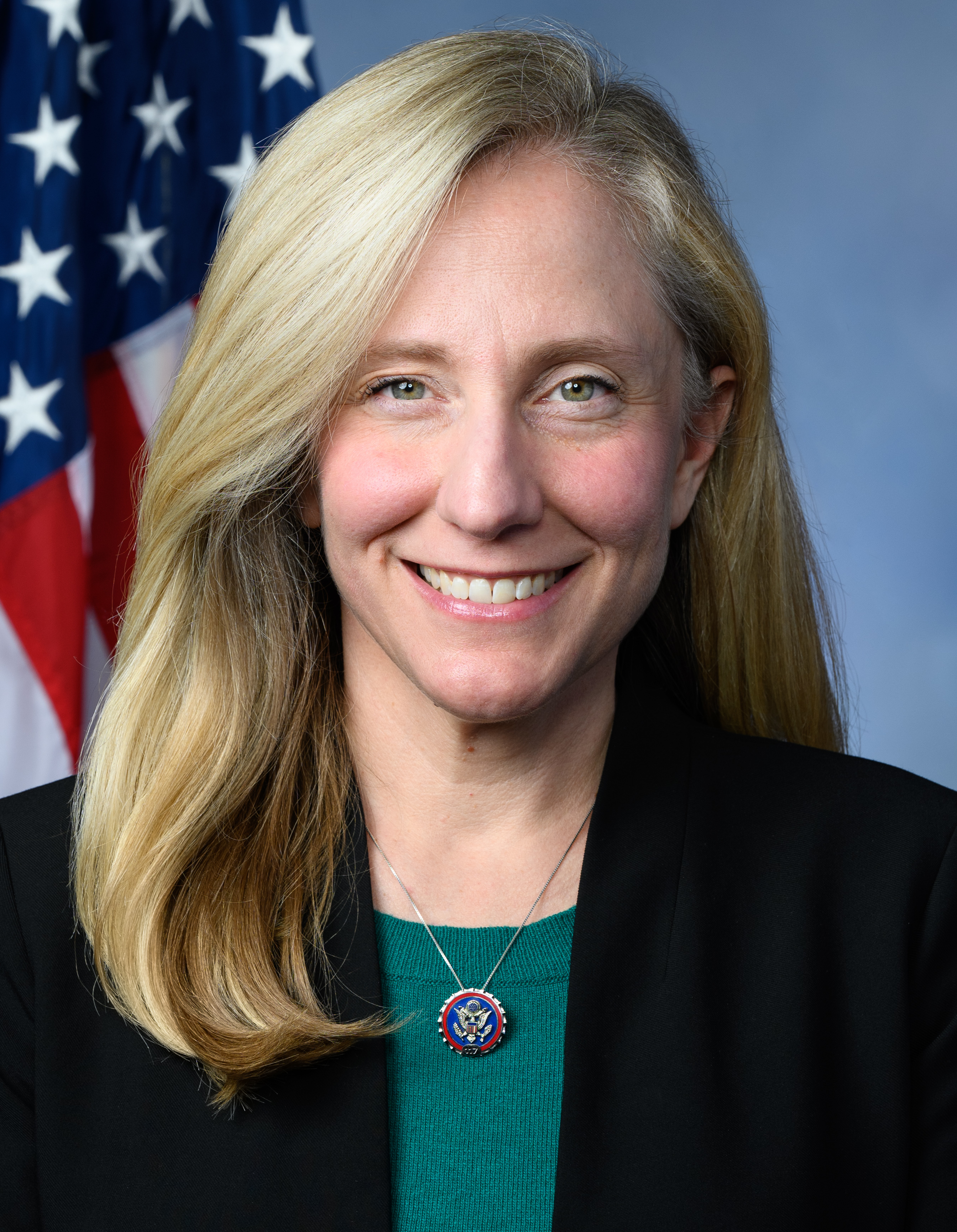

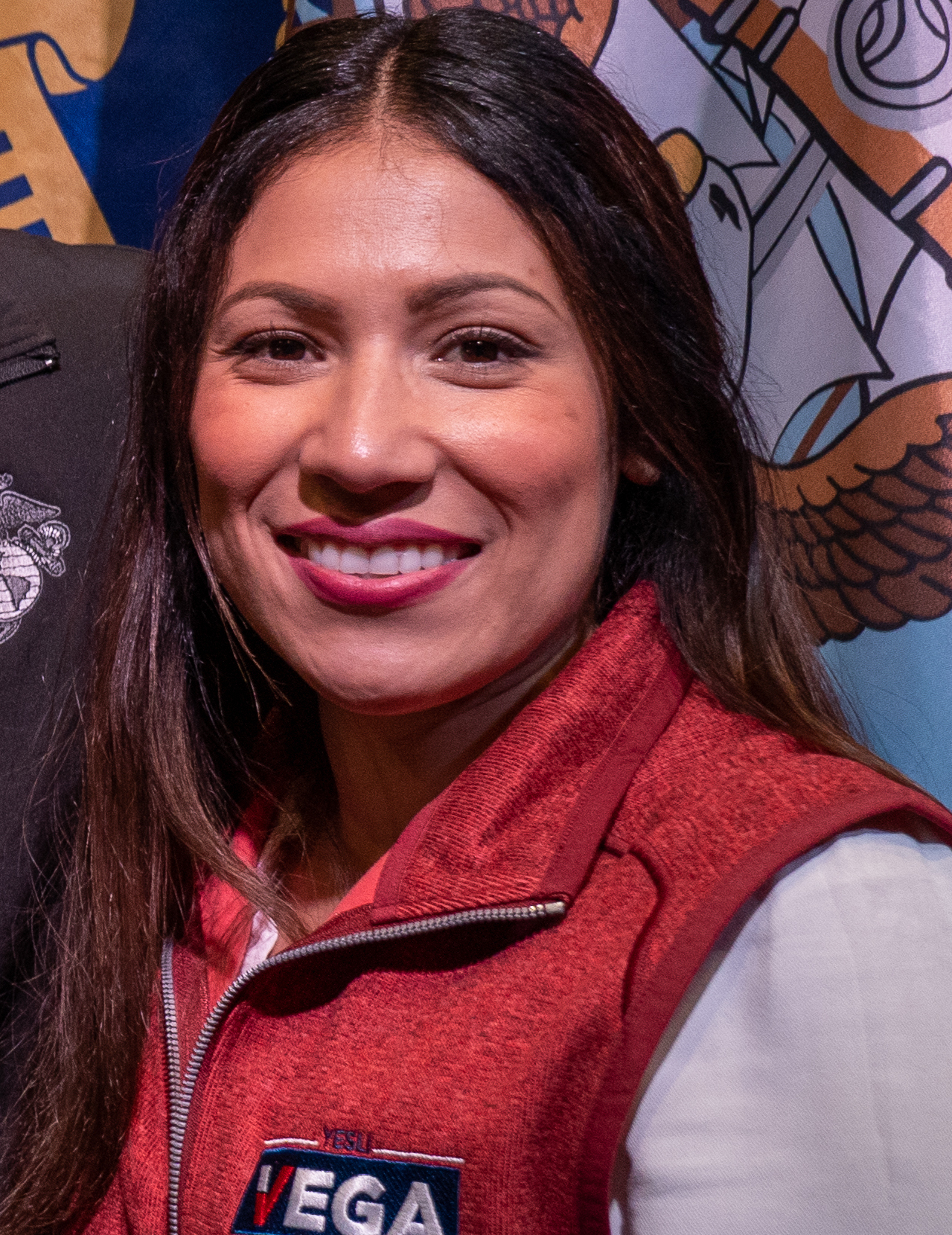
Nominee	Abigail Spanberger	Yesli Vega
Party	Democratic	Republican
Popular vote	143,357	130,586
Percentage	52.2%	47.6%
- County and independent city results Spanberger: 60–70% Vega: 40–50% 50–60% 60–70%
U.S. Representative before election
Abigail Spanberger
Democratic
Elected U.S. Representative
Abigail Spanberger
Democratic

The 7th district is based in Northern and Central Virginia. The district contains Stafford, Spotsylvania, Greene, Orange, Madison, Culpeper, Caroline, and King George counties, the city of Fredericksburg, parts of eastern Prince William County, along with a small sliver of Albemarle County. The incumbent was Democrat Abigail Spanberger, who was re-elected with 50.8% of the vote in 2020. The district was radically redrawn and no longer includes her residence in Henrico County. Despite this, Spanberger ran for re-election in this seat.

=== Democratic primary ===
==== Candidates ====
===== Nominee =====
- Abigail Spanberger, incumbent U.S. representative

===== Declined =====
- Hala Ayala, member of the Virginia House of Delegates from the 51st district (2018–2022), nominee for lieutenant governor in 2021 (running for state senate in 2023)
- Jennifer Carroll Foy, former member of the Virginia House of Delegates from the 2nd district (2018–2020), candidate for governor in 2021 (running for state senate in 2023)
- Elizabeth Guzmán, member of the Virginia House of Delegates, and candidate for lieutenant governor in 2021
- Babur Lateef, chairman of the Prince William County School Board
- Jeremy McPike, state senator

=== Republican primary ===
==== Candidates ====
===== Nominee =====
- Yesli Vega, Prince William County supervisor, chair of Latinos for Glenn Youngkin in 2021 Virginia gubernatorial election

===== Eliminated in primary =====
- Derrick Anderson, attorney and former U.S. Army Special Forces Green Beret
- Gina Ciarcia, teacher and Republican nominee for HD-02 in 2021
- Bryce Reeves, state senator, and candidate for lt. governor in 2017
- David Ross, vice-chair of the Spotsylvania County Board of Supervisors
- Crystal Vanuch, chair of the Stafford County Board of Supervisors

==== Did not qualify ====
- Michael Monteforte, federal contractor and small business owner

===== Withdrawn =====
- Gary Adkins, U.S. Air Force veteran
- Gary Barve, businessman
- John Castorani, U.S. Army veteran and candidate for Alabama's 1st congressional district in 2020 (endorsed Derrick Anderson)
- Amanda Chase, state senator, and candidate for governor in 2021 (redistricted to Virginia's 1st congressional district and withdrew) (endorsed David Ross)
- Taylor Keeney, former staffer for Governor Bob McDonnell
- John McGuire, state delegate, and candidate for Virginia's 7th congressional district in 2020 (endorsed Yesli Vega and running for SD-10)
- Tina Ramirez, nonprofit executive, congressional foreign policy adviser, founder of the congressional international religious freedom caucus, and candidate for Virginia's 7th congressional district in 2020 (running for SD-12)

===== Declined =====
- Nick Freitas, state delegate, nominee for Virginia's 7th congressional district in 2020, and candidate for U.S. Senate in 2018 (Reeves for Congress campaign chair)

==== Endorsements ====
Derrick Anderson

U.S. senators

- Tom Cotton, United States senator from Arkansas (2015–present)

U.S. representatives

- Ronny Jackson, United States representative for TX-13 (2021–present)
Bryce Reeves

Federal officials

- Rick Perry, former U.S. Secretary of Energy (2017–2019) and governor of Texas (2000–2015), lieutenant governor (1999–2000), and Agriculture Commissioner of Texas (1991–1999)

U.S. senators

- Mike Lee, United States senator from Utah (2011–present)
- Marco Rubio, United States senator from Florida (2011–present)

State delegates

- Nick Freitas, state delegate, nominee for Virginia's 7th congressional district in 2020, and candidate for U.S. Senate in 2018. (Reeves for Congress campaign chair)
- Bill Howell, former speaker of the Virginia House of Delegates (2003–2018)

Organizations

- FreedomWorks
- National Rifle Association - Political Victory Fund
Taylor Keeney (withdrawn)

Governors

- Bob McDonnell, former governor of Virginia (2010–2014)

State senators

- Siobhan Dunnavant, state senator
Tina Ramirez (withdrawn)

Organizations

- Maggie's List

=== Results ===
County and independent city results Vega: 30–40%; 50–60%; Anderson: 20–30%; 30–40%; 50–60%; Reeves: 30–40%; 40–50%; Vanuch: 30–40%

Republican primary results
Party	Candidate	Votes	%
Republican	Yesli Vega	10,913	28.9
Republican	Derrick Anderson	8,966	23.8
Republican	Bryce Reeves	7,580	20.1
Republican	Crystal Vanuch	6,400	17.0
Republican	David Ross	2,284	6.1
Republican	Gina Ciarcia	1,565	4.2
Total votes		37,708	100.0

=== General election ===
==== Predictions ====
Source	Ranking	As of
The Cook Political Report	Tossup	October 25, 2022
Inside Elections	Tilt D	February 8, 2022
Sabato's Crystal Ball	Lean D	January 4, 2022
Politico	Tossup	November 3, 2022
RCP	Tossup	June 9, 2022
Fox News	Tossup	November 1, 2022
DDHQ	Lean D	November 6, 2022
538	Lean D	October 25, 2022
The Economist	Lean D	November 1, 2022

==== Endorsements ====
Abigail Spanberger (D)

Executive branch officials

- Miles Taylor, chief of staff to the United States Secretary of Homeland Security (2019) (Forward)
- Christine Todd Whitman, administrator of the Environmental Protection Agency (2001–2003) and governor of New Jersey (1994–2001) (Forward)

U.S. representatives

- Liz Cheney, U.S. representative for Wyoming's at-large congressional district (2017–present) (Republican)
- Denver Riggleman, former U.S. representative for Virginia's 5th congressional district (2019–2021) (Independent, former Republican)

State officials

- Hala Ayala, former delegate for Virginia's 51st House of Delegates district (2018–22)
- Joshua Cole, former delegate for Virginia's 28th House of Delegates district (2020–22)
- Jennifer Carroll Foy, former delegate for Virginia's 2nd House of Delegates district (2018–20)
- Elizabeth Guzmán, delegate for Virginia's 31st House of Delegates district (2018–present)
- Jeremy McPike, state senator for Virginia's 29th Senate district (2016–present)
- Scott Surovell, state senator for Virginia's 36th Senate district (2016–present)

Organizations

- American Israel Public Affairs Committee
- EMILY's List
- End Citizens United
- Feminist Majority PAC
- Forward Party
- Giffords
- Humane Society of the United States Legislative Fund
- Jewish Democratic Council of America
- League of Conservation Voters
- NARAL Pro-Choice America
- Natural Resources Defense Council
- New Politics
- Planned Parenthood Action Fund
- Sierra Club
- VoteVets.org

Newspapers

- The Washington Post
Yesli Vega (R)

Executive branch officials

- Donald Trump, 45th president of the United States (2017–2021)

U.S. senators

- Ted Cruz, U.S. senator from Texas (2013–present)

U.S. representatives

- Dave Brat, former U.S. representative for Virginia's 7th congressional district (2014–2019)
- Tulsi Gabbard, former U.S. representative for Hawaii's 2nd congressional district (2013–2021) (Independent, former Democrat)
- Louie Gohmert, U.S. representative for Texas's 1st congressional district (2005–present)
- Bob Good, U.S. representative for Virginia's 5th congressional district (2021–present)
- Chip Roy, U.S. representative for Texas's 21st congressional district (2021–present)

State officials

- Jason Miyares, attorney general of Virginia (2022–present)
- Winsome Sears, lieutenant governor of Virginia (2022–present)
- Glenn Youngkin, governor of Virginia (2022–present)

Organizations

- Maggie's List
- Citizens United, conservative nonprofit organization
- Club for Growth PAC (post-primary)
- Eagle Forum, conservative interest group
- National Border Patrol Council

==== Polling ====
Poll source	Date(s) administered	Sample size	Margin of error	Abigail Spanberger (D)	Yesli Vega (R)	Other	Undecided
Wick Insights/RRH Elections (R)	October 23–26, 2022	525 (LV)	± 4.0%	47%	47%	–	6%
RMG Research	July 31 – August 6, 2022	400 (LV)	± 4.9%	46%	41%	3%	10%

==== Results ====
2022 Virginia's 7th congressional district election
Party	Candidate	Votes	%
Democratic	Abigail Spanberger (incumbent)	143,357	52.2
Republican	Yesli Vega	130,586	47.6
Write-in		637	0.2
Total votes		274,580	100.0
Democratic hold			

==== By county and independent city ====
Locality	Abigail Spanberger Democratic		Yesli Vega Republican		Write-in Various		Margin		Total votes cast
Locality	#	%	#	%	#	%	#	%	Total votes cast
Albemarle (part)	7	33.33%	14	66.67%	0	0.00%	−7	−33.33%	21
Caroline	5,244	45.17%	6,350	54.70%	15	0.13%	−1,106	−9.53%	11,609
Culpeper	7,979	39.47%	12,198	60.34%	39	0.19%	−4,219	−20.87%	20,216
Fredericksburg	6,082	66.34%	3,066	33.44%	20	0.22%	3,016	32.90%	9,168
Greene	3,307	39.20%	5,114	60.62%	15	0.18%	−1,807	−21.42%	8,436
King George	3,913	37.16%	6,590	62.59%	26	0.25%	−2,677	−25.43%	10,529
Madison	2,320	35.85%	4,143	64.02%	8	0.12%	−1,823	−28.17%	6,471
Orange	6,432	39.81%	9,695	60.01%	28	0.17%	−3,263	−20.20%	16,155
Prince William (part)	53,964	67.98%	25,220	31.77%	202	0.25%	28,744	36.21%	79,386
Spotsylvania	25,424	46.26%	29,390	53.48%	140	0.25%	−3,966	−7.22%	54,954
Stafford	28,685	49.77%	28,806	49.98%	144	0.25%	−121	−0.21%	57,635
Totals	143,357	52.21%	130,586	47.56%	637	0.23%	12,771	4.65%	274,580

== District 8 ==
2022 Virginia's 8th congressional district election
- November 8, 2022
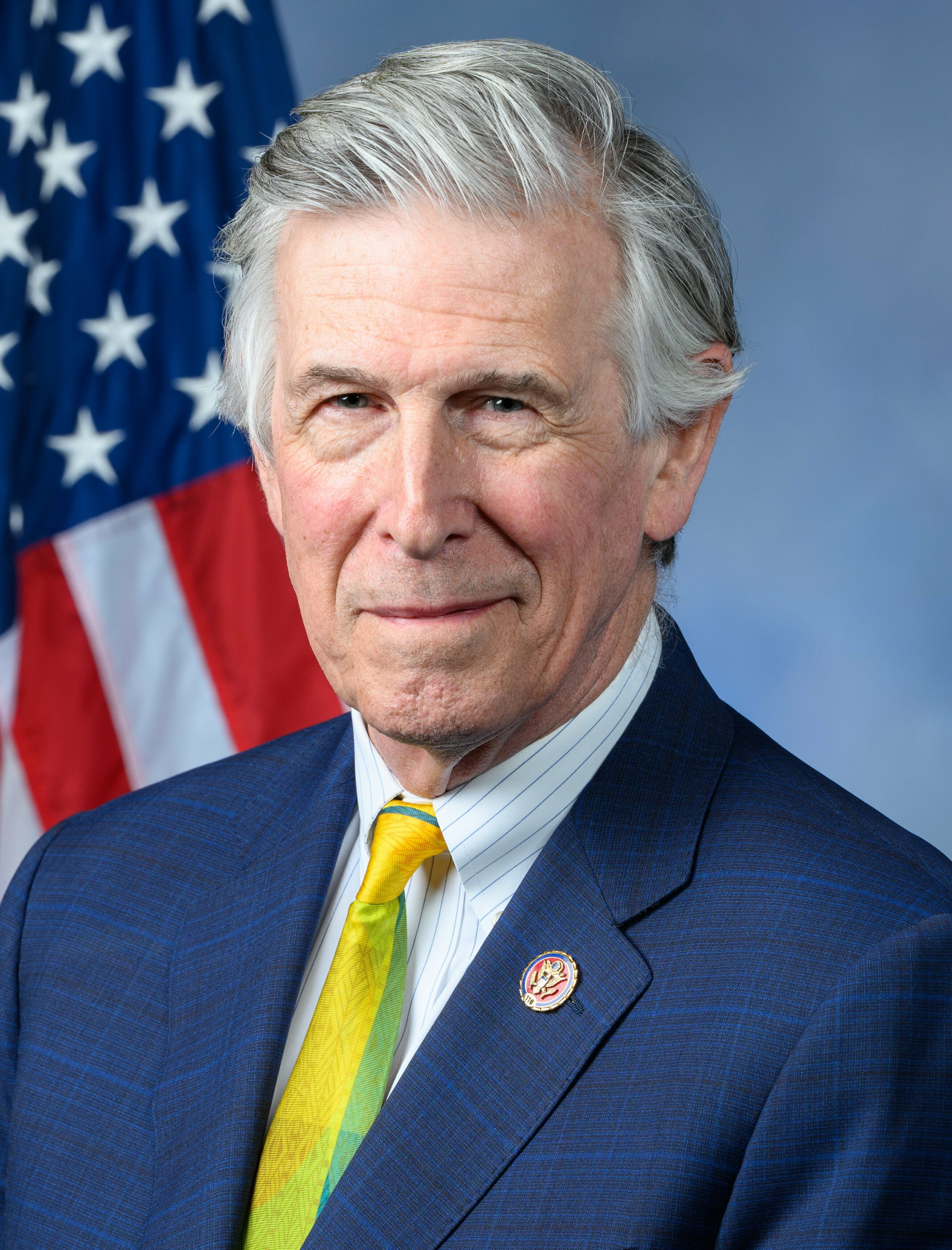

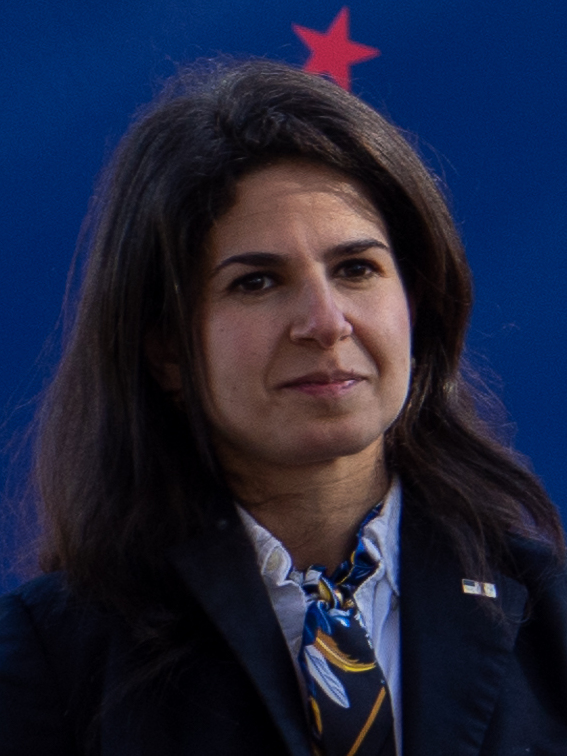
Nominee	Don Beyer	Karina Lipsman
Party	Democratic	Republican
Popular vote	197,760	66,589
Percentage	73.5%	24.8%
- County and independent city results Beyer: 60–70% 70–80%
U.S. Representative before election
Don Beyer
Democratic
Elected U.S. Representative
Don Beyer
Democratic

The 8th district is based in northern Virginia and encompasses the inner Washington, D.C. suburbs, including Arlington, Alexandria, and Falls Church. The incumbent was Democrat Don Beyer, who was re-elected with 75.8% of the vote in 2020. On November 8, 2022, Congressman Beyer was re-elected.

=== Democratic primary ===
==== Candidates ====
===== Nominee =====
- Don Beyer, incumbent U.S. representative, former ambassador to Switzerland and Liechtenstein and lieutenant governor

===== Eliminated in primary =====
- Victoria Virasingh, IT worker

==== Endorsements ====
Don Beyer

Organizations

- Feminist Majority PAC
- Humane Society of the United States Legislative Fund
- League of Conservation Voters
- Natural Resources Defense Council
- Planned Parenthood Action Fund
- Sierra Club

Newspapers

- Falls Church News-Press

=== Results ===
Democratic primary results
Party	Candidate	Votes	%
Democratic	Don Beyer (incumbent)	39,062	77.1
Democratic	Victoria Virasingh	11,583	22.9
Total votes		50,645	100.0

=== Republican Convention ===
==== Candidates ====
===== Nominee =====
- Karina Lipsman, former Department of Defense contractor

===== Eliminated at convention =====
- Monica Carpio, economist
- Jeff Jordan, defense contractor and Republican nominee for VA-08 in 2020
- Heerak Christian Kim, educator
- Kezia Tunnell, businesswoman and Republican candidate for TX-19 in 2020

=== Other candidates ===
==== Declared ====
- Teddy Fikre, business consultant (independent)
- Heerak Christian Kim, educator and former Republican candidate for this seat (write-in)

=== Results ===
Republican convention results
Party	Candidate	Votes	%
Republican	Karina Lipsman	440	61.5
Republican	Kezia Tunnell	137	19.1
Republican	Jeff Jordan	114	15.9
Republican	Heerak Christian Kim	17	2.4
Republican	Monica Carpio	8	1.1
Total votes		716	100.0

=== General election ===
==== Predictions ====
Source	Ranking	As of
The Cook Political Report	Solid D	December 28, 2021
Inside Elections	Solid D	February 8, 2022
Sabato's Crystal Ball	Safe D	January 4, 2022
Politico	Solid D	April 5, 2022
RCP	Safe D	June 9, 2022
Fox News	Solid D	July 11, 2022
DDHQ	Solid D	July 20, 2022
538	Solid D	June 30, 2022
The Economist	Safe D	September 28, 2022

==== Results ====
2022 Virginia's 8th congressional district election
Party	Candidate	Votes	%
Democratic	Don Beyer (incumbent)	197,760	73.5
Republican	Karina Lipsman	66,589	24.8
Independent	Teddy Fikre	4,078	1.5
Write-in		503	0.2
Total votes		268,930	100.0
Democratic hold			

==== By county and independent city ====
Locality	Don Beyer Democratic		Karina Lipsman Republican		Various candidates Other parties		Margin		Total votes cast
Locality	#	%	#	%	#	%	#	%	Total votes cast
Alexandria	41,974	77.41%	11,276	20.80%	973	1.79%	30,698	56.61%	54,223
Arlington	70,856	77.58%	18,699	20.47%	1,779	1.95%	52,157	57.11%	91,334
Fairfax County (part)	79,796	68.24%	35,421	30.29%	1,719	1.47%	44,375	37.95%	116,936
Falls Church	5,134	79.76%	1,193	18.53%	110	1.71%	3,941	61.22%	6,437
Totals	197,760	73.54%	66,589	24.76%	4,581	1.70%	131,171	48.78%	268,930

== District 9 ==
2022 Virginia's 9th congressional district election
- November 8, 2022
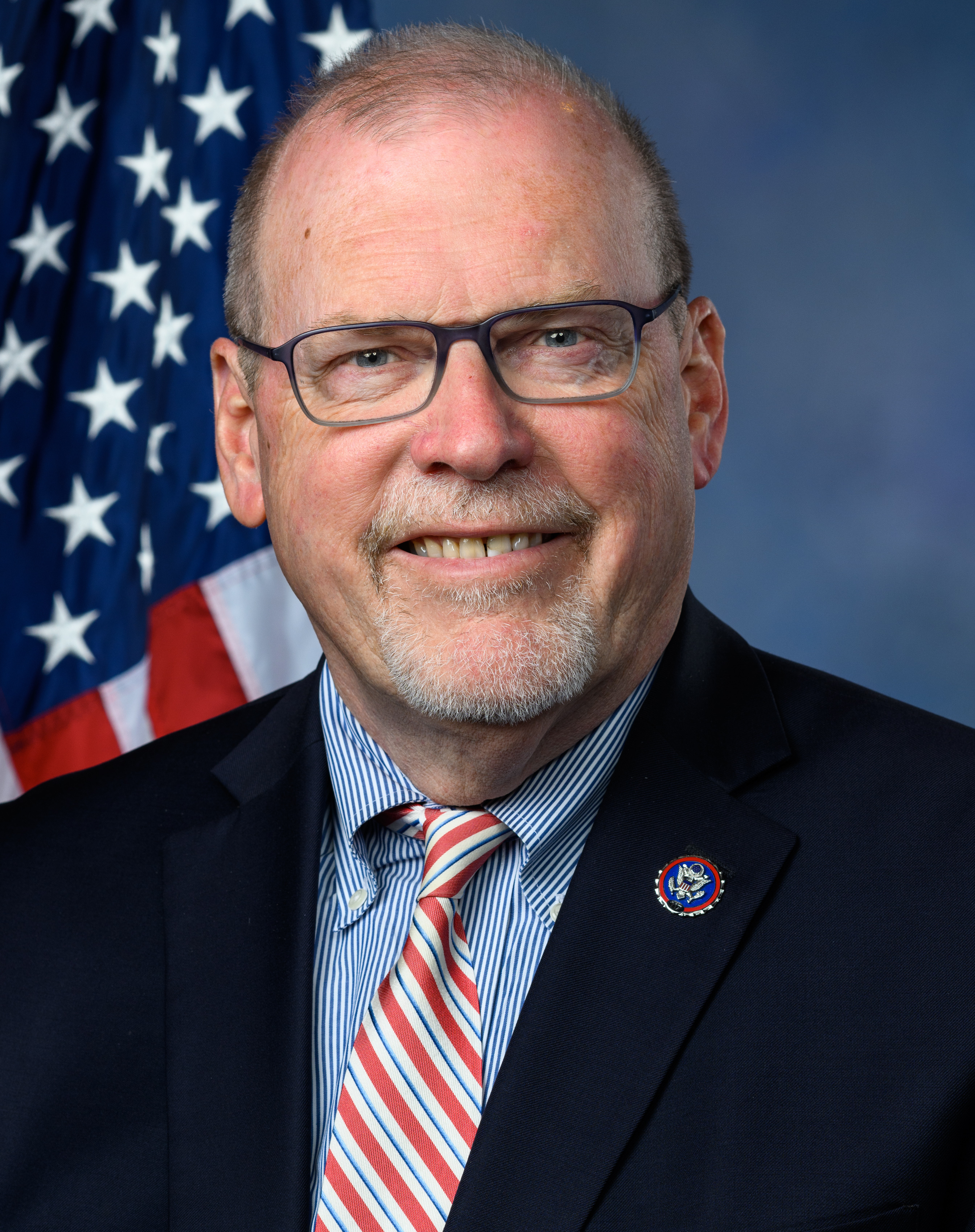

Nominee	Morgan Griffith	Taysha DeVaughan
Party	Republican	Democratic
Popular vote	182,207	66,027
Percentage	73.2%	26.5%
- County and independent city results Griffith: 50–60% 60–70% 70–80% 80–90% DeVaughan: 50–60%
U.S. Representative before election
Morgan Griffith
Republican
Elected U.S. Representative
Morgan Griffith
Republican

The 9th district takes in rural southwest Virginia, including Abingdon, Blacksburg, Bristol and Norton. The incumbent was Republican Morgan Griffith, who was re-elected with 94% of the vote in 2020 without opposition from any party. Despite his home in Salem no longer being in the district. Griffith was running for re-election in this seat. On November 8, 2022, Congressman Morgan Griffith was re-elected.

=== Republican primary ===
==== Candidates ====
===== Nominee =====
- Morgan Griffith, incumbent U.S. representative

==== Failed to qualify ====
- Kimberly Lowe, farmer and activist

=== Democratic primary ===
==== Candidates ====
===== Nominee =====
- Taysha DeVaughan, community activist

=== General election ===
==== Predictions ====
Source	Ranking	As of
The Cook Political Report	Solid R	December 28, 2021
Inside Elections	Solid R	February 8, 2022
Sabato's Crystal Ball	Safe R	January 4, 2022
Politico	Solid R	April 5, 2022
RCP	Safe R	June 9, 2022
Fox News	Solid R	July 11, 2022
DDHQ	Solid R	July 20, 2022
538	Solid R	June 30, 2022
The Economist	Safe R	September 28, 2022

==== Endorsements ====
Taysha DeVaughan (D)

Organizations

- Sierra Club

==== Results ====
2022 Virginia's 9th congressional district election
Party	Candidate	Votes	%
Republican	Morgan Griffith (incumbent)	182,207	73.2
Democratic	Taysha DeVaughan	66,027	26.5
Write-in		555	0.2
Total votes		248,789	100.0
Republican hold			

==== By county and independent city ====
Locality	Morgan Griffith Republican		Taysha DeVaughan Democratic		Write-in Various		Margin		Total votes cast
Locality	#	%	#	%	#	%	#	%	Total votes cast
Bedford (part)	16,124	79.15%	4,221	20.72%	27	0.13%	11,903	58.43%	20,372
Bland	1,922	86.38%	296	13.30%	7	0.31%	1,626	73.08%	2,225
Bristol	3,130	71.09%	1,259	28.59%	14	0.32%	1,871	42.49%	4,403
Buchanan	3,969	83.65%	767	16.16%	9	0.19%	3,202	67.48%	4,745
Carroll	8,496	83.21%	1,685	16.50%	29	0.28%	6,811	66.71%	10,210
Craig	1,715	82.85%	350	16.91%	5	0.24%	1,365	65.94%	2,070
Dickenson	3,018	77.44%	864	22.17%	15	0.38%	2,154	55.27%	3,897
Floyd	4,208	67.58%	2,005	32.20%	14	0.22%	2,203	35.38%	6,227
Franklin County	15,259	74.76%	5,131	25.14%	22	0.11%	10,128	49.62%	20,412
Galax	1,208	75.26%	395	24.61%	2	0.12%	813	50.65%	1,605
Giles	4,436	76.68%	1,337	23.11%	12	0.21%	3,099	53.57%	5,785
Grayson	4,393	81.59%	985	18.29%	6	0.11%	3,408	63.30%	5,384
Henry	10,984	70.93%	4,486	28.97%	16	0.10%	6,498	41.96%	15,486
Lee	4,806	84.85%	842	14.87%	16	0.28%	3,964	69.99%	5,664
Martinsville	1,642	44.58%	2,032	55.17%	9	0.24%	-390	-10.59%	3,683
Montgomery	13,563	48.67%	14,239	51.09%	67	0.24%	-676	-2.43%	27,869
Norton	666	71.00%	266	28.36%	6	0.64%	400	42.64%	938
Patrick	4,864	81.87%	1,065	17.93%	12	0.20%	3,799	63.95%	5,941
Pulaski	8,065	74.27%	2,768	25.49%	26	0.24%	5,297	48.78%	10,859
Radford	2,006	53.35%	1,744	46.38%	10	0.27%	262	6.97%	3,760
Roanoke County (part)	9,823	60.97%	6,240	38.73%	48	0.30%	3,583	22.24%	16,111
Russell	6,471	82.65%	1,337	17.08%	21	0.27%	5,134	65.58%	7,829
Scott	5,607	85.69%	928	14.18%	8	0.12%	4,679	71.51%	6,543
Smyth	6,935	82.00%	1,496	17.69%	26	0.31%	5,439	64.31%	8,457
Tazewell	9,876	85.60%	1,635	14.17%	27	0.23%	8,241	71.42%	11,538
Washington	13,870	77.18%	4,047	22.52%	53	0.29%	9,823	54.66%	17,970
Wise	7,506	80.58%	1,783	19.14%	26	0.28%	5,723	61.44%	9,315
Wythe	7,645	80.55%	1,824	19.22%	22	0.23%	5,821	61.33%	9,491
Totals	182,207	73.24%	66,027	26.54%	555	0.22%	116,180	46.70%	248,789

== District 10 ==
2022 Virginia's 10th congressional district election
- November 8, 2022
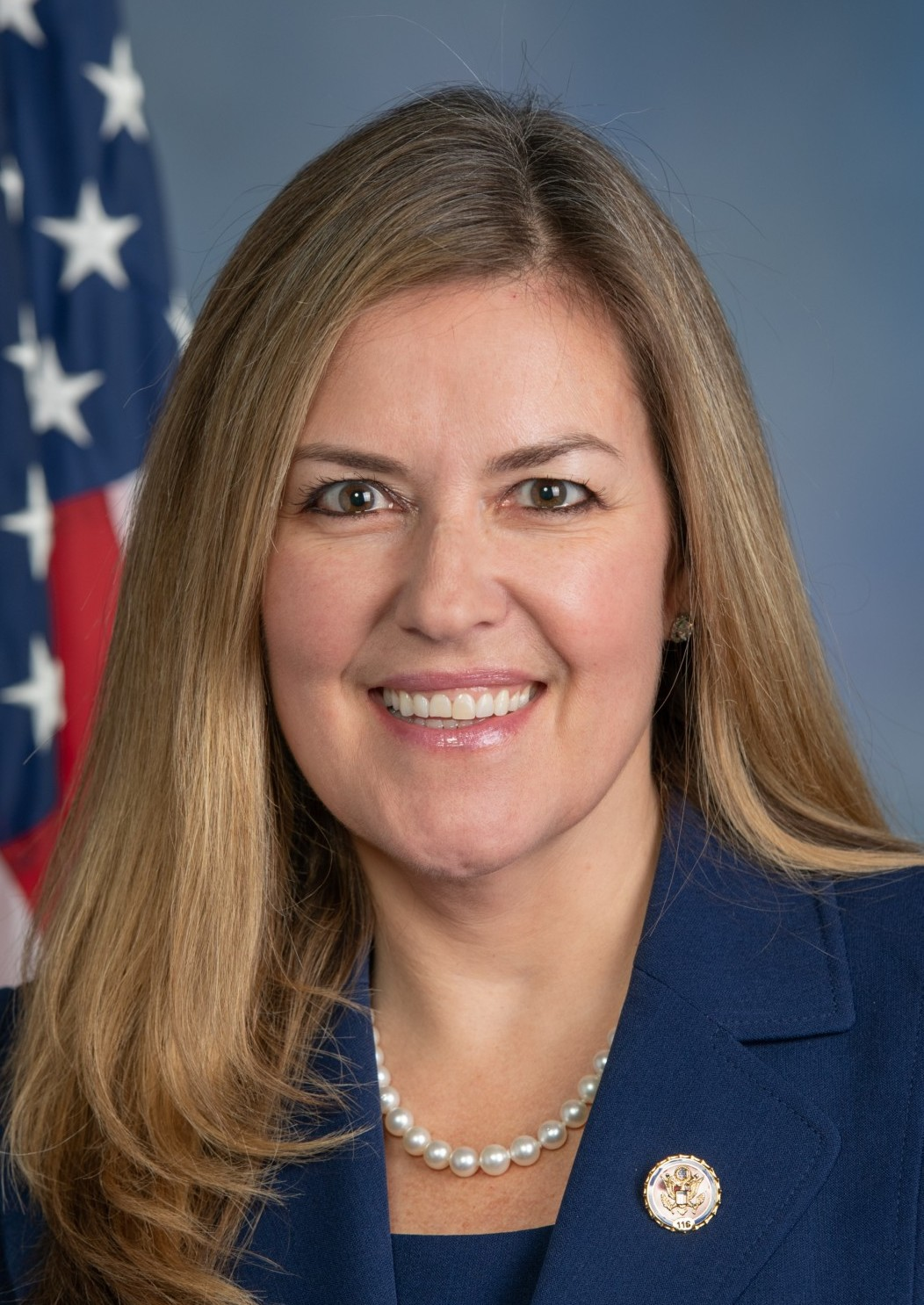

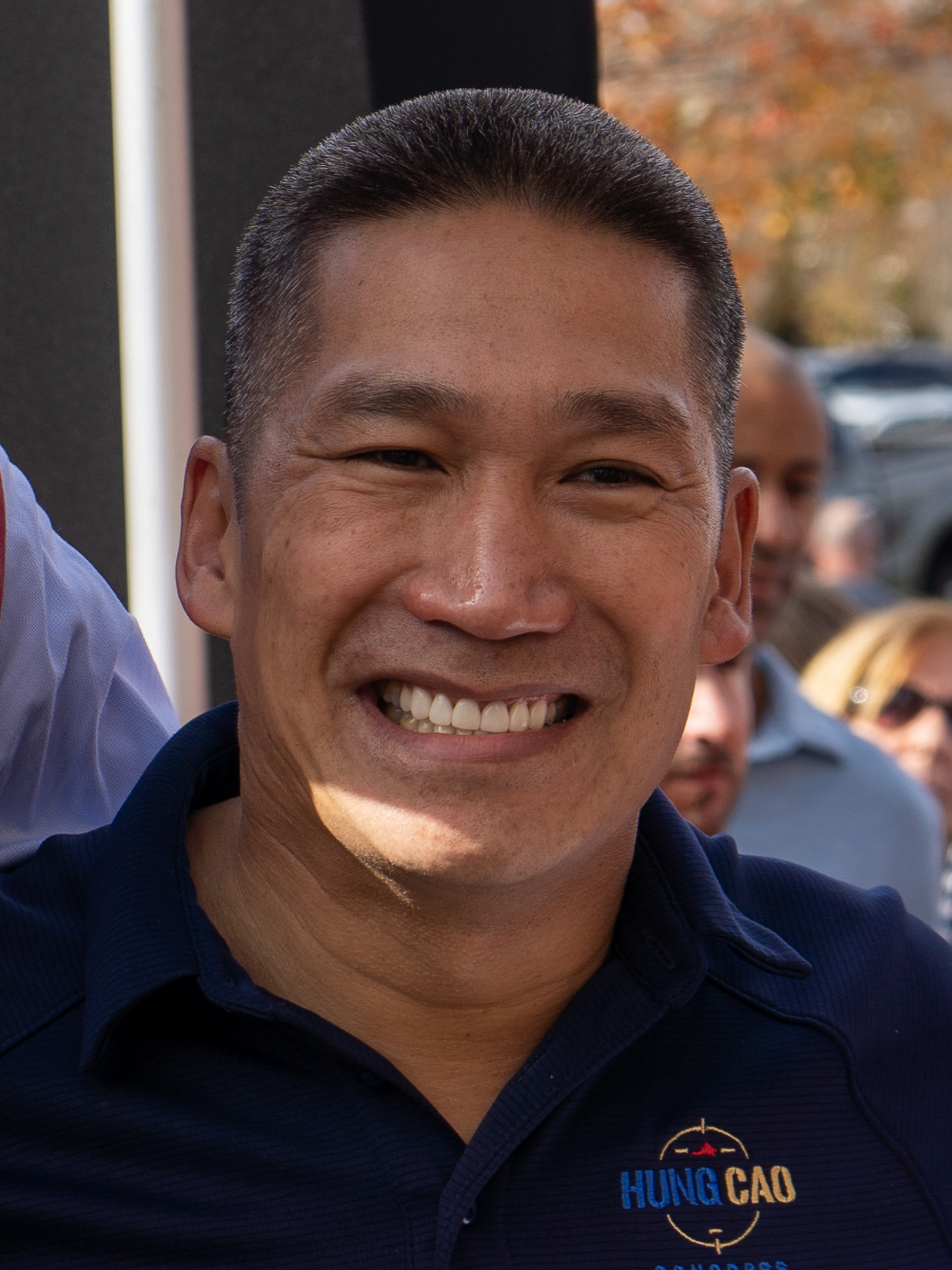
Nominee	Jennifer Wexton	Hung Cao
Party	Democratic	Republican
Popular vote	157,405	138,163
Percentage	53.2%	46.7%
- County and independent city results Wexton: 50–60% 60–70% Cao: 50–60% 60–70%
U.S. Representative before election
Jennifer Wexton
Democratic
Elected U.S. Representative
Jennifer Wexton
Democratic

The 10th district is based in northern Virginia and the D.C. metro area, encompassing Fauquier, Loudoun, and Rappahannock counties, the independent cities of Mansassas and Manassas Park, and portions of Fairfax and Prince William counties. Democratic incumbent Jennifer Wexton was re-elected with 56.5% of the vote in 2020.

=== Democratic primary ===
==== Candidates ====
===== Nominee =====
- Jennifer Wexton, incumbent U.S. representative

==== Withdrawn ====
- Shadi Ayyas, physician

==== Endorsements ====
Jennifer Wexton

Organizations

- Feminist Majority PAC
- Giffords
- Humane Society of the United States Legislative Fund
- League of Conservation Voters
- Natural Resources Defense Council
- Planned Parenthood Action Fund
- Sierra Club

=== Republican primary ===
==== Nominee ====
- Hung Cao, retired U.S. Navy captain

==== Eliminated in primary ====
- John Beatty, Loudoun County School Board member
- Dave Beckwith, U.S. Air Force veteran
- Mike Clancy, tech company manager
- Theresa Ellis, Manassas city councilor
- John Henley, U.S. Air Force veteran
- Jeanine Lawson, Prince William County supervisor
- Caleb Max, businessman
- Jeff Mayhugh
- Brandon Michon, real estate financier
- Brooke Taylor, former college professor

===== Withdrawn =====
- Monica Carpio, economist (running in the 8th district)
- Paul Lott, author and education consultant
- Clay Percle, defense industry consultant and U.S. Air Force veteran

==== Endorsements ====
Jeanine Lawson

U.S. executive branch officials

- Ken Cuccinelli, former acting United States Deputy Secretary of Homeland Security (2019–2021) and former attorney general of Virginia (2010–2014)

U.S. representatives

- Elise Stefanik, U.S. representative for New York's 21st congressional district (2015–present) and chair of the House Republican Conference (2021–present)

Organizations

- FreedomWorks

==== Results ====
Virginia 10th district GOP firehouse primary
Candidate	Round 1		Round 2		Round 3		Round 4		Round 5		Round 6		Round 7		Round 8		Round 9	
Candidate	Votes	%	Votes	%	Votes	%	Votes	%	Votes	%	Votes	%	Votes	%	Votes	%	Votes	%
Hung Cao	6,363	42%	6,379	42.1%	6,393	42.2%	6,471	42.8%	6,562	43.5%	6,672	44.4%	6,998	46.6%	7,238	48.7%	7,729	52.3%
Jeanine Lawson	4,373	28.9%	4,382	30%	4,390	29%	4,433	29.3%	4,503	29.8%	4,564	30.4%	4,693	31.2%	4,800	32.3%	5,000	33.8%
Brandon Michon	1,538	10.2%	1,551	10.2%	1,555	10.3%	1,588	10.5%	1,612	10.7%	1,614	10.7%	1,733	11.5%	1,854	12.5%	2,052	13.9%
Mike Clancy	719	4.7%	721	4.8%	724	4.8%	739	4.9%	764	5.1%	794	6.3%	876	5.8%	979	6.6%	Eliminated	
Caleb Max	621	4.1%	623	4.1%	627	4.1%	646	4.3%	678	4.5%	707	4.7%	727	4.8%	Eliminated			
John Henley	612	4%	614	4.1%	619	4.1%	628	4.2%	641	4.2%	676	4.5%	Eliminated					
Dave Beckwith	308	2%	308	2%	312	2.1%	328	2.2%	333	2.2%	Eliminated							
Theresa Ellis	259	1.7%	262	1.7%	276	1.8%	285	1.9%	Eliminated									
John Beatty	232	1.5%	232	1.5%	237	1.6%	Eliminated											
Jeff Mayhugh	64	0.4%	66	0.4%	Eliminated													
Brooke Taylor	56	0.4%	Eliminated															

=== General election ===
==== Predictions ====
Source	Ranking	As of
The Cook Political Report	Likely D	October 25, 2022
Inside Elections	Likely D	October 21, 2022
Sabato's Crystal Ball	Likely D	June 22, 2022
Politico	Likely D	August 12, 2022
RCP	Lean D	October 17, 2022
Fox News	Likely D	July 11, 2022
DDHQ	Likely D	October 17, 2022
538	Likely D	October 20, 2022
The Economist	Likely D	October 4, 2022

==== Debates and forums ====
Both candidates agreed to four joint events.

The first forum was hosted by The Arc of Northern Virginia (NoVA), an advocacy center for disabled children and seniors. They have been hosting these forums since 2020. It was the only online event in which both Wexton and Cao participated. It also included the Democratic and Republican candidates for the 7th and 10th congressional districts. The Arc of NoVA asked their own questions, questions sent to them ahead of time, and questions taken from a Facebook chat. As mentioned at the start of the forum, all candidates were sent the questions they were planning to ask as well as questions that were sent in.

2022 Virginia 10th congressional U.S. representative debates and forums
No.	Date	Host	Moderator	Link	Participants	
P Participant A Absent N Non-invitee I Invitee W Withdrawn						
P Participant A Absent N Non-invitee I Invitee W Withdrawn					Jennifer Wexton	Hung Cao
1	August 23, 2022	Arc of NoVA	Lucy Beadnell		P	P
2	October 2, 2022	MOVE Chamber	Ayan Sheikh		P	P
3	October 5, 2022	Prince William Committee of 100	Stephen J. Farnsworth		P	P
4	October 20, 2022	Loudoun Chamber	Tony Howard		P	P

==== Polling ====
Poll source	Date(s) administered	Sample size	Margin of error	Jennifer Wexton (D)	Hung Cao (R)	Undecided
OnMessage (R) (Note: Poll conducted for Cao's campaign)	October 11–13, 2022	400 (LV)	± 4.9%	43%	41%	16%

==== Results ====
2022 Virginia's 10th congressional district election
Party	Candidate	Votes	%
Democratic	Jennifer Wexton (incumbent)	157,405	53.2
Republican	Hung Cao	138,163	46.7
Write-in		572	0.2
Total votes		296,140	100.0
Democratic hold			

==== By county and independent city ====
Locality	Jennifer Wexton Democratic		Hung Cao Republican		Write-in Various		Margin		Total votes cast
Locality	#	%	#	%	#	%	#	%	Total votes cast
Fairfax County (part)	4,940	50.72%	4,781	49.09%	18	0.18%	159	1.63%	9,739
Fauquier	12,408	37.42%	20,704	62.44%	45	0.14%	-8,296	-25.02%	33,157
Loudoun	94,116	57.75%	68,505	42.03%	355	0.22%	25,611	15.71%	162,976
Manassas	6,029	56.59%	4,609	43.26%	15	0.14%	1,420	13.33%	10,653
Manassas Park	2,041	60.89%	1,304	38.90%	7	0.21%	737	21.99%	3,352
Prince William (part)	36,149	50.07%	35,931	49.76%	122	0.17%	218	0.30%	72,202
Rappahannock	1,722	42.40%	2,329	57.35%	10	0.25%	-607	-14.95%	4,061
Totals	157,405	53.15%	138,163	46.65%	572	0.19%	19,242	6.50%	296,140

== District 11 ==
2022 Virginia's 11th congressional district election
- November 8, 2022
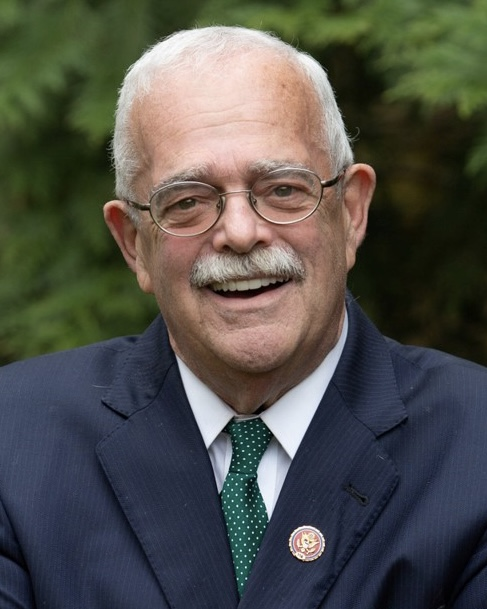

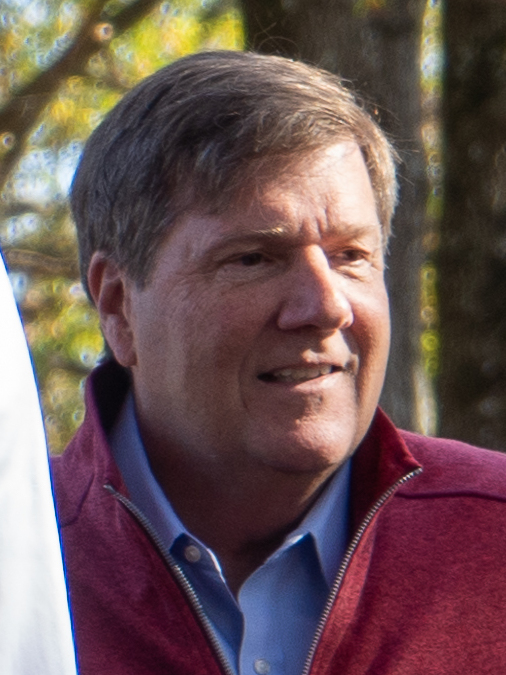
Nominee	Gerry Connolly	Jim Myles
Party	Democratic	Republican
Popular vote	193,190	95,634
Percentage	66.7%	33.0%
- County and independent city results Connolly: 60–70%
U.S. Representative before election
Gerry Connolly
Democratic
Elected U.S. Representative
Gerry Connolly
Democratic

The 11th district encompasses portions of suburban Washington, D.C., including the city of Fairfax and portions of Fairfax County. The incumbent was Democrat Gerry Connolly, who was re-elected with 71.4% of the vote in 2020. On November 8, 2022, Congressman Connolly was re-elected.

=== Democratic primary ===
==== Candidates ====
===== Nominee =====
- Gerry Connolly, incumbent U.S. representative

==== Did not qualify ====
- Ally Dalsimer, DoD Natural Resources Program manager (2015–2019), Obama Climate Task Force
- Dereje Gerawork, community activist, talk show host

==== Endorsements ====
Gerry Connolly

Organizations

- Humane Society of the United States Legislative Fund
- League of Conservation Voters
- Planned Parenthood Action Fund
- Sierra Club

=== Republican firehouse convention ===
==== Nominee ====
- Jim Myles, retired federal judge

===== Eliminated in convention =====
- Manga Anantatmula, businesswoman and Republican nominee for VA-11 in 2020
- Joe Babb, former U.S. diplomat
- Barbara Banks
- Matthew Chappell, U.S. Army veteran

=== Results ===
Virginia GOP 11th district, firehouse primary
Candidate	Round 1		Round 2		Round 3		Round 4	
Candidate	Votes	%	Votes	%	Votes	%	Votes	%
Jim Myles	670	40.17%	681	40.9%	752	45.44%	959	59.2%
Manga Anantatmula	517	31%	530	31.83%	559	33.78%	661	40.8%
Matthew Chappell	309	18.53%	316	18.98%	344	20.79%	Eliminated	
Joe Babb	129	7.73%	138	8.29%	Eliminated			
Barbara Banks	43	2.58%	Eliminated					

=== General election ===
==== Predictions ====
Source	Ranking	As of
The Cook Political Report	Solid D	December 28, 2021
Inside Elections	Solid D	February 8, 2022
Sabato's Crystal Ball	Safe D	January 4, 2022
Politico	Solid D	April 5, 2022
RCP	Safe D	June 9, 2022
Fox News	Solid D	July 11, 2022
DDHQ	Solid D	July 20, 2022
538	Solid D	June 30, 2022
The Economist	Safe D	September 28, 2022

==== Results ====
2022 Virginia's 11th congressional district election
Party	Candidate	Votes	%
Democratic	Gerry Connolly (incumbent)	193,190	66.7
Republican	Jim Myles	95,634	33.0
Write-in		852	0.3
Total votes		289,676	100.0
Democratic hold			

==== By county and independent city ====
Locality	Gerry Connolly Democratic		Jim Myles Republican		Write-in Various		Margin		Total votes cast
Locality	#	%	#	%	#	%	#	%	Total votes cast
Fairfax City	6,384	66.22%	3,235	33.55%	24	0.23%	3,151	32.66%	9,643
Fairfax County (part)	186,806	66.71%	92,399	33.00%	828	0.29%	94,407	33.72%	280,033
Totals	193,190	66.70%	95,634	33.02%	852	0.29%	97,556	33.68%	289,676

== Notes ==
Partisan clients
