= George R. C. Stuart =

American attorney and politician

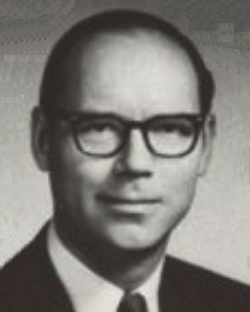
- Official portrait, 1970

Member of the Virginia House of Delegates
- In office January 14, 1970 – January 9, 1974 Serving with Ford C. Quillen (1970–1972); Willard Lemmon (1972–1974)
- Preceded by: James B. Fugate
- Succeeded by: Joseph A. Johnson
- Constituency: 62nd district (1970–1972); 2nd district (1972–1974)

Personal details
- Born: George Rogers Clark Stuart; August 31, 1924 Abingdon, Virginia, U.S.
- Died: August 23, 2008 (aged 83) Abingdon, Virginia, U.S.
- Party: Democratic
- Spouses: Margaret Lane Anderson (m. 1960, divorced); Mary Elizabeth Baker (m. 1977)
- Education: Williams College (BA); Balliol College, Oxford (MA); University of Virginia (LLB)
- Occupation: Lawyer; politician

Military service
- Branch/service: United States Army
- Years of service: 1943–1946
- Battles/wars: World War II; European theater

George Rogers Clark Stuart (August 31, 1924 – August 23, 2008) was an American attorney and politician. He served as President of the Virginia Bar Association from 1968 to 1969, after which he was elected as a Democrat to the Virginia House of Delegates, where he served two terms. He was married to the former Mary Elizabeth Baker, the first wife of Congressman William C. Wampler.
