= Willard Lemmon =

American politician (1924–2012)

Member of the Virginia House of Delegates
- In office January 10, 1968 – January 13, 1982 Serving with George R. C. Stuart (1972–1974); Joseph A. Johnson (1974–1982)
- Preceded by: R. Crockett Gwyn Jr.
- Succeeded by: G. C. Jennings
- Constituency: 60th district (1968–1970); 59th district (1970–1972); 2nd district (1972–1982)

Personal details
- Born: Willard Lincoln Lemmon; September 30, 1924 Marion, Virginia, U.S.
- Died: November 24, 2012 (aged 88) Marion, Virginia, U.S.
- Party: Democratic
- Spouse: Rosa Kevan Rogerson

Military service
- Branch/service: United States Army; Army Ground Forces; Infantry Branch
- Years of service: 1943–1946
- Rank: Sergeant
- Unit: 309th Infantry Regiment, 78th Infantry Division
- Battles/wars: World War II; European theater
- Awards: Bronze Star Medal; Purple Heart

Willard Lincoln Lemmon (September 30, 1924 – November 24, 2012) was an American politician. A member of the Democratic Party, he served in the Virginia House of Delegates from 1968 to 1982.
