= Joseph A. Johnson =

American politician (1917–2007)

Member of the Virginia House of Delegates from the 2nd district
- In office January 9, 1974 – January 12, 1983 Serving with Willard Lemmon (1974–1982); G. C. Jennings (1982–1983)
- Preceded by: George R. C. Stuart
- Succeeded by: John Brown

Personal details
- Born: Joseph Alfred Johnson; October 29, 1917 Mooresville, North Carolina, United States
- Died: December 1, 2007 (aged 90) Abingdon, Virginia, United States
- Party: Democratic
- Spouse: Marian Carleton Eller

Joseph Alfred Johnson (October 29, 1917 – December 1, 2007) was an American politician of the Democratic Party. He served in the Virginia House of Delegates from 1974 to 1983. Running in the redrawn 6th district in 1982, he lost to Republican John Brown by 46 votes.
