= Mark Dudenhefer =

American politician (born 1952)

L. Mark Dudenhefer

Member of the Virginia House of Delegates from the 2nd district
- In office January 13, 2016 – January 10, 2018
- Preceded by: Michael Futrell
- Succeeded by: Jennifer Carroll Foy
- In office January 11, 2012 – January 8, 2014
- Preceded by: Bud Phillips
- Succeeded by: Michael Futrell

Personal details
- Born: Leon Mark Dudenhefer; September 25, 1952 (age 74) Metairie, Louisiana, U.S.
- Party: Republican
- Spouse: LaVera Kay Brooks
- Children: Christian Dudenhefer, Rebecca Craven, Emily Dudenhefer (deceased)
- Education: Louisiana State University; Tulane University; University of Phoenix
- Occupation: Consultant
- Website: va02.com

Military service
- Allegiance: United States
- Branch/service: United States Marine Corps
- Years of service: 1974–2004
- Rank: Colonel

Leon Mark Dudenhefer (born September 25, 1952) is an American politician. A Republican, he was elected to the Virginia House of Delegates in 2011. He represented the 2nd district, made up of parts of Prince William and Stafford counties in Northern Virginia. Previously, he served 2005–2011 on the Stafford County Board of Supervisors, representing the Garrisonville district. After deciding not to seek re-election to the House of Delegates in 2017, he decided to run for the Stafford County Board of Supervisors again, and was elected by a margin of 12 votes.

== Education and family ==
Dudenhefer received a B.S. degree in Economics from the Louisiana State University in 1974. That same year, he enlisted in the United States Marine Corps. He served in the Corps until 2004, rising to the rank of colonel. He also received an M.B.A. degree from Tulane University and a Master's degree in Computer Information Systems from the University of Phoenix.

Dudenhefer married LaVera Kay Brooks; they had three children. One daughter, Emily, died in an automobile accident in 2004.

== Electoral history ==
Date	Election	Candidate	Party	Votes	%
Virginia House of Delegates, 2nd district
Nov 8, 2011	General	L. Mark Dudenhefer	Republican	5,767	56.02
Nov 8, 2011	General	Esteban Garces	Democratic	4,507	43.08
Nov 8, 2011	General	Write Ins		20	0.19
Nov 8, 2011	General	Bud Phillips was redistricted out; seat changed from Democratic to Republican			
Nov 5, 2013	General	Michael T. Futrell	Democratic	8,189	50.56
Nov 5, 2013	General	L. Mark Dudenhefer	Republican	7,966	49.18
Nov 5, 2013	General	Write Ins		43	0.27
Nov 3, 2015	General	L. Mark Dudenhefer	Republican	5,839	50.43
Nov 3, 2015	General	Joshua L. King	Democratic	5,714	49.35
Nov 3, 2015	General	Write Ins		26	0.22

== Political career ==
Dudenhefer served on the Stafford County Board of Supervisors 2005–2011; he was its chair for two years.

When the 2nd House district was moved to his area by redistricting, Dudenhefer was unopposed as the Republican nominee for the seat. He defeated Democrat Esteban Garces in the general election, 5767-4507.

In November 2013, Dudenhefer was unseated by Democratic candidate for Delegate, Michael Futrell.

In November 2015, Dudenhefer reclaimed the seat he lost in 2013, narrowly winning against Democrat Joshua King.

In January 2017, Dudenhefer announced that he would not seek re-election to the Virginia House of Delegates. The next month, he announced he would run for his old seat on the Stafford County Board of Supervisors against Democratic incumbent Laura Sellers. Dudenhefer narrowly defeated Sellers, winning the election by 12 votes.
