= Bud Phillips =

American politician

Member of the Virginia House of Delegates from the 2nd district
- In office January 8, 1992 – January 11, 2012
- Preceded by: J. Jack Kennedy Jr.
- Succeeded by: Mark Dudenhefer

Member of the Virginia House of Delegates from the 3rd district
- In office January 10, 1990 – January 8, 1992
- Preceded by: William F. Green
- Succeeded by: Jackie Stump

Personal details
- Born: Clarence Edward Phillips; April 8, 1950 (age 76) Clintwood, Virginia, U.S.
- Party: Democratic
- Spouse: Teresa Eileen Grizzle
- Children: Aimee Rasnick, Catherine Phillips, Garrett Phillips
- Education: Clinch Valley College (B.A.); East Tennessee State (M.A.)
- Profession: Lawyer

Clarence Edward "Bud" Phillips (born April 8, 1950) is an American politician. A Democrat, he served 11 terms in the Virginia House of Delegates, 1990–2012. He represented a portion of southwestern Virginia that at times included parts of Dickenson, Russell, Tazewell and Wise counties and the independent city of Norton. Phillips elected not to run for a 12th term when his constituency, the 2nd district, was moved to the northern part of the state in a 2011 redistricting.
