= Michael Futrell =

American politician

Member of the Virginia House of Delegates from the 2nd district
- In office January 8, 2014 – January 13, 2016
- Preceded by: Mark Dudenhefer
- Succeeded by: Mark Dudenhefer

Personal details
- Born: Michael Thomas Futrell; January 27, 1982 (age 44) Toledo, Ohio, U.S.
- Party: Democratic
- Website: http://www.michaelfutrell.com

Michael Thomas Futrell (born January 27, 1982) is an American politician from Virginia. A member of the Democratic Party, Futrell served a term in the Virginia House of Delegates, representing the second district.

== Political career ==
Futrell represented the Second District in Virginia's House of Delegates. In 2013 Futrell ran unopposed in the June 11 Democratic primary and defeated incumbent Mark Dudenhefer (R) in the general election on November 5, 2013. In 2015, Futrell served on the following House committees: Finance, Privileges and Elections, and Science and Technology. Futrell sought the Democratic nomination in the 29th District of the Senate of Virginia in the June 2015 primary. After failing to win the senatorial nomination, Futrell announced that he would not seek reelection to the House of Delegates but planned to focus on making an impact in his community in other ways.

While in the House of Delegates, Futrell supported numerous bills. In January 2015, Futrell teamed up with Senator Donald McEachin to introduce the Community Policing Act (Body Camera Bill) in the Senate of Virginia and in the House of Delegates. The bill included establishing and updating a number of minimum training standards for law enforcement agencies across the Commonwealth and developing a comprehensive, statewide, long-range plan for strengthening and improving law enforcement and the administration of criminal justice throughout the Commonwealth with periodic updates to the plan. The bill also included a focus on improving community police relations. While in the House of Delegates Futrell was also a patron of the Ban the Box movement in Virginia. This new practice eliminates from job applications a requirement that applicants disclose felony convictions through marking a checkbox, in order to give each person with a previous felony a better chance to follow a law-abiding life through gainful employment. Futrell also sponsored bills focusing on the state infrastructure fund, various veteran's issues, and reforming healthcare in Virginia.
