= G. C. Jennings =

American politician (1939–2020)

Member of the Virginia House of Delegates
- In office January 13, 1982 – January 12, 1994 Serving with Joseph A. Johnson until 1983
- Preceded by: Willard Lemmon
- Succeeded by: Barney Kidd
- Constituency: 2nd district (1982–1983); 7th district (1983–1992); 5th district (1992–1994)

Personal details
- Born: Grover Cullen Jennings; April 21, 1939 Sugar Grove, Virginia, U.S.
- Died: June 8, 2020 (aged 81) Johnson City, Tennessee, U.S.
- Party: Democratic
- Spouse: Sara Frances Eller
- Parent: W. Pat Jennings (father)
- Education: Virginia Tech (BS); University of Richmond (LLB)

Grover Cullen Jennings (April 21, 1939 – June 8, 2020) was an American attorney and politician who served in the Virginia House of Delegates from 1982 until 1993, when he was defeated for reelection by Barney Kidd. His father, W. Pat Jennings, was a member of the United States House of Representatives.

Jennings was born in Sugar Grove, Virginia and graduated from Marion High School in Marion, Virginia in 1958. He received his bachelor's degree from Virginia Tech in 1962 and his law degree from University of Richmond School of Law in 1965. Jennings practiced law in Marion, Virginia. He died in an automobile accident in Johnson City, Tennessee.
