= Jennifer Carroll Foy =

American politician (born 1981)

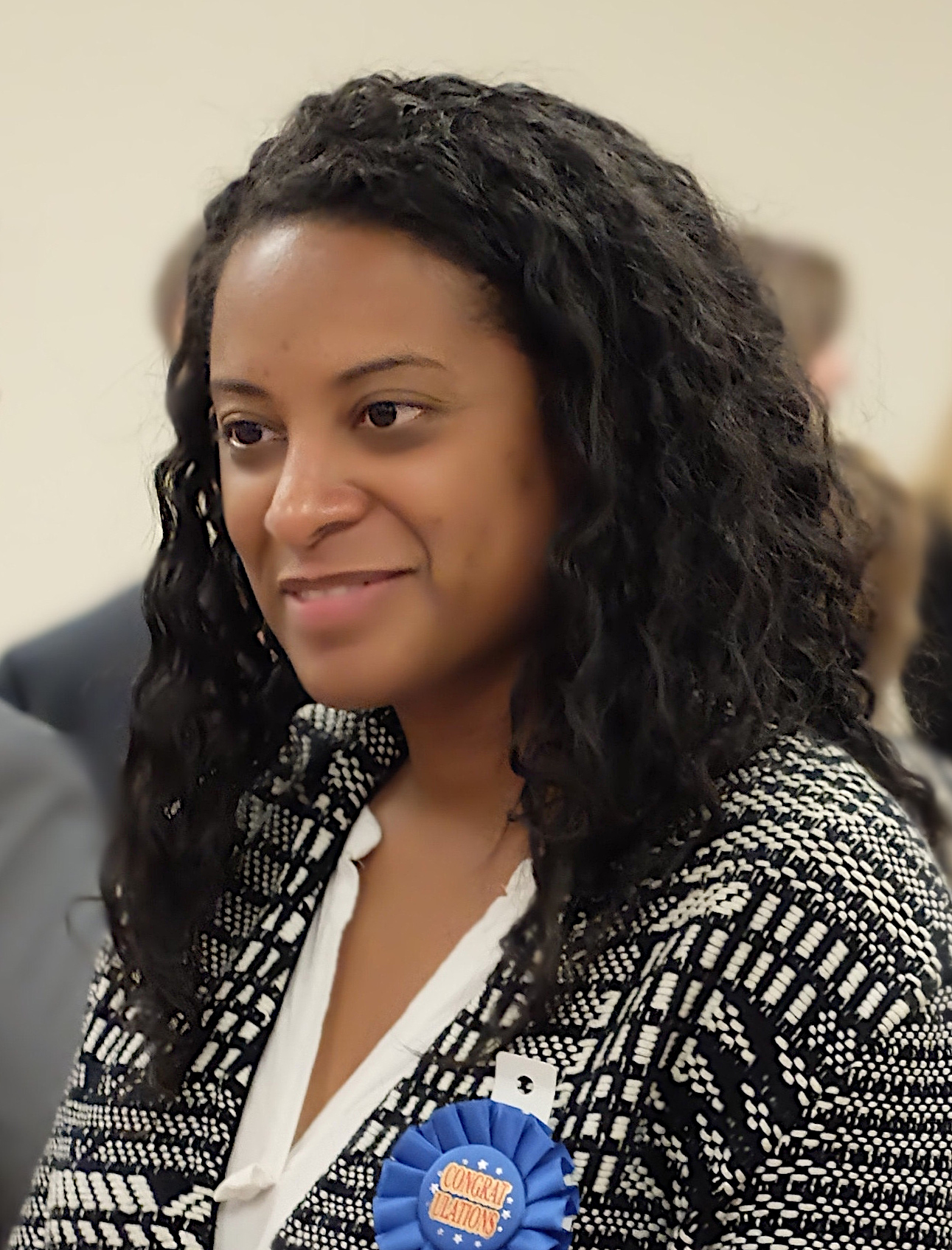
- Carroll Foy in 2017

Member of the Virginia Senate from the 33rd district
- Incumbent
- Assumed office January 10, 2024
- Preceded by: Constituency established

Member of the Virginia House of Delegates from the 2nd district
- In office January 10, 2018 – December 12, 2020
- Preceded by: Mark Dudenhefer
- Succeeded by: Candi Mundon King

Personal details
- Born: Jennifer Denise Carroll; September 25, 1981 (age 44) Petersburg, Virginia, U.S.
- Party: Democratic
- Spouse: Jeffrey Foy
- Children: 2
- Education: Virginia Military Institute (BA); Virginia State University (MA); Thomas Jefferson School of Law (JD)

Jennifer Denise Carroll Foy (born September 25, 1981) is an American politician and public defender serving in the Virginia Senate from the 33rd district since 2024. A Democrat, Carroll Foy previously served in the Virginia House of Delegates representing the 2nd district from 2017 until 2020. She resigned from the position to focus on her campaign for governor in the 2021 primary election, which she lost to Terry McAuliffe. In 2023, she was elected to the Virginia Senate.

== Early life and education ==
Jennifer Carroll Foy was born and grew up in Petersburg, Virginia. Raised by her grandmother, she graduated from Petersburg High School, where she participated in Junior Reserve Officers' Training Corps. She received her bachelor's degree from the Virginia Military Institute (VMI) in 2003. Part of the third class of female cadets to attend the university, she received a full scholarship. Carroll Foy received her master's degree from Virginia State University and a Juris Doctor degree from the Thomas Jefferson School of Law in San Diego.

== Career ==
After graduating from law school, Carroll Foy spent time teaching and worked in Los Angeles as a litigation associate. She moved back to Virginia and opened a private practice that focused on criminal defense.

=== Virginia House of Delegates ===
In February 2017, Carroll Foy entered the race for the Second District seat in the Virginia House of Delegates. In her 2017 campaign, Carroll Foy ran on expanding Medicaid, raising the minimum wage, increasing teacher pay, and criminal justice reform. In November 2017, Carroll Foy beat Republican Mike Makee, and became delegate of Virginia's Second district.

In the House of Delegates, Carroll Foy sat on the Courts of Justice, Finance, and Public Safety Committees.

=== 2021 gubernatorial campaign ===
In 2020, Carroll Foy filed paperwork to seek the Democratic nomination in the 2021 Virginia gubernatorial election. On December 8, 2020, she announced plans to resign from the House of Delegates in order to focus full-time on her gubernatorial campaign. Her resignation came into effect on December 12, 2020. She, like fellow candidate Jennifer McClellan, would've been the first female governor of Virginia, the second African-American governor after Douglas Wilder, and first African-American female governor of the United States if elected. However, former governor Terry McAuliffe won the Democratic primary.

=== Virginia State Senate ===
In 2023, she was elected to the Virginia Senate, defeating former delegate Hala Ayala in the Democratic primary with 62.85% and Republican candidate Michael Van Meter with nearly 63% of the vote in the general election.

== Political positions ==
=== Healthcare ===
Carroll Foy voted to pass Medicaid expansion in the General Assembly in March 2018, expanding health insurance coverage for 400,000 Virginians.

=== Women's rights ===
Carroll Foy proposed and passed the Equal Rights Amendment, making Virginia the 38th state to ratify the constitutional amendment.

=== Criminal justice ===
A public defender, Carroll Foy has advocated for the reform of cash bail, criticizing what she called Virginia's "justice-for-profit system".

Carroll Foy initially abstained from voting on a 2020 proposal to reduce prison sentences, bringing Virginia's "earned sentence credit" program in line with other states. She eventually voted in favor of a significantly more conservative version of the bills.

=== Redistricting ===
Carroll Foy supports third-party, commission-drawn legislative maps but opposed the amendment to the state constitution as proposed in 2020, saying she felt it was wrong to inscribe a “substandard” proposal in the constitution.

=== Labor ===
Carroll Foy has been an advocate for paid family and medical leave for all workers. In December 2025, Carroll Foy filed a bill to repeal the right-to-work law in Virginia.

=== Infrastructure ===
Carroll Foy supports efforts to expand broadband access, particularly to southwest Virginia.

=== Environment and climate change ===
Carroll Foy was a chief co-patron of the Virginia Clean Economy Act, which aims to shift Virginia's energy reliance to solely renewable sources over the next few decades

== Personal life ==
She is married to Jeffrey Foy, whom she met at VMI. In July 2017, she gave birth to twin boys.

== Electoral history ==
Date	Election	Candidate	Party	Votes	%
Virginia House of Delegates, 2nd district
June 13, 2017	Primary	Jennifer Carroll Foy	Democratic	2,182	50.14%
June 13, 2017	Primary	Josh King	Democratic	2,170	49.86%
Nov 7, 2017	General	Jennifer Carroll Foy	Democratic	13,366	63.04%
Nov 7, 2017	General	Mike Makee	Republican	7,803	36.80%
Nov 5, 2019	General	Jennifer Carroll Foy	Democratic	11,828	60.92%
Nov 5, 2019	General	Heather Mitchell	Republican	7,563	38.95%
Democratic primary for Governor of Virginia
June 8, 2021	Primary	Terry McAuliffe	Democratic	300,236	62.17%
June 8, 2021	Primary	Jennifer Carroll Foy	Democratic	95,873	19.85%
June 8, 2021	Primary	Jennifer McClellan	Democratic	56,258	11.65%
June 8, 2021	Primary	Justin Fairfax	Democratic	17,106	3.54%
June 8, 2021	Primary	Lee J. Carter	Democratic	13,446	2.78%
Virginia Senate, 33rd district
June 20, 2023	Primary				
June 20, 2023	Primary	Jennifer Carroll Foy	Democratic	9,627	62.85%
June 20, 2023	Primary	Hala Ayala	Democratic	5,691	36.85%
November 7, 2023	General				
November 7, 2023	General	Jennifer Carroll Foy	Democratic	35,003	62.85%
November 7, 2023	General	Mike L. Van Meter	Republican	20,525	36.85%

Virginia House of Delegates
Preceded by Mark Dudenhefer	Member of the Virginia House of Delegates from the 2nd district 2018–2020	Succeeded by Candi Mundon King
Senate of Virginia
Preceded by Jennifer Boysko	Member of the Virginia Senate from the 33rd district 2024–Present	Incumbent
