= Virginia's 2nd House of Delegates district =

Virginia legislative district

Virginia's 2nd State House of Delegates district
- District map from the 2023 election
Delegate
Adele McClure; D–Arlington
- Demographics: 59% White; 9% Black; 13% Hispanic; 13% Asian; 0% Native American; 0% Hawaiian/Pacific Islander; 1% Other; 5% Multiracial
- Population (2024) • Voting age: 81,865; 18
- Registered voters: 67,177

Virginia's 2nd House of Delegates district is one of 100 seats in the Virginia House of Delegates, the lower house of the state's bicameral legislature. District 2 represents part of Arlington county. The seat is currently held by Democrat Adele McClure.

== Elections ==
=== 2017 ===
The seat was previously held by Republican L. Mark Dudenhefer. He announced in January 2017 he would not seek reelection. Democrat Jennifer Carroll Foy won the June 2017 primary to become the Democratic candidate. She initially faced Republican Laquan Austion; however he withdrew from the race in August 2017. Republicans selected Michael Makee to run instead. Carroll Foy won the November general election.

=== 2019 ===
Carroll Foy was re-elected.

=== 2021 special election ===
Carroll Foy resigned effective December 12, 2020, to focus on her campaign for the 2021 Virginia gubernatorial election. Democrat Candi King won an election to fill the seat on January 5, 2021.

== District officeholders ==
Years	Delegate	Party	Electoral history
January 13, 1982 – January 12, 1983	Joseph A. Johnson	Democratic	
January 13, 1982 – January 12, 1983	Grover Jennings	Democratic	
January 12, 1983 – January 13, 1988	James W. Robinson	Democratic	Lost primary election
January 13, 1988 – June 1991	J. Jack Kennedy Jr.	Democratic	Resigned upon special election to Senate
January 8, 1992 – January 11, 2012	Bud Phillips	Democratic	Retired following redistricting
January 11, 2012 – January 8, 2014	Mark Dudenhefer	Republican	Defeated in bid for reelection
January 8, 2014 – January 13, 2016	Michael Futrell	Democratic	Defeated in bid for reelection
January 13, 2016 – January 10, 2018	Mark Dudenhefer	Republican	Declined to seek reelection
January 10, 2018 – December 12, 2020	Jennifer Carroll Foy	Democratic	Resigned to run for Governor.
January 13, 2021 – January 10, 2024	Candi King	Democratic	First elected in 2021. Redistricted to the 23rd District.
January 10, 2024 – present	Adele Y. McClure	Democratic	First elected in 2023.

== Electoral history ==
Date	Election	Candidate	Party	Votes	%
Virginia House of Delegates, 2nd district
Nov 6, 2001	General	C. E. Phillips	Democratic	11,330	99.8
Nov 6, 2001	General	Write Ins		28	0.2
Nov 4, 2003	General	C. E. Phillips	Democratic	13,195	99.7
Nov 4, 2003	General	Write Ins		41	0.3
Nov 8, 2005	General	C. E. Phillips	Democratic	11,867	64.1
Nov 8, 2005	General	L. G. Tiller	Republican	6,650	35.9
Nov 8, 2005	General	Write Ins		4	0
Nov 6, 2007	General	Clarence Bud E. Phillips	Democratic	14,385	99.1
Nov 6, 2007	General	Write Ins		127	0.9
Nov 3, 2009	General	Clarence Bud E. Phillips	Democratic	11,283	90.1
Nov 3, 2009	General	Write Ins		1,236	9.9
Nov 8, 2011	General	Leon Mark Dudenhefer	Republican	5,767	56.0
Nov 8, 2011	General	Esteban Garces	Democratic	4,507	43.8
Nov 8, 2011	General	Write Ins		20	0.2
Nov 5, 2013	General	Michael Thomas Futrell	Democratic	8,189	50.6
Nov 5, 2013	General	Leon Mark Dudenhefer	Republican	7,966	49.2
Nov 5, 2013	General	Write Ins		43	0.3
Nov 3, 2015	General	Leon Mark Dudenhefer	Republican	5,839	50.4
Nov 3, 2015	General	Esteban Garces	Democratic	5,714	49.3
Nov 3, 2015	General	Write Ins		30	0.3
Nov 7, 2017	General	Jennifer Denise Carroll Foy	Democratic	13,366	63.0
Nov 7, 2017	General	Michael David Makee	Republican	7,803	36.8
Nov 7, 2017	General	Write Ins		34	0.2
Nov 5, 2019	General	Jennifer Denise Carroll Foy	Democratic	11,828	60.6
Nov 5, 2019	General	Heather Funderburk Mitchell	Republican	7,563	38.7
Nov 5, 2019	General	Write Ins		139	0.7
Jan 5, 2021	Special	Candi Patrice Mundon King	Democratic	4,451	51.7
Jan 5, 2021	Special	Heather Funderburk Mitchell	Republican	4,143	48.2
Jan 5, 2021	Special	Write Ins		9	0.1
Nov 2, 2021	General	Candi Patrice Mundon King	Democratic	15,310	57.2
Nov 2, 2021	General	Gina Renee Ciarcia	Republican	11,393	42.6
Nov 2, 2021	General	Write Ins		60	0.2
Nov 7, 2023	General	Adele Y. McClure	Democratic	17,409	95.3
Nov 7, 2023	General	Write Ins		859	4.7
