= 2013 Virginia elections =

- November 5, 2013

The following offices were up for election in the United States Commonwealth of Virginia in the November 5, 2013 general election. The Republican Party selected its statewide ticket at a convention in May 2013. Primaries were held on June 11, 2013, in which the Democratic Party selected its ticket, and contested races for party nominations were decided.

Democrat Terry McAuliffe was elected governor with 48% of the vote to 45% for Republican Ken Cuccinelli. Democrat Ralph Northam was elected lieutenant governor with 55% of the vote to 45% for Republican E.W. Jackson. In the attorney general election, Democrat Mark Herring beat Republican Mark Obenshain by 1,103,777 votes to 1,103,612 – a difference of 165 votes out of more than 2.2 million cast, or 0.007%. After a recount, Obenshain conceded the election on December 18, and later that day, the recount ended with Herring winning by 907 votes, or 0.04%. With Herring's victory, Democrats held all five statewide offices — including both U.S. Senate seats — for the first time since 1970.

== Governor ==
The incumbent governor, Republican Bob McDonnell, was not eligible to run for re-election due to term limits established by the Virginia Constitution. Virginia is the only state that prohibits its governor from serving immediate successive terms.

=== Republican candidates ===
Lieutenant Governor Bill Bolling and Attorney General Ken Cuccinelli had both indicated that they were running for the Republican Party's nomination for governor. Bolling withdrew from the race on November 28, 2012, making Cuccinelli the de facto nominee. Cuccinelli was formally nominated at the state convention on May 18, 2013.

=== Democratic candidates ===
Terry McAuliffe, former chairman of the Democratic National Committee and a candidate in the Democratic gubernatorial primary in 2009, declared his intent to again seek the Democratic nomination in November 2012.

On April 2, 2013, the Democratic Party of Virginia certified that McAuliffe was the only candidate to file for the June primary, and was therefore the Democratic nominee.

=== Libertarian candidate ===
Robert Sarvis, a lawyer and businessman, was nominated as the Libertarian Party of Virginia's official candidate on April 21, 2013, at a special convention.

Sarvis' campaign submitted over 17,000 signatures to meet the Virginia State Board of Elections requirement of 10,000 valid signatures. On June 26, 2013, the SBE confirmed to Sarvis' campaign that he would be listed on the ballot. This makes Sarvis the fourth minor party gubernatorial nominee to get on the Virginia ballot in the last 40 years.

=== General election ===
==== Results ====
Virginia gubernatorial election, 2013
Party	Candidate	Votes	%	±%
Democratic	Terry McAuliffe	1,069,859	47.75%	+6.49%
Republican	Ken Cuccinelli	1,013,354	45.23%	−13.38%
Libertarian	Robert Sarvis	146,084	6.52%	+6.52%
Write-ins		11,087	0.49%	
Plurality		56,435	2.52%	−14.86%
Turnout		2,240,314	100.00%	
Democratic gain from Republican		Swing		

== Lieutenant governor ==
After Republicans took two seats in the Virginia Senate in the 2011 elections to bring the Senate to a 20–20 tie, Republican Lieutenant Governor Bill Bolling gained significant power with his tie-breaking vote. The Washington Post reported in November 2011 that this led to increased interest and speculation as to who would run for the post in 2013.

=== Republican candidates ===
E. W. Jackson, a pastor, conservative activist and candidate for the U.S. Senate in 2012, was nominated after four ballots at the Republican convention. He defeated former state senator Jeannemarie Devolites Davis, State Delegate Scott Lingamfelter, State Senator Steve Martin, Prince William Board of County Supervisors Chairman Corey Stewart, Stafford County Board of Supervisors Chairwoman Susan B. Stimpson and venture capitalist and Fox News commentator Pete Snyder.

=== Democratic candidates ===
In the June primary, State Senator Ralph Northam defeated Aneesh Chopra, former Chief Technology Officer of the United States and Secretary of Technology under Governor Tim Kaine.

=== General election ===
==== Results ====
Virginia lieutenant gubernatorial election, 2013
Party	Candidate	Votes	%	±%
Democratic	Ralph Northam	1,213,155	55.12%	
Republican	E.W. Jackson	980,257	44.54%	
Write-ins		7,472	0.34%	
Majority		232,898	10.58%	
Turnout		2,200,884		
Democratic gain from Republican		Swing		

== Attorney General ==
Incumbent attorney general Ken Cuccinelli did not run for re-election. The race was the most competitive of the three Virginia statewide elections. The Virginia State Board of Elections initially reported that Herring led Obenshain by 1,103,777 votes to 1,103,612 – a difference of 165 votes out of more than 2.2 million cast. The results were certified on November 25, declaring Herring as the winner by 165 votes. Obenshain requested a recount, and conceded on December 18, 2013, after Herring's lead grew in the recount to 810 votes.

=== Republican candidates ===
On May 18, 2013, a Republican state convention in Richmond nominated state Senator Mark Obenshain of Harrisonburg over state Delegate Rob Bell.

=== Democratic candidates ===
The Democratic primary was won by State Senator Mark Herring, who defeated former Assistant United States Attorney Justin Fairfax.

=== Results ===
The results were certified on November 25, 2013. Obenshain requested a recount due to the close race, as allowed for by Virginia law when the margin is under 1%. After the recount did not change the results substantially, Obenshain conceded on December 18, 2013.

Virginia Attorney General election, 2013
Party	Candidate	Votes	%	±%
Democratic	Mark Herring	1,105,045	49.91%	+7.62%
Republican	Mark Obenshain	1,104,138	49.87%	−7.64%
Write-ins		4,892	0.22%	+0.13%
Plurality		907	0.04%	
Turnout		2,214,075		
Democratic gain from Republican		Swing		

== House of Delegates ==
Republicans currently hold 68 seats and Democrats hold 32 seats in the 100-seat House of Delegates.

=== Primaries ===
Four incumbent Republicans were challenged in primaries that centered around Gov. McDonnell's controversial transportation funding overhaul that imposed a $1.2 billion per year tax increase. 34 House Republicans voted for the bill, causing an uproar amongst conservatives. No sitting Republican delegate had faced a primary challenge since 2005. In the June 11, 2013 primary, two veteran Republicans who supported the transportation plan were defeated: businessman Dave LaRock beat 33rd District Del. Joe T. May 57%-43%, and physician Mark Berg ousted 29th District Del. Beverly Sherwood by a 51%-49% margin. Both May and Sherwood held committee chairmanships; their ouster opens the chairmanships of the Transportation Committee (chaired by May) and the Agriculture, Chesapeake and Natural Resources Committee (chaired by Sherwood). House Speaker Bill Howell and Del. Bobby Orrock handily defeated their primary challengers.

In the Democratic primaries, Del. Rosalyn Dance staved off a challenge from Evandra Thompson, who said Dance voted with Republicans too often, winning by less than 300 votes. Del. Algie Howell easily beat his primary challenger.

=== Open seats ===
- In the 4th District, incumbent Democrat Joseph P. Johnson was retiring. Republican Ben Chafin, an attorney and farmer, ran unopposed as no Democrats filed to run for the seat.
- In the 6th District, incumbent Republican Anne B. Crockett-Stark was also retiring. Jeff Campbell, former mayor of Saltville, was the Republican nominee, having won the primary with 71% of the vote. Attorney and former Carroll County Democratic Party chairman Jonathan McGrady was the Democratic nominee. Campbell won the general election with 57% of the vote.
- In the 16th District, incumbent Republican Donald Merricks chose not to run for re-election to focus on his business. Les Adams, an attorney and former Pittsylvania County prosecutor, was the Republican nominee and was to have run unopposed in the general election. Elizabeth Jones ultimately ran as the Democratic nominee, though lost to Adams' 63% of the vote.
- In the 19th District, the longest-serving member in the history of the House of Delegates, Lacey Putney, an independent who caucused with the Republicans, decided to retire. Botetourt County Board of Supervisors member Terry Austin won the Republican nomination at a party canvass in May, and faced Democratic businessman Lewis Medlin, as well as Constitution Party nominee Joshua Ball in the general election. Austin won with 70% of the vote.
- In the 53rd District, incumbent Democrat Jim Scott was retiring. Scott's former aide Marcus Simon was the Democratic nominee for the seat. Small business owner Brad Tidwell was the Republican nominee. Libertarian Party candidate Anthony Gabriel Tellez also appeared on the November ballot. Simon won the general election with nearly 67% of the vote.
- In the 55th District, incumbent Republican John Cox was retiring. Running to succeed him were Republican Buddy Fowler, a Republican activist and former Cox aide; Democrat Toni Radler, an activist; and Libertarian Christopher Sullivan, a farmer. Fowler won the general election with 57% of the vote.
- In the 82nd District, incumbent Republican Harry "Bob" Purkey decided not to seek re-election. Virginia Beach city councilman Bill DeSteph was the Republican nominee. Democrat Bill Fleming, who was defeated in a January 2010 state Senate special election by Sen. Jeff McWaters, was the Democratic nominee. DeSteph won the general election with 60% of the vote.
- In the 84th District, incumbent Republican Sal Iaquinto was resigning to accept an appointment to serve as an interim judge on the Virginia Beach General District Court. Republican Virginia Beach city councilman Glenn Davis and Democrat Brent McKenzie, a former Virginia Beach school board member, ran to replace him, with Davis taking 57% of the general election vote.
- In the 85th District, incumbent Republican Bob Tata was retiring. Businessman and former Navy SEAL Scott Taylor won a three-way primary for the Republican nomination. 2012 Virginia Beach city council candidate Bill Dale was the Democratic nominee. Taylor won the general election with 57% of the vote.

=== Incumbents losing reelection ===
Two incumbents lost reelection. Democrat Monty Mason defeated Republican Michael B. Watson in the 93rd district, while Democrat Michael Futrell defeated Republican Mark Dudenhefer in the second district.
