= 2013 Virginia lieutenant gubernatorial election =

- November 5, 2013
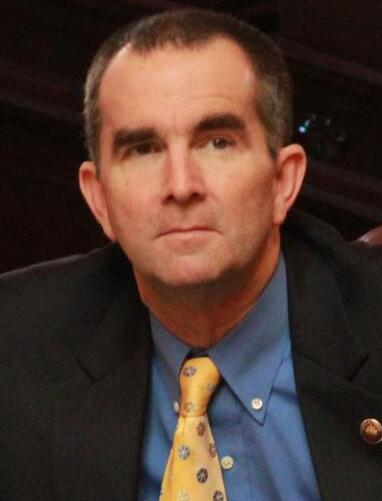

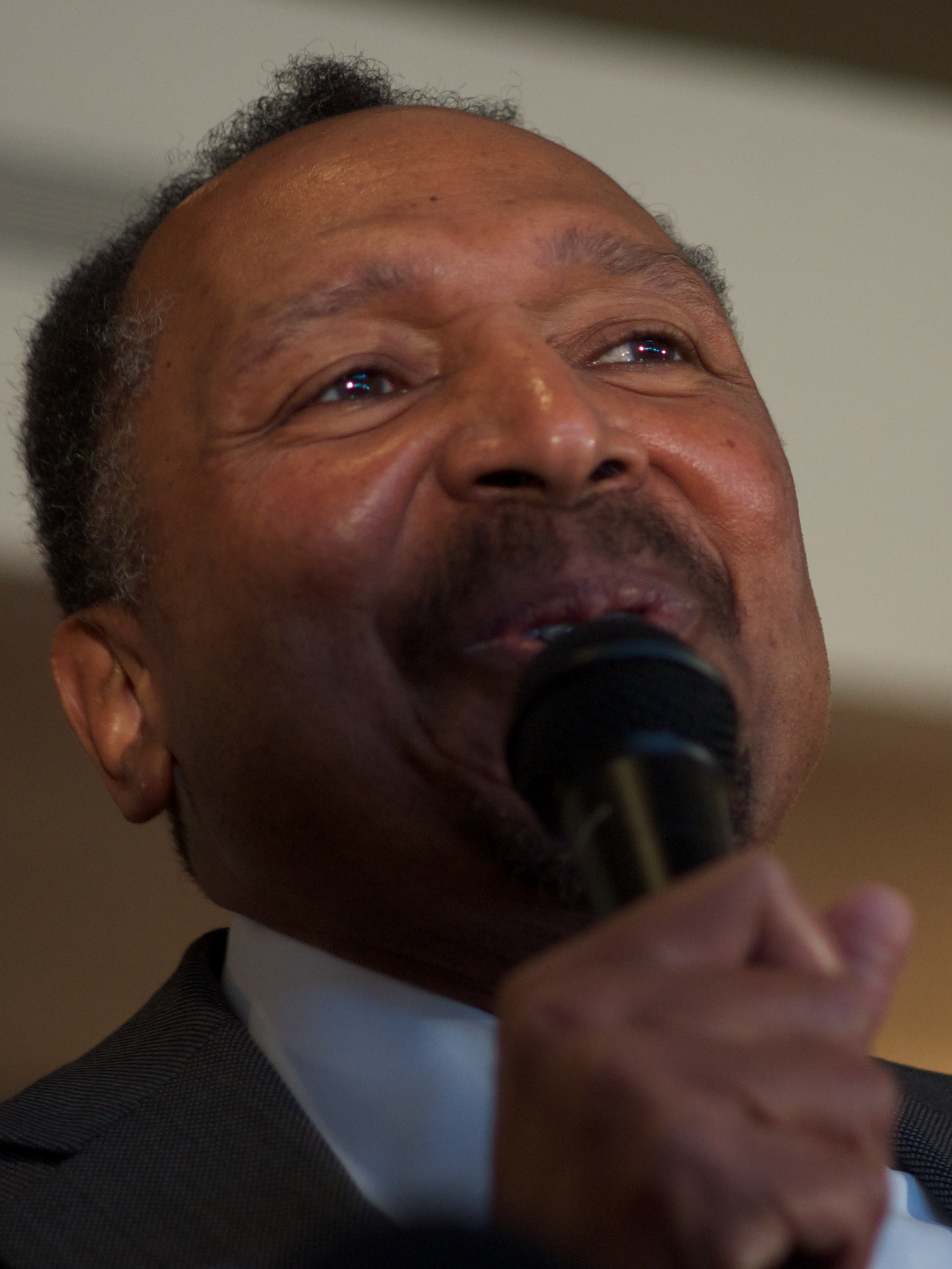
Nominee	Ralph Northam	E. W. Jackson
Party	Democratic	Republican
Popular vote	1,213,155	980,257
Percentage	55.12%	44.54%
- Northam: 40–50% 50–60% 60–70% 70–80% 80–90% >90% Jackson: 40–50% 50–60% 60–70% 70–80% 80–90% >90% No votes
Lieutenant Governor before election
Bill Bolling
Republican
Elected Lieutenant Governor
Ralph Northam
Democratic

The 2013 Virginia lieutenant gubernatorial election took place on November 5, 2013, to elect the Lieutenant Governor of Virginia. The incumbent Lieutenant Governor, Republican Bill Bolling, had originally planned to run for Governor of Virginia in the 2013 gubernatorial election, but withdrew upon the entry of Attorney General Ken Cuccinelli.

On May 18, 2013, a Republican state convention in Richmond nominated minister and conservative activist E.W. Jackson over six others after four ballots. The Democratic primary on June 11, 2013, was won by State Senator Ralph Northam, who defeated Aneesh Chopra, former Chief Technology Officer of the United States. Northam then defeated Jackson by a wide margin in the general election.

As the Senate of Virginia was evenly split between 20 Democrats and 20 Republicans, the lieutenant gubernatorial election effectively decided which party had control of that chamber.

== Background ==
In early 2008, Bolling and then-Attorney General Bob McDonnell struck a deal in which Bolling agreed to run for re-election as lieutenant governor to allow McDonnell to run unopposed for governor in 2009, in exchange for McDonnell's support for Bolling for governor in 2013. The deal was widely known and as such, Bolling was effectively running for governor since 2009, and in April 2010, Bolling filed the necessary paperwork to run in 2013. Virginia Attorney General Ken Cuccinelli, elected alongside McDonnell and Bolling in 2009, stated that he intended to run for re-election as attorney general in 2013, but did not rule out running for governor. In December 2011, Cuccinelli announced to his staff that he would run against Bolling for governor in 2013; the news went public, and in response, Bolling issued a statement accusing Cuccinelli of putting "his own personal ambition ahead of the best interests of the commonwealth and the Republican Party." Cuccinelli's announcement came two days before the annual statewide conference of Virginia Republicans, at which Bolling and his staff expressed being upset with Cuccinelli's decision.

Bolling, who was polling poorly against Cuccinelli, withdrew from the race on November 28, 2012. He cited the Republican Party's decision to move to a nominating convention rather than hold a primary. He ruled out running for another term as lieutenant governor and refused to endorse Cuccinelli.

== Republican nomination ==
The Republican Party chose its nominee at a convention in Richmond. Seven candidates were running, and after four rounds of balloting, E.W. Jackson was chosen as the nominee.

=== Candidates ===
==== Nominated at convention ====
- E. W. Jackson, pastor, conservative activist, former United States Marine Corps Corporal and candidate for the U.S. Senate in 2012

==== Defeated at convention ====
- Jeannemarie Devolites Davis, former state senator
- Scott Lingamfelter, state representative
- Steve Martin, state senator
- Corey Stewart, Chairman of the Prince William Board of County Supervisors
- Susan Stimpson, Chairwoman of the Stafford County Board of Supervisors
- Pete Snyder, venture capitalist and Fox News commentator

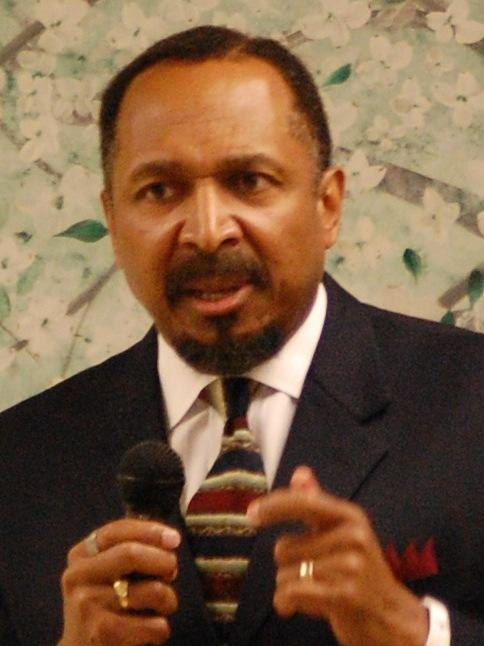
Pastor E. W. Jackson in 2010

==== Declined ====
- Bill Bolling, incumbent lieutenant governor
- Keith Fimian, businessman and nominee for Virginia's 11th congressional district in 2008 and 2010
- Jeff McWaters, state senator
- Jamie Radtke, co-founder of the Virginia Tea Party Patriots and candidate for the U.S. Senate in 2012

== Democratic primary ==
The Virginia Democratic primary was held on June 11, 2013. Ralph Northam was chosen as the nominee.

=== Candidates ===
==== Declared ====
- Aneesh Chopra, former Chief Technology Officer of the United States
- Ralph Northam, State Senator and former United States Army Major

==== Declined ====
- Kenneth Cooper Alexander, state senator
- Ward Armstrong, former Minority Leader of the Virginia House of Delegates
- David A. Bowers, Mayor of Roanoke
- Paula Miller, former state representative

=== Polling ===
Poll source	Date(s) administered	Sample size	Margin of error	Aneesh Chopra	Ralph Northam	Other	Undecided
Public Policy Polling	May 24–26, 2013	322	± 5.5%	27%	18%	—	54%

=== Results ===
Results by county and independent city: Northam: Northam—90–100%; Northam—80–90%; Northam—70–80%; Northam—60–70%; Northam—50–60%; Tie: Tie; Chopra: Chopra—50–60%; Chopra—60–70%

Virginia Lieutenant Governor Democratic primary, 2013
Party	Candidate	Votes	%	±%
Democratic	Ralph Northam	78,337	54.24%	
Democratic	Aneesh Chopra	66,098	45.76%	
Majority		12,239	8.47%	
Turnout		144,435		

== General election ==
=== September debate ===
The two candidates met in a debate held in Arlington on September 24, 2013. The debate was marked by sharp contrasts between the candidates on both issues and style. Northam was the aggressor in the debate, attacking Jackson over his controversial statements and personal history.

In response to repeated attacks from Northam on Jackson's history of controversial statements, Jackson read aloud a section of the Virginia Constitution that differentiates social opinions from one's ability to govern. Jackson said, "I know the difference between what I do [in church] and what I'm required to do here. ... If I'm elected, I'm going to serve all the people of Virginia regardless of what their religious background is. ... I'm not running to be preacher, theologian, bishop, pastor of Virginia. I'm running to be lieutenant governor of Virginia."

Northam spoke at length on abortion, saying regulations and laws on abortion recently passed by the General Assembly represented "an assault on women's reproductive health care," and attacked Jackson for his support of those regulations and laws. Jackson responded simply, "I am unabashedly pro-life. I make no apologies for that."

Jackson said he opposed a Medicaid expansion in Virginia, saying it would saddle Virginia with debt. Northam said he supported the expansion because if Virginia rejected it, the taxes it pays to the federal government would go to other states.

Both candidates sought to speak more personally about themselves. Northam talked about his career in the military and medicine, while Jackson talked about getting through a rough childhood to attend Harvard Law School and eventually entering ministry.

=== Endorsements ===
E.W. Jackson

Current and former politicians

- Tony Wilt, Republican member of the Virginia House of Delegates

Organizations

- Fraternal Order of Police
- Gun Owners of America
- NRA Political Victory Fund
- Police Benevolent Association

Others

- Morgan Shepherd, Retired Nascar Driver and 1980 NASCAR Late Model Sportsman Division Champion
Ralph Northam

Current and former politicians

- Rick Boucher, former U.S. Representative for Virginia's 9th congressional district

Organizations

- Fairfax County Chamber of Commerce
- Virginia Association of Realtors
- Virginia Farm Bureau Federation

Newspapers

- Daily Press
- Falls Church News-Press
- The Richmond Times-Dispatch
- The Virginian-Pilot
- The Washington Post

=== Predictions ===
Source	Ranking	As of
Sabato's Crystal Ball	Safe D (flip)	October 24, 2013

=== Polling ===
Poll source	Date(s) administered	Sample size	Margin of error	E.W. Jackson (R)	Ralph Northam (D)	Other	Undecided
Public Policy Polling	November 2–3, 2013	870	± 3.3%	39%	52%	—	9%
Christopher Newport University	October 25–30, 2013	1,038	± 3%	35%	51%	—	15%
Hampton University	October 24, 26–27, 2013	800	± 2.9%	37%	43%	—	20%
Washington Post/Abt SRBI	October 24–27, 2013	762	± 4.5%	39%	52%	—	9%
Roanoke College	October 21–27, 2013	838	± 3.4%	32%	48%	—	21%
NBC News/Marist	October 13–15, 2013	596	± 4%	42%	48%	1%	9%
Watson Center/CNU	October 8–13, 2013	753	± 3.6%	39%	51%	—	10%
Watson Center/CNU	October 1–6, 2013	886	± 3.1%	37%	48%	—	16%
Roanoke College	September 30 – October 5, 2013	1,046	± 3%	35%	39%	—	26%
Hampton University	September 25–29, 2013	800	± 2.9%	39%	38%	—	23%
University of Mary Washington	September 25–29, 2013	559	± 4.7%	35%	39%	7%	18%
Washington Post/Abt SRBI	September 19–22, 2013	562	± 5%	42%	45%	—	14%
Conquest Communications	September 19, 2013	400	± 5%	29%	31%	—	40%
NBC/Marist	September 17–19, 2013	546	± 3%	41%	44%	—	15%
Roanoke College	September 9–15, 2013	874	± 3.3%	30%	34%	—	33%
Public Policy Polling	July 11–14, 2013	601	± 4%	35%	42%	—	23%
Roanoke College	July 8–14, 2013	525	± 4.3%	28%	30%	—	41%
Public Policy Polling	May 24–26, 2013	672	± 3.8%	29%	35%	—	36%

Hypothetical polling

Poll source	Date(s) administered	Sample size	Margin of error	E.W. Jackson (R)	Aneesh Chopra (D)	Undecided
Public Policy Polling	May 24–26, 2013	672	± 3.8%	29%	36%	35%

=== Results ===
2013 Virginia lieutenant gubernatorial election
Party	Candidate	Votes	%	±%
Democratic	Ralph Northam	1,213,155	55.12%	+11.72
Republican	E. W. Jackson	980,257	44.54%	−11.97
Write-in		7,472	0.34%	+0.26
Total votes		2,200,884	100.00%	N/A
Democratic gain from Republican				

==== By county and independent city ====
Locality	E. W. Jackson Republican		Ralph Northam Democratic		Write-in Various		Margin		Totals
Locality	#	%	#	%	#	%	#	%	Totals
Accomack	3,938	43.37%	5,136	56.57%	5	0.06%	1,198	13.20%	9,079
Albemarle	13,737	39.96%	20,570	59.84%	69	0.20%	6,833	19.88%	34,376
Alexandria	9,163	22.62%	31,047	76.63%	304	0.75%	21,884	54.02%	40,514
Alleghany	1,766	43.75%	2,261	56.01%	10	0.25%	495	12.26%	4,037
Amelia	2,470	59.48%	1,679	40.43%	4	0.10%	−791	−19.05%	4,153
Amherst	4,981	56.63%	3,795	43.15%	19	0.22%	−1,186	−13.48%	8,795
Appomattox	3,192	64.29%	1,757	35.39%	16	0.32%	−1,435	−28.90%	4,965
Arlington	14,843	22.37%	51,115	77.02%	406	0.61%	36,272	54.66%	66,364
Augusta	14,054	70.93%	5,717	28.85%	42	0.21%	−8,337	−42.08%	19,813
Bath	639	53.83%	546	46.00%	2	0.17%	−93	−7.83%	1,187
Bedford	16,669	67.64%	7,931	32.18%	43	0.17%	−8,738	−35.46%	24,643
Bland	1,251	70.24%	524	29.42%	6	0.34%	−727	−40.82%	1,781
Botetourt	7,160	63.91%	4,006	35.76%	37	0.33%	−3,154	−28.15%	11,203
Bristol	2,595	66.54%	1,297	33.26%	8	0.21%	−1,298	−33.28%	3,900
Brunswick	1,414	31.83%	3,025	68.08%	4	0.09%	1,611	36.26%	4,443
Buchanan	3,084	65.94%	1,588	33.95%	5	0.11%	−1,496	−31.99%	4,677
Buckingham	1,934	48.01%	2,084	51.74%	10	0.25%	150	3.72%	4,028
Buena Vista	657	53.81%	562	46.03%	2	0.16%	−95	−7.78%	1,221
Campbell	10,268	66.54%	5,134	33.27%	30	0.19%	−5,134	−33.27%	15,432
Caroline	3,278	42.66%	4,373	56.91%	33	0.43%	1,095	14.25%	7,684
Carroll	4,885	63.81%	2,757	36.02%	13	0.17%	−2,128	−27.80%	7,655
Charles City	805	32.28%	1,683	67.48%	6	0.24%	878	35.20%	2,494
Charlotte	1,947	53.84%	1,662	45.96%	7	0.19%	−285	−7.88%	3,616
Charlottesville	2,273	18.57%	9,929	81.10%	41	0.33%	7,656	62.53%	12,243
Chesapeake	28,370	45.34%	34,043	54.41%	153	0.24%	5,673	9.07%	62,566
Chesterfield	48,339	46.88%	54,135	52.50%	635	0.62%	5,796	5.62%	103,109
Clarke	2,573	53.08%	2,266	46.75%	8	0.17%	−307	−6.33%	4,847
Colonial Heights	2,929	59.87%	1,943	39.72%	20	0.41%	−986	−20.16%	4,892
Covington	471	38.26%	757	61.49%	3	0.24%	286	23.23%	1,231
Craig	982	61.68%	606	38.07%	4	0.25%	−376	−23.62%	1,592
Culpeper	7,172	60.77%	4,606	39.03%	23	0.19%	−2,566	−21.74%	11,801
Cumberland	1,370	48.26%	1,463	51.53%	6	0.21%	93	3.28%	2,839
Danville	4,566	44.94%	5,585	54.97%	9	0.09%	1,019	10.03%	10,160
Dickenson	2,077	62.07%	1,264	37.78%	5	0.15%	−813	−24.30%	3,346
Dinwiddie	3,205	43.81%	4,091	55.93%	19	0.26%	886	12.11%	7,315
Emporia	504	31.98%	1,070	67.89%	2	0.13%	566	35.91%	1,576
Essex	1,372	45.07%	1,669	54.83%	3	0.10%	297	9.76%	3,044
Fairfax City	2,661	37.78%	4,355	61.83%	27	0.38%	1,694	24.05%	7,043
Fairfax County	108,222	35.81%	192,855	63.81%	1,173	0.39%	84,633	28.00%	302,250
Falls Church	1,159	23.78%	3,695	75.81%	20	0.41%	2,536	52.03%	4,874
Fauquier	12,267	59.02%	8,468	40.74%	51	0.25%	−3,799	−18.28%	20,786
Floyd	2,516	56.12%	1,959	43.70%	8	0.18%	−557	−12.42%	4,483
Fluvanna	4,034	52.07%	3,699	47.74%	15	0.19%	−335	−4.32%	7,748
Franklin City	752	32.92%	1,526	66.81%	6	0.26%	774	33.89%	2,284
Franklin County	9,360	58.84%	6,513	40.94%	35	0.22%	−2,847	−17.90%	15,908
Frederick	12,890	63.59%	7,328	36.15%	52	0.26%	−5,562	−27.44%	20,270
Fredericksburg	2,107	35.30%	3,844	64.41%	17	0.28%	1,737	29.11%	5,968
Galax	706	56.34%	544	43.42%	3	0.24%	−162	−12.93%	1,253
Giles	2,658	55.71%	2,106	44.14%	7	0.15%	−552	−11.57%	4,771
Gloucester	6,343	57.16%	4,738	42.70%	15	0.14%	−1,605	−14.46%	11,096
Goochland	4,669	51.97%	4,262	47.44%	53	0.59%	−407	−4.53%	8,984
Grayson	2,962	63.41%	1,709	36.59%	0	0.00%	−1,253	−26.83%	4,671
Greene	3,301	63.18%	1,905	36.46%	19	0.36%	−1,396	−26.72%	5,225
Greensville	879	31.12%	1,943	68.78%	3	0.11%	1,064	37.66%	2,825
Halifax	4,764	50.12%	4,722	49.67%	20	0.21%	−42	−0.44%	9,506
Hampton	10,497	28.83%	25,828	70.93%	90	0.25%	15,331	42.10%	36,415
Hanover	22,143	57.96%	15,820	41.41%	240	0.63%	−6,323	−16.55%	38,203
Harrisonburg	3,499	44.41%	4,349	55.20%	31	0.39%	850	10.79%	7,879
Henrico	36,761	36.19%	64,209	63.21%	603	0.59%	27,448	27.02%	101,573
Henry	7,321	56.08%	5,709	43.73%	25	0.19%	−1,612	−12.35%	13,055
Highland	506	57.83%	369	42.17%	0	0.00%	−137	−15.66%	875
Hopewell	2,163	41.64%	3,015	58.05%	16	0.31%	852	16.40%	5,194
Isle of Wight	6,303	52.29%	5,721	47.46%	31	0.26%	−582	−4.83%	12,055
James City	13,168	49.34%	13,450	50.39%	72	0.27%	282	1.06%	26,690
King and Queen	983	45.68%	1,166	54.18%	3	0.14%	183	8.50%	2,152
King George	3,897	59.22%	2,667	40.53%	16	0.24%	−1,230	−18.69%	6,580
King William	2,861	55.49%	2,274	44.10%	21	0.41%	−587	−11.38%	5,156
Lancaster	2,084	46.75%	2,358	52.89%	16	0.36%	274	6.15%	4,458
Lee	3,459	73.69%	1,229	26.18%	6	0.13%	−2,230	−47.51%	4,694
Lexington	428	28.71%	1,058	70.96%	5	0.34%	630	42.25%	1,491
Loudoun	40,062	45.27%	48,164	54.43%	265	0.30%	8,102	9.16%	88,491
Louisa	5,333	54.26%	4,473	45.51%	22	0.22%	−860	−8.75%	9,828
Lunenburg	1,536	47.23%	1,708	52.52%	8	0.25%	172	5.29%	3,252
Lynchburg	10,296	52.71%	9,187	47.04%	49	0.25%	−1,109	−5.68%	19,532
Madison	2,644	60.87%	1,692	38.95%	8	0.18%	−952	−21.92%	4,344
Manassas	3,819	47.04%	4,278	52.70%	21	0.26%	459	5.65%	8,118
Manassas Park	873	41.79%	1,212	58.02%	4	0.19%	339	16.23%	2,089
Martinsville	1,335	40.24%	1,970	59.37%	13	0.39%	635	19.14%	3,318
Mathews	1,755	50.65%	1,706	49.24%	4	0.12%	−49	−1.41%	3,465
Mecklenburg	4,045	55.49%	3,242	44.48%	2	0.03%	−803	−11.02%	7,289
Middlesex	1,891	49.52%	1,923	50.35%	5	0.13%	32	0.84%	3,819
Montgomery	10,084	44.01%	12,767	55.72%	61	0.27%	2,683	11.71%	22,912
Nelson	2,270	43.17%	2,971	56.50%	17	0.32%	701	13.33%	5,258
New Kent	4,223	58.50%	2,954	40.92%	42	0.58%	−1,269	−17.58%	7,219
Newport News	15,027	35.92%	26,732	63.90%	78	0.19%	11,705	27.98%	41,837
Norfolk	10,394	23.08%	34,515	76.63%	130	0.29%	24,121	53.56%	45,039
Northampton	1,171	29.59%	2,783	70.31%	4	0.10%	1,612	40.73%	3,958
Northumberland	2,518	48.96%	2,600	50.55%	25	0.49%	82	1.59%	5,143
Norton	489	57.67%	355	41.86%	4	0.47%	−134	−15.80%	848
Nottoway	1,731	44.08%	2,188	55.72%	8	0.20%	457	11.64%	3,927
Orange	5,590	56.70%	4,242	43.03%	27	0.27%	−1,348	−13.67%	9,859
Page	3,664	61.48%	2,284	38.32%	12	0.20%	−1,380	−23.15%	5,960
Patrick	3,343	67.86%	1,580	32.07%	3	0.06%	−1,763	−35.79%	4,926
Petersburg	879	10.73%	7,296	89.08%	15	0.18%	6,417	78.35%	8,190
Pittsylvania	10,973	61.22%	6,922	38.62%	30	0.17%	−4,051	−22.60%	17,925
Poquoson	2,899	66.20%	1,469	33.55%	11	0.25%	−1,430	−32.66%	4,379
Portsmouth	6,697	26.14%	18,850	73.58%	70	0.27%	12,153	47.44%	25,617
Powhatan	6,335	63.30%	3,620	36.17%	53	0.53%	−2,715	−27.13%	10,008
Prince Edward	2,084	40.70%	3,024	59.06%	12	0.23%	940	18.36%	5,120
Prince George	4,704	51.25%	4,443	48.41%	31	0.34%	−261	−2.84%	9,178
Prince William	41,913	43.57%	54,009	56.14%	278	0.29%	12,096	12.57%	96,200
Pulaski	4,509	56.61%	3,437	43.15%	19	0.24%	−1,072	−13.46%	7,965
Radford	1,240	42.98%	1,634	56.64%	11	0.38%	394	13.66%	2,885
Rappahannock	1,442	49.98%	1,433	49.67%	10	0.35%	−9	−0.31%	2,885
Richmond City	10,056	17.57%	46,897	81.93%	289	0.50%	36,841	64.36%	57,242
Richmond County	1,142	51.05%	1,092	48.82%	3	0.13%	−50	−2.24%	2,237
Roanoke City	7,770	36.58%	13,402	63.09%	71	0.33%	5,632	26.51%	21,243
Roanoke County	17,487	57.21%	12,978	42.46%	100	0.33%	−4,509	−14.75%	30,565
Rockbridge	3,267	49.70%	3,293	50.10%	13	0.20%	26	0.40%	6,573
Rockingham	15,501	71.21%	6,166	28.33%	100	0.46%	−9,335	−42.89%	21,767
Russell	3,897	66.08%	1,990	33.75%	10	0.17%	−1,907	−32.34%	5,897
Salem	3,842	54.66%	3,158	44.93%	29	0.41%	−684	−9.73%	7,029
Scott	4,012	77.51%	1,157	22.35%	7	0.14%	−2,855	−55.16%	5,176
Shenandoah	7,236	63.56%	4,124	36.23%	24	0.21%	−3,112	−27.34%	11,384
Smyth	4,908	66.97%	2,400	32.75%	21	0.29%	−2,508	−34.22%	7,329
Southampton	2,325	46.09%	2,716	53.84%	4	0.08%	391	7.75%	5,045
Spotsylvania	17,410	55.51%	13,868	44.22%	83	0.26%	−3,542	−11.29%	31,361
Stafford	18,106	53.65%	15,513	45.97%	127	0.38%	−2,593	−7.68%	33,746
Staunton	3,012	47.82%	3,268	51.88%	19	0.30%	256	4.06%	6,299
Suffolk	9,699	40.80%	14,037	59.05%	35	0.15%	4,338	18.25%	23,771
Surry	998	37.69%	1,644	62.08%	6	0.23%	646	24.40%	2,648
Sussex	1,094	34.45%	2,073	65.27%	9	0.28%	979	30.82%	3,176
Tazewell	7,179	73.62%	2,559	26.24%	14	0.14%	−4,620	−47.37%	9,752
Virginia Beach	47,715	45.25%	57,485	54.51%	257	0.24%	9,770	9.26%	105,457
Warren	5,712	59.94%	3,789	39.76%	29	0.30%	−1,923	−20.18%	9,530
Washington	10,028	70.87%	4,104	29.00%	18	0.13%	−5,924	−41.87%	14,150
Waynesboro	2,700	55.66%	2,139	44.09%	12	0.25%	−561	−11.56%	4,851
Westmoreland	2,001	46.22%	2,320	53.59%	8	0.18%	319	7.37%	4,329
Williamsburg	1,313	30.50%	2,970	68.99%	22	0.51%	1,657	38.49%	4,305
Winchester	2,668	47.48%	2,929	52.13%	22	0.39%	261	4.64%	5,619
Wise	5,699	71.07%	2,296	28.63%	24	0.30%	−3,403	−42.44%	8,019
Wythe	4,795	62.94%	2,794	36.68%	29	0.38%	−2,001	−26.27%	7,618
York	11,661	55.55%	9,262	44.12%	69	0.33%	−2,399	−11.43%	20,992
Totals	980,257	44.54%	1,213,155	55.12%	7,472	0.34%	232,898	10.58%	2,200,884

==== By congressional district ====
Northam won seven of 11 congressional districts, including four held by Republicans.

District	Jackson	Northam	Representative
1st	51%	49%	Rob Wittman
2nd	43%	57%	Scott Rigell
3rd	20%	80%	Bobby Scott
4th	47%	53%	Randy Forbes
5th	51%	49%	Robert Hurt
6th	58%	42%	Bob Goodlatte
7th	49%	51%	Eric Cantor
8th	27%	73%	Jim Moran
9th	61%	39%	Morgan Griffith
10th	48%	52%	Frank Wolf
11th	35%	65%	Gerry Connolly

== See also ==
- 2013 Virginia elections
- 2013 Virginia gubernatorial election
- 2013 Virginia Attorney General election
- 2013 United States gubernatorial elections
