= 2013 Republican Party of Virginia convention =

U.S. state political party event

The 2013 Republican Party of Virginia convention was the process by which the Republican Party of Virginia selected its nominees for the offices governor, lieutenant governor, and attorney general for the 2013 general election in November. The convention was held on May 17 and 18, 2013, in the state capital of Richmond at the Richmond Coliseum.

Ken Cuccinelli's de facto nomination for governor was confirmed by acclamation at the convention. There were seven candidates for lieutenant governor; after an epic ten-hour, four-ballot battle, E.W. Jackson emerged as the nominee in an upset over better-funded candidates. Mark Obenshain narrowly defeated Rob Bell for the attorney general nomination.

== Background ==
=== Cuccinelli vs. Bolling and switch to convention ===
In 2008, incumbent lieutenant governor Bill Bolling made a deal with then-Attorney General Bob McDonnell whereby McDonnell would run for governor and Bolling would run for re-election as lieutenant governor in 2009, and then Bolling would receive McDonnell's support for his own candidacy for governor in 2013. The deal was widely known and as such, Bolling was effectively running for governor since 2009, and in April 2010, Bolling filed the necessary paperwork to run in 2013. Virginia Attorney General Ken Cuccinelli, elected alongside McDonnell and Bolling in 2009, stated that he intended to run for re-election as attorney general in 2013, but did not rule out running for governor. In December 2011, Attorney General Ken Cuccinelli told his staff that he would run against Bolling for governor in 2013; the news went public, and in response, Bolling issued a statement accusing Cuccinelli of putting "his own personal ambition ahead of the best interests of the commonwealth and the Republican Party." This infuriated Bolling and set up a primary. Cuccinelli's announcement came two days before the annual statewide conference of Virginia Republicans, at which Bolling and his staff expressed being upset with Cuccinelli's decision.

In June 2012, the party's State Central Committee, which had new members since the committee previously voted to hold a primary, reversed course and voted 47–31 to select a nominee via convention in 2013, igniting much controversy among party members. The switch was a major blow to Bolling's candidacy, as Cuccinelli supporters were more ardent and involved in the party and thus more willing to travel to a day-long convention. Proponents of the reversal said a convention would prevent Democrats from meddling in the selection (Virginia does not register voters by party, making primaries open to voters regardless of party). Primaries are also run by the State Board of Elections and taxpayer funded; proponents said a convention, which is funded by the party, would save the state money. Convention proponents also argued that nominees selected by convention historically perform better in the general election than nominees selected by primary, and that conventions allow candidates to present their cases within the party, preventing candidates from tearing each other down via negative advertising seen by the general electorate. Opponents of the reversal said a convention would disenfranchise military voters who are unable to physically attend a convention, and would cost the party too much money. Bolling called the switch "unprecedented and unfair".

On November 28, 2012, Bolling withdrew from the race, in a "recognition of how difficult it would be [for him] to win the nomination", making Cuccinelli the de facto nominee.

=== Importance of office of lieutenant governor ===
The lieutenant governor of Virginia is a part-time role and has historically been a largely ceremonial post, with the primary responsibility being breaking the rare 20–20 tie in the 40-member Senate of Virginia. The office is also seen as a stepping stone to the office of governor. However, the practical importance of the office increased dramatically after the 2011 state Senate elections created an evenly divided Senate with 20 Republicans and 20 Democrats, making the lieutenant governor's tiebreaking power critical and determining which party holds control of the Senate.

==== Speculation and field ====
After the 2011 elections, there was much speculation as to who the nominee for the office would be, since Bolling was vacating the seat. Potential candidates who considered bids but did not run included Mark Obenshain, former GOP congressional nominee Keith Fimian, and state Sen. Jeff McWaters. Obenshain ended up running for attorney general; Fimian began raising money but decided not to run for the sake of his family; and speculation on McWaters waned and he never entered the race.

The field began taking shape in mid-2012. Prince William County Board of Supervisors Chairman Corey Stewart was the first to enter the race, announcing his bid in April 2012. State Sen. Steve Martin of Chesterfield announced he was running in June 2012 (on the same day that he filled in for Bolling in presiding over a pro forma session of the Senate). State Delegate Scott Lingamfelter also joined the race in June 2012. Stafford County Board of Supervisors Chairwoman Susan Stimpson announced her run in August 2012. Former delegate and state senator Jeannemarie Devolites Davis filed her paperwork to run in September 2012. Northern Virginia businessman and director of the state Republican 2012 election efforts Pete Snyder entered the race in November 2012. Attorney and pastor E.W. Jackson of Chesapeake rounded out the field, announcing he was running in December 2012 at the annual conference of state Republicans.

=== Attorney General race ===
Cuccinelli's run for governor meant the attorney general's office was open in 2013. Within two weeks, three candidates announced bids for the office in 2013. State Sen. Mark Obenshain of Harrisonburg announced he was exploring a run on December 2, 2011, shortly after Cuccinelli announced he was running for governor, and formally entered the race nearly a year later in November 2012. On December 6, 2011, Delegate Rob Bell of Charlottesville entered the race. Fairfax County Circuit Court Clerk John Frey entered the race the next day. Frey dropped out in November 2012, saying his opponents had spent more time campaigning across the state than he did.

== Candidates on the ballot ==
=== Governor ===
- Ken Cuccinelli, Attorney General of Virginia

Cuccinelli became the de facto nominee in January 2013, as Bolling had withdrawn and no other candidate filed for the Republican nomination by the deadline.

=== Lieutenant governor ===
- Jeannemarie Devolites Davis, former state senator and former state delegate
- E.W. Jackson, pastor, conservative activist and candidate for the U.S. Senate in 2012
- Scott Lingamfelter, state delegate
- Steve Martin, state senator
- Pete Snyder, businessman
- Corey Stewart, chairman of the Prince William County Board of Supervisors
- Susan Stimpson, chairwoman of the Stafford County Board of Supervisors

=== Attorney general ===
- Rob Bell, state delegate
- Mark Obenshain, state senator

== Convention proceedings ==
=== Approval of rules ===
The convention was called to order on the afternoon of May 17, 2013. Rules for the convention, which were previously released, were adopted, and the convention then recessed.

The rules required a full 50% + 1 vote majority to win the nomination in each race. Multiple ballots were anticipated for the lieutenant governor race, as none of the seven candidates were expected to reach a majority so quickly. Only one ballot was required for attorney general. In the lieutenant governor balloting, if no candidate reached a majority after the first ballot, the bottom two candidates with the fewest votes would be eliminated, and five candidates would be on the second ballot. On the second ballot, the bottom two would be eliminated, and three candidates would be on the third ballot. If no candidate reached a majority after the third ballot, the third candidate would be eliminated, and the two remaining candidates would be on the fourth and final ballot.

=== Nomination of Cuccinelli ===
The convention was called back to order on the morning of May 18, 2013. Cuccinelli was formally nominated by acclamation as thousands of delegates roared "aye" on the motion to nominate him for governor. In his acceptance speech, Cuccinelli stressed his record, contrasting his years of public service in Virginia with his Democratic opponent Terry McAuliffe's career. He rolled out a vision including specific calls for reforms of the tax code, education, and regulations.

=== Candidate speeches ===
According to the rules, candidates for lieutenant governor and attorney general were allotted seven minutes each to speak before the delegates. The most notable speech was that of E.W. Jackson, who electrified the crowd in an impassioned speech in which he rejected the label of "African-American", declaring, "I am not an African-American, I am an American! I am tired of the hyphenation. No more hyphenation!" He also vowed to "get the government off our backs, off our property, out of our families, out of our health care and out of our way."

=== Nomination of Mark Obenshain ===
Obenshain defeated Bell on the first ballot by a margin of 55%-45%. After the ballots were counted, Bell came to the podium and motioned to withdraw his candidacy and nominate Obenshain for attorney general. Obenshain was then nominated by acclamation. Obenshain's nomination came 35 years after his father, Richard D. Obenshain, received the Republican nomination for the United States Senate on the same stage at the Richmond Coliseum in May 1978. Richard Obenshain was killed in a plane crash a few months after his nomination. Mark Obenshain was joined by his mother, Richard's widow, on the stage to accept the nomination.

=== Nomination of E.W. Jackson ===
Chaos and conflicting statements went around the convention during the second, third, and fourth ballots in what appeared to be a stop-Jackson movement by the Snyder campaign. Snyder received the endorsements of tea party activist Jamie Radtke, and from Lingamfelter after his elimination, during balloting, which the campaign posted on flyers around the Coliseum. In the fourth round of balloting, flyers were distributed on the floor falsely claiming that Cuccinelli, Obenshain, and Stewart endorsed Snyder for the fourth ballot. All three of those campaigns denounced the flyers, and Stewart endorsed Jackson, even taking a lap around the floor with him to show his support.

Shortly after 10:00 pm EDT, after eight hours of voting and four ballots, Pete Snyder went to the stage and motioned to withdraw his candidacy and nominate E.W. Jackson for lieutenant governor by acclamation. After a loud "aye" from the delegates, Jackson took to the stage, and after a short victory speech, was joined by Cuccinelli and Obenshain, as the 2013 Republican ticket was presented.

=== Voting ===
Convention voting used a weighted vote system in which votes were allocated to local city or county unit committees based on their city's or county's population. Each vote cast could be worth more or less than one weighted vote depending on how many votes were cast from that unit.

==== First ballot ====
Obenshain won the attorney general race with 55% of both the weighted vote and the raw vote. Per the rules, Davis and Martin were eliminated after the first ballot as they placed sixth and seventh, respectively, out of seven candidates.

===== Lieutenant governor =====
Official results
Candidate	Weighted votes	Percentage
E.W. Jackson	3,732	31.3%
Susan Stimpson	1,798	15.1%
Corey Stewart	1,769	14.8%
Pete Snyder	1,739	14.6%
Scott Lingamfelter	1,375	11.5%
Jeannemarie Devolites Davis	861	7.2%
Steve Martin	662	5.5%
Total weighted votes cast: 11,936

===== Attorney general =====
Official results
Candidate	Weighted votes	Percentage
Mark Obenshain	6,584	55.2%
Rob Bell	5,354	44.8%
Total weighted votes cast: 11,936

==== Second ballot ====
Per the rules, Stimpson and Lingamfelter were eliminated after the second ballot, as they placed fourth and fifth, respectively, out of five candidates. Stimpson and Stewart actually received more raw, or popular, votes than Snyder, who placed second, but Snyder received a higher weighted vote count. (Stewart received the votes of 1,297 delegates, Stimpson received the votes of 1,232 delegates, and Snyder received the votes of 1,196 delegates. However, Snyder received more weighted votes.)

Official results
Candidate	Weighted votes	Percentage
E.W. Jackson	4,560	38.2%
Pete Snyder	2,029	17.0%
Corey Stewart	1,910	16.0%
Susan Stimpson	1,874	15.7%
Scott Lingamfelter	1,432	12.0%
Total weighted votes cast: 11,936

==== Third ballot ====
Per the rules, Stewart was eliminated after the third ballot, as he received the fewest votes.

Official results
Candidate	Weighted votes	Percentage
E.W. Jackson	5,934	49.7%
Pete Snyder	3,652	30.6%
Corey Stewart	2,350	19.7%
Total weighted votes cast: 11,936

==== Fourth ballot ====
Official results
Candidate	Weighted votes	Percentage
E.W. Jackson	6,936	58.1%
Pete Snyder	4,948	41.9%
Total weighted votes cast: 11,936

== See also ==
- 2013 Virginia gubernatorial election
- 2013 Virginia lieutenant gubernatorial election
- 2013 Virginia elections
