= Hank the Cat =

Maine Coon cat who ran for the United States Senate in 2012

Hank
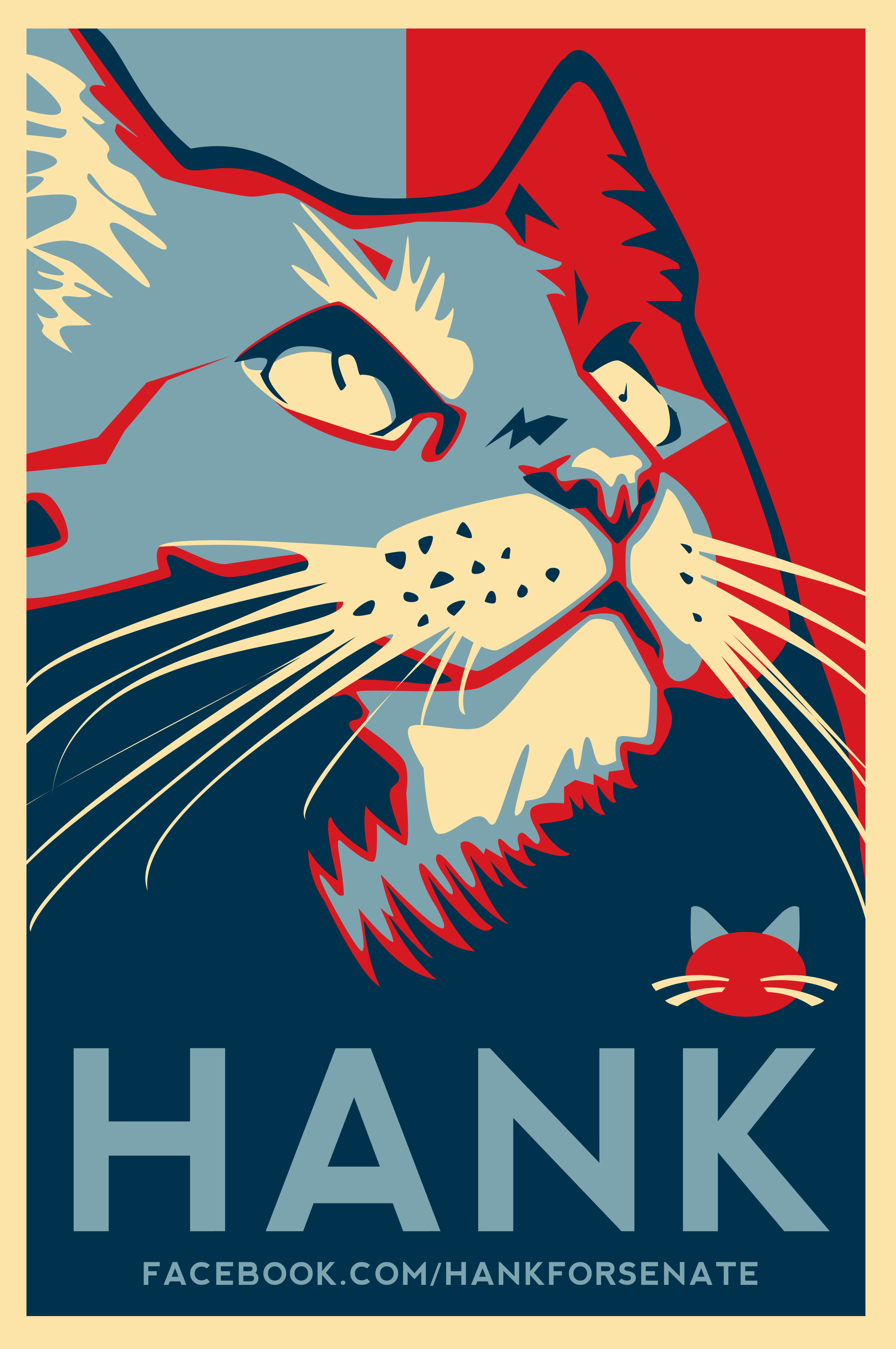
- Hank for Senate Political Poster
- Species: Felis catus
- Breed: Maine Coon
- Sex: Male
- Born: August 2001
- Died: February 13, 2014 (aged 12)
- Cause of death: Stomach lymphoma
- Known for: 2012 United States Senate election in Virginia joke candidacy
- Owners: Matthew O'Leary, Anthony Roberts

Hank the Cat (August 2001 – February 13, 2014) was a Maine Coon cat and politician who was put up as a joke candidate in the 2012 United States Senate election in Virginia, a feat which gained international coverage after Hank reportedly came third behind the two major candidates. He died in 2014 due to stomach lymphoma.

== Early life ==
According to a satirical biography of Hank lampooning the rags-to-riches biographies prevalent for mainstream Senate candidates, Hank and his siblings were found on a street and taken to an animal shelter, and were initially designated for animal euthanasia. However, they were instead given to Animal Allies, a rescue group, and Hank was adopted by a family in Springfield. The biography then says Hank worked his way through school to gain high grades, and then entered into business, starting up several successful companies.

== Run for Senate ==
In his joke biography, Hank was encouraged to run because of his life story, experiences and his work ethic, while his website described him as "a refreshing candidate—energetic, inspiring, and real". In reality, owners Matthew O'Leary and Anthony Roberts put him up when they both grew exasperated by regular political campaigns. Initially, Hank ran for state Senate, but gained only 9 write-in votes, though his owners mocked that by saying that regular politicians respond to such a defeat by running for the next highest office, which led to their decision to stand Hank for the United States Senate.

Though a joke candidacy, the campaign was built upon a couple of serious points—mocking conventional candidates, and to raise awareness and funds for animal groups, and rescue organizations donated $16,000 to the campaign. Hank's policies were described as "Animal Rescue, Spay & Neuter programs, and Positive Campaign Reform." Beyond the United States, O'Leary and Roberts gained the help of Svetlana Petrova, a St. Petersburg-based artist, who designed two-dollar bills featuring Hank. On election day, Hank supporters stood outside polling stations trying to gain last-minute supporters; an effort which, according to O'Leary and Roberts, led to a baffled albeit positive reaction from voters, although he said that they received a frosty reception from Republican volunteers. Hank himself slept through the day.

In the election there were 7,319 write-in votes and Hank's owners stated that these all were votes for Hank, making him third. This prompted media coverage not just in Virginia, but also nationally and internationally. By the end of the campaign, O'Leary and Roberts raised $60,000, which they intended to donate to animal charities, including one in Russia selected by Petrova in gratitude for her help. Roberts commended the effort, saying, "There are literally going to be lives that are saved with that. From our personal point of view we got to share our kitty with the entire world, and that's really great."

Hank's campaign was the subject of a parody attack ad launched on YouTube on March 3, 2012.

== See also ==
- List of individual cats
