= New Media Strategies =

Defunct media company

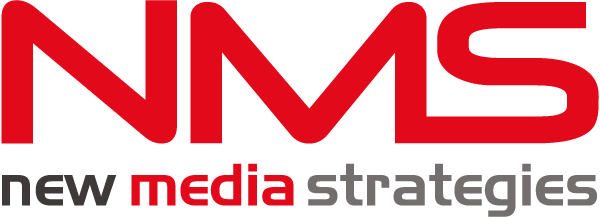
- Type: Subsidiary
- Industry: Social media, marketing, public relations
- Founded: Washington, DC (1999)
- Headquarters: Arlington, Virginia, United States
- Key people: Pete Snyder, Founder
- Parent: Meredith Corporation
- Website: nms.com

New Media Strategies (NMS) was a social media agency headquartered in Arlington, Virginia. The company was founded in 1999 by Pete Snyder, and as of 2011 had 120 employees. NMS was known as one of the first companies to strictly focus on social media as a form of marketing communications, and in 2011 was described as "the largest social media agency in the world" by The Washington Post. It was a subsidiary of Meredith Corporation, a Fortune 500 media company which acquired NMS in 2007.

== History ==
Pete Snyder founded New Media Strategies in 1999 with $150,000 from his own savings, credit cards, and the investments of friends and family. The company initially operated from Snyder's Capitol Hill apartment before opening office space in Washington, D.C., and later moving its headquarters to Arlington, Virginia. Drawing upon earlier experience in political polling and market research, Snyder recognized that companies at the time lacked an understanding of how to interpret and respond to what was being said about them online—prompting him to establish the first Internet firm to offer online conversation analysis and real-time communications consultation to clients. The business model was based on treating the Internet as "the world's largest focus group" and the company found its earliest business with film studios, soon counting The Walt Disney Company, ABC and Burger King among its initial clients.

In 2005, Washingtonian magazine listed it as one of the Baltimore-Washington metropolitan area's "50 Great Places to Work". Though it was created during the tech boom of the late 1990s, NMS expanded in the years following this time period, being recorded by Inc. Magazine' as one of the "500 fastest growing private companies" in the United States in 2004, 2005 and 2006.

In 2011, founder Pete Snyder stepped down from NMS to start up a new company, Disruptor Capital.

=== Acquisition ===
In January 2007, New Media Strategies was acquired by Meredith Corporation, a Fortune 500 firm traditionally known for its publishing and broadcasting holdings. Snyder remained as CEO until December 2011. At the time of the acquisition, a portion of the proceeds were set aside in an employee stock pool, which appreciated to $2.5 million and in 2010 was paid out to employees who had remained at the company for three years. The New York Post described this profit-sharing arrangement as atypical in the advertising industry, as acquisitions of this nature do not traditionally involve compensation of non-executive employees.

NMS was integrated into Meredith Xcelerated Marketing (MXM), a Meredith company specializing in content marketing.

== Areas of business ==
Structured as an agency, NMS primarily operated as a consultant which "helps firms develop marketing strategies for social media", according to The Wall Street Journal. The company specialized early on in measuring and participating in online discussion surrounding Hollywood films, and an entertainment division of the organization has since coordinated online public relations campaigns for NBC and other broadcast television networks. A public affairs division included political and news media clients such as the Fred Thompson presidential campaign and C-SPAN, and a corporate practice represents restaurant chains, retailers and companies within the consumer packaged goods industry.

NMS advised the National Football League Players Association during the 2011 NFL lockout, producing a video advertisement and an online petition entitled "Let Us Play", which addressed the threat of an expiring collective bargaining agreement between the league and its players. A broadcast television network refused to air the ad, prompting news media to draw attention to the video on YouTube. NFL players began to use the hashtag "#letusplay" when discussing the campaign on Twitter, and it became the subject of media coverage for its use of online media instead of traditional media as a means of advocacy. The company also engages in organizational training. It hosted a "social media day" at the New York Stock Exchange on November 3, 2011, which was held to teach members of corporations traded on the exchange how to be more effective in using social networks such as Facebook, Twitter and LinkedIn for public communication.

Up through 2007, New Media Strategies created and operated a series of websites dedicated to women anchors of Fox News on behalf of then-CEO Roger Ailes. The agency ran blogs devoted to anchors Laurie Dhue and Kiran Chetry that linked to a portal website called Girls of Fox News. That site included suggestive screenshots and degrading commentary on the appearances of Fox News anchors Megyn Kelly, Alisyn Camerota, and Courtney Friel.
