= E. W. Jackson =

American Protestant bishop and politician

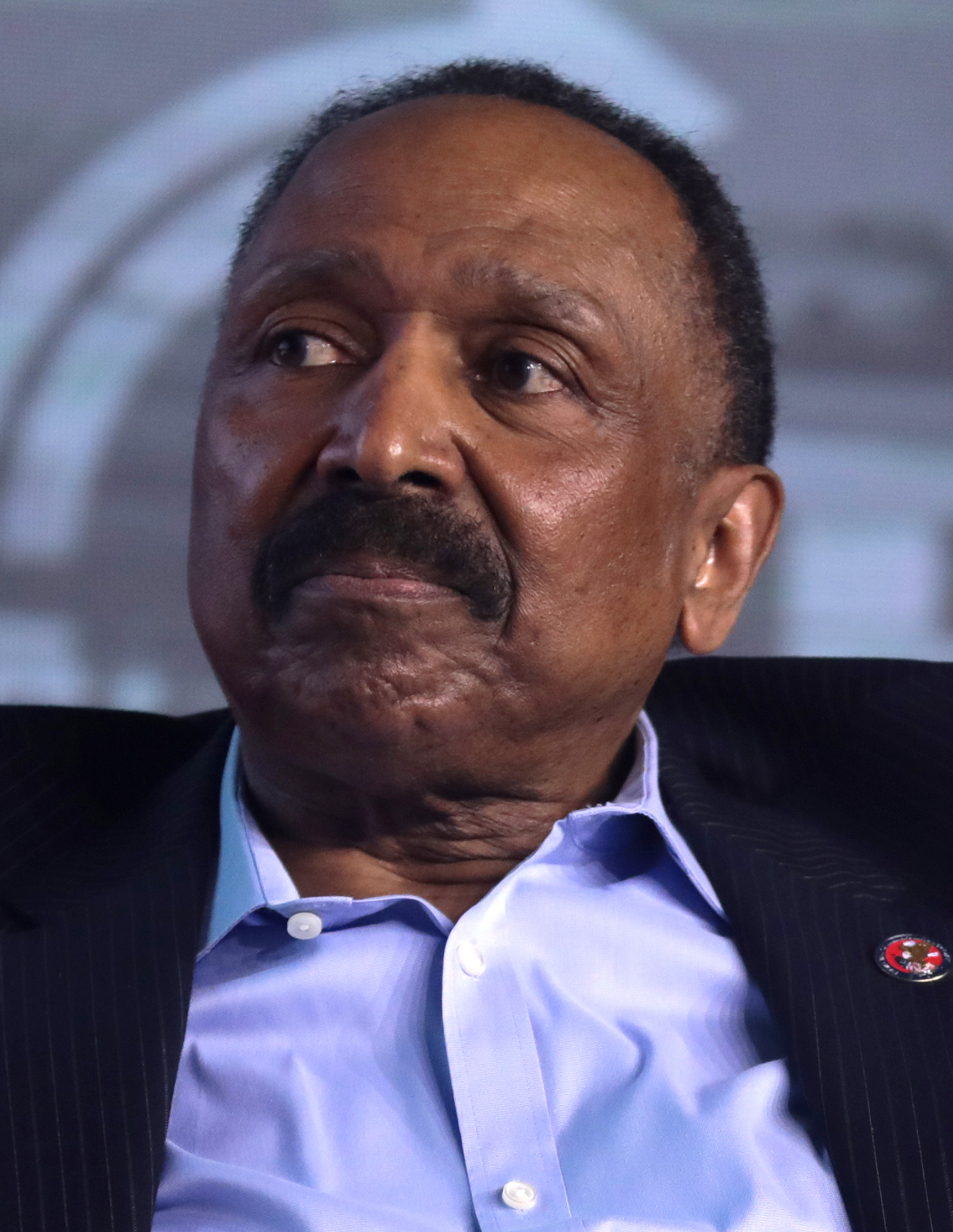
- Jackson in 2023
- Born: Earl Walker Jackson; January 13, 1952 (age 74); Chester, Pennsylvania, U.S.
- Education: University of Massachusetts Boston (BA); Harvard University (JD)
- Political party: Democratic (Before 1980s); Republican (1980s–present)
- Military career
- Allegiance: United States
- Branch: United States Marine Corps
- Service years: 1970–1973
- Rank: Corporal

Earl Walker Jackson Sr. (born January 13, 1952) is an American Protestant minister, lawyer, and perennial candidate. He was a candidate in the 2024 Republican Party presidential primaries. He was the Republican Party nominee for Lieutenant Governor of Virginia in 2013. Jackson unsuccessfully sought the Republican nomination for the United States Senate in Virginia in the 2012 and 2018 elections. He is head pastor at Exodus Faith Ministries, located in Chesapeake, Virginia and founder of Staying True to America's National Destiny, a Christian political organization.

== Early life ==
Jackson was born on January 13, 1952, in Chester, Pennsylvania, and he is the great-grandson of slaves from Orange County, Virginia. His parents separated when he was a child, and he spent most of his childhood in a foster home.

== Military service, education, and career ==
Jackson joined the United States Marine Corps in 1970. He was honorably discharged as a corporal in 1973. He is a graduate of the University of Massachusetts Boston and Harvard Law School.

He practiced law in the Boston area for 15 years. Jackson said he was asked to leave his first ministerial position in 1982, at a Baptist church in Cambridge, after two years. He said of his tenure there, "It was an older congregation, and I was a young 27-year-old firebrand. It was not a good mix." He remained in Boston until the late 1990s as a practicing attorney and preacher.

While in Boston, he appeared on several radio shows on WHDH and hosted a nationally syndicated talk show, Earl Jackson Across America.

While in Boston, Jackson became involved in extended legal battles with the Federal Communications Commission while serving as the general manager of a radio station.

=== Ministry ===
In 1998, Jackson and his family moved to Chesapeake, Virginia, and began holding weekly Bible studies. In 1999, Jackson and his wife founded Exodus Faith Ministries, a nondenominational church. The church rented a space in a storefront location, but was forced to move due to zoning regulations, an incident that helped to shape his concerns of "government overreach". The church rents a room at a Chesapeake hotel, where Jackson preaches every Sunday. Jackson founded Chesapeake's annual Martin Luther King Jr. Breakfast.

==== Black community ====
In 2012, Jackson generated national attention with a recorded video appeal to blacks to leave the Democratic Party, claiming that it had "abandoned the values of the black community" and that blacks had developed a "slavish devotion" to the party. He has also spoken in black churches on issues facing the country.

Jackson has claimed many black leaders, such as Jesse Jackson and Al Sharpton, as well as Barack Obama, "are telling black kids what they can't do." He opposed Obama's perceived "emphasis on race" and has said "the one thing I at least hoped for from the president—and I didn't have much hope for him—was that he'd bring us together. But he has divided us."

In response to rebukes from some black leaders over his comments, Jackson said, "In order to correct something, you've got to speak to it. ... [T]he last thing in the world I'm trying to do, as some have suggested, is to make white people feel good. I'm trying to make black folks, particularly youth, wake up to the possibilities of a life of prosperity."

Jackson rejects the label of "African-American", calling himself "an American of African descent". He said he is proud of his heritage but says "I just think we've got to come together as Americans, as one family. So I do point that out because that's the reality of it."

=== Party affiliation ===
Jackson had been a lifelong Democrat; however, in the 1980s, he embraced conservatism. He said of his decision, "I had a crisis of conscience. Can I be in a party that holds these views that are antithetical to my worldview? In my personal opinion, it is difficult if you are a Bible-believing Christian to reconcile that to some of the positions that the Democrat Party has taken."

Jackson has claimed that Democratic Party elites are "driving an agenda to rid the party and the country of God," and has claimed that his policies are closer to those of the "average Democrat in Virginia" than the Democratic Party itself.

== 2012 candidacy for U.S. Senate ==
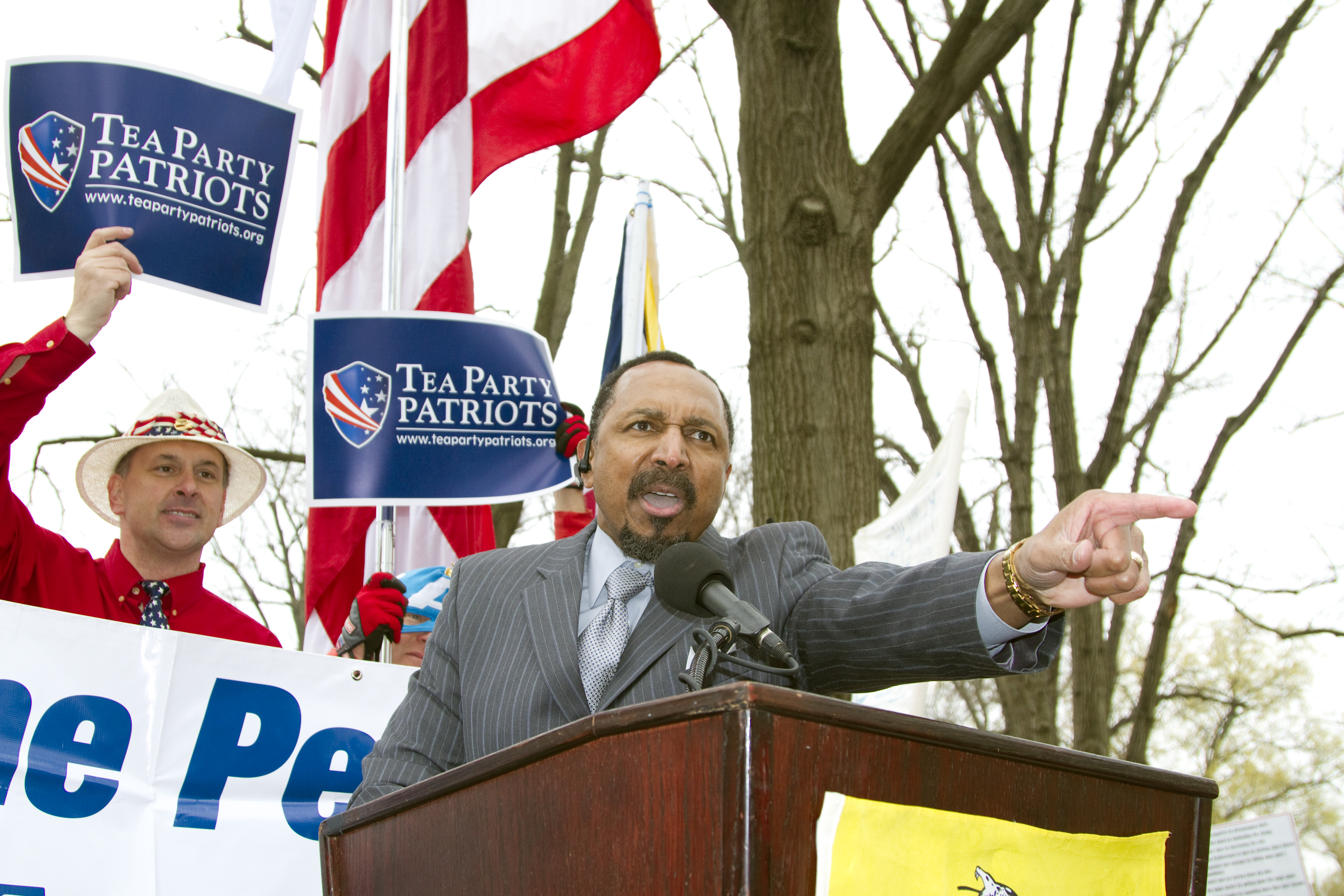
Jackson speaking in 2011

In May 2011, Jackson announced he was running for the United States Senate seat in Virginia in the 2012 election. George Allen won the June 2012 primary; Jackson received less than 5% of the vote.

Republican primary results
Party	Candidate	Votes	%
Republican	George Allen	167,607	65.5
Republican	Jamie Radtke	59,005	23.0
Republican	Bob Marshall	17,302	6.8
Republican	E. W. Jackson	12,083	4.7
Total votes		255,997	100

== 2013 Lieutenant Governor candidacy ==
=== Campaign for Republican nomination ===
Jackson announced his candidacy for Lieutenant Governor of Virginia on December 1, 2012, at the Republican Party of Virginia Advance in Virginia Beach, Virginia. On January 10, 2013, Jackson released his "Engage and Reform Agenda" which the campaign called "commonsense reforms [that] reassert the principles of our Constitution and Let Liberty Light the Way for Virginia."

On May 18, 2013, Jackson was nominated as the Republican Party candidate for the position, at the party convention in Richmond. The nomination process took four ballots and ten hours of voting. Jackson led in each round of balloting, reaching a majority on the final ballot. Jackson had raised the least money of the seven candidates for the Republican nomination. The Richmond Times-Dispatch called his victory a "stunning upset" over the other candidates.

2013 Virginia Republican convention Lieutenant governor nomination official results
Candidate	Weighted votes	Percentage
E.W. Jackson	3,732	31.3%
Susan Stimpson	1,798	15.1%
Corey Stewart	1,769	14.8%
Pete Snyder	1,739	14.6%
Scott Lingamfelter	1,375	11.5%
Jeannemarie Devolites Davis	861	7.2%
Steve Martin	662	5.5%
Total weighted votes cast: 11,936

=== Controversy over past statements ===
After his nomination, Jackson received criticism for some of his past statements that have been perceived as derogatory to the LGBTQ community, non-Christians, and Democrats. He has been criticized for alleged Islamophobia in response to his comments about House Floor rule changes to accommodate members who wear headcoverings.

In June 2013, in Manassas, Jackson held a press conference to address his past and to counter what he claimed were distortions of his past words and statements by his opponents. Jackson disputed a number of criticisms of his theology, which he had were "twisted and distorted," and said, "I'm not going to spend the campaign talking about these issues, so let's get it out of the way now." Jackson also revealed previously unreported details about his financial history and past drug use, saying he wanted to "reveal as many of my weaknesses and shortcomings as a curious press and my opposition might want to look into," and by doing so, "maybe save you and your colleagues some further research." In regard to criticism of his past statements that birth defects are "caused by parents' sins," Jackson said, "I do not believe that birth defects are caused by parents' sin unless, of course, there's a direct scientific connection between the parents' behavior and the disabilities of the child," such as a child who might develop birth defects if their mother was addicted to heroin. He claimed that he had not said that yoga leads to Satanism.

Jackson claimed that his comments about gay people have been taken out of context, and that they were directed not towards the general LGBT community but rather its "more politically active, fringe members." Of past comments that homosexuality "poisons culture", he then claimed that "What I really said was that the gay rights movement, so called, the homosexual activists, engage in some behavior that is absolutely horrendous, and that's true, everybody knows that; from going into Catholic churches and desecrating the Sacraments to engaging in all kinds of demonstrative behavior to try to call attention to what they view as their plight." He also called some gay people "rabid [and] radical."

In 2018, on December 5, on his radio show, Jackson said, "The floor of Congress is now going to look like an Islamic republic." He said, "We are a Judeo-Christian country. We are a nation rooted and grounded in Christianity and that's that. And anybody that doesn't like that, go live somewhere else. It's very simple. Just go live somewhere else." His comments drew widespread criticism.

In April 2019, Jackson said that the United States would turn into a "homocracy" if it elects Pete Buttigieg, an openly gay candidate, for president.

=== General election campaign ===
Through the second quarter of 2013 ending on June 30, 2013, Jackson raised $375,324. Most of his contributions were from small donors, indicating a large grassroots base. From July 1 through August 31, 2013, Jackson raised $303,220. Jackson spent $1.3 million throughout the campaign cycle.

Jackson's education plan included calls for school vouchers and a constitutional amendment allowing public money to help fund private schools. Republican nominee for governor Ken Cuccinelli's plan included the same proposals, and Jackson said he strongly supported Cuccinelli's plan. Jackson, whose wife is a public school teacher in Newport News, has called for a constitutional amendment for equal resources for homeschooled students.

Jackson has backed the Farm Freedom Act, a bill proposed by Delegate Brenda Pogge which would allow family farmers to sell their goods without having to go through state and federal regulations, which restrict direct sale of goods to consumers. He pointed to the sharp decline in farms grossing under $100,000 a year, saying it was a result of onerous bureaucracy and regulations.

Jackson's campaign launched a Women for Jackson coalition composed of women across the state supporting Jackson's aim to "fight for greater parental choice in our children's educational opportunities, stand strong for health standards that keep women's clinics safe, and help create an economic environment in Virginia that helps people from all walks of life."

Jackson was endorsed by the Virginia Fraternal Order of Police, the Virginia Police Benevolent Association, Gun Owners of America, and retired NASCAR racer Morgan Shepherd.

Northam defeated Jackson in the November 5, 2013 general election.

Virginia lieutenant gubernatorial election, 2013
Party	Candidate	Votes	%	±%
Democratic	Ralph Northam	1,213,155	55.12%	+11.72
Republican	E. W. Jackson	980,257	44.54%	−11.97
Write-ins		7,472	0.34%	+0.26
Majority		232,898	10.58%	
Total votes		2,200,884	100.0%	

== 2018 candidacy for U.S. Senate ==
Jackson ran for senate again in 2018, but he only garnered 12% of the vote in the Republican Party's open primary and failed to advance in the general election.

Republican primary results
Party	Candidate	Votes	%
Republican	Corey Stewart	136,610	44.87%
Republican	Nick Freitas	131,321	43.14%
Republican	E.W. Jackson	36,508	11.99%
Total votes		304,439	100.00%

== 2024 presidential candidacy ==
On July 14, 2023, Jackson announced his bid for President of the United States as a Republican in the 2024 election. He campaigned on a right-wing, Christian conservative platform, proposing four new amendments to the United States Constitution if he were to have been elected. The first amendment would have restricted abortion by personhood as beginning at conception, the second would have "define[d] gender as having only two categories, male and female," the third would have restricted same-sex marriage, and the fourth would have limited U.S. citizenship at birth to those who have one American parent. Jackson did not make it onto the ballot in any state.
