= Corey Stewart =

American politician in Virginia (born 1968)

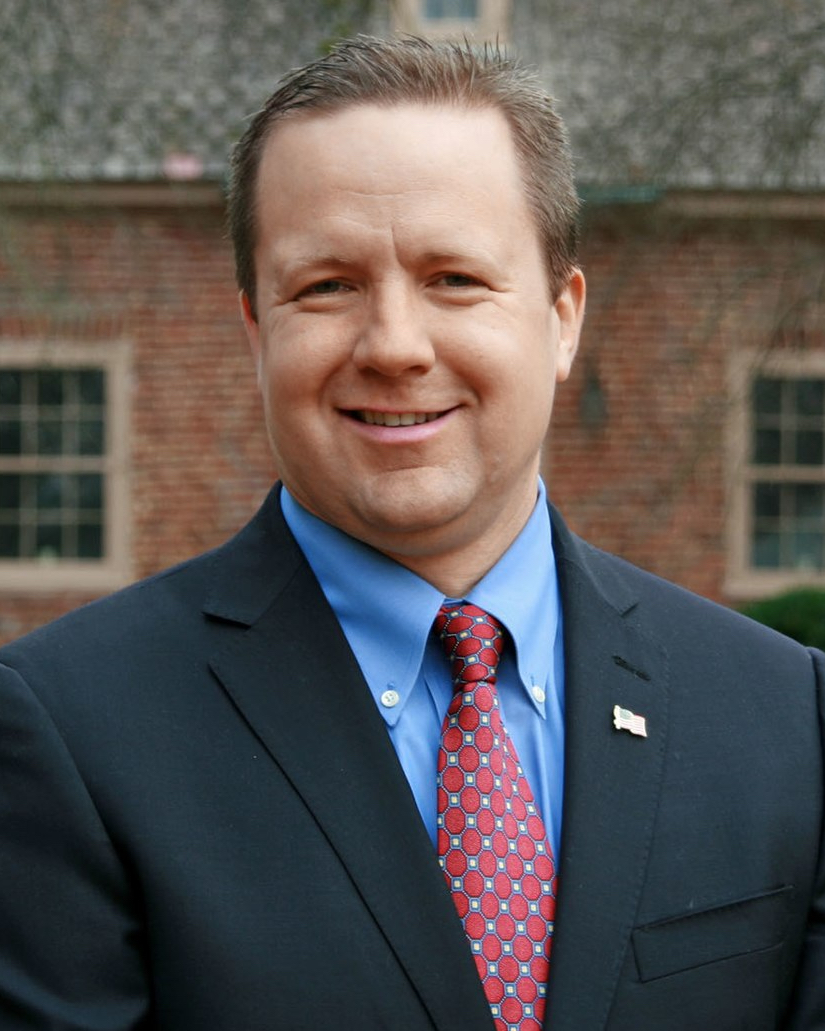
- Stewart in 2016

Chair of the Prince William Board of County Supervisors
- In office December 4, 2006 – December 31, 2019
- Preceded by: Sean Connaughton
- Succeeded by: Ann Wheeler

Occoquan District Supervisor
- In office November 6, 2003 – December 4, 2006
- Preceded by: Ruth Griggs
- Succeeded by: Michael May

Personal details
- Born: Corey Alan Stewart; August 1, 1968 (age 58) Duluth, Minnesota, U.S.
- Party: Republican
- Spouse: Maria Stewart
- Children: 2
- Education: St. Olaf College; Georgetown University (BS); William Mitchell College of Law (JD)
- Website: Official website

Corey Alan Stewart (born August 1, 1968) is an American politician and international trade attorney who served as at-large chairman of the Board of Supervisors of Prince William County, Virginia from 2006 to 2019. A member of the Republican Party, he previously served as the Occoquan district supervisor from 2003 to 2006.

Stewart was the Republican nominee for the U.S. Senate in 2018 in the Commonwealth of Virginia, losing to Democratic incumbent Tim Kaine by more than a 15-point margin. In his campaign, he had portrayed himself as an ardent supporter of President Donald Trump.

According to The New York Times, Stewart "made his name attacking illegal immigrants and embracing emblems of the Confederacy". He drew national media attention for spearheading Prince William County's 2007 crackdown on illegal immigrants.

Stewart was the Virginia state chair of Donald Trump's 2016 presidential campaign, and co-chaired the Republican Party of Virginia's "Team Virginia" field and communications campaign in 2016. In October 2016, the Trump campaign fired him after he participated in an unsanctioned protest against the Republican National Committee.

In 2017, Stewart sought the Republican nomination for Governor of Virginia, narrowly losing to Ed Gillespie. He drew media attention for his admission that his campaign staff had edited his Wikipedia page to add positive spin, his use of the term "cuckservative" in a Reddit "Ask Me Anything", and his staunch support for Confederate symbols and monuments. In January 2019, he announced that he would be retiring from politics.

== Chair of the Board of Supervisors ==
=== Elections ===
Stewart was first elected chair of the Prince William County Board of Supervisors in a November 2006 special election to replace Sean Connaughton (who resigned to take a post at the United States Maritime Administration). Stewart defeated Democratic Party candidate Sharon Pandak with 53% of the vote. Stewart was elected to a full term in 2007 with 55% of the vote, reelected in 2011, and reelected to a third term in 2015 with 57% of the vote. He did not seek re-election in 2019. He was succeeded by Democrat Ann Wheeler.

=== Immigration ===
After Stewart took his seat as chair in 2007, the Prince William County Board of Supervisors unanimously passed a resolution designed to purge the county of undocumented immigrants; the new law allowed the Prince William County Police Department to check the immigration status of anyone, even if they were not suspected of wrongdoing. Additionally, the board directed county staff to cut off public services to illegal immigrants, including drug counseling, elderly services, services to the homeless, and business licenses. A year later, the law was amended to require local law enforcement officers to arrest people before they could enforce federal immigration law. Stewart said in 2012 that his crackdown on illegal immigration had "cut violent crime in half", a claim PolitiFact rated "mostly false".

The county's targeting of illegal immigrants was the subject of a documentary film, 9500 Liberty (2009).

=== Guns ===
Stewart led the successful effort to reduce Prince William County's concealed-carry handgun permit fee, reducing the overall cost to lawful handgun owners from $50 to the state minimum of $15.

Stewart raffled off an AR-15 semi-automatic rifle in January 2017, praising the weapon as "a good rifle". In March 2018 he posted on Twitter that the gun was less deadly than former secretary of state Hillary Clinton.

== Lieutenant Governor of Virginia campaign, 2013 ==
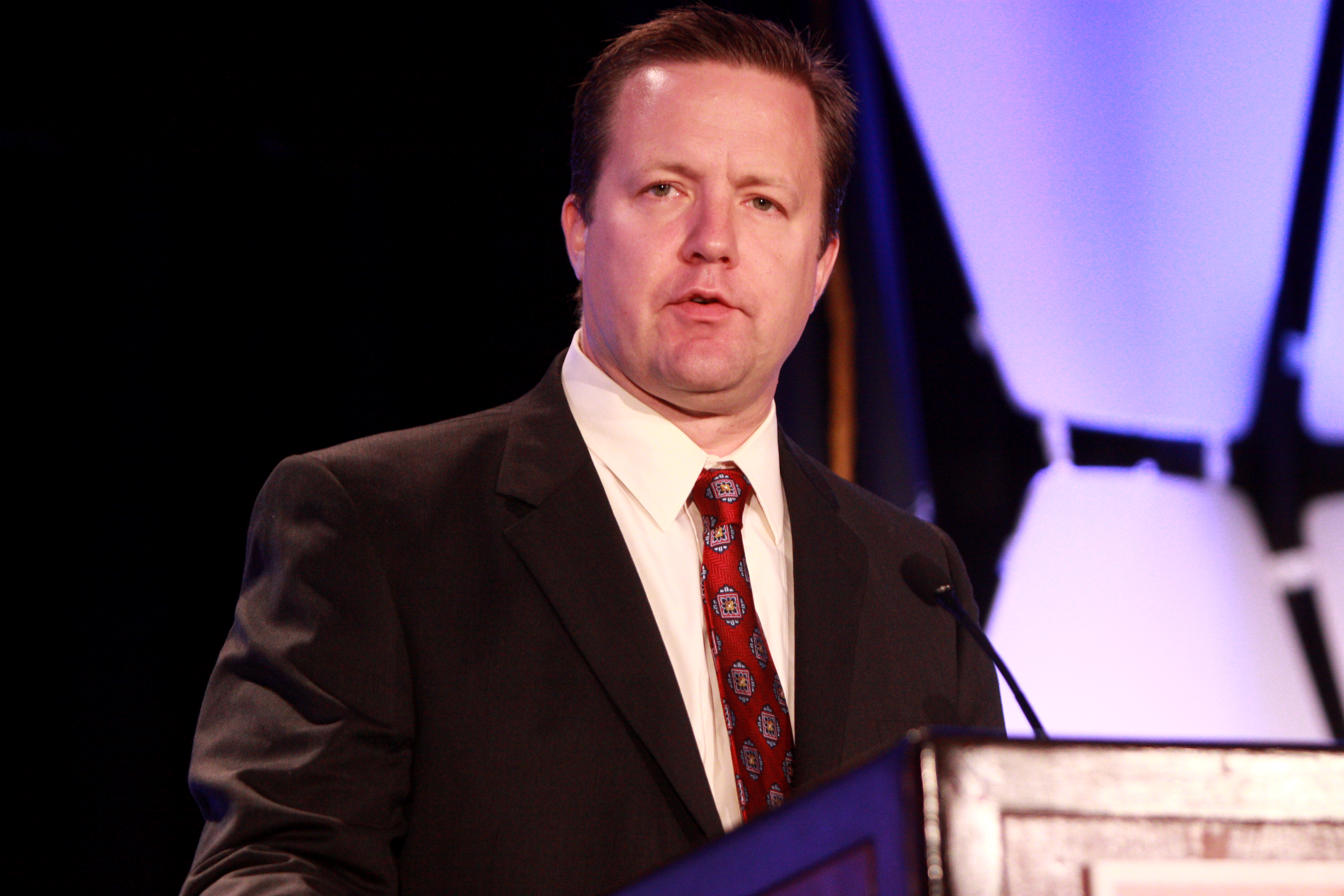
Stewart speaking at the Liberty Political Action Conference

Stewart unsuccessfully sought the Republican nomination for lieutenant governor in the 2013 election. In a seven-person race, he was eliminated in the third round of voting in the Republican convention, losing to E. W. Jackson.

== Trump presidential campaign, 2016 ==
In December 2015, Republican U.S. presidential candidate Donald Trump announced that he had chosen Stewart to chair his campaign in Virginia. Stewart has been an outspoken proponent of Trump in national media, and continued to support him even as other Republican officials disavowed him after various controversies, including the Access Hollywood scandal. In June 2016, the Republican Party of Virginia selected Stewart to co-chair its "Team Virginia" field and communications campaign, alongside former Virginia governor Jim Gilmore.

Stewart drew controversy in July 2016 when he blamed "liberal Democrats" including Democratic presidential candidate Hillary Clinton and Virginia lieutenant governor Ralph Northam for the spree killing of police officers in Dallas, Texas. Stewart criticized Democrats for "essentially encouraging the murder."

On October 10, 2016, amid reports that the Republican National Committee was withdrawing resources from the Trump campaign to focus on down-ballot races, Stewart joined a pro-Trump women's demonstration in front of the committee's Washington, D.C., headquarters. Following the protest, Trump campaign CEO Steve Bannon dismissed Stewart to "placate" RNC chairman Reince Priebus, who was reportedly "infuriated" by Stewart's actions. Days later, the RNC and the Trump campaign announced that they were withdrawing from Virginia, again drawing the ire of Stewart, who criticized the decision as a betrayal of the grassroots and "totally premature". Despite his firing, he continued to support Trump.

== Governor of Virginia campaign, 2017 ==
At the Virginia State Republican Convention on April 30, 2016, Stewart announced his intent to run for governor of Virginia. In the Republican primary, Stewart was described as "on the very conservative end." During the campaign, Stewart drew media attention for his admission that his campaign staff had edited his Wikipedia page to add positive spin, his use of the term "cuckservative" in a Reddit "Ask Me Anything" (AMA), and his staunch support for Confederate symbols and monuments.

During the campaign, Stewart announced that his campaign would give away an AR-15 semi-automatic rifle for Christmas to highlight his support for gun rights. In a Reddit AMA, Stewart called his GOP primary opponent Ed Gillespie a "cuckservative", agreed with a participant who asked if Bill Clinton was a rapist, and wrote "CONFIRMED!" to one who asked whether Virginia governor Terry McAuliffe "is a cuck". Virginia GOP chairman John Whitbeck rebuked the remarks, calling some of Stewart's language "racist", and noted that the term "cuckservative" is "used by white nationalists". Stewart also said that he and his campaign had been editing his Wikipedia page since at least May 2014 to remove unflattering information and add positive spin, through at least two registered accounts.

In May 2017, while speaking at Temple Rodef Shalom in Fairfax County, Stewart blamed progressives in the United States for an uptick in antisemitic incidents throughout the United States, saying, "Today most of the anti-Semitic bigotry is not coming from the right. It's coming from the left. We have to face it."

In April 2017, Stewart compared the removal of Confederate statues to the atrocities committed by ISIS. He posted on Twitter, "It appears ISIS has won. They are tearing down historical monuments in New Orleans now too. It must end. Despicable!" In his defense of Confederate monuments, he compared "those who wanted to remove the statue to tyrants and Nazis". Without Confederate symbols, he said at another event, "we lose our identity".

During the campaign, Stewart distinguished himself among Virginia politicians by not condemning the white supremacists who marched in the Unite the Right rally in Charlottesville in 2017. Stewart said that the counterprotesters at the rally were to blame for "half the violence" and he condemned fellow Republicans who expressed disapproval of the white supremacist march. However, Stewart later said, "I have always condemned the KKK and similar groups."

During the campaign, Stewart was endorsed by Richard Hines of Save Southern Heritage, a neo-Confederate group. Stewart accepted the endorsement.

Stewart consistently defended the Confederate flag and Virginia's "heritage" while voicing opposition to any removal of statues honoring Confederate figures. At the Old South Ball in Danville, Virginia, he stated, "It's the state of Robert E. Lee and Stonewall Jackson. That is our heritage. It is what makes us Virginia." He also said that the Confederate flag was totally unrelated to racism or slavery, saying, "I'm proud to be next to the Confederate flag. That flag is not about racism, folks, it's not about hatred, it's not about slavery. It's about our heritage. It's time that we stop running away from our heritage."

On June 13, Stewart narrowly lost the primary to Gillespie, garnering 155,466 votes (42.5%) to Gillespie's 160,003 (43.7%).

Following the primary, Stewart remained critical of Gillespie, calling him "boring" and claiming that "nobody cares" about Gillespie's immigrant ancestry. Stewart later endorsed Gillespie and campaigned for the Republican Party's nominee for lieutenant governor, Jill Vogel.

== United States Senate election, 2018 ==
On July 15, 2017, Stewart announced his intention to seek the Republican nomination for the U.S. Senate seat held by Democrat Tim Kaine. He promised a "very vicious, ruthless race", claiming that Republicans "are looking for a more aggressive populist candidate".

In December 2017, it was reported that the Republican Party of Virginia leadership was "maneuvering with help from the national GOP" to block Stewart's nomination. On December 5, Stewart received the endorsement of Jerry Falwell Jr., president of Liberty University. Conservative talk show host Laura Ingraham and former White House chief strategist Steve Bannon expressed support for Stewart, with Bannon having previously called Stewart the "titular head of the Trump movement" in Virginia. After Stewart won the Republican nomination in June 2018, it was widely reported that Republican lawmakers feared that Stewart's rhetoric would adversely impact other Republicans in the state. Former Republican lieutenant governor Bill Bolling said, "I am extremely disappointed that a candidate like Corey Stewart could win the Republican nomination for U.S. Senate. This is clearly not the Republican Party I once knew, loved and proudly served. Every time I think things can't get worse they do, and there is no end in sight." Shortly after Stewart's primary victory, several senior leaders of the Virginia Republican Party resigned, but did not say Stewart's primary victory had anything to do with it.

In a tweet on December 8, 2017, Stewart revived the "birther" conspiracy theory by suggesting that former president Barack Obama's birth certificate and Roy Moore accuser Beverly Nelson's yearbook were forgeries. The tweet drew criticism.

Following a vote in the Virginia House of Delegates to expand Medicaid in February 2018, Stewart led an event outside the Virginia State Capitol where he held up rolls of toilet paper and called Republicans who voted for the measure "flaccid" and "garbage". When asked to clarify his comments by the Richmond Times-Dispatch, Stewart replied, "I'm suggesting I feel sorry for their wives." The move brought strong condemnation from both Democrats and Republicans in the House of Delegates. Among those who condemned Stewart's remarks was Republican delegate Glenn Davis, who referred to Stewart in a speech on the House floor as a "charlatan whose record doesn't match his rhetoric". Davis' speech drew bipartisan applause from the chamber.

Stewart stirred controversy in June 2018 when it was reported that he had praised and paid far-right commentator Paul Nehlen. In January 2017, Stewart called Nehlen one of his "personal heroes" and said he was "inspired" by Nehlen's attempt to oust House speaker Paul Ryan in a Republican primary. Nehlen had previously made anti-Muslim comments, promoted fringe conspiracy theories and promoted content by white nationalists. In June 2018, five months after Nehlen made controversial anti-Semitic statements, Stewart disavowed Nehlen and said that he no longer considered Nehlen one of his heroes.

During the campaign, Stewart sought and received the support of the Public Advocate of the United States, an anti-LGBT group that advocates conversion therapy and compares homosexuality to pedophilia. The founder of the group has claimed that Obama is a "child molester" and promoted the Pizzagate conspiracy theory. Stewart pledged to the group that he would oppose "'Transgender Bathrooms' legislation and regulations - which have the effect of encouraging and protecting pedophiles". Stewart also agreed that public schools should be "prevented from brainwashing elementary school children with the Homosexual Agenda". Stewart indicated support for overturning Obergefell v. Hodges (the Supreme Court decision that ruled bans on same-sex marriage unconstitutional), requiring that schools teach that there are only two genders and granting Christian businesses the right to not service same-sex weddings. During the campaign, Stewart argued that the American Civil War was not about slavery. One of Stewart's top aides has promoted the Pizzagate conspiracy theory (the debunked far-right theory that senior Democrats operated a child prostitution ring) and the far-right conspiracy that Democrats had DNC staffer Seth Rich murdered.

On June 12, 2018, Stewart won the Republican primary. He eventually lost the general election to Democratic incumbent Tim Kaine in a match-up of two Minnesota-born Virginians.

Upon winning the primary, Stewart said he had a "mandate" to "kick Tim Kaine's teeth in." In a September debate, Stewart called Kaine a "bitter" partisan, and called the sexual assault allegations against Supreme Court nominee Brett Kavanaugh "unfounded" and "sensational". During a news conference in Falls Church, Stewart attempted to court Asian American voters by vowing to introduce legislation prohibiting institutions of higher learning from considering a student's race.

In early October 2018, Stewart held a rally in Fairfax, Virginia, in support of U.S. Immigration and Customs Enforcement. He expressed his support for the organization's officers and said he would work to "ensure not one penny of taxpayer money goes to welfare for those who entered our country illegally".

On November 6, 2018, Kaine defeated Stewart, who received 41% of the vote to Kaine's 57%.

== Political action committee ==
In March 2019, Stewart was named to head Keeping America Great, described as a pro-Trump conservative super PAC. In May 2019, Stewart shifted the focus of Keeping America Great to helping down-ballot Republicans after criticism from Trump campaign officials who preferred that donors direct their support in the presidential election to another super PAC.

== Trump administration ==
In November 2020, Stewart was appointed as the principal deputy assistant secretary for export administration at the U.S. Department of Commerce. According to Reuters, his appointment was intended to help the Trump administration advance "hardline policies on China" in its final months.

== Personal life ==
Stewart was born in Duluth, Minnesota, the son of Beverly, a homemaker, and Earl C. Stewart, a longshoreman. He transferred to Georgetown University after a year at St. Olaf College in Northfield, Minnesota, and was the first member of his family to graduate from college. He also graduated from the William Mitchell College of Law in St. Paul, Minnesota, and afterward settled in Virginia. Stewart works as an international trade attorney, and he and his family live in Bel Air (Woodbridge, Virginia). He met his wife, Maria, who is from Sweden, while spending a year teaching English in Japan before law school. The couple have two sons.

Party political offices
Preceded by George Allen	Republican nominee for U.S. Senator from Virginia (Class 1); 2018	Succeeded by Hung Cao
