= 2012 United States Senate election in Virginia =

- November 6, 2012
- Turnout: 66.4% (voting eligible)
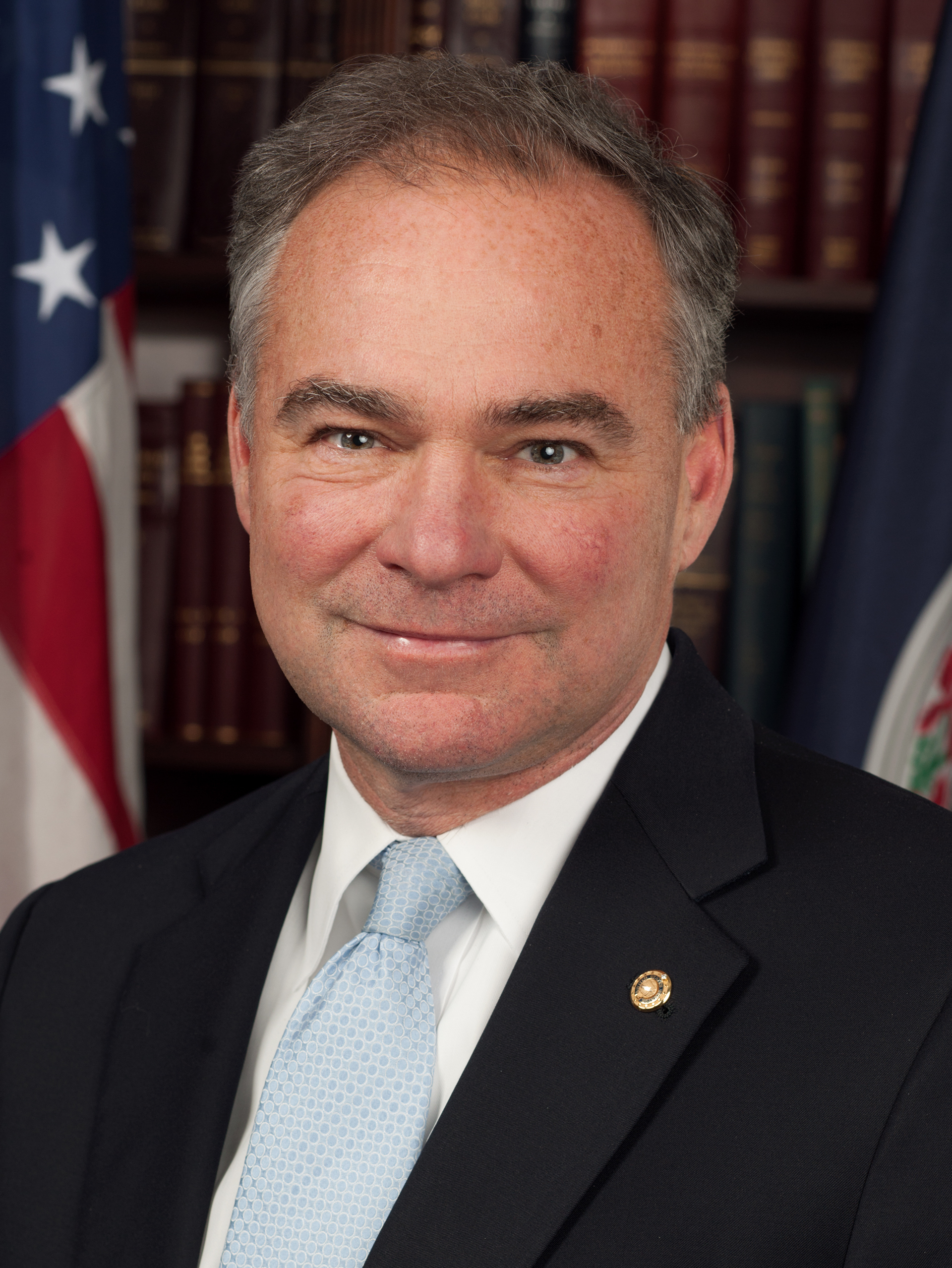

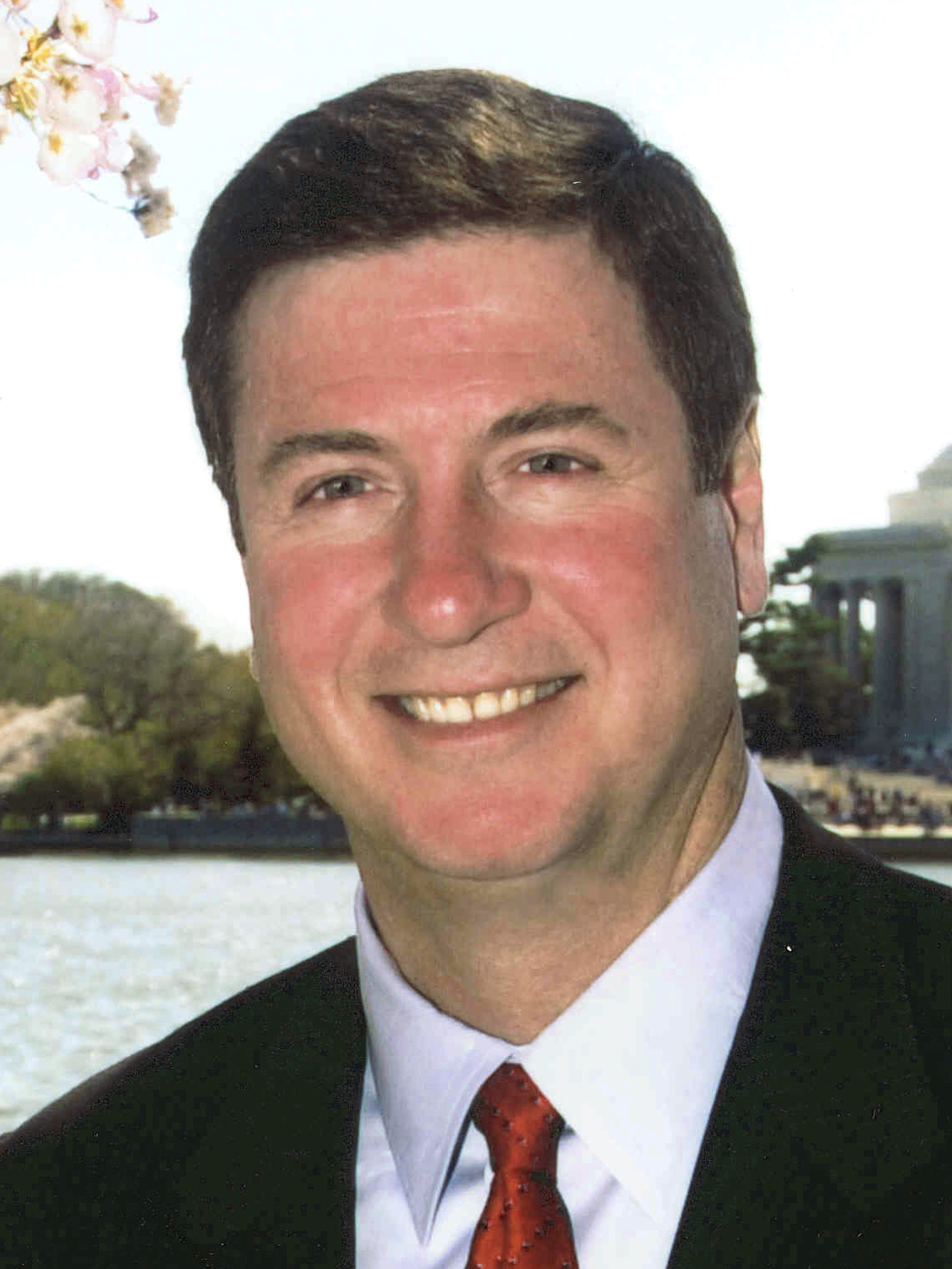
Nominee	Tim Kaine	George Allen
Party	Democratic	Republican
Popular vote	2,010,067	1,785,542
Percentage	52.83%	46.93%
- Kaine: 50–60% 60–70% 70–80% 80–90% >90% Allen: 50–60% 60–70% 70–80% 80–90% >90% Tie: 50%
U.S. senator before election
Jim Webb
Democratic
Elected U.S. Senator
Tim Kaine
Democratic

The 2012 United States Senate election in Virginia took place on November 6, 2012, concurrently with the 2012 U.S. presidential election, other elections to the United States Senate and House of Representatives, and various state and local elections. Incumbent Democratic U.S. Senator Jim Webb retired instead of running for reelection to a second term, and former Democratic governor of Virginia Tim Kaine won the open seat over Republican former senator and governor George Allen. Kaine was unopposed for the Democratic nomination, and the Republicans nominated Allen through a primary on June 12, 2012. Allen had previously held this seat for one term before narrowly losing reelection to Webb in 2006. This was the first open election for this seat since 1988.

== Democratic Party ==
=== Nominee ===
- Tim Kaine, former governor of Virginia and former Democratic National Committee chairman

== Republican primary ==
In Virginia, parties have the option of whether to hold a primary or to nominate their candidate through a party convention. In November 2010, the Virginia GOP announced that it had chosen to hold a primary.

=== Candidates ===
==== Nominee ====
- George Allen, former U.S. senator and former governor of Virginia

==== Eliminated in primary ====
- E. W. Jackson, minister and conservative activist
- Bob Marshall, state delegate and candidate in 2008
- Jamie Radtke, conservative activist

==== Withdrawn ====
- Tim Donner, founder of Horizons Television and LibertyNation.com
- David McCormick, attorney

==== Declined ====
- Liz Cheney, former principal deputy assistant secretary of state for Near Eastern affairs
- Ken Cuccinelli, Virginia attorney general
- Tom Davis, former U.S. representative
- Corey Stewart, Prince William County Board of Supervisors chairman

=== Debates ===
Three debates between Republican candidates were announced before the primary on June 12, 2012. The debates took place in Richmond, Northern Virginia, and Hampton Roads.

=== Polling ===
Poll source	Date(s) administered	Sample size	Margin of error	George Allen	Other candidates	Undecided
Public Policy Polling	February 24–27, 2011	400	±4.9%	52%	25%	23%
Public Policy Polling	July 21–24, 2011	400	±4.9%	58%	23%	19%
Public Policy Polling	December 11–13, 2011	350	±5.2%	53%	25%	22%

Poll source	Date(s) administered	Sample size	Margin of error	George Allen	E. W. Jackson	Bob Marshall	David McCormick	Jamie Radtke	Undecided
Public Policy Polling	July 21–24, 2011	400	±4.9%	68%	2%	2%	0%	6%	22%
Public Policy Polling	December 11–13, 2011	350	±5.2%	67%	2%	3%	2%	5%	21%
Public Policy Polling	April 26–29, 2012	400	±4.9%	66%	2%	8%	—	3%	20%
The Washington Post	April 28 – May 2, 2012	1,101	±3.5%	62%	3%	12%	—	5%	18%

=== Endorsements ===
George Allen
- Bill Bolling, lt. governor of Virginia and president of the Virginia State Senate
- Ron Johnson, U.S. senator from Wisconsin
- Bob McDonnell, governor of Virginia
- Marco Rubio, U.S. senator from Florida
- Corey Stewart, Prince William County Board of Supervisors chairman
Jamie Radtke
- Bob Arment, Louisa County Republican Party chairman
- Steve Arrington, Bedford County supervisor
- James Fisher, Fauquier County commonwealth's attorney
- Jeff Frederick, former Virginia House of Delegates member
- Joe Glover, Family Policy Network president
- Jack Reid, former Virginia House of Delegates member
- Eva Scott, former Virginia state senator
- John Sharp, Bedford County supervisor
- Richard Viguerie, conservative activist

=== Results ===
Republican primary results
Party	Candidate	Votes	%
Republican	George Allen	167,607	65.5
Republican	Jamie Radtke	59,005	23.0
Republican	Bob Marshall	17,302	6.8
Republican	E. W. Jackson	12,083	4.7
Total votes		255,997	100

== Hank the Cat ==
On February 27, 2012, a Maine Coon cat named Hank the Cat was announced to be running a write-in campaign as a joke candidate. Hank's campaign raised US$16,000 for animal charities throughout the world.

== General election ==
=== Candidates ===
- George Allen (Republican), former U.S. senator, former governor of Virginia and former U.S. representative from Virginia's 7th congressional district (1991–1993)
- Tim Kaine (Democratic), former governor of Virginia and former Democratic National Committee chairman

Only Allen and Kaine qualified for the ballot.

=== Debates ===
David Gregory moderated a debate between Kaine and Allen on September 20, 2012. Topics included partisan gridlock in Washington policy making, job creation, tax policy, and Middle East unrest.

External links

- Complete video of debate, September 20, 2012 - C-SPAN
- Complete video of debate, October 8, 2012 - C-SPAN
- Complete video of debate, October 18, 2012 - C-SPAN

=== Campaign ===
Once incumbent U.S. Senator Jim Webb decided to retire, many Democratic candidates were speculated. These included U.S. Congressmen Rick Boucher, Gerry Connolly, Glenn Nye, Tom Perriello and Bobby Scott. However, they all declined and encouraged Kaine to run for the seat, believing he would be by far the most electable candidate. Courtney Lynch, former Marine Corps Officer and Fairfax business consultant and Julien Modica, former CEO of the Brain Trauma Recovery & Policy Institute, eventually withdrew from the election, allowing Kaine to be unopposed in the Democratic primary.

=== Fundraising ===
Candidate (party)	Receipts	Disbursements	Cash on hand	Debt
Tim Kaine (D)	$10,390,929	$7,666,452	$2,724,476	$0
George Allen (R)	$8,015,948	$4,678,004	$3,337,942	$0
Kevin Chisholm (I)	$24,165	$24,162	$0	$0
Terrence Modglin (I)	$5,655	$5,389	$266	$0
Source: Federal Election Commission

==== Top contributors ====
Tim Kaine	Contribution	George Allen	Contribution	Kevin Chisholm	Contribution
League of Conservation Voters	$76,568	McGuireWoods LLP	$76,950	Valu Net	$2,475
Akin Gump Strauss Hauer & Feld	$51,650	Altria Group	$64,749	Geolq Inc	$1,500
University of Virginia	$42,075	Alpha Natural Resources	$38,000		
McGuireWoods LLP	$38,550	Elliott Management Corporation	$35,913		
Covington & Burling	$36,700	Koch Industries	$35,000		
DLA Piper	$31,750	Lorillard Tobacco Company	$34,715		
Bain Capital	$30,000	Alliance Resource Partners	$33,500		
Skadden, Arps, Slate, Meagher & Flom	$28,250	Dominion Resources	$31,800		
Patton Boggs LLP	$26,750	Norfolk Southern	$31,550		
Norfolk Southern	$26,000	Boeing	$23,750		

==== Top industries ====
Tim Kaine	Contribution	George Allen	Contribution	Kevin Chisholm	Contribution	Terrence Modglin	Contribution
Lawyers/law firms	$1,297,792	Retired	$709,693	Misc. energy	$250	Lawyers/law firms	$200
Retired	$762,722	Real estate	$384,038				
Financial institutions	$477,700	Lawyers/law firms	$348,459				
Business services	$373,900	Financial institutions	$299,115				
Real estate	$372,829	Leadership PACs	$277,000				
Lobbyists	$287,545	Lobbyists	$275,600				
Education	$282,475	Mining	$197,206				
Misc. finance	$218,600	Oil & gas	$196,400				
Leadership PACs	$201,500	Insurance	$159,065				
Entertainment industry	$156,279	Misc. finance	$157,963				

==== Independent expenditures ====
In early October 2012, Crossroads GPS announced it would launch a $16 million advertising buy in national races, of which four were this and three other Senate elections.

=== Predictions ===
Source	Ranking	As of
The Cook Political Report	Tossup	November 1, 2012
Sabato's Crystal Ball	Lean D	November 5, 2012
Rothenberg Political Report	Tossup	November 2, 2012
Real Clear Politics	Tossup	November 5, 2012

=== Polling ===
Poll source	Date(s) administered	Sample size	Margin of error	Tim Kaine (D)	George Allen (R)	Other	Undecided
Public Policy Polling	November 10–13, 2010	551	±4.2%	50%	44%	—	6%
Public Policy Polling	February 24–27, 2011	524	±3.5%	47%	47%	—	6%
The Washington Post	April 28 – May 4, 2011	1,040	±3.5%	46%	46%	—	6%
Public Policy Polling	May 5–8, 2011	547	±4.2%	46%	44%	—	10%
Quinnipiac	June 21–27, 2011	1,434	±2.6%	43%	42%	2%	11%
Public Policy Polling	July 21–24, 2011	500	±4.4%	46%	43%	—	11%
Quinnipiac	September 7–12, 2011	1,368	±4.0%	44%	45%	1%	9%
Rasmussen Reports	September 28, 2011	500	±4.5%	46%	45%	3%	7%
CNU/Times-Dispatch	October 3–8, 2011	1,027	±3.1%	44%	42%	3%	12%
Quinnipiac	October 3–9, 2011	1,459	±2.6%	45%	44%	1%	9%
Public Policy Polling	December 10–12, 2011	600	±4.0%	47%	42%	—	11%
Quinnipiac	December 13–19, 2011	1,135	±2.9%	42%	44%	1%	12%
Mason-Dixon	January 16–18, 2012	625	±3.9%	46%	46%	—	8%
Quinnipiac	February 1–6, 2012	1,544	±2.5%	45%	44%	1%	9%
CNU/Times-Dispatch	February 4–13, 2012	1,018	±3.1%	40%	42%	2%	16%
Rasmussen Reports	February 21, 2012	500	±4.5%	46%	46%	3%	5%
Roanoke College	February 13–26, 2012	607	±4.0%	37%	45%	—	19%
NBC News/Marist	February 29 – March 2, 2012	2,518	±2%	48%	39%	—	14%
Quinnipiac	March 13–18, 2012	1,034	±3.1%	47%	44%	1%	8%
Rasmussen Reports	March 20, 2012	500	±4.5%	44%	46%	3%	7%
Roanoke College	March 26 – April 5, 2012	537	±4.2%	39%	46%	—	15%
Rasmussen Reports	April 23, 2012	500	±4.5%	45%	46%	4%	5%
Public Policy Polling	April 26–29, 2012	680	±3.8%	46%	45%	—	9%
The Washington Post	April 28 – May 2, 2012	964	±4%	46%	46%	—	8%
Marist	May 17–20, 2012	1,076	±3%	49%	43%	—	9%
Rasmussen Reports	June 3, 2012	500	±4.5%	46%	44%	3%	6%
Quinnipiac	May 30 – June 4, 2012	1,282	±2.7%	44%	43%	2%	10%
We Ask America	June 25, 2012	1,106	±2.95%	35%	44%	—	21%
Public Policy Polling	July 5–8, 2012	647	±3.9%	46%	44%	—	11%
Quinnipiac	July 10–16, 2012	1,673	±2.4%	44%	46%	1%	10%
Rasmussen Reports	July 16–17, 2012	500	±4.5%	46%	45%	5%	5%
Quinnipiac	July 31 – August 6, 2012	1,412	±2.6%	48%	46%	—	6%
Rasmussen Reports	August 7, 2012	500	±4.5%	46%	46%	2%	6%
Public Policy Polling	August 16–19, 2012	855	±3.4%	46%	46%	—	9%
Rasmussen Reports	August 23, 2012	500	±4.5%	45%	45%	2%	8%
Gravis Marketing	September 8–9, 2012	2,238	±2.2%	43%	48%	—	10%
NBC/WSJ/Marist Poll	September 9–11, 2012	996	±3.1%	46%	46%	—	8%
Rasmussen Reports	September 13, 2012	500	±4.5%	47%	45%	2%	6%
The Washington Post	September 12–16, 2012	847	±4%	51%	43%	3%	4%
Public Policy Polling	September 13–16, 2012	1,021	±3.1%	47%	46%	—	7%
CBS/The New York Times/Quinnipiac	September 11–17, 2012	1,485	±2.5%	51%	44%	—	5%
FOX NEWS Poll	September 16–18, 2012	1,006	±3%	47%	43%	1%	9%
Gravis Marketing	September 17, 2012	2,238	±2.2%	43%	48%	—	9%
Huffpost Politics	September 20, 2012	1,000	±3%	46%	45%	—	9%
Suffolk University	September 24–26, 2012	600	±4%	44%	44%	—	12%
NBC/WSJ/Marist Poll	September 30 – October 1, 2012	969	±3.1%	49%	44%	1%	7%
Rasmussen Reports	October 4, 2012	500	±4.5%	52%	45%	—	3%
Public Policy Polling	October 4–7, 2012	725	±3.6%	51%	44%	—	5%
CBS/The New York Times/Quinnipiac	October 4–9, 2012	1,288	±2.7%	51%	44%	—	5%
We Ask America	October 7–9, 2012	1,296	±2.9%	41%	46%	—	13%
NBC/WSJ/Marist Poll	October 7–9, 2012	981	±3.1%	47%	46%	—	7%
Rasmussen Reports	October 11, 2012	750	±4.0%	48%	47%	1%	4%
Old Dominion University	September 19 – October 17, 2012	465	±3.4%	50%	43%	—	6%
Rasmussen Reports	October 18, 2012	500	±4.0%	49%	48%	3%	—
Rasmussen Reports	October 24, 2012	750	±4.0%	49%	48%	3%	—
The Washington Post	October 22–26, 2012	1,228	±3.5%	51%	44%	—	5%
Roanoke College	October 23–26, 2012	638	±4.0%	42%	47%	—	10%
Gravis Marketing	October 26, 2012	645	±3.9%	46%	48%	—	5%
CBS/The New York Times/Quinnipiac	October 23–28, 2012	1,074	±3%	50%	46%	—	4%
Reuters/Ipsos	October 29–31, 2012	703	±4.2%	47%	45%	1%	7%
Reuters/Ipsos	October 29–31, 2012	855	±3.8%	50%	38%	1%	11%
WeAskAmerica	October 30 – November 1, 2012	1,069	±3%	50%	50%	—	—
NBC/WSJ/Marist	November 1–2, 2012	1,165	±2.9%	49%	46%	—	4%
Public Policy Polling	November 3–4, 2012	975	±3.1%	52%	46%	—	2%
Rasmussen Reports	November 4, 2012	750	±4%	49%	47%	1%	4%

Hypothetical polling

Democratic primary

Poll source	Date(s) administered	Sample size	Margin of error	Rick Boucher	Tim Kaine	Tom Perriello	Gerry Connolly	Glenn Nye	Bobby Scott	Doug Wilder	Other/ Undecided
Public Policy Polling	February 24–27, 2011	400	±4.9%	9%	53%	9%	3%	1%	9%	8%	9%
Public Policy Polling	February 24–27, 2011	400	±4.9%	11%	65%	15%	N/A				9%

General election

Poll source	Date(s) administered	Sample size	Margin of error	Tim Kaine (D)	Bob Marshall (R)	Other	Undecided
Public Policy Polling	February 24–27, 2011	524	±3.5%	49%	35%	—	16%
CNU/Times-Dispatch	February 4–13, 2012	1,018	±3.1%	39%	28%	4%	29%
Public Policy Polling	April 26–29, 2012	680	±3.8%	49%	36%	—	15%

Poll source	Date(s) administered	Sample size	Margin of error	Tim Kaine (D)	Jamie Radtke (R)	Other	Undecided
Public Policy Polling	February 24–27, 2011	524	±3.5%	49%	33%	—	17%
The Washington Post	April 28 – May 4, 2011	1,040	±3.5%	57%	31%	1%	9%
Public Policy Polling	May 5–8, 2011	547	±4.2%	49%	33%	—	18%
Public Policy Polling	July 21–24, 2011	500	±4.4%	47%	31%	—	22%
CNU/Times-Dispatch	October 3–8, 2011	1,027	±3.1%	46%	32%	3%	19%
Public Policy Polling	December 10–12, 2011	600	±4.0%	49%	33%	—	19%
CNU/Times-Dispatch	February 4–13, 2012	1,018	±3.1%	40%	26%	3%	31%
Public Policy Polling	April 26–29, 2012	680	±3.8%	50%	35%	—	15%

with Rick Boucher

Poll source	Date(s) administered	Sample size	Margin of error	Rick Boucher (D)	George Allen (R)	Other	Undecided
Public Policy Polling	February 24–27, 2011	524	±3.5	42%	47%	—	11%

Poll source	Date(s) administered	Sample size	Margin of error	Rick Boucher (D)	Bob Marshall (R)	Other	Undecided
Public Policy Polling	February 24–27, 2011	524	±3.5%	40%	32%	—	28%

Poll source	Date(s) administered	Sample size	Margin of error	Rick Boucher (D)	Jamie Radtke (R)	Other	Undecided
Public Policy Polling	February 24–27, 2011	524	±3.5%	40%	29%	—	31%

with Tom Perriello

Poll source	Date(s) administered	Sample size	Margin of error	Tom Perriello (D)	George Allen (R)	Other	Undecided
Public Policy Polling	November 10–13, 2010	551	±4.2%	42%	47%	—	11%
Public Policy Polling	February 24–27, 2011	524	±3.5%	41%	48%	—	11%

Poll source	Date(s) administered	Sample size	Margin of error	Tom Perriello (D)	Bob Marshall (R)	Other	Undecided
Public Policy Polling	February 24–27, 2011	524	±3.5%	39%	35%	—	26%

Poll source	Date(s) administered	Sample size	Margin of error	Tom Periello (D)	Jamie Radtke (R)	Other	Undecided
Public Policy Polling	February 24–27, 2011	524	±3.5%	40%	32%	—	28%

with Bobby Scott

Poll source	Date(s) administered	Sample size	Margin of error	Bobby Scott (D)	George Allen (R)	Other	Undecided
Public Policy Polling	May 5–8, 2011	547	±4.2%	39%	44%	—	17%

Poll source	Date(s) administered	Sample size	Margin of error	Bobby Scott (D)	Jamie Radtke (R)	Other	Undecided
Public Policy Polling	May 5–8, 2011	547	±4.2%	39%	34%	—	27%

with Jim Webb

Poll source	Date(s) administered	Sample size	Margin of error	Jim Webb (D)	George Allen (R)	Other	Undecided
Public Policy Polling	July 31 – August 3, 2009	579	—	43%	44%	—	13%
Public Policy Polling	November 10–13, 2010	551	±4.2%	49%	45%	—	6%
Clarus Research Group	December 7–9, 2010	600	±4.0%	41%	40%	—	19%

Poll source	Date(s) administered	Sample size	Margin of error	Jim Webb (D)	Bill Bolling (R)	Other	Undecided
Public Policy Polling	November 10–13, 2010	551	±4.2%	48%	39%	—	12%

Poll source	Date(s) administered	Sample size	Margin of error	Jim Webb (D)	Bob McDonnell (R)	Other	Undecided
Clarus Research Group	December 7–9, 2010	600	±4.0%	39%	42%	—	19%

=== Results ===
2012 United States Senate election in Virginia
Party	Candidate	Votes	%	±%
Democratic	Tim Kaine	2,010,067	52.83%	+3.24%
Republican	George Allen	1,785,542	46.93%	−2.27%
Write-in		9,410	0.25%	+0.15%
Total votes		3,805,019	100.00%	N/A
Democratic hold				

==== By county and independent city ====
Locality	Tim Kaine Democratic		George Allen Republican		Write-in Various		Margin		Total votes cast
Locality	#	%	#	%	#	%	#	%	Total votes cast
Accomack	7,521	48.29%	8,041	51.63%	13	0.08%	−520	−3.34%	15,575
Albemarle	30,973	57.95%	22,342	41.80%	136	0.25%	8,631	16.15%	53,451
Alexandria	52,502	72.65%	19,498	26.98%	267	0.37%	33,004	45.67%	72,267
Alleghany	3,507	47.98%	3,798	51.96%	4	0.05%	−291	−3.98%	7,309
Amelia	2,481	36.69%	4,276	63.24%	5	0.07%	−1,795	−26.55%	6,762
Amherst	6,073	40.49%	8,905	59.37%	20	0.13%	−2,832	−18.88%	14,998
Appomattox	2,568	32.83%	5,244	67.03%	11	0.14%	−2,676	−34.21%	7,823
Arlington	82,689	71.42%	32,807	28.34%	279	0.24%	49,882	43.09%	115,775
Augusta	9,879	28.99%	24,153	70.87%	49	0.14%	−14,274	−41.88%	34,081
Bath	890	39.17%	1,374	60.48%	8	0.35%	−484	−21.30%	2,272
Bedford City	1,180	43.66%	1,520	56.23%	3	0.11%	−340	−12.58%	2,703
Bedford County	10,669	28.93%	26,160	70.94%	49	0.13%	−15,491	−42.01%	36,878
Bland	850	28.50%	2,132	71.50%	0	0.00%	−1,282	−42.99%	2,982
Botetourt	5,898	32.44%	12,253	67.39%	31	0.17%	−6,355	−34.95%	18,182
Bristol	2,682	36.75%	4,594	62.96%	21	0.29%	−1,912	−26.20%	7,297
Brunswick	4,736	60.62%	3,071	39.31%	6	0.08%	1,665	21.31%	7,813
Buchanan	3,408	35.72%	6,132	64.26%	2	0.02%	−2,724	−28.55%	9,542
Buckingham	3,654	50.28%	3,610	49.68%	3	0.04%	44	0.61%	7,267
Buena Vista	964	39.35%	1,478	60.33%	8	0.33%	−514	−20.98%	2,450
Campbell	7,900	30.58%	17,904	69.31%	29	0.11%	−10,004	−38.73%	25,833
Caroline	7,329	54.51%	6,057	45.05%	59	0.44%	1,272	9.46%	13,445
Carroll	4,075	32.11%	8,596	67.74%	18	0.14%	−4,521	−35.63%	12,689
Charles City	2,706	65.58%	1,413	34.25%	7	0.17%	1,293	31.34%	4,126
Charlotte	2,516	42.79%	3,364	57.21%	0	0.00%	−848	−14.42%	5,880
Charlottesville	16,800	78.40%	4,589	21.42%	39	0.18%	12,211	56.99%	21,428
Chesapeake	56,109	51.71%	52,182	48.09%	226	0.21%	3,927	3.62%	108,517
Chesterfield	81,239	47.85%	88,142	51.91%	401	0.24%	−6,903	−4.07%	169,782
Clarke	3,419	44.64%	4,224	55.15%	16	0.21%	−805	−10.51%	7,659
Colonial Heights	2,662	31.51%	5,772	68.32%	14	0.17%	−3,110	−36.81%	8,448
Covington	1,306	54.90%	1,071	45.02%	2	0.08%	235	9.88%	2,379
Craig	883	33.43%	1,755	66.45%	3	0.11%	−872	−33.02%	2,641
Culpeper	8,457	41.82%	11,743	58.07%	21	0.10%	−3,286	−16.25%	20,221
Cumberland	2,411	48.57%	2,544	51.25%	9	0.18%	−133	−2.68%	4,964
Danville	11,840	59.90%	7,902	39.98%	23	0.12%	3,938	19.92%	19,765
Dickenson	2,768	40.50%	4,064	59.47%	2	0.03%	−1,296	−18.96%	6,834
Dinwiddie	6,489	48.49%	6,880	51.42%	12	0.09%	−391	−2.92%	13,381
Emporia	1,685	63.78%	957	36.22%	0	0.00%	728	27.55%	2,642
Essex	2,964	53.59%	2,562	46.32%	5	0.09%	402	7.27%	5,531
Fairfax City	6,728	58.83%	4,682	40.94%	26	0.23%	2,046	17.89%	11,436
Fairfax County	319,748	61.09%	201,414	38.48%	2,222	0.42%	118,334	22.61%	523,384
Falls Church	5,147	71.22%	2,051	28.38%	29	0.40%	3,096	42.84%	7,227
Fauquier	14,351	40.79%	20,745	58.96%	87	0.25%	−6,394	−18.17%	35,183
Floyd	2,968	39.39%	4,551	60.41%	15	0.20%	−1,583	−21.01%	7,534
Fluvanna	5,945	47.25%	6,618	52.60%	19	0.15%	−673	−5.35%	12,582
Franklin City	2,651	64.36%	1,464	35.54%	4	0.10%	1,187	28.82%	4,119
Franklin County	9,870	37.40%	16,478	62.44%	43	0.16%	−6,608	−25.04%	26,391
Frederick	13,342	37.19%	22,464	62.62%	65	0.18%	−9,122	−25.43%	35,871
Fredericksburg	7,233	64.43%	3,957	35.25%	36	0.32%	3,276	29.18%	11,226
Galax	981	42.82%	1,309	57.14%	1	0.04%	−328	−14.32%	2,291
Giles	3,082	39.86%	4,640	60.01%	10	0.13%	−1,558	−20.15%	7,732
Gloucester	7,195	37.34%	12,044	62.51%	29	0.15%	−4,849	−25.17%	19,268
Goochland	5,050	38.39%	8,082	61.43%	24	0.18%	−3,032	−23.05%	13,156
Grayson	2,398	33.99%	4,657	66.01%	0	0.00%	−2,259	−32.02%	7,055
Greene	3,374	37.77%	5,552	62.16%	6	0.07%	−2,178	−24.38%	8,932
Greensville	3,014	62.66%	1,794	37.30%	2	0.04%	1,220	25.36%	4,810
Halifax	7,649	46.21%	8,878	53.63%	26	0.16%	−1,229	−7.42%	16,553
Hampton	46,432	71.09%	18,732	28.68%	146	0.22%	27,700	42.41%	65,310
Hanover	20,003	34.14%	38,432	65.59%	160	0.27%	−18,429	−31.45%	58,595
Harrisonburg	8,507	55.90%	6,681	43.90%	31	0.20%	1,826	12.00%	15,219
Henrico	93,124	57.88%	67,015	41.65%	747	0.46%	26,109	16.23%	160,886
Henry	10,365	42.80%	13,831	57.12%	19	0.08%	−3,466	−14.31%	24,215
Highland	477	33.26%	957	66.74%	0	0.00%	−480	−33.47%	1,434
Hopewell	5,087	57.13%	3,809	42.77%	9	0.10%	1,278	14.35%	8,905
Isle of Wight	8,860	43.16%	11,645	56.72%	25	0.12%	−2,785	−13.57%	20,530
James City	18,878	46.12%	21,957	53.64%	101	0.25%	−3,079	−7.52%	40,936
King and Queen	1,806	48.94%	1,877	50.87%	7	0.19%	−71	−1.92%	3,690
King George	4,625	41.25%	6,565	58.56%	21	0.19%	−1,940	−17.30%	11,211
King William	3,470	39.15%	5,371	60.60%	22	0.25%	−1,901	−21.45%	8,863
Lancaster	3,241	47.10%	3,622	52.64%	18	0.26%	−381	−5.54%	6,881
Lee	2,883	30.41%	6,588	69.50%	8	0.08%	−3,705	−39.09%	9,479
Lexington	1,573	58.61%	1,102	41.06%	9	0.34%	471	17.55%	2,684
Loudoun	83,383	52.78%	74,325	47.05%	277	0.18%	9,058	5.73%	157,985
Louisa	7,232	44.39%	9,036	55.46%	24	0.15%	−1,804	−11.07%	16,292
Lunenburg	2,616	46.63%	2,985	53.21%	9	0.16%	−369	−6.58%	5,610
Lynchburg	16,129	45.04%	19,601	54.73%	83	0.23%	−3,472	−9.69%	35,813
Madison	2,678	40.18%	3,978	59.68%	9	0.14%	−1,300	−19.50%	6,665
Manassas	8,322	55.86%	6,550	43.96%	27	0.18%	1,772	11.89%	14,899
Manassas Park	2,829	61.55%	1,752	38.12%	15	0.33%	1,077	23.43%	4,596
Martinsville	3,811	62.27%	2,300	37.58%	9	0.15%	1,511	24.69%	6,120
Mathews	1,907	36.02%	3,383	63.89%	5	0.09%	−1,476	−27.88%	5,295
Mecklenburg	6,344	44.11%	8,037	55.89%	0	0.00%	−1,693	−11.77%	14,381
Middlesex	2,455	41.27%	3,489	58.65%	5	0.08%	−1,034	−17.38%	5,949
Montgomery	20,875	51.81%	19,335	47.99%	83	0.21%	1,540	3.82%	40,293
Nelson	4,215	51.58%	3,946	48.29%	11	0.13%	269	3.29%	8,172
New Kent	3,815	34.99%	7,070	64.84%	18	0.17%	−3,255	−29.85%	10,903
Newport News	50,800	64.81%	27,332	34.87%	247	0.32%	23,468	29.94%	78,379
Norfolk	61,887	72.69%	22,953	26.96%	295	0.35%	38,934	45.73%	85,135
Northampton	3,735	58.85%	2,606	41.06%	6	0.09%	1,129	17.79%	6,347
Northumberland	3,253	43.50%	4,220	56.43%	5	0.07%	−967	−12.93%	7,478
Norton	620	41.89%	859	58.04%	1	0.07%	−239	−16.15%	1,480
Nottoway	3,294	49.74%	3,327	50.23%	2	0.03%	−33	−0.50%	6,623
Orange	6,972	43.18%	9,114	56.44%	62	0.38%	−2,142	−13.26%	16,148
Page	3,806	37.30%	6,376	62.49%	22	0.22%	−2,570	−25.19%	10,204
Patrick	2,679	32.57%	5,537	67.31%	10	0.12%	−2,858	−34.74%	8,226
Petersburg	13,882	89.64%	1,569	10.13%	35	0.23%	12,313	79.51%	15,486
Pittsylvania	11,027	36.08%	19,520	63.87%	17	0.06%	−8,493	−27.79%	30,564
Poquoson	1,844	26.14%	5,194	73.64%	15	0.21%	−3,350	−47.50%	7,053
Portsmouth	32,281	71.40%	12,818	28.35%	114	0.25%	19,463	43.05%	45,213
Powhatan	4,470	29.05%	10,887	70.76%	29	0.19%	−6,417	−41.71%	15,386
Prince Edward	5,118	55.48%	4,100	44.44%	7	0.08%	1,018	11.04%	9,225
Prince George	7,052	44.51%	8,778	55.41%	12	0.08%	−1,726	−10.90%	15,842
Prince William	102,859	57.79%	74,809	42.03%	320	0.18%	28,050	15.76%	177,988
Pulaski	5,732	39.62%	8,717	60.25%	19	0.13%	−2,985	−20.63%	14,468
Radford	2,839	53.52%	2,453	46.24%	13	0.25%	386	7.28%	5,305
Rappahannock	2,036	47.17%	2,272	52.64%	8	0.19%	−236	−5.47%	4,316
Richmond City	76,783	79.83%	19,081	19.84%	323	0.34%	57,702	59.99%	96,187
Richmond County	1,550	42.12%	2,122	57.66%	8	0.22%	−572	−15.54%	3,680
Roanoke City	24,871	62.91%	14,601	36.93%	61	0.15%	10,270	25.98%	39,533
Roanoke County	20,008	39.53%	30,530	60.32%	73	0.14%	−10,522	−20.79%	50,611
Rockbridge	4,195	40.85%	6,063	59.04%	11	0.11%	−1,868	−18.19%	10,269
Rockingham	10,015	29.11%	24,340	70.75%	47	0.14%	−14,325	−41.64%	34,402
Russell	4,243	35.46%	7,714	64.48%	7	0.06%	−3,471	−29.01%	11,964
Salem	5,138	42.16%	7,032	57.70%	18	0.15%	−1,894	−15.54%	12,188
Scott	2,776	28.02%	7,122	71.88%	10	0.10%	−4,346	−43.86%	9,908
Shenandoah	6,630	34.74%	12,411	65.04%	42	0.22%	−5,781	−30.29%	19,083
Smyth	4,562	36.23%	8,022	63.71%	8	0.06%	−3,460	−27.48%	12,592
Southampton	4,440	48.91%	4,627	50.97%	10	0.11%	−187	−2.06%	9,077
Spotsylvania	25,833	45.15%	31,265	54.65%	113	0.20%	−5,432	−9.49%	57,211
Stafford	27,820	46.30%	31,997	53.25%	267	0.44%	−4,177	−6.95%	60,084
Staunton	5,625	51.71%	5,239	48.17%	13	0.12%	386	3.55%	10,877
Suffolk	24,247	57.97%	17,544	41.94%	37	0.09%	6,703	16.03%	41,828
Surry	2,553	60.48%	1,658	39.28%	10	0.24%	895	21.20%	4,221
Sussex	3,278	61.36%	2,057	38.51%	7	0.13%	1,221	22.86%	5,342
Tazewell	4,318	24.24%	13,477	75.67%	15	0.08%	−9,159	−51.43%	17,810
Virginia Beach	96,465	50.16%	95,390	49.60%	460	0.24%	1,075	0.56%	192,315
Warren	6,616	40.33%	9,747	59.42%	41	0.25%	−3,131	−19.09%	16,404
Washington	7,916	31.21%	17,417	68.67%	29	0.11%	−9,501	−37.46%	25,362
Waynesboro	3,873	44.71%	4,775	55.13%	14	0.16%	−902	−10.41%	8,662
Westmoreland	4,331	53.81%	3,703	46.01%	14	0.17%	628	7.80%	8,048
Williamsburg	5,037	66.33%	2,546	33.53%	11	0.14%	2,491	32.80%	7,594
Winchester	5,292	52.16%	4,816	47.47%	38	0.37%	476	4.69%	10,146
Wise	4,236	28.68%	10,520	71.24%	12	0.08%	−6,284	−42.55%	14,768
Wythe	4,031	33.09%	8,080	66.33%	70	0.57%	−4,049	−33.24%	12,181
York	13,849	41.15%	19,745	58.67%	59	0.18%	−5,896	−17.52%	33,653
Totals	2,010,067	52.83%	1,785,542	46.93%	9,410	0.25%	224,525	5.90%	3,805,019

==== Counties and independent cities that flipped from Democratic to Republican ====
- Buchanan (largest city: Grundy)
- Dickenson (largest borough: Clintwood)
- Alleghany (largest borough: Clifton Forge)
- Russell (largest city: Lebanon)
- Norton (independent city)

==== Counties and independent cities that flipped from Republican to Democratic ====
- Buckingham (largest borough: Buckingham)
- Chesapeake (independent city)
- Essex (largest borough: Tappahannock)
- Harrisonburg (independent city)
- Henrico (largest borough: Richmond)
- Hopewell (independent city)
- Manassas (independent city)
- Staunton (independent city)
- Winchester (independent city)
- Virginia Beach (independent city)
- Prince Edward (largest municipality: Farmville)
- Danville (independent city)

==== By congressional district ====
Kaine won six of 11 congressional districts, including three held by Republicans.

District	Allen	Kaine	Representative
1st	53%	47%	Rob Wittman
2nd	48%	52%	Scott Rigell
3rd	21%	79%	Robert C. Scott
4th	49.9%	50.1%	Randy Forbes
5th	53%	47%	Robert Hurt
6th	59%	41%	Bob Goodlatte
7th	55%	45%	Eric Cantor
8th	31%	69%	Jim Moran
9th	62%	38%	Morgan Griffith
10th	49.6%	50.4%	Frank Wolf
11th	36%	64%	Gerry Connolly

== See also ==
- Hank the Cat
- 2012 United States Senate elections
- 2012 United States House of Representatives elections in Virginia
