= Pete Snyder =

American businessman

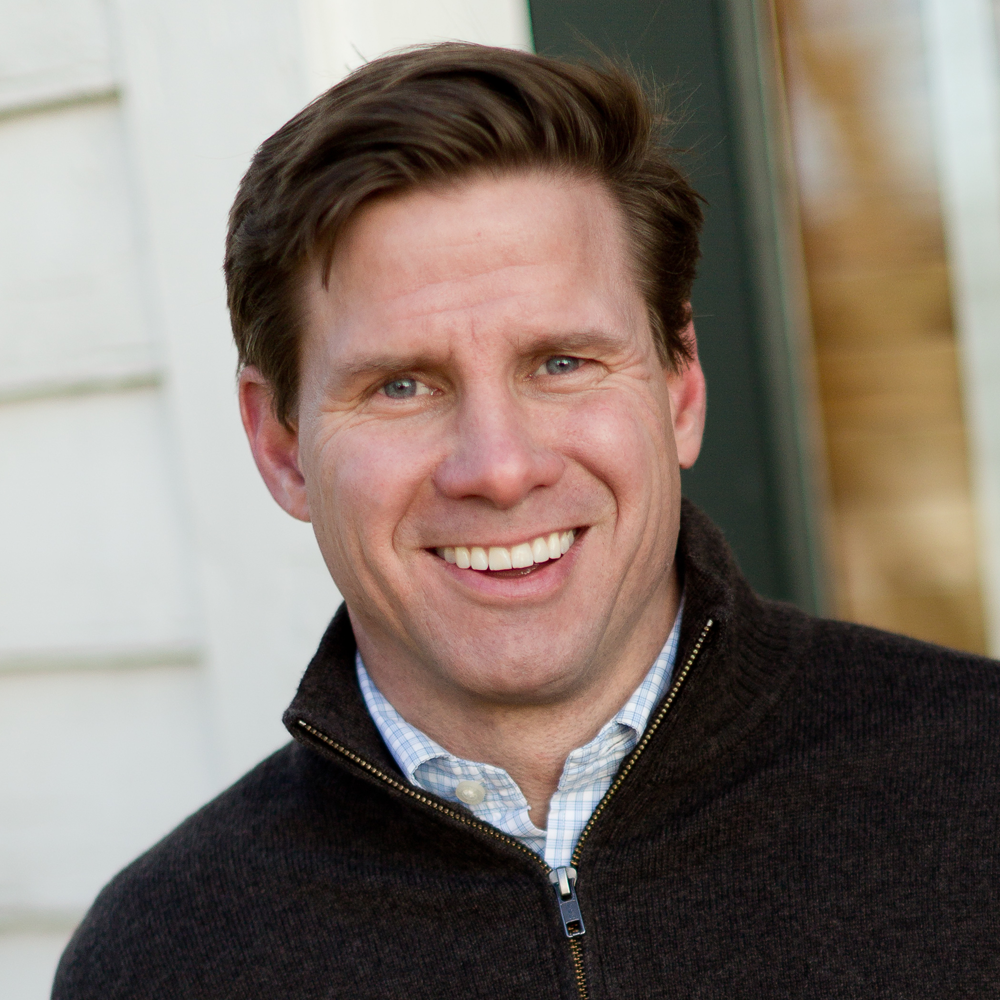
- Snyder in 2013

United States Ambassador to Ecuador
- Nominee
- Assuming office TBD
- President: Donald Trump
- Succeeding: Lawrence Petroni (chargé d'affaires)

Personal details
- Born: August 5, 1972 (age 54)
- Party: Republican
- Education: College of William and Mary (BA)

Pete Snyder (born August 5, 1972) is an American entrepreneur and marketing executive who is best known as the founder and former chief executive officer of New Media Strategies (NMS), a social media marketing agency that he started in 1999. Snyder stepped down as CEO of NMS in 2011 and founded the angel investment firm Disruptor Capital in 2012.

Snyder unsuccessfully ran in the Republican primary for lieutenant governor of Virginia in 2013. Snyder declined to run for the Republican nomination for governor in 2017, instead chairing the campaign of Ed Gillespie. In 2021, he sought the Republican nomination for governor of Virginia. He finished in second place, behind eventual general election winner Glenn Youngkin.

In June 2026, Snyder was nominated by President Donald Trump to serve as the U.S. Ambassador to Ecuador.

== Early career ==
Snyder's early career included stints as the Director of Public Affairs at BrabenderCox and the Senior Political Director for Luntz Research Companies. He first gained recognition as a pollster to New York City mayor Rudy Giuliani during the 1997 mayoral campaign.

== New Media Strategies ==
Snyder launched New Media Strategies in November 1999 with $150,000 from his own savings, credit cards, and the investments of friends and family, initially running the company from his Capitol Hill apartment. Based on his market research experience, Snyder chose to treat the Internet as "the world's largest focus group," creating the first Internet firm to offer data mining and real-time communications consultation to clients. The company found its earliest success with Hollywood studios, and soon counted The Walt Disney Company, Coca-Cola, Burger King, AT&T, NBC and Ford among its clients. In 2006 Snyder was named a Fortune Small Business Best Boss. Drawing upon his background in political consulting, Snyder expanded the company by creating a public affairs division, which has included both political and news media clients such as the Fred Thompson presidential campaign and C-SPAN. The Washington Post has referred to Snyder as a "pioneer in consumer communication", on account of his early entrance into the business of online market research and communications.

In January 2007, Snyder sold his interest in New Media Strategies to Meredith Corporation, continuing his role as CEO through December 2011. At the time of the acquisition Snyder provisioned for a portion of the proceeds to be set aside in an employee stock pool, which appreciated to $2.5 million and in 2010 was paid out to employees who had remained at the company for three years. The New York Post described Snyder's profit-sharing arrangement as atypical in the advertising industry, and in an interview with Advertising Age he was quoted as saying: "this is how it usually goes: A company gets sold, the owners do well, and all the employees get screwed. I wanted to do something really different." In November 2010, he became president of emerging markets group at Meredith, while remaining as CEO of New Media Strategies. In December 2011, Snyder stepped down from the role of CEO of NMS. As of 2012, he remains involved as founder and senior advisor for NMS, and senior advisor for Meredith Corporation. As a result of his work with NMS, Snyder was named one of "Washington's Tech Titans" by Washingtonian magazine in 2009 and 2011.

== Disruptor Capital ==
On January 1, 2012, Snyder formed Disruptor Capital, an angel investment company. Headquartered in Alexandria, Virginia, it invests in and advises startup companies in the technology, media, and public affairs industries. In May, 2012, Snyder was named to Smart CEO Magazine's "Leaders We Admire" list, citing his return "to his roots as a start-up entrepreneur with a passion for disruptive products".

== Virginia 30 Day Fund ==
In response to the devastating economic impact of COVID-19 on small businesses in Virginia, Snyder founded the Virginia 30 Day Fund in April 2020. The VA 30 Day Fund is a non-profit organization that provides forgivable loans for Virginia-based small businesses. Snyder and his wife, Burson, put up $100,000 of their own money to launch the program. It offers immediate aid of up to $3000. By November 2020, over 700 small businesses had received financial assistance. It became the model for similar organizations in Georgia, Pennsylvania, Arkansas, Mississippi, and New Jersey. Dave Portnoy of Barstool Sports created the Barstool Fund which is an affiliate of the 30 Day Fund. Pete and Burson Snyder stepped away from the day-to-day operation of the non-profit in January 2021. Since April, 30 Day Fund-related entities have raised more than $25 million and helped more than 2,500 small businesses, securing 15,000 jobs across the country.

== Politics ==
Virginia Governor Bob McDonnell appointed Snyder as Chairman of VA Victory 2012, a state Republican Party committee focused on efforts and fundraising in Virginia surrounding the 2012 presidential and congressional elections.

Pete Snyder was a candidate for lieutenant governor of Virginia from his announcement in November 2012 until conceding to nominee E. W. Jackson at the Republican Party of Virginia's nominating convention in May 2013.

Snyder was considered a potential candidate for governor in 2017, but he chose not to run and endorsed eventual Republican nominee Ed Gillespie. On December 9, 2016, Pete Snyder was named Chairman of Gillespie's campaign.

During the COVID-19 pandemic, Snyder made false claims about public health measures intended to halt the spread of the virus.

On January 26, 2021, Snyder announced his candidacy for Governor of Virginia. Snyder has refused to state that President Joe Biden legitimately won the 2020 presidential election. Snyder lost the Republican nomination to former Carlyle Group co-CEO Glenn Youngkin.

On June 1, 2026, Snyder was nominated by President Donald Trump to be the U.S. Ambassador to Ecuador.

== Other activities ==
In 2011, Snyder was named to the College of William & Mary Board of Visitors. As of 2011, he also serves on the marketing board of the National Center for Missing and Exploited Children, the board of the U.S. Chamber of Commerce National Chamber Foundation, and on the Board of Trustees of Cushing Academy.

=== Fox News contributor ===
Snyder started making frequent appearances on national television networks in the U.S. in 2000,

On August 6, 2012, Fox News Channel announced that Snyder was joining the cable network as a regular, on-air contributor for Fox News, and Fox Business as an expert on politics and business and entrepreneurship. Snyder was routinely tapped to discuss the implications of national politics, particularly as they relate to the 2012 presidential election, and Virginia's prominent role as a major swing state.

In late 2012, Snyder left Fox News to focus on his lieutenant governor campaign.

=== Turning Point PAC Contributor ===
In 2024, Snyder donated $4,100 to Turning Point PAC according to Federal Election Commission documents.
