= 2015 Virginia House of Delegates election =

2015 Virginia House of Delegates elections
- November 3, 2015

All 100 seats in the Virginia House of Delegates 51 seats needed for a majority
- Turnout: 29.1% ▼13.9
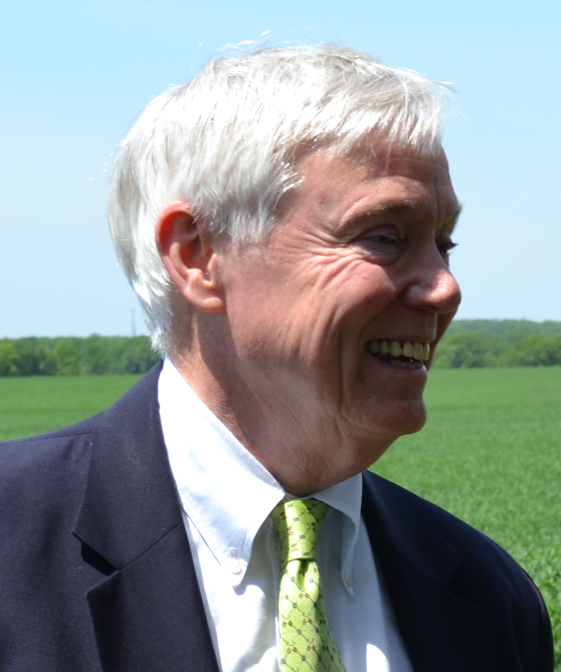

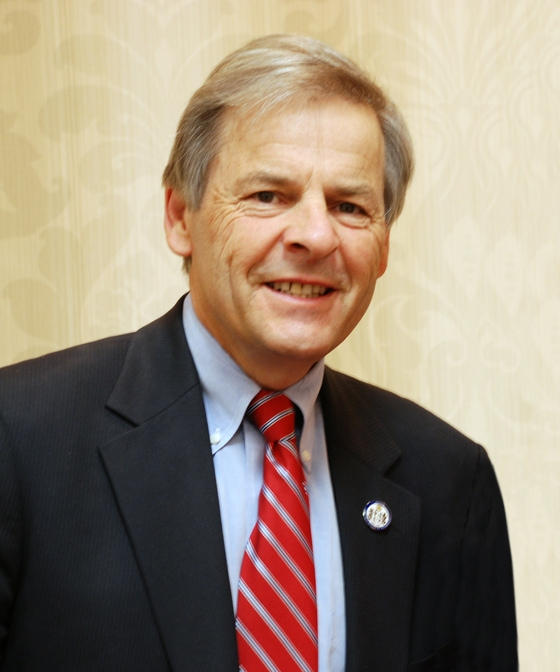
	Majority party	Minority party
Leader	Bill Howell	David Toscano
Party	Republican	Democratic
Leader since	January 8, 2003	November 19, 2011
Leader's seat	28th	57th
Last election	67	33
Seats won	66	34
Seat change	▼1	▲1
Popular vote	798,868	451,865
Percentage	60.8%	34.4%
Swing	▲7.0%	▼6.0%
- Results: Republican hold Republican gain Democratic hold Democratic gain
Speaker before election
Bill Howell
Republican
Elected Speaker
Bill Howell
Republican

The Virginia House of Delegates election of 2015 was held on Tuesday, November 3. All 100 seats of the Virginia House of Delegates were on the ballot. While Republicans maintained an enormous edge against Democrats in the chamber, their net loss of one seat cost them their previously held veto-proof majority against Governor Terry McAuliffe.

== Background ==
The filing deadline for Republicans and Democrats to participate in the June 9 primaries was March 26. Incumbents Mamye BaCote, Ed Scott, Tom Rust, Rob Krupicka, and David Ramadan announced their intent to retire from the House. Joseph E. Preston, Michael Futrell, and Scott Surovell chose to run for the 16th, 29th, and 36th district senate seats, respectively, rather than seek reelection. Freshman delegate and Tea Party activist Mark Berg was defeated in the Republican primary by Chris Collins, and twenty-year incumbent Johnny Joannou was defeated by Steve Heretick in the Democratic primary. Races were uncontested in sixty-two districts, and there was only one major party candidate on the ballot in seventy-one districts.

In October, a three-judge panel of the United States Court of Appeals for the Fourth Circuit upheld the boundaries of twelve House districts in a Democratic Party-supported lawsuit alleging racial gerrymandering.

== Delegates not running for re-election ==
Delegate	Seat	First elected	Party	Date announced	Ref.
Mamye BaCote	95th district	2003	Democratic	January 15, 2015	
Michael Futrell	2nd district	2013	Democratic	December 3, 2014	
Rob Krupicka	45th district	2012	Democratic	March 16, 2015	
Joseph E. Preston	63rd district	2015	Democratic	March 12, 2015	
David Ramadan	87th district	2011	Republican	April 15, 2015	
Tom Rust	86th district	2001	Republican	February 25, 2015	
Ed Scott	30th district	2003	Republican	February 3, 2015	
Scott Surovell	44th district	2009	Democratic	January 18, 2015	

== Results ==
Democrats picked up two seats, with Jennifer Boysko and John Bell being elected to succeed the retiring Tom Rust and David Ramadan. Mark Dudenhefer gave the Republicans a single pickup when he won back the seat he lost two years earlier to Michael Futrell. For the first time since the Virginia Public Access Project started tracking state elections in 1995, every single incumbent running for reelection was successful.

=== Overall ===
↓
66	34
Republican	Democratic

Seats, of total, by party
1. Republican (66.0%)
2. Democratic (34.0%)
Votes, of total, by party
1. Republican (60.8%)
2. Democratic (34.4%)
3. Other (4.83%)

Party	Leader	Delegates				Votes		
Party	Leader		Of total		±		Of total	±
Republican Party	William J. Howell	66	66%	66 / 100	▼1	798,868	60.79%	
Democratic Party	David Toscano	34	34%	34 / 100	▲1	451,865	34.38%	
Other parties
Independent / Other	N/A	0	0%	0 / 100	Steady	47,574	3.62%	
Independent Green Party	N/A	0	0%	0 / 100	Steady	8,576	0.65%	
Libertarian Party	N/A	0	0%	0 / 100	Steady	4,996	0.38%	
Green Party	N/A	0	0%	0 / 100	Steady	2,367	0.18%	

Vote share
Republican	60.79%
Democratic	34.38%
Others	4.83%

House of Delegates seats
Republican	66%
Democratic	34%

=== By district ===
District	Incumbent			This race	
Number	Delegate	Party	First elected	Winner	Candidates
1	Terry Kilgore	Republican	1993	Terry Kilgore (R)	Terry Kilgore (R) unopposed
2	Michael Futrell	Democratic	2013	Mark Dudenhefer (D); Republican gain.	Mark Dudenhefer (R) 50.4% Joshua King (D) 49.4%
3	Will Morefield	Republican	2009	Will Morefield (R)	Will Morefield (R) unopposed
4	Todd Pillion	Republican	2014	Todd Pillion (R)	Todd Pillion (R) unopposed
5	Israel O'Quinn	Republican	2011	Israel O'Quinn (R)	Israel O'Quinn (R) unopposed
6	Jeff Campbell	Republican	2013	Jeff Campbell (R)	Jeff Campbell (R) unopposed
7	Nick Rush	Republican	2011	Nick Rush (R)	Nick Rush (R) unopposed
8	Greg Habeeb	Republican	2011	Greg Habeeb (R)	Greg Habeeb (R) unopposed
9	Charles Poindexter	Republican	2007	Charles Poindexter (R)	Charles Poindexter (R) unopposed
10	Randy Minchew	Republican	2011	Randy Minchew (R)	Randy Minchew (R) 62.0% Peter Rush (D) 37.8%
11	Sam Rasoul	Democratic	2014	Sam Rasoul (D)	Sam Rasoul (D) unopposed
12	Joseph R. Yost	Republican	2011	Joseph R. Yost (R)	Joseph R. Yost (R) 58.3% Laurie Buchwald (D) 41.6%
13	Bob Marshall	Republican	1991	Bob Marshall (R)	Bob Marshall (R) 56.1% Don Shaw (D) 43.7%
14	Danny Marshall	Republican	2001	Danny Marshall (R)	Danny Marshall (R) unopposed
15	Todd Gilbert	Republican	2005	Todd Gilbert (R)	Todd Gilbert (R) unopposed
16	Les Adams	Republican	2013	Les Adams (R)	Les Adams (R) unopposed
17	Chris Head	Republican	2011	Chris Head (R)	Chris Head (R) unopposed
18	Michael Webert	Republican	2011	Michael Webert (R)	Michael Webert (R) unopposed
19	Terry Austin	Republican	2013	Terry Austin (R)	Terry Austin (R) unopposed
20	Richard Bell	Republican	2009	Richard Bell (R)	Richard Bell (R) 75.2% Will Hammer (L) 23.9%
21	Ron Villanueva	Republican	2009	Ron Villanueva (R)	Ron Villanueva (R) 56.7% Susan Hippen (D) 43.0%
22	Kathy Byron	Republican	1997	Kathy Byron (R)	Kathy Byron (R) unopposed
23	Scott Garrett	Republican	2009	Scott Garrett (R)	Scott Garrett (R) unopposed
24	Benjamin L. Cline	Republican	2002	Benjamin L. Cline (R)	Benjamin L. Cline (R) 70.9% Ellen Arthur (D) 29.0%
25	Steve Landes	Republican	1995	Steve Landes (R)	Steve Landes (R) 66.2% Angela Lynn (D) 33.7%
26	Tony Wilt	Republican	2010	Tony Wilt (R)	Tony Wilt (R) unopposed
27	Roxann Robinson	Republican	2010	Roxann Robinson (R)	Roxann Robinson (R) 58.5% Marty Mooradian (D) 41.4%
28	Bill Howell	Republican	1987	Bill Howell (R)	Bill Howell (R) 60.3% Kandy Hilliard (D) 39.4%
29	Mark Berg	Republican	2013	Chris Collins (R); Republican hold.	Chris Collins (R) unopposed
30	Ed Scott	Republican	2003	Nicholas Freitas (R); Republican hold.	Nicholas Freitas (R) unopposed
31	Scott Lingamfelter	Republican	2001	Scott Lingamfelter (R)	Scott Lingamfelter (R) 53.4% Sara Townsend (D) 46.5%
32	Tag Greason	Republican	2009	Tag Greason (R)	Tag Greason (R) 53.1% Elizabeth Miller (D) 46.9%
33	Dave LaRock	Republican	2013	Dave LaRock (R)	Dave LaRock (R) 59.9% Chuck Hedges (D) 36.4% Mark Anderson (L) 3.6%
34	Kathleen Murphy	Democratic	2015	Kathleen Murphy (D)	Kathleen Murphy (D) 50.4% Craig Parisot (R) 49.5%
35	Mark Keam	Democratic	2009	Mark Keam (D)	Mark Keam (D) unopposed
36	Ken Plum	Democratic	1981 (1978–1980)	Ken Plum (D)	Ken Plum (D) unopposed
37	David Bulova	Democratic	2005	David Bulova (D)	David Bulova (D) 57.3% Sang Yi (R) 42.6%
38	Kaye Kory	Democratic	2009	Kaye Kory (D)	Kaye Kory (D) 73.8% James Leslie (G) 25.1%
39	Vivian Watts	Democratic	1995	Vivian Watts (D)	Vivian Watts (D) unopposed
40	Tim Hugo	Republican	2002	Tim Hugo (R)	Tim Hugo (R) 65.2% Jerry Foltz (D) 34.7%
41	Eileen Filler-Corn	Democratic	2010	Eileen Filler-Corn (D)	Eileen Filler-Corn (D) unopposed
42	Dave Albo	Republican	1993	Dave Albo (R)	Dave Albo (R) 63.4% Joana Garcia (D) 36.5%
43	Mark Sickles	Democratic	2003	Mark Sickles (D)	Mark Sickles (D) 63.3% Anna Urman (R) 33.4% Paul McIlvaine (I) 3.3%
44	Scott Surovell	Democratic	2009	Paul Krizek (D); Democratic hold.	Paul Krizek (D) unopposed
45	Rob Krupicka	Democratic	2012	Mark Levine (D); Democratic hold.	Mark Levine (D) unopposed
46	Charniele Herring	Democratic	2009	Charniele Herring (D)	Charniele Herring (D) 67.0% Sean Lenehan (R) 28.3% Andy Bakker (L) 4.5%
47	Patrick Hope	Democratic	2009	Patrick Hope (D)	Patrick Hope (D) 77.4% Janet Murphy (I) 21.8%
48	Rip Sullivan	Democratic	2014	Rip Sullivan (D)	Rip Sullivan (D) unopposed
49	Alfonso Lopez	Democratic	2011	Alfonso Lopez (D)	Alfonso Lopez (D) unopposed
50	Jackson Miller	Republican	2006	Jackson Miller (R)	Jackson Miller (R) 58.7% Kyle McCullough (D) 41.2%
51	Rich Anderson	Republican	2009	Rich Anderson (R)	Rich Anderson (R) unopposed
52	Luke Torian	Democratic	2009	Luke Torian (D)	Luke Torian (D) unopposed
53	Marcus Simon	Democratic	2013	Marcus Simon (D)	Marcus Simon (D) unopposed
54	Bobby Orrock	Republican	1989	Bobby Orrock (R)	Bobby Orrock (R) unopposed
55	Buddy Fowler	Republican	2013	Buddy Fowler (R)	Buddy Fowler (R) 60.3% Toni Radler (D) 39.5%
56	Peter Farrell	Republican	2011	Peter Farrell (R)	Peter Farrell (R) unopposed
57	David Toscano	Democratic	2005	David Toscano (D)	David Toscano (D) unopposed
58	Rob Bell	Republican	2001	Rob Bell (R)	Rob Bell (R) unopposed
59	Matt Fariss	Republican	2011	Matt Fariss (R)	Matt Fariss (R) unopposed
60	James E. Edmunds	Republican	2009	James E. Edmunds (R)	James E. Edmunds (R) unopposed
61	Tommy Wright	Republican	2000	Tommy Wright (R)	Tommy Wright (R) 71.3% Greg Marston (D) 28.6%
62	Riley Ingram	Republican	1991	Riley Ingram (R)	Riley Ingram (R) 59.5% Sheila Bynum-Coleman (D) 40.4%
63	Joseph E. Preston	Democratic	2015	Lashrecse Aird (D); Democratic hold.	Lashrecse Aird (D) unopposed
64	Rick Morris	Republican	2011	Rick Morris (R)	Rick Morris (R) unopposed
65	Lee Ware	Republican	1998	Lee Ware (R)	Lee Ware (R) unopposed
66	Kirk Cox	Republican	1989	Kirk Cox (R)	Kirk Cox (R) unopposed
67	James LeMunyon	Republican	2009	James LeMunyon (R)	James LeMunyon (R) unopposed
68	Manoli Loupassi	Republican	2007	Manoli Loupassi (R)	Manoli Loupassi (R) 61.3% Bill Grogan (D) 36.7% Michael Dickinson (I) 1.9%
69	Betsy B. Carr	Democratic	2009	Betsy B. Carr (D)	Betsy B. Carr (D) unopposed
70	Delores McQuinn	Democratic	2008	Delores McQuinn (D)	Delores McQuinn (D) unopposed
71	Jennifer McClellan	Democratic	2005	Jennifer McClellan (D)	Jennifer McClellan (D) 88.3% Steve Imholt (I) 11.1%
72	Jimmie Massie	Republican	2007	Jimmie Massie (R)	Jimmie Massie (R) unopposed
73	John O'Bannon	Republican	2000	John O'Bannon (R)	John O'Bannon (R) unopposed
74	Lamont Bagby	Democratic	2015	Lamont Bagby (D)	Lamont Bagby (D) 77.9% David Lambert (I) 21.1%
75	Roslyn Tyler	Democratic	2005	Roslyn Tyler (D)	Roslyn Tyler (D) unopposed
76	Chris Jones	Republican	1997	Chris Jones (R)	Chris Jones (R) unopposed
77	Lionell Spruill	Democratic	1993	Lionell Spruill (D)	Lionell Spruill (D) unopposed
78	Jay Leftwich	Republican	2013	Jay Leftwich (R)	Jay Leftwich (R) unopposed
79	Johnny Joannou	Democratic	1997 (1976–1984)	Steve Heretick (D); Democratic hold.	Steve Heretick (D) unopposed
80	Matthew James	Democratic	2009	Matthew James (D)	Matthew James (D) unopposed
81	Barry Knight	Republican	2008	Barry Knight (R)	Barry Knight (R) 69.1% Jeff Staples (G) 30.1%
82	Bill DeSteph	Republican	2013	Jason Miyares (R); Republican hold.	Jason Miyares (R) 65.2% Bill Fleming (D) 34.6%
83	Chris Stolle	Republican	2009	Chris Stolle (R)	Chris Stolle (R) unopposed
84	Glenn Davis	Republican	2013	Glenn Davis (R)	Veronica Coleman (D) unopposed
85	Scott Taylor	Republican	2013	Scott Taylor (R)	Scott Taylor (R) unopposed
86	Tom Rust	Republican	2001	Jennifer Boysko (D); Democratic gain.	Jennifer Boysko (D) 54.5% Danny Vargas (R) 42.0% Paul Brubaker (I) 3.5%
87	David Ramadan	Republican	2011	John Bell (D); Democratic gain.	John Bell (D) 49.9% Chuong Nguyen (R) 47.9% Brian Suojanen (L) 2.1%
88	Mark Cole	Republican	2001	Mark Cole (R)	Mark Cole (R) unopposed
89	Daun Hester	Democratic	2012	Daun Hester (D)	Daun Hester (D) unopposed
90	Joe Lindsey	Democratic	2014	Joe Lindsey (D)	Joe Lindsey (D) unopposed
91	Gordon Helsel	Republican	2011	Gordon Helsel (R)	Gordon Helsel (R) unopposed
92	Jeion Ward	Democratic	2003	Jeion Ward (D)	Jeion Ward (D) unopposed
93	Monty Mason	Democratic	2013	Monty Mason (D)	Monty Mason (D) 54.7% Lara Overy (R) 45.2%
94	David Yancey	Republican	2011	David Yancey (R)	David Yancey (R) 57.4% Shelly Simonds (D) 42.3%
95	Mamye BaCote	Democratic	2003	Marcia Price (D); Democratic hold.	Marcia Price (D) 75.8% Priscilla Burnett (G) 22.9%
96	Brenda Pogge	Republican	2007	Brenda Pogge (R)	Brenda Pogge (R) 61.1% Brandon Waltrip (I) 38.7%
97	Chris Peace	Republican	2006	Chris Peace (R)	Chris Peace (R) 78.5% Erica Lawler (G) 21.1%
98	Keith Hodges	Republican	2011	Keith Hodges (R)	Keith Hodges (R) unopposed
99	Margaret Ransone	Republican	2011	Margaret Ransone (R)	Margaret Ransone (R) unopposed
100	Robert Bloxom Jr.	Republican	2014	Robert Bloxom Jr. (R)	Robert Bloxom Jr. (R) 57.9% Willie Randall (D) 42.0%

=== Seats that changed hands ===
Democratic to Republican (1)

- 2nd district

Republican to Democratic (2)

- 86th district
- 87th district

== Aftermath ==
=== Reaction ===
FairVote criticized the election results as demonstrative of Republican gerrymandering and the failures of winner-take-all voting. Stephen J. Farnsworth, a University of Mary Washington described the election in The Washington Post as a "tribute to gerrymandering," highlighting the lack of competitive races. The Democratic Party of Virginia framed "Democratic gains" in the House as having successfully "bucked the national trend as both a Southern state and presidential battleground state."

== See also ==
- 2015 United States elections
- 2015 Virginia elections
  - 2015 Virginia Senate election
