= Raul Danny Vargas =

American businessman

Raul "Danny" Vargas
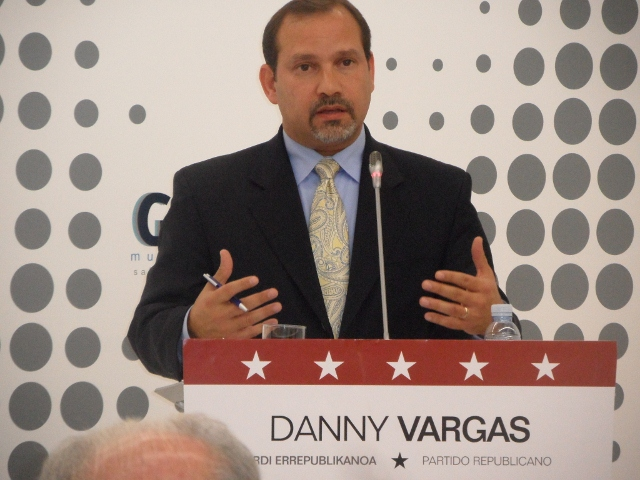
- A photograph of Raul Danny Vargas, October 2012
- Born: New York City, U.S.
- Occupation: Businessman

Raul "Danny" Vargas is an American businessman, media personality, U.S. Air Force veteran and political activist. He is founder and president of VARCom Solutions, a D.C. area-based marketing and public relations firm and is the Founder/Chairman/CEO of the American Latino Veterans Association (ALVA), a national non-profit focused on helping Latino veterans thrive and recognizing their indispensable contributions. He is the Chairman Emeritus of the Friends of the National Museum of the American Latino. He was the National Chairman of the Republican National Hispanic Assembly from 2007 - 2009. Vargas unsuccessfully ran as a Republican in Virginia's 86th House of Delegates district in the 2015 Virginia House of Delegates election, losing to Democrat Jennifer Boysko.

== Early life ==
Danny Vargas was born in New York City, New York and grew up in Brooklyn, New York. His parents were from Puerto Rico. By the age of two, his parents had divorced, leaving his mother to raise him and his three older sisters as a single parent. His mother was a poorly educated woman who grew up in Arecibo, Puerto Rico in indentured servitude, never finished the first grade and never learned to read or write. Finding herself with no means of support and ill-prepared for raising children by herself, the family ended up on welfare.

To his good fortune, his isolation caused him to be very focused on his academics as an escape. His excellent grades caused him to be selected as valedictorian at his junior high school graduation. He helped raise his infant niece that was born to the sister closest to him in age. He graduated with honors from the New York State Board of Regents. He decided to join the US Air Force after graduation and scored well enough on entrance exams to choose the career field he would follow.

== Professional career ==
He enlisted in the U.S. Air Force in November 1983 and entered the intelligence career field. After being stationed in Panama for nearly five years, he spent his final year on active duty stationed in San Antonio, Texas. After his honorable discharge he landed a job with a government contractor where he worked for five years. He was transferred to Northern Virginia in 1991 and he has lived there ever since. Eventually, he earned his degree by going to school at night and on weekends.

In 1995 he decided to enter the telecommunications industry. He worked for Sprint International which was later merged with France Telecom and Deutsche Telekom to create a joint venture called Global One. He worked in program management and later sales and marketing. After the joint venture was dissolved, he worked for France Telecom as the Vice President of Sales and Marketing for the Americas region for their wholesale division.

In 2004, he started his own business called VARCom Solutions, based in Herndon, Virginia. VARCom provides strategic marketing, communications and public relations services as well as training and business consulting. VARCom’s clients include government contractors, technology/telecom firms and financial institutions.

In 2006, he accepted an executive position with AOL while still operating VARCom Solutions. At AOL he served as the VP of Global Sales for Voice Services, and later as VP of Latin America.

In February 2011, the Washington Business Journal named Vargas one of its 2011 Minority Business Leaders and in May of the same year, the Small Business Administration recognized him as it Minority Business Champion for both the Washington, D.C. and Mid-Atlantic regions.

In April 2012, John Marshall Bank appointed Vargas to its Fairfax Regional Advisory Board.

== Civic engagement ==
Vargas is on the board of directors of the Fairfax County Chamber of Commerce and served a term on its executive committee. He was the Chairman of the Dulles Regional Chamber of Commerce from 2007 to 2008 (the first Hispanic to chair a mainstream chamber in the history of Virginia); National Chairman of the Republican National Hispanic Assembly from 2007 to 2009; member of the board of directors of Northern Virginia Family Service (a 501(c)(3) focused on empowering families); served on the board of the Fairfax Partnership for youth; he founded the Hispanic GovCon Network; and he regularly speaks to students at various levels to encourage them to stay in school and work hard to succeed.

He founded and chaired a Hispanic Advisory Group for then Congressman Frank Wolf and was actively engaged in efforts to reduce gang-related violence in the Herndon area as well as solutions to the day laborer and immigration issues.

In 2009, Vargas was appointed by Congress to serve on a bipartisan commission to study the creation of an American Latino Museum under the Smithsonian Institution. The commission delivered its report to Congress and President Obama in 2011.

In September 2010, Virginia Governor Bob McDonnell appointed Vargas to the Virginia Board of Workforce Development, which is a business-led board which provides strategic leadership to the state regarding the workforce development system. In 2013, Vargas was appointed Chairman of the Board and has since taken a national leadership role in the transformation of the workforce system into one that is employer-oriented and demand-driven.

His political viewpoints have been featured in the NBC Latino (where he was a featured contributor), MSNBC (where he is a regular commentator), Wall Street Journal and Politico.com.

He has been recognized by both the Virginia General Assembly and the United States Congress for his community efforts.
