= 2018 United States Senate election in Virginia =

- November 6, 2018
- Turnout: 59.14% ▼
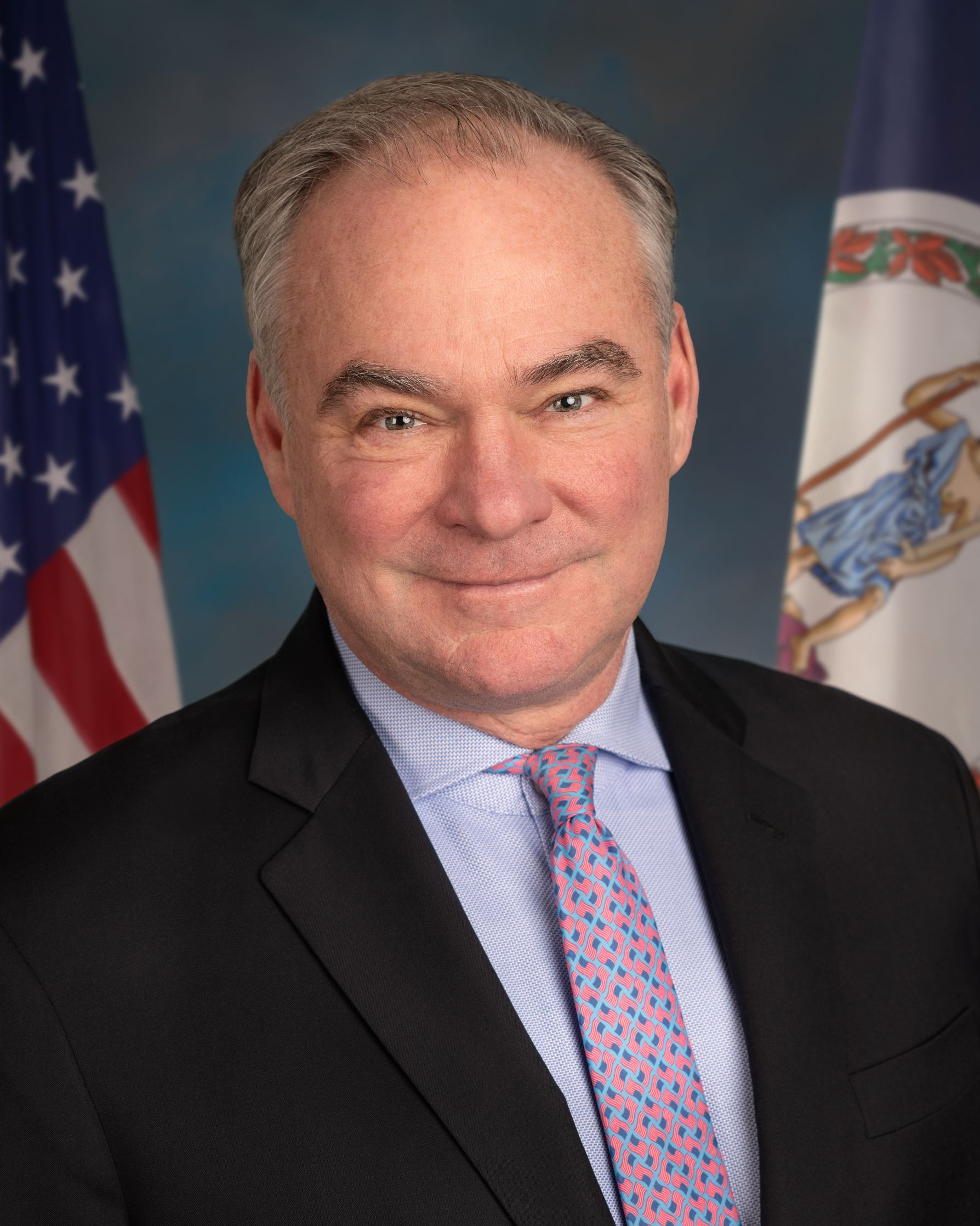

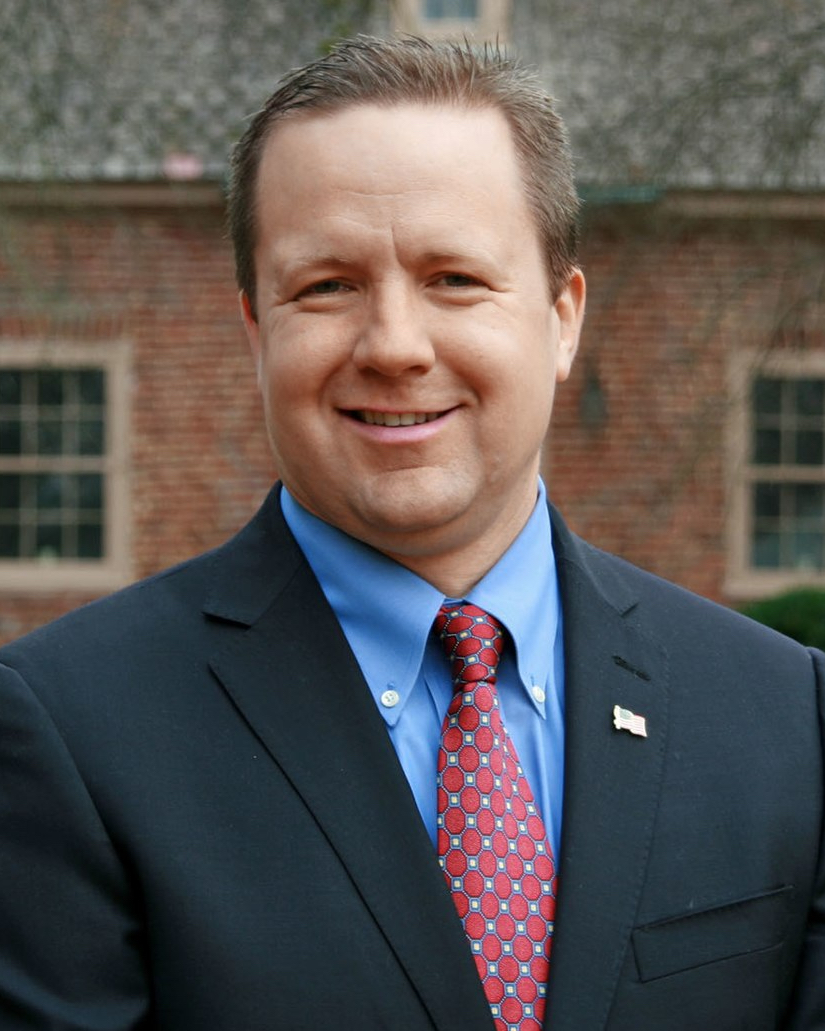
Nominee	Tim Kaine	Corey Stewart
Party	Democratic	Republican
Popular vote	1,910,370	1,374,313
Percentage	57.00%	41.00%
- Kaine: 40–50% 50–60% 60–70% 70–80% 80–90% >90% Stewart: 40–50% 50–60% 60–70% 70–80% 80–90%
U.S. senator before election
Tim Kaine
Democratic
Elected U.S. Senator
Tim Kaine
Democratic

The 2018 United States Senate election in Virginia took place on November 6, 2018, to elect a member of the United States Senate to represent the Commonwealth of Virginia, concurrently with other elections to the U.S. Senate, elections to the United States House of Representatives, and various state and local elections. Incumbent Democratic Senator Tim Kaine, who had been his party's unsuccessful nominee for vice president two years earlier, was re-elected to a second term in office, winning this seat by the largest margin since 1988. This was the first election since 1994 that anyone had been re-elected to this seat.

The Republican Party of Virginia central committee voted to select the Republican nominee for Senate by a primary rather than a convention. Corey Stewart, chair of the Prince William Board of County Supervisors, won the Republican nomination on June 12, 2018, after defeating Delegate Nick Freitas and Christian minister E. W. Jackson.

== Democratic primary ==
=== Candidates ===
==== Nominee ====
- Tim Kaine, incumbent U.S. senator, former governor, and Democratic nominee for vice president in 2016

== Republican primary ==
=== Candidates ===
==== Nominee ====
- Corey Stewart, chairman of the Prince William Board of County Supervisors, candidate for lieutenant governor in 2013 and candidate for governor in 2017

==== Eliminated in primary ====
- Nick Freitas, state delegate
- E. W. Jackson, pastor, attorney, veteran, candidate for the U.S. Senate in 2012 and nominee for lieutenant governor in 2013

==== Failed to qualify ====
- Minerva Diaz, veteran, businesswoman, and Christian minister
- Bert Mizusawa, former Deputy Undersecretary of the Army, retired U.S. Army major general, and candidate for VA-02 in 2010
- Ivan Raiklin, veteran and businessman

==== Declined ====
- Dave Brat, U.S. representative
- Eric Cantor, former Majority Leader of the United States House of Representatives
- Barbara Comstock, U.S. representative
- Ken Cuccinelli, former attorney general and nominee for governor in 2013
- Tom Davis, former U.S. representative
- Carly Fiorina, former CEO of Hewlett-Packard, nominee for the U.S. Senate from California in 2010 and candidate for president in 2016
- Ed Gillespie, former chairman of the Republican National Committee, nominee for the U.S. Senate in 2014, and nominee for governor in 2017
- Jim Gilmore, former governor, nominee for the U.S. Senate in 2008 and candidate for president in 2008 and 2016
- Shak Hill, candidate for the U.S. Senate in 2014 (running for VA-10)
- Laura Ingraham, talk radio host, author, and conservative political commentator (endorsed Corey Stewart)
- Jimmie Massie, former state delegate
- Bob McDonnell, former governor of Virginia (endorsed Nick Freitas)
- John Moore, University of Virginia law professor and former diplomat
- Pete Snyder, technology entrepreneur and candidate for lieutenant governor in 2013
- Scott Taylor, U.S. representative
- Frank Wagner, state senator and candidate for governor in 2017
- Rob Wittman, U.S. representative

=== Endorsements ===
Nick Freitas

U.S. senators

- Mike Lee (R-UT)
- Rand Paul (R-KY), and 2016 U.S. presidential candidate

U.S. representatives

- Paul Broun, former U.S. representative (R-GA)
- Ron Paul, former U.S. representative (R-TX), candidate for president in 1988, 2008 and 2012

U.S. governors

- Bob McDonnell (R-VA), former governor of Virginia

State senators

- Bill DeSteph, state senator
- Mark Obenshain, state senator and 2013 Republican nominee for Attorney General of Virginia
- Bryce Reeves, state senator and candidate for lieutenant governor in 2017
- David Suetterlein, state senator

State delegates

- Rob Bell, state delegate and candidate for Attorney General of Virginia in 2013 and 2017.
- Todd Gilbert, Virginia House Majority Leader
- Greg Habeeb, state delegate
- Steve Landes, state delegate
- Dave LaRock, state delegate
- Jason Miyares, state delegate
- Brenda Pogge, state delegate
- Mike Webert, state delegate

Local officials

- Susan Lascolette, member of the Goochland County Board of Supervisors
- Jeremy McCleary, mayor of Woodstock
- Ron Meyer, Loudoun County Supervisor
- Andrew Pullen, member of the Fluvanna County School Board
- Jon Russell, member of the Culpeper town council
- Josh Thiel, Leesburg town councilmen

Individuals

- Hugh Hewitt, conservative talk radio host
- Kyle Kashuv, Parkland shooting survivor and conservative activist
- Charlie Kirk, founder and executive director of Turning Point USA
- Kelley Paul, political consultant and activist
- Austin Petersen, Libertarian candidate for President of the United States in 2016 and candidate for U.S Senate in Missouri for 2018
- Cabot Phillips, media director for Campus Reform
- Denver Riggleman, businessman, candidate for governor in 2017, and Republican nominee for VA-05 in 2018
- Richard Viguerie, conservative activist and chairman of ConservativeHQ.com

Party leaders

- Morton Blackwell, Republican National Committeeman for Virginia

Organizations

- Americans For Prosperity
- FreedomWorks
- National Association for Gun Rights PAC
- NRA Political Victory Fund
- Republican Liberty Caucus
- Students For Trump

Newspapers and other media

- 71 Republic
- Arlington Sun Gazette
- The Reagan Battalion
E. W. Jackson

Cabinet-level officials

- William G. Boykin, executive vice president at the Family Research Council, retired lieutenant general, former Deputy Undersecretary of Defense for Intelligence
- Dr. Sebastian Gorka, former deputy assistant to President Donald Trump, military and intelligence analyst, FOX News contributor

U.S. governors

- Mike Huckabee, former governor of Arkansas

Statewide office holders

- Ken Blackwell, National Rifle Association of America board member, former Ohio Secretary of State, former Ohio State Treasurer, former mayor of Cincinnati, Ohio

Local officials

- Suzy Kelly, Chesapeake city councilwoman, chairman of the Virginia Chamber of Commerce, CEO of Jo-Kell

Individuals

- Rafael Cruz, pastor and father of Ted Cruz

Organizations

- Family Research Council Action PAC

=== Polling ===
Poll source	Date(s) administered	Sample size	Margin of error	Nick Freitas	E. W. Jackson	Corey Stewart	Other	Undecided
Atlantic Media & Research (R-Stewart)	May 14–18, 2018	355	± 5.2%	9%	5%	32%	–	–
Christopher Newport University	February 5–28, 2018	422	± 2.5%	6%	7%	16%	5%	66%

Hypothetical polling

Poll source	Date(s) administered	Sample size	Margin of error	Dave Brat	Corey Stewart	Scott Taylor	Other	Undecided
University of Mary Washington	September 5–12, 2017	562 LV	± 5.2%	11%	15%	20%	12%	38%
University of Mary Washington	September 5–12, 2017	867 RV	± 4.1%	9%	12%	20%	9%	45%

=== Results ===
Results by county and independent city: Stewart—70–80% Stewart—60–70% Stewart—50–60% Stewart—40–50% Stewart—<40% Tie Freitas—<40% Freitas—40–50% Freitas—50–60% Freitas—60–70% Freitas—70–80%

Republican primary results
Party	Candidate	Votes	%
Republican	Corey Stewart	136,610	44.87%
Republican	Nick Freitas	131,321	43.14%
Republican	Earl Jackson, Sr.	36,508	11.99%
Total votes		304,439	100.00%

== Third party candidates ==
- Winsome Sears, a Republican former state delegate, ran as a write-in candidate.
- Matt Waters, director of development at Students For Liberty, received the Libertarian Party nomination on March 10, 2018. On June 28, 2018, he also received the endorsement of the Constitution Party of Virginia.

== General election ==
The election featured a match-up of two Minnesota-born Virginians: Republican Corey Stewart was born in Duluth, Minnesota, and Democrat Tim Kaine was born in Saint Paul, Minnesota. All polls leading up to the election showed Kaine defeating Stewart by a wide margin. When polls closed on election day, Tim Kaine was immediately declared the winner before the votes were counted, based on exit polling alone.

=== Predictions ===
Source	Ranking	As of
The Cook Political Report	Safe D	October 26, 2018
Inside Elections	Safe D	November 1, 2018
Sabato's Crystal Ball	Safe D	November 5, 2018
Fox News	Likely D	July 9, 2018
CNN	Safe D	July 12, 2018
RealClearPolitics	Safe D	August 14, 2018

=== Debates/townhalls ===
Host network/sponsors	Date	Link(s)	Participants		
Host network/sponsors	Date	Link(s)	Tim Kaine (D)	Corey Stewart (R)	Matt Waters (L)
PBS NewsHour/Virginia Bar Association	July 21, 2018		Invited	Invited	—
Hampton University/Liberty University	September 20, 2018		Invited	Invited	—
WRC-TV	September 26, 2018		Invited	Invited	—
Liberty University	October 3, 2018		Invited	Invited	—

=== Endorsements ===
Corey Stewart (R)

U.S. executive branch officials

- Donald Trump, president of the United States

U.S. representatives

- Virgil Goode (VA-5) (former)

State officials

- Ken Cuccinelli, former Attorney General of Virginia
- E.W. Jackson, former Republican nominee for lieutenant governor of Virginia

Individuals

- Maria Espinoza, founder of the Remembrance Project
- Jerry Falwell Jr., president of Liberty University
- Laura Ingraham, talk radio host, author, and conservative political commentator
- Malik Obama, half-brother of former president Barack Obama
Tim Kaine (D)

U.S. executive branch officials

- Barack Obama, 44th president of the United States

U.S. senators

- Dick Durbin, U.S. senator (D-IL) and Senate Minority Whip
- Doug Jones, U.S. senator (D-AL)
- John Warner, former U.S. senator (R-VA)
- Mark Warner, U.S. senator (D-VA)

U.S. representatives

- Don Beyer (D-VA-8)
- Gerry Connolly (D-VA-11)
- Donald McEachin (D-VA-4)
- Tom Perriello (D-VA-5) (former)

State officials

- Justin Fairfax, lieutenant governor of Virginia
- Terry McAuliffe, former governor of Virginia
- Ralph Northam, governor of Virginia

Labor unions

- United Automobile Workers
- United Mine Workers of America

Organizations

- Coalition to Stop Gun Violence
- Council for a Livable World
- Feminist Majority Political Action Committee
- JStreet
- League of Conservation Voters Action Fund
- National Committee to Preserve Social Security and Medicare
- National Organization for Women
- Natural Resources Defense Council Action Fund
- Population Connection
- Sierra Club Virginia Chapter
Matt Waters (L)

Local officials

- Joe Walton, Libertarian nominee for VA-07 in 2018 and former chairman of the Powhatan County Board of Supervisors

Party leaders

- Wes Benedict, executive director of the Libertarian National Committee
- Carla Howell, political director of the Libertarian Party
- Bill Redpath, Libertarian National Committeeman, former treasurer and former chairman of the Libertarian National Committee
- Nicholas Sarwark, chairman of the Libertarian National Committee, candidate for Mayor of Phoenix in 2018

Individuals

- Cliff Hyra, lawyer and Libertarian nominee for governor of Virginia in 2017
- Daniel McAdams, executive director of the Ron Paul Institute for Peace and Prosperity
- Dan McLaughlin, lawyer and columnist at National Review
- Chris Rufer, founder of The Morning Star Company
- Jon Utley, publisher of The American Conservative and son of Freda Utley

Organizations

- Constitution Party of Virginia
- Libertarian Youth Caucus

=== Polling ===
Poll source	Date(s) administered	Sample size	Margin of error	Tim Kaine (D)	Corey Stewart (R)	Matt Waters (L)	Other	Undecided
University of Mary Washington/SSRS	September 4–9, 2018	512 LV	± 5.8%	52%	36%	5%	0%	4%
University of Mary Washington/SSRS	September 4–9, 2018	704 RV	± 5.0%	51%	33%	5%	1%	7%
University of Mary Washington/SSRS	September 4–9, 2018	801 A	± 4.6%	49%	30%	6%	1%	9%
Cygnal/POOLHOUSE (R)	August 22–24, 2018	1,119	± 2.8%	50%	46%	–	–	4%
Roanoke College	August 12–19, 2018	512	± 4.3%	51%	34%	4%	–	11%
Virginia Commonwealth University	July 10–30, 2018	757	± 3.6%	49%	26%	5%	–	20%
Quinnipiac University	June 21–25, 2018	1,082	± 3.7%	54%	36%	–	0%	9%
Roanoke College	May 20–30, 2018	555	± 4.2%	44%	33%	–	–	23%
Christopher Newport University	February 5–28, 2018	1,562	± 2.5%	56%	32%	–	1%	11%
University of Mary Washington/PSRAI	September 5–12, 2017	562 LV	± 5.2%	53%	36%	–	–	7%
University of Mary Washington/PSRAI	September 5–12, 2017	867 RV	± 4.1%	54%	39%	–	1%	4%

Hypothetical polling

with Nick Freitas

Poll source	Date(s) administered	Sample size	Margin of error	Tim Kaine (D)	Nick Freitas (R)	Other	Undecided
Roanoke College	May 20–30, 2018	555	± 4.2%	45%	30%	–	25%
Christopher Newport University	February 5–28, 2018	1,562	± 2.5%	56%	33%	1%	10%

with E. W. Jackson

Poll source	Date(s) administered	Sample size	Margin of error	Tim Kaine (D)	E. W. Jackson (R)	Other	Undecided
Roanoke College	May 20–30, 2018	555	± 4.2%	45%	30%	–	25%
Christopher Newport University	February 5–28, 2018	1,562	± 2.5%	56%	32%	1%	11%

with Dave Brat

Poll source	Date(s) administered	Sample size	Margin of error	Tim Kaine (D)	Dave Brat (R)	Undecided
University of Mary Washington	September 5–12, 2017	562 LV	± 5.2%	54%	36%	7%
University of Mary Washington	September 5–12, 2017	867 RV	± 4.1%	54%	41%	3%

with Barbara Comstock

Poll source	Date(s) administered	Sample size	Margin of error	Tim Kaine (D)	Barbara Comstock (R)	Undecided
Gravis Marketing	March 14–19, 2017	3,097	± 1.6%	53%	41%	6%

with Carly Fiorina

Poll source	Date(s) administered	Sample size	Margin of error	Tim Kaine (D)	Carly Fiorina (R)	Other	Undecided
Quinnipiac University	April 6–10, 2017	1,115	± 2.9%	57%	33%	–	7%
Gravis Marketing	March 14–19, 2017	3,097	± 1.6%	53%	41%	–	7%
Quinnipiac University	February 10–15, 2017	989	± 3.1%	57%	36%	2%	5%

with Laura Ingraham

Poll source	Date(s) administered	Sample size	Margin of error	Tim Kaine (D)	Laura Ingraham (R)	Other	Undecided
Quinnipiac University	April 6–10, 2017	1,115	± 2.9%	56%	35%	–	7%
Quinnipiac University	February 10–15, 2017	989	± 3.1%	56%	36%	2%	7%

with Scott Taylor

Poll source	Date(s) administered	Sample size	Margin of error	Tim Kaine (D)	Scott Taylor (R)	Undecided
University of Mary Washington	September 5–12, 2017	562 LV	± 5.2%	52%	37%	7%
University of Mary Washington	September 5–12, 2017	867 RV	± 4.1%	53%	41%	4%

=== Results ===
Results by House of Delegates

Kaine won the election by a wide margin.

2018 United States Senate election in Virginia
Party	Candidate	Votes	%	±%
Democratic	Tim Kaine (incumbent)	1,910,370	57.00%	+4.17%
Republican	Corey Stewart	1,374,313	41.00%	−5.93%
Libertarian	Matt Waters	61,565	1.84%	N/A
Write-in		5,509	0.16%	–0.09%
Total votes		3,351,757	100.00%	N/A
Democratic hold				

==== By county and independent city ====
Locality	Tim Kaine Democratic		Corey Stewart Republican		Various candidates Other parties		Margin		Total
Locality	#	%	#	%	#	%	#	%	Total
Accomack	5,997	47.05%	6,605	51.82%	143	1.12%	-608	-4.77%	12,745
Albemarle	35,701	66.95%	16,371	30.70%	1,254	2.35%	19,330	36.25%	53,326
Alexandria	53,307	81.00%	10,734	16.31%	1,771	2.69%	42,573	64.69%	65,812
Alleghany	1,952	35.80%	3,433	62.96%	68	1.25%	-1,481	-27.16%	5,453
Amelia	1,938	33.13%	3,823	65.36%	88	1.50%	-1,885	-32.23%	5,849
Amherst	4,541	36.20%	7,779	62.01%	225	1.79%	-3,238	-25.81%	12,545
Appomattox	1,828	27.36%	4,751	71.11%	102	1.53%	-2,923	-43.75%	6,681
Arlington	87,258	81.62%	16,495	15.43%	3,160	2.96%	70,763	66.19%	106,913
Augusta	8,427	28.27%	20,796	69.77%	584	1.96%	-12,369	-41.50%	29,807
Bath	576	32.95%	1,142	65.33%	30	1.72%	-566	-32.38%	1,748
Bedford	9,632	27.10%	25,301	71.17%	615	1.73%	-15,669	-44.08%	35,548
Bland	504	20.55%	1,916	78.11%	33	1.35%	-1,412	-57.56%	2,453
Botetourt	4,543	29.27%	10,720	69.06%	259	1.67%	-6,177	-39.80%	15,522
Bristol	1,770	33.57%	3,427	65.00%	75	1.42%	-1,657	-31.43%	5,272
Brunswick	3,717	60.38%	2,394	38.89%	45	0.73%	1,323	21.49%	6,156
Buchanan	1,785	30.09%	4,095	69.02%	53	0.89%	-2,310	-38.93%	5,933
Buckingham	2,802	45.64%	3,249	52.92%	88	1.43%	-447	-7.28%	6,139
Buena Vista	666	37.97%	1,047	59.69%	41	2.34%	-381	-21.72%	1,754
Campbell	6,305	28.69%	15,239	69.33%	435	1.98%	-8,934	-40.65%	21,979
Caroline	5,838	51.42%	5,323	46.89%	192	1.69%	515	4.54%	11,353
Carroll	2,459	23.15%	8,042	75.72%	120	1.13%	-5,583	-52.57%	10,621
Charles City	2,131	63.86%	1,168	35.00%	38	1.14%	963	28.86%	3,337
Charlotte	1,871	39.65%	2,792	59.17%	56	1.19%	-921	-19.52%	4,719
Charlottesville	17,641	86.10%	2,346	11.45%	503	2.45%	15,295	74.65%	20,490
Chesapeake	49,506	54.55%	39,632	43.67%	1,614	1.78%	9,874	10.88%	90,752
Chesterfield	83,091	54.01%	67,835	44.09%	2,928	1.90%	15,256	9.92%	153,854
Clarke	3,210	44.67%	3,845	53.51%	131	1.82%	-635	-8.84%	7,186
Colonial Heights	2,105	32.81%	4,183	65.21%	127	1.98%	-2,078	-32.39%	6,415
Covington	785	44.20%	957	53.89%	34	1.91%	-172	-9.68%	1,776
Craig	544	24.81%	1,615	73.64%	34	1.55%	-1,071	-48.84%	2,193
Culpeper	8,093	41.71%	10,913	56.24%	398	2.05%	-2,820	-14.53%	19,404
Cumberland	1,849	44.09%	2,270	54.12%	75	1.79%	-421	-10.04%	4,194
Danville	9,418	62.31%	5,518	36.51%	179	1.18%	3,900	25.80%	15,115
Dickenson	1,524	34.06%	2,926	65.39%	25	0.56%	-1,402	-31.33%	4,475
Dinwiddie	4,865	46.00%	5,626	53.20%	85	0.80%	-761	-7.20%	10,576
Emporia	1,163	64.97%	608	33.97%	19	1.06%	555	31.01%	1,790
Essex	2,266	51.29%	2,115	47.87%	37	0.84%	151	3.42%	4,418
Fairfax City	7,330	69.22%	2,988	28.22%	271	2.56%	4,342	41.00%	10,589
Fairfax County	340,740	70.92%	129,095	26.87%	10,650	2.22%	211,645	44.05%	480,485
Falls Church	5,902	82.10%	1,112	15.47%	175	2.43%	4,790	66.63%	7,189
Fauquier	13,735	42.64%	17,801	55.26%	678	2.10%	-4,066	-12.62%	32,214
Floyd	2,480	36.76%	4,180	61.96%	86	1.27%	-1,700	-25.20%	6,746
Fluvanna	5,981	49.84%	5,793	48.27%	227	1.89%	188	1.57%	12,001
Franklin City	1,894	63.32%	1,065	35.61%	32	1.07%	829	27.72%	2,991
Franklin County	6,995	31.54%	14,849	66.94%	337	1.52%	-7,854	-35.41%	22,181
Frederick	12,885	37.66%	20,640	60.32%	692	2.02%	-7,755	-22.66%	34,217
Fredericksburg	6,621	68.19%	2,832	29.17%	257	2.65%	3,789	39.02%	9,710
Galax	620	33.88%	1,198	65.46%	12	0.66%	-578	-31.58%	1,830
Giles	2,036	30.67%	4,500	67.79%	102	1.54%	-2,464	-37.12%	6,638
Gloucester	5,529	35.36%	9,816	62.77%	292	1.87%	-4,287	-27.42%	15,637
Goochland	5,443	41.16%	7,472	56.50%	310	2.34%	-2,029	-15.34%	13,225
Grayson	1,412	24.63%	4,249	74.11%	72	1.26%	-2,837	-49.49%	5,733
Greene	3,183	39.15%	4,749	58.41%	198	2.44%	-1,566	-19.26%	8,130
Greensville	2,109	60.41%	1,363	39.04%	19	0.54%	746	21.37%	3,491
Halifax	5,869	42.88%	7,691	56.20%	126	0.92%	-1,822	-13.31%	13,686
Hampton	37,078	73.43%	12,696	25.14%	723	1.43%	24,382	48.28%	50,497
Hanover	20,228	37.64%	32,333	60.16%	1,183	2.20%	-12,105	-22.52%	53,744
Harrisonburg	9,234	67.28%	4,056	29.55%	434	3.16%	5,178	37.73%	13,724
Henrico	94,826	65.16%	47,786	32.83%	2,924	2.01%	47,040	32.32%	145,536
Henry	7,061	37.70%	11,471	61.25%	196	1.05%	-4,410	-23.55%	18,728
Highland	400	33.78%	772	65.20%	12	1.01%	-372	-31.42%	1,184
Hopewell	3,878	56.33%	2,894	42.04%	112	1.63%	984	14.29%	6,884
Isle of Wight	7,357	43.77%	9,171	54.56%	281	1.67%	-1,814	-10.79%	16,809
James City	20,146	51.89%	17,955	46.25%	722	1.86%	2,191	5.64%	38,823
King and Queen	1,318	44.32%	1,615	54.30%	41	1.38%	-297	-9.99%	2,974
King George	3,976	40.78%	5,546	56.88%	228	2.34%	-1,570	-16.10%	9,750
King William	2,675	35.58%	4,707	62.61%	136	1.81%	-2,032	-27.03%	7,518
Lancaster	2,683	47.02%	2,947	51.65%	76	1.33%	-264	-4.63%	5,706
Lee	1,671	24.50%	5,096	74.71%	54	0.79%	-3,425	-50.21%	6,821
Lexington	1,511	71.27%	569	26.84%	40	1.89%	942	44.43%	2,120
Loudoun	106,064	63.12%	58,369	34.74%	3,592	2.14%	47,695	28.39%	168,025
Louisa	6,384	41.38%	8,790	56.97%	254	1.65%	-2,406	-15.60%	15,428
Lunenburg	1,943	43.42%	2,480	55.42%	52	1.16%	-537	-12.00%	4,475
Lynchburg	13,582	50.59%	12,238	45.59%	1,025	3.82%	1,344	5.01%	26,845
Madison	2,273	37.70%	3,655	60.62%	101	1.68%	-1,382	-22.92%	6,029
Manassas	8,130	62.88%	4,496	34.77%	303	2.34%	3,634	28.11%	12,929
Manassas Park	3,032	69.14%	1,260	28.73%	93	2.12%	1,772	40.41%	4,385
Martinsville	2,889	63.58%	1,566	34.46%	89	1.96%	1,323	29.12%	4,544
Mathews	1,566	35.46%	2,791	63.20%	59	1.34%	-1,225	-27.74%	4,416
Mecklenburg	5,149	43.62%	6,533	55.34%	123	1.04%	-1,384	-11.72%	11,805
Middlesex	2,031	39.59%	3,014	58.75%	85	1.66%	-983	-19.16%	5,130
Montgomery	20,109	56.63%	14,382	40.50%	1,017	2.86%	5,727	16.13%	35,508
Nelson	3,808	51.61%	3,417	46.31%	153	2.07%	391	5.30%	7,378
New Kent	3,736	34.97%	6,774	63.41%	173	1.62%	-3,038	-28.44%	10,683
Newport News	39,398	67.54%	17,891	30.67%	1,042	1.79%	21,507	36.87%	58,331
Norfolk	50,565	74.91%	15,603	23.11%	1,337	1.98%	34,962	51.79%	67,505
Northampton	2,924	57.15%	2,124	41.52%	68	1.33%	800	15.64%	5,116
Northumberland	2,631	41.97%	3,567	56.90%	71	1.13%	-936	-14.93%	6,269
Norton	408	37.12%	672	61.15%	19	1.73%	-264	-24.02%	1,099
Nottoway	2,466	46.48%	2,775	52.31%	64	1.21%	-309	-5.82%	5,305
Orange	6,148	41.12%	8,577	57.36%	227	1.52%	-2,429	-16.25%	14,952
Page	2,356	28.40%	5,825	70.22%	114	1.37%	-3,469	-41.82%	8,295
Patrick	1,633	24.41%	4,999	74.73%	57	0.85%	-3,366	-50.32%	6,689
Petersburg	9,170	89.52%	989	9.66%	84	0.82%	8,181	79.87%	10,243
Pittsylvania	8,105	32.03%	16,923	66.87%	278	1.10%	-8,818	-34.85%	25,306
Poquoson	1,737	28.97%	4,105	68.47%	153	2.55%	-2,368	-39.50%	5,995
Portsmouth	23,985	72.31%	8,601	25.93%	584	1.76%	15,384	46.38%	33,170
Powhatan	4,384	29.28%	10,254	68.49%	334	2.23%	-5,870	-39.21%	14,972
Prince Edward	3,893	55.04%	3,064	43.32%	116	1.64%	829	11.72%	7,073
Prince George	5,475	43.34%	7,004	55.45%	153	1.21%	-1,529	-12.10%	12,632
Prince William	106,449	64.94%	54,040	32.97%	3,437	2.10%	52,409	31.97%	163,926
Pulaski	4,063	33.63%	7,835	64.85%	183	1.51%	-3,772	-31.22%	12,081
Radford	2,979	58.66%	1,958	38.56%	141	2.78%	1,021	20.11%	5,078
Rappahannock	1,845	47.51%	1,984	51.09%	54	1.39%	-139	-3.58%	3,883
Richmond City	75,485	84.56%	11,962	13.40%	1,826	2.05%	63,523	71.16%	89,273
Richmond County	1,191	41.08%	1,683	58.05%	25	0.86%	-492	-16.97%	2,899
Roanoke City	20,149	64.41%	10,509	33.59%	624	1.99%	9,640	30.82%	31,282
Roanoke County	17,012	40.54%	24,194	57.65%	760	1.81%	-7,182	-17.11%	41,966
Rockbridge	3,584	38.34%	5,622	60.13%	143	1.53%	-2,038	-21.80%	9,349
Rockingham	9,811	31.00%	21,151	66.84%	683	2.16%	-11,340	-35.84%	31,645
Russell	2,471	27.61%	6,379	71.27%	101	1.13%	-3,908	-43.66%	8,951
Salem	4,116	41.65%	5,571	56.37%	196	1.98%	-1,455	-14.72%	9,883
Scott	1,627	21.63%	5,824	77.43%	71	0.94%	-4,197	-55.80%	7,522
Shenandoah	5,362	32.53%	10,836	65.73%	287	1.74%	-5,474	-33.21%	16,485
Smyth	2,683	27.75%	6,864	71.00%	121	1.25%	-4,181	-43.25%	9,668
Southampton	3,047	43.60%	3,869	55.36%	73	1.04%	-822	-11.76%	6,989
Spotsylvania	24,554	47.24%	26,466	50.92%	954	1.84%	-1,912	-3.68%	51,974
Stafford	28,536	50.91%	26,368	47.04%	1,145	2.04%	2,168	3.87%	56,049
Staunton	5,417	56.43%	3,937	41.01%	245	2.55%	1,480	15.42%	9,599
Suffolk	21,397	60.63%	13,397	37.96%	498	1.41%	8,000	22.67%	35,292
Surry	1,997	57.43%	1,436	41.30%	44	1.27%	561	16.13%	3,477
Sussex	2,258	58.08%	1,598	41.10%	32	0.82%	660	16.98%	3,888
Tazewell	2,809	21.01%	10,428	77.99%	134	1.00%	-7,619	-56.98%	13,371
Virginia Beach	91,813	54.19%	73,575	43.42%	4,055	2.39%	18,238	10.76%	169,443
Warren	5,060	35.48%	8,875	62.23%	327	2.29%	-3,815	-26.75%	14,262
Washington	5,825	28.47%	14,350	70.15%	282	1.38%	-8,525	-41.67%	20,457
Waynesboro	3,849	49.87%	3,713	48.11%	156	2.02%	136	1.76%	7,718
Westmoreland	3,448	49.62%	3,421	49.23%	80	1.15%	27	0.39%	6,949
Williamsburg	4,530	73.06%	1,547	24.95%	123	1.98%	2,983	48.11%	6,200
Winchester	5,242	57.45%	3,657	40.08%	225	2.47%	1,585	17.37%	9,124
Wise	2,860	26.11%	7,991	72.94%	104	0.95%	-5,131	-46.84%	10,955
Wythe	2,879	26.87%	7,669	71.59%	165	1.54%	-4,790	-44.71%	10,713
York	13,634	46.96%	14,828	51.07%	572	1.97%	-1,194	-4.11%	29,034
Totals	1,910,370	57.00%	1,374,313	41.00%	67,074	2.00%	536,057	15.99%	3,351,757

==== Counties and independent cities that flipped from Democratic to Republican ====
- Buckingham (largest town: Dillwyn)
- Covington (independent city)

==== Counties and independent cities that flipped from Republican to Democratic ====
- Chesterfield (no municipalities)
- Fluvanna (largest city: Lake Monticello)
- James City (no municipalities)
- Lynchburg (independent city)
- Stafford (no municipalities)
- Waynesboro (independent city)

==== By congressional district ====
Kaine won seven of 11 congressional districts.

District	Kaine	Stewart	Representative
1st	48%	50%	Rob Wittman
2nd	54%	44%	Scott Taylor
2nd	54%	44%	Elaine Luria
3rd	70%	28%	Bobby Scott
4th	64%	34%	Donald McEachin
5th	48%	50%	Tom Garrett
5th	48%	50%	Denver Riggleman
6th	41%	56%	Bob Goodlatte
6th	41%	56%	Ben Cline
7th	52%	46%	Dave Brat
7th	52%	46%	Abigail Spanberger
8th	78%	19%	Don Beyer
9th	35%	64%	Morgan Griffith
10th	60%	38%	Barbara Comstock
10th	60%	38%	Jennifer Wexton
11th	73%	25%	Gerry Connolly
