= Jennifer Boysko =

American politician (born 1966)

Member of the Virginia Senate
- Incumbent
- Assumed office January 11, 2019
- Preceded by: Jennifer Wexton
- Constituency: 33rd district (2019–2024); 38th district (2024–present)

Member of the Virginia House of Delegates from the 86th district
- In office January 13, 2016 – January 11, 2019
- Preceded by: Tom Rust
- Succeeded by: Ibraheem Samirah

Personal details
- Born: Jennifer Barton; November 16, 1966 (age 59) Pine Bluff, Arkansas, U.S.
- Party: Democratic
- Spouse: Glenn Boysko
- Education: Hollins University (BA)
- Website: Campaign website

Jennifer Barton Boysko (born November 16, 1966) is an American politician from the Commonwealth of Virginia. She has served as a member of the Virginia Senate since 2019, when she won a special election to replace fellow-Democrat Jennifer Wexton, who was vacating the seat to serve in the United States House of Representatives. Boysko represented Virginia's 33rd Senate district until 2024, then began representing the 38th district from that year onward as a result of redistricting. District 38 includes parts of Fairfax County. Prior to entering the Virginia Senate, she represented the 86th district in the Virginia House of Delegates, which is located in Fairfax and Loudoun counties. She is a member of the Democratic Party.

== Early life and career ==
Boysko was reared in Alabama and Arkansas. In 1989, she graduated from Hollins University in Roanoke, Virginia, with a Bachelor of Arts in psychology. Since 1996, Boysko has been a resident of downtown Herndon, Virginia, where she and her husband, Glenn, have raised two daughters.

== Virginia House of Delegates ==
In 2013, Boysko was narrowly defeated for the House of Delegates 86th district seat, losing to the incumbent Republican Tom Rust 50.08 percent to 49.92 percent, a difference of 32 votes.

The 2015 election, held November 3, featured an open seat after Rust announced his retirement on February 25, 2015. For the primary election, held June 9, Boysko ran unopposed. For the general election, Boysko received 54 percent of the vote; Republican Danny Vargas—who ran unopposed in his primary—received 42 percent; and Independent Paul Brubaker received 5 percent. According to the Virginia Public Access Project, Vargas outspent Boysko $654,725 to $476,322. Brubaker spent $9,100.

In 2017, Boysko was re-elected 69%-31%.

== Virginia Senate ==
Following Jennifer Wexton's election to the U.S. House of Representatives in the 2018 elections, Boysko announced her candidacy for the special election to succeed her in the Virginia Senate. She won the Democratic Party's nomination on November 17, and won against former Republican Delegate Joe T. May in the election on January 8, 2019.

Boysko was elected to a full term during the 2019 general election, defeating Leesburg Vice Mayor Suzanne Fox 65%-35%.

== Policy positions ==
=== Animal welfare ===
In 2018, as a member of the House of Delegates, Boysko sponsored legislation that would require companies to avoid using animals while testing cosmetics or household cleaners.

=== Housing ===
In 2026, Boysko introduced a rent stabilization bill to allow localities to prevent landlords from increasing annual rent by over 3%.

=== Labor ===
Boysko introduced a paid family leave proposal during the 2020 session of the Virginia State Senate. The bill would provide up to 12 weeks of paid time off for family or medical leave. The leave would be paid for by an insurance fund administered by the state and funded by a 0.5% payroll tax contribution by both workers and employers. Workers eligible for leave would receive 80% of their wages for up to 12 weeks.

== Electoral history ==
Virginia House of Delegates district 86 Democratic primary results, 2013
Party	Candidate	Votes	%
Democratic	Jennifer Boysko	1,215	77.33
Democratic	Herb Kemp	368	22.67
Total votes		1,583	100.0

Virginia House of Delegates district 86 general election results, 2013
Party	Candidate	Votes	%
Republican	Tom Rust (incumbent)	10,410	50.01
Democratic	Jennifer Boysko	10,378	49.75
n/a	Write-ins	51	0.25
Total votes		20,775	100.0
Republican hold			

Virginia House of Delegates district 86 general election, 2015
Party	Candidate	Votes	%
Democratic	Jennifer Boysko	8,283	54.46
Republican	Danny Vargas	6,390	42.01
Independent	Paul Brubaker	526	3.46
n/a	Write-ins	11	0.07
Total votes		15,210	100.0
Democratic gain from Republican			

Virginia House of Delegates district 86 general election, 2017
Party	Candidate	Votes	%
Democratic	Jennifer Boysko	16,865	68.52
Republican	Linda Schulz	7,707	31.31
n/a	Write-ins	40	0.16
Total votes		24,612	100.0
Democratic hold			

2019 Virginia's 33rd Senate district special election results, 2019
Party	Candidate	Votes	%
Democratic	Jennifer Boysko	14,779	69.77
Republican	Joe T. May	6,377	30.10
n/a	Write-ins	27	0.13
Total votes		21,183	100.0
Democratic hold			

Virginia Senate district 33 Democratic primary results, 2019
Party	Candidate	Votes	%
Democratic	Jennifer Boysko	8,268	84.27
Democratic	Sharafat Hussain	1,540	15.70
n/a	Write-ins	3	0.03
Total votes		9,811	100.0

Virginia Senate district 33 general election, 2019
Party	Candidate	Votes	%
Democratic	Jennifer Boysko	34,517	64.89
Republican	Suzanne Fox	18,615	34.99
n/a	Write-ins	63	0.12
Total votes		53,195	100.0
Democratic hold			

Virginia's 38th Senate District, 2023 general election
Party	Candidate	Votes	%
Democratic	Jennifer Boysko (incumbent)	47,623	68.46%
Republican	Matthew Lang	21,742	31.25%
Write-in		200	0.29%
Total votes		69,565	100.00%
Democratic hold			

United States House of Representatives Democratic primary election: 10th District, 2024
Party	Candidate	Votes	%
Democratic	Suhas Subramanyam	13,504	30.4%
Democratic	Dan Helmer	11,784	26.6%
Democratic	Atif Qarni	4,768	10.7%
Democratic	Eileen Filler-Corn	4,131	9.3%
Democratic	Jennifer Boysko	4,016	9.0%
Democratic	David Reid	1,419	3.2%
Democratic	Michelle Maldonado	1,412	3.2%
Democratic	Adrian Pokharel	1,028	2.3%
Democratic	Krystle Kaul	982	2.2%
Democratic	Travis Nembhard	722	1.6%
Democratic	Marion Devoe	386	0.9%
Democratic	Mark Leighton	225	0.5%
Total votes		44,377	100.0%
