= Beverly Sherwood =

American politician (born 1947)

Member of the Virginia House of Delegates from the 29th district
- In office January 12, 1994 – January 8, 2014
- Preceded by: Alson H. Smith
- Succeeded by: Mark Berg

Personal details
- Born: May 29, 1947 (age 79) Ossining, New York, U.S.
- Party: Republican
- Spouse: Frank Vincent Sherwood
- Children: Alicia Willis
- Occupation: Farmer
- Committees: Agriculture, Chesapeake and Natural Resources (chair); Appropriations; Militia, Police and Public Safety; Rules

Beverly Jean Sherwood (born May 29, 1947) was an American politician. She has served in the Virginia House of Delegates since 1994, representing the 29th district in the Shenandoah Valley, including the city of Winchester and parts of Frederick and Warren Counties. She is a member of the Republican Party.

Sherwood served on the Frederick County Board of Supervisors 1991–1993, before her election to the House to replace retiring Democrat Alson H. Smith.

Sherwood was chair of the House committee on Militia, Police and Public Safety 2002–2012. Since 2012, she has chaired the committee on Agriculture, Chesapeake and Natural Resources.

On June 11, 2013, Mark Berg defeated Sherwood in a Republican primary.

== Electoral history ==
Date	Election	Candidate	Party	Votes	%
Virginia House of Delegates, 29th district
November 2, 1993	General	Beverly Jean Sherwood	Republican	10,259	61.79
November 2, 1993	General	Raymond C. Sandy	Democratic	6,340	38.19
November 2, 1993	General	Write Ins		3	0.02
November 2, 1993	General	Alson H. Smith retired; seat switched from Democratic to Republican			
November 7, 1995	General	B J Sherwood	Republican	11,379	67.76
November 7, 1995	General	R G Dick	Democratic	5,414	32.24
November 7, 1995	General	Write Ins		1	0.01
November 4, 1997	General	Beverly J. Sherwood	Republican	14,826	99.95
November 4, 1997	General	Write Ins		11	0.05
November 2, 1999	General	B J Sherwood	Republican	8,660	99.83
November 2, 1999	General	Write Ins		15	0.17
November 6, 2001	General	B J Sherwood	Republican	13,897	77.55
November 6, 2001	General	P D Blaker		4,018	22.42
November 6, 2001	General	Write Ins		5	0.03
November 4, 2003	General	B J Sherwood	Republican	12,471	99.25
November 4, 2003	General	Write Ins		94	0.75
November 8, 2005	General	Beverly J. Sherwood	Republican	16,089	98.49
November 8, 2005	General	Write Ins		246	1.51
November 6, 2007	General	Beverly J. Sherwood	Republican	13,664	98.12
November 6, 2007	General	Write Ins		261	1.87
November 3, 2009	General	Beverly J. Sherwood	Republican	14,908	80.02
November 3, 2009	General	Aaron N. Tweedie		3,677	19.73
November 3, 2009	General	Write Ins		44	0.23
November 8, 2011	General	Beverly J. Sherwood	Republican	9,662	98.04
November 8, 2011	General	Write Ins		193	1.95
June 11, 2013	Republican primary	Mark J. Berg		1,573	51.32
June 11, 2013	Republican primary	Beverly J. Sherwood		1,492	48.68
June 11, 2013	Republican primary	Incumbent lost primary			
