= Virginia's 30th House of Delegates district =

Virginia legislative district

Virginia's 30th State House of Delegates district
- District map from the 2023 election
Delegate
John McAuliff; D–The Plains
since January 14, 2026
- Demographics: 72% White; 5% Black; 11% Hispanic; 9% Asian; 4% Multiracial
- Population (2023) • Voting age: 85,827; 18
- Registered voters (2024): 68,134

Virginia's 30th House of Delegates district elects one of 100 seats in the Virginia House of Delegates, the lower house of the state's bicameral legislature. District 30 includes all of Orange County and Madison County and part of Culpeper County, Virginia. The district had been represented by Democrat John McAuliff since 2026. His predecessor was Republican Geary Higgins.

== District officeholders ==
Years	Delegate	Party	Electoral history
January 14, 2004 – January 13, 2016	Edward T. Scott	Republican	Retired
January 13, 2016 – January 10, 2024	Nick Freitas	Republican	Retired to run in Virginia's 62nd House of Delegates district
January 10, 2024 – January 14, 2026	Geary Higgins	Republican	First elected in 2023
January 14, 2026 – present	John McAuliff	Democratic	First elected in 2025

== Electoral history ==
Date	Election	Candidate	Party	Votes	%
Virginia House of Delegates, 30th district
Jun 10, 2003	Republican primary	E T Scott		3,215	53.04
Jun 10, 2003	Republican primary	S R Found		1,526	25.18
Jun 10, 2003	Republican primary	D W Rogers		1,320	21.78
Nov 4, 2003	General	E T Scott	Republican	10,261	86.22
Nov 4, 2003	General	W C Thompson		1,637	13.76
Nov 4, 2003	General	Write Ins		3	0.03
Nov 4, 2003	General	George Broman retired; seat stayed Republican			
Jun 14, 2005	Republican primary	E T Scott		3,979	64.88
Jun 14, 2005	Republican primary	R M Jarvis		2,154	35.12
Nov 8, 2005	General	E T Scott	Republican	16,025	99.65
Nov 8, 2005	General	Write Ins		56	0.35
Nov 6, 2007	General	Edward T. Scott	Republican	16,503	99.29
Nov 6, 2007	General	Write Ins		118	0.70
Nov 3, 2009	General	Edward T. Scott	Republican	15,959	75.49
Nov 3, 2009	General	Matt A. Carson		5,154	24.38
Nov 3, 2009	General	Write Ins		27	0.12
Nov 8, 2011	General	Edward T. Scott	Republican	14,914	98.91
Nov 8, 2011	General	Write Ins		163	1.08
Nov 7, 2023	General	Geary M. Higgins	Republican	20,741	53.1
Nov 7, 2023	General	Robert L. Banse Jr.	Democratic	18,238	46.7
Nov 7, 2023	General	Write Ins		66	0.17
Nov 4, 2025	General	John Chilton McAuliff Geary M. Higgins Write Ins	Democratic Republican	19,878 18,571 58	51.62% 48.23% .15%
