= Mark Berg =

American politician

Member of the Virginia House of Delegates from the 29th district
- In office January 8, 2014 – January 13, 2016
- Preceded by: Beverly Sherwood
- Succeeded by: Chris Collins

Personal details
- Party: Republican

Mark J. Berg is an American politician from Virginia.

A member of the Republican Party, he was a member of the Virginia House of Delegates for one term, representing the 29th district. In the 2013 elections, he defeated the incumbent Republican and then defeated the Independent opponent Larry Yates. A retired doctor, Berg is affiliated with the Tea Party movement. He was defeated in a primary challenge in the 2015 elections by attorney Chris Collins.
