= Republican National Hispanic Assembly =

American political organization

- Formation: 1967
- Founded: 1967, 1974
- Founder: Ben Fernandez; Manuel Lujan, Jr. Fernando Oaxaca; Francisco Vega; Martin Castillo
- Purpose: political advocacy
- Location: Washington, D.C., U.S.
- Origins: Republican National Committee
- Region served: United States, Puerto Rico, Virgin Islands, Guam
- National Chairman: Dr. Luis Figueroa
- Key people: Dr. Luis Figueroa; National Chairman Nelson Albino; National Vice Chairman Barbara Casanova; National Secretary; Angel Cepeda; National Treasurer; Paul Rodriguez; Deputy Treasurer Asst. National Secretary Vianca Rodriguez; National Communications Director Carolina Amesty; National Political Director
- Employees: 100+
- Website: https://rnha.org/

The Republican National Hispanic Assembly is an American political organization founded in 1967 which seeks to promote Hispanic-American issues and interests within the Republican Party, and the Party's interests and candidates within the Hispanic-American population. The group is partially an outgrowth of the Spanish Speaking Advisory Committee of the Republican National Committee, which itself was created as a response to successful efforts to attract Hispanic-American voters to the presidential candidacy of Richard Nixon.

== History ==
=== Founding ===
In 1967, an informal meeting was held in Washington, DC by thirteen Hispanic-American men. As one participant, Francisco Vega, later recalled: "... the meeting came about by word of mouth... we were from Florida, California, Texas, New Jersey, Michigan, and several other states...." The purpose of the gathering was to discuss how they could increase Hispanic political involvement. Although all of men intimated some kind of affiliation with the Democrats, none of them felt especially attached to any political party.

Having had their offers to organize some kind of Hispanic outreach rebuffed by both the Democratic and Republican Party's national offices, the dejected group returned to their hotel. Eventually, the gathering dwindled down to five: Ben Fernandez, Manuel Lujan, Fernando Oaxaca, Martin Castillo, and Vega. These last attendees continued to talk, bonded over their common World War II service and political ideologies, and, eventually, formed the Republican National Hispanic Council. Fernandez was selected as its first president. The next year, the name of the organization was changed to the Republican National Hispanic Assembly with Fernandez taking up the title of national chairman.

Without formal acknowledgment from the Republican Party, the group immediately began to organize chapters in their home and surrounding states. They also managed to raise more than $400,000 by the end of 1968 which they presented to astonished Party officials. Relations between the two political entities soon warmed considerably.

=== RNC affiliation ===
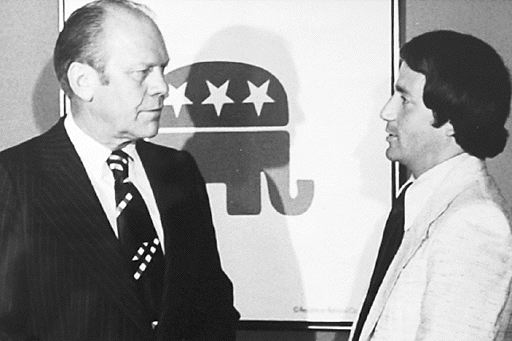
President Gerald Ford with Raul Espinoza, RNHA's first executive director, at the 1976 banquet

As part of its 1972 re-election campaign strategy, the Nixon Administration sought to increase Hispanic electoral participation. In addition to others, key RNHA personnel were tapped to assist in this endeavor and the Spanish Speaking Committee for the Re-Election of President Nixon was formed. This committee has been credited an integral role in garnering more than 35% of the Hispanic vote for the President- a vast improvement over the previous three election cycles where the Republican candidate averaged only 10%. Additionally, Fernandez and Vega occupied several important positions within Nixon's re-election campaign, in particular, the Hispanic Finance Committee. Chaired by Fernandez, the HFC raised over $250,000 for the President in 1972. Later that year, newly appointed RNC chairman George H. W. Bush began to lay the groundwork for a more permanent organization to woo and retain Hispanic voters.

In April 1973, Bush authorized the formation of the Spanish Speaking Advisory Committee; Castillo became its national chairman. In meetings held with the SSAC in Crystal City, Virginia, from July 11 to July 13, 1974, the RNHA was formally recognized and chartered by the RNC (it is also from this point that the RNHA dates its existence for organizational purposes). Since that time, it has been the only Hispanic Republican group officially affiliated with the national Republican Party.

The RNHA began increasing their public profile by holding Annual Banquets starting in 1976. President Gerald Ford delivered the keynote address at the first such event on July 29. At that time, Oaxaca was serving as an associate director in the Office of Management and Budget. A "Hispanic Heritage Leadership Breakfast" series was added in 1995.

=== Special occurrences ===
The RNHA ran into financial difficulties in 2007 due to declining membership concomitant with declining Hispanic numbers within the Republican Party. However, chairman Danny Vargas reported that new fundraising efforts were underway. Additionally, a new executive director, Bettina Inclan, was hired to revitalize the group's image.

Nevertheless, attempts at increasing Hispanic participation at the highest levels of the RNC were stymied in 2009. The leaders of several prominent Republican and Republican-leaning Hispanic organizations- including the RNHA- complained in a March 6 letter to RNC chairman Michael Steele of the situation. Despite assurances in a follow-up meeting, RNHA's Vargas and others would report that no movement had taken place as of a few months later.

Hispanic leaders also decried the state of Hispanics in the Party at a RNHA conference entitled "Future of Hispanics in the GOP." Citing the debate over- and the Party's stance on- immigration as the single most important issue driving away potential voters, Vargas stated: "We know that the party will not recover its majority until we get this right."

In 2015, the organization was on the brink of collapse. To prevent this from happening, the Vice Chairman of RNHA sought the help of Betty Cardenas. She was a prominent Hispanic contributor to the RNC and was well-respected within Republican circles. After being convinced to take on the role of Finance Chair, she accepted the responsibility in 2016.

On September 8, 2018, a National Convention was held in Las Vegas, Nevada. Representative Jenniffer González from Puerto Rico was the special speaker. Betty Cardenas was elected as the national chairwoman with unanimous support. Prior to this, she had served as the RNHA Finance Chair for a period of two years.

=== Recent developments ===
On July 14, 2020, the National Chairwoman informed the board that she would not seek reelection and would remain in her position until the national convention. However, the scheduled convention faced postponement multiple times due to the ongoing COVID-19 pandemic. On November 20, 2021, the former National Chairwoman, Betty Cardenas, tendered her resignation. Following her resignation, the appointment of a new National Chairman was necessary. Consequently, Ronnie Lucero, the New Mexico State Chairman, was unanimously elected as the new National Chairman. Article 2: Official RNHA Board Records

The National team worked diligently and in less than one year opened 2 new state chapters bringing the organization into 27 States, and 55 counties across the country. "Not only is RNHA focused on winning the election, RNHA is focused on helping people live the American Dream" said RNHA National Chairman Lucero at a recent Press and Media event held in Albuquerque, NM.

Following the resignation of the former Chairwoman Ronnie Lucero assumed leadership. He has since entrusted the organization to the capable leadership of the new Chairwoman, Elisa Slider, who is now guiding the organization in preparation for the upcoming election.

== Past Chairs ==
- 1967–1978 Benjamin Fernandez
- 1978–1983 Fernando Oaxaca
- 1983–1985 Dr. Tirso del Junco
- 1985–1987 Fernando C. de Baca
- 1987–1989 Catalina Vásquez Villalpando (resigned to assume the post of U.S. Treasurer)
- 1989–1989 Al Villalobos (acting- completed Villalpando's term)
- 1989–1993 Jose Manuel Casanova
- 1993–1995 Alicia Casanova
- 1995–1997 Antonio Monroig Malatrasi
- 1997–2001 Jose "Cheo" Rivera
- 2001–2005 Massey Villareal
- 2005–2007 Pedro Celis
- 2007–2009 Raul Danny Vargas - Businessman, Media Commentator, Political Activist
- 2009–2013 Alci Maldonado
- 2013–2017 Gonzalo J. Ferrer
- 2017–2018 Marlynn Burns
- 2018–2021 Betty Cardenas
- 2021–2023 Ronnie Lucero
- 2023–2026 Elisa Gomez
- 2026 - Present Dr. Luis Figueroa

== See also ==
- Hispanic and Latino Conservatism in the United States
- Republican National Committee
