= Betty Cardenas =

American political activist

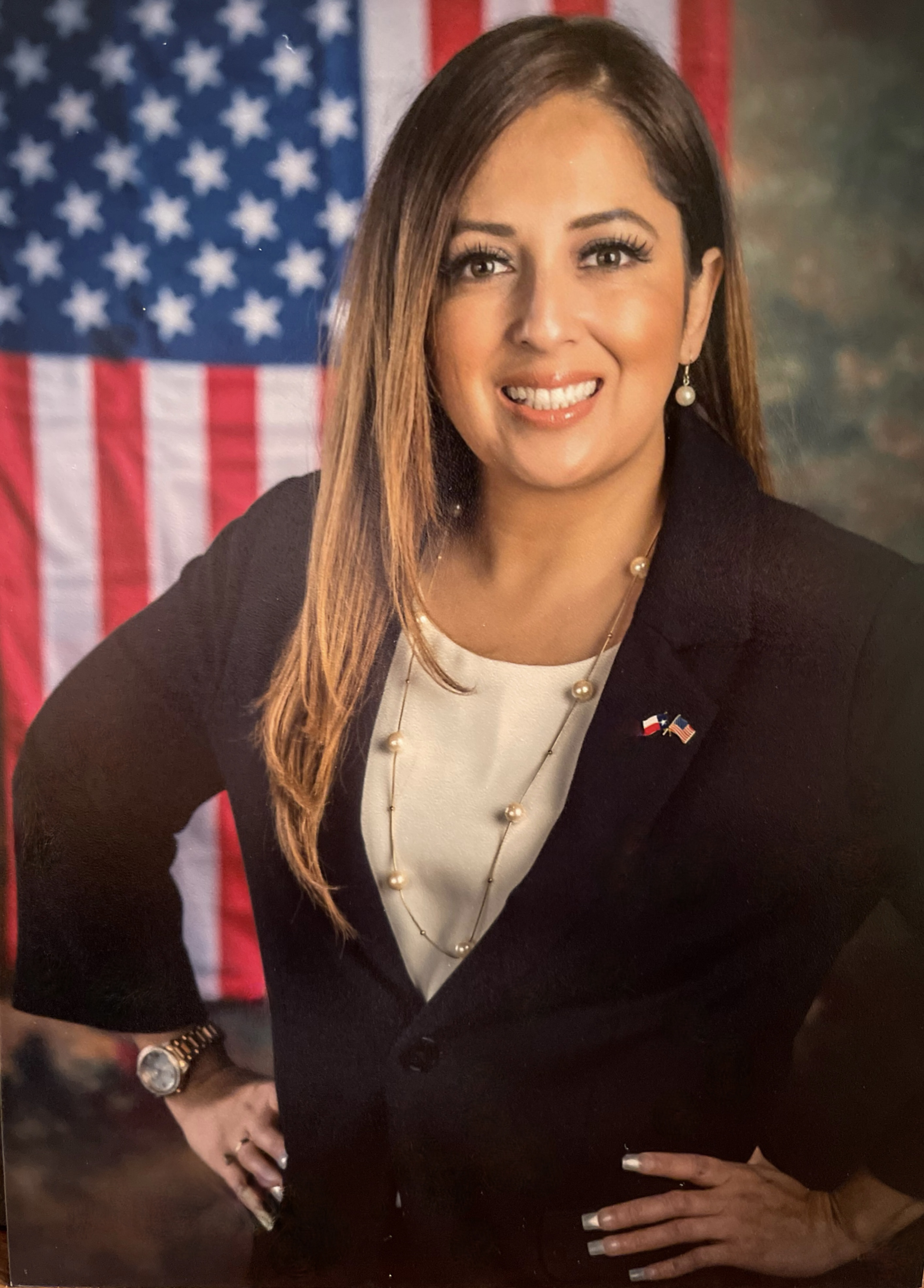

Personal details
- Education: Bachelor of Arts, political science and government with a minor in computer science (UNIVA)
- Occupation: Political advisor and business owner
- Website: www.bienvenido.us

Betty Cardenas is an American political advisor and entrepreneur. She served as the national chairwoman of the Republican National Hispanic Assembly (RNHA) from 2018 to 2021 during the first Trump administration.

== Education ==
Cardenas earned a Bachelor of Arts degree in political science and government and a minor in computer science from the Universidad del Valle de Atemajac..

== Career ==
In September 2018, during the Republican National Hispanic Assembly convention, Cardenas was elected national chairwoman by a unanimous vote. She had previously served as the RNHA's National Finance Chair. In 2019, she met with President Trump's campaign manager, Brad Parscale, and senior adviser, John Pence, to discuss a new outreach strategy for Hispanics, different from the Republican National Committee (RNC). She joined the board of Donald J. Trump's Latinos for Trump re-election campaign and served as an active advisor. She has also served on the board of several political campaigns and is a national partner of the American Latino Museum.

Cardenas also played a role in the Mayra Flores special election, which ran with a message of embracing Latino values. Mayra often credits Cardenas for taking her under the wing. Cardenas was the first Latina to own a firearm store and advocated for the Second Amendment. Cardenas has served as a member of the NRA's leadership for close to a decade. Additionally, she is one of the few Latinas who openly supported former U.S President, Donald Trump, from the beginning. Cardenas has been described as one of Trump's inner circle.

In March 2024, she was invited by Telemundo to be the national commentator for the 2024 presidential primaries, she was the only one exclusively representing Trump. On May 18, 2024, the Trump campaign and the Republican National Committee launched their first campaign coalition, "Gun Owners for Trump," which included Cardenas. On May 22, 2024, she was endorsed by Donald Trump to serve as national at-large delegate for the 2024 Republican National Convention. She was elected by unanimous support.

As of June 2024, Cardenas was serving as a senior advisor for Latinas For Trump as part of the Donald Trump 2024 presidential campaign. In November 2024, she was appointed by President Donald J. Trump's Inaugural Committee to serve as chair of the Hispanic Inaugural Ball. Held on January 18 in Washington, D.C., the event became the largest Hispanic-focused inaugural celebration in U.S., drawing over 2,500 attendees. The guest list included heads of state such as Argentine President Javier Milei and Paraguayan President Santiago Peña, as well as prominent American political and cultural figures including Don Trump Jr., Robert F. Kennedy Jr., Kimberly Guilfoyle, Senator Ted Cruz, Senator Bernie Moreno, Vivek Ramaswamy, Miss Universe Victoria Kjær Theilvig, Myrka Dellanos, and business magnate Carlos Slim Helu, among many others. The event was widely regarded as a landmark moment in Hispanic political engagement and visibility at the presidential level.

On June 1, 2025, she made history as one of the highest-ranking Latinas within the National Rifle Association (NRA), serving as Vice Chair of the Outreach Committee.

== Achievements ==
Cardenas tops the list of Hispanics most personally invited by the President of the United States to the White House. She was among the 2018 Tribute to Women by the Texas Federation of Republican Women. Chaired the Historic 2025 Official Presidential Hispanic Inaugural Ball.
