= Carrie Coyner =

Virginia house of representatives member

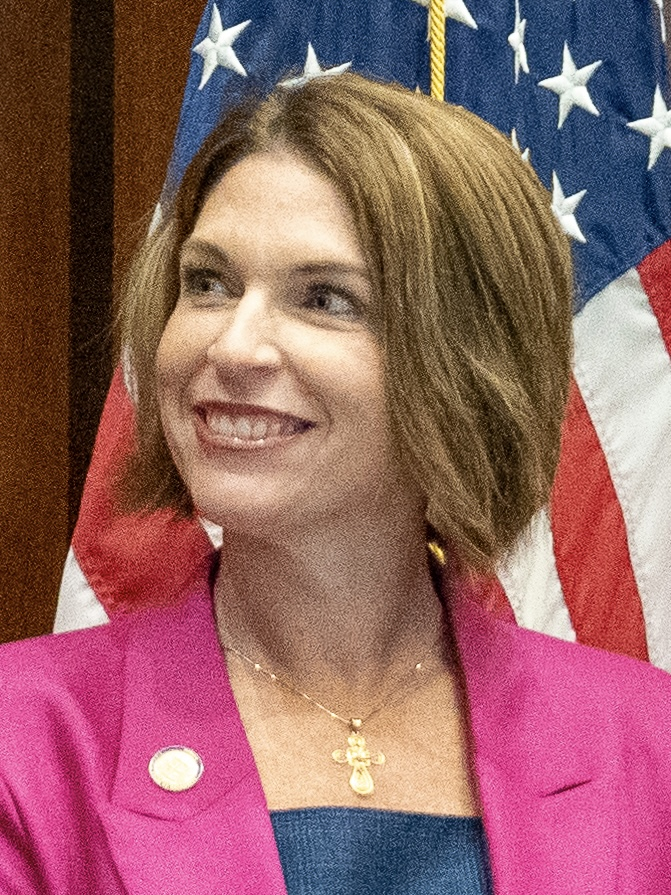

Member of the Virginia House of Delegates
- In office January 8, 2020 – January 14, 2026
- Preceded by: Riley Ingram
- Succeeded by: Lindsey Dougherty
- Constituency: 62nd district (2020–2024); 75th district (2024–2026)

Personal details
- Born: August 16, 1981 (age 44) Richmond, Virginia, U.S.
- Party: Republican
- Children: 3
- Education: University of Virginia (BA); University of Richmond (JD)
- Website: www.carriecoyner.com

Carrie Emerson Coyner (born August 16, 1981) is an American politician. She was a member of the Virginia House of Delegates, representing the 62nd district after her election in the 2019 state election, and then district 75 after winning reelection in 2023. She was defeated in the 2025 House of Delegates election.

== Political career ==
Coyner is a former member of the Chesterfield County School Board.

A Republican, Coyner ran in 2019 to succeed retiring delegate Riley Ingram for the 62nd district. She faced Democrat Lindsey Dougherty in the 2019 election, and won with 55.1% of the vote. In the 2025 election for the 75th district, Coyner was defeated by Dougherty. She was involved in the concurrent Virginia Attorney General election, releasing texts with violent rhetoric used by the ultimately successful Democratic candidate, Jay Jones.

== Political positions ==
The Washington Post described Coyner as a "moderate... who sometimes votes with Democrats." In 2021, Coyner was one of three Republicans who voted to abolish Virginia's death penalty. In 2024, Coyner was one of five Republican delegates who voted with their Democratic colleagues in support of safeguarding same-sex marriage in Virginia.

== Personal life ==
Coyner is the founder and owner of RudyCoyner Attorneys At Law.
