= John McAuliff =

American politician

Member of the Virginia House of Delegates from the 30th district
- Incumbent
- Assumed office January 14, 2026
- Preceded by: Geary Higgins

Personal details
- Born: John Chilton McAuliff; 1992 (age 33–34) New York, U.S.
- Party: Democratic
- Education: University of Richmond (BA)

John Chilton McAuliff (born 1992) is an American politician who was elected member of the Virginia House of Delegates, from the 30th district, in 2025. A member of the Democratic Party, he defeated incumbent Republican delegate Geary Higgins.

== Early life and education ==
Born in New York, McAuliff grew up in Irvington and graduating from the Masters School, where he was senior class president. He earned a bachelor's degree in leadership studies from the University of Richmond. He worked as a volunteer engineer in Peru and interned at USA Today and in Representative Nita Lowey's district office during college. He was a summer intern in the White House Internship Program in 2013.

== Career ==
McAuliff served as chief of staff to delegate David A. Reid for three years. He then worked for USDA Rural Development and in the White House Office on Clean Energy Innovation and Implementation. He runs a bed and breakfast at his late grandmother's historic home in Warrenton and served in Loudoun County's Medical Reserve Corps.

=== Virginia House of Delegates ===
McAuliff announced his campaign for the Virginia House of Delegates against incumbent Republican Geary Higgins in 2025. He campaigned against data centers in the region. He held a significant lead in campaign fundraising, having $3,032,762 in donations while Higgins had $1,093,068. McAuliff narrowly defeated Higgins in the general election, becoming the first Democratic state delegate to represent the area in over 30 years.

== Personal life ==
McAuliff is a tenth-generation descendant of Mayflower passenger Mary Chilton. His relatives have lived around Warrenton, Virginia, dating back to the Revolutionary War.

McAuliff lives in Old Tavern, Virginia, on a farm with his girlfriend.
