= Joseph McNamara (Virginia politician) =

American politician

Joseph P. McNamara
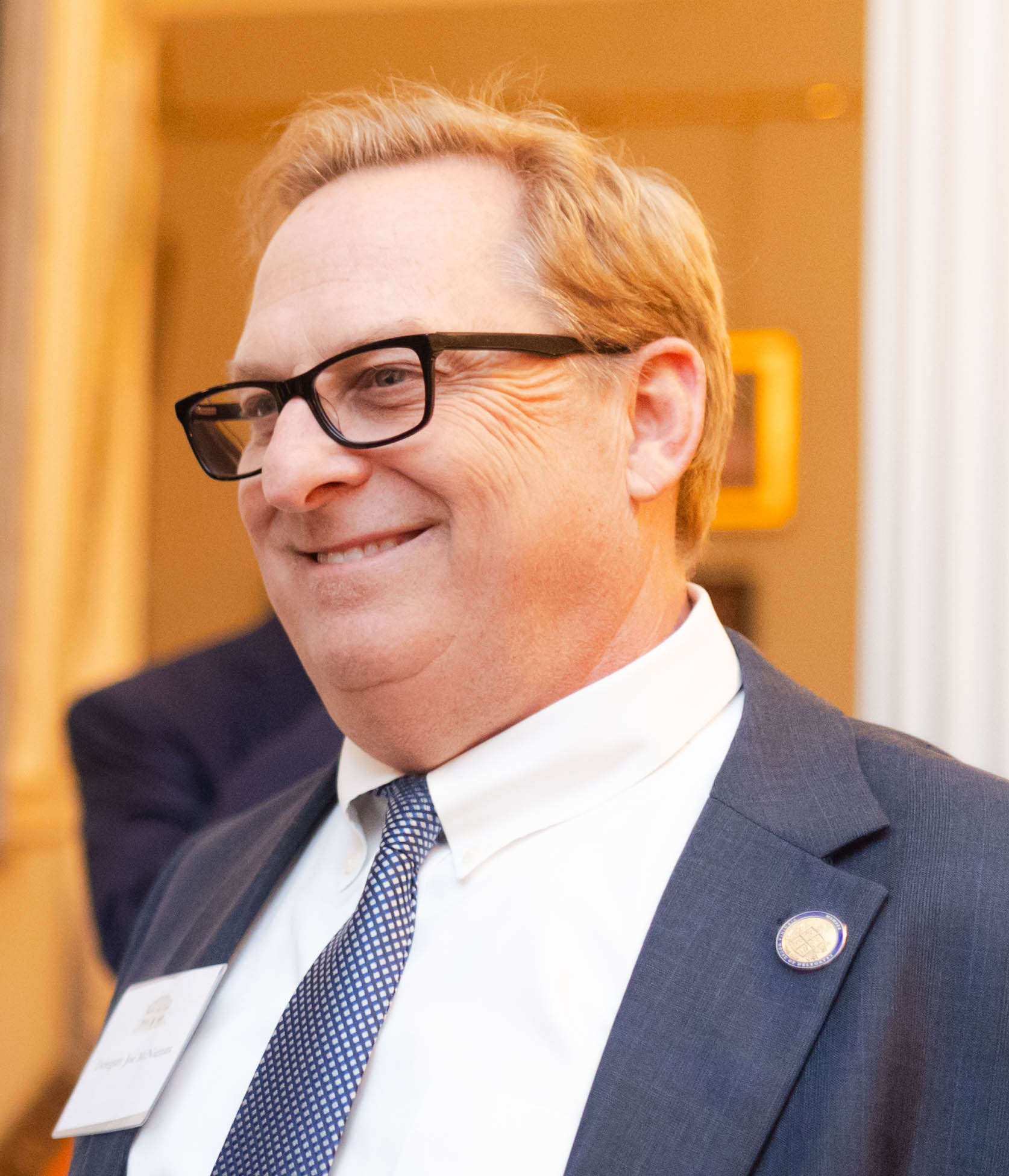

Member of the Virginia House of Delegates
- Incumbent
- Assumed office November 26, 2018
- Preceded by: Greg Habeeb
- Constituency: 8th district (2018–2024); 40th district (2024–present)

Personal details
- Born: 1963 (age 62–63) Cleveland, Ohio
- Party: Republican
- Children: 5
- Education: University of Virginia

Joseph Patrick McNamara is an American politician. He represents the Virginia's 40th district, which includes the City of Salem, Craig County, and parts of Roanoke and Montgomery Counties. He was sworn in on November 26, 2018, after Greg Habeeb announced he would resign.

McNamara is an accountant and the only licensed CPA in the Virginia House of Delegates. Additionally, he owns an ice cream shop in Roanoke County, Virginia.

== Issues and Voting Record in the 2025 Regular Season ==
In the 2025 Regular Season, McNamara voted:

- against health insurance coverage for mental health and substance abuse disorders
- present for compensation for wrongful incarceration
- against a retail cannabis market
- for health insurance coverage for contraceptive drugs and devices

== Elections ==
2018 Special general election for Virginia's 8th House District
Party	Candidate	Votes	%	±%
Republican	Joseph McNamara	21,801	62.04%	
Democratic	E. Carter Turner III	13,292	37.83%	
Other	Write in	47	0.13%	
