= Virginia's 8th House of Delegates district =

Virginia legislative district

Virginia's State House of Delegates district
- District map from the 2023 election
Delegate
Irene Shin; D–Herndon
- Demographics: 39% White; 8% Black; 20% Hispanic; 27% Asian; 0% Native American; 0% Hawaiian/Pacific Islander; 1% Other; 6% Multiracial
- Population (2024) • Voting age: 87,554; 18
- Registered voters: 57,668

Virginia's 8th House of Delegates district is one of 100 seats in the Virginia House of Delegates, the lower house of the state's bicameral legislature. District 8 contains portions of Fairfax County. It is currently represented Democrat Irene Shin. The district was previously represented by Republican Joseph McNamara, who was redistricted out, and prior by Greg Habeeb from 2012 until his resignation in August 2018. In 2017, he won against Democrat Steve McBride.

== District officeholders ==
Years	Delegate	Party	Electoral history
January 8, 1992 – January 12, 1994	G. Steven Agee	Republican	Declined to seek reelection
January 12, 1994 – January 3, 2011	Morgan Griffith	Republican	Majority Leader of the House of Delegates (2000-10); Declined to seek reelection; Elected to the US House of Representatives
January 3, 2011 – August 31, 2018	Greg Habeeb	Republican	First elected in 2010. Resigned.
November 26, 2018 – January 10, 2024	Joseph McNamara	Republican	Elected via special election held due to resignation of Delegate Greg Habeeb. (redistricted to the 40th District)
January 10, 2024 – present	Irene Shin	Democratic	Redistricted from the 86th District

== Electoral history ==
2015 General Election, Virginia 8th House of Delegates
Party	Candidate	Votes	%	±%
Republican	Greg Habeeb	16,684	100.00%	n/a
Total votes		16,684	100.00%	n/a

2016 General Election, Presidential
Party	Candidate	Votes	%	±%
Republican	Donald Trump	24,060	62.38%	n/a
Democratic	Hillary Clinton	12,413	32.18%	n/a
Libertarian	Gary Johnson	1,323	3.43%	n/a
Independent	Evan McMullin	527	1.37%	n/a
Green	Jill Stein	248	0.64%	n/a
Total votes		38,571	100.00%	n/a
