= Nick Freitas =

American politician (born 1979)

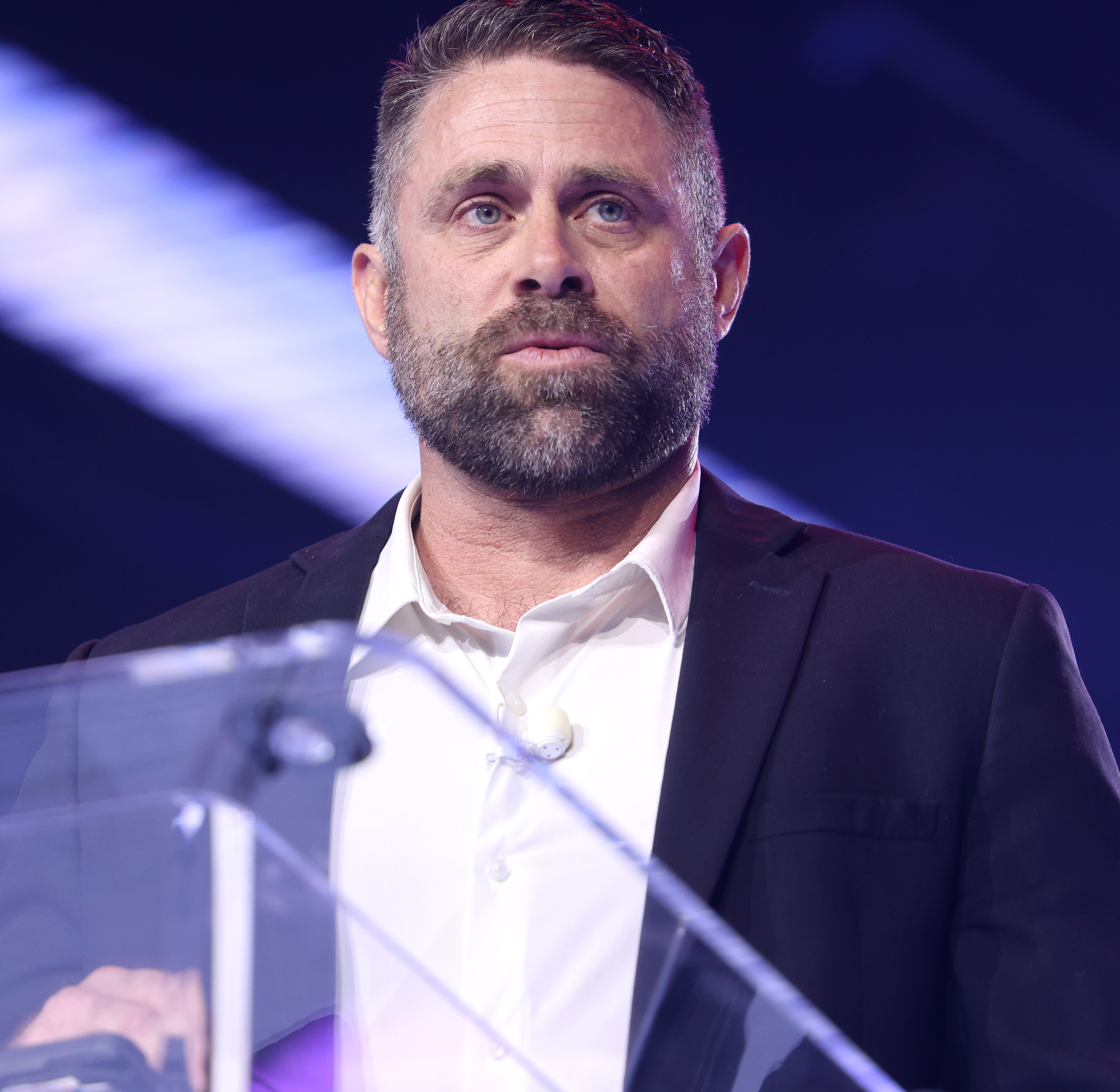
- Freitas in 2025

Member of the Virginia House of Delegates
- In office January 13, 2016 – January 14, 2026
- Preceded by: Ed Scott
- Succeeded by: Karen Hamilton
- Constituency: 30th district (2016–2024); 62nd district (2024–2026)

Personal details
- Born: Nicholas Jason Freitas; August 29, 1979 (age 47) Chico, California, U.S.
- Party: Republican
- Spouse: Tina Pierce (since 1999)
- Children: 3
- Education: Henley-Putnam University (BA)
- Website: Campaign website

Military service
- Allegiance: United States
- Branch: United States Army
- Service years: 1998–2009
- Rank: Sergeant First Class
- Unit: 1st Special Forces Group
- Conflict: Iraq War

YouTube information
- Channel: Nick Freitas
- Genre: Political commentary
- Subscribers: 1.5 million
- Views: 1.2 billion
- Last updated: June 7, 2026

Nicholas Jason Freitas (born August 29, 1979) is an American politician and social media influencer. He served in the U.S. military. A Republican, he served as a member of the Virginia House of Delegates from 2016 to 2026. He unsuccessfully sought the Republican nomination for U.S. Senate in 2018, narrowly losing in the primary election to Corey Stewart. He was the Republican nominee in the 2020 election to represent Virginia's 7th congressional district in the United States House of Representatives, which he lost by 49% to 51% to Abigail Spanberger.

== Early life and education ==
Freitas, who is of Portuguese and Scottish ancestry, was born in Chico, California, on August 29, 1979, the son of Robin McMichael and John Freitas. After graduating high school, Freitas joined the United States Army and subsequently graduated from Henley-Putnam School of Strategic Security with a B.S. in Intelligence Management.

Following the September 11 terrorist attacks, Freitas joined the U.S. Army Special Forces (Green Berets) and served two tours in Iraq. After being honorably discharged in 2009, Freitas moved to Culpeper County, Virginia in 2010 and served as an operations director for a service-disabled veteran-owned company.

== Political career ==
Freitas became the chairman of the Culpeper County Republican Committee in 2010.

=== Virginia House of Delegates ===
Freitas was a member of the Virginia House of Delegates, representing District 62. He assumed office in 2016, and his most recent term ended on January 14, 2026.

==== 2015 ====
In 2015, Freitas ran for the Virginia House of Delegates for the 30th district, then held by Republican Ed Scott. After Scott announced his retirement, Freitas was unopposed in both the Republican primary and the general election, and took office in January 2016.

The 30th district comprises Madison County, Orange County, and the southern half of Culpeper County.

==== 2017 ====
He ran for re-election in 2017 and won with 62% of the vote over Democrat Ben Hixon.

==== 2019 ====
On July 18, 2019, Freitas withdrew from the 2019 election for House of Delegates after failing to submit required paperwork to the Board of Elections in the Commonwealth of Virginia by the deadline. On August 8, 2019, Freitas announced that he would mount a write-in campaign for re-election and won with 57.89% of the vote.

As a member of the House of Delegates, Freitas serves on the following committees: Science and Technology; Militia, Police and Public Safety; and Finance.

==== 2021 ====
Freitas ran for re-election to the Virginia House of Delegates to represent District 30. He won in the general election on November 2, 2021.

==== 2023 ====
Freitas ran for re-election again in 2023, in the post-reapportionment District 62. He won the general election on November 7, with 62% of the vote.

=== Congressional campaigns ===
==== 2018 U.S. Senate election ====
Freitas sought the Republican nomination for the United States Senate seat in the 2018 election. He was endorsed by Senators Rand Paul and Mike Lee. During the Republican primary campaign, Freitas characterized his rival, Prince William County Chairman Corey Stewart, as a "hate-monger." He said, "we must reject Corey Stewart's dog-whistling of White supremacists, anti-Semites, and racists."

In the June 2018 primary, Freitas narrowly lost the Republican nomination. Stewart took 44.9% of the vote, Freitas took 43.1% of the vote, and E. W. Jackson took 12.0% of the vote."

==== 2020 U.S. House election ====
In December 2019, Freitas announced his candidacy for Virginia's 7th congressional district, in which he sought and won the Republican Party nomination to challenge incumbent Representative Abigail Spanberger in the 2020 general election. Freitas earned early endorsements from conservative organizations the Club for Growth and FreedomWorks. Freitas was considered to be an early front-runner for the Republican nomination due to opinion polls giving him the lead in support and name recognition. Freitas's state delegate district includes much of the congressional district's western portion.

Freitas lost the closely fought election, receiving about 49% of the vote to Spanberger's 51% of the vote. Spanberger dominated in the most populous parts of the district, in Chesterfield and Henrico counties in Greater Richmond, while Freitas led in the less-populous parts of the district in outlying Culpeper, Orange, Spotsylvania, Louisa, Goochland, Powhatan, Amelia, and Nottoway counties. Ultimately, Spanberger's combined 43,000-vote margin in Henrico and Chesterfield proved too much for Freitas to overcome; it was more than five times Spanberger's overall margin of 8,400 votes.

== Political views ==
Early in his tenure in the House of Delegates, Freitas was described as having a "conservative voting record and libertarian streak."

He has called for the repeal of the Affordable Care Act (Obamacare), describing it as a "cancer." He supports the construction of a wall on the border with Mexico. In 2016, he urged the Culpeper County School Board to disregard an Obama administration mandate that transgender students be allowed the use of the restrooms that correspond to their gender identity. He called it unconstitutional, and said the Obama administration does not "get to arbitrarily redefine what gender means."

In 2018, Freitas praised Donald Trump, saying he had been a stronger leader in his first year than Barack Obama had been during his eight years. Freitas has called for abolishing the federal income tax, replacing it with a national sales tax. He supported the 2017 Republican tax legislation. In 2018, Freitas opposed the Iran nuclear agreement and supported Trump's decision to withdraw the U.S. from it.

In 2020, Freitas voted against legislation in the Virginia General Assembly to gradually increase the state minimum wage to $12 per hour by 2023. He opposes proposals to increase the federal minimum wage.

Freitas voted in favor of marijuana decriminalization during the January 2020 session of the General Assembly. He stated: "I'd rather we use law enforcement resources to go after violent criminals and people that are creating victims."

In a speech given in March 2018 on the floor of the House of Delegates, Freitas voiced opposition to further gun control proposals following the mass shooting at Marjory Stoneman Douglas High School in Parkland, Florida. The speech went viral and drew over 11 million views on Freitas's Facebook page, and drew criticism from several Black Democrats in the chamber for asserting that it was the party of slavery and Jim Crow amidst a speech focused on gun laws.

In response to the assassination of Charlie Kirk, Freitas described the killing as part of a "war between diametrically opposed worldviews which cannot peacefully coexist with one another," drawing criticism from Democrats, including Virginia House Speaker Don Scott.

== Personal life ==
Freitas is a Protestant Christian and attended Mountain View Church while living in Culpeper. He married Tina M. Pierce, whom he met in high school. They have three children. Freitas is a member of the Heritage Foundation and the National Rifle Association of America. In 2026, he left Virginia and moved to Tennessee.

In 2019, Freitas' wife challenged incumbent Republican Emmett Hanger for his Senate seat in Virginia's 24th district. She was defeated in the primary, gaining 43% of the vote to Hanger's 57%.
