= Geary Higgins =

American politician from Virginia

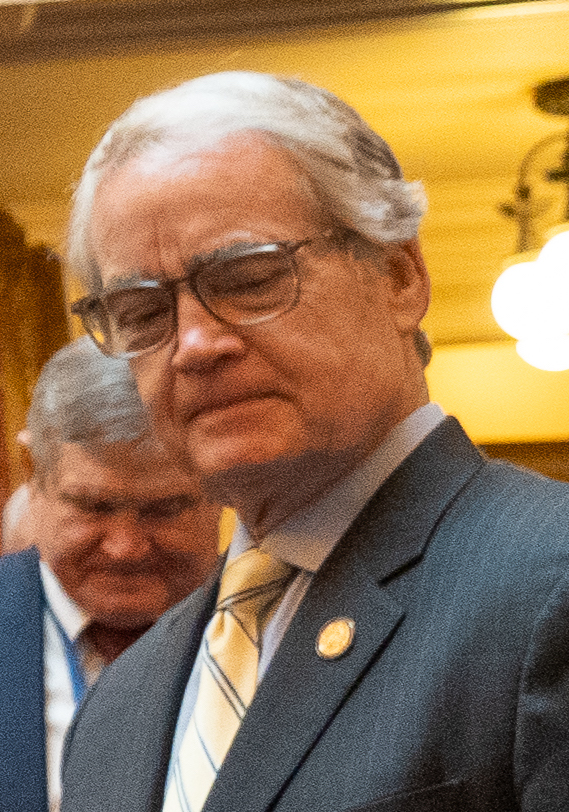

Member of the Virginia House of Delegates from the 30th district
- In office January 10, 2024 – January 14, 2026
- Preceded by: Dave LaRock (redistricting)
- Succeeded by: John McAuliff

Member of the Loudoun County Board of Supervisors from the Catoctin District
- In office January 1, 2012 – December 31, 2019
- Preceded by: Sally Kurtz
- Succeeded by: Caleb Kershner

Member of the Loudoun County School Board from the Catoctin District
- In office January 1, 2000 – December 31, 2003
- Preceded by: Harry Brown
- Succeeded by: Mark Nuzzaco

Personal details
- Party: Republican

Geary Michael Higgins is an American politician and business consultant who served as a member of the Virginia House of Delegates for the 30th district from 2024 to 2026. A member of the Republican Party, he was elected to the Virginia House of Delegates in the 2023 Virginia House of Delegates election and previously served as a member of the Loudoun County Board of Supervisors from 2012 to 2019 and on the Loudoun County School Board from 2000 to 2003.

He lost his 2025 re-election campaign to Democrat John McAuliff.
