= Lindsey Dougherty =

American politician

Lindsey M. Dougherty
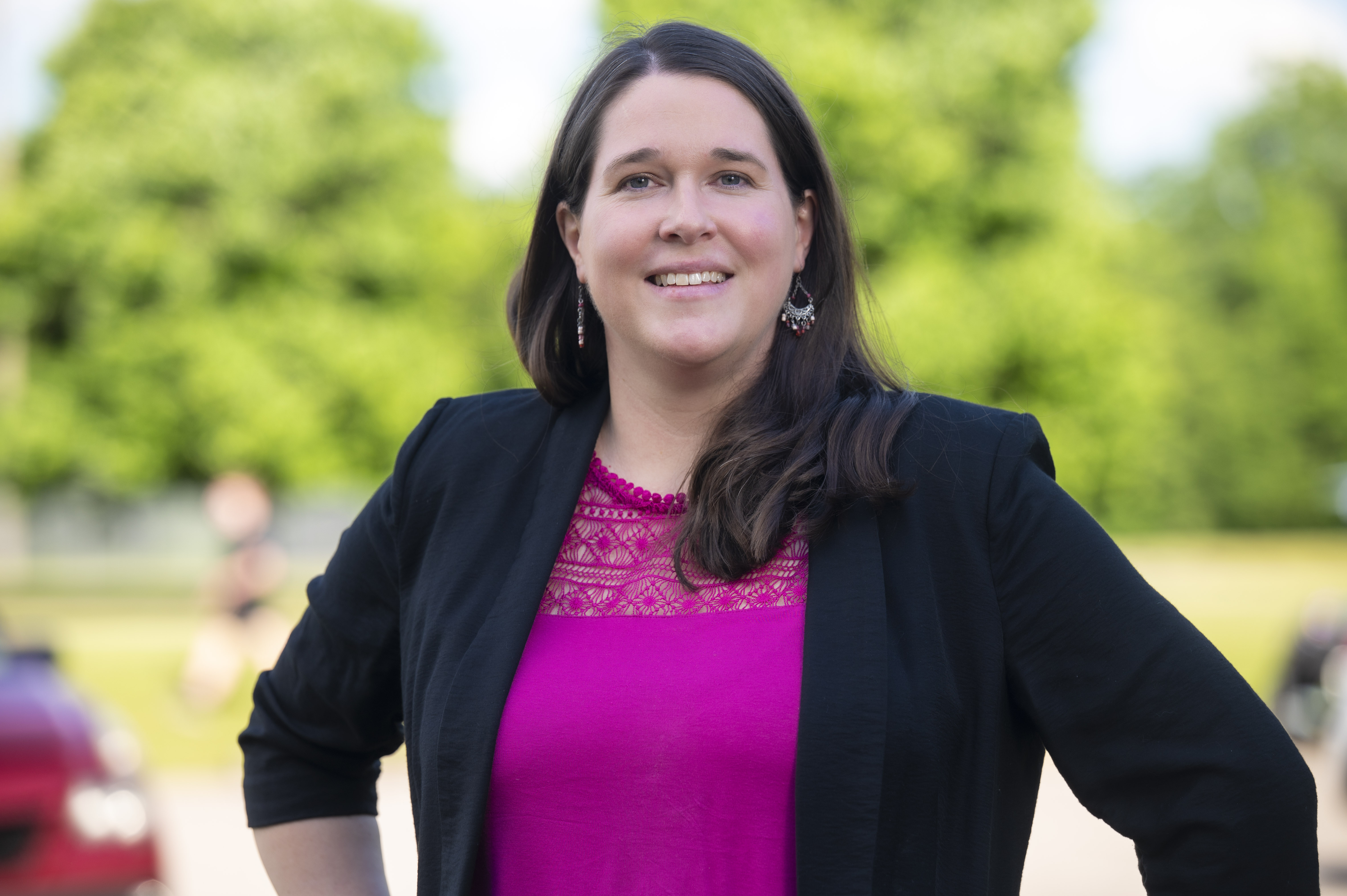

Member of the Virginia House of Delegates from the 75th district
- Incumbent
- Assumed office January 14, 2026
- Preceded by: Carrie Coyner

Personal details
- Born: 1983 (age 42–43) Knoxville, Tennessee
- Party: Democratic
- Spouse: Brent (m. 2006)
- Children: 2
- Education: University of Tennessee (BA); North Carolina State University (MA)
- Occupation: Senior research administrator
- Website: Official website Campaign website

Lindsey M. Dougherty (born 1983) is an American politician who was elected as a member of the Virginia House of Delegates in 2025. A member of the Democratic Party, she defeated incumbent Republican Carrie Coyner. She previously contested the seat in 2019.

== Early life and career ==
Dougherty is from Knoxville, Tennessee. She attended the University of Tennessee, where she received her Bachelor of Arts. She later moved with her husband to Raleigh, North Carolina and pursued her Master's degree in public administration from North Carolina State University. She moved to Chesterfield, Virginia in 2017 to set down roots with her family. She has previously worked in juvenile justice, managed a billion dollar budget for a local government in Virginia, and currently is a senior research administrator at Virginia Commonwealth University (VCU) in Richmond, VA.

== Political career ==
Dougherty first ran for public office in 2019 in the 62nd district, against former Chesterfield County School Board member Carrie Coyner. Coyner defeated Dougherty by a ten point margin.

Dougherty ran for the Chesterfield County Board of Supervisor's Bermuda magisterial district seat in 2023, against Jim Ingle. She lost that race by less than 1,000 votes.

In 2025, Dougherty announced another campaign against Coyner, in the recently redrawn 75th House of Delegates District. During the campaign she supported expanding mental health services, increasing funding to public schools to further support teachers and support staff, and expanding the affordability and accessibility of housing and healthcare in the district. Dougherty defeated Coyner by a 5.9 point margin. As a representative who has been known for prioritizing education initiatives, Dougherty was named the "2026 Legislative Rookie of the Year" by the Virginia Education Association.
