= Chris Collins (Virginia politician) =

American politician (born 1971)

Member of the Virginia House of Delegates from the 29th district
- In office January 13, 2016 – June 28, 2020
- Preceded by: Mark Berg
- Succeeded by: Bill Wiley

Personal details
- Born: March 22, 1971 (age 55) Lynchburg, Virginia
- Party: Republican
- Spouse: Therese Marie Frank
- Children: 1
- Education: Shenandoah University; James Madison University; University of Baltimore
- Profession: Lawyer
- Committees: Courts of Justice; Counties, Cities and Towns

Military service
- Allegiance: United States
- Branch: United States Army
- Service years: 1989–1993; 2005–2009
- Unit: Army National Guard

Christopher E. Collins (born March 22, 1971) is a former member of the Virginia House of Delegates. He was first elected in 2015, and represented the 29th district comprising the City of Winchester and parts of Frederick County and Warren County.

On June 28, 2020, Collins resigned in order to accept an appointment as a judge to Virginia's 26th judicial district.
