= Edward T. Scott =

American politician

Ed Scott

Member of the Virginia House of Delegates from the 30th district
- In office January 14, 2004 – January 13, 2016
- Preceded by: George Broman
- Succeeded by: Nick Freitas

Personal details
- Born: August 6, 1965 (age 61) Culpeper, Virginia, U.S.
- Party: Republican
- Spouse: Amanda Rebecca Lohr
- Children: Danielle
- Education: Virginia Tech
- Occupation: Small business owner
- Committees: Agriculture, Chesapeake and Natural Resources; Appropriations; Science and Technology; Transportation
- Website: www.delegateedscott.com

Edward T. "Ed" Scott (born August 6, 1965) is an American politician. From 2004 to 2016 he served in the Virginia House of Delegates, representing the 30th district in the Virginia Piedmont, including Madison and Orange Counties, plus part of Culpeper County. He is a member of the Republican Party.

== Electoral history ==
Date	Election	Candidate	Party	Votes	%
Virginia House of Delegates, 30th district
June 10, 2003	Republican primary	E T Scott		3,215	53.04
June 10, 2003	Republican primary	S R Found		1,526	25.18
June 10, 2003	Republican primary	D W Rogers		1,320	21.78
November 4, 2003	General	E T Scott	Republican	10,261	86.22
November 4, 2003	General	W C Thompson		1,637	13.76
November 4, 2003	General	Write Ins		3	0.03
November 4, 2003	General	George Broman retired; seat stayed Republican			
June 14, 2005	Republican primary	E T Scott		3,979	64.88
June 14, 2005	Republican primary	R M Jarvis		2,154	35.12
November 8, 2005	General	E T Scott	Republican	16,025	99.65
November 8, 2005	General	Write Ins		56	0.35
November 6, 2007	General	Edward T. Scott	Republican	16,503	99.29
November 6, 2007	General	Write Ins		118	0.70
November 3, 2009	General	Edward T. Scott	Republican	15,959	75.49
November 3, 2009	General	Matt A. Carson		5,154	24.38
November 3, 2009	General	Write Ins		27	0.12
November 8, 2011	General	Edward T. Scott	Republican	14,914	98.91
November 8, 2011	General	Write Ins		163	1.08
