= Dave Albo =

American politician (born 1962)

David B. Albo

Member of the Virginia House of Delegates from the 42nd district
- In office January 13, 1994 – January 10, 2018
- Preceded by: Robert K. Cunningham Sr.
- Succeeded by: Kathy Tran

Personal details
- Born: April 18, 1962 (age 64) Flushing, New York, U.S.
- Party: Republican
- Spouse: Rita Irene Von Essen
- Children: Ben
- Education: University of Virginia (BA), University of Richmond School of Law (JD)
- Profession: Lawyer
- Committees: Courts of Justice (chair); General Laws; Privileges and Elections
- Website: https://www.davealbo.com/

David B. Albo (born April 18, 1962) is a retired Republican politician from the Commonwealth of Virginia, USA. He represented the 42nd district of the Virginia House of Delegates from 1994 to 2018.

== Personal ==
Albo grew up in Springfield, Virginia. He graduated from Fairfax County public schools – Rolling Valley Elementary and West Springfield High School. He has a B.A. degree in economics from the University of Virginia and a J.D. degree from the University of Richmond School of Law.

== Political career ==
Albo was first elected to the Virginia House of Delegates in 1994. He was the most senior Northern Virginia majority party delegate in the House of Delegates. Albo was Chairman of the Courts of Justice Committee and a member of the General Laws and Privileges and Elections committees and a member of the Joint Legislative Audit and Review Commission. As Chairman of the House of Delegates Courts of Justice committee in 2006 Mr. Albo oversaw the writing of all of the Virginia civil procedure changes including; the creation of the Bill of Complaint as the primary civil pleading, the revision of the jurisdictional limits of the courts, and the modernization of evidentiary law. In addition, Albo oversaw or drafted most of Virginia’s criminal law changes such as; the elimination of parole, the major revision of the drunk driving laws, and most of Virginia’s anti-gang laws. Albo’s complete legislative record is available at lis.virginia.gov.

=== Major legislation ===
Anti-Terrorism Bill: Albo's 2002 bill, HB 1120, defines an act of terror, increases the penalty for possession of bomb material and hoax bomb devices, empowers Virginia law enforcement to effectively respond to terrorism, and outlines the punishment for terrorism. People found guilty of conspiring or committing an act of terror may be subject to either the death penalty or life in prison. The bill was infamously used to prosecute John Allen Muhammad and Lee Boyd Malvo, who were responsible for the “Beltway Sniper Attacks.”

Anonymous Internet Defamation: Albo’s 2015 bill, HB 1635, extends the statute of limitations until the anonymous publisher’s identity is determined in an internet defamation lawsuit. Albo proposed the bill on behalf of a constituent who was the victim of disparaging comments on FairfaxUnderground.com.

Animal Cruelty: Throughout his political career, Albo has supported legislation to protect animals. Organizations such as Humane Dominion have recognized Albo for his efforts. He is responsible for making treatment programs mandatory for animal abuse violators and strengthening penalties for repeat offenders of the animal cruelty statue through his 2007 and 2010 legislation. In 2016, Albo’s bill restored the powers of a standard law enforcement officer for Fairfax County Animal Control Officers.

Cannabis Oil for the treatment of epilepsy: In 1979, Virginia passed a law making possession of marijuana legal for the treatment of cancer and glaucoma legal with a valid prescription from a doctor. However, the term “valid prescription” prevented doctors from prescribing it due to the Federal Schedule 1 status of the drug. The law was in place until Albo’s 2015 legislation, HB 1445, changed the language from “prescription” to “recommendation.” Albo’s bill also added treatment of epilepsy to the acceptable list of illnesses. Albo cites the stories of three constituents’ children as his inspiration, "There are a bunch of kids with Dravet syndrome that have hundreds of seizures and the oil from marijuana alleviates the seizures.” NBC’s Dateline, aired a special series, “Growing Hope.” The series covered the legislative tracking of the bill and personal stories of the patients.

Other notable legislation:

- 2004: HB 1080 – Requires an intake officer to notify a school superintendent when a student is involved with a juvenile case relating to gang activity.
- 2005: HB 1573 – Increased the penalty for gang-related activity that take place near school property.
- 2006: HB 847 – Requires juvenile justice officials to collect data on incarcerated gang members and give their findings to the Commonwealth Attorney’s Services Council. In turn, the Council shares the information with state prosecutors. Albo was also a co-patron on HB 588 which made brandishing a machete near school property a Class 1 misdemeanor.
- 2007: HB 2429 – Empowers the Attorney General, with the consent of the local Commonwealth attorney, to assist in the prosecution of certain gang and terrorism crimes. The bill also defines aiding or committing an act of terror as a Class 4 felony.
- 2008: HB 820 – Requires correctional facility officers to check the legal status of inmates and report their findings to Local Inmate Data System of the State Compensation Board.
- 2010: HB 736 – Requires Virginia circuit courts and Department of State Police to report information to the Virginia Child Protection Accountability System.
- 2011: HB 1476 – Extends the limitation period for victims of sexual abuse to take legal action from two years to twenty years.
- 2013: HB 1847 – Adds murder, aggravated malicious wounding, and other offenses to the definition of a predicate criminal act involving gang activity.
- 2016: HB 177 – Adds additional crimes such as engaging prostitution with a minor under the age of 13 to the Sex Offender and Crimes Against Minors Registry Act. Albo is also the chief patron of HB 886, which creates a Class 6 felony for a second stalking offense within five years of the first offense.

== Electoral history ==
Date	Election	Candidate	Party	Votes	%
Virginia House of Delegates, 42nd district
Nov 2, 1993	General	David B. "Dave" Albo	Republican	7,813	53.00%
Nov 2, 1993	General	Laurie A. Frost	Democratic	6,919	46.90%
Nov 7, 1995	General	David B. "Dave" Albo	Republican	7,402	58.30%
Nov 7, 1995	General	Mark S. Cecelski	Democratic	5,287	41.60%
Nov 4, 1997	General	David B. "Dave" Albo	Republican	11,200	75.99%
Nov 4, 1997	General	Ali M. Ghaemi	Democratic	3,512	23.80%
Nov 2, 1999	General	David B. "Dave" Albo	Republican	9,075	99.32%
Nov 2, 1999	General	Write Ins		62	0.70%
Nov 6, 2001	General	David B. "Dave" Albo	Republican	11,258	61.10%
Nov 6, 2001	General	David B. Collins	Democratic	7,173	38.90%
Nov 4, 2003	General	David B. "Dave" Albo	Republican	9,325	98.50%
Nov 4, 2003	General	Write Ins		139	1.50%
Nov 8, 2005	General	David B. "Dave" Albo	Republican	10,257	51.16%
Nov 8, 2005	General	Gregory A. Werkheiser	Democratic	9,479	47.70%
Nov 6, 2007	General	David B. "Dave" Albo	Republican	9,947	87.65%
Nov 6, 2007	General	Write Ins		1,402	12.40%
Nov 3, 2009	General	David B. "Dave" Albo	Republican	11,767	56.56%
Nov 3, 2009	General	Gregory A. Werkheiser	Democratic	9,006	43.29%
Nov 8, 2011	General	David B. "Dave" Albo	Republican	11,835	62.13%
Nov 8, 2011	General	John R. Dobbyn, Jr.	Democratic	7,199	37.79%
Nov 5, 2013	General	David B. "Dave" Albo	Republican	15,303	59.83%
Nov 5, 2013	General	Edward R. Deitsch	Democratic	10,247	40.06%
Nov 3, 2015	General	David B. "Dave" Albo	Republican	10,837	63.44%
Nov 3, 2015	General	Joana C. Garcia	Democratic	6,245	36.56%

== Fees for driving violations ==
Albo supported large surcharges for felony and misdemeanor level driving convictions in 2007, a plan that met strong resistance from some Virginia residents. The money raised by the Virginia bill would to go toward transportation funding. Albo was singled out for criticism in part because his law practice specializes in traffic defense, and could ostensibly gain from the new law. Albo countered by arguing that increased punishments on crimes could possibly lower the occurrence of crimes decreasing business for lawyers. He further pointed out that this was the case with the "Abuser Fees" that lowered the number of Reckless Driving charges. However, other studies have correlated increased ticketing rates in the years following those in which government revenue has declined.

A primary area of controversy stemmed from the fact that the final bill was amended by the Governor to apply the abuser fees only to Virginia residents, and not those residing in other states. Albo defended the Governor's amendment and described it as a "weakness" but still advocated passage. The following session he voted to repeal his own "Abuser Fees." Responding to the public outcry elected officials repealed the bill in 2008.

== Professional career ==
Albo was an assistant city attorney for the City of Fairfax from 1990 to 1994, before going into private practice. During the period from 1988 to 1994 Albo was appointed by the courts to serve as guardian ad litem for abused and neglected children. Albo served as President of the West Springfield Civic Association from 1989 to 1993. He was a partner at a law firm that he co-founded, Albo & Oblon, LLP, until the firm closed in 2017. Albo is currently a Partner at WilliamsMullen in Tysons, Virginia.

In 2010, Albo was recognized as one of the “Leaders in the Law” by the Virginia Lawyer’s Weekly for his leadership in improving Virginia’s justice system, changing Virginia law, and his important contributions to Virginia’s legal community.
