= Riley Ingram =

American politician (born 1941)

Member of the Virginia House of Delegates from the 62nd district
- In office January 1992 – January 8, 2020
- Preceded by: R. Beasley Jones
- Succeeded by: Carrie Coyner

Personal details
- Born: October 1, 1941 (age 84) Halifax County, Virginia
- Party: Republican
- Spouse: Mary Ann Brinkley (deceased)
- Children: Tracy Crowder, Stacy Hansen, Riley Ingram Jr.
- Occupation: Real estate
- Committees: Counties, Cities and Towns (chair); Appropriations; Privileges and Elections

Military service
- Branch/service: United States Army
- Years of service: 1959–1968
- Unit: Virginia Army National Guard 1959–1962; United States Army Reserve 1962–1968

Riley Edward Ingram (born October 1, 1941) is an American politician. From 1992-2020 he served in the Virginia House of Delegates, representing the 62nd district east of Richmond, made up of parts of Chesterfield, Henrico and Prince George Counties and the city of Hopewell. He is a member of the Republican Party.

== Positions and appointments ==
Ingram was co-chair of the House committee on Counties, Cities and Towns 1998–2001 having been appointed in 2002.

He served on the committees on:

- Appropriations (1998–)
- Counties, Cities and Towns (1992–)
- General Laws (1998–2001)
- Militia and Police (2000–2001)
- Mining and Mineral Resources (1992–1999)
- Privileges and Elections (1992–)

== Electoral history ==
Ingram was elected to the Hopewell city council in 1986, and became mayor in 1988.

In 1989, he challenged 28-year Democratic incumbent Charles Hardaway Marks in the 64th House district, but lost. He was re-elected to the Hopewell city council in 1990.

In the 1991 redistricting, the 62nd House district was moved northwards to include Hopewell. Ingram defeated another Democratic incumbent, R. Beasley Jones, for the House seat.

Riley retired and did not file for the 2019 election.

| Date | Election | Candidate | Party | Votes | % |
Virginia House of Delegates, 64th district
| November 7, 1989 | General | Charles Hardaway Marks | Democratic | 8,992 | 56.32 |
| November 7, 1989 | General | Riley Edward Ingram | Republican | 6,971 | 43.66 |
| November 7, 1989 | General | Write Ins | | 3 | 0.02 |
| November 7, 1989 | General | Incumbent won; seat stayed Democratic | | | |
Virginia House of Delegates, 62nd district
| November 5, 1991 | General | Riley Edward Ingram | Republican | 7,589 | 54.03 |
| November 5, 1991 | General | Robert Beasley Jones | Democratic | 6,454 | 45.95 |
| November 5, 1991 | General | Write Ins | | 2 | 0.02 |
| November 5, 1991 | General | Incumbent lost; seat switched from Democratic to Republican | | | |
| November 2, 1993 | General | Riley Edward Ingram | Republican | 12,380 | 69.52 |
| November 2, 1993 | General | Peter D. Eliades | Democratic | 5,428 | 30.48 |
| November 7, 1995 | General | R E Ingram | Republican | 11,981 | 74.29 |
| November 7, 1995 | General | D M Brown | Democratic | 4,147 | 25.71 |
| November 4, 1997 | General | Riley E. Ingram | Republican | 13,123 | 99.64 |
| November 4, 1997 | General | Write Ins | | 47 | 0.36 |
| November 2, 1999 | General | R E Ingram | Republican | 10,940 | 99.73 |
| November 2, 1999 | General | Write Ins | | 30 | 0.27 |
| November 6, 2001 | General | R E Ingram | Republican | 14,476 | 97.87 |
| November 6, 2001 | General | Write Ins | | 315 | 2.13 |
| November 4, 2003 | General | R E Ingram | Republican | 9,720 | 98.67 |
| November 4, 2003 | General | Write Ins | | 131 | 1.33 |
| November 8, 2005 | General | R E Ingram | Republican | 15,571 | 97.00 |
| November 8, 2005 | General | Write Ins | | 481 | 3.00 |
| November 6, 2007 | General | Riley Edward Ingram | Republican | 10,449 | 98.15 |
| November 6, 2007 | General | Write Ins | | 196 | 1.84 |
| November 3, 2009 | General | Riley Edward Ingram | Republican | 15,514 | 97.51 |
| November 3, 2009 | General | Write Ins | | 396 | 2.48 |
| November 8, 2011 | General | Riley Edward Ingram | Republican | 8,911 | 95.80 |
| November 8, 2011 | General | Write Ins | | 390 | 4.19 |
