= Tom Rust =

American politician

Member of the Virginia House of Delegates from the 86th district
- In office January 9, 2002 – January 13, 2016
- Preceded by: Donald L. Williams
- Succeeded by: Jennifer Boysko

Personal details
- Born: Thomas Davis Rust; July 21, 1941 (age 85) Front Royal, Virginia, U.S.
- Party: Republican
- Spouse: Ann
- Education: Virginia Tech; George Washington University; University of Virginia
- Profession: Civil engineer
- Website: www.tomrust.org

Thomas Davis Rust (born July 21, 1941) is an American politician of the Republican Party. He is a former member of the Virginia House of Delegates, representing the 86th District from 2002 to 2016. Previously, he was mayor of Herndon, Virginia for 19 years (1976–84, 1990–2001).

== Political ==
Rust was first elected to the Herndon Town Council in 1971, where he served until he was elected mayor of the Town of Herndon in 1976, a position he held until 1984. He was elected mayor again in 1990 and served until 2001.

In 2001, Rust was elected delegate for the 86th District with 63% of the vote against Jim Kelly. A civil engineer, Rust has served on the Committees on Transportation, Education, Science and Technology, and Commerce and Labor. His notable legislation includes allowing the Commonwealth Transportation Board to establish a statewide transportation plan using highway corridors for long-term, regional planning.

=== State and local elected offices ===
- Mayor, Town of Herndon, (1976–1984, 1990–2001)
- Herndon Town Council (1971–1976)

=== House of Delegates committees (2009) ===
- Commerce and Labor
- Education (Chair of Subcommittee on Higher Education)
- Science and Technology (Vice chair)
- Transportation (Chair of Subcommittee #4)
