= Virginia's 86th House of Delegates district =

Virginia state legislative district

District map from the 2023 election

Virginia's 86th House of Delegates district elects one of 100 seats in the Virginia House of Delegates, the lower house of the state's bicameral legislature. The district was established in 1982 and represents parts of Loudoun and Fairfax County. It has been represented by Democrat Virgil Thornton since 2026.

== Geography ==
Since November 2023, the 86th District has included all of Poquoson and parts of Hampton and York County.

== Electoral history ==
From 2002 to 2016, the 86th District was represented by Republican Tom Rust. In 2013, he was challenged by Democrat Jennifer Boysko, with Rust narrowly prevailing, winning by just 32 votes. Boysko ran again in the next cycle (2015) and Rust announced he would retire rather than seek reelection. Boysko instead faced Republican Raul “Danny” Vargas and Paul Brubaker, who ran as an independent. Vargas received The Washington Post's endorsement and initially had support from the Latino Victory Fund, but the latter rescinded its support after learning Vargas did not support an Obama Administration immigration policy offering protection from deportation and temporary work permits to some parents of American citizens (DAPA). Boysko, a pro-choice candidate who supported the Medicaid expansion, won the election, receiving 54% of the vote to Vargas's 40%.

The 86th district seat was vacated again when Boysko was elected to the state senate in January 2019. prompting a February 19 special election. Dentist Ibraheem Samirah won the Democratic nomination in a firehouse primary on January 12, and U.S. Air Force veteran Gregg Nelson received the Republican nomination in a mass meeting held January 22. On January 25, former Herndon town council member Connie H. Hutchinson announced her candidacy as an independent, citing her opposition to a bill to lift restriction on abortion as well as concerns about proposals to raise the minimum wage. Samirah won the contest with 59.5% of the vote and was sworn in the next day, becoming the youngest member of the state legislature.

On February 4, 2021, Irene Shin, the executive director of The Virginia Civic Engagement Table, announced that she is running for this seat in the June 8, 2021 Democratic Primary. Shin defeated Samirah in the June 2021 primary and in the November 2, 2021 general election, Republican Julie Perry, with 65.4% of the vote.

== District officeholders ==
Years	Delegate	Party	Electoral history
January 12, 1983 – September 30, 1997	George Heilig	Democratic	First elected in 1982 Died
January 1998 – January 9, 2002	Donald L. Williams	Democratic	First elected in 1997 Retired
January 9, 2002 – January 13, 2016	Tom Rust	Republican	First elected in 2001 Retired
January 13, 2016 – January 11, 2019	Jennifer Boysko	Democratic	First elected in 2015 Elected State Senator on January 8, 2019
February 20, 2019 – January 12, 2022	Ibraheem Samirah	Democratic	Elected on February 19, 2019, special election Lost renomination in 2021
January 12, 2022 – January 14, 2026	Irene Shin	Democratic	First elected in 2021
January 14, 2026 – present	Virgil Thornton	Democratic	First elected in 2025
