= Greg Habeeb =

US politician

Member of the Virginia House of Delegates from the 8th district
- In office January 12, 2011 – August 31, 2018
- Preceded by: Morgan Griffith
- Succeeded by: Joe McNamara

Personal details
- Born: June 15, 1976 (age 50) Syracuse, New York
- Party: Republican
- Spouse: Christy Habeeb
- Children: Daniel, William, Anna
- Education: Wake Forest University
- Profession: Lawyer
- Committees: Courts of Justice; Transportation; Commerce and Labor; Rules
- Website: www.greghabeeb.com

Gregory D. Habeeb (born June 15, 1976) is a lawyer and American politician in Southwest Virginia. He is a conservative Republican and was a member of the Virginia House of Delegates representing the 8th district, which includes the City of Salem, Craig County, and parts of Roanoke and Montgomery Counties from January 2011 to August 31, 2018.

== Education ==
Habeeb was born in Syracuse, New York and was raised in Christiansburg, Virginia. He attended Christiansburg High School and was an active member in the YMCA's Model General Assembly Program. He served as Youth Governor and remained interested in politics.

Habeeb attended Wake Forest University in North Carolina, earning an undergraduate degree in 1998. He earned his Juris Doctor degree from the Wake Forest University School of Law in 2001. While at Wake Forest, he met his future wife, Christy.

== Family ==
Greg and Christy Habeeb have three children and live in Salem, Virginia. He is a partner at Gentry, Locke, Rakes & Moore, a business law firm in Roanoke, Virginia. Habeeb and his family attend the Restoration Church in Salem. Habeeb is a volunteer with Young Life, a youth ministry, and formerly served on the board of directors of Big Brothers Big Sisters of Southwest Virginia. He volunteers at the Military Family Support Center in Salem. Habeeb is of Lebanese descent.

== Political career ==
Habeeb got his start in politics during college as an intern for then Governor George Allen and subsequently for then Senator John Warner (R-VA). After practicing law in Richmond, Virginia from 2001 to 2004, Habeeb moved back to the Roanoke Valley.

In 2007 he was elected Chairman of the Salem Republican Committee. During his tenure, the Salem Republican Committee grew from about 10 members to over 120 members. His work as Salem Republican Committee Chair was recognized by the Republican Party of Virginia which named him its statewide Unit Chair of the Year in 2007 and the 6th District Unit Chair of the Year in 2008. During this time, Habeeb also worked closely with then Delegate Morgan Griffith, who was the House Majority Leader. In November 2010, Griffith was elected to Congress in Virginia's 9th Congressional District, defeating long-time incumbent Rick Boucher. Griffith resigned from the House of Delegates in December. Habeeb, initially uninterested, reconsidered after receiving calls from many community members and several prominent party officials.

On July 27, 2018, he announced that he would resign from the House of Delegates effective August 31, 2018, citing a desire to spend more time with his family.

== Electoral history ==
Date	Election	Candidate	Party	Votes	%
Virginia House of Delegates, 8th district
January 11, 2011	Special	Gregory D. Habeeb	Republican	6,570	63.52
January 11, 2011	Special	Ginger R. Mumpower	Democratic	3,747	36.22
January 11, 2011	Special	Write Ins		26	0.25
January 11, 2011	Special	Morgan Griffith was elected to the U.S. House of Representatives; seat stayed Republican			
November 8, 2011	General	Gregory D. Habeeb	Republican	14,882	96.54
November 8, 2011	General	Write Ins		533	3.45
November 8, 2013	General	Gregory D. Habeeb	Republican	20,058	95.63
November 8, 2013	General	Write Ins		916	4.37
November 3, 2015	General	Gregory D. Habeeb	Republican	16,684	95.96
November 3, 2015	General	Write Ins		702	4.04
November 7, 2017	General	Gregory D. Habeeb	Republican	18,311	63.89
November 7, 2017	General	Steve G. McBride	Democratic	10,294	35.92
November 7, 2017	General	Write Ins		54	0.19

=== 2011 special election ===
Habeeb announced his candidacy for the Republican nomination for the 8th District seat in the Virginia House of Delegates on November 7, 2010. His candidacy was supported by, among others, Congressman-elect Griffith, 6th District Congressman Bob Goodlatte and Virginia State Senator Ralph Smith.

Habeeb was also endorsed during his primary by Governor Bob McDonnell, Lieutenant Governor Bill Bolling and Attorney General Ken Cuccinelli. Due in part to the overwhelming level of support he received by party leaders and Republican voters, Habeeb ultimately won the Republican nomination without opposition. McDonnell set the date for the special election as January 11, 2011 - giving candidates just under two months to campaign. Habeeb's opponent was Democrat Ginger Mumpower, a business owner from Roanoke County. Habeeb defeated Mumpower by a margin of 64% to 36%, winning every precinct in the District.

=== 2011 re-election ===
Habeeb announced in April 2011 his intention to seek a full term in the House of Delegates. Habeeb went unchallenged for the Republican nomination and eventually won re-election without opposition.

=== 2013 re-election ===
In 2013, Habeeb went unchallenged for the Republican nomination and eventually won re-election to a second full term without opposition.

=== 2015 re-election ===
In 2015, Habeeb went unchallenged for the Republican nomination and eventually won re-election to a third full term without opposition.

=== 2017 re-election ===
In 2017, Habeeb went unchallenged for the Republican nomination and eventually won re-election to a fourth full term, defeating Democrat Steve McBride, a teacher and scientist who works at Virginia Tech. Habeeb defeated McBride with a margin of 64% to 36%.

=== Member of the Virginia General Assembly ===
Habeeb was sworn-in as a member of the Virginia General Assembly just over 14 hours after thanking his supporters on Election night.

During his first session, Habeeb sponsored several pieces of legislation aimed at reducing the size of government, making it more efficient, transparent and accountable.

He was initially assigned to three committees: House Courts of Justice, House Transportation and House Militia, Police, and Public Safety.

After serving just half a term in the House, Habeeb was appointed to the influential House Committee on Commerce & Labor. In addition, he currently also serves on the Courts of Justice and Privileges and Elections committee. Habeeb was also appointed to the important Rules committee, which is in charge of determining under what rule a bill will be considered under.

Habeeb announced that he would resign his House of Delegates seat on July 27, 2018. He resigned in order to be a full-time dad and take a more significant role at the Gentry Locke law firm.
