= Virginia's 62nd House of Delegates district =

Virginia legislative district

District map from the 2023 election

Virginia's 62nd House of Delegates district elects one of 100 seats in the Virginia House of Delegates, the lower house of Virginia's bicameral state legislature. District 62 represents parts of Chesterfield, Henrico, and Prince George counties as well as part of the city of Hopewell. The seat is currently held by Republican Karen Hamilton.

== Electoral history ==
=== 2017 ===
In the November 2017 election, Democrat Sheila Bynum-Coleman ran against Republican Riley Ingram, a 12-term incumbent. It was the first time in 20 years he had faced a challenger.

=== 2019 ===
In the 2019 election, Democrat Lindsey Dougherty challenged Republican Carrie Coyner, who ran to replace the retiring Ingram. Coyner won with 55.1% of the vote.
