= 2024 United States House of Representatives elections in Virginia =

- November 5, 2024

All 11 Virginia seats to the United States House of Representatives
	Majority party	Minority party
Party	Democratic	Republican
Last election	6	5
Seats won	6	5
Seats after	Steady	Steady
Popular vote	2,274,922	2,108,450
Percentage	51.40%	47.64%
Swing	▼0.19%	▼0.33%

Democratic
40–50%
50–60%
60–70%
70–80%
80–90%
Republican
40–50%
50–60%
60–70%
70–80%
80–90%

The 2024 United States House of Representatives elections in Virginia were held on November 5, 2024, to elect the U.S. representatives from the U.S. Commonwealth of Virginia, one from each of the state's eleven congressional districts. The elections coincided with the 2024 U.S. presidential election, other elections to the House of Representatives, elections to the United States Senate, and various state and local elections. The primary elections took place on June 18, 2024.

== Statewide results ==
Party	Candidates	Votes		Seats		
Party	Candidates	No.	%	No.	+/–	%
Democratic Party	11	2,274,922	51.40%	6	Steady	54.55%
Republican Party	11	2,108,450	47.64%	5	Steady	45.45%
Independent	4	30,789	0.70%	0	Steady	0.0%
Write-in	11	11,601	0.26%	0	Steady	0.0%
Total	37	4,425,762	100%	11	Steady	100%

=== District ===
District	Democratic		Republican		Others		Total		Result
District	Votes	%	Votes	%	Votes	%	Votes	%	Result
District 1	208,445	43.53%	269,657	56.31%	804	0.17%	478,906	100.00%	Republican hold
District 2	191,666	46.90%	207,368	50.74%	9,668	2.37%	408,702	100.00%	Republican hold
District 3	219,926	69.95%	93,801	29.84%	670	0.21%	314,397	100.00%	Democratic hold
District 4	252,885	67.34%	121,814	32.44%	809	0.22%	375,508	100.00%	Democratic hold
District 5	184,229	42.27%	249,564	57.26%	2,046	0.47%	435,839	100.00%	Republican hold
District 6	141,612	34.79%	256,933	63.12%	8,490	2.09%	407,035	100.00%	Republican hold
District 7	203,336	51.18%	192,847	48.54%	1,116	0.28%	397,299	100.00%	Democratic hold
District 8	274,593	71.52%	94,676	24.66%	14,646	3.81%	383,915	100.00%	Democratic hold
District 9	109,570	27.33%	290,645	72.49%	748	0.19%	400,963	100.00%	Republican hold
District 10	215,131	52.09%	196,343	47.54%	1,538	0.37%	413,012	100.00%	Democratic hold
District 11	273,529	66.68%	134,802	32.86%	1,855	0.45%	410,186	100.00%	Democratic hold
Total	2,274,922	51.40%	2,108,450	47.64%	42,390	0.96%	4,425,762	100.00%	

Statewide popular vote
Democratic	51.40%
Republican	47.64%
Other	0.96%

House seats
Democratic	54.55%
Republican	45.45%

=== County and independent city ===
Locality	Democratic		Republican		Others		Margin		Total
Locality	#	%	#	%	#	%	#	%	Total
Accomack	7,044	41.07%	9,795	57.11%	312	1.82%	-2,751	-16.04%	17,151
Albemarle	42,699	64.56%	23,210	35.09%	230	0.35%	19,489	29.47%	66,139
Alexandria	59,657	75.07%	16,692	21.01%	3,117	3.92%	42,965	54.07%	79,466
Alleghany	1,900	23.54%	5,980	74.07%	193	2.39%	-4,080	-50.54%	8,073
Amelia	2,009	25.71%	5,755	73.66%	49	0.63%	-3,746	-47.95%	7,813
Amherst	5,535	32.18%	11,609	67.50%	55	0.32%	-6,074	-35.32%	17,199
Appomattox	2,206	23.33%	7,147	75.60%	101	1.07%	-4,941	-52.26%	9,454
Arlington	96,185	75.35%	26,659	20.89%	4,801	3.76%	69,526	54.47%	127,645
Augusta	10,211	23.10%	33,267	75.27%	717	1.51%	-23,056	-52.17%	44,195
Bath	541	21.25%	1,962	77.06%	43	1.69%	-1,421	-55.81%	2,546
Bedford	11,770	23.40%	38,377	76.31%	143	0.28%	-26,607	-52.91%	50,290
Bland	511	14.71%	2,961	85.23%	2	0.06%	-2,450	-70.52%	3,474
Botetourt	5,163	23.93%	16,039	74.35%	371	1.72%	-10,876	-50.41%	21,573
Bristol	2,127	29.11%	5,169	70.73%	12	0.16%	-3,042	-41.63%	7,308
Brunswick	4,215	55.28%	3,406	44.67%	4	0.05%	809	10.61%	7,625
Buchanan	1,471	16.19%	7,598	83.61%	18	0.20%	-6,127	-67.43%	9,087
Buckingham	2,841	36.81%	4,843	62.75%	34	0.44%	-2,002	-25.94%	7,718
Buena Vista	690	24.43%	2,060	72.95%	74	2.62%	-1,370	-48.51%	2,824
Campbell	7,642	24.71%	23,042	74.51%	241	0.78%	-15,400	-49.80%	30,925
Caroline	7,688	44.50%	9,562	55.34%	28	0.16%	-1,874	-10.85%	17,278
Carroll	2,879	18.13%	12,984	81.78%	14	0.09%	-10,105	-63.65%	15,877
Charles City	2,420	56.82%	1,836	43.11%	3	0.07%	584	13.71%	4,259
Charlotte	1,911	32.17%	4,009	67.49%	20	0.34%	-2,098	-35.32%	5,940
Charlottesville	19,041	82.92%	3,815	16.61%	106	0.46%	15,226	66.31%	22,962
Chesapeake	64,516	51.09%	59,978	47.50%	1,787	1.42%	4,538	3.59%	126,281
Chesterfield	110,372	53.39%	95,945	46.41%	416	0.20%	14,427	6.98%	206,733
Clarke	3,787	39.30%	5,639	58.52%	210	2.18%	-1,852	-19.22%	9,636
Colonial Heights	3,087	36.08%	5,458	63.80%	10	0.12%	-2,371	-27.71%	8,555
Covington	703	29.06%	1,656	68.46%	60	2.48%	-953	-39.40%	2,419
Craig	514	16.70%	2,557	83.07%	7	0.23%	-2,043	-66.37%	3,078
Culpeper	10,526	37.36%	17,602	62.47%	47	0.17%	-7,076	-25.11%	28,175
Cumberland	1,945	36.55%	3,350	62.95%	27	0.51%	-1,405	-26.40%	5,322
Danville	10,137	59.37%	6,896	40.39%	42	0.25%	3,241	18.98%	17,075
Dickenson	1,555	22.66%	5,294	77.16%	12	0.17%	-3,739	-54.50%	6,861
Dinwiddie	6,055	39.42%	9,273	60.38%	31	0.20%	-3,218	-20.95%	15,359
Emporia	1,413	67.16%	684	32.51%	7	0.33%	729	34.65%	2,104
Essex	2,510	41.85%	3,477	57.97%	11	0.18%	-967	-16.12%	5,998
Fairfax City	8,804	66.18%	4,434	33.33%	66	0.50%	4,370	32.85%	13,304
Fairfax County	382,726	66.31%	186,198	32.26%	8,289	1.44%	196,528	34.05%	577,213
Falls Church	6,988	78.25%	1,677	18.78%	265	2.97%	5,311	59.47%	8,930
Fauquier	16,073	36.69%	27,662	63.15%	70	0.16%	-11,589	-26.46%	43,805
Floyd	2,957	30.84%	6,618	69.03%	12	0.13%	-3,661	-38.19%	9,587
Fluvanna	7,438	45.08%	8,983	54.44%	80	0.48%	-1,545	-9.36%	16,501
Franklin City	2,181	57.23%	1,525	40.02%	105	2.76%	656	17.21%	3,811
Franklin County	7,906	25.96%	22,506	73.91%	40	0.13%	-14,600	-47.94%	30,452
Frederick	16,963	33.03%	33,057	64.36%	1,341	2.61%	-16,094	-31.34%	51,361
Fredericksburg	8,719	65.11%	4,636	34.62%	37	0.28%	4,083	30.49%	13,392
Galax	738	27.48%	1,942	72.30%	6	0.22%	-1,204	-44.83%	2,686
Giles	1,964	21.59%	7,119	78.25%	15	0.16%	-5,155	-56.66%	9,098
Gloucester	6,107	26.74%	16,695	73.09%	39	0.17%	-10,588	-46.36%	22,841
Goochland	7,267	37.40%	12,068	62.11%	95	0.49%	-4,801	-24.71%	19,430
Grayson	1,525	19.15%	6,426	80.68%	14	0.18%	-4,901	-61.53%	7,965
Greene	4,509	37.80%	7,397	62.01%	23	0.19%	-2,888	-24.21%	11,929
Greensville	2,289	56.03%	1,787	43.75%	9	0.22%	502	12.29%	4,085
Halifax	6,780	38.42%	10,799	61.19%	70	0.40%	-4,019	-22.77%	17,649
Hampton	44,868	73.19%	16,335	26.65%	97	0.16%	28,533	46.55%	61,300
Hanover	24,297	33.51%	48,071	66.29%	149	0.21%	-23,774	-32.78%	72,517
Harrisonburg	9,865	58.90%	6,415	38.30%	470	2.81%	3,450	20.60%	16,750
Henrico	112,355	62.88%	65,984	36.93%	335	0.19%	46,371	25.95%	178,674
Henry	7,975	32.03%	16,871	67.76%	52	0.21%	-8,896	-35.73%	24,898
Highland	390	25.74%	1,104	72.87%	21	1.39%	-714	-47.13%	1,515
Hopewell	5,079	58.46%	3,592	41.34%	17	0.20%	1,487	17.12%	8,688
Isle of Wight	9,099	37.27%	14,781	60.54%	535	2.19%	-5,682	-23.27%	24,415
James City	24,239	47.71%	26,471	52.11%	91	0.18%	-2,232	-4.39%	50,801
King and Queen	1,363	33.00%	2,761	66.85%	6	0.15%	-1,398	-33.85%	4,130
King George	5,586	36.57%	9,662	63.26%	25	0.16%	-4,076	-26.69%	15,273
King William	3,093	27.33%	8,194	72.41%	29	0.26%	-5,101	-45.08%	11,316
Lancaster	2,984	41.34%	4,227	58.55%	8	0.11%	-1,243	-17.22%	7,219
Lee	1,456	14.81%	8,357	85.00%	19	0.19%	-6,901	-70.19%	9,832
Lexington	1,671	58.88%	1,097	38.65%	70	2.47%	574	20.23%	2,838
Loudoun	127,234	56.02%	98,857	43.53%	1,027	0.45%	28,377	12.49%	227,118
Louisa	8,265	34.85%	15,322	64.61%	126	0.53%	-7,057	-29.76%	23,713
Lunenburg	2,104	36.74%	3,609	63.02%	14	0.24%	-1,505	-26.28%	5,727
Lynchburg	16,500	45.28%	19,693	54.04%	250	0.69%	-3,193	-8.76%	36,443
Madison	2,659	31.77%	5,703	68.14%	8	0.10%	-3,044	-36.37%	8,370
Manassas	8,741	55.51%	6,961	44.21%	44	0.28%	1,780	11.30%	15,746
Manassas Park	3,432	59.37%	2,311	39.98%	38	0.66%	1,121	19.39%	5,781
Martinsville	3,219	58.61%	2,261	41.17%	12	0.22%	958	17.44%	5,492
Mathews	1,523	25.91%	4,348	73.96%	8	0.14%	-2,825	-48.05%	5,879
Mecklenburg	5,887	37.43%	9,794	62.27%	48	0.31%	-3,907	-24.84%	15,729
Middlesex	2,258	33.05%	4,566	66.82%	9	0.13%	-2,308	-33.78%	6,833
Montgomery	22,983	49.38%	23,423	50.32%	139	0.30%	-440	-0.95%	46,545
Nelson	4,189	44.99%	5,079	54.55%	43	0.46%	-890	-9.56%	9,311
New Kent	5,140	30.98%	11,432	68.90%	19	0.11%	-6,292	-37.92%	16,591
Newport News	50,150	67.57%	23,929	32.24%	144	0.19%	26,221	35.33%	74,223
Norfolk	61,429	72.69%	22,874	27.07%	206	0.24%	38,555	45.62%	84,509
Northampton	3,386	49.72%	3,333	48.94%	91	1.34%	53	0.78%	6,810
Northumberland	2,805	34.43%	5,319	65.29%	23	0.28%	-2,514	-30.86%	8,147
Norton	428	26.87%	1,164	73.07%	1	0.06%	-736	-46.20%	1,593
Nottoway	2,495	37.21%	4,190	62.49%	20	0.30%	-1,695	-25.28%	6,705
Orange	8,257	37.49%	13,700	62.21%	66	0.30%	-5,443	-24.72%	22,023
Page	2,698	20.79%	10,029	77.27%	252	1.94%	-7,331	-56.48%	12,979
Patrick	1,829	19.39%	7,595	80.51%	10	0.11%	-5,766	-61.12%	9,434
Petersburg	11,160	87.36%	1,582	12.38%	33	0.26%	9,578	74.97%	12,775
Pittsylvania	9,237	27.78%	23,902	71.90%	106	0.32%	-14,665	-44.11%	33,245
Poquoson	1,790	22.52%	6,146	77.32%	13	0.16%	-4,356	-54.80%	7,949
Portsmouth	29,137	72.27%	11,111	27.56%	67	0.17%	18,026	44.71%	40,315
Powhatan	5,352	25.85%	15,278	73.78%	78	0.38%	-9,926	-47.93%	20,708
Prince Edward	4,296	47.10%	4,781	52.42%	44	0.48%	-485	-5.32%	9,121
Prince George	6,941	40.38%	10,235	59.54%	13	0.08%	-3,294	-19.16%	17,189
Prince William	130,533	58.38%	92,173	41.23%	869	0.39%	38,360	17.16%	223,575
Pulaski	4,568	26.15%	12,877	73.71%	24	0.14%	-8,309	-47.56%	17,469
Radford	3,102	48.20%	3,320	51.58%	14	0.22%	-218	-3.39%	6,436
Rappahannock	1,958	39.66%	2,964	60.04%	15	0.30%	-1,006	-20.38%	4,937
Richmond City	88,376	83.33%	17,394	16.40%	291	0.27%	70,982	66.93%	106,061
Richmond County	1,192	29.11%	2,902	70.87%	1	0.02%	-1,710	-41.76%	4,095
Roanoke City	23,679	57.22%	16,642	40.22%	1,059	2.56%	7,037	17.01%	41,380
Roanoke County	20,020	35.47%	35,800	63.42%	625	1.11%	-15,780	-27.96%	56,445
Rockbridge	3,928	30.82%	8,639	67.79%	176	1.38%	-4,711	-36.97%	12,743
Rockingham	13,781	28.45%	33,912	70.00%	752	1.55%	-20,131	-41.55%	48,445
Russell	2,564	19.30%	10,696	80.51%	25	0.19%	-8,132	-61.21%	13,285
Salem	4,636	35.85%	7,975	61.68%	319	2.47%	-3,339	-25.82%	12,930
Scott	1,743	16.06%	9,089	83.73%	23	0.21%	-7,346	-67.67%	10,855
Shenandoah	6,287	26.01%	17,462	72.23%	426	1.76%	-11,175	-46.23%	24,175
Smyth	2,776	19.51%	11,425	80.29%	28	0.20%	-8,649	-60.78%	14,229
Southampton	3,551	36.78%	5,978	61.92%	126	1.31%	-2,427	-25.14%	9,655
Spotsylvania	35,407	45.20%	42,775	54.61%	147	0.19%	-7,368	-9.41%	78,329
Stafford	40,897	49.82%	41,019	49.97%	173	0.21%	-122	-0.15%	82,089
Staunton	7,046	52.76%	6,002	44.95%	306	2.29%	1,044	7.82%	13,354
Suffolk	28,918	54.88%	22,310	42.34%	1,467	2.78%	6,608	12.54%	52,695
Surry	2,176	50.43%	2,131	49.39%	8	0.19%	45	1.04%	4,315
Sussex	2,502	52.83%	2,227	47.02%	7	0.15%	275	5.81%	4,736
Tazewell	3,191	16.50%	16,113	83.34%	30	0.16%	-12,922	-66.84%	19,334
Virginia Beach	108,936	48.28%	111,293	49.33%	5,403	2.39%	-2,357	-1.04%	225,632
Warren	6,391	28.66%	15,430	69.20%	477	2.14%	-9,039	-40.54%	22,298
Washington	6,761	23.18%	22,354	76.63%	58	0.20%	-15,593	-53.45%	29,173
Waynesboro	4,846	43.81%	5,954	53.82%	262	2.37%	-1,108	-10.02%	11,062
Westmoreland	3,916	37.61%	6,484	62.27%	13	0.12%	-2,568	-24.66%	10,413
Williamsburg	5,282	68.33%	2,438	31.54%	10	0.13%	2,844	36.79%	7,730
Winchester	6,076	52.18%	5,250	45.09%	318	2.73%	826	7.09%	11,644
Wise	3,247	19.83%	13,082	79.90%	44	0.27%	-9,835	-60.07%	16,373
Wythe	2,990	19.63%	12,208	80.16%	31	0.20%	-9,218	-60.53%	15,229
York	16,392	42.01%	22,568	57.84%	56	0.14%	-6,176	-15.83%	39,016
Totals	2,274,922	51.40%	2,108,450	47.64%	42,390	0.96%	166,472	3.76%	4,425,762

=== Counties and independent cities that flipped from Democratic to Republican ===
- Montgomery (largest city: Blacksburg)
- Virginia Beach (independent city)

=== Counties and independent cities that flipped from Republican to Democratic ===
- Sussex (largest city: Waverly)

== District 1 ==
2024 Virginia's 1st congressional district election
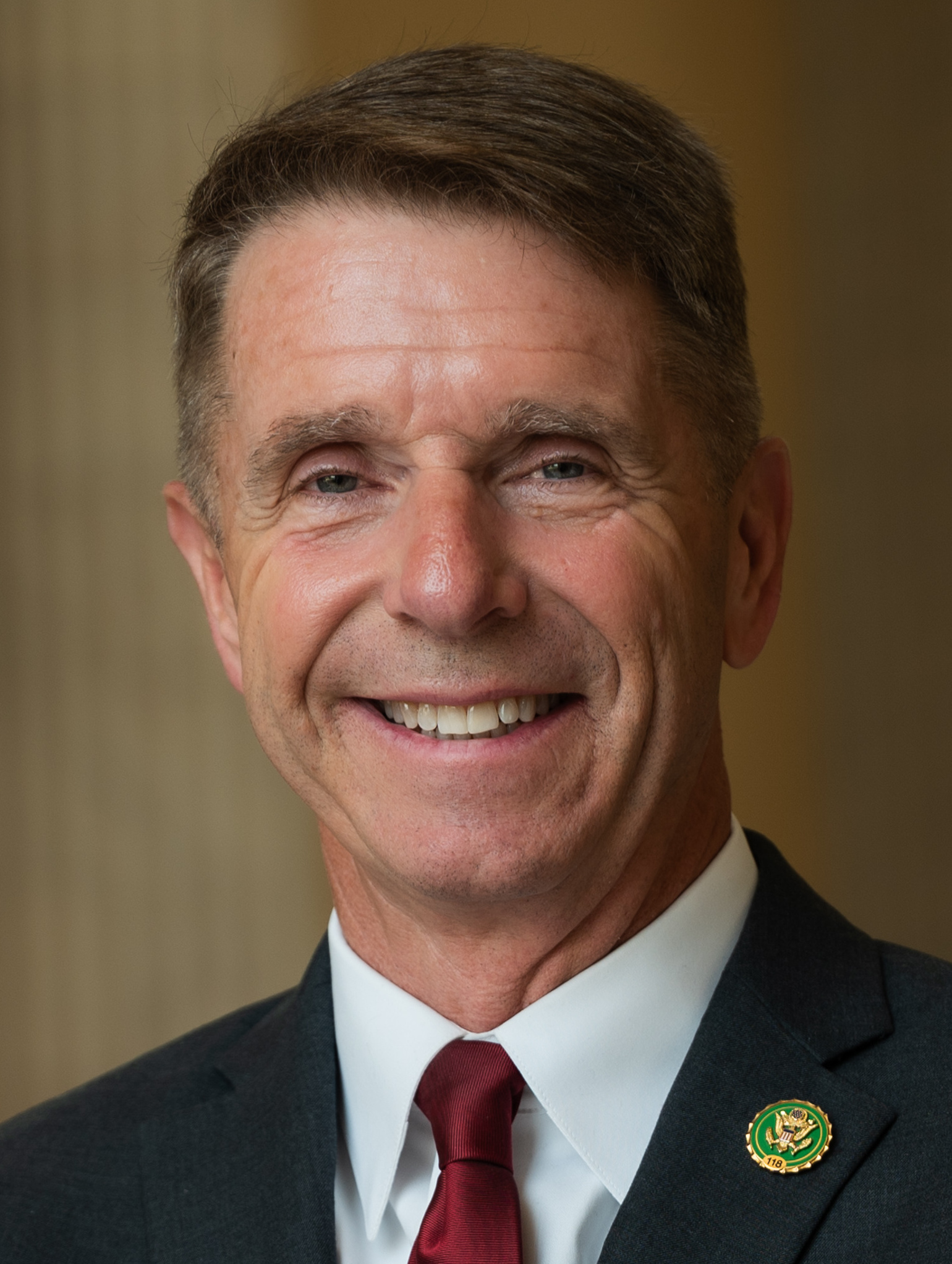

Nominee	Rob Wittman	Leslie Mehta
Party	Republican	Democratic
Popular vote	269,657	208,445
Percentage	56.3%	43.5%
- Wittman: 50–60% 60–70% 70–80% 80–90% Mehta: 40–50% 50–60% 60–70% 70–80% 80–90%
U.S. Representative before election
Rob Wittman
Republican
Elected U.S. Representative
Rob Wittman
Republican

The 1st district is based in the western Chesapeake Bay and includes portions of suburban Richmond. Within the district are western Henrico and Chesterfield counties. Other localities in the district include Colonial Beach, Mechanicsville, and Williamsburg. The incumbent was Republican Rob Wittman, who was reelected with 56.02% of the vote in 2022.

=== Republican primary ===
==== Nominee ====
- Rob Wittman, incumbent U.S. representative

==== Endorsements ====
Rob Wittman

Organizations

- AIPAC

==== Fundraising ====
Campaign finance reports as of May 29, 2024
Candidate	Raised	Spent	Cash on hand
Rob Wittman (R)	$1,921,592	$815,049	$1,642,933
Source: Federal Election Commission

=== Democratic primary ===
==== Nominee ====
- Leslie Mehta, civil rights attorney

==== Eliminated in primary ====
- Herb Jones, former New Kent County treasurer and nominee for this district in 2022

==== Endorsements ====
Leslie Mehta

U.S. representatives

- Abigail Spanberger, U.S. representative from Virginia's 7th congressional district (2019–2025)

Organizations

- AAPI Victory Fund
- National Women's Political Caucus

==== Fundraising ====
Campaign finance reports as of May 29, 2024
Candidate	Raised	Spent	Cash on hand
Herb Jones (D)	$140,867	$155,271	$266,278
Leslie Mehta (D)	$188,035	$122,651	$65,383
Source: Federal Election Commission

==== Results ====
Primary results by county and independent city: Mehta: 50–60%; 60–70%; 70–80%; 80–90%; Jones: 50–60%; 60–70%

Democratic primary results
Party	Candidate	Votes	%
Democratic	Leslie Mehta	15,253	66.6
Democratic	Herb Jones	7,653	33.4
Total votes		22,906	100.0

=== General election ===
==== Predictions ====
Source	Ranking	As of
The Cook Political Report	Solid R	March 21, 2024
Inside Elections	Solid R	May 5, 2023
Sabato's Crystal Ball	Safe R	November 13, 2023
Elections Daily	Safe R	November 4, 2024
CNalysis	Solid R	November 4, 2024
Decision Desk HQ	Safe R	October 22, 2024

==== Results ====
2024 Virginia's 1st congressional district election
Party	Candidate	Votes	%
Republican	Rob Wittman (incumbent)	269,657	56.3
Democratic	Leslie Mehta	208,445	43.5
Write-in		804	0.2
Total votes		478,906	100.0
Republican hold			

==== By county and independent city ====
Locality	Rob Wittman Republican		Leslie Mehta Democratic		Write-in Various		Margin		Total votes cast
Locality	#	%	#	%	#	%	#	%	Total votes cast
Chesterfield (part)	55,182	51.59%	51,591	48.23%	193	0.18%	3,591	3.36%	106,966
Essex	3,477	57.97%	2,510	41.85%	11	0.18%	967	16.12%	5,998
Gloucester	16,695	73.09%	6,107	26.74%	39	0.17%	10,588	46.36%	22,841
Hanover (part)	39,836	65.74%	20,673	34.11%	91	0.15%	19,163	31.62%	60,600
Henrico (part)	46,611	45.53%	55,587	54.29%	184	0.18%	-8,976	-8.77%	102,382
James City	26,471	52.11%	24,239	47.71%	91	0.18%	2,232	4.39%	50,801
King and Queen	2,761	66.85%	1,363	33.00%	6	0.15%	1,398	33.85%	4,130
King William	8,194	72.41%	3,093	27.33%	29	0.26%	5,101	45.08%	11,316
Lancaster	4,227	58.55%	2,984	41.34%	8	0.11%	1,243	17.22%	7,219
Mathews	4,348	73.96%	1,523	25.91%	8	0.14%	2,825	48.05%	5,879
Middlesex	4,566	66.82%	2,258	33.05%	9	0.13%	2,308	33.78%	6,833
New Kent	11,432	68.90%	5,140	30.98%	19	0.11%	6,292	37.92%	16,591
Northumberland	5,319	65.29%	2,805	34.43%	23	0.28%	2,514	30.86%	8,147
Poquoson	6,146	77.32%	1,790	22.52%	13	0.16%	4,356	54.80%	7,949
Richmond County	2,902	70.87%	1,192	29.11%	1	0.02%	1,710	41.76%	4,095
Westmoreland	6,484	62.27%	3,916	37.61%	13	0.12%	2,568	24.66%	10,413
Williamsburg	2,438	31.54%	5,282	68.33%	10	0.13%	-2,844	-36.79%	7,730
York	22,568	57.84%	16,392	42.01%	56	0.14%	6,176	15.83%	39,016
Totals	269,657	56.31%	208,445	43.53%	804	0.17%	61,212	12.78%	478,906

== District 2 ==
2024 Virginia's 2nd congressional district election
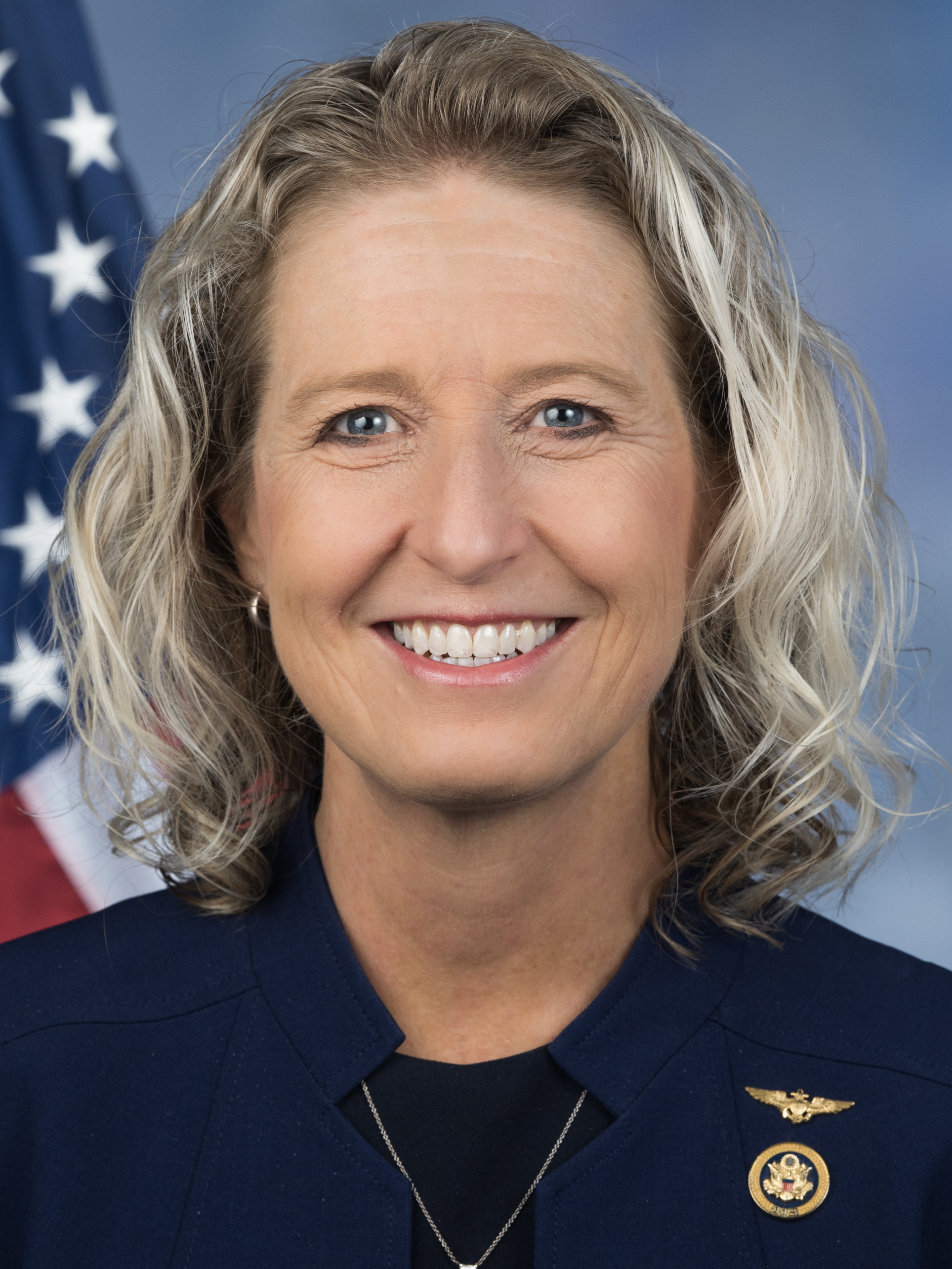

Nominee	Jen Kiggans	Missy Cotter Smasal
Party	Republican	Democratic
Popular vote	207,368	191,666
Percentage	50.7%	46.9%
- County and independent city results Kiggans: 40–50% 50–60% 60–70% Smasal: 40–50% 50–60%
U.S. Representative before election
Jen Kiggans
Republican
Elected U.S. Representative
Jen Kiggans
Republican

The 2nd district is based in Hampton Roads, containing the cities of Chesapeake, Franklin, Suffolk, and Virginia Beach. Virginia's Eastern Shore is also located within the district. The incumbent was Republican Jen Kiggans, who flipped the district and was elected to a first term with 52% of the vote in 2022. She won re-election, defeating Democrat Missy Cotter Smasal 51%–47%.

=== Republican primary ===
==== Nominee ====
- Jen Kiggans, incumbent U.S. representative

==== Endorsements ====
Jen Kiggans

Organizations

- AIPAC
- Americans for Prosperity
- Log Cabin Republicans PAC
- Maggie's List

==== Fundraising ====
Campaign finance reports as of May 29, 2024
Candidate	Raised	Spent	Cash on hand
Jen Kiggans (R)	$3,493,371	$1,672,733	$1,846,148
Source: Federal Election Commission

=== Democratic primary ===
==== Nominee ====
- Missy Cotter Smasal, nonprofit executive and nominee for SD-08 in 2019

==== Eliminated in primary ====
- Jake Denton, attorney

==== Endorsements ====
Missy Cotter Smasal

U.S. representatives

- Hakeem Jeffries, House minority leader (2023–present) from NY-08 (2013–present)
- 6 other U.S. representatives (Note: Lois Frankel, FL-22 (2013–present); Jennifer McClellan, VA-04 (2023–present); Seth Moulton, MA-06 (2015–present); Bobby Scott, VA-03 (1993–present); Abigail Spanberger, VA-07 (2019–2025); Jennifer Wexton, VA-10 (2019–2025))

Statewide officials

- Ralph Northam, former governor of Virginia (2018–2022)

State legislators

- Louise Lucas, president pro tempore of the Virginia Senate (2020–present) from SD-18 (1992–present)

Organizations

- DCCC Red to Blue
- EMILY's List
- Everytown for Gun Safety
- Jewish Democratic Council of America
- League of Conservation Voters
- National Organization for Women PAC
- National Women's Political Caucus
- Planned Parenthood Action Fund
- Reproductive Freedom for All
- Vote Common Good
- Vote Mama
- VoteVets

==== Fundraising ====
Campaign finance reports as of May 29, 2024
Candidate	Raised	Spent	Cash on hand
Jake Denton (D)	$314,352	$231,311	$83,040
Missy Cotter Smasal (D)	$771,411	$403,751	$367,660
Source: Federal Election Commission

==== Results ====
Democratic primary results
Party	Candidate	Votes	%
Democratic	Missy Cotter Smasal	20,480	70.1
Democratic	Jake Denton	8,732	29.9
Total votes		29,212	100.0

=== Independents ===
==== Declared ====
- Robert Reid Jr., solar energy contractor

=== General election ===
==== Polling ====
Poll source	Date(s) administered	Sample size (Note: Key: A – all adults RV – registered voters LV – likely voters V – unclear)	Margin of error	Jen Kiggans (R)	Missy Cotter Smasal (D)	Undecided
DCCC Analytics (D)	October 19–20, 2024	373 (LV)	± 5.1%	47%	47%	6% (Note: Reid (I) with 1%)
Christopher Newport University	October 11–20, 2024	800 (LV)	± 3.9%	46%	45%	8%
Christopher Newport University	September 6–10, 2024	792 (LV)	± 4.7%	45%	40%	14%
Impact Research (D) (Note: Poll sponsored by House Majority PAC, a Democratic group)	August 20–25, 2024	500 (LV)	–	48%	47%	5%
DCCC Analytics (D)	May 28–30, 2024	420 (LV)	± 4.9%	48%	44%	9%

==== Post-primary endorsements ====
Missy Cotter Smasal (D)

Organizations

- CASA in Action
- Patriotic Millionaires

==== Debates ====
2024 Virginia's 2nd congressional district election debate
No.	Date	Host	Moderator	Link	Republican	Democratic
Key: P Participant A Absent N Not invited I Invited W Withdrawn						
Key: P Participant A Absent N Not invited I Invited W Withdrawn					Kiggans	Smasal
1	October 11, 2024	Hampton Roads Chamber	Chris Saxman	3-WTKR	P	P

==== Predictions ====
Source	Ranking	As of
The Cook Political Report	Lean R	March 21, 2024
Inside Elections	Tilt R	July 28, 2023
Sabato's Crystal Ball	Lean R	November 13, 2023
Elections Daily	Lean R	November 4, 2024
CNalysis	Lean R	October 21, 2024
Decision Desk HQ	Lean R	October 22, 2024

==== Results ====
2024 Virginia's 2nd congressional district election
Party	Candidate	Votes	%
Republican	Jen Kiggans (incumbent)	207,368	50.7
Democratic	Missy Cotter Smasal	191,666	46.9
Independent	Robert Reid Jr.	9,197	2.3
Write-in		471	0.1
Total votes		408,702	100.0
Republican hold			

==== By county and independent city ====
Locality	Jen Kiggans Republican		Missy Cotter Smasal Democratic		Various candidates Other parties		Margin		Total votes cast
Locality	#	%	#	%	#	%	#	%	Total votes cast
Accomack	9,795	57.11%	7,044	41.07%	312	1.82%	2,751	16.04%	17,151
Chesapeake (part)	40,426	55.97%	30,174	41.77%	1,631	2.26%	10,252	14.19%	72,231
Franklin City	1,525	40.02%	2,181	57.23%	105	2.76%	-656	-17.21%	3,811
Isle of Wight	14,781	60.54%	9,099	37.27%	535	2.19%	5,682	23.27%	24,415
Northampton	3,333	48.94%	3,386	49.72%	91	1.34%	-53	-0.78%	6,810
Southampton (part)	3,905	65.55%	1,928	32.37%	124	2.08%	1,977	33.19%	5,957
Suffolk	22,310	42.34%	28,918	54.88%	1,467	2.78%	-6,608	-12.54%	52,695
Virginia Beach	111,293	49.33%	108,936	48.28%	5,403	2.39%	2,357	1.04%	225,632
Totals	207,368	50.74%	191,666	46.90%	9,668	2.37%	15,702	3.84%	408,702

== District 3 ==
2024 Virginia's 3rd congressional district election
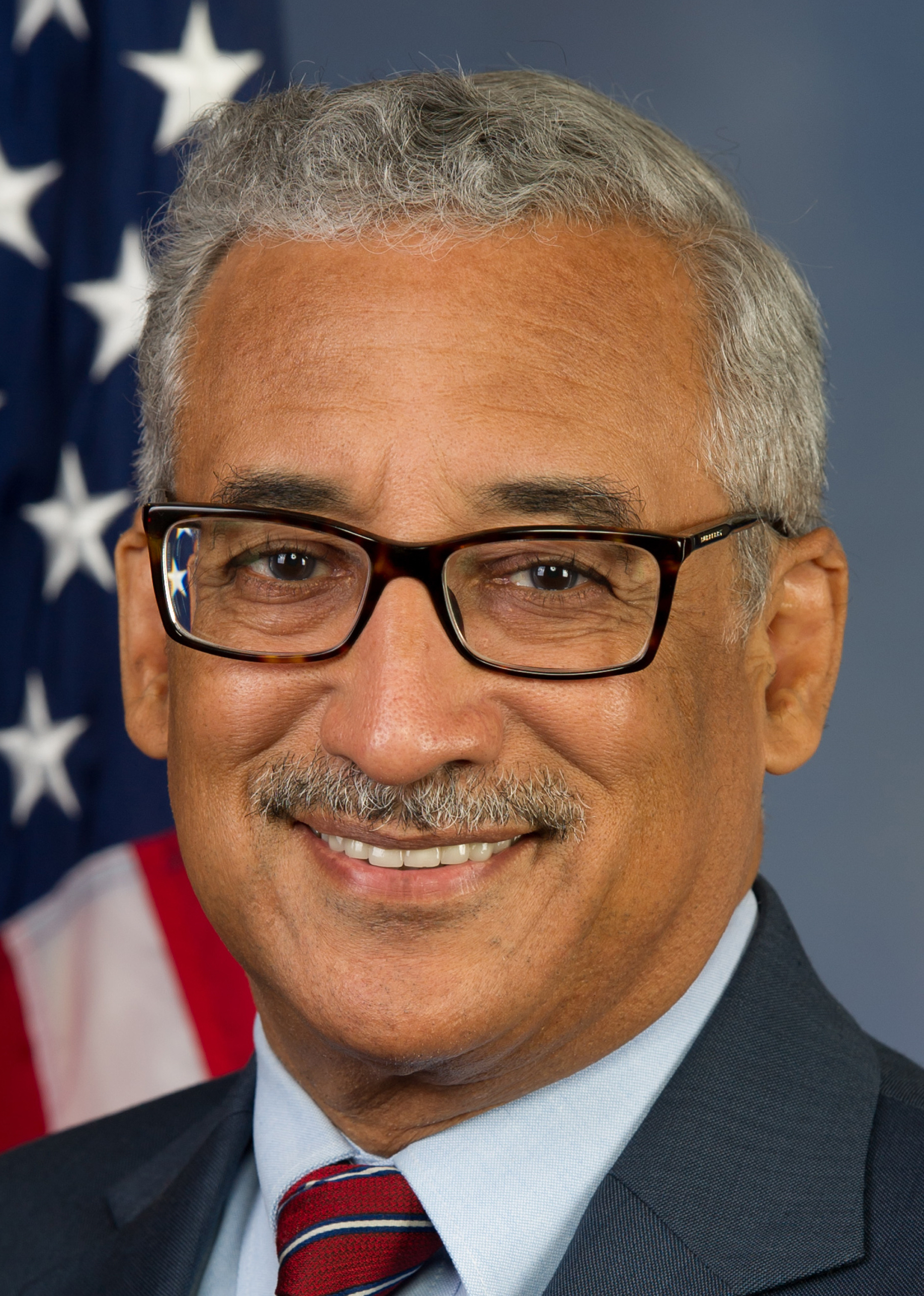

Nominee	Bobby Scott	John Sitka III
Party	Democratic	Republican
Popular vote	219,926	93,801
Percentage	70.0%	29.8%
- County and independent city results Scott: 60–70% 70–80%
U.S. Representative before election
Bobby Scott
Democratic
Elected U.S. Representative
Bobby Scott
Democratic

The 3rd district encompasses the inner Hampton Roads, including parts of Hampton and Norfolk, as well as Newport News. The incumbent was Democrat Bobby Scott, who was re-elected with 67.36% of the vote in 2022.

=== Democratic primary ===
==== Nominee ====
- Bobby Scott, incumbent U.S. representative

==== Endorsements ====
Bobby Scott

Organizations

- Humane Society Legislative Fund
- Planned Parenthood Action Fund
- Population Connection Action Fund
- Sierra Club

Labor unions

- National Education Association

==== Fundraising ====
Campaign finance reports as of May 29, 2024
Candidate	Raised	Spent	Cash on hand
Bobby Scott (D)	$530,683	$427,427	$295,592
Source: Federal Election Commission

=== Republican nomination ===
==== Nominee ====
- John Sitka III, retired consultant and nominee for HD-93 in 2023

=== Independents ===
==== Declared ====
- Rhoda Taylor-Young, journalist

=== General election ===
==== Predictions ====
Source	Ranking	As of
The Cook Political Report	Solid D	March 21, 2024
Inside Elections	Solid D	July 28, 2023
Sabato's Crystal Ball	Safe D	November 13, 2023
Elections Daily	Safe D	June 8, 2023
CNalysis	Solid D	November 16, 2023
Decision Desk HQ	Safe D	October 7, 2024

==== Results ====
2024 Virginia's 3rd congressional district election
Party	Candidate	Votes	%
Democratic	Bobby Scott (incumbent)	219,926	70.0
Republican	John Sitka III	93,801	29.8
Write-in		670	0.2
Total votes		314,397	100.0
Democratic hold			

==== By county and independent city ====
Locality	Bobby Scott Democratic		John Sitka III Republican		Write-in Various		Margin		Total votes cast
Locality	#	%	#	%	#	%	#	%	Total votes cast
Chesapeake (part)	34,342	63.54%	19,552	36.17%	156	0.29%	14,790	27.36%	54,050
Hampton	44,868	73.19%	16,335	26.65%	97	0.16%	28,533	46.55%	61,300
Newport News	50,150	67.57%	23,929	32.24%	144	0.19%	26,221	35.33%	74,223
Norfolk	61,429	72.69%	22,874	27.07%	206	0.24%	38,555	45.62%	84,509
Portsmouth	29,137	72.27%	11,111	27.56%	67	0.17%	18,026	44.71%	40,315
Totals	219,926	69.95%	93,801	29.84%	670	0.21%	126,125	40.12%	314,397

== District 4 ==
2024 Virginia's 4th congressional district election
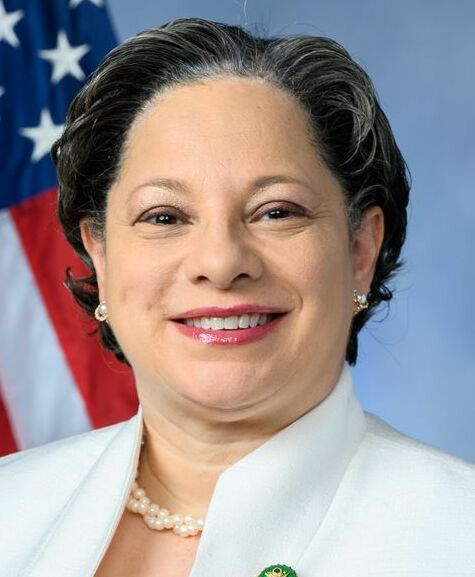

Nominee	Jennifer McClellan	Bill Moher
Party	Democratic	Republican
Popular vote	252,885	121,814
Percentage	67.3%	32.4%
- McClellan: 50–60% 60–70% 70–80% 80–90% >90% Moher: 50–60% 60–70% 70–80% 80–90% Tie: 40–50%
U.S. Representative before election
Jennifer McClellan
Democratic
Elected U.S. Representative
Jennifer McClellan
Democratic

The 4th district takes in the city of Richmond and portions of Southside Virginia following Interstate 95. Within the district are the cities of Colonial Heights, Emporia, Hopewell, and Petersburg. The incumbent was Democrat Jennifer McClellan, who was elected with 74.41% of the vote in a 2023 special election after the previous incumbent, Donald McEachin, died.

=== Democratic primary ===
==== Nominee ====
- Jennifer McClellan, incumbent U.S. representative

==== Endorsements ====
Jennifer McClellan

Organizations

- AIPAC
- Democratic Majority for Israel
- Feminist Majority PAC
- Giffords
- Humane Society Legislative Fund
- Jewish Democratic Council of America
- National Women's Political Caucus
- Planned Parenthood Action Fund
- Population Connection Action Fund
- Sierra Club
- Vote Mama

Labor unions

- National Education Association

==== Fundraising ====
Campaign finance reports as of May 29, 2024
Candidate	Raised	Spent	Cash on hand
Jennifer McClellan (D)	$2,207,275	$2,036,304	$170,970
Source: Federal Election Commission

=== Republican primary ===
==== Nominee ====
- Bill Moher, businessman

==== Fundraising ====
Campaign finance reports as of May 29, 2024
Candidate	Raised	Spent	Cash on hand
William Moher (R)	$396,990 (Note: $380,000 of this total was self-funded by Moher.)	$368,049	$28,941
Source: Federal Election Commission

=== General election ===
==== Predictions ====
Source	Ranking	As of
The Cook Political Report	Solid D	March 21, 2024
Inside Elections	Solid D	July 28, 2023
Sabato's Crystal Ball	Safe D	November 13, 2023
Elections Daily	Safe D	June 8, 2023
CNalysis	Solid D	November 16, 2023
Decision Desk HQ	Safe D	October 22, 2024

==== Results ====
2024 Virginia's 4th congressional district election
Party	Candidate	Votes	%
Democratic	Jennifer McClellan (incumbent)	252,885	67.3
Republican	Bill Moher	121,814	32.4
Write-in		809	0.2
Total votes		375,508	100.0
Democratic hold			

==== By county and independent city ====
Locality	Jennifer McClellan Democratic		Bill Moher Republican		Write-in Various		Margin		Total votes cast
Locality	#	%	#	%	#	%	#	%	Total votes cast
Brunswick	4,215	55.28%	3,406	44.67%	4	0.05%	809	10.61%	7,625
Charles City	2,420	56.82%	1,836	43.11%	3	0.07%	584	13.71%	4,259
Chesterfield (part)	58,781	58.92%	40,763	40.86%	223	0.22%	18,018	18.06%	99,767
Colonial Heights	3,087	36.08%	5,458	63.80%	10	0.12%	-2,371	-27.71%	8,555
Dinwiddie	6,055	39.42%	9,273	60.38%	31	0.20%	-3,218	-20.95%	15,359
Emporia	1,413	67.16%	684	32.51%	7	0.33%	729	34.65%	2,104
Greensville	2,289	56.03%	1,787	43.75%	9	0.22%	502	12.29%	4,085
Henrico (part)	56,768	74.41%	19,373	25.39%	151	0.20%	37,395	49.02%	76,292
Hopewell	5,079	58.46%	3,592	41.34%	17	0.20%	1,487	17.12%	8,688
Petersburg	11,160	87.36%	1,582	12.38%	33	0.26%	9,578	74.97%	12,775
Prince George	6,941	40.38%	10,235	59.54%	13	0.08%	-3,294	-19.16%	17,189
Richmond City	88,376	83.33%	17,394	16.40%	291	0.27%	70,982	66.93%	106,061
Southampton (part)	1,623	43.89%	2,073	56.06%	2	0.05%	-450	-12.17%	3,698
Surry	2,176	50.43%	2,131	49.39%	8	0.19%	45	1.04%	4,315
Sussex	2,502	52.83%	2,227	47.02%	7	0.15%	275	5.81%	4,736
Totals	252,885	67.34%	121,814	32.44%	809	0.22%	131,071	34.90%	375,508

== District 5 ==
2024 Virginia's 5th congressional district election
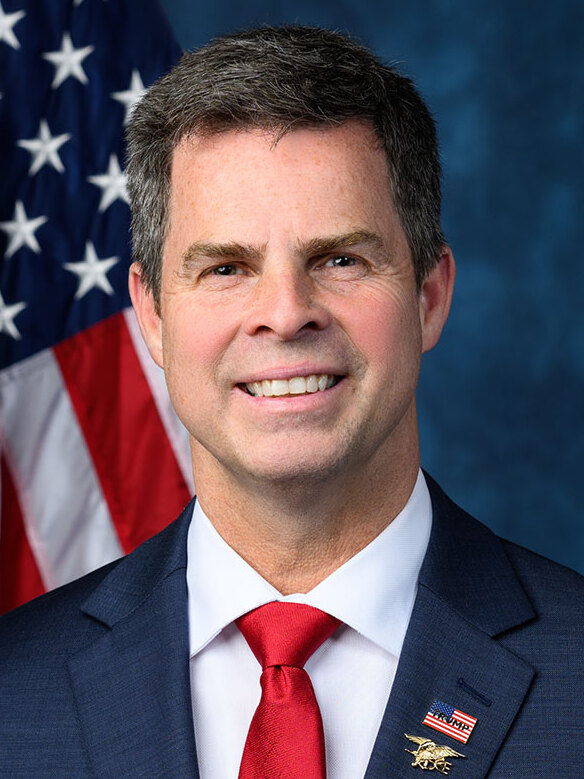

Nominee	John McGuire	Gloria Witt
Party	Republican	Democratic
Popular vote	249,564	184,229
Percentage	57.3%	42.3%
- McGuire: 40–50% 50–60% 60–70% 70–80% 80–90% >90% Witt: 50–60% 60–70% 70–80% 80–90%
U.S. Representative before election
Bob Good
Republican
Elected U.S. Representative
John McGuire
Republican

The 5th district encompasses the majority of Southside Virginia, including the cities of Charlottesville, Danville, and Lynchburg. The incumbent was Republican Bob Good, who was reelected with 57.68% of the vote in 2022.

=== Republican primary ===
Good was considered to be vulnerable in his primary, as he had received criticism for being one of eight Republicans who voted to oust Kevin McCarthy as speaker of the House. He also faced backlash from Donald Trump and his supporters for endorsing Ron DeSantis in the 2024 Republican presidential primaries.

==== Nominee ====
- John McGuire, state senator from the 10th district (2024–present) and candidate for the 7th district in 2020 and 2022

==== Eliminated in primary ====
- Bob Good, incumbent U.S. representative

==== Withdrawn ====
- Gary Barve, Liberty University graduate student and former intern for incumbent Bob Good (running for U.S. House in Florida)

==== Endorsements ====
Bob Good

Executive branch officials

- Steve Bannon, former senior counselor to the president (2017) and former White House Chief Strategist (2017)
- Ken Cuccinelli, former deputy secretary of Homeland Security (2019–2021) and former Virginia attorney general (2010–2014)
- Mark Meadows, former White House chief of staff (2020–2021), former U.S. representative from North Carolina's 11th congressional district (2013–2020)

U.S. senators

- Rand Paul, U.S. senator from Kentucky

U.S. representatives

- Andy Biggs, U.S. representative from Arizona's 5th congressional district
- Dave Brat, former U.S. representative from Virginia's 7th congressional district (2014-2019)
- Tim Burchett, U.S. representative from Tennessee's 2nd congressional district
- Ben Cline, U.S. representative from Virginia's 6th congressional district
- Andrew Clyde, U.S. representative from Georgia's 9th congressional district
- Matt Gaetz, U.S. representative from Florida's 1st congressional district
- Jody Hice, former U.S. representative from Georgia's 10th congressional district (2015–2023)
- Chip Roy, U.S. representative from Texas's 21st congressional district

State legislators

- Nick Freitas, state delegate from the 62nd district
- Tim Griffin, state delegate from the 53rd district
- Vance Wilkins, former speaker of the Virginia House of Delegates (2000–2002)

Organizations

- Club for Growth PAC
- Eagle Forum
- Gun Owners of America
- House Freedom Fund
- National Rifle Association of America Political Victory Fund
- Turning Point Action
John McGuire

Executive branch officials

- Donald Trump, former president of the United States (2017–2021)

U.S. representatives

- Don Bacon, U.S. representative from Nebraska's 2nd congressional district (2017–present)
- Warren Davidson, U.S. representative from Ohio's 8th congressional district (2016–present)
- Marjorie Taylor Greene, U.S. representative from Georgia's 14th congressional district (2021–present)
- Jen Kiggans, U.S. representative from Virginia's 2nd congressional district (2023–present)
- Morgan Luttrell, U.S. representative from Texas's 8th congressional district (2023–present)
- Mike Rogers, U.S. representative from Alabama's 3rd congressional district (2003–present)
- Austin Scott, U.S. representative from Georgia's 8th congressional district (2011–present)
- Derrick Van Orden, U.S. representative from Wisconsin's 3rd congressional district (2023–present)
- Ryan Zinke, U.S. representative from Montana's 1st congressional district (2023–present), Montana's at-large congressional district (2015–2017), 52nd US secretary of the interior (2017–2019)

Individuals

- Billy Kidd, Buckingham County sheriff

Organizations

- Republican Jewish Coalition
- Republican Main Street Partnership PAC

==== Fundraising ====
Campaign finance reports as of May 29, 2024
Candidate	Raised	Spent	Cash on hand
Bob Good (R)	$1,146,806	$993,332	$167,832
John McGuire (R)	$1,236,509	$671,211	$565,297
Source: Federal Election Commission

==== Polling ====
Poll source	Date(s) administered	Sample size	Margin of error	Bob Good	John McGuire	Undecided
WPA Intelligence (Note: Poll sponsored by the Virginia Faith and Freedom Coalition)	June 2–4, 2024	300 (LV)	± 5.6%	31%	41%	28%
Neighborhood Research and Media (Note: Poll sponsored by Champions of Freedom PAC, which supported Good)	June 2024	301 (LV)	–	39%	30%	31%
Battleground Connect (R) (Note: Poll sponsored by McGuire's campaign)	April 30 – May 2, 2024	504 (LV)	± 4.4%	31%	45%	24%
Battleground Connect (R)	November 30 – December 2, 2023	971 (LV)	± 3.2%	46%	24%	30%

==== Results ====
Results by county and independent city McGuire: 50–60%; 60–70%; Good: 50–60%

Results by precinct McGuire: 50–60%; 60–70% 70–80%; Good: 50–60% 60–70% 70–80%; Tie

Republican primary results
Party	Candidate	Votes	%
Republican	John McGuire	31,583	50.3
Republican	Bob Good (incumbent)	31,209	49.7
Total votes		62,792	100.0

=== Democratic primary ===
==== Nominee ====
- Gloria Witt, executive coach

==== Eliminated in primary ====
- Paul Riley, defense contractor
- Gary Terry, nonprofit executive

==== Fundraising ====
Campaign finance reports as of May 29, 2024
Candidate	Raised	Spent	Cash on hand
Gary Terry (D)	$13,465	$9,049	$3,663
Gloria Witt (D)	$20,198	$14,750	$5,447
Source: Federal Election Commission

==== Debate ====
2024 Virginia's 5th congressional district Democratic primary debate
No.	Date	Host	Moderator	Link	Democratic	Democratic	Democratic
Key: P Participant A Absent N Not invited I Invited W Withdrawn							
Key: P Participant A Absent N Not invited I Invited W Withdrawn					Riley	Terry	Witt
1	May 2, 2024	Danville Democratic Committee; Virginia Democrats	Peter Howard	TBD	P	P	P

==== Results ====
Democratic primary results by county and independent city: Witt: 40–50%; 50–60%; 60–70%; 70–80%; 80–90%

Democratic primary results
Party	Candidate	Votes	%
Democratic	Gloria Witt	14,188	57.2
Democratic	Gary Terry	5,566	22.4
Democratic	Paul Riley	5,063	20.4
Total votes		24,817	100.0

=== General election ===
==== Debates ====
2024 Virginia's 5th congressional district debate
No.	Date	Host	Moderator	Link	Republican	Democratic
Key: P Participant A Absent N Not invited I Invited W Withdrawn						
Key: P Participant A Absent N Not invited I Invited W Withdrawn					McGuire	Witt
1	October 17, 2024	H-SC	Richard Pantele	YouTube	P	P

==== Predictions ====
Source	Ranking	As of
The Cook Political Report	Solid R	March 21, 2024
Inside Elections	Solid R	July 28, 2023
Sabato's Crystal Ball	Safe R	November 13, 2023
Elections Daily	Safe R	June 8, 2023
CNalysis	Solid R	November 16, 2023
Decision Desk HQ	Safe R	October 22, 2024

==== Post-primary endorsements ====
Glorida Witt (D)

Representatives

- Denver Riggleman, former Republican U.S. representative for this district (2019–2021) (Independent)

==== Results ====
2024 Virginia's 5th congressional district election
Party	Candidate	Votes	%
Republican	John McGuire	249,564	57.3
Democratic	Gloria Witt	184,229	42.3
Write-in		2,046	0.5
Total votes		435,839	100.0
Republican hold			

==== By county and independent city ====
Locality	John McGuire Republican		Gloria Witt Democratic		Write-in Various		Margin		Total votes cast
Locality	#	%	#	%	#	%	#	%	Total votes cast
Albemarle (part)	23,186	35.07%	42,689	64.58%	230	0.35%	-19,503	-29.50%	66,105
Amelia	5,755	73.66%	2,009	25.71%	49	0.63%	3,746	47.95%	7,813
Amherst	11,609	67.50%	5,535	32.18%	55	0.32%	6,074	35.32%	17,199
Appomattox	7,147	75.60%	2,206	23.33%	101	1.07%	4,941	52.26%	9,454
Bedford (part)	14,179	74.13%	4,839	25.30%	109	0.57%	9,340	48.83%	19,127
Buckingham	4,843	62.75%	2,841	36.81%	34	0.44%	2,002	25.94%	7,718
Campbell	23,042	74.51%	7,642	24.71%	241	0.78%	15,400	49.80%	30,925
Charlotte	4,009	67.49%	1,911	32.17%	20	0.34%	2,098	35.32%	5,940
Charlottesville	3,815	16.61%	19,041	82.92%	106	0.46%	-15,226	-66.31%	22,962
Cumberland	3,350	62.95%	1,945	36.55%	27	0.51%	1,405	26.40%	5,322
Danville	6,896	40.39%	10,137	59.37%	42	0.25%	-3,241	-18.98%	17,075
Fluvanna	8,983	54.44%	7,438	45.08%	80	0.48%	1,545	9.36%	16,501
Goochland	12,068	62.11%	7,267	37.40%	95	0.49%	4,801	24.71%	19,430
Halifax	10,799	61.19%	6,780	38.42%	70	0.40%	4,019	22.77%	17,649
Hanover (part)	8,235	69.10%	3,624	30.41%	58	0.49%	4,611	38.69%	11,917
Louisa	15,322	64.61%	8,265	34.85%	126	0.53%	7,057	29.76%	23,713
Lunenburg	3,609	63.02%	2,104	36.74%	14	0.24%	1,505	26.28%	5,727
Lynchburg	19,693	54.04%	16,500	45.28%	250	0.69%	3,193	8.76%	36,443
Mecklenburg	9,794	62.27%	5,887	37.43%	48	0.31%	3,907	24.84%	15,729
Nelson	5,079	54.55%	4,189	44.99%	43	0.46%	890	9.56%	9,311
Nottoway	4,190	62.49%	2,495	37.21%	20	0.30%	1,695	25.28%	6,705
Pittsylvania	23,902	71.90%	9,237	27.78%	106	0.32%	14,665	44.11%	33,245
Powhatan	15,278	73.78%	5,352	25.85%	78	0.38%	9,926	47.93%	20,708
Prince Edward	4,781	52.42%	4,296	47.10%	44	0.48%	485	5.32%	9,121
Totals	249,564	57.26%	184,229	42.27%	2,046	0.47%	65,335	14.99%	435,839

== District 6 ==
2024 Virginia's 6th congressional district election
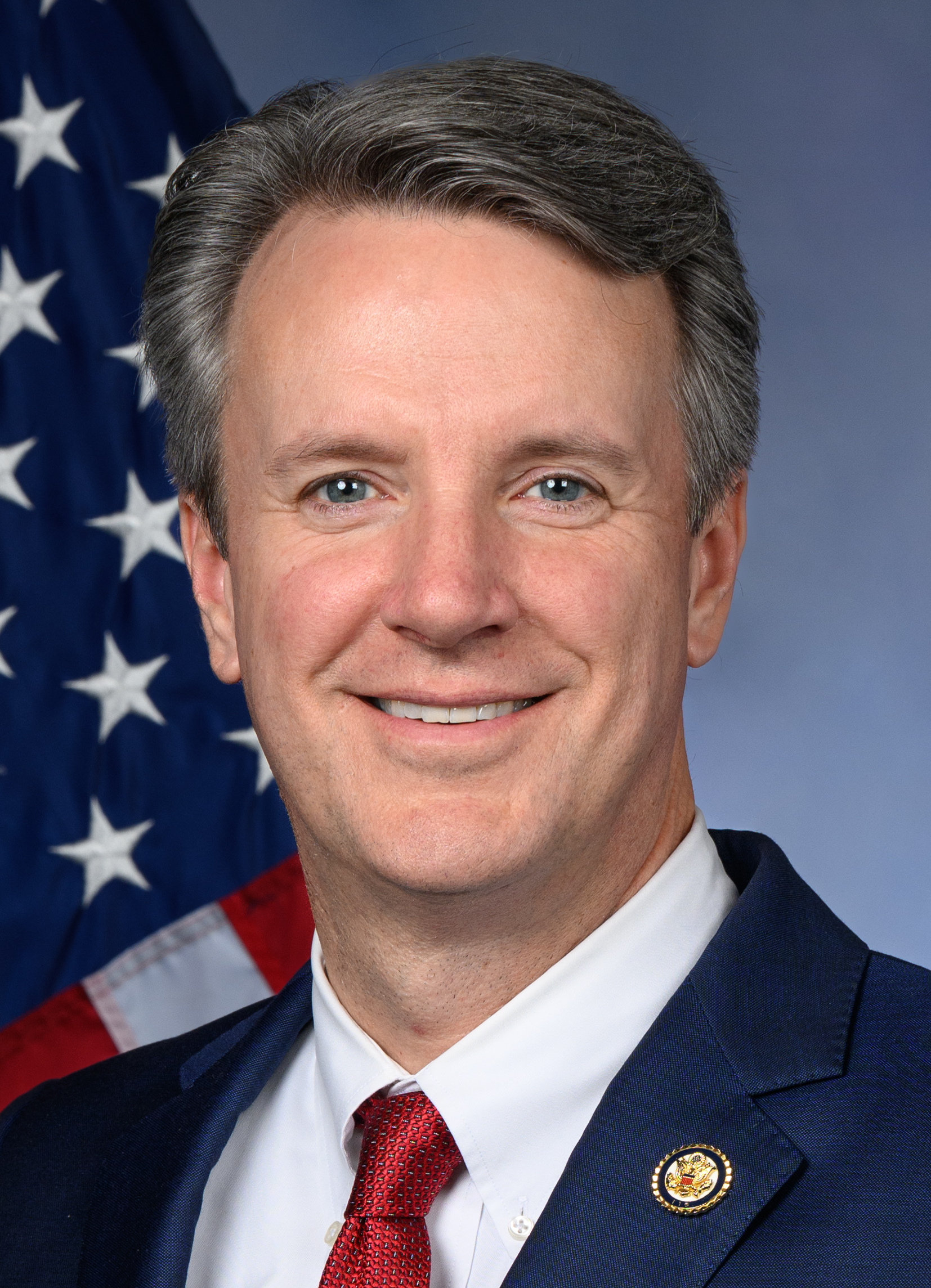

Nominee	Ben Cline	Ken Mitchell
Party	Republican	Democratic
Popular vote	256,933	141,612
Percentage	63.1%	34.8%
- County and independent city results Cline: 50–60% 60–70% 70–80% Mitchell: 50–60%
U.S. Representative before election
Ben Cline
Republican
Elected U.S. Representative
Ben Cline
Republican

The 6th district is located in western Virginia taking in the Shenandoah Valley along Interstate 81. The district is anchored at the southern end by the cities of Roanoke and Salem. The incumbent was Republican Ben Cline, who was re-elected with 64.50% of the vote in 2022.

=== Republican primary ===
==== Nominee ====
- Ben Cline, incumbent U.S. representative

==== Endorsements ====
Ben Cline

Organizations

- AIPAC
- Pro-Israel America

==== Fundraising ====
Campaign finance reports as of May 29, 2024
Candidate	Raised	Spent	Cash on hand
Ben Cline (R)	$587,685	$447,117	$407,909
Source: Federal Election Commission

=== Democratic primary ===
==== Nominee ====
- Ken Mitchell, farmer

==== Withdrawn ====
- Rod Grandon, independent integrity monitor and former U.S. Air Force Senior Executive Service member (endorsed Mitchell)

==== Declined ====
- Jade Harris, former vice mayor of Glasgow, nominee for HD-24 in the 2023 special election, and nominee for SD-3 in 2023

==== Fundraising ====
Campaign finance reports as of May 29, 2024
Candidate	Raised	Spent	Cash on hand
Ken Mitchell (D)	$28,233	$26,358	$1,874
Source: Federal Election Commission

=== Independents ===
==== Declared ====
- Robby Wells, former college football coach and perennial candidate

=== General election ===
==== Predictions ====
Source	Ranking	As of
The Cook Political Report	Solid R	March 21, 2024
Inside Elections	Solid R	July 28, 2023
Sabato's Crystal Ball	Safe R	November 13, 2023
Elections Daily	Safe R	June 8, 2023
CNalysis	Solid R	November 16, 2023
Decision Desk HQ	Safe R	October 22, 2024

==== Results ====
2024 Virginia's 6th congressional district election
Party	Candidate	Votes	%
Republican	Ben Cline (incumbent)	256,933	63.1
Democratic	Ken Mitchell	141,612	34.8
Independent	Robby Wells	7,980	2.0
Write-in		510	0.1
Total votes		407,035	100.0
Republican hold			

==== By county and independent city ====
Locality	Ben Cline Republican		Ken Mitchell Democratic		Various candidates Other parties		Margin		Total votes cast
Locality	#	%	#	%	#	%	#	%	Total votes cast
Alleghany	5,980	74.07%	1,900	23.54%	193	2.39%	4,080	50.54%	8,073
Augusta	33,267	75.27%	10,211	23.10%	717	1.51%	23,056	52.17%	44,195
Bath	1,962	77.06%	541	21.25%	43	1.69%	1,421	55.81%	2,546
Bedford (part)	2	33.33%	4	66.67%	0	0.00%	-2	-33.33%	6
Botetourt	16,039	74.35%	5,163	23.93%	371	1.72%	10,876	50.41%	21,573
Buena Vista	2,060	72.95%	690	24.43%	74	2.62%	1,370	48.51%	2,824
Clarke	5,639	58.52%	3,787	39.30%	210	2.18%	1,852	19.22%	9,636
Covington	1,656	68.46%	703	29.06%	60	2.48%	953	39.40%	2,419
Frederick	33,057	64.36%	16,963	33.03%	1,341	2.61%	16,094	31.34%	51,361
Harrisonburg	6,415	38.30%	9,865	58.90%	470	2.81%	-3,450	-20.60%	16,750
Highland	1,104	72.87%	390	25.74%	21	1.39%	714	47.13%	1,515
Lexington	1,097	38.65%	1,671	58.88%	70	2.47%	-574	-20.23%	2,838
Page	10,029	77.27%	2,698	20.79%	252	1.94%	7,331	56.48%	12,979
Roanoke City	16,642	40.22%	23,679	57.22%	1,059	2.56%	-7,037	-17.01%	41,380
Roanoke County (part)	21,360	66.15%	10,356	32.07%	573	1.77%	11,004	34.08%	32,289
Rockbridge	8,639	67.79%	3,928	30.82%	176	1.38%	4,711	36.97%	12,743
Rockingham	33,912	70.00%	13,781	28.45%	752	1.55%	20,131	41.55%	48,445
Salem	7,975	61.68%	4,636	35.85%	319	2.47%	3,339	25.82%	12,930
Shenandoah	17,462	72.23%	6,287	26.01%	426	1.76%	11,175	46.23%	24,175
Staunton	6,002	44.95%	7,046	52.76%	306	2.29%	-1,044	-7.82%	13,354
Warren	15,430	69.20%	6,391	28.66%	477	2.14%	9,039	40.54%	22,298
Waynesboro	5,954	53.82%	4,846	43.81%	262	2.37%	1,108	10.02%	11,062
Winchester	5,250	45.09%	6,076	52.18%	318	2.73%	-826	-7.09%	11,644
Totals	256,933	63.12%	141,612	34.79%	8,490	2.09%	115,321	28.33%	407,035

== District 7 ==
2024 Virginia's 7th congressional district election
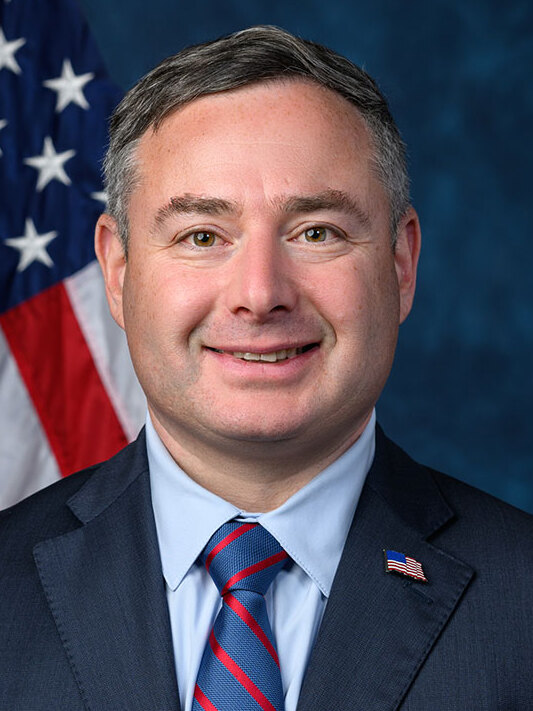

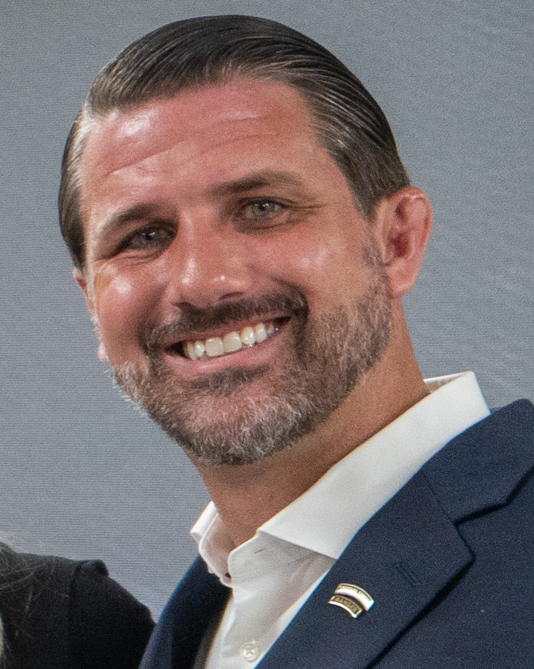
Nominee	Eugene Vindman	Derrick Anderson
Party	Democratic	Republican
Popular vote	203,336	192,847
Percentage	51.2%	48.5%
- Vindman: 50–60% 60–70% 70–80% 80–90% Anderson: 40–50% 50–60% 60–70% 70–80%
U.S. Representative before election
Abigail Spanberger
Democratic
Elected U.S. Representative
Eugene Vindman
Democratic

The 7th district is based in Northern Virginia and encompasses suburban and exurban areas of Washington, as well as rural areas of the Piedmont. The district contains Bowling Green, Culpeper, the city of Fredericksburg, Stafford, Stanardsville, Woodbridge, and a small sliver of Albemarle County. The incumbent was Democrat Abigail Spanberger, who was re-elected with 52.33% of the vote in 2022. Spanberger did not seek re-election, but would instead run for governor in 2025. Anderson was dogged through the campaign by B-roll footage he had shot with the wife and children of a family friend, giving the false impression that he was married with children, and leading to accusations that he was misleading voters with a "fake family". Vindman ultimately won the election by 10,489 votes.

=== Democratic primary ===
==== Nominee ====
- Eugene Vindman, former deputy legal advisor to the U.S. National Security Council (2018–2020)

==== Eliminated in primary ====
- Andrea Bailey, Prince William County supervisor (2019–present)
- Carl Bedell, attorney
- Margaret Franklin, Prince William County supervisor (2019–present)
- Elizabeth Guzmán, former state delegate from the 31st district (2018–2024), candidate for lieutenant governor in 2021, and candidate for SD-29 in 2023
- Cliff Heinzer, chair of the Stafford County Democratic Party
- Briana Sewell, state delegate from the 25th district (2022–present) and cousin of U.S. Representative Terri Sewell

==== Declined ====
- Joshua Cole, state delegate from the 65th district (2020–2022, 2024–present)
- Candi King, state delegate from the 2nd district (2021–present)
- Babur Lateef, chair of the Prince William County School Board (2018–present) (later ran for lieutenant governor in 2025)
- Ben Litchfield, attorney and candidate for SD-27 in 2023
- Michelle Maldonado, state delegate from the 50th district (2022–present) (ran in the 10th district)
- Jeremy McPike, state senator from the 29th district (2016–present)
- Danica Roem, state senator from the 30th district (2024–present)
- Abigail Spanberger, incumbent U.S. representative (later ran successfully for governor in 2025)
- Pamela Yeung, chair of the Stafford County Board of Supervisors

==== Endorsements ====
Andrea Bailey

Statewide officials

- Ralph Northam, former governor of Virginia (2018–2022)

State legislators

- Louise Lucas, president pro tempore of the Virginia Senate (2020–present) from the 18th district (1992–present) (co-endorsement with Franklin, Guzmán, and Sewell)
Margaret Franklin

U.S. representatives

- Alma Adams, U.S. representative from North Carolina's 11th congressional district (2014–present)
- Al Lawson, former U.S. representative from Florida's 5th congressional district (2017–2023)

State legislators

- Jennifer Carroll Foy, state senator from the 33rd district (2024–present)
- Louise Lucas, president pro tempore of the Virginia Senate (2020–present) from the 18th district (1992–present) (co-endorsement with Bailey, Guzmán, and Sewell)
Elizabeth Guzmán

State legislators

- Phil Hernandez, state delegate from the 94th district (2024–present)
- Louise Lucas, president pro tempore of the Virginia Senate (2020–present) from the 18th district (1992–present) (co-endorsement with Bailey, Franklin, and Sewell)
- Marty Martinez, state delegate from the 29th district (2024–present)

Labor unions

- Amalgamated Transit Union Local 689
- Teamsters Local 639
- Virginia AFL-CIO

Organizations

- CASA in Action
- Latino Victory Fund
- PODER PAC
- Vote Mama
Briana Sewell

U.S. representatives

- Jim Moran, former U.S. representative from Virginia's 8th congressional district (1991–2015)

State legislators

- Louise Lucas, president pro tempore of the Virginia Senate (2020–present) from the 18th district (1992–present) (co-endorsement with Bailey, Franklin, and Guzmán)
- 5 other state senators
- 8 state delegates
Eugene Vindman

U.S. representatives

- Jason Crow, U.S. representative from Colorado's 6th congressional district (2019–present)
- Don Davis, U.S. representative from North Carolina's 1st congressional district (2023–present)
- Chris Deluzio, U.S. representative from Pennsylvania's 17th congressional district (2023–present)
- Marcy Kaptur, U.S. representative from Ohio's 9th congressional district (1983–present)
- Seth Moulton, U.S. representative from Massachusetts's 6th congressional district (2015–present)
- Wiley Nickel, U.S. representative from North Carolina's 13th congressional district (2023–present)
- Pat Ryan, U.S. representative from New York's 19th congressional district (2022–present)
- Adam Schiff, U.S. representative from California's 30th congressional district (2001–present)

Individuals

- Wesley Clark, general and candidate for president of the United States in 2004
- Khizr Khan, activist
- VoteVets

Newspapers

- The Washington Post (Democratic primary only)

==== Polling ====
Poll source	Date(s) administered	Sample size	Margin of error	Andrea Bailey	Margaret Franklin	Elizabeth Guzmán	Brianna Sewell	Eugene Vindman	Undecided
Global Strategy Group (D) (Note: Poll sponsored by Vindman's campaign)	May 20–23, 2024	500 (LV)	± 4.4%	10%	3%	8%	4%	43%	32%

==== Fundraising ====
Campaign finance reports as of May 29, 2024
Candidate	Raised	Spent	Cash on hand
Andrea Bailey (D)	$338,772 (Note: $67,500 of this total was self-funded by Bailey.)	$238,739	$100,032
Carl Bedell (D)	$83,494 (Note: $14,500 of this total was self-funded by Bedell.)	$66,131	$17,362
Margaret Franklin (D)	$284,018 (Note: $2,500 of this total was self-funded by Franklin.)	$216,933	$67,084
Elizabeth Guzmán (D)	$286,206 (Note: $20,000 of this total was self-funded by Guzmán.)	$181,778	$104,427
Clifford Heinzer (D)	$67,210 (Note: $59,708 of this total was self-funded by Heinzer.)	$52,323	$14,909
Briana Sewell (D)	$246,690	$186,630	$60,060
Eugene Vindman (D)	$5,025,298	$4,149,246	$876,052
Source: Federal Election Commission

==== Results ====
Primary results by county and independent city: Vindman: 30–40%; 40–50%; 50–60%; 60–70%; 80–90%

Democratic primary results
Party	Candidate	Votes	%
Democratic	Eugene Vindman	17,263	49.3
Democratic	Elizabeth Guzmán	5,283	15.1
Democratic	Briana Sewell	4,706	13.4
Democratic	Andrea Bailey	4,381	12.5
Democratic	Margaret Franklin	2,034	5.8
Democratic	Carl Bedell	738	2.1
Democratic	Clifford Heinzer	621	1.8
Total votes		35,026	100.0

=== Republican primary ===
==== Nominee ====
- Derrick Anderson, attorney and candidate for this district in 2022

==== Eliminated in primary ====
- Cameron Hamilton, defense contractor
- Maria Martin, author and candidate for SD-29 in 2023
- Jon Myers, U.S. Marine Corps veteran
- John Prabhudoss, religious nonprofit executive
- Terris Todd, former Calhoun County, Michigan commissioner

==== Declined ====
- Yesli Vega, Prince William County supervisor and nominee for this district in 2022 (endorsed Hamilton)

==== Endorsements ====
Derrick Anderson

U.S. senators

- Tom Cotton, U.S. senator from Arkansas (2015–present)

U.S. representatives

- Mike Johnson, speaker of the United States House of Representatives (2023-present)
- Jen Kiggans, U.S. representative from VA-2 (2023–present)
- Brian Mast, U.S. representative from FL-21 (2017–present)
- Derrick Van Orden, U.S. representative from WI-3 (2023–present)
- Michael Waltz, U.S. representative from FL-6 (2019–2025)

Local officials

- David Decatur, Stafford County sheriff
- Steven Smith, Greene County sheriff

Organizations

- Congressional Leadership Fund

Newspapers

- The Washington Post (Republican primary only)
Cameron Hamilton

U.S. senators

- Rand Paul, U.S. senator from Kentucky (2011–present)

U.S. representatives

- Dave Brat, former U.S. representative from VA-7 (2014–2019)
- Byron Donalds, U.S. representative from FL-19 (2021-present)
- Bob Good, U.S. representative from VA-5 (2021–present)
- Mark Green, U.S. representative from TN-7 (2019–present)
- Thomas Massie, U.S. representative from KY-4 (2012–present)
- Scott Perry, U.S. representative from PA-10 (2013–present)

State legislators

- Nick Freitas, state delegate from the 62nd district (2016–present) and nominee for this district in 2020 (Hamilton's campaign chair)

Local officials

- Yesli Vega, Prince William County supervisor and nominee for this district in 2022

Organizations

- House Freedom Fund

==== Fundraising ====
Campaign finance reports as of May 29, 2024
Candidate	Raised	Spent	Cash on hand
Derrick Anderson (R)	$1,100,810	$682,539	$421,885
Cameron Hamilton (R)	$721,659 (Note: $10,000 of this total was self-funded by Hamilton.)	$544,057	$177,601
Maria Martin (R)	$16,774 (Note: $5,423 of this total was self-funded by Martin.)	$16,152	$622
Jon Myers (R)	$126,921 (Note: $51,000 of this total was self-funded by Myers.)	$100,486	$26,435
John Prabhudoss (R)	$141,655 (Note: $101,317 of this total was self-funded by Prabhudoss.)	$124,662	$16,992
Terris Todd (R)	$28,236 (Note: $16,110 of this total was self-funded by Martin.)	$17,183	$17,183
Source: Federal Election Commission

==== Results ====
Primary results by county and independent city: Anderson: 40–50%; 50–60%; Hamilton: 40–50%; 50–60%

Republican primary results
Party	Candidate	Votes	%
Republican	Derrick Anderson	16,338	45.2
Republican	Cameron Hamilton	13,448	37.2
Republican	Jon Myers	4,660	12.9
Republican	John Prabhudoss	729	2.0
Republican	Maria Martin	625	1.7
Republican	Terris Todd	373	1.0
Total votes		36,173	100.0

=== General election ===
==== Debates ====
2024 Virginia's 7th congressional district debate
No.	Date	Host	Moderator	Link	Democratic	Republican
Key: P Participant A Absent N Not invited I Invited W Withdrawn						
Key: P Participant A Absent N Not invited I Invited W Withdrawn					Vindman	Anderson
1	September 24, 2024	ABC-7			A	P
2	October 2, 2024	UMW	Stephen Farnsworth		P	P

==== Polling ====
Poll source	Date(s) administered	Sample size	Margin of error	Eugene Vindman (D)	Derrick Anderson (R)	Undecided
Ragnar Research Partners (R) (Note: Poll sponsored by Anderson's campaign)	October 20–22, 2024	400 (LV)	± 5.0%	44%	42%	14%
Ragnar Research Partners (R)	September 29 – October 1, 2024	400 (LV)	± 5.0%	43%	42%	15%
Ragnar Research Partners (R)	September 15–17, 2024	400 (LV)	± 5%	43%	43%	14%
Ragnar Research Partners (R)	August 4–6, 2024	400 (RV)	± 4.9%	42%	41%	17%

==== Post-primary endorsements ====
Eugene Vindman (D)

U.S. representatives

- Barbara Comstock, former U.S. representative from Virginia's 10th congressional district (2015–2019) (Republican)
- Adam Kinzinger, former U.S. representative from Illinois's 16th congressional district (2011–2023) (Republican)
- Denver Riggleman, former Republican U.S. representative from Virginia's 5th congressional district (2019–2021) (Independent)

State legislators

- Adrian Boafo, Maryland state delegate from the 23rd district (2023–present)

Organizations

- CASA in Action
- Everytown for Gun Safety
Derrick Anderson (R)

Executive branch officials

- Donald Trump, 45th president of the United States (2017–2021)

==== Predictions ====
Source	Ranking	As of
The Cook Political Report	Tossup	October 8, 2024
Inside Elections	Tilt D	October 31, 2024
Sabato's Crystal Ball	Lean D	November 13, 2023
Elections Daily	Lean D	June 8, 2023
CNalysis	Lean D	October 7, 2024
Decision Desk HQ	Likely D	October 7, 2024

==== Results ====
2024 Virginia's 7th congressional district election
Party	Candidate	Votes	%
Democratic	Eugene Vindman	203,336	51.2
Republican	Derrick Anderson	192,847	48.5
Write-in		1,116	0.3
Total votes		397,299	100.0
Democratic hold			

==== By county and independent city ====
Locality	Eugene Vindman Democratic		Derrick Anderson Republican		Write-in Various		Margin		Total votes cast
Locality	#	%	#	%	#	%	#	%	Total votes cast
Albemarle (part)	10	29.41%	24	70.59%	0	0.00%	−14	−41.18%	34
Caroline	7,688	44.50%	9,562	55.34%	28	0.16%	−1,874	−10.85%	17,278
Culpeper	10,526	37.36%	17,602	62.47%	47	0.17%	−7,076	−25.11%	28,175
Fredericksburg	8,719	65.11%	4,636	34.62%	37	0.28%	4,083	30.49%	13,392
Greene	4,509	37.80%	7,397	62.01%	23	0.19%	−2,888	−24.21%	11,929
King George	5,586	36.57%	9,662	63.26%	25	0.16%	−4,076	−26.69%	15,273
Madison	2,659	31.77%	5,703	68.14%	8	0.10%	−3,044	−36.37%	8,370
Orange	8,257	37.49%	13,700	62.21%	66	0.30%	−5,443	−24.72%	22,023
Prince William (part)	79,078	65.68%	40,767	33.86%	562	0.47%	38,311	31.82%	120,407
Spotsylvania	35,407	45.20%	42,775	54.61%	147	0.19%	−7,368	−9.41%	78,329
Stafford	40,897	49.82%	41,019	49.97%	173	0.21%	−122	−0.15%	82,089
Totals	203,336	51.18%	192,847	48.54%	1,116	0.28%	10,489	2.64%	397,299

== District 8 ==
2024 Virginia's 8th congressional district election
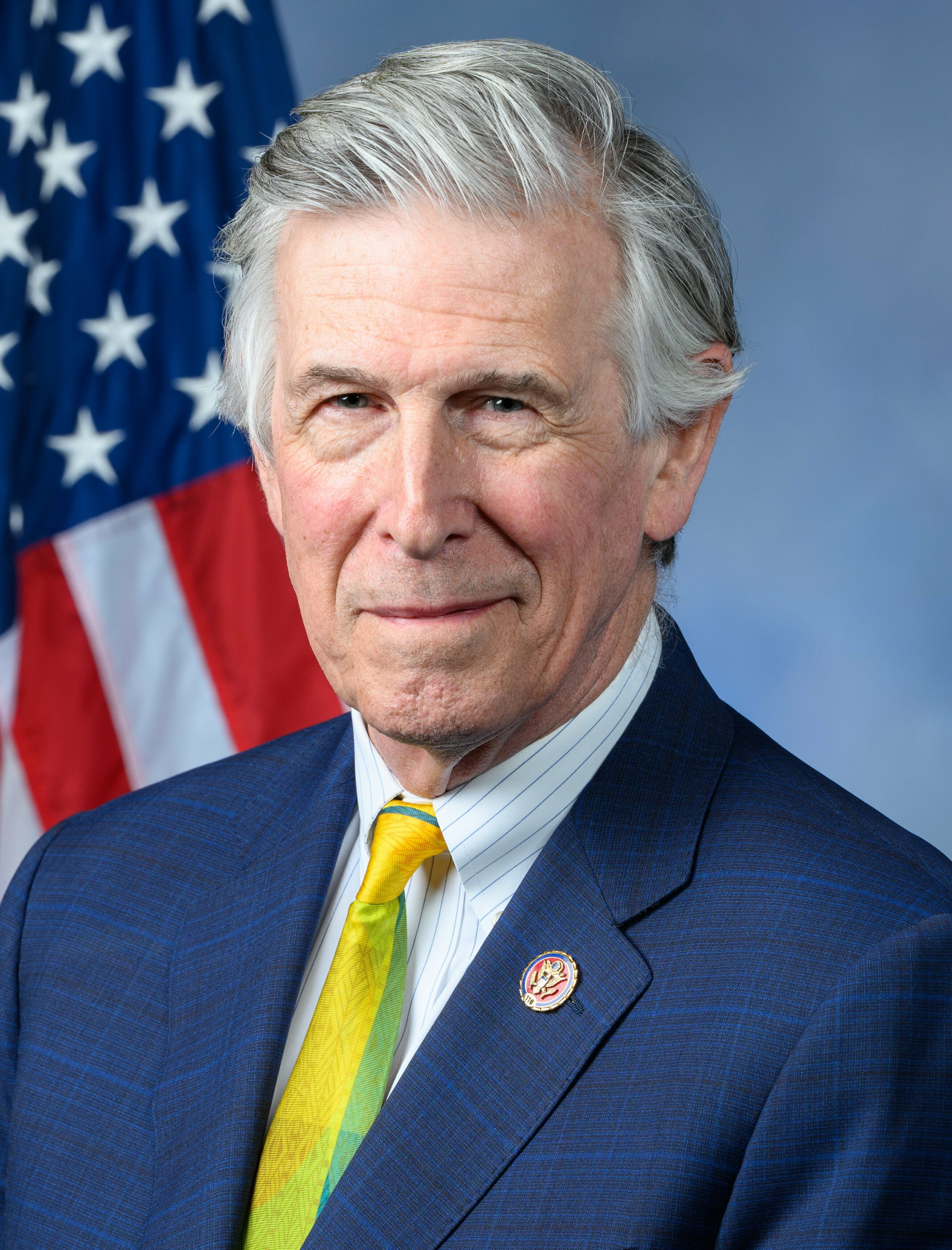

Nominee	Don Beyer	Jerry Torres
Party	Democratic	Republican
Popular vote	274,593	94,676
Percentage	71.5%	24.7%
- Beyer: 50–60% 60–70% 70–80% 80–90% Torres: 50–60% No votes
U.S. Representative before election
Don Beyer
Democratic
Elected U.S. Representative
Don Beyer
Democratic

The 8th district is based in northern Virginia and encompasses the inner Washington, D.C. suburbs, including Arlington, Alexandria, and Falls Church. The incumbent was Democrat Don Beyer, who was re-elected with 73.67% of the vote in 2022.

=== Democratic primary ===
==== Nominee ====
- Don Beyer, incumbent U.S. representative

==== Endorsements ====
Don Beyer

Organizations

- Council for a Livable World
- Emgage Action
- Feminist Majority PAC
- Humane Society Legislative Fund
- J Street PAC
- League of Conservation Voters
- Natural Resources Defense Council
- Population Connection Action Fund
- Sierra Club

Labor unions

- National Education Association

==== Fundraising ====
Campaign finance reports as of May 29, 2024
Candidate	Raised	Spent	Cash on hand
Don Beyer (D)	$1,345,319	$1,520,241	$421,840
Source: Federal Election Commission

=== Republican primary ===
==== Nominee ====
- Jerry Torres, retired defense contractor and candidate for Florida's 14th congressional district in 2022

=== Independents ===
- Bentley Foster Hensel, technical product manager
- David Kennedy, financial analyst

=== General election ===
==== Predictions ====
Source	Ranking	As of
The Cook Political Report	Solid D	March 21, 2024
Inside Elections	Solid D	July 28, 2023
Sabato's Crystal Ball	Safe D	November 13, 2023
Elections Daily	Safe D	June 8, 2023
CNalysis	Solid D	November 16, 2023
Decision Desk HQ	Safe D	October 22, 2024

==== Results ====
2024 Virginia's 8th congressional district election
Party	Candidate	Votes	%
Democratic	Don Beyer (incumbent)	274,593	71.5
Republican	Jerry Torres	94,676	24.7
Independent	David Kennedy	9,956	2.6
Independent	Bentley Foster Hensel	3,656	1.0
Write-in		1,034	0.3
Total votes		383,915	100.0
Democratic hold			

==== By county and independent city ====
Locality	Don Beyer Democratic		Jerry Torres Republican		Various candidates Other parties		Margin		Total votes cast
Locality	#	%	#	%	#	%	#	%	Total votes cast
Alexandria	59,657	75.07%	16,692	21.01%	3,117	3.92%	42,965	54.07%	79,466
Arlington	96,185	75.35%	26,659	20.89%	4,801	3.76%	69,526	54.47%	127,645
Fairfax County (part)	111,763	66.58%	49,648	29.57%	6,463	3.85%	62,115	37.00%	167,874
Falls Church	6,988	78.25%	1,677	18.78%	265	2.97%	5,311	59.47%	8,930
Totals	274,593	71.52%	94,676	24.66%	14,646	3.81%	179,917	46.86%	383,915

== District 9 ==
2024 Virginia's 9th congressional district election
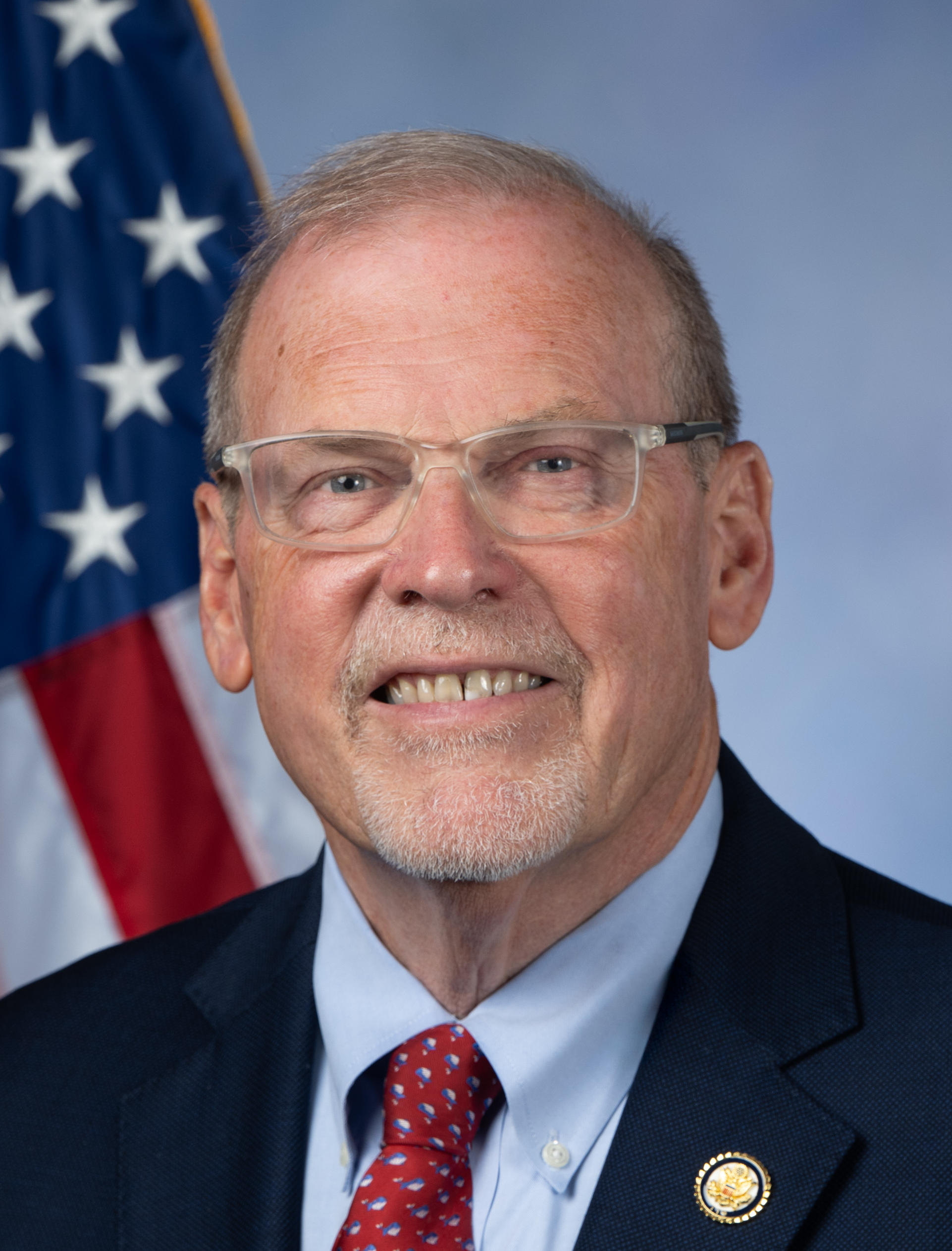

Nominee	Morgan Griffith	Karen Baker
Party	Republican	Democratic
Popular vote	290,645	109,570
Percentage	72.5%	27.3%
- County and independent city results Griffith: 50–60% 60–70% 70–80% 80–90% Baker: 50–60%
U.S. Representative before election
Morgan Griffith
Republican
Elected U.S. Representative
Morgan Griffith
Republican

The 9th district takes in rural southwest Virginia, including Abingdon, Blacksburg, Bristol and Norton. The incumbent was Republican Morgan Griffith, who was re-elected with 73.40% of the vote in 2022.

=== Republican primary ===
==== Nominee ====
- Morgan Griffith, incumbent U.S. representative

==== Endorsements ====
Morgan Griffith

Organizations

- AIPAC

==== Fundraising ====
Campaign finance reports as of May 29, 2024
Candidate	Raised	Spent	Cash on hand
Morgan Griffith (R)	$622,211	$618,281	$593,166
Source: Federal Election Commission

=== Democratic primary ===
==== Nominee ====
- Karen Baker, retired attorney

==== Endorsements ====
Karen Baker

Organizations

- National Organization for Women PAC

==== Fundraising ====
Campaign finance reports as of March 31, 2024
Candidate	Raised	Spent	Cash on hand
Karen Baker (D)	$11,379 (Note: $2,000 of this total was self-funded by Baker.)	$4,313	$7,065
Source: Federal Election Commission

=== General election ===
==== Debates ====
2024 Virginia's 9th congressional district debate
No.	Date	Host	Moderator	Link	Republican	Democratic
Key: P Participant A Absent N Not invited I Invited W Withdrawn						
Key: P Participant A Absent N Not invited I Invited W Withdrawn					Griffith	Baker
1	August 28, 2024	WUVT-FM	Felix Redmond; Mary Peyton Marble	YouTube	P	P

==== Predictions ====
Source	Ranking	As of
The Cook Political Report	Solid R	March 21, 2024
Inside Elections	Solid R	July 28, 2023
Sabato's Crystal Ball	Safe R	November 13, 2023
Elections Daily	Safe R	June 8, 2023
CNalysis	Solid R	November 16, 2023

==== Results ====
2024 Virginia's 9th congressional district election
Party	Candidate	Votes	%
Republican	Morgan Griffith (incumbent)	290,645	72.5
Democratic	Karen Baker	109,570	27.3
Write-in		748	0.2
Total votes		400,963	100.0
Republican hold			

==== By county and independent city ====
Locality	Morgan Griffith Republican		Karen Baker Democratic		Write-in Various		Margin		Total votes cast
Locality	#	%	#	%	#	%	#	%	Total votes cast
Bedford (part)	24,196	77.66%	6,927	22.23%	34	0.11%	17,269	55.43%	31,157
Bland	2,961	85.23%	511	14.71%	2	0.06%	2,450	70.52%	3,474
Bristol	5,169	70.73%	2,127	29.11%	12	0.16%	3,042	41.63%	7,308
Buchanan	7,598	83.61%	1,471	16.19%	18	0.20%	6,127	67.43%	9,087
Carroll	12,984	81.78%	2,879	18.13%	14	0.09%	10,105	63.65%	15,877
Craig	2,557	83.07%	514	16.70%	7	0.23%	2,043	66.37%	3,078
Dickenson	5,294	77.16%	1,555	22.66%	12	0.17%	3,739	54.50%	6,861
Floyd	6,618	69.03%	2,957	30.84%	12	0.13%	3,661	38.19%	9,587
Franklin County	22,506	73.91%	7,906	25.96%	40	0.13%	14,600	47.94%	30,452
Galax	1,942	72.30%	738	27.48%	6	0.22%	1,204	44.83%	2,686
Giles	7,119	78.25%	1,964	21.59%	15	0.16%	5,155	56.66%	9,098
Grayson	6,426	80.68%	1,525	19.15%	14	0.18%	4,901	61.53%	7,965
Henry	16,871	67.76%	7,975	32.03%	52	0.21%	8,896	35.73%	24,898
Lee	8,357	85.00%	1,456	14.81%	19	0.19%	6,901	70.19%	9,832
Martinsville	2,261	41.17%	3,219	58.61%	12	0.22%	-958	-17.44%	5,492
Montgomery	23,423	50.32%	22,983	49.38%	139	0.30%	440	0.95%	46,545
Norton	1,164	73.07%	428	26.87%	1	0.06%	736	46.20%	1,593
Patrick	7,595	80.51%	1,829	19.39%	10	0.11%	5,766	61.12%	9,434
Pulaski	12,877	73.71%	4,568	26.15%	24	0.14%	8,309	47.56%	17,469
Radford	3,320	51.58%	3,102	48.20%	14	0.22%	218	3.39%	6,436
Roanoke County (part)	14,440	59.78%	9,664	40.01%	52	0.22%	4,776	19.77%	24,156
Russell	10,696	80.51%	2,564	19.30%	25	0.19%	8,132	61.21%	13,285
Scott	9,089	83.73%	1,743	16.06%	23	0.21%	7,346	67.67%	10,855
Smyth	11,425	80.29%	2,776	19.51%	28	0.20%	8,649	60.78%	14,229
Tazewell	16,113	83.34%	3,191	16.50%	30	0.16%	12,922	66.84%	19,334
Washington	22,354	76.63%	6,761	23.18%	58	0.20%	15,593	53.45%	29,173
Wise	13,082	79.90%	3,247	19.83%	44	0.27%	9,835	60.07%	16,373
Wythe	12,208	80.16%	2,990	19.63%	31	0.20%	9,218	60.53%	15,229
Totals	290,645	72.49%	109,570	27.33%	748	0.19%	181,075	45.16%	400,963

== District 10 ==
2024 Virginia's 10th congressional district election
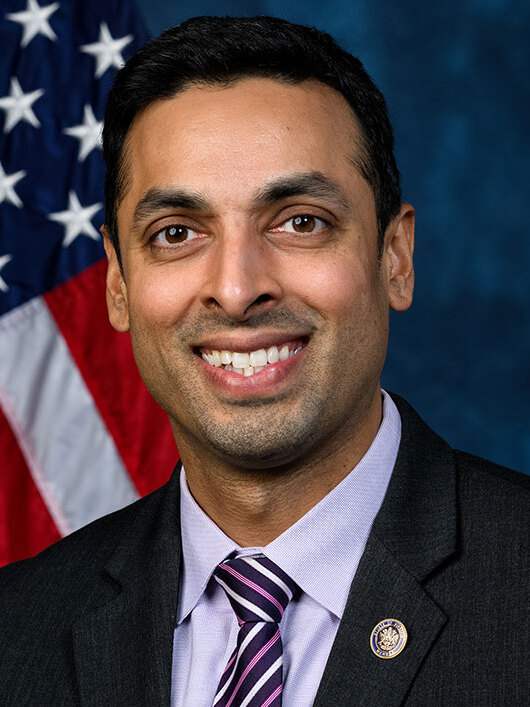

Nominee	Suhas Subramanyam	Mike Clancy
Party	Democratic	Republican
Popular vote	215,131	196,343
Percentage	52.1%	47.5%
- Subramanyam: 40–50% 50–60% 60–70% Clancy: 40–50% 50–60% 60–70% 70–80%
U.S. Representative before election
Jennifer Wexton
Democratic
Elected U.S. Representative
Suhas Subramanyam
Democratic

The 10th district is based in northern Virginia and the D.C. metro area, encompassing Fauquier, Loudoun, and Rappahannock counties, the independent cities of Manassas and Manassas Park, and portions of Fairfax and Prince William counties. The incumbent was Democrat Jennifer Wexton, who was re-elected with 53.26% of the vote in 2022. Wexton announced that she would not seek re-election in 2024, citing a diagnosis of progressive supranuclear palsy.

=== Democratic primary ===
==== Nominee ====
- Suhas Subramanyam, state senator from the 32nd district (2024–present)

==== Eliminated in primary ====
- Jennifer Boysko, state senator from the 38th district (2019–present)
- Marion Devoe, community college administrator
- Eileen Filler-Corn, former speaker of the Virginia House of Delegates (2020–2022) for the 41st district (2010–2024)
- Dan Helmer, state delegate from the 10th district (2020–present) and candidate for this seat in 2018
- Krystle Kaul, communications consultant
- Mark Leighton, attorney
- Michelle Maldonado, state delegate from the 20th district (2022–present)
- Travis Nembhard, attorney, former administrative law judge, and nominee for HD-22 in 2023
- Adrian Pokharel, former NSA and CIA officer
- Atif Qarni, former Virginia secretary of education (2018–2021)
- David Reid, state delegate from the 28th district (2018–present)

==== Withdrawn ====
- Brandon Garay, legislative affairs specialist in the office of the under secretary of defense for research and engineering (running for Leesburg town council)

==== Declined ====
- Elizabeth Guzmán, state delegate from the 31st district (2018–present), candidate for lieutenant governor in 2021, and candidate for SD-29 in 2023 (ran in the 7th district)
- Mark Herring, former Virginia attorney general (2014–2022) (endorsed Filler-Corn)
- Jessica Post, president of the Democratic Legislative Campaign Committee
- Phyllis Randall, chair at-large of the Loudoun County Board of Supervisors (2016–present)
- Danica Roem, state senator from SD-30 (2024–present) and state delegate from the 13th district (2018–2024)
- Eugene Vindman, former deputy legal advisor to the U.S. National Security Council (running in the 7th district)
- Jennifer Wexton, incumbent U.S. representative (endorsed Subramanyam)

==== Endorsements ====
Jennifer Boysko

U.S. representatives

- Jennifer McClellan, U.S. representative from Virginia's 4th congressional district (2023–present)

Statewide officials

- Howard Dean, former governor of Vermont (1991–2003) and former chair of the Democratic National Committee (2005–2009)

State legislators

- Lashrecse Aird, state senator from the 13th district (2024–present)
- Louise Lucas, president pro tempore of the Virginia Senate (2020–present) from the 18th district (1992–present) (co-endorsement with Filler-Corn, Helmer, Maldonado, Qarni, and Subramanyam)
- Atoosa Reaser, state delegate from the 27th district (2024–present)
- Irene Shin, state delegate from the 8th district (2022–present)

Local officials

- Juli Briskman, Loudoun County supervisor from the Algonkian District (2020–present)
- John Foust, former Fairfax County supervisor from the Dranesville district (2008–2024)
Eileen Filler-Corn

U.S. representatives

- Carolyn Maloney, U.S. representative from New York's 12th congressional district (1993–2023)
- Kathy Manning, U.S. representative from North Carolina's 6th congressional district (2021–present)
- Jamie Raskin, U.S. representative from Maryland's 8th congressional district (2017–present)

Statewide officials

- Mark Herring, former Virginia attorney general (2014–2022)
- Ralph Northam, former governor of Virginia (2018–2022)

State legislators

- Janet Howell, former state senator from the 32nd district (1992–2024)
- Cheryl Kagan, Maryland state senator from the 17th district (2015–present)
- Louise Lucas, president pro tempore of the Virginia Senate (2020–present) from the 18th district (1992–present) (co-endorsement with Boysko, Helmer, Maldonado, Qarni, and Subramanyam)
- David Marsden, state senator from the 35th district (2010–present)
- Emilie Miller, former state senator from the 34th district (1988–1992)
- 16 current and former state delegates

Individuals

- Fred Guttenberg, gun-control activist
- Bill Novelli, former CEO of AARP
- Joseph Sakran, surgeon

Organizations

- Democratic Majority for Israel
- Feminist Majority PAC
- National Organization for Women PAC

Labor unions

- American Federation of State, County and Municipal Employees

Newspapers

- Washington Jewish Week
Dan Helmer

U.S. representatives

- Maxwell Frost, U.S. representative from Florida's 10th congressional district (2023–present)
- Seth Moulton, U.S. representative from Massachusetts's 6th congressional district (2015–present)

State legislators

- Louise Lucas, president pro tempore of the Virginia Senate (2020–present) from the 18th district (1992–present) (co-endorsement with Boysko, Filler-Corn, Maldonado, Qarni, and Subramanyam)

Organizations

- VoteVets
- With Honor Fund

Labor unions

- Association of Flight Attendants
- Mid-Atlantic Pipe Trades Association
- UNITE HERE Local 25

Newspapers

- The Washington Post (Democratic primary only)
Michelle Maldonado

State legislators

- Louise Lucas, president pro tempore of the Virginia Senate (2020–present) from the 18th district (1992–present) (co-endorsement with Boysko, Filler-Corn, Helmer, Qarni, and Subramanyam)
Travis Nembhard

Organizations

- CASA in Action
Atif Qarni

State legislators

- Louise Lucas, president pro tempore of the Virginia Senate (2020–present) from the 18th district (1992–present) (co-endorsement with Boysko, Filler-Corn, Helmer, Maldonado, and Subramanyam)
- Jeremy McPike, state senator from the 29th district (2016–present)

Organizations

- Emgage Action
- Vote Common Good
David Reid

State legislators

- Marty Martinez, state delegate from the 29th district (2024–present)
Suhas Subramanyam

U.S. representatives

- Jennifer Wexton, U.S. representative from VA-10

State legislators

- Louise Lucas, president pro tempore of the Virginia Senate (2020–present) from the 18th district (1992–present) (co-endorsement with Boysko, Filler-Corn, Helmer, Maldonado, and Qarni)
- Russet Perry, state senator from the 31st district (2024–present)
- Scott Surovell, majority leader of the Virginia Senate (2024–present) from the 34th district (2016–present)

Organizations

- AAPI Victory Fund
- Asian American Action Fund
Jennifer Wexton (declined to run)

Organizations

- J Street PAC
- Joint Action Committee for Political Affairs
- Population Connection Action Fund

==== Polling ====
Poll source	Date(s) administered	Sample size	Margin of error	Jennifer Boysko	Eileen Filler-Corn	Dan Helmer	Atif Qarni	David Reid	Suhas Subramanyam	Other	Undecided
SurveyMonkey (Note: Poll sponsored by Qarni's campaign)	May 17–23, 2024	792 (LV)	–	7%	9%	17%	12%	5%	16%	7% (Note: Krystle Kaul and Michelle Maldonado with 3%; Travis Nembhard with 2%; Marion Devoe and Mark Leighton with 1%; Adrian Pokharel with <1%)	26%
Garin-Hart-Yang (Note: Poll sponsored by Boysko's campaign)	March 13–17, 2024	400 (LV)	± 5.0%	14%	4%	7%	1%	7%	7%	1% (Note: Krystle Kaul with 1%)	59%

==== Fundraising ====
Campaign finance reports as of May 29, 2024
Candidate	Raised	Spent	Cash on hand
Jennifer Boysko (D)	$541,588	$446,486	$95,102
Eileen Filler-Corn (D)	$971,796	$752,761	$219,035
Marion Devoe (D)	$10,395	$0	$10,395
Dan Helmer (D)	$1,543,590 (Note: $21,100 of this total was self-funded by Helmer.)	$1,007,240	$536,349
Krystle Kaul (D)	$1,027,656 (Note: $552,509 of this total was self-funded by Kaul.)	$984,789	$42,866
Mark Leighton (D)	$8,359	$6,340	$2,018
Michelle Maldonado (D)	$99,752 (Note: $9,020 of this total was self-funded by Maldonado.)	$98,916	$835
Travis Nembhard (D)	$116,899 (Note: $7,000 of this total was self-funded by Nembhard.)	$94,146	$22,752
Adrian Pokharel (D)	$271,430 (Note: $100,000 of this total was self-funded by Pokharel.)	$186,152	$33,769
Atif Qarni (D)	$363,301	$282,871	$80,429
David Reid (D)	$279,490	$263,271	$16,218
Suhas Subramanyam (D)	$1,048,505	$762,698	$285,806
Source: Federal Election Commission

==== Results ====
Primary results by county and independent city: Subramanyam: 30–40%; Helmer: 20–30%; 30–40%; 60–70%; Maldonado: 20–30%

Democratic primary results
Party	Candidate	Votes	%
Democratic	Suhas Subramanyam	13,504	30.4
Democratic	Dan Helmer	11,784	26.6
Democratic	Atif Qarni	4,768	10.7
Democratic	Eileen Filler-Corn	4,131	9.3
Democratic	Jennifer Boysko	4,016	9.0
Democratic	David Reid	1,419	3.2
Democratic	Michelle Maldonado	1,412	3.2
Democratic	Adrian Pokharel	1,028	2.3
Democratic	Krystle Kaul	982	2.2
Democratic	Travis Nembhard	722	1.6
Democratic	Marion Devoe	386	0.9
Democratic	Mark Leighton	224	0.5
Total votes		44,376	100.0

=== Republican primary ===
==== Nominee ====
- Mike Clancy, lawyer and candidate for this district in 2022

==== Eliminated in primary ====
- Manga Anantatmula, businesswoman, nominee for the 11th district in 2020 and candidate in 2022
- Aliscia Andrews, Virginia deputy secretary of Homeland Security and nominee for this district in 2020
- Alexander Isaac Jr., retired U.S. Army lieutenant colonel

==== Declined ====
- Hung Cao, nonprofit founder and nominee for this district in 2022 (running for U.S. Senate)
- Juan Pablo Segura, entrepreneur and nominee for SD-31 in 2023

==== Endorsements ====
Alexander Isaac Jr.

Newspapers

- The Washington Post (Republican primary only)

===== Fundraising =====
Campaign finance reports as of May 29, 2024
Candidate	Raised	Spent	Cash on Hand
Manga Anantatmula (R)	$12,005	$9,186	$2,819
Aliscia Andrews (R)	$204,331	$282,887	$26,970
Mike Clancy (R)	$379,472 (Note: $250,000 of this total was self-funded by Clancy.)	$268,745	$110,727
Alexander Issac Jr. (R)	$163,051 (Note: $115,000 of this total was self-funded by Issac.)	$140,054	$22,997
Source: Federal Election Commission

==== Results ====
Primary results by county and independent city : Clancy: 50–60%; 60–70%; 70–80%

Republican primary results
Party	Candidate	Votes	%
Republican	Mike Clancy	17,434	64.2
Republican	Aliscia Andrews	5,832	21.5
Republican	Alexander Isaac Jr.	2,544	9.4
Republican	Manga Anantatmula	1,327	4.9
Total votes		27,137	100.0

=== General election ===
==== Debate ====
2024 Virginia's 10th congressional district debate
No.	Date	Host	Moderator	Link	Democratic	Republican
Key: P Participant A Absent N Not invited I Invited W Withdrawn						
Key: P Participant A Absent N Not invited I Invited W Withdrawn					Subramanyam	Clancy
1	September 26, 2024	ABC 7	Scott Thuman; Nick Minock	YouTube	P	P

==== Post-primary endorsements ====
Suhas Subramanyam (D)

Federal officials

- Barbara Comstock, former U.S. representative from this district (2015–2019) (Republican)

Organizations

- CASA in Action
- Everytown for Gun Safety
- Reproductive Freedom for All
Mike Clancy (R)

Federal officials

- Vivek Ramaswamy, businessman and former 2024 Republican presidential candidate

==== Predictions ====
Source	Ranking	As of
The Cook Political Report	Solid D	March 21, 2024
Inside Elections	Solid D	June 20, 2024
Sabato's Crystal Ball	Safe D	November 13, 2023
Elections Daily	Safe D	June 8, 2023
CNalysis	Solid D	November 16, 2023
Decision Desk HQ	Safe D	October 22, 2024

==== Results ====
2024 Virginia's 10th congressional district election
Party	Candidate	Votes	%
Democratic	Suhas Subramanyam	215,131	52.1
Republican	Mike Clancy	196,343	47.5
Write-in		1,538	0.4
Total votes		413,012	100.0
Democratic hold			

==== By county and independent city ====
Locality	Suhas Subramanyam Democratic		Mike Clancy Republican		Write-in Various		Margin		Total votes cast
Locality	#	%	#	%	#	%	#	%	Total votes cast
Fairfax County (part)	6,238	50.08%	6,182	49.63%	37	0.30%	56	0.45%	12,457
Fauquier	16,073	36.69%	27,662	63.15%	70	0.16%	-11,589	-26.46%	43,805
Loudoun	127,234	56.02%	98,857	43.53%	1,027	0.45%	28,377	12.49%	227,118
Manassas	8,741	55.51%	6,961	44.21%	44	0.28%	1,780	11.30%	15,746
Manassas Park	3,432	59.37%	2,311	39.98%	38	0.66%	1,121	19.39%	5,781
Prince William (part)	51,455	49.87%	51,406	49.83%	307	0.30%	49	0.05%	103,168
Rappahannock	1,958	39.66%	2,964	60.04%	15	0.30%	-1,006	-20.38%	4,937
Totals	215,131	52.09%	196,343	47.54%	1,538	0.37%	18,788	4.55%	413,012

== District 11 ==
2024 Virginia's 11th congressional district election
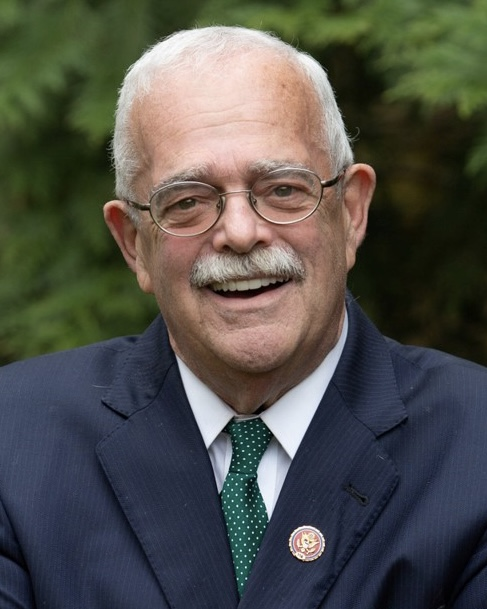

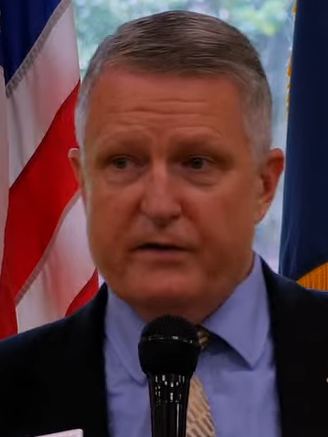
Nominee	Gerry Connolly	Michael Van Meter
Party	Democratic	Republican
Popular vote	273,529	134,802
Percentage	66.7%	32.9%
- County and independent city results Connolly: 60–70%
U.S. Representative before election
Gerry Connolly
Democratic
Elected U.S. Representative
Gerry Connolly
Democratic

The 11th district encompasses portions of suburban Washington, D.C., including the city of Fairfax and portions of Fairfax County. The incumbent was Democrat Gerry Connolly, who was re-elected with 66.89% of the vote in 2022.

=== Democratic primary ===
==== Nominee ====
- Gerry Connolly, incumbent U.S. representative

==== Eliminated in primary ====
- Ahsan Nasar, cybersecurity attorney

==== Endorsements ====
Gerry Connolly

Organizations

- Emgage Action
- Feminist Majority PAC
- Humane Society Legislative Fund
- Population Connection Action Fund
- Sierra Club

=== Fundraising ===
Campaign finance reports as of May 29, 2024
Candidate	Raised	Spent	Cash on hand
Gerry Connolly (D)	$1,828,203	$1,116,153	$3,864,549
Ahsan Nasar (D)	$96,950	$73,097	$23,853
Source: Federal Election Commission

==== Results ====
Democratic primary results
Party	Candidate	Votes	%
Democratic	Gerry Connolly (incumbent)	37,378	85.6
Democratic	Ahsan Nasar	6,270	14.4
Total votes		43,648	100.0

=== Republican primary ===
==== Nominee ====
- Michael Van Meter, behavioral therapist and nominee for SD-33 in 2023

=== Fundraising ===
Campaign finance reports as of May 29, 2024
Candidate	Raised	Spent	Cash on hand
Michael Van Meter (R)	$14,906	$9,022	$5,883
Source: Federal Election Commission

=== General election ===
==== Predictions ====
Source	Ranking	As of
The Cook Political Report	Solid D	March 21, 2024
Inside Elections	Solid D	July 28, 2023
Sabato's Crystal Ball	Safe D	November 13, 2023
Elections Daily	Safe D	June 8, 2023
CNalysis	Solid D	November 16, 2023
Decision Desk HQ	Safe D	October 22, 2024

==== Results ====
2024 Virginia's 11th congressional district election
Party	Candidate	Votes	%
Democratic	Gerry Connolly (incumbent)	273,529	66.7
Republican	Michael Van Meter	134,802	32.9
Write-in		1,855	0.5
Total votes		410,186	100.0
Democratic hold			

==== By county and independent city ====
Locality	Gerry Connolly Democratic		Michael Van Meter Republican		Write-in Various		Margin		Total votes cast
Locality	#	%	#	%	#	%	#	%	Total votes cast
Fairfax City	8,804	66.18%	4,434	33.33%	66	0.50%	4,370	32.85%	13,304
Fairfax County (part)	264,725	66.70%	130,368	32.85%	1,789	0.45%	134,357	33.85%	396,882
Totals	273,529	66.68%	134,802	32.86%	1,855	0.45%	138,727	33.82%	410,186

== See also ==
- 2024 Virginia elections

== Notes ==
Partisan clients
