= Marty Martinez =

Marty Martinez may refer to:

- Marty Martínez, former MLB player, manager and coach
- Marty Martinez (soccer), manager for the West Virginia Chaos soccer team
- Matthew G. Martínez, former US congressional representative
- Marty Martinez (Virginia politician), state legislator
- Martin Casaus, American professional wrestler under the ring name of Marty "The Moth" Martinez
