= Leslie Mehta =

American politician

Member of the Virginia House of Delegates from the 73rd district
- Incumbent
- Assumed office January 14, 2026
- Preceded by: Mark Earley Jr.

Personal details
- Born: North Carolina
- Party: Democratic
- Website: https://lesliemehta.com/

Leslie Chambers Mehta is an American politician who is the elected member of the Virginia House of Delegates for the 73rd District. She took office as a member of the 164th Virginia General Assembly on January 14, 2026. She won election on November 4, 2025, defeating Republican incumbent Mark Earley Jr. by a margin of 3.66%.

Mehta grew up in a small town in rural North Carolina, where her mother was a social worker and her father was a corrections officer. She is a lawyer, and was the former legal director for the Virginia American Civil Liberties Union. She was appointed to the Commission on Racial Inequity in the Law by Virginia governor Ralph Northam, and to the Rare Disease Council by governor Glenn Youngkin. She was also the interim CEO of the International Rett Syndrome Foundation. Her eldest daughter died from Rett syndrome in 2021.

Mehta ran as the Democratic nominee against Republican incumbent Rob Wittman in the election for Virginia's 1st congressional district in 2024 and was unsuccessful.

In her 2025 election, she was endorsed by Planned Parenthood of Virginia, Clean Virginia, the Sierra Club, EMILYs List, the Virginia League of Conservation Voters, Virginians for Change, Giffords PAC, Virginia Service Employees International Union, the Virginia AFL-CIO, the United Brotherhood of Carpenters and Joiners of America, and the Mid-Atlantic Pipe Trades Association.

== Virginia House of Delegates ==
Mehta was first elected to the House of Delegates in 2025. She currently sits on the Courts of Justice and Transportation Committees.

== Electoral History ==
=== 2025 ===
2025 Virginia House of Delegates District 73 Election
Primary election
Party	Candidate	Votes	%
Democratic	Leslie Mehta	5,341	76.37
Democratic	Justin Woodford	1,653	23.63
Total votes		6,994	100.00
General election
Democratic	Leslie Mehta	26,122	51.78
Republican	Mark Earley Jr.	24,275	48.12
Total votes		50,397	99.90
Democratic gain from Republican			
