= Mark Earley Jr. =

Virginia House of Delegates member

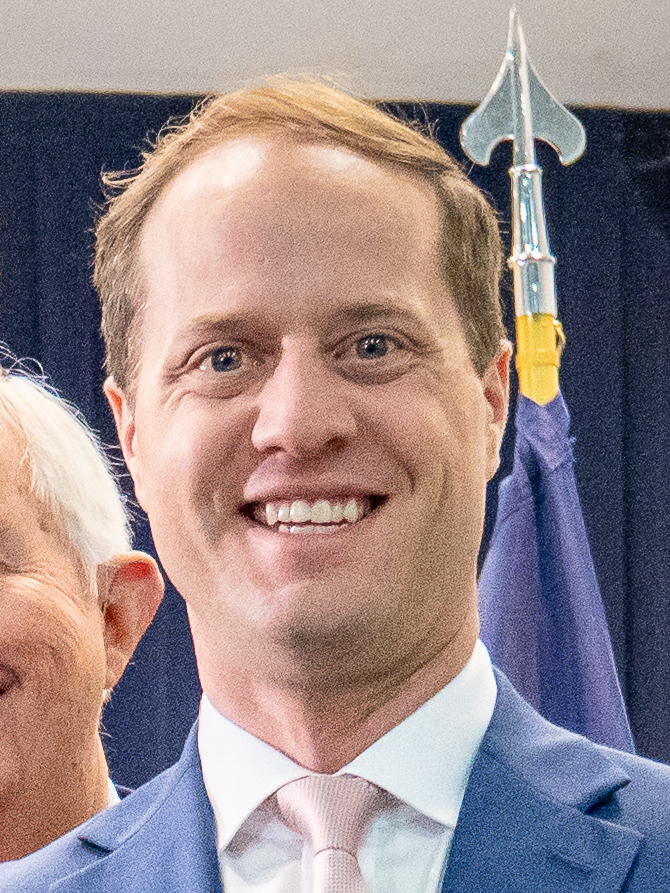
- Earley in 2025

Member of the Virginia House of Delegates from the 73rd district
- In office January 10, 2024 – January 14, 2026
- Preceded by: Rodney Willett (redistricting)
- Succeeded by: Leslie Mehta

Personal details
- Born: Mark Lawrence Earley Jr. 1987 (age 38–39) Chesapeake, Virginia, U.S.
- Party: Republican
- Spouse: Mary Alice
- Children: 2
- Parents: Mark Earley; Cynthia Breithaupt
- Education: Virginia Tech (BA); University of Virginia (JD)
- Occupation: Lawyer; politician
- Website: www.markearleyforva.com

Mark Lawrence Earley Jr. (born 1987) is an American lawyer and Republican Party politician from Virginia. A son of former state senator and attorney general Mark Earley, he ran in 2021 for the 68th district seat in the Virginia House of Delegates, losing to the Democratic incumbent, Dawn Adams. In 2023, he ran in the newly redrawn 73rd district against businessman Herb Walke.

In 2025, he narrowly lost his seat to Leslie Mehta, a civil rights attorney.

Virginia House of Delegates
Preceded by Rodney Willett	Member of the Virginia House of Delegates from the 73rd district 2024–present	Succeeded by Incumbent
