= Joseph Sakran =

American trauma surgeon

Joseph V. Sakran
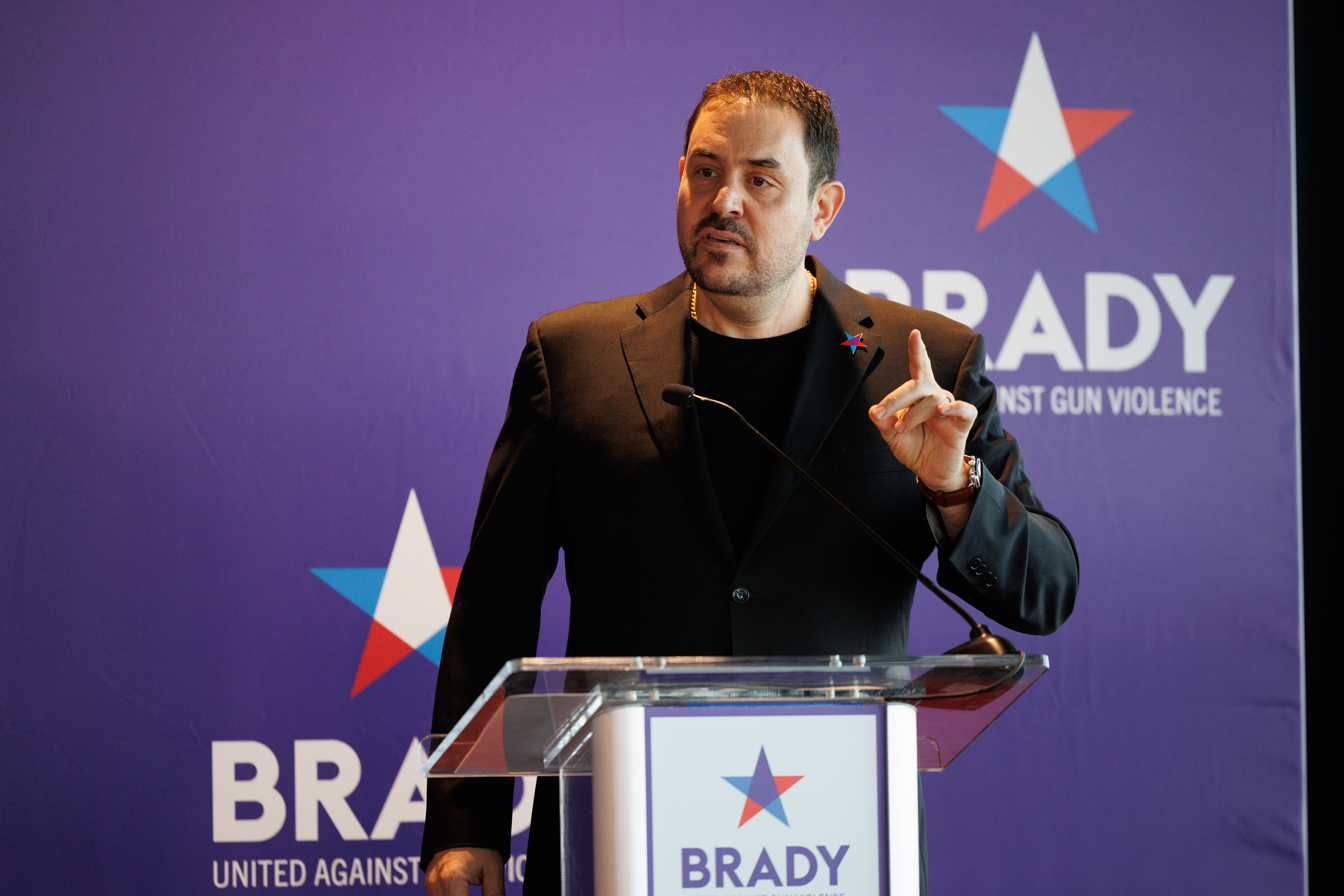
- Joseph V. Sakran in 2024
- Born: August 3, 1977 (age 49); Falls Church, Virginia
- Citizenship: American
- Education: George Mason University (BS); Johns Hopkins Bloomberg School of Public Health (MPH); Harvard University (MPA); Ben-Gurion University (MD)
- Occupations: Trauma surgeon, gun violence prevention advocate
- Medical career
- Field: Surgery, public health, gun violence prevention, healthcare policy
- Website: Official profile

Joseph V. Sakran (born August 3, 1977, Falls Church, Virginia) is an American trauma surgeon, public health researcher, health policy advocate, and activist. He is currently an associate professor of surgery at the Johns Hopkins University, Executive Vice Chair of Surgery, and Director of Clinical Operations for Surgery at Johns Hopkins Medicine.

Sakran was shot in the throat by a stray bullet at the age of 17, which led him to advocate for gun violence prevention.

== Early life and education ==
Sakran was born in Falls Church, Virginia to immigrant parents. He attended high school in Burke, Virginia. As a high school senior, at a local playground after attending a football game at Lake Braddock Secondary School, he was struck in the neck from a stray bullet fired into a crowd. With his windpipe ruptured and carotid artery severed, he was saved by Dr. Robert Ahmed, a trauma surgeon, and Dr. Dipankar Mukherjee, a vascular surgeon, at Inova Fairfax Hospital. He gained experience as a medic and firefighter at the City of Fairfax Fire & Rescue Department.

Sakran earned an undergraduate degree in biology and minor in chemistry from George Mason University in 1999. He graduated with a Doctor of Medicine from Ben-Gurion University of the Negev Medical School for International Health in 2005 and earned a Master of Public health from the Johns Hopkins Bloomberg School of Public Health in 2003. He also holds a Master of Public Administration from the Harvard Kennedy School of Government. He completed his general surgery residency training at Inova Fairfax Hospital and then fellowship at the University of Pennsylvania in Traumatology, Surgical Critical Care, and Emergency General Surgery.

== Career ==
Starting from 2023, Sakran has partnered with colleagues to lead efforts in scaling the implementation of opportunistic salpingectomy (OS), which involves the removal of fallopian tubes during planned abdominal surgeries to prevent ovarian cancer..

Sakran was inducted to the National Academy of Medicine in 2023.

In 2024, he received the 2024 President Frontier Award from Johns Hopkins University.

Sakran also serves as Board Chair for Brady and is its Chief Medical Officer. In addition, he is the Chair of This Is Our Lane Advisory Council.

== Gun violence prevention advocacy ==
In 2016, Sakran's activism first achieved national recognition when he founded Doctors for Hillary, supporting the candidacy of Hillary Clinton, who had made gun violence prevention a central tenet of her campaign. He was recognized by Secretary Clinton for his work.

His research in public health and specifically firearm injury prevention has been recognized by the Agency for Healthcare Research and Quality (AHRQ) and Academy Health. A recent study published in Health Affairs, Emergency Department Visits for Firearm-Related Injuries in the United States, 2006-14 was given an honorable mention as one of the 2017 Outstanding Article of the Year Award by Health Cost and Utilization Project (HCUP).

Sakran has also written numerous opinion pieces for The Atlantic and CNN. In February 2019, Congressman Mike Thompson (D-CA), invited Sakran as his guest to the State of the Union, recognizing his support for gun control as a trauma surgeon. On February 6, 2019, Congressman Jerrold Nadler (D-NY) and Chairman of the House Judiciary Committee invited Sakran to testify at a hearing.

In 2019, Sakran was recognized as Distinguished Alumnus of the Year by George Mason University. In the same year, he was also selected for the Presidential Leadership Scholars program, where his project focused on storage of firearms. In the same year, Sakran was selected as one of the Robert Wood Johnson Foundation Health Policy Fellows by the National Academy of Medicine. He has been working on legislative and regulatory issues since the 2010s.

== Media ==
- 2015: Featured by Harvard Kennedy School, "Surgeon Joseph Sakran MC/MPA 2015 advocates for gun reform"
- 2018: Featured in CNN, "Victim of gun violence returns to the E.R., this time as the surgeon"
- 2018: Featured in MSNBC, "Dr. Joseph Sakran On Gun Violence: We Are Facing A Public Health Crisis"
- 2018: Featured in CNN Town Hall with Chris Cuomo, "Armas de fuego: ¿Enfrenta Estados Unidos una crisis de salud pública?"
- 2018: NPR interview, "A Trauma Surgeon Who Survived Gun Violence Is Taking On The NRA"
- 2018: CNN interview, "Dr. Joseph Sakran: Gun violence victim responses to NRA"
- 2019: House Judiciary Testimony
- 2019: Story in the Public Square
- 2019: Featured in The Atlantic, "Why Doctors Are Taking on the NRA"
- 2024: Featured in The Guardian: "He was shot in the throat. Now he saves gun victims as a trauma surgeon in Baltimore"

== Selected publications ==
- Sakran JV, Ezzeddine H, Schwab CW, Bonne S, Brasel KJ, Burd RS, Cuschieri J, Ficke J, Gaines BA, Giacino JT, Gibran NS, Haider A, Hall EC, Herrera-Escobar JP, Joseph B, Kao L, Kurowski BG, Livingston D, Mandell SP, Nehra D, Sarani B, Seamon M, Yonclas P, Zarzaur B, Stewart R, Bulger E, Nathens AB (May 2020). "Proceedings from the Consensus Conference on Trauma Patient-Reported Outcome Measures". Journal of the American College of Surgeons. 230 (5): 819–835. doi:10.1016/j.jamcollsurg.2020.01.032. PMID 32201197. S2CID 214617266.
- Campbell BT, Thaker S, Fallat ME, Foley DS, McClure E, Sakran JV, Nasr IW, Ziegfeld S, Ehrlich PF, Snodgrass M, Levy M, Naik-Mathuria BJ, Johnson B, Demello AS, Jones S, Watters JM, Burke P, Allee L, Kozyckyj T, Letton RW, Kuhls DA, Bulger EM, Stewart RM (January 2020). "A Multicenter Evaluation of a Firearm Safety Intervention in the Pediatric Outpatient Setting". Journal of Pediatric Surgery. 55 (1): 140–145. doi:10.1016/j.jpedsurg.2019.09.044. PMID 31753607.
- Choron RL, Spitzer S, Sakran JV (September 2019). "Firearm Violence in America: Is There a Solution?". Advances in Surgery. 53: 195–208. doi:10.1016/j.yasu.2019.04.019. PMID 31327446. S2CID 181758756.
- Bulger EM, Kuhls DA, Campbell BT, Bonne S, Cunningham RM, Betz M, Dicker R, Ranney ML, Barsotti C, Hargarten S, Sakran JV, Rivara FP, James T, Lamis D, Timmerman G, Rogers SO, Choucair B, Stewart RM (October 2019). "Proceedings from the Medical Summit on Firearm Injury Prevention: A Public Health Approach to Reduce Death and Disability in the US". Journal of the American College of Surgeons. 229 (4): 415–430.e12. doi:10.1016/j.jamcollsurg.2019.05.018. PMID 31108194.
- Hink AB, Bonne S, Levy M, Kuhls DA, Allee L, Burke PA, Sakran JV, Bulger EM, Stewart RM (September 2019). "Firearm injury research and epidemiology: A review of the data, their limitations, and how trauma centers can improve firearm injury research". The Journal of Trauma and Acute Care Surgery. 87 (3): 678–689. doi:10.1097/TA.0000000000002330. PMID 31033891. S2CID 139104723.
- Joseph B, Zeeshan M, Sakran JV, Hamidi M, Kulvatunyou N, Khan M, O'Keeffe T, Rhee P (June 2019). "Nationwide Analysis of Resuscitative Endovascular Balloon Occlusion of the Aorta in Civilian Trauma". JAMA Surgery. 154 (6): 500–508. doi:10.1001/jamasurg.2019.0096. PMC 6584250. PMID 30892574.
- Lunardi N, Mehta A, Ezzeddine H, Canner JK, Hamidi M, Jehan F, Joseph BA, Nathens AB, Efron DT, Diaz J, Sakran JV (March 2019). "Recurring emergency general surgery: Characterizing a vulnerable population". The Journal of Trauma and Acute Care Surgery. 86 (3): 464–470. doi:10.1097/TA.0000000000002151. PMID 30605140. S2CID 58607216.
- He K, Sakran JV (March 2019). "Elimination of the Moratorium on Gun Research Is Not Enough: The Need for the CDC to Set a Budgetary Agenda". JAMA Surgery. 154 (3): 195–196. doi:10.1001/jamasurg.2018.4211. PMID 30484819. S2CID 53780883.
- Mehta A, Varma S, Efron DT, Joseph BA, Lunardi N, Haut ER, Cooper Z, Sakran JV (February 2019). "Emergency general surgery in geriatric patients: How should we evaluate hospital experience?". The Journal of Trauma and Acute Care Surgery. 86 (2): 189–195. doi:10.1097/TA.0000000000002142. PMID 30444855. S2CID 53569243.
- Sakran JV, Mehta A, Fransman R, Nathens AB, Joseph B, Kent A, Haut ER, Efron DT (July 2018). "Nationwide trends in mortality following penetrating trauma: Are we up for the challenge?". The Journal of Trauma and Acute Care Surgery. 85 (1): 160–166. doi:10.1097/TA.0000000000001907. PMID 29613947. S2CID 4590686.
- Mehta A, Efron DT, Stevens K, Manukyan MC, Joseph B, Sakran JV (May 2018). "Hospital variation in mortality after emergent bowel resections: The role of failure-to-rescue". The Journal of Trauma and Acute Care Surgery. 84 (5): 702–710. doi:10.1097/TA.0000000000001827. PMID 29401188. S2CID 24331895.
- Mehta A, Dultz LA, Joseph B, Canner JK, Stevens K, Jones C, Haut ER, Efron DT, Sakran JV (June 2018). "Emergency general surgery in geriatric patients: A statewide analysis of surgeon and hospital volume with outcomes". The Journal of Trauma and Acute Care Surgery. 84 (6): 864–875. doi:10.1097/TA.0000000000001829. PMID 29389841. S2CID 24542358.
- Gani F, Sakran JV, Canner JK (October 2017). "Emergency Department Visits For Firearm-Related Injuries In The United States, 2006-14". Health Affairs. 36 (10): 1729–1738. doi:10.1377/hlthaff.2017.0625. PMID 28971917.
- Mehta A, Efron DT, Canner JK, Dultz L, Xu T, Jones C, Haut ER, Higgins RS, Sakran JV (November 2017). "Effect of Surgeon and Hospital Volume on Emergency General Surgery Outcomes". Journal of the American College of Surgeons. 225 (5): 666–675.e2. doi:10.1016/j.jamcollsurg.2017.08.009. PMID 28838870.
- Stone R, Sakran JV, Long Roche K (June 2023). "Salpingectomy in Ovarian Cancer Prevention". JAMA. 329 (23): 2015–2016. doi:10.1001/jama.2023.6979. PMID 37261821.
- Sakran, Joseph V.; Roche, Kara Long; Stone, Rebecca (May 21, 2023). "Having Their Fallopian Tubes Removed Will Spare a Large Number of Women from Ovarian Cancer". Scientific American.
- Chidambaram, Swathikan; Stone, Rebecca; Roche, Kara Long; Sakran, Joseph V (April 11, 2025). "A Role for General Surgery in Saving Lives from Ovarian Cancer". Journal of the American College of Surgeons. doi:10.1097/XCS.0000000000001409. ISSN 1072-7515.
- MacArthur, Emily; Long Roche, Kara; Sakran, Joseph; Patel, Sunil H.; Najjar, Peter; Lu, Karen H.; Gornet, Megan; Frost, Anja S.; Walrath, Meghan; Bauer, Tom; Oh, Gyyoung; Stone, Rebecca (2024). "Salpingectomy for ovarian cancer prevention: Video education for the surgeon". Gynecologic Oncology Reports. 53 101368. doi:10.1016/j.gore.2024.101368. PMC 10997886. PMID 38584804.
- Torres CM, Kenzik KM, Saillant NN, Scantling DR, Sanchez SE, Brahmbhatt TS, Dechert TA, Sakran JV (April 2024). "Timing to First Whole Blood Transfusion and Survival Following Severe Hemorrhage in Trauma Patients". JAMA Surg. 159 (4): 374–381. doi:10.1001/jamasurg.2023.7178. PMC 10831629. PMID 38294820.
- Lunardi N, Abou-Zamzam A, Florecki KL, Chidambaram S, Shih IF, Kent AJ, Joseph B, Byrne JP, Sakran JV (May 2024). "Robotic Technology in Emergency General Surgery Cases in the Era of Minimally Invasive Surgery". JAMA Surg. 159 (5): 493–499. doi:10.1001/jamasurg.2024.0016. PMC 10918578. PMID 38446451.
- Sakran JV, Lunardi N, Mehta A, Ezzeddine HM, Chammas M, Fransman R, Byrne JP, Stevens K, Efron D (April 2024). "Increasing Injury Intensity among 6,500 Violent Deaths in the State of Maryland". J Am Coll Surg. 238 (4): 710–717. doi:10.1097/XCS.0000000000000980. PMID 38230851.
- Torres CM, Kent A, Scantling D, Joseph B, Haut ER, Sakran JV (May 2023). "Association of Whole Blood With Survival Among Patients Presenting With Severe Hemorrhage in US and Canadian Adult Civilian Trauma Centers". JAMA Surg. 158 (5): 532–540. doi:10.1001/jamasurg.2022.6978. PMC 9857728. PMID 36652255.
