= Virginia's 29th House of Delegates district =

Virginia state legislature district

Virginia's 29th State House of Delegates district
- District map from the 2023 election
Delegate
Marty Martinez; D–Leesburg
since January 10, 2024
- Demographics: 57% White; 9% Black; 14% Hispanic; 15% Asian; 4% Multiracial
- Population (2023) • Voting age: 88,183; 18
- Registered voters (2024): 61,866

Virginia's 29th House of Delegates district elects one of 100 seats in the Virginia House of Delegates, the lower house of the state's bicameral legislature. District 29 represents parts of Loudoun County. The seat is currently held by Marty Martinez, who was elected November 7, 2023.

== District officeholders ==
Years	Delegate	Party	Electoral history
January 10, 2024 – Present	Marty Martinez	Democratic	Redistricted

== Electoral history ==
Date	Election	Candidate	Party	Votes	%
Virginia House of Delegates, 29th district
Nov 2, 1993	General	Beverly Jean Sherwood	Republican	10,259	61.79
Nov 2, 1993	General	Raymond C. Sandy	Democratic	6,340	38.19
Nov 2, 1993	General	Write Ins		3	0.02
Nov 2, 1993	General	Alson H. Smith retired; seat switched from Democratic to Republican			
Nov 7, 1995	General	B J Sherwood	Republican	11,379	67.76
Nov 7, 1995	General	R G Dick	Democratic	5,414	32.24
Nov 7, 1995	General	Write Ins		1	0.01
Nov 4, 1997	General	Beverly J. Sherwood	Republican	14,826	99.95
Nov 4, 1997	General	Write Ins		11	0.05
Nov 2, 1999	General	B J Sherwood	Republican	8,660	99.83
Nov 2, 1999	General	Write Ins		15	0.17
Nov 6, 2001	General	B J Sherwood	Republican	13,897	77.55
Nov 6, 2001	General	P D Blaker		4,018	22.42
Nov 6, 2001	General	Write Ins		5	0.03
Nov 4, 2003	General	B J Sherwood	Republican	12,471	99.25
Nov 4, 2003	General	Write Ins		94	0.75
Nov 8, 2005	General	Beverly J. Sherwood	Republican	16,089	98.49
Nov 8, 2005	General	Write Ins		246	1.51
Nov 6, 2007	General	Beverly J. Sherwood	Republican	13,664	98.12
Nov 6, 2007	General	Write Ins		261	1.87
Nov 3, 2009	General	Beverly J. Sherwood	Republican	14,908	80.02
Nov 3, 2009	General	Aaron N. Tweedie		3,677	19.73
Nov 3, 2009	General	Write Ins		44	0.23
Nov 8, 2011	General	Beverly J. Sherwood	Republican	9,662	98.04
Nov 8, 2011	General	Write Ins		193	1.95
Jun 11, 2013	Republican primary	Mark J. Berg		1,573	51.32
Jun 11, 2013	Republican primary	Beverly J. Sherwood		1,492	48.68
Jun 11, 2013	Republican primary	Incumbent lost primary			
