= Marty Martinez (Virginia politician) =

American politician from Virginia

Member of the Virginia House of Delegates from the 29th district
- Incumbent
- Assumed office January 10, 2024
- Preceded by: Bill Wiley (redistricting)

Personal details
- Born: Fernando J. Martinez; 1952 (age 73–74) Victorville, California, U.S.
- Party: Democratic
- Spouse: Doris
- Children: 5
- Education: Mt. Hood Community College (AS); Portland State University (BS)
- Website: Campaign website

Fernando J. "Marty" Martinez (born 1952) is an American politician serving as a member of the Virginia House of Delegates from the 29th district since 2024. He previously served on the Leesburg City Council.

== Career ==
Martinez served in the U.S. Air Force for more than seven years during the Vietnam War era. He is a retired government contractor.

In 2002, he was elected to the Leesburg City Council and served as vice-mayor from 2019 to 2023. He supported the Washington Metro's Silver Line extension project into Loudoun County.

=== Virginia House of Delegates ===
Martinez ran for the Virginia House of Delegates in the 29th district, a new seat following redistricting, in 2023.

==== Tenure ====
Martinez sponsored a bill which would redirect some funds from plastic bag taxes from counties to cities, it passed both chambers but was vetoed by Glenn Youngkin in 2024. Youngkin signed Martinez's bill to ban declawing cats the same year.

== Personal life ==
Martinez moved to Leesburg, Virginia, in 1993 with his wife, Doris, and their children.
