= 2023 Virginia Senate election =

- November 7, 2023

All 40 seats in the Senate of Virginia 21 (Note: A majority of 20 was also possible for Republicans as the Lieutenant Governor of Virginia, a Republican at the time, held the tie-breaker vote.) seats needed for a majority
- Turnout: 41% ▼1.4
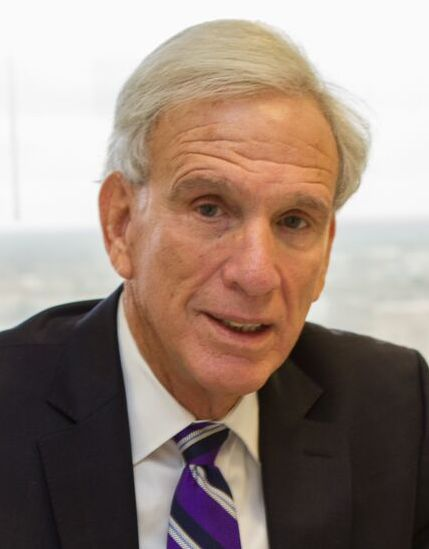

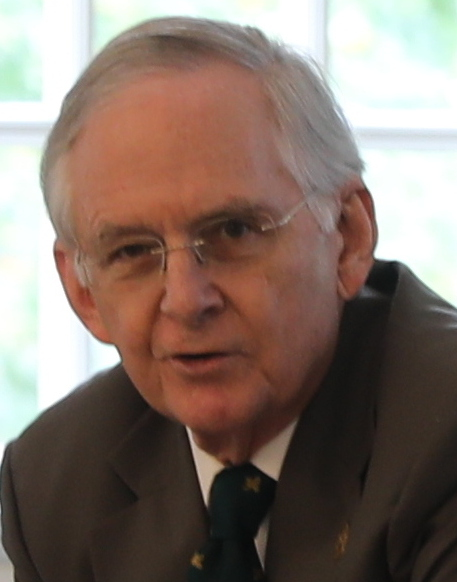
	Majority party	Minority party
Leader	Dick Saslaw (retired)	Tommy Norment (retired)
Party	Democratic	Republican
Leader since	January 10, 1996	January 9, 2008
Leader's seat	35th–Springfield	26th (Note: Redistricted from the 3rd district.)–Williamsburg
Last election	21	19
Seats before	22	17
Seats won	21	19
Seat change	▼1	▲2
Popular vote	1,229,331	1,193,583
Percentage	49.8%	48.4%
Swing	▼3.4%	▲8.6%
	Third party
Party	Non-Caucusing Republican
Last election	0
Seats before	1
Seats won	0
Seat change	▼1
- Democratic hold Democratic gain Republican hold Republican gain 40–50% 50–60% 60–70% 70–80% >90% 50–60% 60–70% 70–80% 80–90% >90%
Majority Leader before election
Dick Saslaw
Democratic
Elected Majority Leader
Scott Surovell
Democratic

The 2023 Virginia Senate election was held on Tuesday, November 7, 2023, concurrently with elections for the Virginia House of Delegates, to elect senators to all 40 seats in the Senate of Virginia for the 163rd and 164th Virginia Assembly. Nomination primaries held through the Department of Elections were held June 20, 2023. These were the first elections held following redistricting as a result of the 2020 census. The Democrats retained control of the Senate.

== Background ==
Following the 2019 election, the Democratic Party gained 2 seats in the Senate, and gained control of both chambers of the General Assembly, marking the first time that Democrats held a government trifecta in Virginia since 1993. This was short-lived, however, as Republicans regained the governorship and the House of Delegates in the 2021 elections.

This Senate election as well as those for the House of Delegates were held following the U.S. Supreme Court's decision to overturn Roe v. Wade with the Dobbs v. Jackson Women's Health Organization decision, which ruled that abortion is not a constitutional right in the United States. Governor Glenn Youngkin attempted to sell to the people of Virginia a 15-week "limit" on abortion instead of using the word "ban", fearing such a word to be alienating to swing voters. Youngkin wanted a Republican trifecta to enact a conservative agenda as well, but Democrats were able to out message Youngkin and convince Virginians that his abortion "limit" was a ban.

The Democrats retained their majority in the Senate, dashing Youngkin's hopes of a GOP trifecta even if Republicans retained the House of Delegates, which was also won by Democrats simultaneously, re-establishing full control of the Virginia General Assembly that was lost by Democrats in 2021. After the election, Glenn Youngkin said he would not be a candidate for President of the United States in the presidential election.

== Retirements ==
Nine incumbents did not seek re-election.

=== Republicans ===
1. District 3: Tommy Norment retired.
2. District 23: Steve Newman retired.
3. District 24: Emmett Hanger retired.
4. District 27: Jill Vogel retired.

=== Democrats ===
1. District 6: Lynwood Lewis retired.
2. District 13: John Bell retired.
3. District 21: John Edwards retired.
4. District 32: Janet Howell retired.
5. District 35: Dick Saslaw retired.

== Resignation ==
One seat was left vacant on the day of the general election due to resignation in 2023.

=== Republicans ===
One Republican resigned before the end of his term.

1. District 14: John Cosgrove resigned September 30 to become deputy commissioner of the Virginia Marine Resources Commission. Cosgrove's former chief of staff Christie New Craig won the seat in the general election.

== Incumbents defeated ==
=== In primary election ===
Five incumbent senators, four Democrats and one Republican, were defeated in the June 20 primary election.

==== Democrats ====
1. District 13: Joe Morrissey lost renomination to former state delegate Lashrecse Aird.
2. District 18: Lionell Spruill lost a redistricting race to fellow incumbent Louise Lucas.
3. District 36: George Barker lost renomination to Fairfax County School Board Member Stella Pekarsky.
4. District 37: Chap Petersen lost renomination to financial consultant Saddam Azlan Salim.

==== Republicans ====
1. District 12: Amanda Chase lost renomination to former state senator Glen Sturtevant.

=== In general election ===
==== Democrats ====
1. District 24: Monty Mason lost re-election to former York-Poquoson Sheriff Danny Diggs.

==== Republicans ====
1. District 16: Siobhan Dunnavant lost re-election to State Delegate Schuyler VanValkenburg.

== Newly created seats ==
=== Democratic gain ===
1. District 21: Won by State Delegate Angelia Williams Graves
2. District 30: Won by State Delegate Danica Roem
3. District 31: Won by prosecutor Russet Perry
4. District 32: Won by State Delegate Suhas Subramanyam
5. District 33: Won by former state delegate Jennifer Carroll Foy

=== Republican gain ===
1. District 1: Won by farmer Timmy French
2. District 3: Won by State Delegate Chris Head
3. District 10: Won by State Delegate John McGuire
4. District 17: Won by State Delegate Emily Brewer
5. District 27: Won by State Delegate Tara Durant

== Special elections ==
=== District 38 ===
Incumbent Republican Ben Chafin, first elected in 2014, died on January 1, 2021.

2021 Virginia Senate 38th District special election
- March 23, 2021

Virginia's 38th Senate district
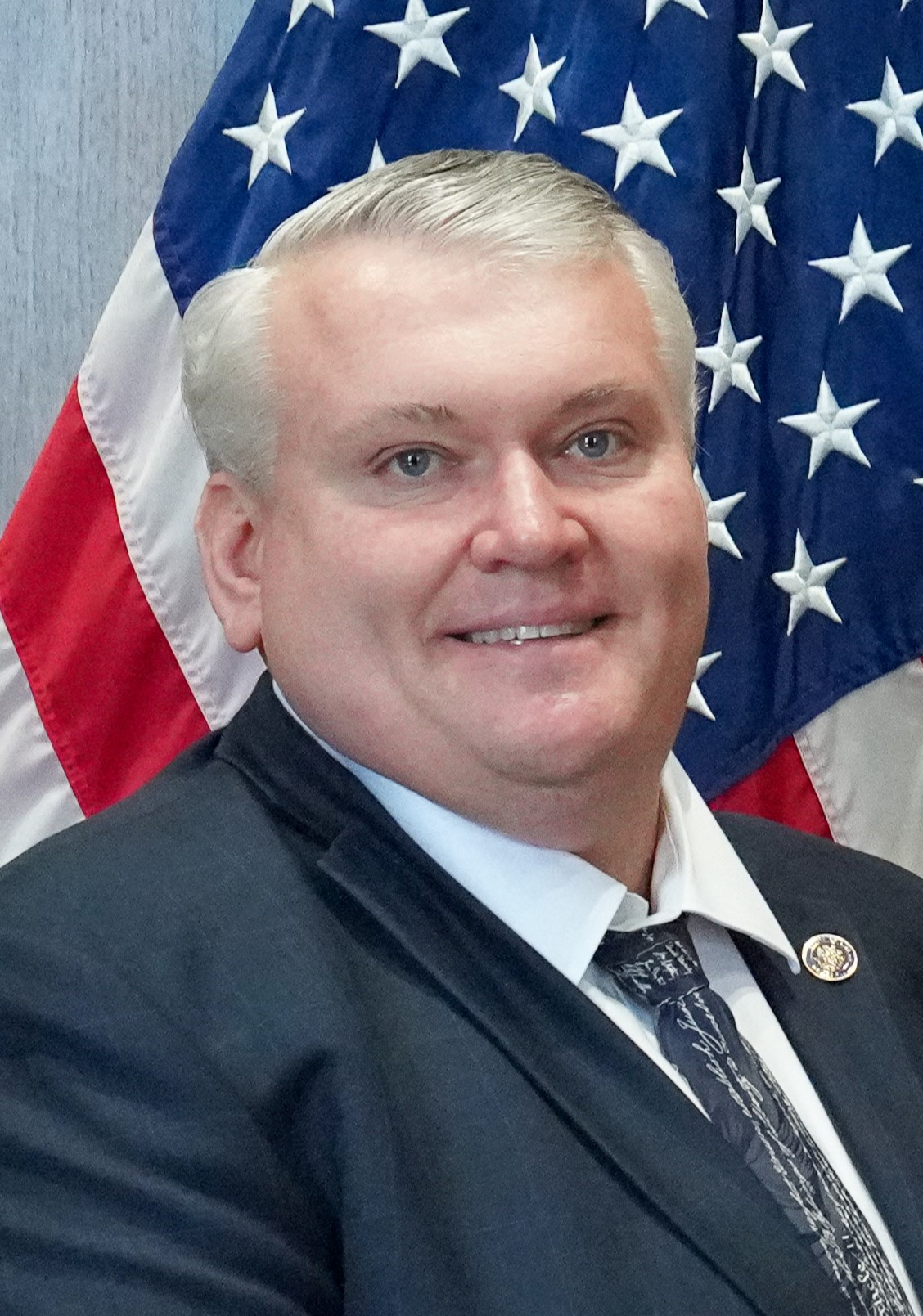
Candidate	Travis Hackworth	Laurie Buchwald
Party	Republican	Democratic
Popular vote	18,100	5,629
Percentage	76.2%	23.7%
- County and independent city results Hackworth: 60–70% 70–80% 80–90% Buchwald: 50–60%
State senator before election
Ben Chafin
Republican
Elected State senator
Travis Hackworth
Republican

Virginia's 38th Senate district, 2021 special election
Party	Candidate	Votes	%
Republican	Travis Hackworth	18,100	76.2
Democratic	Laurie A. Buchwald	5,629	23.7
Write-in		39	0.1
Total votes		23,768	100.0
Republican hold			

=== District 7 ===
2023 Virginia Senate 7th District special election
- January 10, 2023

Virginia's 7th Senate district
- Turnout: 25%
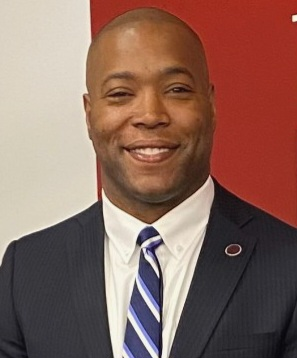

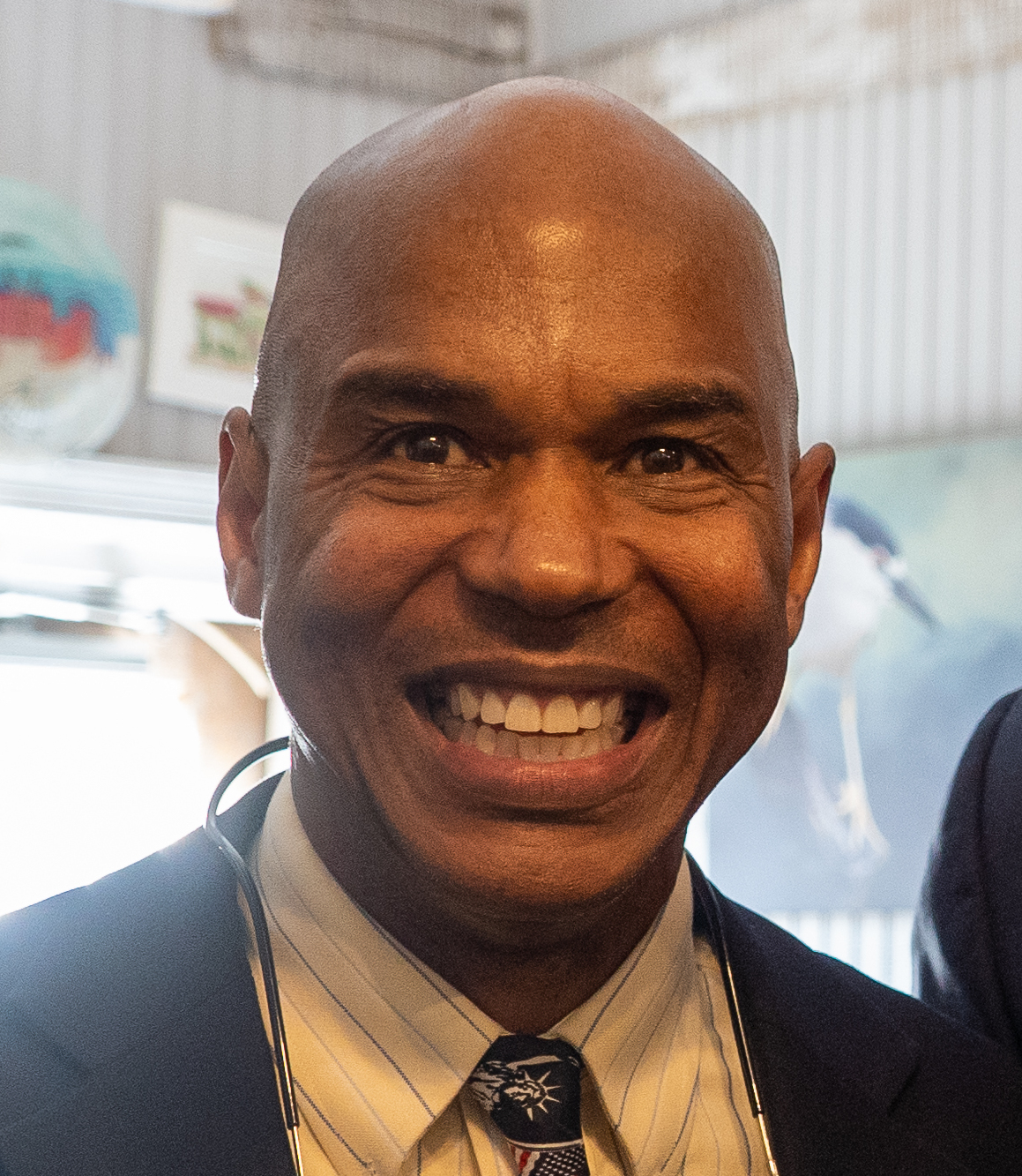
Candidate	Aaron Rouse	Kevin H. Adams
Party	Democratic	Republican
Popular vote	19,923	19,227
Percentage	50.84%	49.07%
- Precinct results Rouse: 50–60% 60–70% 70–80% 80–90% Adams: 50–60% 60–70%
State senator before election
Jen Kiggans
Republican
Elected State senator
Aaron Rouse
Democratic

Incumbent Republican Jen Kiggans, first elected in 2019, resigned on November 15, 2022, to take office as U.S. representative for Virginia's 2nd congressional district.

Virginia's 7th Senate district, 2023 special election
Party	Candidate	Votes	%
Democratic	Aaron Rouse	19,923	50.84
Republican	Kevin Adams	19,227	49.07
Write-in		34	.09
Total votes		39,150	100.0
Democratic gain from Republican			

=== District 9 ===
2023 Virginia Senate 9th District special election
- March 28, 2023

Virginia's 9th Senate district
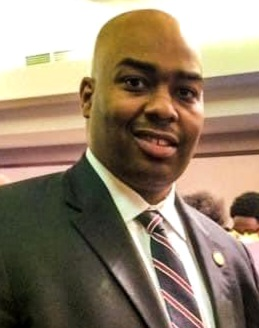

Candidate	Lamont Bagby	Steve Imholt
Party	Democratic	Republican
Popular vote	13,552	1,495
Percentage	89.8%	9.9%
- County and independent city results Bagby: 70–80% 80–90% >90%
State senator before election
Jennifer McClellan
Democratic
Elected State senator
Lamont Bagby
Democratic

Democrat Jennifer McClellan, first elected in 2017, resigned on March 7, 2023, to take office as the U.S. representative for Virginia's 4th congressional district. Lamont Bagby won the special election to take the seat.

Democratic firehouse primary results
Party	Candidate	Votes	%
Democratic	Lamont Bagby	4,726	72.4
Democratic	Alexsis Rodgers	1,375	21.1
Democratic	Dawn Adams	424	6.5
Total votes		6,525	100.0

2023 Virginia Senate special election, District 9
Party	Candidate	Votes	%
Democratic	Lamont Bagby	13,552	89.8
Republican	Steve Imholt	1,495	9.9
Write-in		37	0.3
Total votes		15,084	100
Democratic hold			

== Overview ==
Party		Candidates	Votes		Seats		
Party		Candidates	No.	%	Before	After	+/–
	Democratic	37	1,229,331	49.84%	22	21	▼1
	Republican	37	1,193,583	48.39%	17 (Note: Includes one non-caucusing Republican senator, Amanda Chase.)	19	▲2
-	Write-ins	-	28,863	1.17%	0	0	
	Independent	3	13,500	0.55%	0	0	
	Libertarian	1	1,108	0.04%	0	0	
Total			2,466,385	100.00	40	40	

=== Close races ===
Seats where the margin of victory was under 10%:

1. Senate District 24, 1.07% gain
2. Senate District 27, 1.76%
3. Senate District 30, 3.83%
4. Senate District 17, 4.82%
5. Senate District 31, 5.7%
6. Senate District 4, 6.65%
7. Senate District 16, 9.51% gain
8. Senate District 12, 9.7%

== Predictions ==
Source	Ranking	As of
270toWin	Lean D	November 2, 2023
Elections Daily	Lean D	November 2, 2023
CNalysis	Lean D	November 7, 2023

== Results summary by Virginia Senate district ==
District	Incumbent	Party	Elected senator	Party
1	New seat		Timmy French	Rep
2	Mark Obenshain (Note: Redistricted from the 26th district.)	Rep	Mark Obenshain	Rep
2	Emmett Hanger (Note: Redistricted from the 24th district.)	Rep	Mark Obenshain	Rep
3	New seat		Chris Head	Rep
4	David Suetterlein (Note: Redistricted from the 19th district.)	Rep	David Suetterlein	Rep
4	John Edwards (Note: Redistricted from the 21st district.)	Dem	David Suetterlein	Rep
5	Travis Hackworth (Note: Redistricted from the 38th district.)	Rep	Travis Hackworth	Rep
6	Todd Pillion (Note: Redistricted from the 40th district.)	Rep	Todd Pillion	Rep
7	Bill Stanley (Note: Redistricted from the 20th district.)	Rep	Bill Stanley	Rep
8	Mark Peake (Note: Redistricted from the 22nd district.)	Rep	Mark Peake	Rep
8	Stephen Newman (Note: Redistricted from the 23rd district.)	Rep	Mark Peake	Rep
9	Frank Ruff (Note: Redistricted from the 15th district.)	Rep	Frank Ruff	Rep
10	New seat		John McGuire	Rep
11	Creigh Deeds (Note: Redistricted from the 25th district.)	Dem	Creigh Deeds	Dem
12	Amanda Chase (Note: Redistricted from the 11th district.)	Rep (Note: Senator Amanda Chase is a Republican who does not caucus with the Virginia Republican Party.)	Glen Sturtevant	Rep
13	Joe Morrissey (Note: Redistricted from the 16th district.)	Dem	Lashrecse Aird	Dem
14	Lamont Bagby (Note: Redistricted from the 9th district.)	Dem	Lamont Bagby	Dem
15	Ghazala Hashmi (Note: Redistricted from the 10th district.)	Dem	Ghazala Hashmi	Dem
16	Siobhan Dunnavant (Note: Redistricted from the 12th district.)	Rep	Schuyler VanValkenburg	Dem
17	New seat		Emily Brewer	Rep
18	Louise Lucas	Dem	Louise Lucas	Dem
18	Lionell Spruill (Note: Redistricted from the 5th district.)	Dem	Louise Lucas	Dem
19	Vacant (Note: Redistricted from the 14th district. Republican Senator John Cosgrove resigned his seat on September 30, 2023.)		Christie Craig	Rep
20	Bill DeSteph (Note: Redistricted from the 8th district.)	Rep	Bill DeSteph	Rep
20	Lynwood Lewis (Note: Redistricted from the 6th district.)	Dem	Bill DeSteph	Rep
21	New seat		Angelia Graves	Dem
22	Aaron Rouse (Note: Redistricted from the 7th district.)	Dem	Aaron Rouse	Dem
23	Mamie Locke (Note: Redistricted from the 2nd district.)	Dem	Mamie Locke	Dem
24	Monty Mason (Note: Redistricted from the 1st district.)	Dem	Danny Diggs	Rep
25	Richard Stuart (Note: Redistricted from the 28th district.)	Rep	Richard Stuart	Rep
26	Ryan McDougle (Note: Redistricted from the 4th district.)	Rep	Ryan McDougle	Rep
26	Tommy Norment	Rep	Ryan McDougle	Rep
27	New seat		Tara Durant	Rep
28	Bryce Reeves (Note: Redistricted from the 17th district.)	Rep	Bryce Reeves	Rep
29	Jeremy McPike	Dem	Jeremy McPike	Dem
30	New seat		Danica Roem	Dem
31	Jill Vogel (Note: Redistricted from the 27th district.)	Rep	Russet Perry	Dem
32	John Bell (Note: Redistricted from the 13th district.)	Dem	Suhas Subramanyam	Dem
33	New seat		Jennifer Carroll Foy	Dem
34	Scott Surovell (Note: Redistricted from the 36th district.)	Dem	Scott Surovell	Dem
35	Dick Saslaw	Dem	Dave Marsden	Dem
35	Dave Marsden (Note: Redistricted from the 37th district.)	Dem	Dave Marsden	Dem
36	George Barker (Note: Redistricted from the 39th district.)	Dem	Stella Pekarsky	Dem
37	Chap Petersen (Note: Redistricted from the 34th district.)	Dem	Saddam Azlan Salim	Dem
38	Jennifer Boysko (Note: Redistricted from the 33rd district.)	Dem	Jennifer Boysko	Dem
38	Janet Howell (Note: Redistricted from the 32nd district.)	Dem	Jennifer Boysko	Dem
39	Adam Ebbin (Note: Redistricted from the 30th district.)	Dem	Adam Ebbin	Dem
40	Barbara Favola (Note: Redistricted from the 31st district.)	Dem	Barbara Favola	Dem

== Polling ==
Poll source	Date(s) administered	Sample size size (Note: Key: A – all adults RV – registered voters LV – likely voters V – unclear)	Margin of error	Democratic Party	Republican Party	Other / Undecided
Virginia Commonwealth University	July 14–25, 2023	804 (A)	± 5.46%	44%	44%	12%

== District 1 ==
2023 Virginia Senate 1st District election
- November 7, 2023
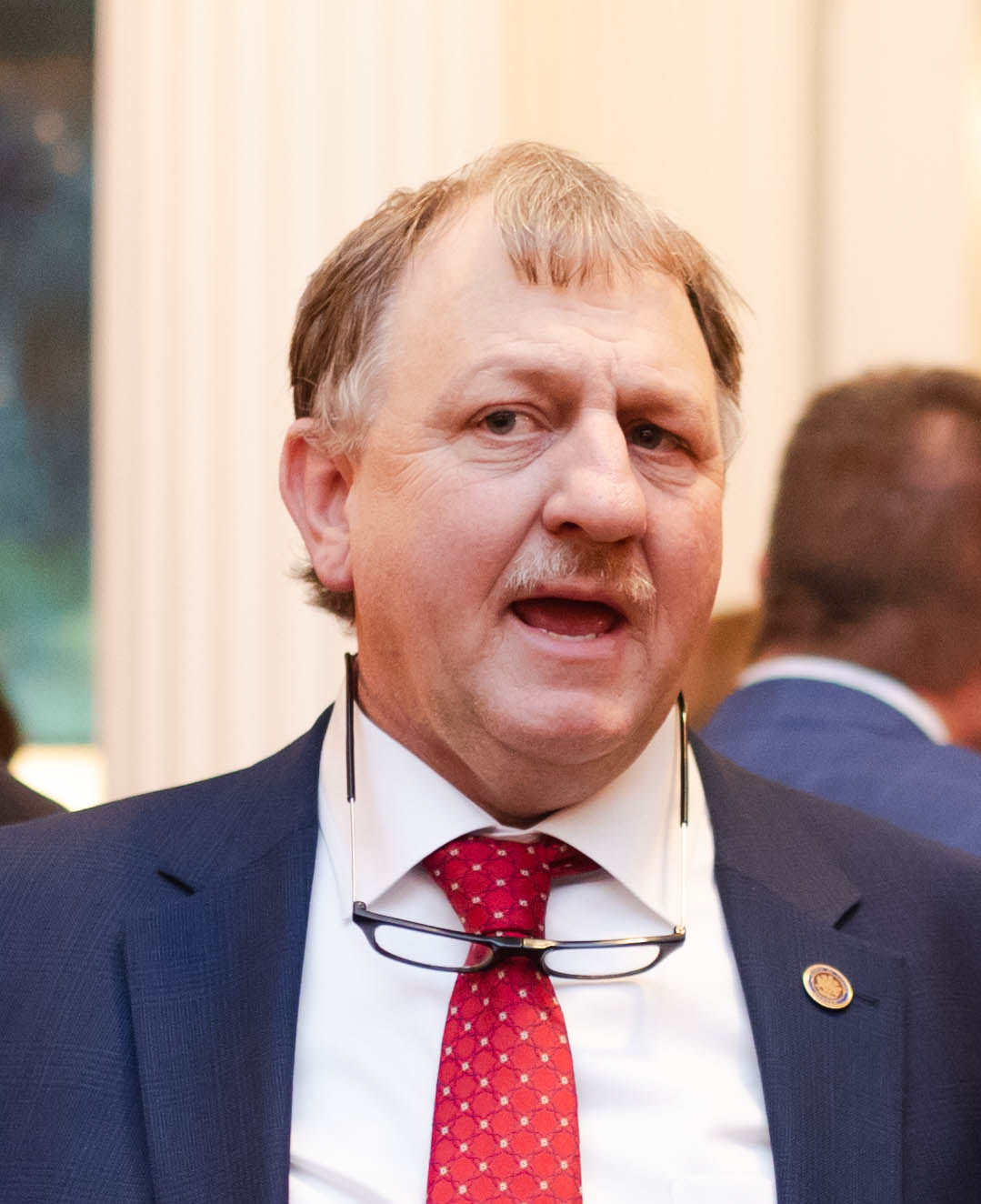

Candidate	Timmy French	Emily Scott
Party	Republican	Democratic
Popular vote	37,453	21,334
Percentage	58.2%	33.2%
- Precinct results French: 30–40% 40–50% 50–60% 60–70% 70–80% Scott: 40–50% 50–60% 60–70%
State senator before election
OPEN
Elected State senator
Timmy French
Republican

Senate District 1 contains all of the city of Winchester, Clarke County, Frederick County, Shenandoah County, and Warren County. This was an open seat following redistricting.

=== Republican primary ===
==== Nominee ====
- Timmy French, farmer

==== Defeated in primary ====
- Lance Allen, security company executive and candidate for Lieutenant Governor in 2021
- James Bergida, Christendom College professor
- Blaine Dunn, vice chair of the Frederick County Board of Supervisors and candidate for U.S. Senate in 2020
- Dave LaRock, state delegate
- John Massoud, Strasburg town councilor and nominee for HD-48 in 1997
- Brandon Monk, Frederick County school board member
- Brad Pollack, Shenandoah County supervisor

==== Failed to qualify ====
- Robert Hupman, farmer

==== Results ====
Virginia's 1st Senate District, 2023 Republican primary
Party	Candidate	Votes	%
Republican	Timmy French	5,681	32.90%
Republican	Dave LaRock	4,409	25.53%
Republican	Brandon Monk	2,086	12.08%
Republican	James Bergida	1,940	11.23%
Republican	John Massoud	1,437	8.32%
Republican	Lance Allen	908	5.26%
Republican	Bradley Pollack	435	2.52%
Republican	Blaine Dunn	373	2.16%
Total votes		17,269	100.00%

=== Democratic primary ===
==== Nominee ====
- Emily Scott, labor union employee and nominee for HD-15 in 2021

=== General election ===
Predictions

Source	Ranking	As of
Elections Daily	Safe R	November 6, 2023
CNalysis	Solid R	September 8, 2023

Virginia's 1st Senate District, 2023 general election
Party	Candidate	Votes	%
Republican	Timmy French	37,453	58.23
Democratic	Emily Scott	21,334	33.17
Write-in		5,535	8.61%
Total votes		64,322	100.00%
Republican win (new seat)			

== District 2 ==
2023 Virginia Senate 2nd District election
- November 7, 2023
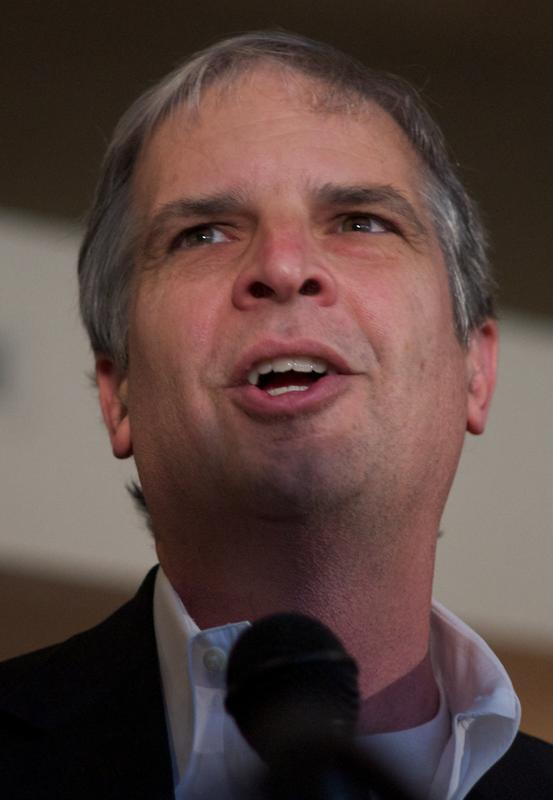

Candidate	Mark Obenshain	Kathy Beery
Party	Republican	Democratic
Popular vote	39,770	16,398
Percentage	69.4%	28.6%
- Precinct results Obenshain: 50–60% 60–70% 70–80% 80–90% >90% Beery: 50–60% 60–70% 70–80%
State senator before election
Mark Obenshain
Republican
Emmett Hanger
Republican
Elected State senator
Mark Obenshain
Republican

Senate District 2 contains all of the city of Harrisonburg, Bath County, Highland County, Page County, and Rockingham County, as well as portions of Augusta County. This district had two incumbents following redistricting: Republicans Emmett Hanger, who was first elected in 1995, and Mark Obenshain, who was first elected in 2003.

=== Republican primary ===
==== Nominee ====
- Mark Obenshain, incumbent senator

==== Declined ====
- Emmett Hanger, incumbent senator

=== Democratic primary ===
==== Nominee ====
- Kathy Beery, retired teacher

=== Libertarian primary ===
==== Nominee ====
- Joshua Huffman, political scientist

=== General election ===
Predictions

Source	Ranking	As of
Elections Daily	Safe R	November 6, 2023
CNalysis	Solid R	September 8, 2023

Virginia's 2nd Senate District, 2023 general election
Party	Candidate	Votes	%
Republican	Mark Obenshain (incumbent)	39,770	69.36%
Democratic	Kathy Beery	16,398	28.60%
Libertarian	Joshua Huffman	1,108	1.93%
Write-in		60	0.10%
Total votes		57,336	100.00%
Republican hold			

== District 3 ==
2023 Virginia Senate 3rd District election
- November 7, 2023
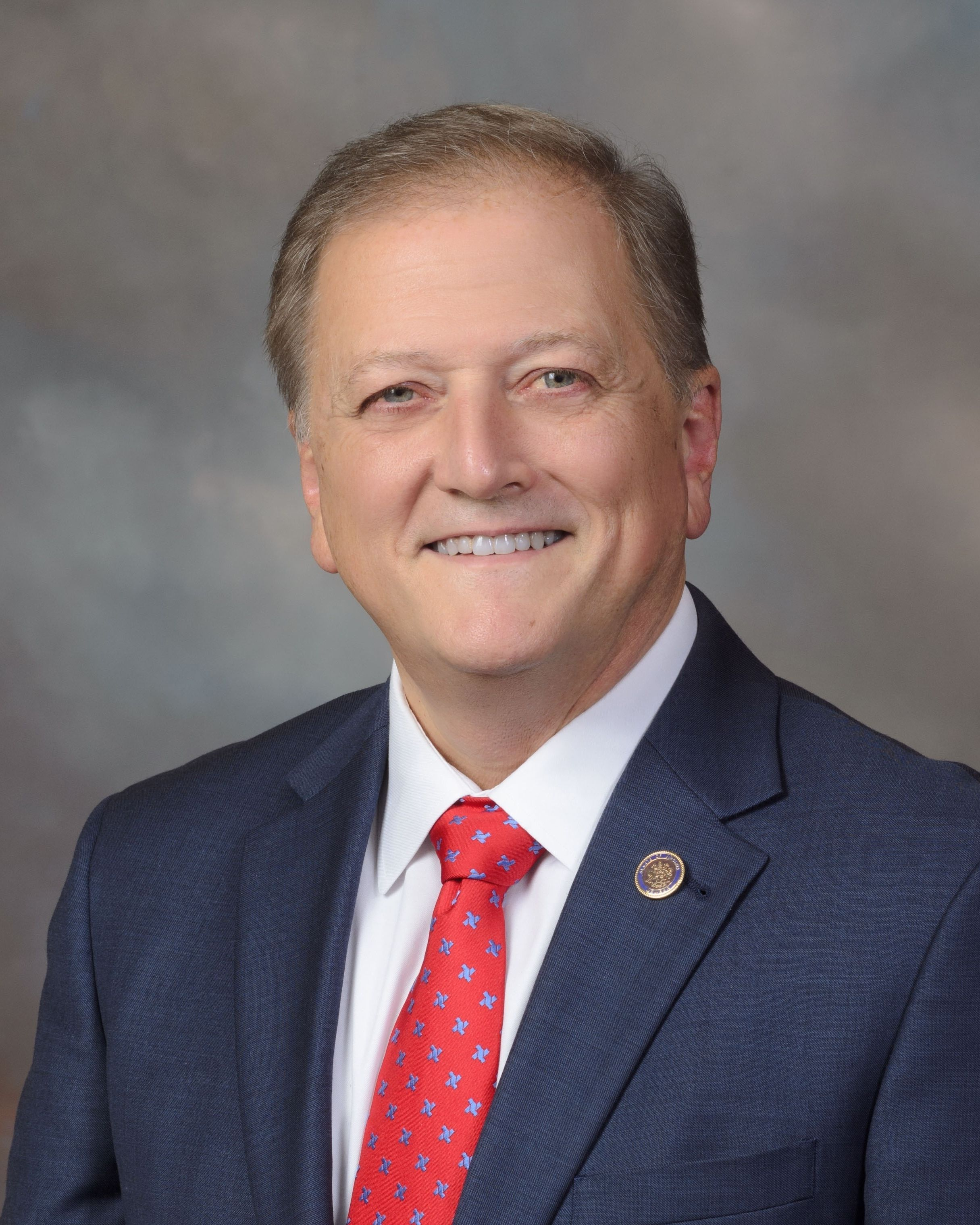

Candidate	Chris Head	Jade Harris
Party	Republican	Democratic
Popular vote	41,381	21,353
Percentage	65.9%	34.0%
- Precinct results Head: 50–60% 60–70% 70–80% 80–90% Harris: 50–60% 60–70% 70–80% >90%
State senator before election
OPEN
Elected State senator
Chris Head
Republican

Senate District 3 contains all of the cities of Buena Vista, Covington, Lexington, Staunton, Waynesboro, Alleghany County, Botetourt County, Craig County, and Rockbridge County, as well as portions of Augusta County and Roanoke County. This was an open seat following redistricting.

=== Republican primary ===
==== Nominee ====
- Chris Head, state delegate for HD-03 (2012–present)

==== Declined ====
- Emmett Hanger, incumbent senator

=== Democratic primary ===
==== Nominee ====
- Jade Harris, former vice mayor of Glasgow and nominee for HD-24 in the 2023 special election

=== General election ===
Predictions

Source	Ranking	As of
Elections Daily	Safe R	November 6, 2023
CNalysis	Solid R	September 8, 2023

Virginia's 3rd Senate District, 2023 general election
Party	Candidate	Votes	%
Republican	Chris Head	41,381	65.88%
Democratic	Jade Harris	21,353	33.99%
Write-in		83	0.13%
Total votes		62,817	100.00%
Republican win (new seat)			

== District 4 ==
2023 Virginia Senate 4th District election
- November 7, 2023
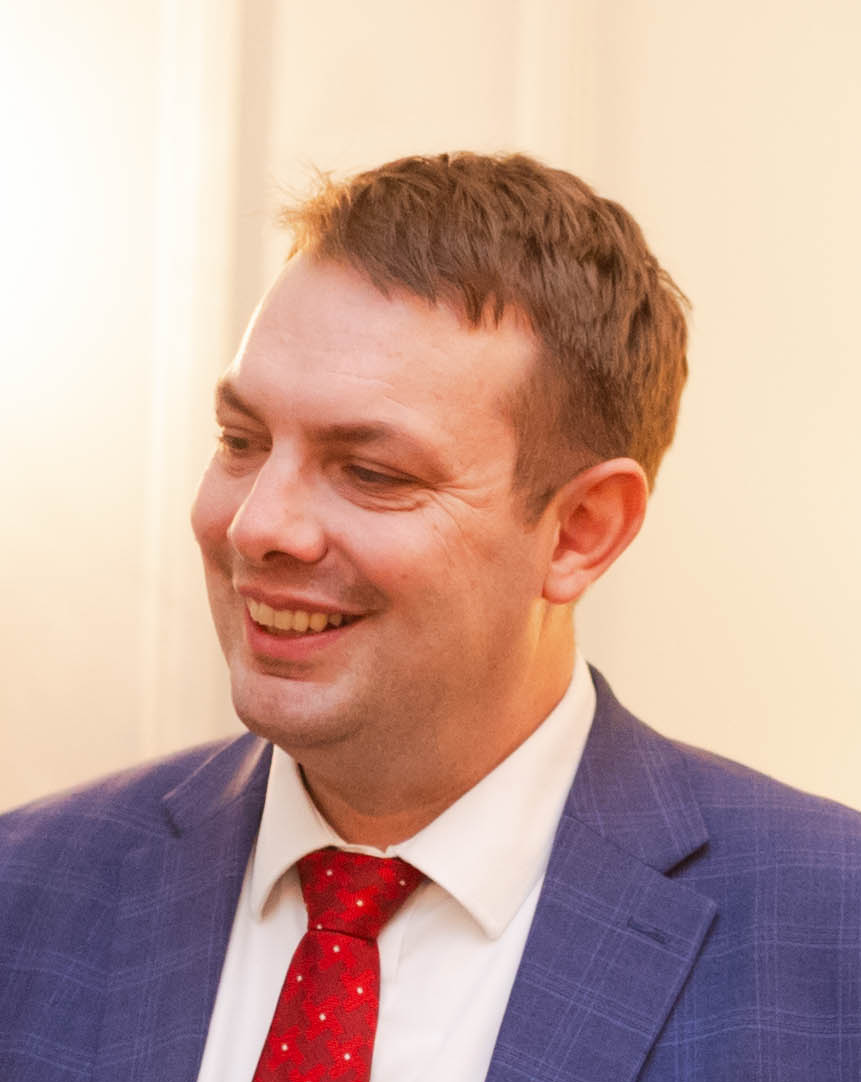

Candidate	David Suetterlein	Trish White-Boyd
Party	Republican	Democratic
Popular vote	32,127	28,108
Percentage	53.2%	46.6%
- Precinct results Suetterlein: 50–60% 60–70% 70–80% White-Boyd: 50–60% 60–70% 70–80% 80–90% >90%
State senator before election
John Edwards
Democratic
David Suetterlein
Republican
Elected State senator
David Suetterlein
Republican

Senate District 4 contains the entire cities of Roanoke and Salem, as well as portions of Roanoke County and Montgomery County. This district had two incumbents following redistricting: Democrat John Edwards, who was first elected in 1995, and Republican Dave Suetterlein, who was first elected in 2015.

=== Democratic primary ===
==== Nominee ====
- Trish White-Boyd, Roanoke city councilor

==== Defeated in primary ====
- D.A. Pierce, U.S. Air Force veteran
- Luke Priddy, Roanoke city councilor and chief of staff to outgoing State Sen. John Edwards

==== Declined ====
- John Edwards, incumbent senator from SD-21

==== Endorsements ====
Luke Priddy

State legislators

- John Edwards, state senator from SD-21 (1996-present)

==== Results ====
County and independent city results White-Boyd: 50–60%

Virginia's 4th Senate District, 2023 Democratic primary
Party	Candidate	Votes	%
Democratic	Trish White-Boyd	4,138	57.15%
Democratic	Luke Priddy	2,746	37.92%
Democratic	DeAnthony "D. A." Pierce	357	4.93%
Total votes		7,241	100.00%

=== Republican primary ===
==== Nominee ====
- Dave Suetterlein, incumbent senator

=== General election ===
Predictions

Source	Ranking	As of
Elections Daily	Solid R (flip)	November 6, 2023
CNalysis	Likely R (flip)	September 8, 2023

==== Endorsements ====
Trish Boyd-White

Organizations

- Sierra Club
- Virginia AFL-CIO

Virginia's 4th Senate District, 2023 general election
Party	Candidate	Votes	%
Republican	Dave Suetterlein (incumbent)	32,127	53.22%
Democratic	Trish White-Boyd	28,108	46.57%
Write-in		126	0.21%
Total votes		60,362	100.00%
Republican hold			

== District 5 ==
2023 Virginia Senate 5th District election
- November 7, 2023
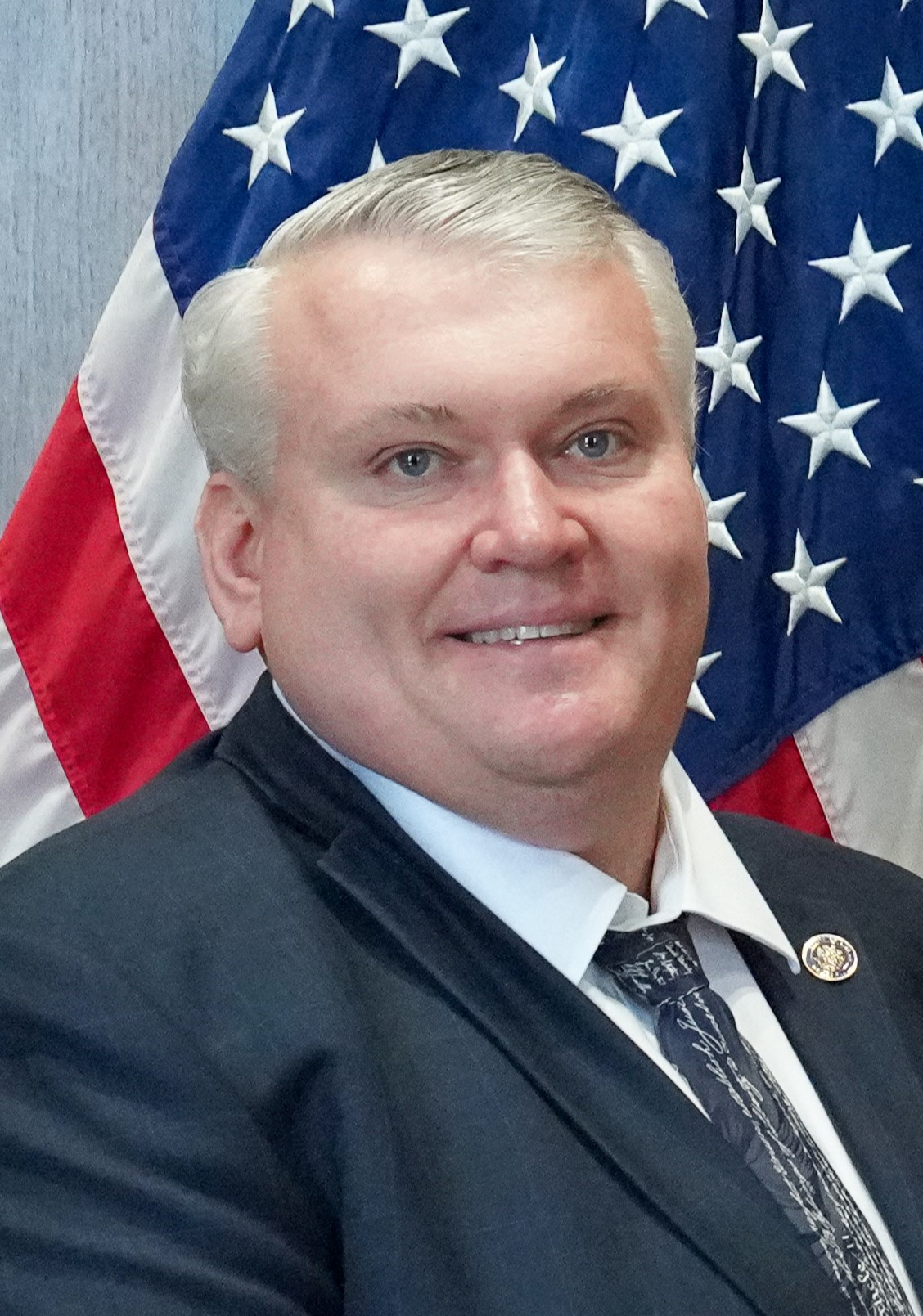

Candidate	Travis Hackworth	Robert Beckman
Party	Republican	Democratic
Popular vote	36,528	18,092
Percentage	66.8%	33.1%
- Precinct results Hackworth: 50–60% 60–70% 70–80% 80–90% >90% Beckman: 50–60% 60–70% 70–80% 80–90% >90%
State senator before election
Travis Hackworth
Republican
Elected State senator
Travis Hackworth
Republican

Senate District 5 contains all of the city of Radford, Bland County, Giles County, Pulaski County, Smyth County, and Tazewell County, as well as portions of Montgomery County and Wythe County. The incumbent was Republican Travis Hackworth, who was first elected in 2021.

=== Republican primary ===
==== Nominee ====
- Travis Hackworth, incumbent senator

=== Democratic primary ===
==== Nominee ====
- Robert Beckman

=== General election ===
Predictions

Source	Ranking	As of
Elections Daily	Safe R	November 6, 2023
CNalysis	Solid R	September 8, 2023

Virginia's 5th Senate District, 2023 general election
Party	Candidate	Votes	%
Republican	Travis Hackworth (incumbent)	36,528	66.78%
Democratic	Robert Beckman	18,092	33.07%
Write-in		80	0.15%
Total votes		54,700	100.00%
Republican hold			

== District 6 ==
2023 Virginia Senate 6th District election
- November 7, 2023
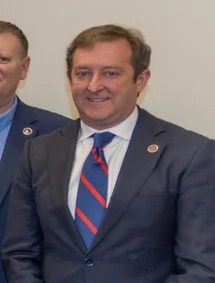
Candidate	Todd Pillion
Party	Republican
Popular vote	43,641
Percentage	97.1%
- Precinct results Pillion: 80–90% >90%
State senator before election
Todd Pillion
Republican
Elected State senator
Todd Pillion
Republican

Senate District 6 contains all of the cities of Bristol, Norton, Buchanan County, Dickenson County, Lee County, Russell County, Scott County, Washington County, and Wise County. The incumbent was Republican Todd Pillion, who was first elected in 2019.

=== Republican primary ===
==== Nominee ====
- Todd Pillion, incumbent senator

=== General election ===
Predictions

Source	Ranking	As of
Elections Daily	Safe R	November 6, 2023
CNalysis	Safe R	September 8, 2023

Virginia's 6th Senate District, 2023 general election
Party	Candidate	Votes	%
Republican	Todd Pillion (incumbent)	43,641	97.10%
Write-in		1,302	2.90%
Total votes		44,943	100.00%
Republican hold			

== District 7 ==
2023 Virginia Senate 7th District election
- November 7, 2023
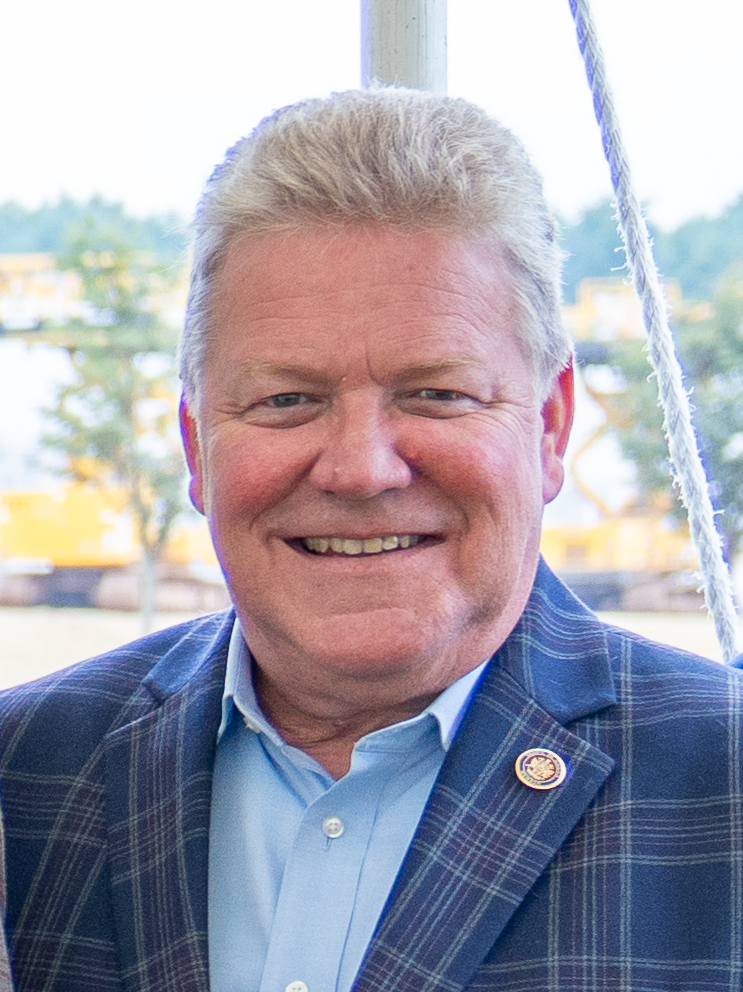

Candidate	Bill Stanley	Deborah "Renie" Gates
Party	Republican	Democratic
Popular vote	43,158	13,794
Percentage	75.2%	24.2%
- County and independent city results Stanley : 50–60% 60–70% 70–80% 80–90% Gates: 50–60% 60–70% >90%
State senator before election
Bill Stanley
Republican
Elected State senator
Bill Stanley
Republican

Senate District 7 contains the entire cities of Galax, Martinsville, Carroll County, Floyd County, Franklin County, Grayson County, Henry County, and Patrick County, as well as portions of Wythe County. The incumbent was Republican Bill Stanley, who was first elected in 2011.

=== Republican primary ===
==== Nominee ====
- Bill Stanley, incumbent senator

=== Democratic primary ===
==== Nominee ====
- Deborah "Renie" Gates, attorney

=== General election ===
Predictions

Source	Ranking	As of
Elections Daily	Safe R	November 6, 2023
CNalysis	Solid R	September 8, 2023

Virginia's 7th Senate District, 2023 general election
Party	Candidate	Votes	%
Republican	Bill Stanley (incumbent)	43,158	75.71%
Democratic	Deborah "Renie" Gates	13,794	24.20%
Write-in		55	0.10%
Total votes		57,007	100.00%
Republican hold			

== District 8 ==
2023 Virginia Senate 8th District election
- November 7, 2023
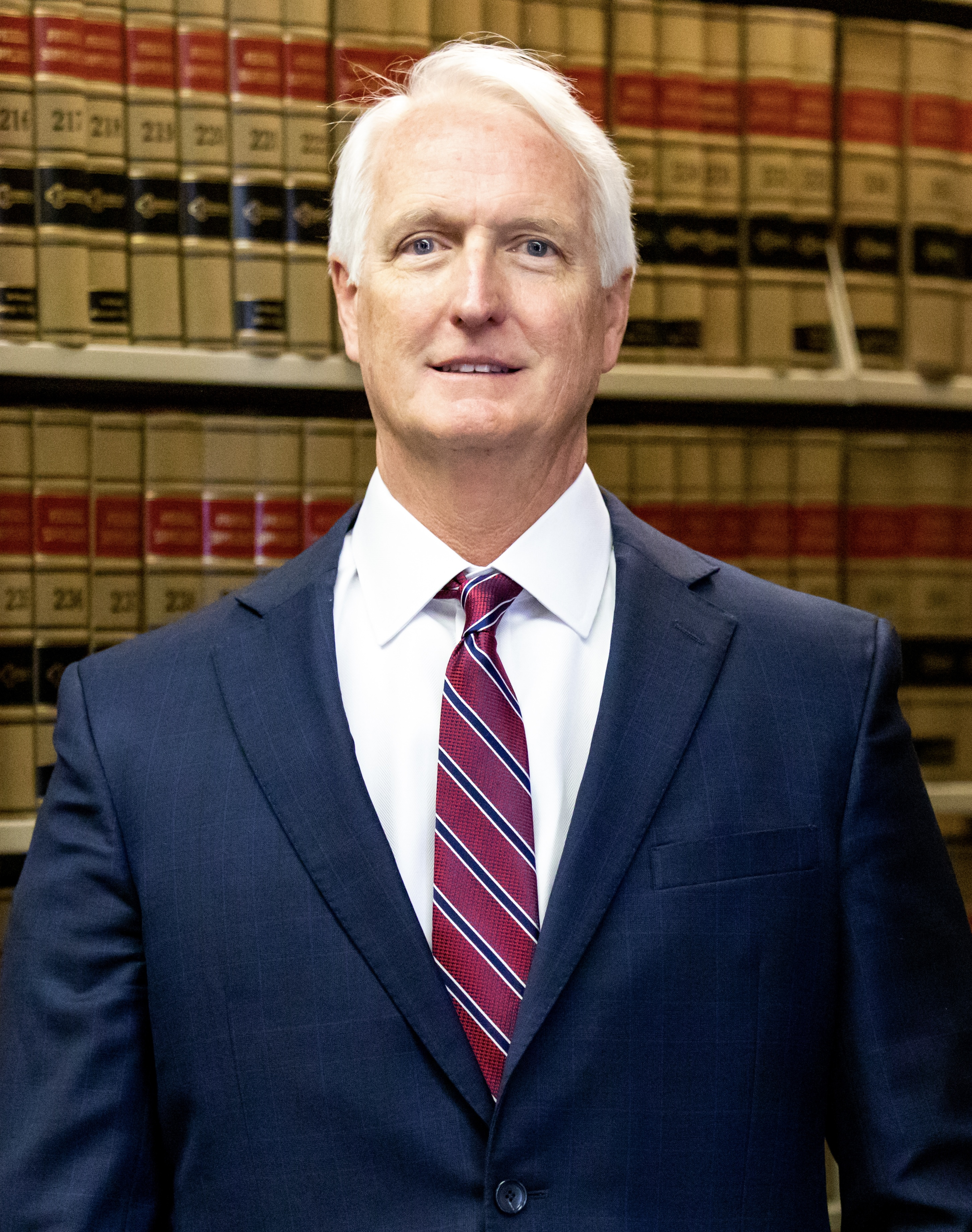

Candidate	Mark Peake	Donna St. Clair
Party	Republican	Democratic
Popular vote	41,754	17,744
Percentage	70.1%	29.8%
- Precinct results Peake: 50–60% 60–70% 70–80% 80–90% >90% St. Clair: 40–50% 50–60% 60–70% 70–80%
State senator before election
Stephen Newman
Republican
Mark Peake
Republican
Elected State senator
Mark Peake
Republican

Senate District 8 contains the entire city of Lynchburg, Bedford County, and Campbell County. This seat had two incumbents following redistricting: Republican Stephen Newman, who was first elected in 1995, and Republican Mark Peake, who was first elected in 2017.

=== Republican primary ===
==== Nominee ====
- Mark Peake, incumbent senator

==== Declined ====
- Stephen Newman, incumbent senator

=== Democratic primary ===
==== Nominee ====
- Donna StClair, retired teacher

=== General election ===
Predictions

Source	Ranking	As of
Elections Daily	Safe R	November 6, 2023
CNalysis	Solid R	September 8, 2023

Virginia's 8th Senate District, 2023 general election
Party	Candidate	Votes	%
Republican	Mark Peake (incumbent)	41,754	70.10%
Democratic	Donna St. Clair	17,744	29.79%
Write-in		68	0.11%
Total votes		59,566	100.00%
Republican hold			

== District 9 ==
2023 Virginia Senate 9th District election
- November 7, 2023
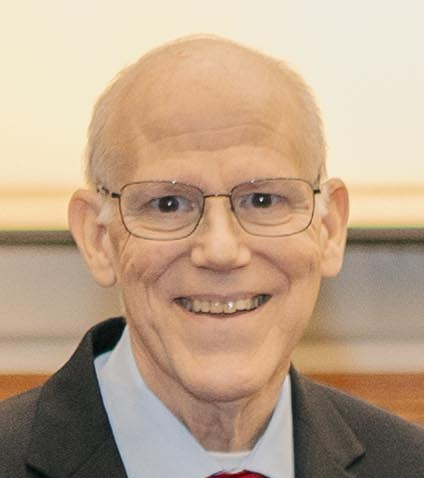
Candidate	Frank Ruff
Party	Republican
Popular vote	41,877
Percentage	92.6%
- Precinct results Ruff: 50–60% 60–70% 70–80% 80–90% >90%
State senator before election
Frank Ruff
Republican
Elected State senator
Frank Ruff
Republican

Senate District 9 contains the entire city of Danville, Charlotte County, Halifax County, Lunenburg County, Mecklenburg County, Nottoway County, and Pittsylvania County, as well as portions of Prince Edward County. The incumbent was Republican Frank Ruff, who was first elected in 2000.

=== Republican primary ===
==== Nominee ====
- Frank Ruff, incumbent senator

=== Democratic primary ===
==== Failed to qualify ====
- Trudy Berry, U.S. Air Force veteran and nominee for HD-61 in 2019 and 2021

=== General election ===
Predictions

Source	Ranking	As of
Elections Daily	Safe R	November 6, 2023
CNalysis	Safe R	September 8, 2023

Virginia's 9th Senate District, 2023 general election
Party	Candidate	Votes	%
Republican	Frank Ruff (incumbent)	41,877	92.58%
Write-in		3,354	7.42%
Total votes		45,231	100.00%
Republican hold			

== District 10 ==
2023 Virginia Senate 10th District election
- November 7, 2023
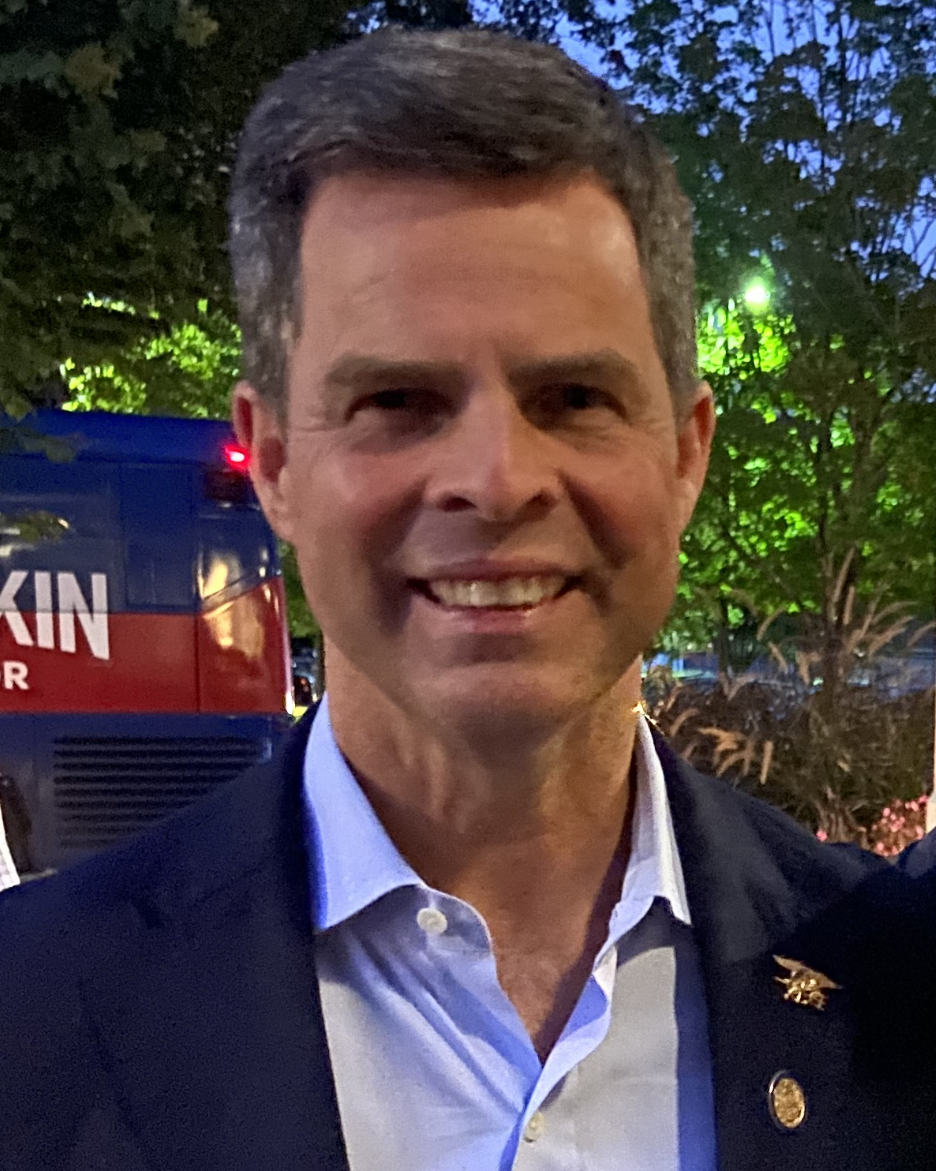
Candidate	John McGuire
Party	Republican
Popular vote	59,013
Percentage	91.2%
- Precinct results McGuire: 50–60% 70–80% 80–90% >90% No Votes
State senator before election
OPEN
Elected State senator
John McGuire
Republican

Senate District 10 contains all of Amelia County, Appomattox County, Buckingham County, Cumberland County, Fluvanna County, Goochland County, and Powhatan County, as well as portions of Hanover County, Louisa County and Prince Edward County. This was an open seat following redistricting.

=== Republican convention ===
==== Nominee ====
- John McGuire, state delegate

==== Defeated at convention ====
- Duane Adams, Louisa County supervisor
- Sandy Brindley, community activist
- Jack Dyer, businessman

==== Results ====
Total vote tallies were not released publicly.

=== Democratic Primary ===
==== Failed to qualify ====
- Dan Tomlinson

==== Withdrawn ====
- Jacob Boykin, university student

=== General election ===
Predictions

Source	Ranking	As of
Elections Daily	Safe R	November 6, 2023
CNalysis	Safe R	September 8, 2023

Virginia's 10th Senate District, 2023 general election
Party	Candidate	Votes	%
Republican	John McGuire	59,013	91.16%
Write-in		5,721	8.84%
Total votes		64,734	100.00%
Republican win (new seat)			

== District 11 ==
2023 Virginia Senate 11th District election
- November 7, 2023
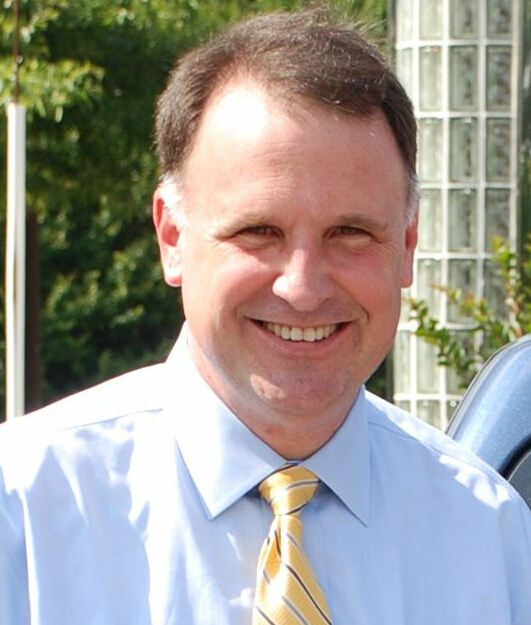

Candidate	Creigh Deeds	Philip Hamilton
Party	Democratic	Republican
Popular vote	48,676	25,416
Percentage	65.6%	34.3%
- Precinct results Deeds: 50–60% 60–70% 70–80% 80–90% >90% Hamilton: 50–60% 60–70% 70–80%
State senator before election
Creigh Deeds
Democratic
Elected State senator
Creigh Deeds
Democratic

Senate District 11 contains the entire city of Charlottesville, Albemarle County, Amherst County, and Nelson County, as well as portions of Louisa County. The incumbent was Democrat Creigh Deeds, who was first elected in 2001.

=== Democratic primary ===
==== Nominee ====
- Creigh Deeds, incumbent senator for SD-25 (2001–present) and nominee for attorney general in 2005 and governor in 2009

==== Eliminated in primary ====
- Sally Hudson, state delegate for HD-57 (2020–present)

==== Endorsements ====
Creigh Deeds

State legislators

- David Toscano, state delegate from the 57th district (2006-2020) and Minority Leader of the Virginia House of Delegates (2011-2018)

Organizations

- Giffords PAC

==== Results ====
Democratic primary results by county/independent city (left) and precinct (right).
Deeds
- 50–60%
- 60–70%
- 70–80%
Hudson
- 50–60%
- 60–70%
- >90%
Tie

Virginia's 11th Senate District, 2023 Democratic primary
Party	Candidate	Votes	%
Democratic	Creigh Deeds (incumbent)	13,623	50.87%
Democratic	Sally Hudson	13,158	49.13%
Total votes		26,781	100.00%

=== Republican primary ===
==== Nominee ====
- Philip Hamilton, activist and nominee for HD-57 in 2021

=== Independents ===
==== Failed to qualify ====
- J'riah Guerrero, public transit employee

=== General election ===
Predictions

Source	Ranking	As of
Elections Daily	Safe D	November 6, 2023
CNalysis	Solid D	September 8, 2023

==== Endorsements ====
Criegh Deeds

Organizations

- Sierra Club

Virginia's 11th Senate District, 2023 general election
Party	Candidate	Votes	%
Democratic	Creigh Deeds (incumbent)	48,676	65.61%
Republican	Philip Hamilton	25,416	34.26%
Write-in		100	0.13%
Total votes		74,192	100.00%
Democratic hold			

== District 12 ==
2023 Virginia Senate 12th District election
- November 7, 2023
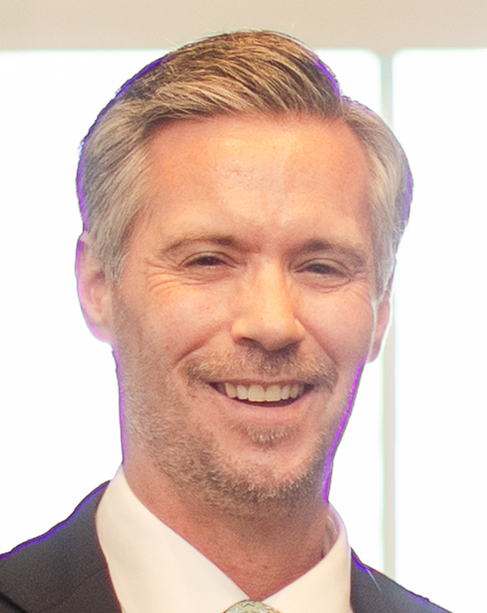

Candidate	Glen Sturtevant	Natan McKenzie
Party	Republican	Democratic
Popular vote	44,597	36,689
Percentage	54.7%	45.0%
- Precinct results Sturtevant: 50–60% 60–70% 70–80% 80–90% McKenzie: 50–60% 60–70% 70–80%
State senator before election
Amanda Chase
Republican
Elected State senator
Glen Sturtevant
Republican

Senate District 12 contains the entire city of Colonial Heights, as well as portions of Chesterfield County. The incumbent was non-caucusing Republican Amanda Chase, who was first elected in 2015.

=== Republican primary ===
==== Nominee ====
- Glen Sturtevant, former state senator for SD-10 (2016–20)

==== Eliminated in primary ====
- Amanda Chase, incumbent senator
- Tina Ramirez, founder of the International Religious Freedom Caucus and candidate for VA-7 in 2020

==== Results ====
County and independent city results Sturtevant: 30–40%; 40–50%

Virginia's 12th Senate District, 2023 Republican primary
Party	Candidate	Votes	%
Republican	Glen Sturtevant	8,578	39.53%
Republican	Amanda Chase (incumbent)	8,203	37.80%
Republican	Tina M. Ramirez	4,920	22.67%
Total votes		21,701	100.00%

=== Democratic primary ===
==== Nominee ====
- Natan McKenzie, businessman

=== General election ===
Predictions

Source	Ranking	As of
Elections Daily	Safe R	November 6, 2023
CNalysis	Solid R	September 8, 2023

==== Endorsements ====
Natan McKenzie

Organizations

- Sierra Club
- Virginia AFL-CIO

Virginia's 12th Senate District, 2023 general election
Party	Candidate	Votes	%
Republican	Glen Sturtevant	44,597	54.72%
Democratic	Natan McKenzie	36,689	45.02%
Write-in		213	0.26%
Total votes		81,499	100.00%
Republican hold			

== District 13 ==
2023 Virginia Senate 13th District election
- November 7, 2023
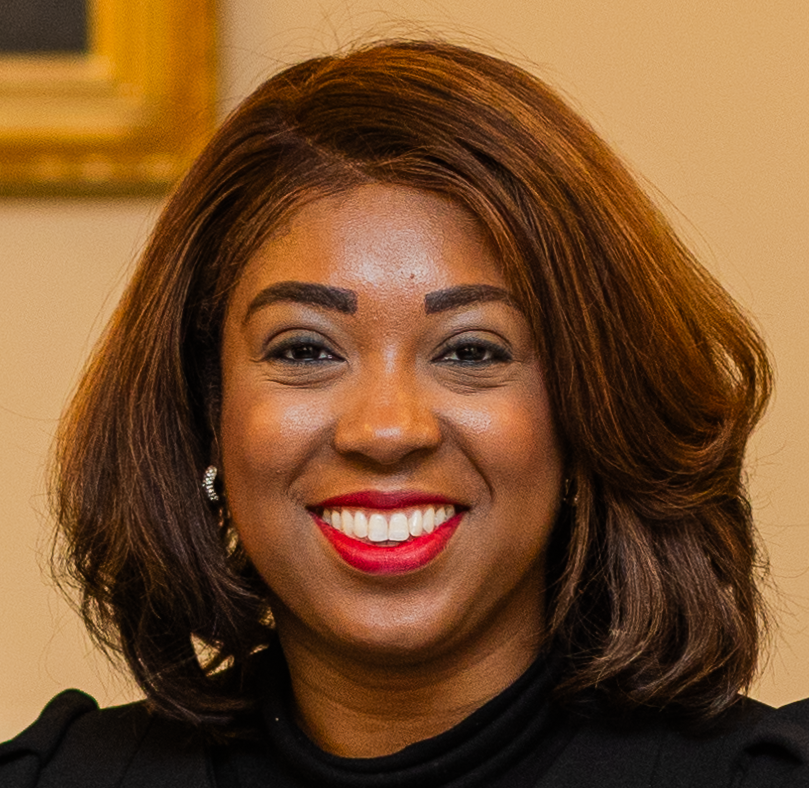

Candidate	Lashrecse Aird	Eric Ditri
Party	Democratic	Republican
Popular vote	35,470	23,725
Percentage	59.8%	40.0%
- Precinct results Aird: 50–60% 60–70% 70–80% 80–90% >90% Ditri: 50–60% 60–70% 70–80% 80–90%
State senator before election
Joe Morrissey
Democratic
Elected State senator
Lashrecse Aird
Democratic

Senate District 13 contains the entire cities of Hopewell, Petersburg, Charles City County, Prince George County, Surry County, and Sussex County, as well as portions of Dinwiddie County and Henrico County.

=== Democratic primary ===
==== Nominee ====
- Lashrecse Aird, former state delegate for HD-63 (2016–22)

==== Eliminated in primary ====
- Joe Morrissey, incumbent senator

==== Withdrawn ====
- Angela Rowe, retired bank executive

==== Endorsements ====
Lashrecse Aird

Federal officials

- Jennifer McClellan, U.S. representative from VA-04 (2023-present)

State legislators

- Jennifer Boysko, state senator for Virginia's 33rd Senate district (2019–present)
- Barbara Favola, state senator for Virginia's 31st Senate district (2012–present)
- Ghazala Hashmi, state senator for Virginia's 10th Senate district (2020–present)
- Janet Howell, state senator for Virginia's 32nd Senate district (1992–present)
- Jay Jones, State Delegate for the 89th district (2018-2021)
- Mamie Locke, state senator for Virginia's 2nd Senate district (2004–present)
- Louise Lucas, president pro tempore of the Virginia Senate (2020–present) and state senator for Virginia's 18th Senate district (1992–present)
- Dave Marsden, state senator for Virginia's 37th Senate district (2010-present)

Organizations

- EMILY's List
- National Organization for Women – Virginia PAC
- People for the American Way
- Virginia Legislative Black Caucus
- Virginia Latino Caucus

==== Results ====
County and independent city results Aird: 60–70%; 70–80%; 80–90%

Virginia's 13th Senate District, 2023 Democratic primary
Party	Candidate	Votes	%
Democratic	Lashrecse Aird	15,297	70.00%
Democratic	Joe Morrissey (incumbent)	6,557	30.00%
Total votes		21,854	100.00%

=== Republican primary ===
==== Nominee ====
- Eric Ditri, corporate financier

=== Independents ===
==== Failed to qualify ====
- Daniel Muniz

=== General election ===
Predictions

Source	Ranking	As of
Elections Daily	Safe D	November 6, 2023
CNalysis	Solid D	September 8, 2023

==== Endorsements ====
Lashrece Aird

Organizations

- Sierra Club
- Virginia AFL-CIO

Virginia's 13th Senate District, 2023 general election
Party	Candidate	Votes	%
Democratic	Lashrecse Aird	35,470	59.82%
Republican	Eric Ditri	23,725	40.01%
Write-in		98	0.17%
Total votes		59,297	100.00%
Democratic hold			

== District 14 ==
2023 Virginia Senate 14th District election
- November 7, 2023
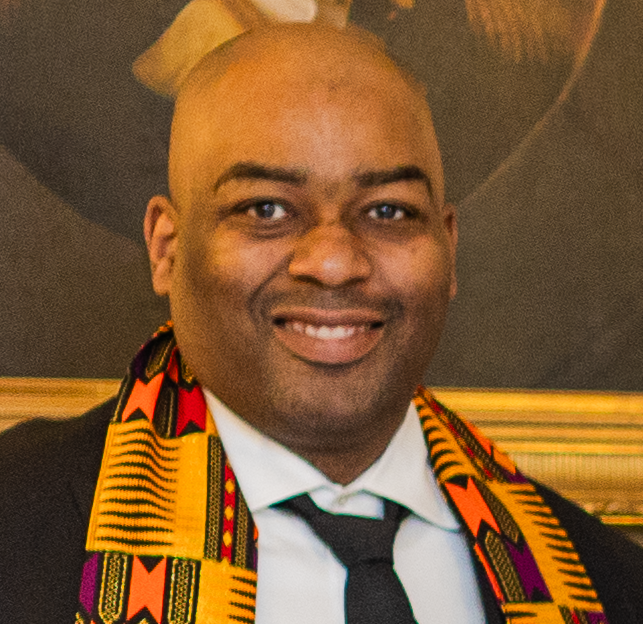
Candidate	Lamont Bagby
Party	Democratic
Popular vote	61,127
Percentage	95.3%
- Precinct results Bagby: 80–90% >90% : No Data
State senator before election
Lamont Bagby
Democratic
Elected State senator
Lamont Bagby
Democratic

Senate District 14 contains portions of the city of Richmond and Henrico County. The incumbent was Democrat Lamont Bagby, who was first elected in 2023.

=== Democratic primary ===
==== Nominee ====
- Lamont Bagby, incumbent senator

==== Defeated in primary ====
- Katie Gooch, community organizer and minister

==== Endorsements ====
Lamont Bagby

State legislators

- Jay Jones, former state delegate from the 89th district (2018–21) and candidate for Attorney General in 2021

Organizations

- Giffords PAC

==== Results ====
County and independent city results Bagby: 60–70%; 80–90%

Virginia's 14th Senate District, 2023 Democratic primary
Party	Candidate	Votes	%
Democratic	Lamont Bagby (incumbent)	14,032	71.85%
Democratic	Katie Gooch	5,498	28.15%
Total votes		19,530	100.00%

=== General election ===
Predictions

Source	Ranking	As of
Elections Daily	Safe D	November 6, 2023
CNalysis	Safe D	September 8, 2023

Virginia's 14th Senate District, 2023 general election
Party	Candidate	Votes	%
Democratic	Lamont Bagby (incumbent)	61,127	95.34
Write-in		2,989	4.66%
Total votes		64,116	100.00%
Democratic hold			

== District 15 ==
2023 Virginia Senate 15th District election
- November 7, 2023
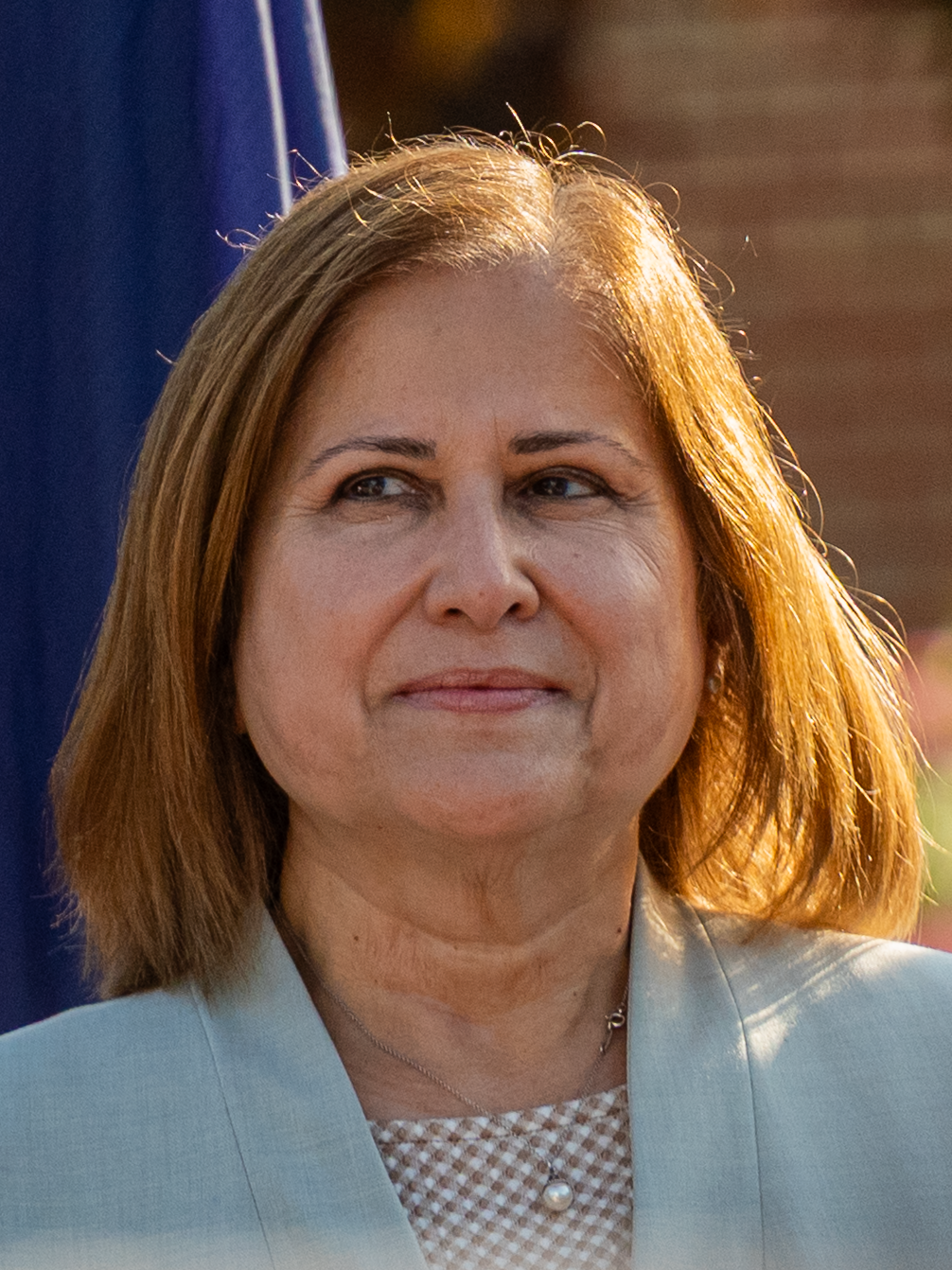

Candidate	Ghazala Hashmi	Hayden Fisher
Party	Democratic	Republican
Popular vote	33,253	20,042
Percentage	62.2%	37.5%
- Precinct results Hashmi: 50–60% 60–70% 70–80% 80–90% Fisher: 50–60%
State senator before election
Ghazala Hashmi
Democratic
Elected State senator
Ghazala Hashmi
Democratic

Senate District 15 contains portions of the city of Richmond and Chesterfield County. The incumbent was Democrat Ghazala Hashmi, who was first elected in 2019.

=== Democratic primary ===
==== Nominee ====
- Ghazala Hashmi, incumbent senator

==== Endorsements ====
Ghazala Hashmi

Organizations

- Giffords PAC

=== Republican primary ===
==== Nominee ====
- Hayden Fisher, attorney

==== Withdrawn ====
- Elmer Diaz, realtor

=== General election ===
Predictions

Source	Ranking	As of
Elections Daily	Safe D	November 6, 2023
CNalysis	Solid D	September 8, 2023

Virginia's 15th Senate District, 2023 general election
Party	Candidate	Votes	%
Democratic	Ghazala Hashmi (incumbent)	33,253	62.16%
Republican	Hayden Fisher	20,042	37.46%
Write-in		202	0.38%
Total votes		53,494	100.00%
Democratic hold			

== District 16 ==
2023 Virginia Senate 16th District election
- November 7, 2023
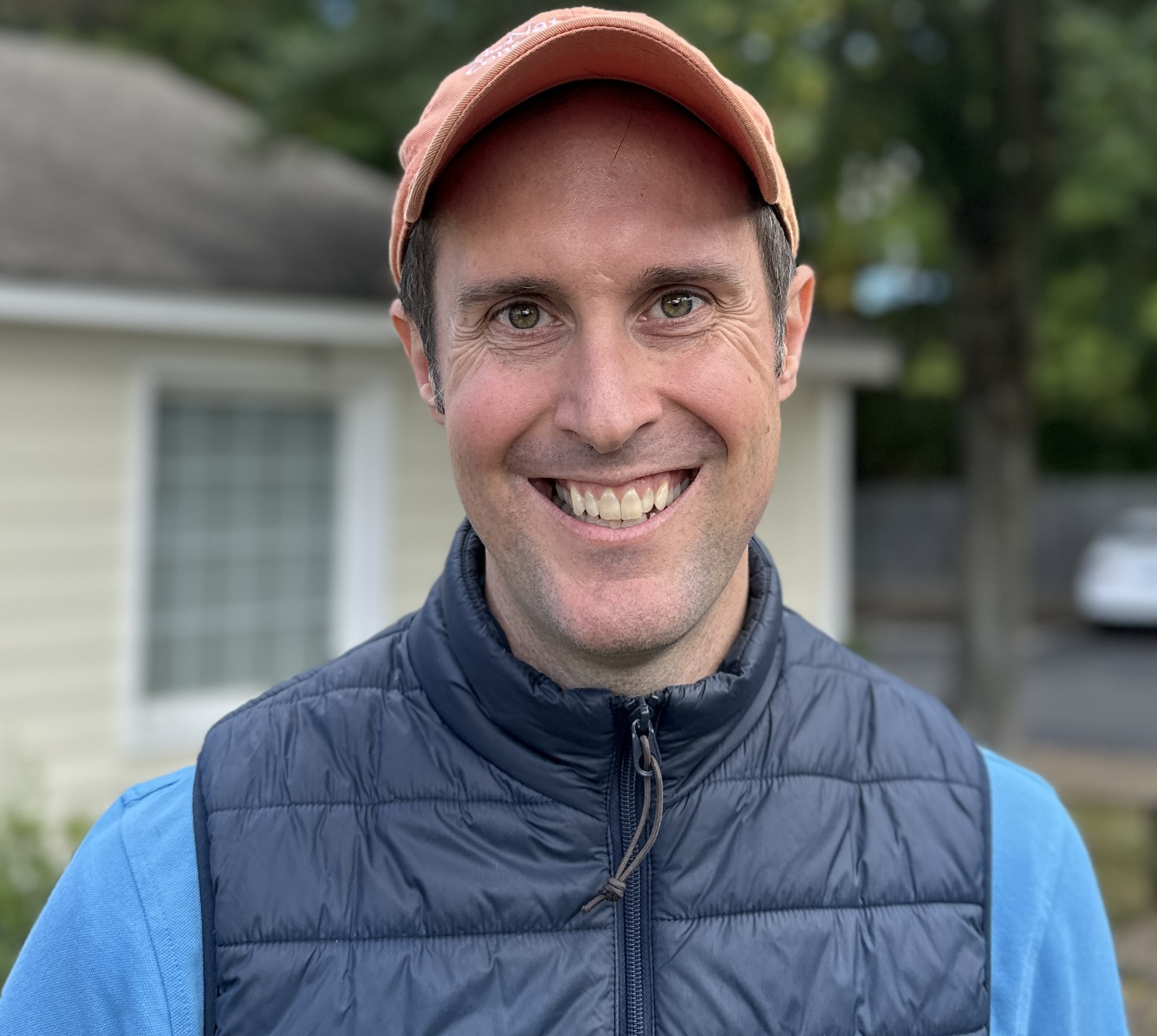

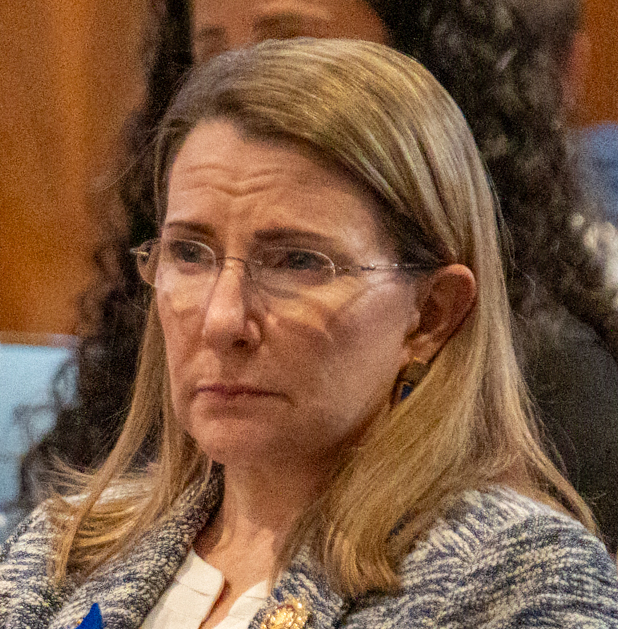
Candidate	Schuyler VanValkenburg	Siobhan Dunnavant
Party	Democratic	Republican
Popular vote	44,803	37,000
Percentage	54.7%	45.1%
- Precinct results VanValkenburg: 50–60% 60–70% 70–80% 80–90% Dunnavant: 50–60% 60–70%
State senator before election
Siobhan Dunnavant
Republican
Elected State senator
Schuyler VanValkenburg
Democratic

Senate District 16 contains portions of Henrico County. The incumbent was Republican Siobhan Dunnavant, who was first elected in 2015.

=== Republican primary ===
==== Nominee ====
- Siobhan Dunnavant, incumbent senator

=== Democratic primary ===
==== Nominee ====
- Schuyler VanValkenburg, state delegate for HD-72 (2018–present)

==== Endorsements ====
Schuyler VanValkenburg

State legislators

- Jay Jones, state delegate for 89th district (2018–2021)

Organizations

- Giffords PAC

=== General election ===
==== Endorsements ====
Schuyler VanValkenburg

Federal officials

- Joe Biden, President of the United States
- Kamala Harris, Vice President of the United States

Predictions

Source	Ranking	As of
Elections Daily	Lean D (flip)	November 6, 2023
CNalysis	Lean D (flip)	September 8, 2023

Virginia's 16th Senate District, 2023 general election
Party	Candidate	Votes	%
Democratic	Schuyler VanValkenburg	44,803	54.66%
Republican	Siobhan Dunnavant (incumbent)	37,000	45.14%
Write-in		157	0.18%
Total votes		81,960	100.00%
Democratic gain from Republican			

== District 17 ==
2023 Virginia Senate 17th District election
- November 7, 2023
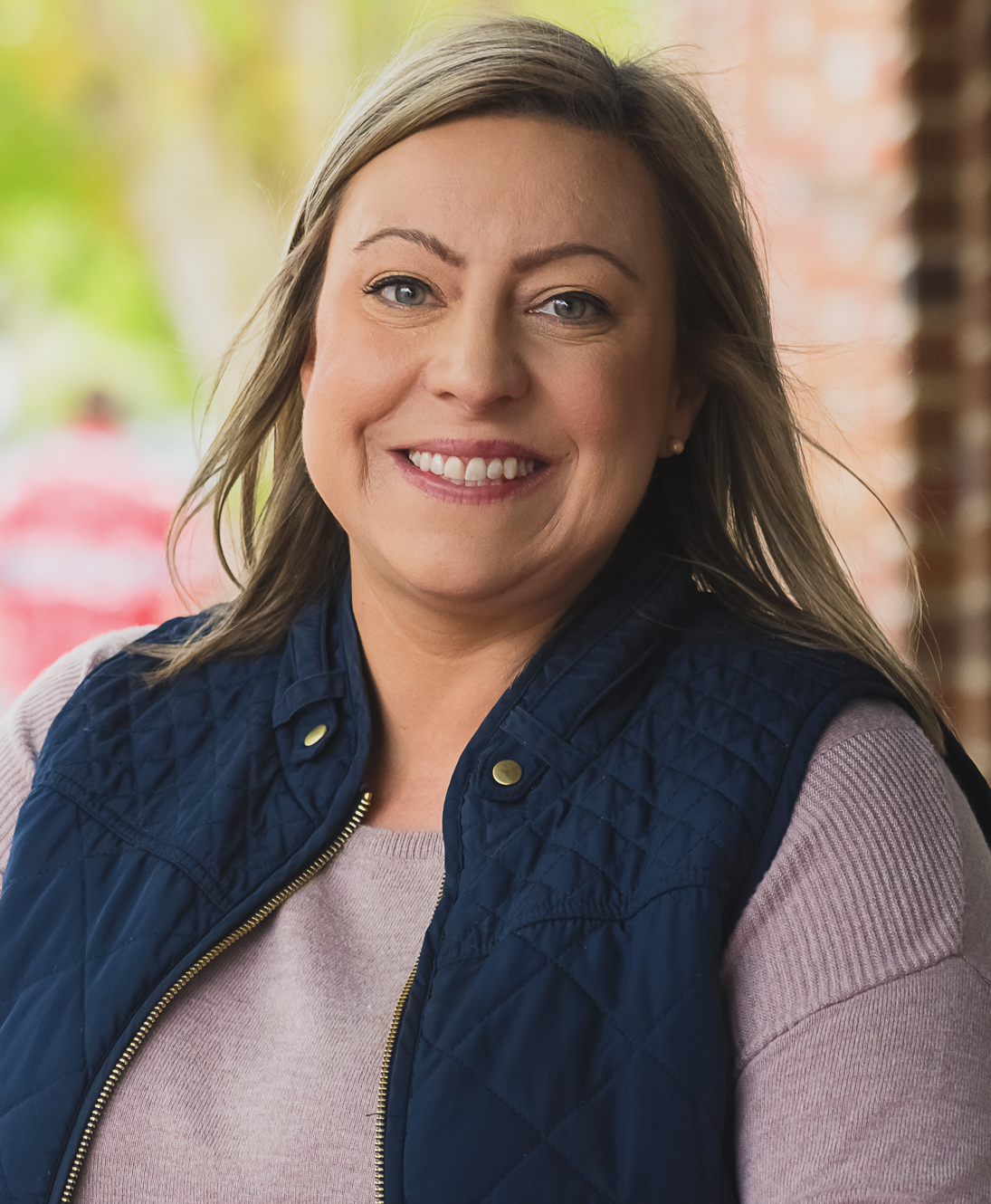

Candidate	Emily Brewer	Clint Jenkins
Party	Republican	Democratic
Popular vote	39,752	36,083
Percentage	52.3%	47.5%
- Precinct results Brewer: 50–60% 60–70% 70–80% 80–90% Jenkins: 50–60% 60–70% 70–80% 80–90% >90% No Data
State senator before election
OPEN
Elected State senator
Emily Brewer
Republican

Senate District 17 contains the entire cities of Emporia, Franklin, Suffolk, Brunswick County, Greensville County, Isle of Wight County, and Southampton County, as well as portions of the city of Portsmouth and Dinwiddie County. This was an open seat following redistricting.

=== Democratic primary ===
==== Nominee ====
- Clint Jenkins, state delegate

==== Endorsements ====
Clint Jenkins

Organizations

- Giffords PAC

=== Republican primary ===
==== Nominee ====
- Emily Brewer, state delegate

==== Defeated in primary ====
- Hermie Sadler, former NASCAR driver, broadcaster, and owner of Sadler Travel Plaza

==== Results ====
Virginia's 17th Senate District, 2023 Republican primary
Party	Candidate	Votes	%
Republican	Emily Brewer	9,552	58.77%
Republican	Hermie Sadler	6,700	41.23%
Total votes		16,252	100.00%

=== General election ===
==== Endorsements ====
Emily Brewer

State officials

- Jason Miyares, 48th attorney general of Virginia (2022–present) and state delegate from the 82nd district (2016–2022)
- Winsome Sears, 42nd lieutenant governor of Virginia (2022–present) and state delegate from the 90th district (2002–2004)
- Glenn Youngkin, 74th governor of Virginia (2022–present)
Clint Jenkins

Federal officials

- Joe Biden, President of the United States
- Kamala Harris, Vice-President of the United States

Predictions

Source	Ranking	As of
Elections Daily	Lean R	November 6, 2023
CNalysis	Lean R	September 8, 2023

Virginia's 17th Senate District, 2023 general election
Party	Candidate	Votes	%
Republican	Emily Brewer	39,752	52.27%
Democratic	Clint Jenkins	36,083	47.45%
Write-in		216	0.28%
Total votes		76,051	100.00%
Republican win (new seat)			

== District 18 ==
2023 Virginia Senate 18th District election
- November 7, 2023
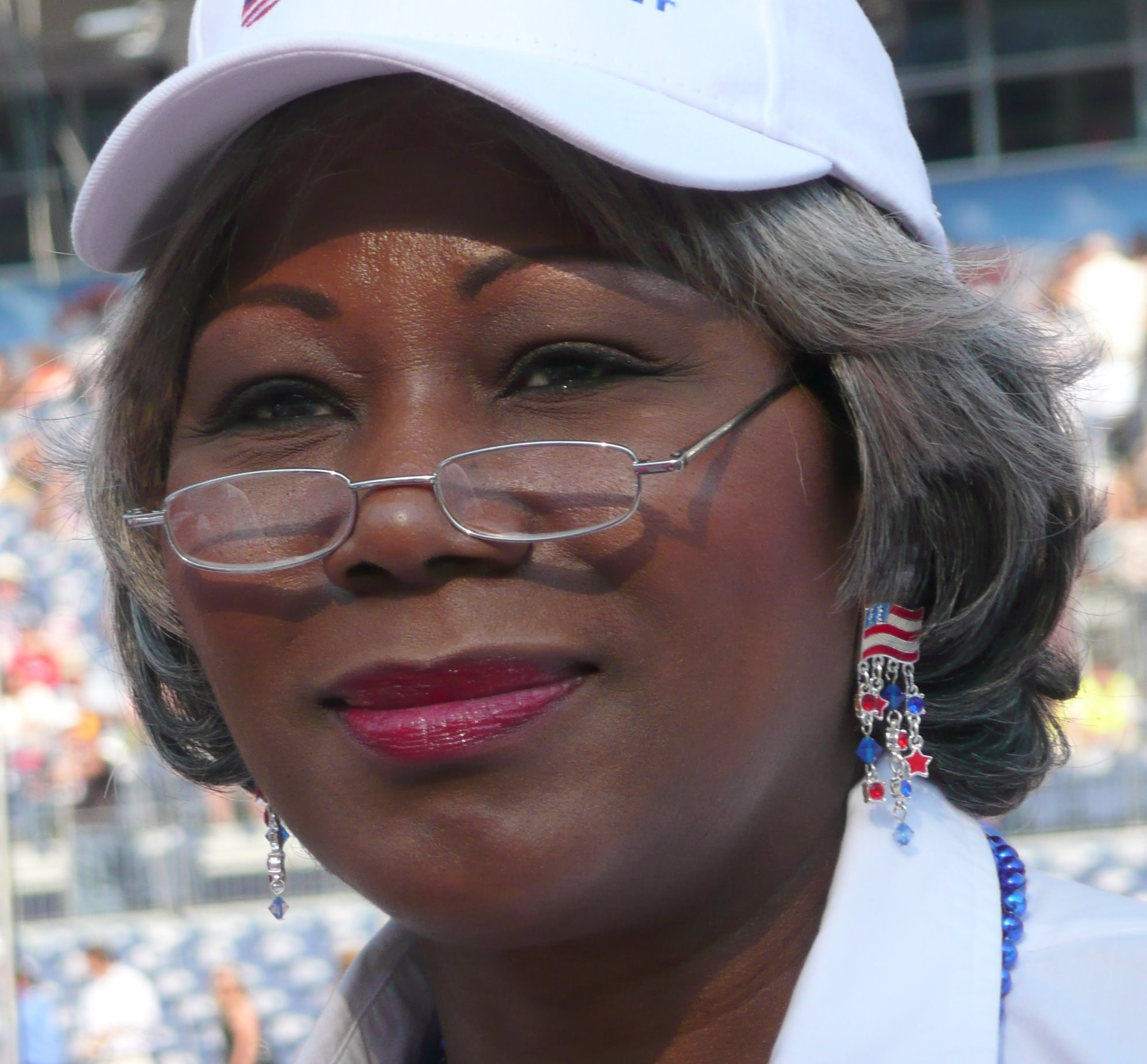

Candidate	Louise Lucas	Tony Goodwin
Party	Democratic	Republican
Popular vote	28,668	19,828
Percentage	58.9%	40.7%
- Precinct results Lucas: 50–60% 60–70% 70–80% 80–90% >90% Goodwin: 40–50% 50–60% 60–70% 70–80%
State senator before election
Louise Lucas
Democratic
Lionell Spruill
Democratic
Elected State senator
Louise Lucas
Democratic

Senate District 18 contains portions of the cities of Chesapeake and Portsmouth. This district had two incumbents following redistricting: Democrat Louise Lucas, who was first elected in 1991, and Democrat Lionell Spruill, who was first elected in 2016.

=== Democratic primary ===
==== Nominee ====
- Louise Lucas, President pro tempore of the Virginia Senate (2020–present) from SD-18 (1992–present)

==== Eliminated in primary ====
- Lionell Spruill, incumbent senator for SD-05 (2016–present)

==== Endorsements ====
Lionell Spruill

State legislators

- Jay Jones, state delegate for 89th district (2018-2021)

==== Results ====
Primary results by precinct: Lucas: 50–60%; 60–70%; 70–80%; 80–90%; Spruill: 50–60%; 60–70%; 70–80%

Virginia's 18th Senate District, 2023 Democratic primary
Party	Candidate	Votes	%
Democratic	Louise Lucas (incumbent)	9,614	53.12%
Democratic	Lionell Spruill (incumbent)	8,484	46.88%
Total votes		18,098	100.00%

=== Republican primary ===
==== Nominee ====
- Tony Goodwin, businessman

==== Eliminated in primary ====
- Merle Rutledge, activist and candidate for governor in 2021

==== Results ====
Virginia's 18th Senate District, 2023 Republican firehouse primary
Party	Candidate	Votes	%
Republican	Tony Goodwin	175	87.94
Republican	Merle Rutledge	24	12.06
Total votes		199	100.00%

=== General election ===
Predictions

Source	Ranking	As of
Elections Daily	Safe D	November 6, 2023
CNalysis	Solid D	September 8, 2023

Virginia's 18th Senate District, 2023 general election
Party	Candidate	Votes	%
Democratic	Louise Lucas (incumbent)	28,668	58.87%
Republican	Tony Goodwin	19,828	40.72%
Write-in		203	0.42%
Total votes		48,699	100.00%
Democratic hold			

== District 19 ==
2023 Virginia Senate 19th District election
- November 7, 2023
Candidate	Christie Craig	Myra Payne
Party	Republican	Democratic
Popular vote	35,186	25,201
Percentage	58.1%	42.6%
- Precinct results Craig: 50–60% 60–70% 70–80% Payne: 50–60% 60–70%
State senator before election
John Cosgrove
Republican
Elected State senator
Christie Craig
Republican

Senate District 19 contains portions of the cities of Chesapeake and Virginia Beach. The incumbent was Republican John Cosgrove, who was first elected in 2013.

=== Republican primary ===
==== Nominee ====
- Christie Craig, former Chesapeake school board member and former chief of staff to incumbent John Cosgrove

==== Defeated in primary ====
- Tim Anderson, state delegate
- Jeff Bruzzesi, businessman

==== Declined ====
- John Cosgrove, incumbent senator

==== Results ====
Virginia's 19th Senate District, 2023 Republican primary
Party	Candidate	Votes	%
Republican	Christie Craig	4,582	37.66%
Republican	Tim Anderson	3,979	32.71%
Republican	Jeff L. Bruzzesi	3,605	29.63%
Total votes		12,166	100.00%

=== Democratic primary ===
==== Nominee ====
- Myra Payne

=== General election ===
Predictions

Source	Ranking	As of
Elections Daily	Safe R	November 6, 2023
CNalysis	Solid R	September 8, 2023

Virginia's 19th Senate District, 2023 general election
Party	Candidate	Votes	%
Republican	Christie Craig	35,186	58.11%
Democratic	Myra Payne	25,201	42.62%
Write-in		160	0.26%
Total votes		60,547	100.00%
Republican hold			

== District 20 ==
2023 Virginia Senate 20th District election
- November 7, 2023
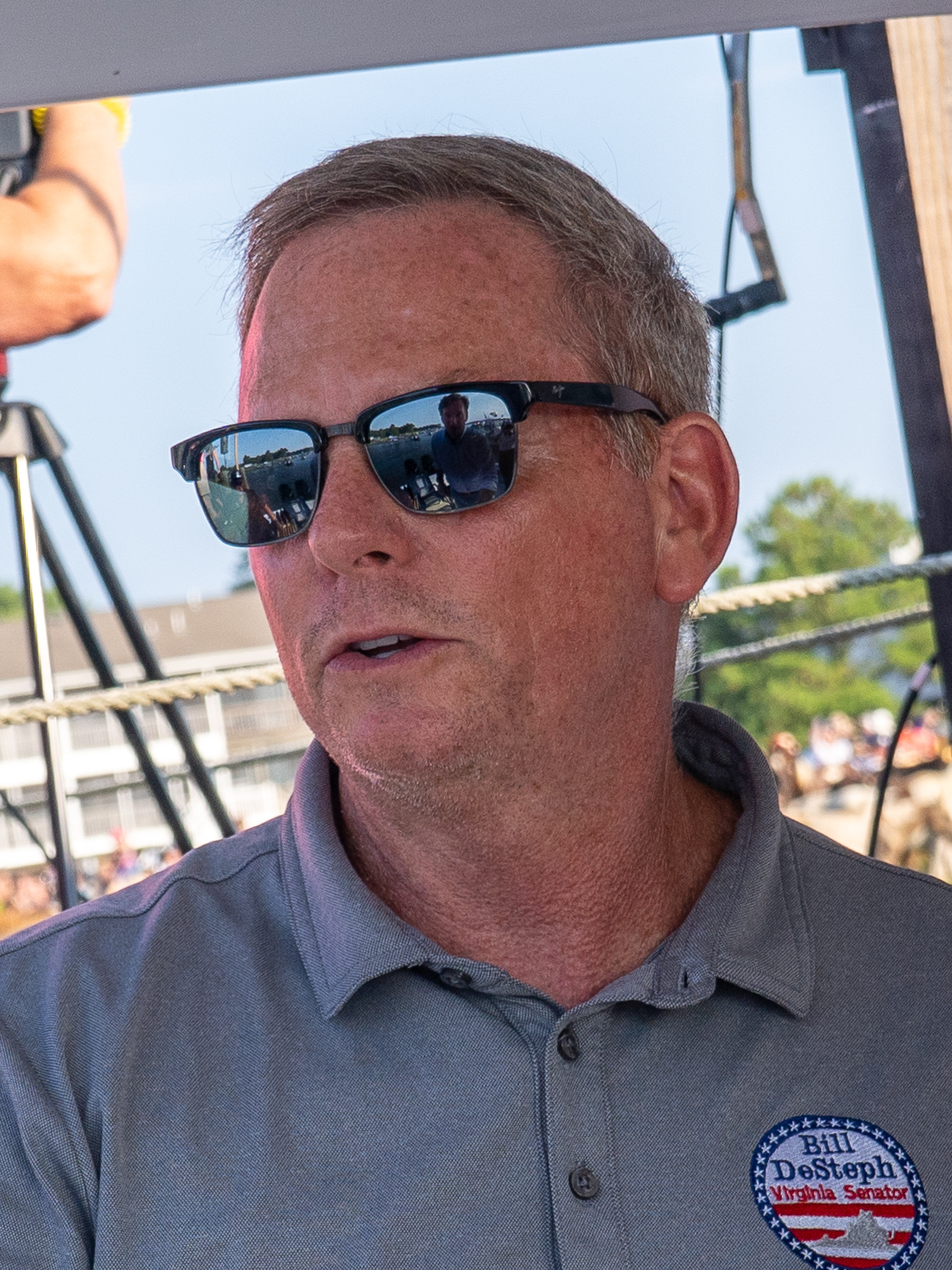

Candidate	Bill DeSteph	Victoria Luevanos
Party	Republican	Democratic
Popular vote	36,545	27,560
Percentage	56.9%	42.9%
- Precinct results DeSteph: 50–60% 60–70% 70–80% 80–90% >90% Luevanos: 50–60% 60–70% 70–80%
State senator before election
Bill DeSteph
Republican
Lynwood Lewis
Democratic
Elected State senator
Christie Craig
Republican

Senate District 20 contains all of Accomack County and Northampton County, as well as portions of the cities of Norfolk and Virginia Beach. This district had two incumbents following redistricting: Democrat Lynwood Lewis, who was first elected in 2014, and Republican Bill DeSteph, who was first elected in 2015.

=== Democratic primary ===
==== Nominee ====
- Victoria Luevanos, U.S. Navy veteran

==== Declined ====
- Lynwood Lewis, incumbent senator

=== Republican primary ===
==== Nominee ====
- Bill DeSteph, incumbent senator

=== General election ===
Predictions

Source	Ranking	As of
Elections Daily	Safe R (flip)	November 6, 2023
CNalysis	Solid R (flip)	September 8, 2023

Virginia's 20th Senate District, 2023 general election
Party	Candidate	Votes	%
Republican	Bill DeSteph (incumbent)	36,545	56.90%
Democratic	Victoria Luevanos	27,560	42.91%
Write-in		126	0.20%
Total votes		64,231	100.00%
Republican hold			

== District 21 ==
2023 Virginia Senate 21st District election
- November 7, 2023
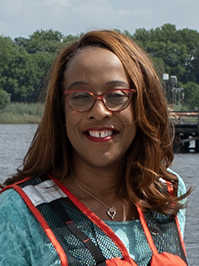

Candidate	Angelia Williams Graves	Giovanni Dolmo
Party	Democratic	Independent
Popular vote	28,071	7,913
Percentage	77.0%	21.7%
- Precinct results Graves: 50–60% 60–70% 70–80% 80–90% >90%
State senator before election
OPEN
Elected State senator
Angelia Williams Graves
Democratic

Senate District 21 contains portions of the city of Norfolk. This was an open seat following redistricting.

=== Democratic primary ===
==== Nominee ====
- Angelia Williams Graves, state delegate for HD-90 (2021–present)

==== Defeated in primary ====
- Andria McClellan, Norfolk city councilor and candidate for Lieutenant Governor in 2021

==== Withdrawn ====
- Mike Pudhorodsky, activist

==== Endorsements ====
Angelia Williams Graves

State officials

- Ralph Northam, 73rd governor of Virginia (2018-2022)

State legislators

- Jay Jones, state delegate for 89th district (2018-2021)
- Don Scott, state delegate from the 80th district (2020-present) and Minority Leader of the Virginia House of Delegates (2022-present)

==== Results ====
Virginia's 21st Senate District, 2023 Democratic primary
Party	Candidate	Votes	%
Democratic	Angelia Williams Graves	7,983	62.23%
Democratic	Andria P. McClellan	4,846	37.77%
Total votes		12,829	100.00%

=== Independents ===
- Giovanni Dolmo, Republican nominee for HD-89 in the 2022 special election

=== General election ===
Predictions

Source	Ranking	As of
Elections Daily	Safe D	November 6, 2023
CNalysis	Solid D	September 8, 2023

Virginia's 21st Senate District, 2023 general election
Party	Candidate	Votes	%
Democratic	Angelia Williams Graves	28,071	77.04%
Independent	Giovanni Dolmo	7,913	21.72%
Write-in		454	1.25%
Total votes		36,438	100.00%
Democratic win (new seat)			

== District 22 ==
2023 Virginia Senate 22nd District election
- November 7, 2023
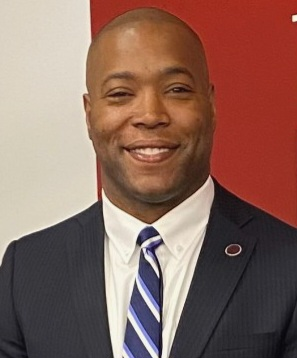

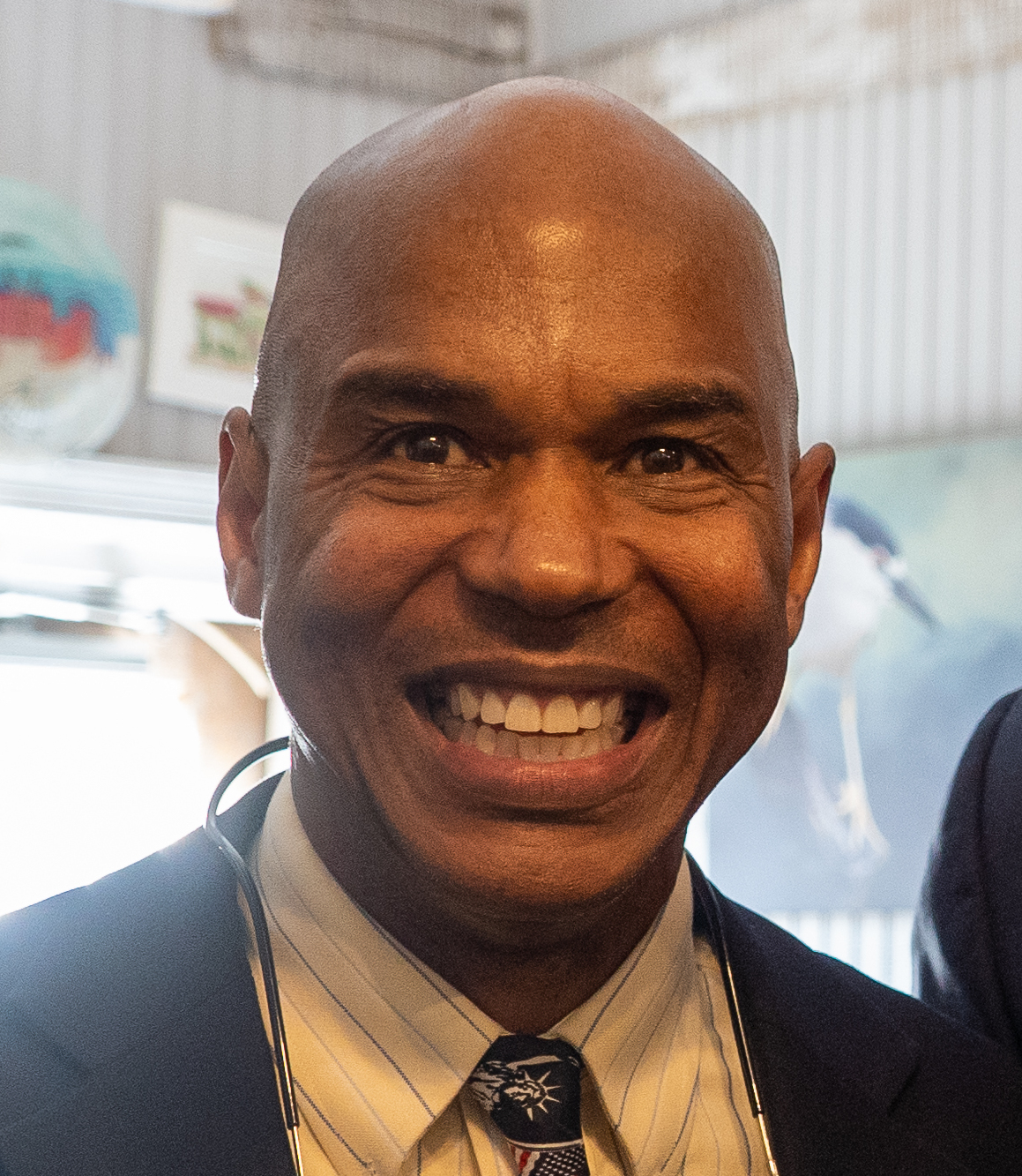
Candidate	Aaron Rouse	Kevin H. Adams
Party	Democratic	Republican
Popular vote	29,999	24,368
Percentage	55.1%	44.8%
- Precinct results Rouse: 50–60% 60–70% 70–80% 80–90% Adams: 50–60% 60–70%
State senator before election
Aaron Rouse
Democratic
Elected State senator
Aaron Rouse
Democratic

Senate District 22 contains portions of Virginia Beach. The incumbent was Democrat Aaron Rouse, who was first elected on January 10, 2023, in a special election triggered by the resignation of the previous incumbent, Jen Kiggans, who resigned this seat after winning her election to Virginia's 2nd congressional district in the 2022 election, defeating incumbent Elaine Luria.

=== Democratic primary ===
==== Nominee ====
- Aaron Rouse, incumbent senator

==== Endorsements ====
Aaron Rouse

Organizations

- Giffords PAC

=== Republican primary ===
==== Nominee ====
- Kevin Adams, U.S. Navy veteran and nominee for SD-7 in the 2023 special election

=== General election ===
Predictions

Source	Ranking	As of
Elections Daily	Safe D	November 6, 2023
CNalysis	Solid D	September 8, 2023

Virginia's 22nd Senate District, 2023 general election
Party	Candidate	Votes	%
Democratic	Aaron Rouse (incumbent)	29,999	55.10%
Republican	Kevin Adams	24,368	44.76%
Write-in		74	0.14%
Total votes		54,441	100.00
Democratic hold			

== District 23 ==
2023 Virginia Senate 23rd District election
- November 7, 2023
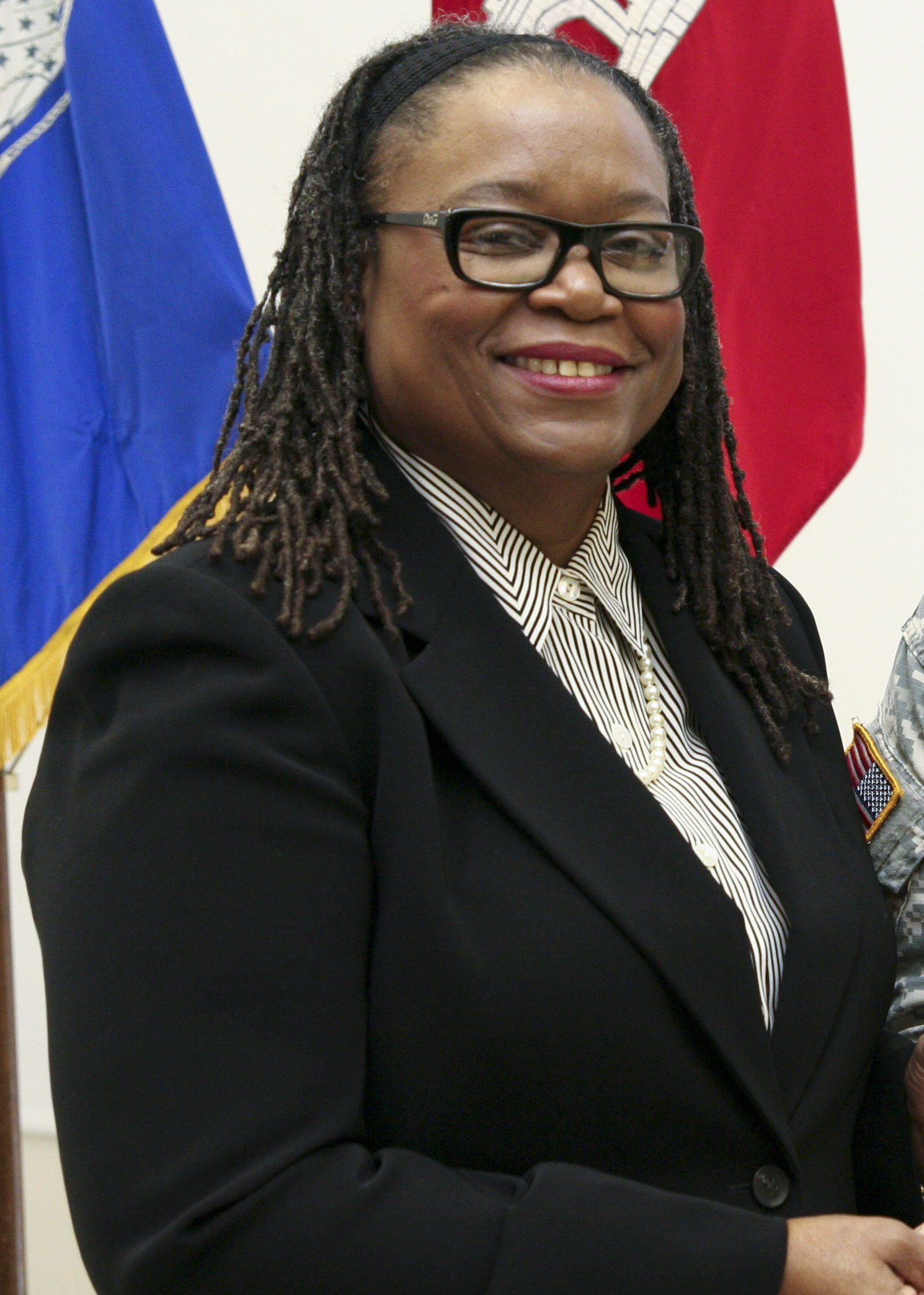
Candidate	Mamie Locke
Party	Democratic
Popular vote	35,132
Percentage	89.7%
- Precinct results Locke: 70–80% 80–90% >90%
State senator before election
Mamie Locke
Democratic
Elected State senator
Mamie Locke
Democratic

Senate District 23 contains the entire city of Hampton, as well as portions of the city of Newport News. The incumbent was Democrat Mamie Locke, who was first elected in 2003.

=== Democratic primary ===
==== Nominee ====
- Mamie Locke, incumbent senator

==== Endorsements ====
Mamie Locke

Organizations

- Giffords PAC

=== General election ===
Predictions

Source	Ranking	As of
Elections Daily	Safe D	November 6, 2023
CNalysis	Safe D	September 8, 2023

Virginia's 23rd Senate District, 2023 general election
Party	Candidate	Votes	%
Democratic	Mamie Locke (incumbent)	35,132	89.73%
Write-in		4,021	10.27%
Total votes		39,153	100.00%
Democratic hold			

== District 24 ==
2023 Virginia Senate 24th District election
- November 7, 2023
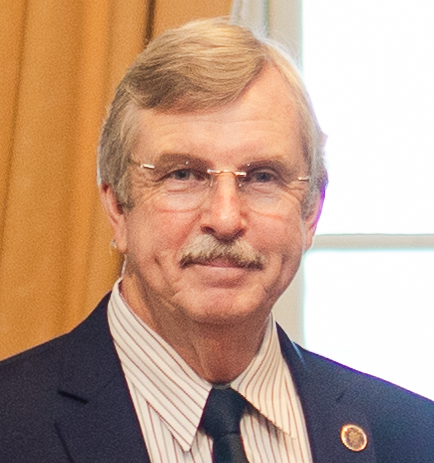

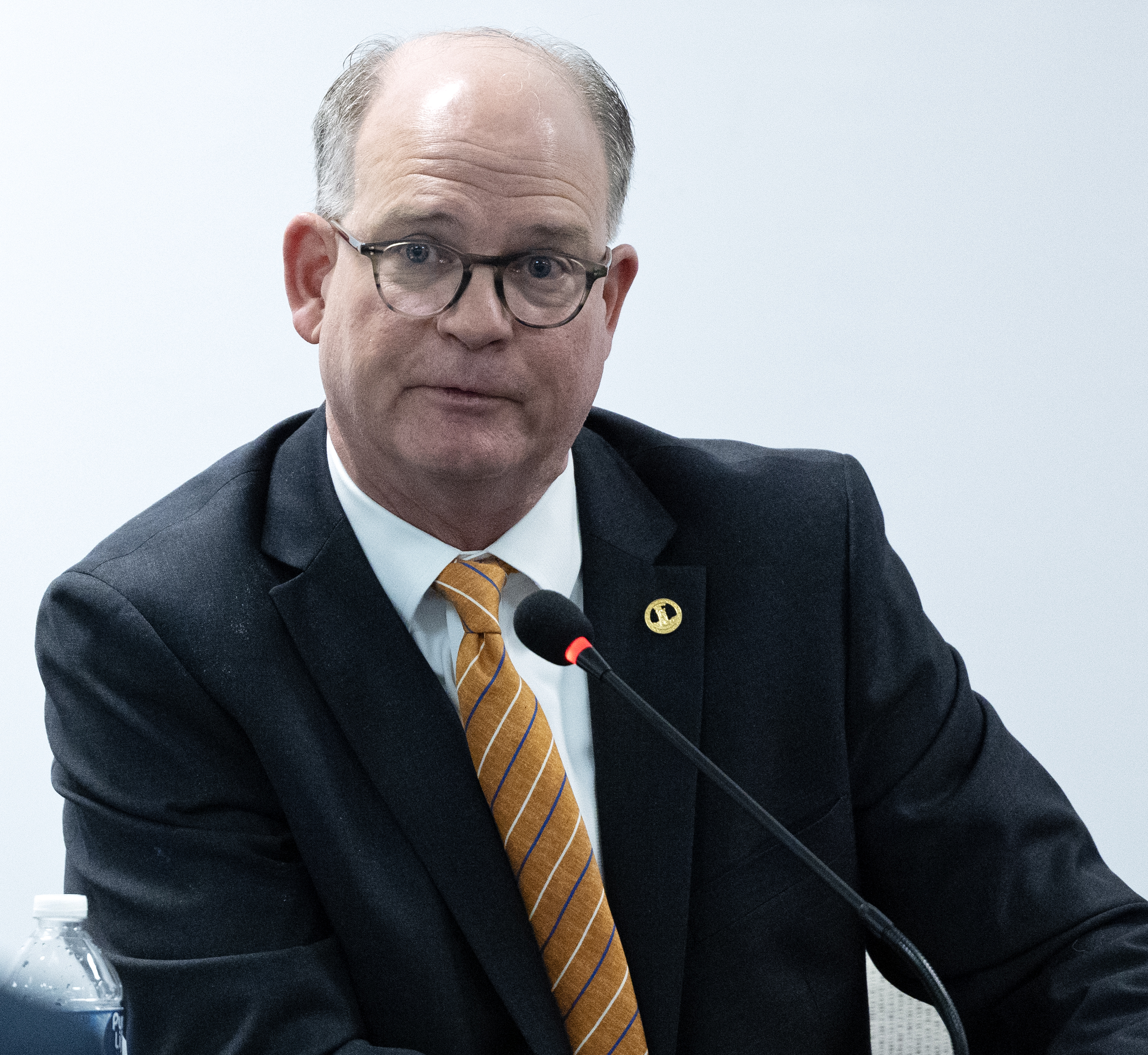
Candidate	Danny Diggs	Monty Mason
Party	Republican	Democratic
Popular vote	33,952	33,227
Percentage	50.4%	49.4%
- Precinct results Diggs: 50–60% 60–70% 70–80% Mason: 50–60% 60–70% 70–80%
State senator before election
Monty Mason
Democratic
Elected State senator
Danny Diggs
Republican

Senate District 24 contains the entire cities of Poquoson, Williamsburg, and York County, as well as portions of the city of Newport News and James City County. The incumbent was Democrat Monty Mason, who was first elected in 2016.

=== Democratic primary ===
==== Nominee ====
- Monty Mason, incumbent senator

==== Endorsements ====
Monty Mason

Organizations

- Giffords PAC

=== Republican primary ===
==== Nominee ====
- Danny Diggs, former York-Poquoson sheriff (2000–22)

=== General election ===
==== Endorsements ====
Monty Mason

Federal officials

- Joe Biden, President of the United States
- Kamala Harris, Vice-President of the United States

Predictions

Source	Ranking	As of
Elections Daily	Lean R (flip)	November 6, 2023
CNalysis	Tossup	September 8, 2023

Virginia's 24th Senate District, 2023 general election
Party	Candidate	Votes	%
Republican	Danny Diggs	33,952	50.43%
Democratic	Monty Mason (incumbent)	33,227	49.36%
Write-in		143	0.21%
Total votes		67,179	100.00%
Republican gain from Democratic			

== District 25 ==
2023 Virginia Senate 25th District election
- November 7, 2023
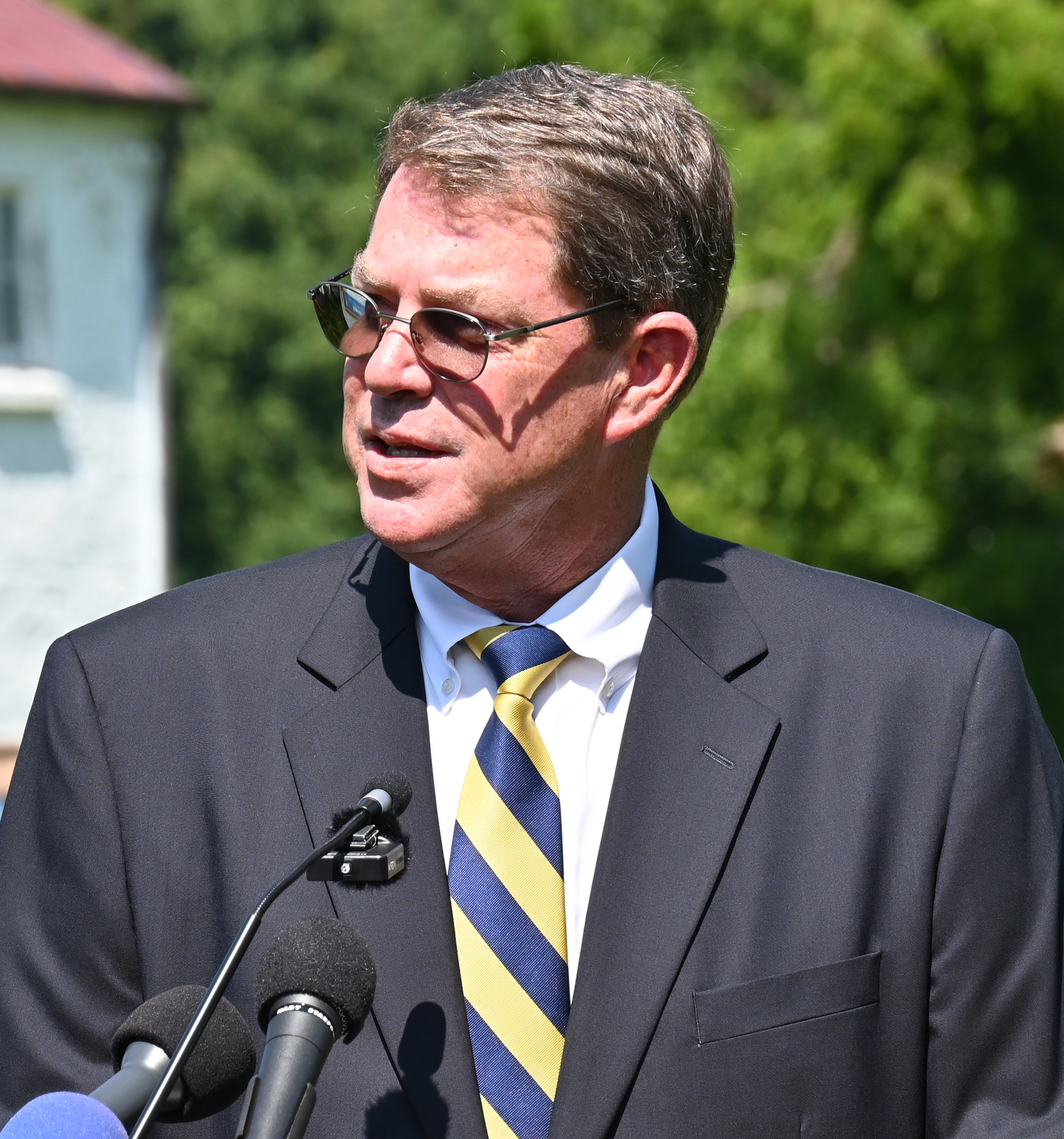

Candidate	Richard Stuart	Jolicia Ward
Party	Republican	Democratic
Popular vote	42,650	26,287
Percentage	61.8%	38.1%
- Precinct results Stuart: 50–60% 60–70% 70–80% 80–90% Ward: 50–60% 60–70%
State senator before election
Richard Stuart
Republican
Elected State senator
Richard Stuart
Republican

Senate District 25 contains all of Caroline County, Essex County, King George County, King William County, Lancaster County, Middlesex County, Northumberland County, Richmond County, and Westmoreland County, as well as portions of King & Queen County and Spotsylvania County. The incumbent was Republican Richard Stuart, who was first elected in 2007.

=== Republican primary ===
==== Nominee ====
- Richard Stuart, incumbent senator

=== Democratic primary ===
==== Nominee ====
- Jolicia Ward, community activist and candidate for HD-99 in 2021

=== General election ===
Predictions

Source	Ranking	As of
Elections Daily	Safe R	November 6, 2023
CNalysis	Solid R	September 8, 2023

Virginia's 25th Senate District, 2023 general election
Party	Candidate	Votes	%
Republican	Richard Stuart (incumbent)	42,650	61.78%
Democratic	Jolicia Ward	26,287	38.08%
Write-in		93	0.13%
Total votes		69,030	100.00%
Republican hold			

== District 26 ==
2023 Virginia Senate 26th District election
- November 7, 2023
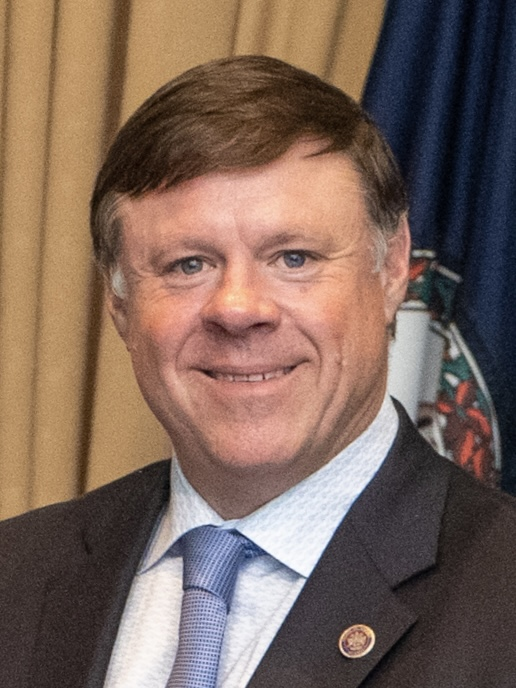
Candidate	Ryan McDougle	Pam Garner
Party	Republican	Democratic
Popular vote	57,026	34,684
Percentage	62.1%	37.8%
- Precinct results McDougle: 50–60% 60–70% 70–80% 80–90% Garner: 50–60% 60–70%
State senator before election
Ryan McDougle
Republican
Tommy Norment
Republican
Elected State senator
Ryan McDougle
Republican

Senate District 26 contains all of Gloucester County, Mathews County, and New Kent County, as well as portions of Hanover County, James City County, and King & Queen County. This district had two incumbents following redistricting: Republican Ryan McDougle, who was first elected in 2006, and Republican Tommy Norment, who was first elected in 1991.

=== Republican primary ===
==== Nominee ====
- Ryan McDougle, incumbent senator

==== Declined ====
- Tommy Norment, Senate Minority Leader

=== Democratic primary ===
==== Nominee ====
- Pam Garner, U.S. Air Force veteran

=== General election ===
Predictions

Source	Ranking	As of
Elections Daily	Safe R	November 6, 2023
CNalysis	Solid R	September 8, 2023

Virginia's 26th Senate District, 2023 general election
Party	Candidate	Votes	%
Republican	Ryan McDougle (incumbent)	57,026	62.13%
Democratic	Pam Garner	34,684	37.79%
Write-in		74	0.08%
Total votes		91,784	100.00%
Republican hold			

== District 27 ==
2023 Virginia Senate 27th District election
- November 7, 2023
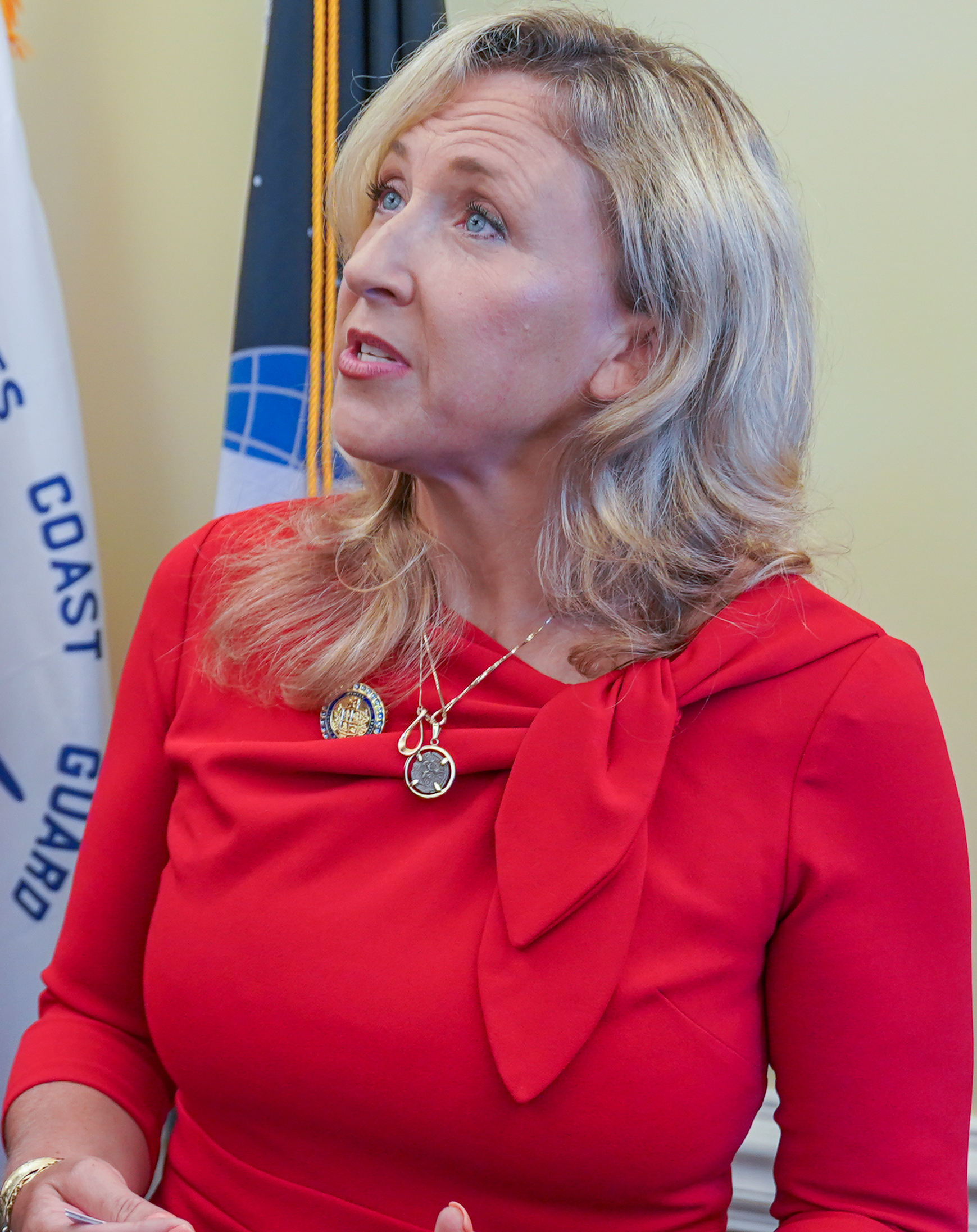

Candidate	Tara Durant	Joel Griffin
Party	Republican	Democratic
Popular vote	34,180	32,927
Percentage	48.1%	46.4%
- Precinct results Durant: 40–50% 50–60% 60–70% Griffin: 40–50% 50–60% 60–70% 70–80%
State senator before election
OPEN
Elected State senator
Tara Durant
Republican

Senate District 27 contains the entire city of Fredericksburg, as well as portions of Spotsylvania County and Stafford County. This was an open seat following redistricting.

=== Democratic primary ===
==== Nominee ====
- Joel Griffin, U.S. Marine veteran

==== Eliminated in primary ====
- Ben Litchfield, attorney

==== Failed to qualify ====
- Luke Wright, U.S. Marine Corps veteran

==== Endorsements ====
Joel Griffin

State legislators

- Jay Jones, state delegate for 89th district (2018-2021)

==== Results ====
County and independent city results Griffin: 50–60%; 60–70%

Virginia's 27th Senate District, 2023 Democratic primary
Party	Candidate	Votes	%
Democratic	Joel Griffin	6,331	59.90%
Democratic	Ben Litchfield	4,239	40.10%
Total votes		10,570	100.00%

=== Republican primary ===
==== Nominee ====
- Tara Durant, state delegate for HD-28 (2022–present)

==== Eliminated in primary ====
- Matt Strickland, U.S. Army veteran

==== Endorsements ====
Tara Durant

State legislators

- Glenn Youngkin, 74th governor of Virginia (2022-present)

==== Results ====
County and independent city results Durant: 50–60%; 70–80%

Virginia's 27th Senate District, 2023 Republican primary
Party	Candidate	Votes	%
Republican	Tara Durant	8,066	56.96%
Republican	Matt Strickland	6,094	43.04%
Total votes		14,160	100.00%

=== Independents ===
==== Declared ====
- Monica Gary, Stafford County supervisor for the Aquia District (2023–present)

=== General election ===
==== Endorsements ====
Joel Griffin

Federal officials

- Joe Biden, President of the United States
- Kamala Harris, Vice-President of the United States

Predictions

Source	Ranking	As of
Elections Daily	Lean R	November 6, 2023
CNalysis	Tilt R	September 8, 2023

Virginia's 27th Senate District, 2023 general election
Party	Candidate	Votes	%
Republican	Tara Durant	34,180	48.11%
Democratic	Joel Griffin	32,927	46.35%
Independent	Monica Gary	3,282	4.62%
Write-in		653	0.92%
Total votes		71,042	100.00%
Republican win (new seat)			

== District 28 ==
2023 Virginia Senate 28th District election
- November 7, 2023
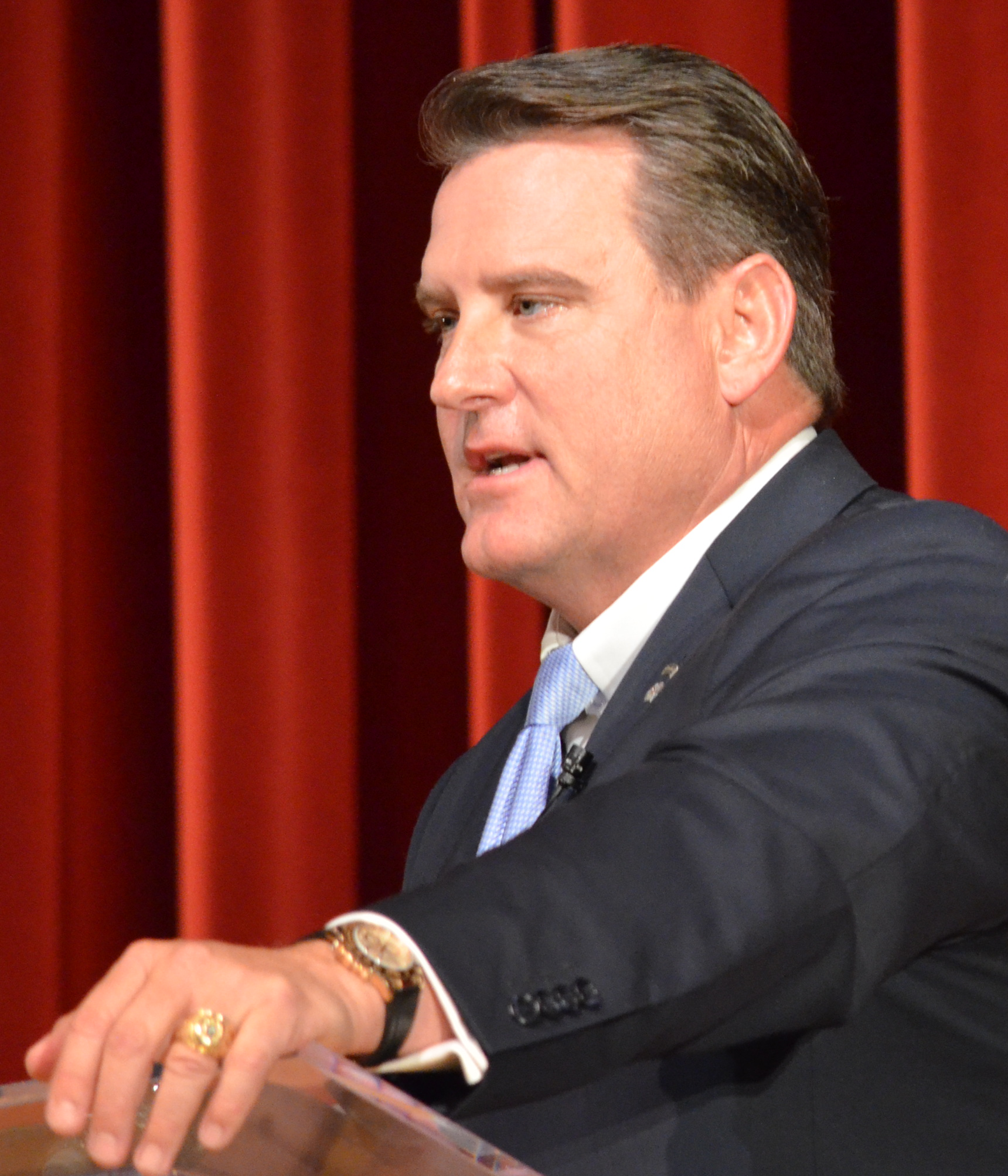

Candidate	Bryce Reeves	Jason Ford
Party	Republican	Democratic
Popular vote	44,737	24,412
Percentage	62.5%	34.1%
- Precinct results Reeves: 40–50% 50–60% 60–70% 70–80% Ford: 40–50% 50–60%
State senator before election
Bryce Reeves
Republican
Elected State senator
Bryce Reeves
Republican

Senate District 28 contains all of Culpeper County, Greene County, Madison County, Orange County, and Rappahannock County, as well as portions of Fauquier County and Spotsylvania County. The incumbent was Bryce Reeves, who was first elected in 2011.

=== Republican firehouse primary ===
==== Nominee ====
- Bryce Reeves, incumbent senator

==== Defeated in primary ====
- Mike Allers, teacher

==== Results ====
Virginia's 28th Senate District, 2023 Republican firehouse primary
Party	Candidate	Votes	%
Republican	Bryce Reeves (incumbent)	2,564	77
Republican	Mike Allers	787	23
Total votes		3,351	100

=== Democratic primary ===
==== Nominee ====
- Jason Ford, manager

=== Independents ===
==== Declared ====
- Elizabeth Melson, president of FairVote Virginia

==== Did not qualify ====
- Tawana Campbell, tax professional

=== General election ===
Predictions

Source	Ranking	As of
Elections Daily	Safe R	November 6, 2023
CNalysis	Solid R	September 8, 2023

Virginia's 28th Senate District, 2023 general election
Party	Candidate	Votes	%
Republican	Bryce Reeves (incumbent)	44,737	62.52%
Democratic	Jason Ford	24,412	34.11%
Independent	Elizabeth Melson	2,305	3.22%
Write-in		105	0.15%
Total votes		71,559	100.00%
Republican hold			

== District 29 ==
2023 Virginia Senate 29th District election
- November 7, 2023
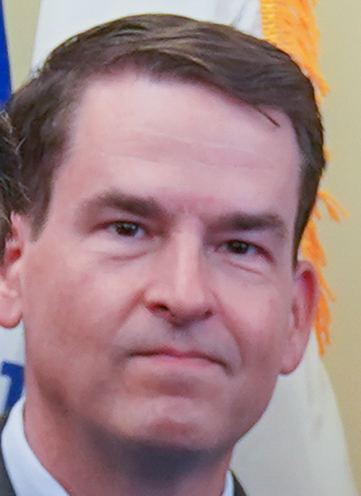
Candidate	Jeremy McPike	Nikki Baldwin
Party	Democratic	Republican
Popular vote	29,641	22,872
Percentage	56.84%	43.4%
- Precinct results McPike: 50–60% 60–70% 70–80% Baldwin: 50–60% 60–70% 70–80%
State senator before election
Jeremy McPike
Democratic
Elected State senator
Jeremy McPike
Democratic

Senate District 29 contains portions of Prince William County and Stafford County. The incumbent was Democrat Jeremy McPike, who was first elected in 2015.

=== Democratic primary ===
==== Nominee ====
- Jeremy McPike, incumbent senator (2016–present)

==== Defeated in primary ====
- Elizabeth Guzmán, state delegate for HD-31 (2018–present)

==== Endorsements ====
Jeremy McPike

State legislators

- Jay Jones, state delegate for 89th district (2018-2021)

Newspapers

- The Washington Post

==== Results ====
County results McPike: 50–60%; Guzmán: 50–60%

Virginia's 29th Senate District, 2023 Democratic primary
Party	Candidate	Votes	%
Democratic	Jeremy McPike (incumbent)	6,321	50.20%
Democratic	Elizabeth Guzmán	6,271	49.80%
Total votes		12,592	100.00%

=== Republican primary ===
==== Nominee ====
- Nikki Baldwin, U.S. Navy veteran

==== Defeated in primary ====
- Maria Martin, author

==== Results ====
Republican Primary results: Baldwin: 50–60%; 60–70%; Martin: 50–60%; 60–70%; 70–80%; Tie

Virginia's 29th Senate District, 2023 Republican primary
Party	Candidate	Votes	%
Republican	Nikki Baldwin	2,605	50.02%
Republican	Maria Martin	2,603	49.98%
Total votes		5,208	100.00%

=== General election ===
Predictions

Source	Ranking	As of
Elections Daily	Safe D	November 6, 2023
CNalysis	Solid D	September 8, 2023

Virginia's 29th Senate District, 2023 general election
Party	Candidate	Votes	%
Democratic	Jeremy McPike (incumbent)	29,641	56.24%
Republican	Nikki Baldwin	22,872	43.40%
Write-in		189	0.36%
Total votes		52,702	100.00%
Democratic hold			

== District 30 ==
2023 Virginia Senate 30th District election
- November 7, 2023
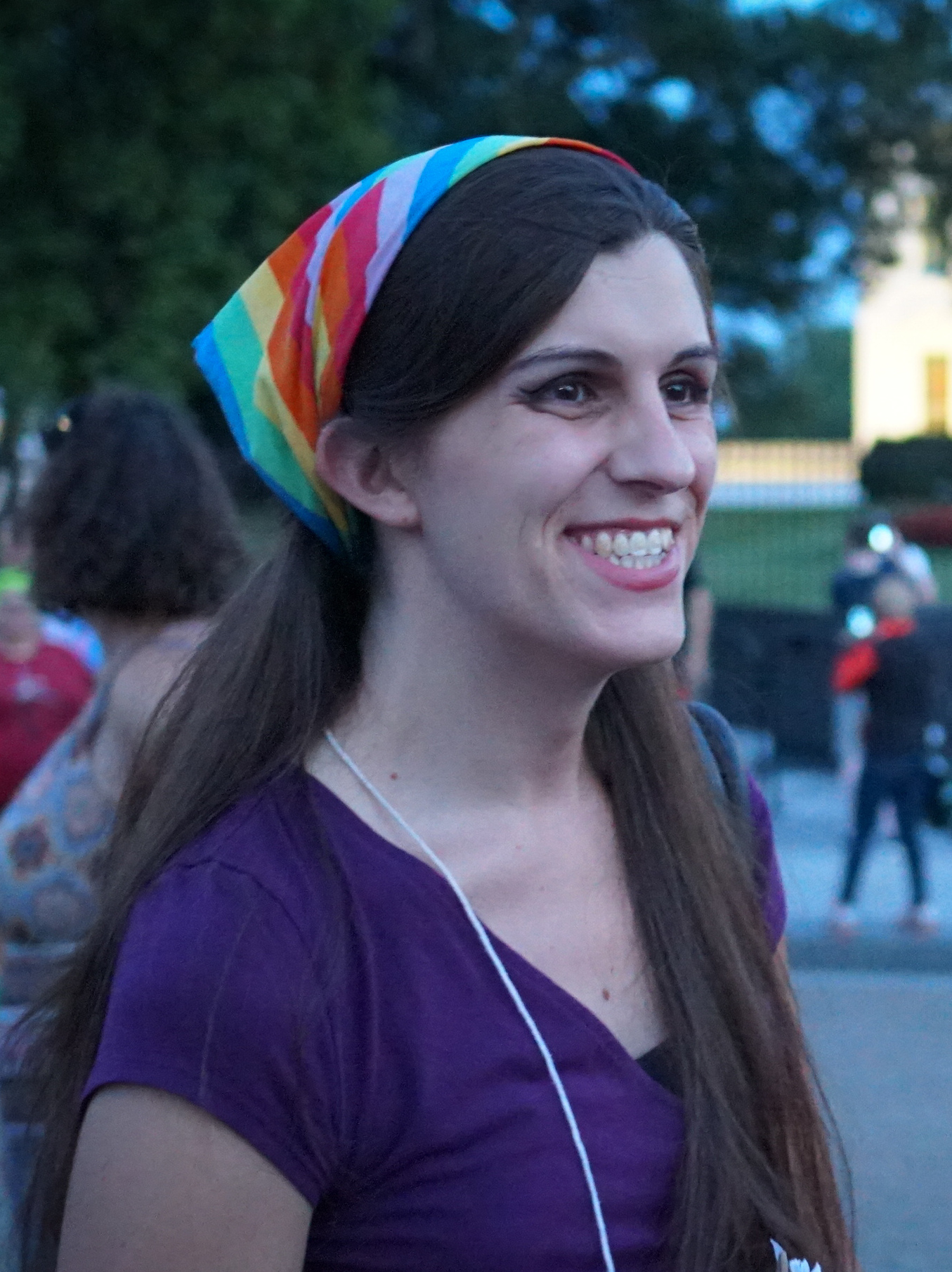

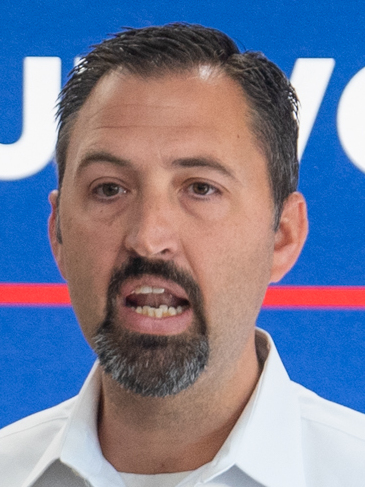
Candidate	Danica Roem	Bill Woolf
Party	Democratic	Republican
Popular vote	30,499	28,240
Percentage	51.8%	47.9%
- Precinct results Roem: 40–50% 50–60% 60–70% Woolf: 40–50% 50–60% 60–70%
State senator before election
OPEN
Elected State senator
Danica Roem
Democratic

Senate District 30 contains all of the cities of Manassas and Manassas Park, as well as portions of Prince William County. This was an open seat following redistricting.

=== Democratic primary ===
==== Nominee ====
- Danica Roem, state delegate for HD-13 (2018–present)

==== Endorsements ====
Danica Roem

Organizations

- Giffords PAC

=== Republican primary ===
==== Nominee ====
- William "Bill" Woolf, nonprofit founder and former Department of Justice employee

==== Defeated in primary ====
- Robert Ruffolo, U.S. Army veteran

==== Withdrawn ====
- Ian Lovejoy, former Manassas City Councilor and nominee for HD-50 in 2019 (running for House of Delegates)

==== Endorsements ====
William "Bill" Woolf

State officials

- Glenn Youngkin, Governor of Virginia (2022-present)

==== Results ====
Virginia's 30th Senate District, 2023 Republican primary
Party	Candidate	Votes	%
Republican	Bill Woolf	4,998	70.22%
Republican	Robert Ruffolo	2,120	29.78%
Total votes		7,118	100.00%

=== General election ===
==== Endorsements ====
Danica Roem

Federal officials

- Joe Biden, President of the United States
- Kamala Harris, Vice-President of the United States

Predictions

Source	Ranking	As of
Elections Daily	Likely D	November 6, 2023
CNalysis	Likely D	September 8, 2023

Virginia's 30th Senate District, 2023 general election
Party	Candidate	Votes	%
Democratic	Danica Roem	30,499	51.76%
Republican	Bill Woolf	28,240	47.93%
Write-in		183	0.31%
Total votes		59,922	100.00%
Democratic win (new seat)			

== District 31 ==
2023 Virginia Senate 31st District election
- November 7, 2023
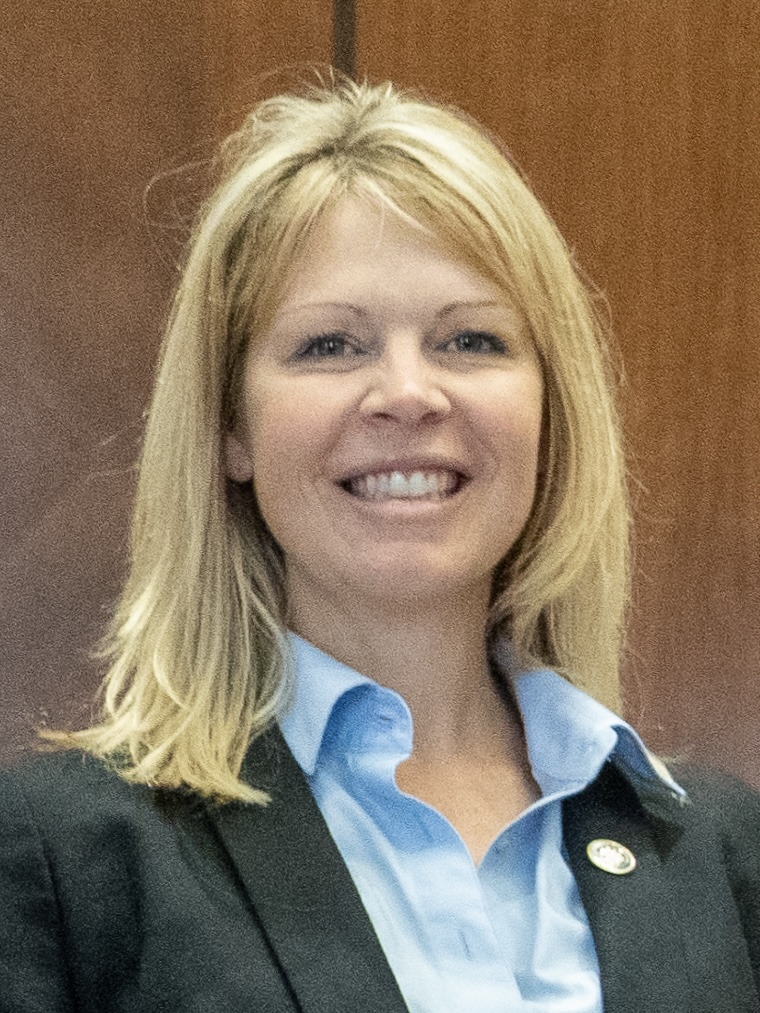

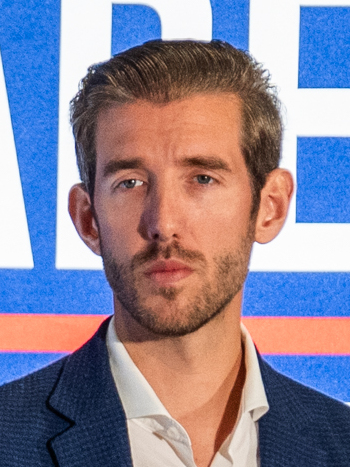
Candidate	Russet Perry	Juan Pablo Segura
Party	Democratic	Republican
Popular vote	46,821	41,755
Percentage	52.7%	47.0%
- Precinct results Perry: 50–60% 60–70% Segura: 40–50% 50–60% 60–70%
State senator before election
Jill Vogel
Republican
Elected State senator
Russet Perry
Democratic

Senate District 31 contains portions of Fauquier County and Loudoun County. The incumbent was Republican Jill Vogel, who was first elected in 2007.

=== Republican primary ===
==== Nominee ====
- Juan Pablo Segura, entrepreneur

==== Withdrawn ====
- Geary Higgins, former Loudoun County supervisor and nominee for SD-13 in 2019

==== Declined ====
- Jill Vogel, incumbent senator

=== Democratic primary ===
==== Nominee ====
- Russet Perry, attorney

==== Defeated in primary ====
- Zach Cummings, Leesburg town councilor (2021–present)

==== Endorsements ====
Russet Perry

State legislators

- Jay Jones, state delegate for 89th district (2018-2021)

Newspapers

- The Washington Post

==== Results ====
Virginia's 31st Senate District, 2023 Democratic primary
Party	Candidate	Votes	%
Democratic	Russet Perry	8,733	65.07%
Democratic	Zach Cummings	4,688	34.93%
Total votes		13,421	100.00%

=== General election ===
Russet Perry

Federal officials

- Joe Biden, President of the United States
- Kamala Harris, Vice-President of the United States

Predictions

Source	Ranking	As of
Elections Daily	Lean D (flip)	November 6, 2023
CNalysis	Lean D (flip)	September 8, 2023

Virginia's 31st Senate District, 2023 general election
Party	Candidate	Votes	%
Democratic	Russet Perry	46,821	52.74%
Republican	Juan Pablo Segura	41,755	47.04%
Write-in		196	0.22%
Total votes		88,772	100.00%
Democratic gain from Republican			

== District 32 ==
2023 Virginia Senate 32nd District election
- November 7, 2023
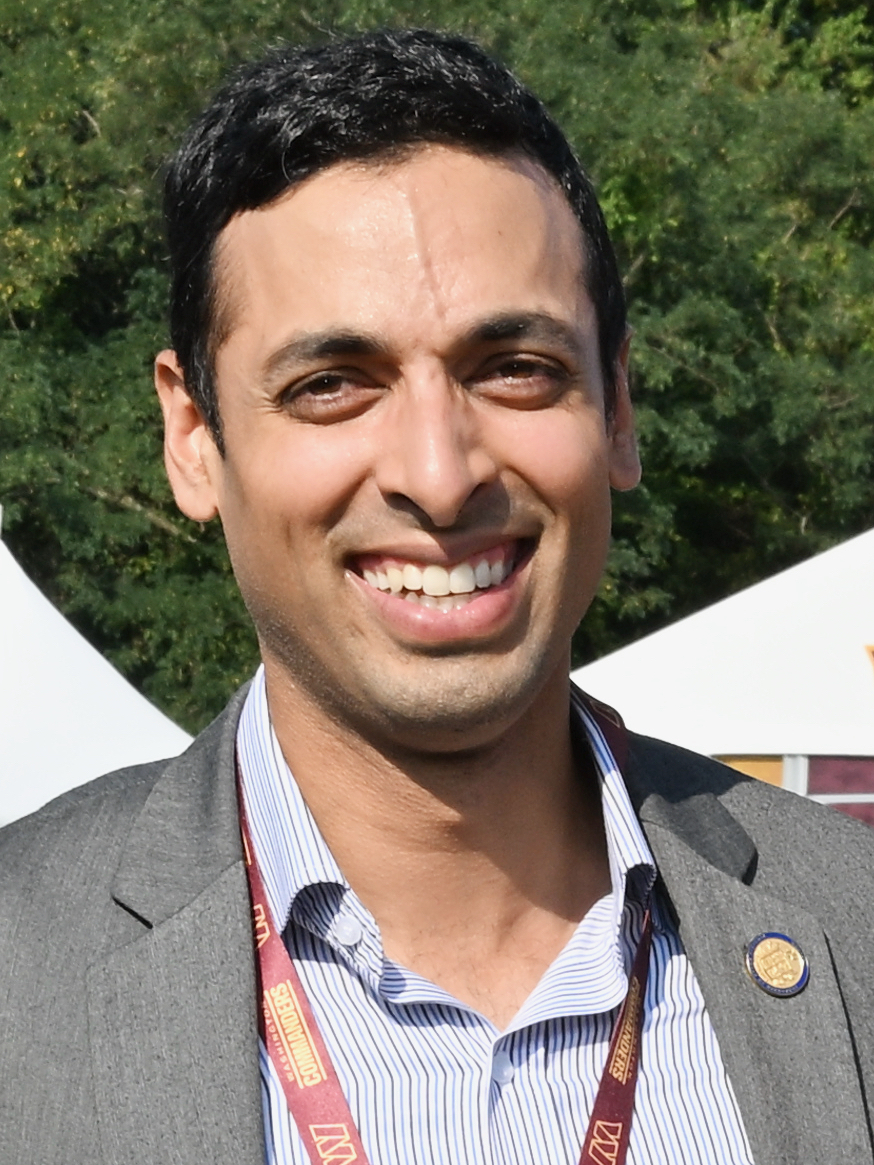

Candidate	Suhas Subramanyam	Greg Moulthrop
Party	Democratic	Republican
Popular vote	36,590	23,541
Percentage	60.6%	39.0%
- Precinct results Subramanyam: 50–60% 60–70% 70–80%
State senator before election
John Bell
Democratic
Elected State senator
Suhas Subramanyam
Democratic

Senate District 32 contains portions of Loudoun County. The incumbent was Democrat John Bell, who was first elected in 2019.

=== Democratic primary ===
==== Nominee ====
- Suhas Subramanyam, state delegate for HD-87 (2020–present)

==== Defeated in primary ====
- Ibraheem Samirah, former state delegate for HD-86 (2019–22)

==== Declined ====
- John Bell, incumbent senator

==== Endorsements ====
Suhas Subramanyam

State legislators

- Jay Jones, state delegate for 89th district (2018-2021)

Newspapers

- The Washington Post

==== Results ====
Virginia's 32nd Senate District, 2023 Democratic primary
Party	Candidate	Votes	%
Democratic	Suhas Subramanyam	11,178	73.65%
Democratic	Ibraheem Samirah	4,000	26.35%
Total votes		15,178	100.00%

=== Republican primary ===
==== Declared ====
- Greg Moulthrop, tech entrepreneur and nominee for HD-87 in 2021

=== General election ===
Predictions

Source	Ranking	As of
Elections Daily	Safe D	November 6, 2023
CNalysis	Solid D	September 8, 2023

Virginia's 32nd Senate District, 2023 general election
Party	Candidate	Votes	%
Democratic	Suhas Subramanyam	36,590	60.55%
Republican	Greg Moulthrop	23,541	38.96%
Write-in		300	0.50%
Total votes		60,431	100.00%
Democratic hold			

== District 33 ==
2023 Virginia Senate 33rd District election
- November 7, 2023
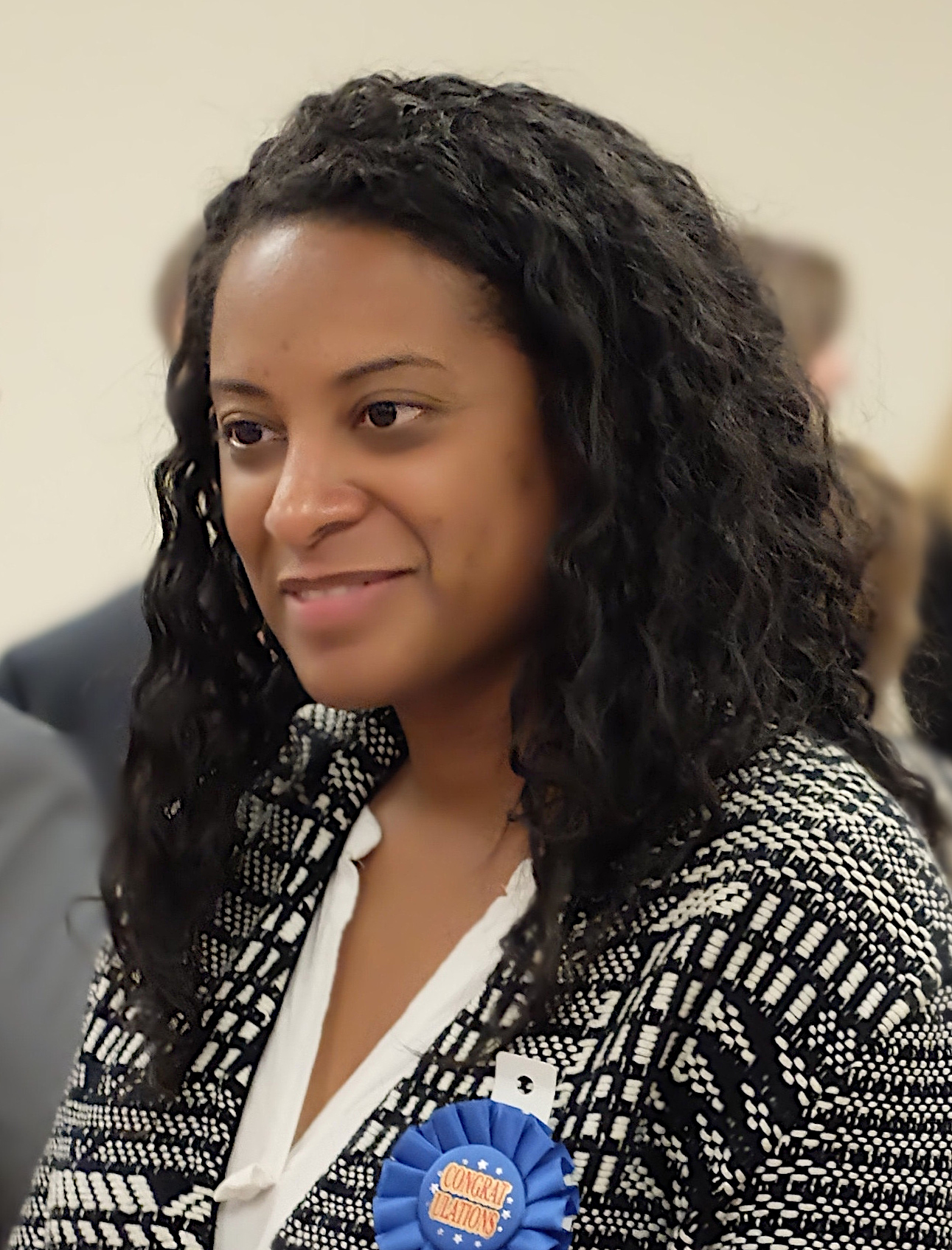

Candidate	Jennifer Carroll Foy	Michael Van Meter
Party	Democratic	Republican
Popular vote	35,003	20,525
Percentage	62.9%	36.9%
- Precinct results Foy: 50–60% 60–70% 70–80% 80–90% Van Meter: 40–50% 50–60% Tie 40–50% No Votes
State senator before election
OPEN
Elected State senator
Jennifer Carroll Foy
Democratic

Senate District 33 contains portions of Fairfax County and Prince William County. This was an open seat following redistricting.

=== Democratic primary ===
==== Nominee ====
- Jennifer Carroll Foy, former state delegate for HD-02 (2018–20) and candidate for governor in 2021

==== Defeated in primary ====
- Hala Ayala, former state delegate for HD-51 (2018–22) and nominee for Lieutenant Governor in 2021

==== Endorsements ====
Hala Ayala

Federal officials

- Jim Moran, U.S. representative from VA-08 (1991–2015)

State officials

- Terry McAuliffe, former governor of Virginia (2014–2018) and former chair of the Democratic National Committee (2001–2005)
- Ralph Northam, former governor of Virginia (2018–2022)

State legislators

- Eileen Filler-Corn, state delegate from HD-41 (2010–present) and former Speaker of the Virginia House of Delegates (2020–2022)
- Dick Saslaw, Majority Leader of the Virginia Senate (2008–2012, 2014, 2020–present) from SD-35 (1980–present)

Organizations

- 314 Action
- Latino Victory
Jennifer Carroll Foy

State legislators

- Nadarius Clark, state delegate from HD-79 (2022–2023)
- Joshua Cole, state delegate from HD–28 (2020–2022)
- Kelly Convirs-Fowler, state delegate from HD–21 (2018–present)
- Dan Helmer, state delegate from HD-40 (2020–present)
- Sally Hudson, state delegate from HD-57 (2020–present)
- Chris Hurst, state delegate from HD-12 (2018–2022)
- Michelle Maldonado, state delegate from HD-50 (2022–present)
- Joe Morrissey, state senator from 16th district (2020–present)
- Don Scott, Minority Leader of the Virginia House of Delegates (2022–present) from HD-80 (2020–present)
- Rodney Willett, state delegate from HD-73 (2020–present)

Individuals

- Qasim Rashid, author and attorney

Labor unions

- IBB
- IBEW
- SMART

Newspapers

- The Washington Post

==== Results ====
County results Carroll Foy: 60–70%

Virginia's 33rd Senate District, 2023 Democratic primary
Party	Candidate	Votes	%
Democratic	Jennifer Carroll Foy	9,627	62.85%
Democratic	Hala Ayala	5,691	37.15%
Total votes		15,318	100.00%

=== Republican primary ===
==== Nominee ====
- Michael Van Meter, U.S. Navy veteran

=== General election ===
Predictions

Source	Ranking	As of
Elections Daily	Safe D	November 6, 2023
CNalysis	Solid D	September 8, 2023

Virginia's 33rd Senate District, 2023 general election
Party	Candidate	Votes	%
Democratic	Jennifer Carroll Foy	35,003	62.85%
Republican	Michael Van Meter	20,525	36.85%
Write-in		169	0.30%
Total votes		55,697	100.00%
Democratic win (new seat)			

== District 34 ==
2023 Virginia Senate 34th District election
- November 7, 2023
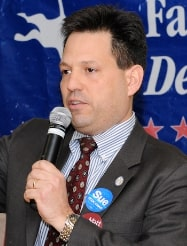

Candidate	Scott Surovell	Mark Springman
Party	Democratic	Republican
Popular vote	38,140	16,389
Percentage	69.8%	30.0%
- Precinct results Surovell: 50–60% 60–70% 70–80% 80–90% Springman: 50–60% No Votes
State senator before election
Scott Surovell
Democratic
Elected State senator
Scott Surovell
Democratic

Senate District 34 contains portions of Fairfax County. The incumbent was Democrat Scott Surovell, who was first elected in 2015.

=== Democratic primary ===
==== Nominee ====
- Scott Surovell, incumbent senator

=== Republican primary ===
==== Nominee ====
- Mark Springman, research analyst

==== Endorsements ====
Scott Surovell

Organizations

- Giffords PAC

=== General election ===
Predictions

Source	Ranking	As of
Elections Daily	Safe D	November 6, 2023
CNalysis	Solid D	September 8, 2023

Virginia's 34th Senate District, 2023 general election
Party	Candidate	Votes	%
Democratic	Scott Surovell (incumbent)	38,140	69.75%
Republican	Mark Springman	16,389	29.97%
Write-in		149	0.27%
Total votes		54,678	100.00%
Democratic hold			

== District 35 ==
2023 Virginia Senate 35th District election
- November 7, 2023
Candidate	Dave Marsden	Mark Vafiades
Party	Democratic	Republican
Popular vote	39,441	18,677
Percentage	67.6%	32.0%
- Precinct results Marsden: 50–60% 60–70% 70–80% 80–90%
State senator before election
Dave Marsden
Democratic
Dick Saslaw
Democratic
Elected State senator
Dave Marsden
Democratic

Senate District 35 contains portions of Fairfax County. This district had two incumbents following redistricting: Democrat Dave Marsden, who was first elected in 2010, and Democrat Dick Saslaw, who was first elected in 1980.

=== Democratic primary ===
==== Nominee ====
- Dave Marsden, incumbent senator

==== Defeated in primary ====
- Heidi Drauschak, public advocate

==== Declined ====
- Dick Saslaw, incumbent senator

==== Endorsements ====
Dave Marsden

Federal officials

- Gerry Connolly, U.S. representative from VA-11 (2009–2025)
- Tim Kaine, U.S Senator from Virginia (2013–present), former chair of the Democratic National Committee (2009–2011), and former governor of Virginia (2006–2010)
- Mark Warner, U.S. senator from Virginia (2009–present) and former governor of Virginia (2002–2006)

State legislators

- Dick Saslaw, Majority Leader of the Virginia Senate (2008–2012, 2014, 2020–present) from SD-35 (1980–present)
- Scott Surovell, state senator from SD-36 (2016–present)

Newspapers

- The Washington Post

==== Results ====
Virginia's 35th Senate District, 2023 Democratic primary
Party	Candidate	Votes	%
Democratic	Dave Marsden (incumbent)	12,179	62.65%
Democratic	Heidi Drauschak	7,260	37.35%
Total votes		19,439	100.00%

=== Republican primary ===
==== Nominee ====
- Mark Vafiades, contractor for U.S. Customs and Border Protection

=== General election ===
Predictions

Source	Ranking	As of
Elections Daily	Safe D	November 6, 2023
CNalysis	Solid D	September 8, 2023

Virginia's 35th Senate District, 2023 general election
Party	Candidate	Votes	%
Democratic	Dave Marsden (incumbent)	39,441	67.63%
Republican	Mark Vafiades	18,677	32.02%
Write-in		198	0.34%
Total votes		58,316	100.00%
Democratic hold			

== District 36 ==
2023 Virginia Senate 36th District election
- November 7, 2023
Candidate	Stella Pekarsky	Julie Perry
Party	Democratic	Republican
Popular vote	36,802	23,458
Percentage	60.8%	38.8%
- Precinct results Pekarsky: 50–60% 60–70% 70–80% Perry: 50–60%
State senator before election
George Barker
Democratic
Elected State senator
Stella Pekarsky
Democratic

Senate District 36 contains portions of Fairfax County. The incumbent was Democrat George Barker, who was first elected in 2007.

=== Democratic primary ===
==== Nominee ====
- Stella Pekarsky, Fairfax County Public Schools board member

==== Defeated in primary ====
- George Barker, incumbent senator

==== Endorsements ====
George Barker

Federal officials

- Gabby Giffords, U.S. representative from AZ-08 (2007–2012)

State officials

- Terry McAuliffe, former governor of Virginia (2014–2018) and former chair of the Democratic National Committee (2001–2005)
- Ralph Northam, former governor of Virginia (2018–2022)

Organizations

- Giffords PAC

Newspapers

- The Washington Post
Stella Pekarsky

State cabinet officials

- Atif Qarni, former Virginia Secretary of Education (2018–2021)

State legislators

- Kaye Kory, state delegate for HD-38 (2010–present)

==== Results ====
Primary results: Pekarsky: 50–60%; 60–70%; 80–90%; Barker: 50–60%; 60–70%; 70–80%; >90%

Virginia's 36th Senate District, 2023 Democratic primary
Party	Candidate	Votes	%
Democratic	Stella Pekarsky	8,083	52.47%
Democratic	George Barker (incumbent)	7,322	47.53%
Total votes		15,405	100.00%

=== Republican primary ===
==== Nominee ====
- Julie Perry, teacher and nominee for HD-86 in 2021

=== General election ===
==== Campaign ====
Perry faced allegations of antisemitism for claiming that "To come out and say you're a teacher on the right is almost as dangerous as ... going through Germany in the 1930s and saying, ‘I'm Jewish.’ It's gotten that bad”.

Predictions

Source	Ranking	As of
Elections Daily	Safe D	November 6, 2023
CNalysis	Solid D	September 8, 2023

Virginia's 36th Senate District, 2023 general election
Party	Candidate	Votes	%
Democratic	Stella Pekarsky	36,802	60.85%
Republican	Julie Perry	23,458	38.78%
Write-in		223	0.37%
Total votes		60,483	100.00%
Democratic hold			

== District 37 ==
2023 Virginia Senate 37th District election
- November 7, 2023
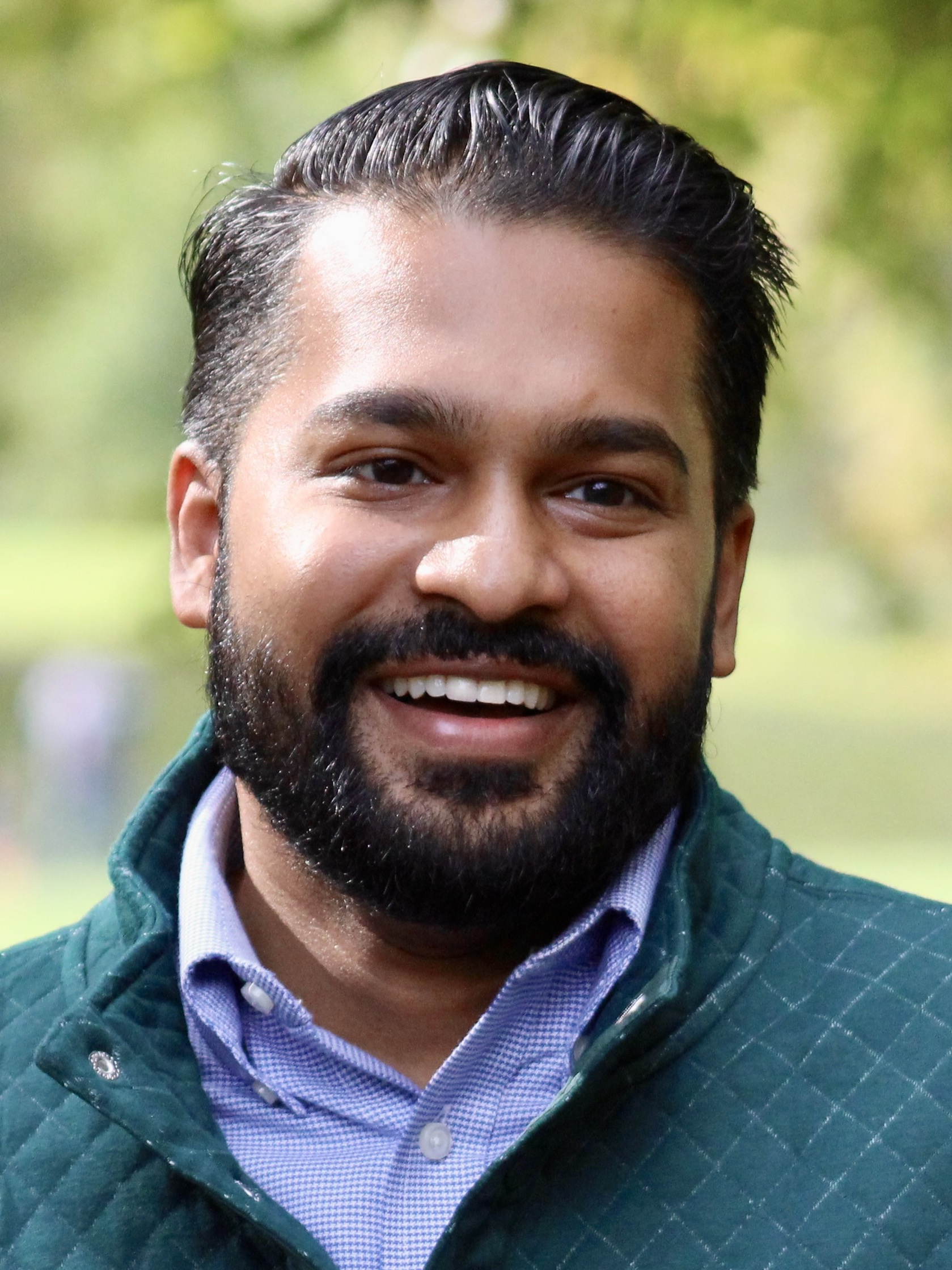

Candidate	Saddam Azlan Salim	Ken Reid
Party	Democratic	Republican
Popular vote	40,947	18,427
Percentage	68.7%	30.9%
- Precinct results Pekarsky: 50–60% 60–70% 70–80% 80–90%
State senator before election
Chap Petersen
Democratic
Elected State senator
Saddam Azlan Salim
Democratic

Senate District 37 contains the entire cities of Falls Church and Fairfax, as well as portions of Fairfax County. The incumbent was Democrat Chap Petersen, who was first elected in 2007.

=== Democratic primary ===
==== Nominee ====
- Saddam Azlan Salim, financial consultant

==== Defeated in primary ====
- Chap Petersen, incumbent senator

==== Withdrawn ====
- Erika Yalowitz, community organizer (endorsed Salim)

==== Endorsements ====
Chap Petersen

Newspapers

- The Washington Post
Saddam Azlan Salim

State legislators

- Eileen Filler-Corn, state delegate from HD-41 (2010–present) and former Speaker of the Virginia House of Delegates (2020–2022)

==== Results ====
County and independent city results Salim: 50–60%; 60–70%; Petersen: 50–60%

Virginia's 37th Senate District, 2023 Democratic primary
Party	Candidate	Votes	%
Democratic	Saddam Azlan Salim	10,477	54.13%
Democratic	Chap Petersen (incumbent)	8,880	45.87%
Total votes		19,357	100.00%

=== Republican primary ===
==== Nominee ====
- Ken Reid, former Loudoun County supervisor

=== General election ===
Predictions

Source	Ranking	As of
Elections Daily	Safe D	November 6, 2023
CNalysis	Solid D	September 8, 2023

Virginia's 37th Senate District, 2023 general election
Party	Candidate	Votes	%
Democratic	Saddam Azlan Salim	40,947	68.69%
Republican	Ken Reid	18,427	30.91%
Write-in		238	0.40%
Total votes		59,612	100.00%
Democratic hold			

== District 38 ==
2023 Virginia Senate 38th District election
- November 7, 2023
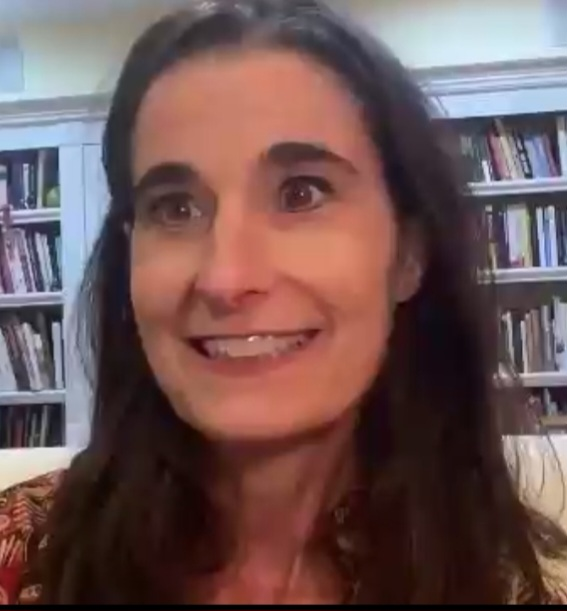

Candidate	Jennifer Boysko	Matthew Lang
Party	Democratic	Republican
Popular vote	47,623	21,742
Percentage	68.5%	31.3%
- Precinct results Boysko: 50–60% 60–70% 70–80% 80–90%
State senator before election
Jennifer Boysko
Democratic
Janet Howell
Democratic
Elected State senator
Jennifer Boysko
Democratic

Senate District 38 contains portions of Fairfax County. This district had two incumbents following redistricting: Democrat Jennifer Boysko, who was first elected in 2019, and Democrat Janet Howell, who was first elected in 1991.

=== Democratic primary ===
==== Nominee ====
- Jennifer Boysko, incumbent senator

==== Declined ====
- Janet Howell, incumbent senator

==== Endorsements ====
Jennifer Boysko

Organizations

- Giffords PAC

=== Republican primary ===
==== Nominee ====
- Matthew Lang, U.S. Navy veteran and nominee for HD-36 in 2021

=== General election ===
Predictions

Source	Ranking	As of
Elections Daily	Safe D	November 6, 2023
CNalysis	Solid D	September 8, 2023

Virginia's 38th Senate District, 2023 general election
Party	Candidate	Votes	%
Democratic	Jennifer Boysko (incumbent)	47,623	68.46%
Republican	Matthew Lang	21,742	31.25%
Write-in		200	0.29%
Total votes		69,565	100.00%
Democratic hold			

== District 39 ==
2023 Virginia Senate 39th District election
- November 7, 2023
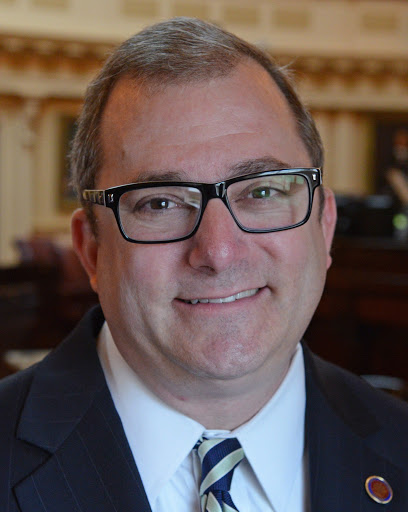
Candidate	Adam Ebbin	Sophia Moshasha
Party	Democratic	Republican
Popular vote	40,675	11,100
Percentage	78.3%	21.4%
- Precinct results Ebbin: 60–70% 70–80% 80–90%
State senator before election
Adam Ebbin
Democratic
Elected State senator
Adam Ebbin
Democratic

Senate District 39 contains the entire city of Alexandria, as well as portions of Arlington County and Fairfax County. The incumbent was Democrat Adam Ebbin, who was first elected in 2011.

=== Democratic primary ===
==== Nominee ====
- Adam Ebbin, incumbent senator

==== Endorsements ====
Adam Ebbin

Organizations

- Giffords PAC

=== Republican primary ===
==== Nominee ====
- Sophia Moshasha, VR technology advocate

=== General election ===
Predictions

Source	Ranking	As of
Elections Daily	Safe D	November 6, 2023
CNalysis	Solid D	September 8, 2023

Virginia's 39th Senate District, 2023 general election
Party	Candidate	Votes	%
Democratic	Adam Ebbin (incumbent)	40,675	78.30%
Republican	Sophia Moshasha	11,100	21.37%
Write-in		171	0.33%
Total votes		51,946	100.00%
Democratic hold			

== District 40 ==
2023 Virginia Senate 40th District election
- November 7, 2023
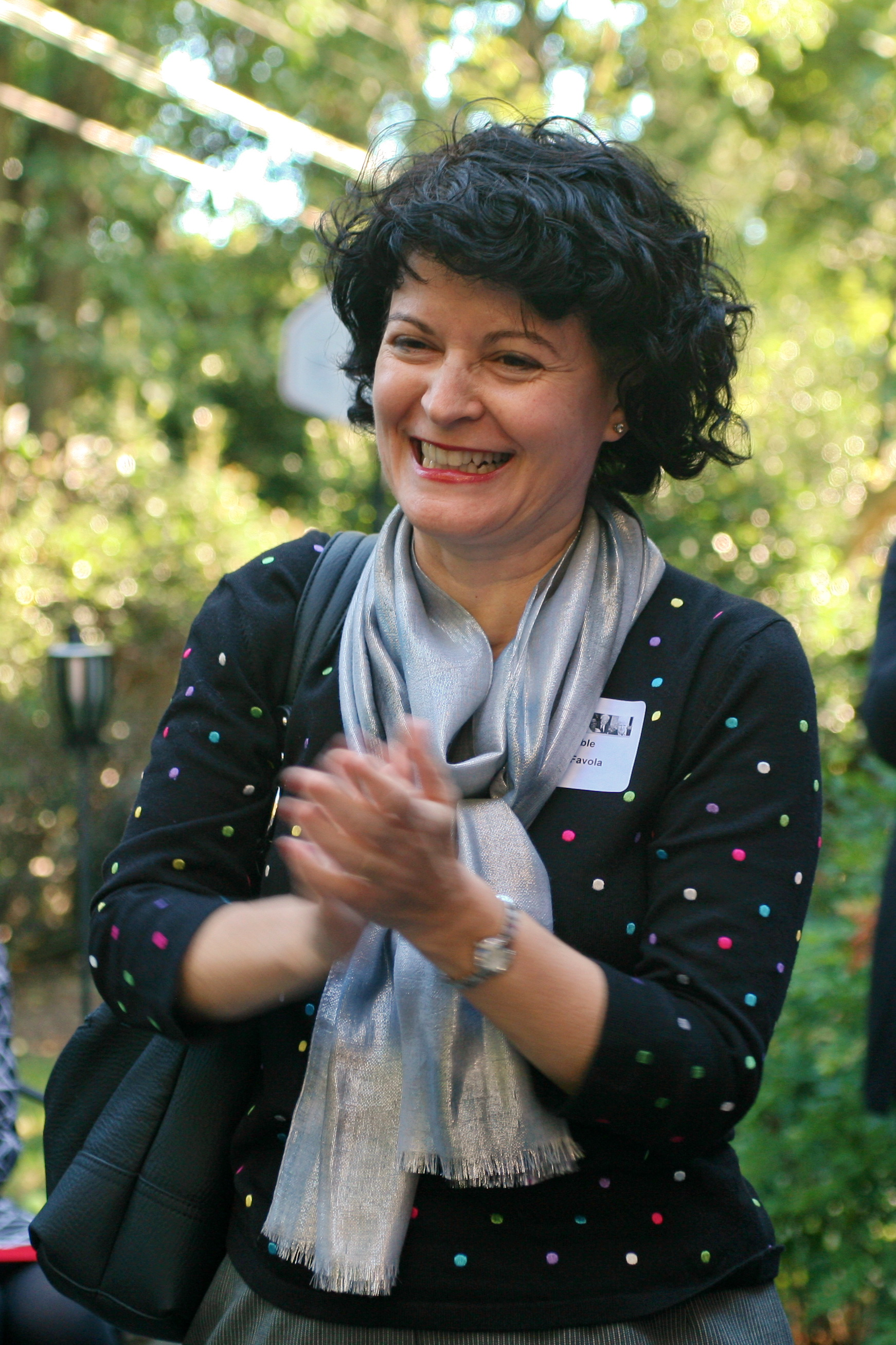
Candidate	Barbara Favola	David Henshaw
Party	Democratic	Republican
Popular vote	48,055	11,149
Percentage	80.9%	18.77%
- Precinct results Favola: 60–70% 70–80% 80–90%
State senator before election
Barbara Favola
Democratic
Elected State senator
Barbara Favola
Democratic

Senate District 40 contains portions of Arlington County. The incumbent was Democrat Barbara Favola, who was first elected in 2011.

=== Democratic primary ===
==== Nominee ====
- Barbara Favola, incumbent senator

==== Defeated in primary ====
- James DeVita, attorney

==== Endorsements ====
Barbara Favola

State legislators

- Jay Jones, state delegate for 89th district (2018-2021)

Organizations

- Giffords PAC

Newspapers

- The Washington Post

=== Republican primary ===
==== Nominee ====
- David Henshaw, U.S. Air Force veteran

==== Results ====
Virginia's 40th Senate District, 2023 Democratic primary
Party	Candidate	Votes	%
Democratic	Barbara Favola (incumbent)	21,424	83.74%
Democratic	James DeVita	4,160	16.26%
Total votes		25,584	100.00%

=== General election ===
Predictions

Source	Ranking	As of
Elections Daily	Safe D	November 6, 2023
CNalysis	Solid D	September 8, 2023

Virginia's 40th Senate District, 2023 general election
Party	Candidate	Votes	%
Democratic	Barbara Favola (incumbent)	48,055	80.92%
Republican	David Henshaw	11,149	18.77%
Write-in		182	0.31%
Total votes		59,386	100.00%
Democratic hold			

== See also ==
- 2023 Virginia House of Delegates election
- 2023 United States state legislative elections
- List of Virginia state legislatures
