= 2026 Virginia redistricting referendum =

Voided change to Virginia's congressional districts

- April 21, 2026 (Note: Early in-person voting was open from March 6 until April 18. On April 21, in-person voting was open from 6 a.m. until 7 p.m.)
- Question: Should the Constitution of Virginia be amended to allow the General Assembly to temporarily adopt new congressional districts to restore fairness in the upcoming elections, while ensuring Virginia's standard redistricting process resumes for all future redistricting after the 2030 census?
- Outcome: Proposal approved by voters; referendum nullified by the Supreme Court of Virginia

Results
Choice	Votes	%
Yes	1,604,276	51.69%
No	1,499,393	48.31%
Total votes	3,103,669	100.00%
Registered voters/turnout	6,386,877	48.59%

Yes
90–100%
80–90%
70–80%
60–70%
50–60%
No
90–100%
80–90%
70–80%
60–70%
50–60%

Virginia's congressional districts in effect since the 2022 elections Interactive map version

Virginia's congressional districts as proposed by the Virginia General Assembly for the 2026 redistricting referendum Interactive map version

The 2026 Virginia redistricting referendum was a proposed legislatively referred constitutional amendment that appeared before voters in the U.S. state of Virginia. The amendment would have authorized a mid-decade redrawing of the state's congressional districts for the 2026, 2028, and 2030 elections. The amendment passed by a slim margin in a referendum, but it was subsequently struck down by the Supreme Court of Virginia. As such, the power to draw the state's congressional districts was retained by a bipartisan commission, and was not given back to Virginia General Assembly, as the amendment had intended to do.

The proposed map was gerrymandered to favor Democrats in 10 out of 11 congressional districts, which would have represented a gain of four seats for the party. The amendment, mostly favored by Democrats and opposed by Republicans, was part of a larger, nationwide gerrymandering battle, and was proposed after Texas, California, and other U.S. states had engaged in mid-decade redistricting after the 2024 elections. It was first considered by Virginia lawmakers in October 2025, and was given preliminary approval on October 31. The Virginia General Assembly passed the amendment a second time on January 16, 2026.

The amendment faced numerous legal battles, with its first setback coming on January 27, 2026, when Virginia Judge Jack Hurley Jr. ruled it unlawful. Virginia Democrats appealed that decision, and on February 13, the Virginia Supreme Court allowed the referendum to proceed as scheduled while they reviewed the case. On February 19, Judge Hurley ruled the amendment to be unlawful on grounds unrelated to the original ruling and unrelated to the ruling of the Virginia Supreme Court, once again blocking the measure from appearing on the April ballot. The Virginia Supreme Court stayed that ruling on March 4, allowing for the referendum to be held.

Early voting was open from March 6 until April 18. On April 21, voters passed the referendum, with over 51% of votes cast in favor. The day after the vote, Judge Hurley issued an injunction against the certification and implementation of the results. Democratic Attorney General Jay Jones sought a stay on this ruling from the Supreme Court of Virginia, but the Court denied the request.

The Virginia Supreme Court struck down the amendment on May 8, 2026, on the grounds that the General Assembly did not follow a procedural requirement for amending the state's constitution when it placed the amendment before voters. An emergency appeal of this ruling was made to the U.S. Supreme Court, but it was rejected by the court on May 15.

== Background ==
=== 2020 amendment ===
In 2020, Virginia voters approved a constitutional amendment giving the power to draw congressional districts in the state to a bipartisan commission, which is composed of eight legislators and eight citizens. The measure was passed with 65% of votes in favor, and with every county and independent city of the state voting in support, except for Arlington County. Prior to this, the Virginia General Assembly held the power.

=== First passage of amendment legislation ===
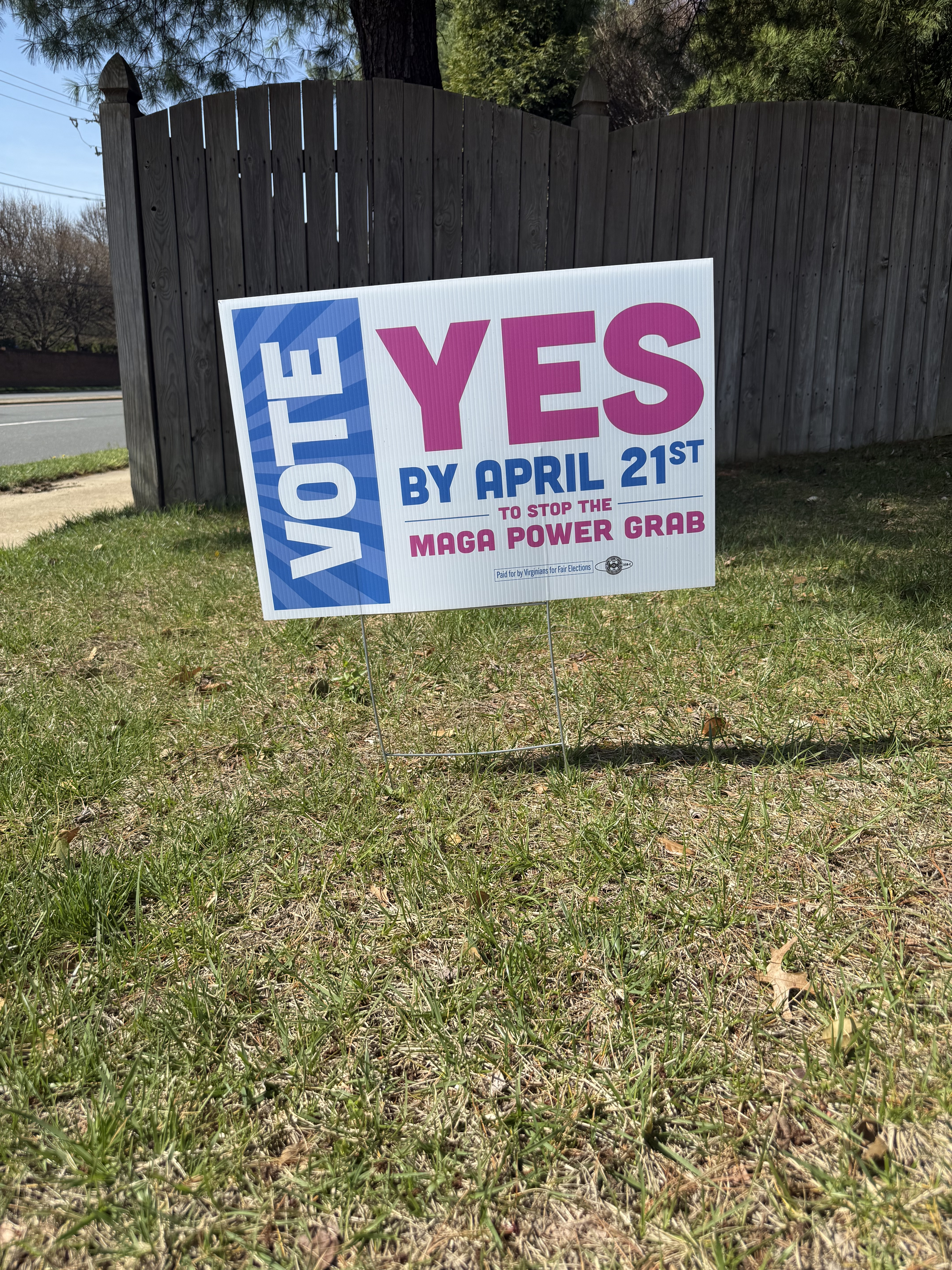
Sign advocating for a "Yes" vote on the referendum

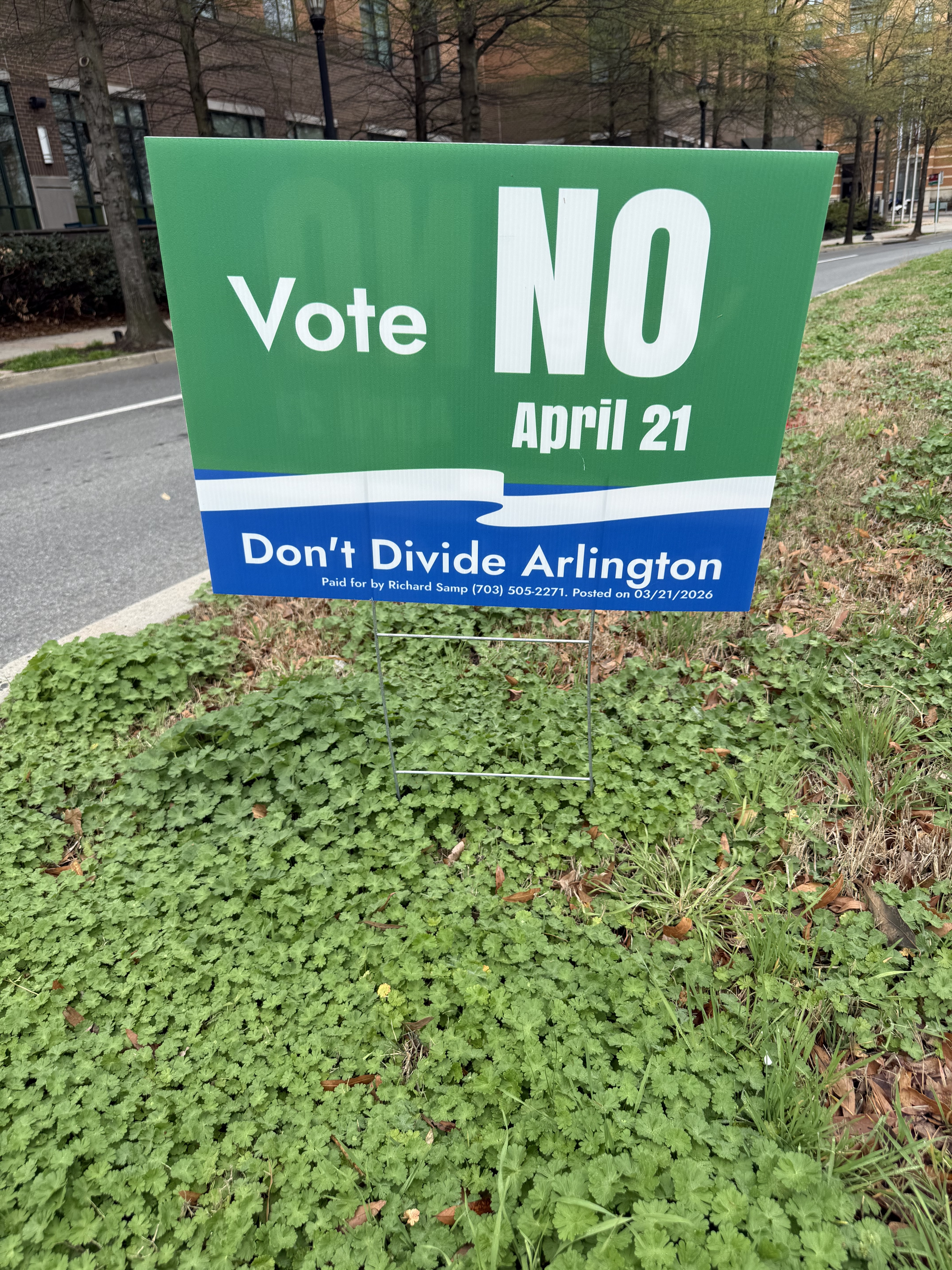
Sign advocating for a "No" vote on the referendum

In 2025, Texas lawmakers adopted a new congressional map with the aim of granting Republicans as many as five additional congressional seats. Other states, including California, followed suit with their own redistricting plans. On October 23, 2025, The New York Times reported that Virginia was planning a constitutional amendment to allow for redistricting, with the goal of the change being, according to Virginia Senate Majority Leader Scott Surovell, "address[ing] actions by the Trump administration."

In Virginia, constitutional amendments have to be approved by the legislature in two consecutive legislative sessions, with a general election in between them, prior to being sent to the public for final passage. On October 24, Democratic House Majority Leader Charniele Herring introduced a resolution to expand the scope of a 2024 special session to allow the Virginia General Assembly to consider constitutional amendments related to redistricting in the session. On October 27, the resolution was agreed to by the House of Delegates in a 50–42 vote, and on October 29, the state Senate agreed to it in a 21–17 vote.

On October 28, four Democratic Virginia Delegates introduced the redistricting constitutional amendment during the special session. On the same day, Jason Miyares, then the Republican Attorney General of Virginia who was also running for a second term in 2025, issued a non-binding opinion saying that the process required to add a constitutional amendment to the ballot cannot be shortened by the General Assembly calling a special session during an ongoing election.

On October 29, the Virginia House of Delegates passed the amendment in a 51–42 vote on party lines. Before the vote took place, there was contentious debate, and the Sergeant-at-Arms was called to the floor at one point. The bill then moved on to the Senate Privileges & Elections Committee, which approved the bill in an 8–6 vote the same day. The Senate passed the bill 21–16 on October 31, sending it to the 164th General Assembly for further consideration.

=== Second passage ===
Virginia Democrats retained and expanded their majority in the Virginia House of Delegates in the 2025 election, in addition to flipping all three executive offices. Upon winning the trifecta, Virginia Democrats intended to re-approve the amendment and send it to a referendum for voters’ consideration. As the amendment needed to be passed a second time, the Senate, on January 16, 2026, passed the constitutional amendment, following the House of Delegates which had done so earlier in the week. Governor Abigail Spanberger signed enabling legislation for the referendum on February 4.

== Contents and amendment ==
=== Ballot wording ===
On the ballot, voters were shown the following question:

Question: Should the Constitution of Virginia be amended to allow the General Assembly to temporarily adopt new congressional districts to restore fairness in the upcoming elections, while ensuring Virginia's standard redistricting process resumes for all future redistricting after the 2030 census?

=== Proposed constitutional changes ===
Had the amendment taken effect, the Virginia Constitution would have been amended as follows: (Note: Underlined text denotes added language, while struck text denotes deleted language.)

Article II

Franchise and Officers

Section 6. Apportionment.

Members of the House of Representatives of the United States and members of the Senate and of the House of Delegates of the General Assembly shall be elected from electoral districts established pursuant to this section and Section 6-A of this Constitution. Every electoral district shall be composed of contiguous and compact territory and shall be so constituted as to give, as nearly as is practicable, representation in proportion to the population of the district. Every electoral district shall be drawn in accordance with the requirements of federal and state laws that address racial and ethnic fairness, including the Equal Protection Clause of the Fourteenth Amendment to the Constitution of the United States and provisions of the Voting Rights Act of 1965, as amended, and judicial decisions interpreting such laws. Districts shall provide, where practicable, opportunities for racial and ethnic communities to elect candidates of their choice. The Commonwealth shall be reapportioned into electoral districts in accordance with this section and Section 6-A in the year 2021 and every ten years thereafter, except that the General Assembly shall be authorized to modify one or more congressional districts at any point following the adoption of a decennial reapportionment law, but prior to the next decennial census, in the event that any State of the United States of America conducts a redistricting of such state's congressional districts at any point following that state's adoption of a decennial reapportionment law for any purpose other than (i) the completion of the state's decennial redistricting in response to a federal census and reapportionment mandated by the Constitution of the United States and established in federal law or (ii) as ordered by any state or federal court to remedy an unlawful or unconstitutional district map. Any such decennial reapportionment law, or reapportionment law modifying one or more congressional districts, shall take effect immediately and not be subject to the limitations contained in Article IV, Section 13, of this Constitution. The districts delineated in ~~the decennial~~ any reapportionment law shall be implemented for the November general election for the United States House of Representatives, Senate, or House of Delegates, respectively, that is held immediately prior to the expiration of the term being served in the year that the reapportionment law is ~~required to be~~ enacted. A member in office at the time that a ~~decennial~~ redistricting law is enacted shall complete his term of office and shall continue to represent the district from which he was elected for the duration of such term of office so long as he does not move his residence from the district from which he was elected. Any vacancy occurring during such term shall be filled from the same district that elected the member whose vacancy is being filled.

Schedule

Section 6. Application and duration of certain redistricting amendments.

The authorization in Article II, Section 6 authorizing the General Assembly to modify one or more congressional districts at any point following adoption of a decennial reapportionment law in the event that any State of the United States of America conducts a redistricting of such state's congressional districts at any point following that state's adoption of a decennial reapportionment law shall be limited to making such modifications between January 1, 2025, and October 31, 2030, in response to actions taken by another state between January 1, 2025, and October 31, 2030.

=== Replacement map ===
On February 20, 2026, the Virginia General Assembly passed and Governor Spanberger signed legislation drawing a new congressional map for Virginia, which was to take effect should voters approve the amendment. The map was considered a Democratic gerrymander, which, based on previous election results, would have favored Democrats in 10 out of the 11 districts. This would have been an increase from the 6 they won in the 2024 congressional elections. The University of Virginia Center for Politics believed that two of the Democratic-favored districts could potentially be competitive for Republicans, and described the map as "baconmandered," where strongly-Democratic Northern Virginia was cut up across multiple districts stretching to the rest of the state. Notable county split increases included Prince William County, which would have gone from two congressional districts to five, and Fairfax County, which would have gone from three congressional districts to five. Sabato's Crystal Ball rated the putative 9th district as Safe Republican, the putative 2nd district as Tossup, the putative 6th district as Leans Democratic, the putative 5th district as Likely Democratic, and the putative 1st, 3rd, 4th, 7th, 8th, 10th and 11th districts as Safe Democratic.

Electoral results

2021 gubernatorial election

District	Old map			New map		
District	Dem	Rep	Margin	Dem	Rep	Margin
1	41.4%	58.0%	16.6%	49.7%	49.6%	0.1%
2	44.2%	55.1%	10.9%	44.9%	54.4%	9.5%
3	63.3%	35.5%	27.9%	61.3%	37.5%	23.8%
4	61.4%	37.0%	24.4%	53.0%	45.7%	7.3%
5	39.4%	60.0%	20.5%	47.9%	51.2%	3.2%
6	33.1%	66.2%	33.1%	47.2%	52.0%	4.8%
7	47.0%	52.2%	5.2%	49.8%	49.6%	0.2%
8	72.3%	27.0%	45.2%	55.3%	44.0%	11.3%
9	24.8%	74.6%	49.7%	22.6%	76.8%	54.2%
10	50.7%	48.7%	2.0%	53.0%	46.4%	6.6%
11	64.3%	35.0%	29.3%	53.7%	45.7%	7.9%

2024 presidential election

District	Old map			New map		
District	Dem	Rep	Margin	Dem	Rep	Margin
1	46.7%	51.6%	4.9%	52.5%	44.9%	7.5%
2	49.1%	49.3%	0.3%	49.8%	48.5%	1.3%
3	66.4%	31.8%	34.6%	64.6%	33.7%	30.9%
4	65.4%	32.8%	32.6%	57.2%	41.3%	15.9%
5	43.2%	55.4%	12.2%	53.3%	44.8%	8.5%
6	37.2%	61.2%	24.1%	50.6%	47.5%	3.1%
7	50.3%	47.4%	2.8%	52.8%	44.8%	8.0%
8	73.0%	23.8%	49.3%	57.6%	40.1%	17.5%
9	27.5%	71.4%	43.9%	25.0%	74.0%	49.0%
10	52.6%	44.3%	8.3%	54.6%	42.2%	12.4%
11	65.2%	31.2%	34.0%	55.3%	41.8%	13.4%

== Campaign ==
The campaign was the most expensive for any ballot measure in Virginia's history, with over $83 million spent during the campaign. As of April 16, $93 million had been raised, with 95% of funding raised by dark money groups not required to disclose their donors.

=== Support ===
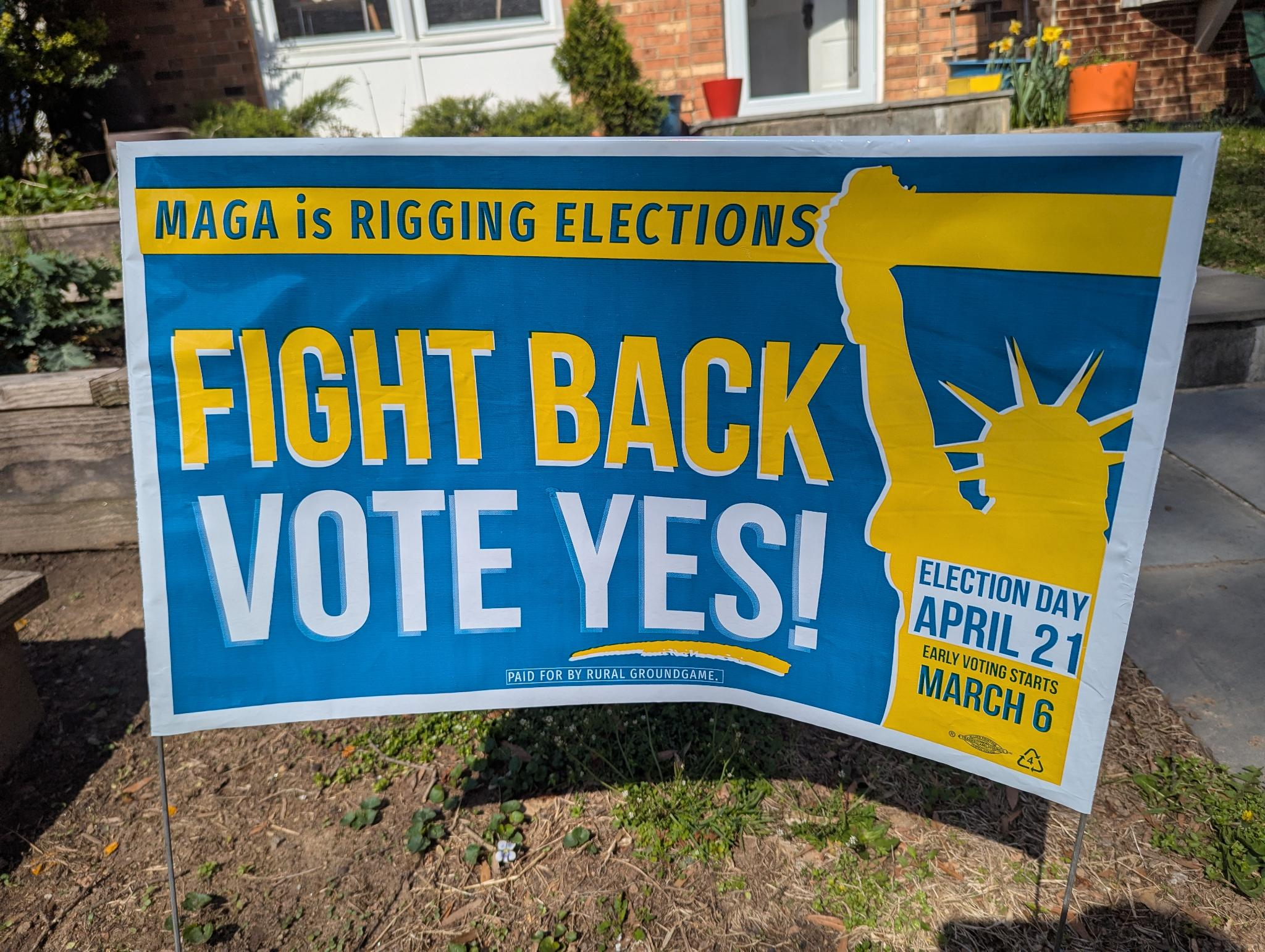
A pro-referendum yard sign in Virginia

As of April 6, the main Democratic-aligned group supporting the referendum, Virginians for Fair Elections, had raised $64 million, including $40 million from House Majority Forward, a group aligned with House Democratic leaders; $12 million from the Fairness Project; and $5 million from the Fund for Policy Reform, founded by George Soros. Mark Warner and Tim Kaine contributed $100,000 through their leadership PACs. By April 6, the group had spent $39.1 million in advertising. Key figures in support of the amendment included governor Abigail Spanberger and former president Barack Obama. A billboard by the Page County Democratic Committee implied that president Donald Trump was in favor of the amendment.

=== Opposition ===
As of April 6, the main Republican-aligned group opposing the referendum, Virginians for Fair Maps, had raised around $20 million, the majority of which came from a group of the same name which had not disclosed its donors. By April 6, the group had spent $4.8 million in advertising.

The Justice for Democracy PAC, a group largely financed by Peter Thiel, raised over $9 million. The group utilized imagery from the civil rights movement and of the KKK in its advertising, alleging that the amendment would lead to "black and brown voices silenced". It also sent mailers implying that former president Barack Obama opposed the amendment. The NAACP and civil rights leaders condemned the ads as misinformation.

Additionally, the Justice for Democracy PAC sent mailers implying that Governor Abigail Spanberger opposed the amendment, using a 2019 quote in which she referred to gerrymandering as "detrimental to our democracy." Both President Obama and Governor Spanberger had endorsed the amendment.

The bipartisan group No Gerrymandering Virginia launched in February 2026 with an advisory council consisting of George Allen, William J. Howell, William Fralin, Chap Petersen, and Brian Cannon.

=== Sign theft ===
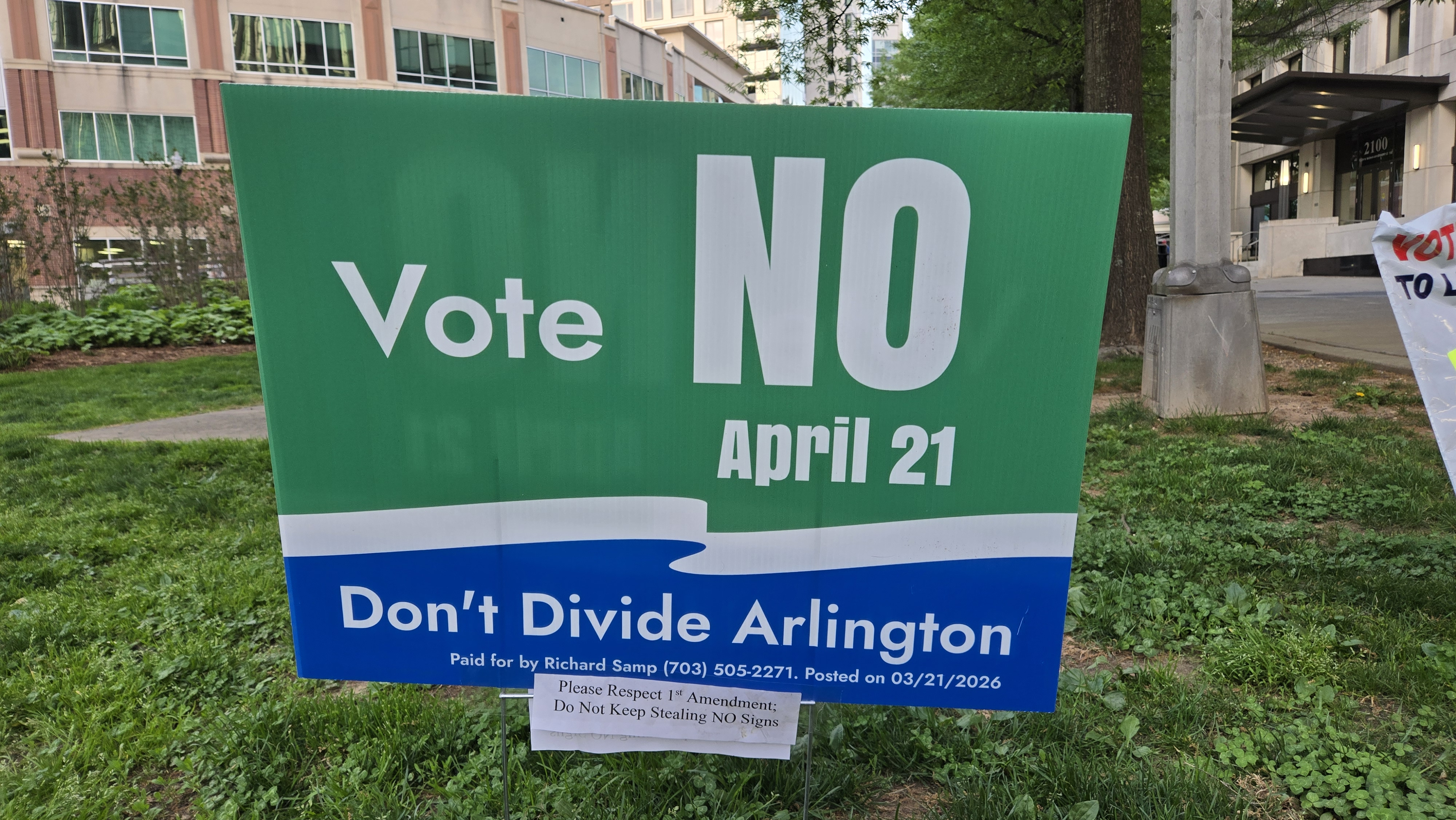
A "Vote No" sign including an added note reading, "Please Respect 1st Amendment; Do Not Keep Stealing NO Signs"

Both pro- and anti-referendum signs were stolen. In Isle of Wight County, for example, the chairman of the county's Republican chapter reported that more than 50 opposition signs were stolen, and the county's Democratic chapter reported that several signs in support were stolen. In Petersburg, a surveillance camera recorded an individual stealing a "Vote No" sign.

== Endorsements ==
=== Support ===
Arguments in favor of the measure included that it was a temporary change, that it intended to counteract other states that had gerrymandered their congressional maps, and that it allowed voters to decide whether to redistrict, rather than only politicians.

Yes

Executive branch officials

- Hillary Clinton former U.S. secretary of state (2009–2013) (Democratic)
- Eric Holder, former U.S. attorney general (2009–2015) (Democratic)
- Barack Obama, former president of the United States (2009–2017) (Democratic)
- Tom Perriello, former U.S. special envoy for Sudan (2024–2025) (Democratic)

U.S. senators

- Tim Kaine, Virginia (2013–present) (Democratic)
- Mark Warner, Virginia (2009–present) (Democratic)

U.S. representatives

- Don Beyer, VA-08 (2015–present) (Democratic)
- Hakeem Jeffries, House minority leader (2023–present) from NY-08 (2013–present) (Democratic)
- Adam Kinzinger, former IL-16 (2011–2023) (Republican)
- Jennifer McClellan, VA-04 (2023–present) (Democratic)
- Nancy Pelosi, former speaker of the House (2007–2011, 2019–2023) from CA-11 (1987–present) (Democratic)
- Bobby Scott, VA-03 (1993–present) (Democratic)
- Suhas Subramanyam, VA-10 (2025–present) (Democratic)
- Eugene Vindman, VA-07 (2025–present) (Democratic)
- James Walkinshaw, VA-11 (2025–present) (Democratic)

Statewide officials

- Ghazala Hashmi, lieutenant governor of Virginia (2026–present) (Democratic)
- Jay Jones, attorney general of Virginia (2026–present) (Democratic)
- Gavin Newsom, governor of California (2019–present) (Democratic)
- Ralph Northam, former governor of Virginia (2018–2022) (Democratic)
- Abigail Spanberger, governor of Virginia (2026–present) (Democratic)

State legislators

- Lamont Bagby, SD-14 (2023–present) (Democratic)
- Katrina Callsen, HD-54 (2024–present) (Democratic)
- Nicole Cole, HD-66 (2026–present) (Democratic)
- Creigh Deeds, SD-11 (2001–present) (Democratic)
- Michael Feggans, HD-97 (2024–present) (Democratic)
- Cliff Hayes Jr., HD-91 (2017–present) (Democratic)
- L. Louise Lucas, Senate president pro tempore (2020–present) from SD-18 (1992–present) (Democratic)
- Marcia Price, HD-85 (2016–present) (Democratic)
- Don Scott, speaker of the House (2024–present) from HD-80 (2020–present) (Democratic)
- Marcus Simon, HD-13 (2014–present) (Democratic)
- Scott Surovell, Senate majority leader (2024–present) from SD-34 (2016–present) (Democratic)
- David Toscano, former House minority leader (2011–2018) from HD-57 (2006–2020) (Democratic)
- Schuyler VanValkenburg, SD-16 (2024–present) (Democratic)
- Rodney Willett, HD-58 (2020–present) (Democratic)

Individuals

- Beth Macy, author and Democratic candidate for Virginia's 6th congressional district in 2026
- Kelley Robinson, president of the Human Rights Campaign

Labor unions

- SEIU Virginia

Organizations

- CASA in Action
- Courier Newsroom
- Democratic Congressional Campaign Committee
- Fairness Project
- Human Rights Campaign
- NAACP Virginia
- National Democratic Redistricting Committee
- Planned Parenthood Virginia
- Virginia League of Conservation Voters
- Virginia Legislative Black Caucus

Political parties

- Democratic Party of Virginia

=== Opposition ===
Arguments in opposition included that it was a partisan gerrymander, that rural and conservative voters would have their voice diluted, and that Virginia voters already decided on the issue in 2020, approving a bipartisan commission.

No

Executive branch officials

- Ken Cuccinelli, former acting deputy secretary of homeland security (2019–2021) (Republican)
- Jim Gilmore, former U.S. ambassador to the Organization for Security and Cooperation in Europe (2019–2021) (Republican)
- Donald Trump, president of the United States (2017–2021, 2025–present) (Republican)
- JD Vance, vice president of the United States (2025–present) (Republican)

U.S. senators

- George Allen, Virginia (2001–2007) (Republican)

U.S. representatives

- Eric Cantor, former House majority leader (2011–2014) from VA-07 (2001–2014) (Republican)
- Ben Cline, VA-06 (2019–present) (Republican)
- Morgan Griffith, VA-09 (2011–present) (Republican)
- Mike Johnson, speaker of the House (2023–present) from LA-04 (2017–present) (Republican)
- Jen Kiggans, VA-02 (2023–present) (Republican)
- John McGuire, VA-05 (2025–present) (Republican)
- Rob Wittman, VA-01 (2007–present) (Republican)

Statewide officials

- Winsome Earle-Sears, former lieutenant governor of Virginia (2022–2026) (Republican)
- Bob McDonnell, former governor of Virginia (2010–2014) (Republican)
- Jason Miyares, former attorney general of Virginia (2022–2026) (Republican)
- Glenn Youngkin, former governor of Virginia (2022–2026) (Republican)

State legislators

- Luther Cifers, SD-10 (2025–present) (Republican)
- William Fralin, former HD-17 (2004–2010) (Republican)
- Tom Garrett, HD-56 (2024–present) (Republican)
- Dan Greenberg, former Arkansas's HD-31 (2006–2011) (Republican)
- Tim Griffin, HD-53 (2024–present) (Republican)
- Karen Hamilton, HD-62 (2026–present) (Republican)
- Chris Head, SD-03 (2024–present) (Republican)
- Terry Kilgore, House minority leader (2025–present) from HD-45 (1994–present) (Republican)
- Joseph McNamara, HD-40 (2018–present) (Republican)
- Joe Morrissey, former SD-16 (2020–2024), former HD-74 (2008–2014, 2015) (Democratic)
- Mark Obenshain, SD-02 (2004–present) (Republican)
- Chap Petersen, former SD-34 (2008-2024)(Democratic)
- Mark Peake, SD-08 (2017–present) (Republican)
- Justin Pence, HD-33 (2026–present) (Republican)
- Chris Runion, HD-35 (2020–present) (Republican)
- Phillip Scott, HD-63 (2022–present) (Republican)
- Bill Stanley, SD-07 (2011–present) (Republican)
- Wendell Walker, HD-52 (2020–present) (Republican)
- Wren Williams, HD-47 (2022–present) (Republican)
- Tony Wilt, HD-34 (2010–present) (Republican)
- Eric Zehr, HD-51 (2023–present) (Republican)

Individuals

- Jonathan Falwell, chancellor of Liberty University
- George Landrith, president of the Frontiers of Freedom Institute (Republican)
- Scott Presler, conservative activist (Republican)
- Jason Redman, retired naval officer and U.S. Navy Seal

Organizations

- Concerned Women for America
- Conservative Political Action Conference
- Family Foundation of Virginia
- Freedom Caucus Fund
- Virginia Society for Human Life

Government bodies

- Amherst County Board of Supervisors
- Augusta County Board of Supervisors
- Bedford County Board of Supervisors
- Nelson County Board of Supervisors
- Pittsylvania County Board of Supervisors
- Roanoke County Board of Supervisors
- Rockingham County Board of Supervisors
- Washington County Board of Supervisors

Political parties

- Republican Party of Virginia
- Forward Party

Newspapers

- National Review
- The Washington Post

== Polling ==
View source data.

Poll source	Date(s) administered	Sample size (Note: Key: A – all adults RV – registered voters LV – likely voters V – unclear)	Margin of error	Phrasing	Support	Oppose	Undecided
State Navigate	April 10–13, 2026	707 (Note: "Registered likely special election voters".)	± 3.7%	"On April 21st, Virginians will vote "yes" or "no" on the following amendment to the state constitution: "Should the Constitution of Virginia be amended to allow the General Assembly to temporarily adopt new congressional districts to restore fairness in the upcoming elections, while ensuring Virginia's standard redistricting process resumes for all future redistricting after the 2030 census? - [IF NOT ALREADY VOTED] Do you plan to vote yes or no on this amendment? [IF ALREADY VOTED] Did you vote yes or no on this amendment?"	51%	45%	4%
Neighborhood Research	April 1–3, 2026	319 (LV)	± 5.5%	"Will you (or did you) vote yes or no on the redistricting referendum?"	45%	46%	9%
The Washington Post/Schar School of Policy and Government	March 26–31, 2026	1,101 (LV)	± 3.4%	The official ballot question for the special election reads as follows: Should the Constitution of Virginia be amended to allow the General Assembly to temporarily adopt new congressional districts to restore fairness in the upcoming elections, while ensuring Virginia's standard redistricting process resumes for all future redistricting after the 2030 census? If the election were held today, would you vote yes or no on this ballot question?	52%	47%	2%
Cor Strategies (R) (Note: Poll sponsored by Heritage Action)	March 20–24, 2026	814 (LV)	± 3.4%	The first part of this ballot language says, “Should the Constitution of Virginia be amended to allow the General Assembly to temporarily adopt new congressional districts to restore fairness in the upcoming elections?” Based on this ballot language alone, would support or oppose this amendment?	45%	36%	18%
Roanoke College	February 9–16, 2026	800 (A)	± 4.4%	The General Assembly passed an amendment to the Virginia Constitution allowing them to do mid-decade redistricting and approved a new map which is thought to favor Democrats in 10 of the 11 congressional districts in Virginia. A special election must be held for voters to approve the amendment before any mid-decade redistricting can take effect. If you had to decide today, would you vote to approve the amendment to allow mid-decade redistricting, or keep the current process as it is now?	44%	52%	4%
Christopher Newport University	January 13–20, 2026	807 (RV)	± 4.4%	As you may know, a constitutional amendment is being considered by the General Assembly to temporarily change when Virginia's congressional districts can be redrawn. This amendment is being considered in response to other states that are redrawing districts outside of the normal 10-year census cycle, and would allow the General Assembly to redraw congressional maps between 2026 and 2030. If passed, the proposed amendment would go on a statewide ballot for voters to ultimately decide. Would you support or oppose this redistricting constitutional amendment?	51%	43%	7%

== Results ==
Results of the referendum by state senate district. Yes: 80–90%; 70–80%; 60–70%; 50–60%; No: 80–90%; 70–80%; 60–70%; 50–60%

39 counties and independent cities voted in favor, and 94 voted against. The highest level of support for the amendment came from Petersburg, with 86.97% of its vote in favor, and the lowest level came from Lee County, with 11.01% of its vote in favor. Results for the referendum remain unofficial, because the Virginia Board of Elections was not able to certify the results during its May 1, 2026, meeting due to a court ruling.

Unofficial results (excluding invalid votes)
Yes; 1,604,276 (51.7%)	No; 1,499,393 (48.3%)
▲50%

=== By county and independent city ===
Locality	Yes		No		Margin		Total votes cast
Locality	#	%	#	%	#	%	Total votes cast
Accomack	5,119	41.58%	7,192	58.42%	−2,073	−16.84%	12,311
Albemarle	32,036	64.92%	17,308	35.08%	14,728	29.85%	49,344
Alexandria	41,191	78.98%	10,963	21.02%	30,228	57.96%	52,154
Alleghany	1,283	22.38%	4,450	77.62%	−3,167	−55.24%	5,733
Amelia	1,473	23.90%	4,689	76.10%	−3,216	−52.19%	6,162
Amherst	3,612	28.02%	9,280	71.98%	−5,668	−43.97%	12,892
Appomattox	1,431	19.53%	5,897	80.47%	−4,466	−60.94%	7,328
Arlington	67,223	79.94%	16,866	20.06%	50,357	59.89%	84,089
Augusta	7,456	21.86%	26,653	78.14%	−19,197	−56.28%	34,109
Bath	351	18.92%	1,504	81.08%	−1,153	−62.16%	1,855
Bedford	8,094	20.99%	30,469	79.01%	−22,375	−58.02%	38,563
Bland	311	12.44%	2,188	87.56%	−1,877	−75.11%	2,499
Botetourt	4,007	23.94%	12,733	76.06%	−8,726	−52.13%	16,740
Bristol	1,253	28.54%	3,137	71.46%	−1,884	−42.92%	4,390
Brunswick	2,906	51.74%	2,711	48.26%	195	3.47%	5,617
Buchanan	630	11.94%	4,647	88.06%	−4,017	−76.12%	5,277
Buckingham	2,104	35.48%	3,826	64.52%	−1,722	−29.04%	5,930
Buena Vista	446	24.33%	1,387	75.67%	−941	−51.34%	1,833
Campbell	4,856	21.78%	17,443	78.22%	−12,587	−56.45%	22,299
Caroline	5,383	43.81%	6,905	56.19%	−1,522	−12.39%	12,288
Carroll	1,816	15.70%	9,749	84.30%	−7,933	−68.59%	11,565
Charles City	1,531	51.12%	1,464	48.88%	67	2.24%	2,995
Charlotte	1,292	28.37%	3,262	71.63%	−1,970	−43.26%	4,554
Charlottesville	13,436	85.41%	2,295	14.59%	11,141	70.82%	15,731
Chesapeake	44,194	50.94%	42,566	49.06%	1,628	1.88%	86,760
Chesterfield	81,265	53.50%	70,620	46.50%	10,645	7.01%	151,885
Clarke	2,814	38.53%	4,489	61.47%	−1,675	−22.94%	7,303
Colonial Heights	2,004	32.42%	4,178	67.58%	−2,174	−35.17%	6,182
Covington	510	32.22%	1,073	67.78%	−563	−35.57%	1,583
Craig	350	15.49%	1,909	84.51%	−1,559	−69.01%	2,259
Culpeper	7,032	35.12%	12,988	64.88%	−5,956	−29.75%	20,020
Cumberland	1,444	35.49%	2,625	64.51%	−1,181	−29.02%	4,069
Danville	6,484	57.33%	4,826	42.67%	1,658	14.66%	11,310
Dickenson	714	16.63%	3,579	83.37%	−2,865	−66.74%	4,293
Dinwiddie	4,106	36.98%	6,998	63.02%	−2,892	−26.04%	11,104
Emporia	944	62.15%	575	37.85%	369	24.29%	1,519
Essex	1,894	42.33%	2,580	57.67%	−686	−15.33%	4,474
Fairfax City	6,204	67.11%	3,040	32.89%	3,164	34.23%	9,244
Fairfax County	269,116	69.68%	117,075	30.32%	152,041	39.37%	386,191
Falls Church	5,309	80.81%	1,261	19.19%	4,048	61.61%	6,570
Fauquier	11,513	35.82%	20,630	64.18%	−9,117	−28.36%	32,143
Floyd	2,115	29.44%	5,069	70.56%	−2,954	−41.12%	7,184
Fluvanna	5,682	45.27%	6,868	54.73%	−1,186	−9.45%	12,550
Franklin City	1,607	59.99%	1,072	40.01%	535	19.97%	2,679
Franklin County	5,493	23.66%	17,726	76.34%	−12,233	−52.69%	23,219
Frederick	12,959	34.79%	24,293	65.21%	−11,334	−30.43%	37,252
Fredericksburg	5,738	65.99%	2,957	34.01%	2,781	31.98%	8,695
Galax	466	25.73%	1,345	74.27%	−879	−48.54%	1,811
Giles	1,339	21.09%	5,010	78.91%	−3,671	−57.82%	6,349
Gloucester	4,808	28.01%	12,356	71.99%	−7,548	−43.98%	17,164
Goochland	5,945	37.10%	10,079	62.90%	−4,134	−25.80%	16,024
Grayson	1,011	16.48%	5,122	83.52%	−4,111	−67.03%	6,133
Greene	3,168	35.36%	5,791	64.64%	−2,623	−29.28%	8,959
Greensville	1,677	53.37%	1,465	46.63%	212	6.75%	3,142
Halifax	4,576	35.62%	8,270	64.38%	−3,694	−28.76%	12,846
Hampton	30,249	70.70%	12,533	29.30%	17,716	41.41%	42,782
Hanover	18,812	33.58%	37,206	66.42%	−18,394	−32.84%	56,018
Harrisonburg	7,009	65.28%	3,728	34.72%	3,281	30.56%	10,737
Henrico	82,854	63.91%	46,794	36.09%	36,060	27.81%	129,648
Henry	5,114	30.09%	11,881	69.91%	−6,767	−39.82%	16,995
Highland	269	23.45%	878	76.55%	−609	−53.10%	1,147
Hopewell	3,251	56.29%	2,524	43.71%	727	12.59%	5,775
Isle of Wight	7,142	38.80%	11,266	61.20%	−4,124	−22.40%	18,408
James City	19,520	50.34%	19,259	49.66%	261	0.67%	38,779
King and Queen	1,070	33.87%	2,089	66.13%	−1,019	−32.26%	3,159
King George	3,822	34.31%	7,319	65.69%	−3,497	−31.39%	11,141
King William	2,407	27.63%	6,306	72.37%	−3,899	−44.75%	8,713
Lancaster	2,362	40.65%	3,449	59.35%	−1,087	−18.71%	5,811
Lee	696	11.01%	5,625	88.99%	−4,929	−77.98%	6,321
Lexington	1,179	61.57%	736	38.43%	443	23.13%	1,915
Loudoun	89,827	60.81%	57,901	39.19%	31,926	21.61%	147,728
Louisa	6,110	33.82%	11,954	66.18%	−5,844	−32.35%	18,064
Lunenburg	1,547	35.18%	2,851	64.82%	−1,304	−29.65%	4,398
Lynchburg	10,840	43.31%	14,186	56.69%	−3,346	−13.37%	25,026
Madison	1,859	29.81%	4,378	70.19%	−2,519	−40.39%	6,237
Manassas	6,423	62.00%	3,937	38.00%	2,486	24.00%	10,360
Manassas Park	2,294	66.15%	1,174	33.85%	1,120	32.30%	3,468
Martinsville	2,079	58.76%	1,459	41.24%	620	17.52%	3,538
Mathews	1,276	27.14%	3,426	72.86%	−2,150	−45.73%	4,702
Mecklenburg	3,930	34.07%	7,606	65.93%	−3,676	−31.87%	11,536
Middlesex	1,781	32.74%	3,659	67.26%	−1,878	−34.52%	5,440
Montgomery	16,188	50.13%	16,104	49.87%	84	0.26%	32,292
Nelson	3,249	45.03%	3,966	54.97%	−717	−9.94%	7,215
New Kent	4,045	31.10%	8,962	68.90%	−4,917	−37.80%	13,007
Newport News	32,747	64.73%	17,842	35.27%	14,905	29.46%	50,589
Norfolk	40,089	71.53%	15,955	28.47%	24,134	43.06%	56,044
Northampton	2,636	51.47%	2,485	48.53%	151	2.95%	5,121
Northumberland	2,265	35.35%	4,143	64.65%	−1,878	−29.31%	6,408
Norton	217	24.33%	675	75.67%	−458	−51.35%	892
Nottoway	1,829	36.03%	3,247	63.97%	−1,418	−27.94%	5,076
Orange	5,876	35.97%	10,459	64.03%	−4,583	−28.06%	16,335
Page	1,860	19.86%	7,506	80.14%	−5,646	−60.28%	9,366
Patrick	1,189	17.22%	5,716	82.78%	−4,527	−65.56%	6,905
Petersburg	7,387	86.97%	1,107	13.03%	6,280	73.93%	8,494
Pittsylvania	6,091	24.65%	18,622	74.35%	−12,531	−50.71%	24,713
Poquoson	1,429	23.91%	4,548	76.09%	−3,119	−52.18%	5,977
Portsmouth	19,600	70.67%	8,134	29.33%	11,466	41.34%	27,734
Powhatan	4,001	24.86%	12,092	75.14%	−8,091	−50.28%	16,093
Prince Edward	3,174	45.75%	3,764	54.25%	−590	−8.50%	6,938
Prince George	4,694	37.10%	7,957	62.90%	−3,263	−25.79%	12,651
Prince William	92,401	63.03%	54,201	36.97%	38,200	26.06%	146,602
Pulaski	3,023	24.56%	9,285	75.44%	−6,262	−50.88%	12,308
Radford	2,008	48.08%	2,168	51.92%	−160	−3.83%	4,176
Rappahannock	1,537	39.40%	2,364	60.60%	−827	−21.20%	3,901
Richmond City	62,572	83.00%	12,815	17.00%	49,757	66.00%	75,387
Richmond County	928	30.44%	2,121	69.56%	−1,193	−39.13%	3,049
Roanoke City	17,128	61.62%	10,666	38.38%	6,462	23.25%	27,794
Roanoke County	14,592	36.07%	25,864	63.93%	−11,272	−27.86%	40,456
Rockbridge	2,732	27.86%	7,073	72.14%	−4,341	−44.27%	9,805
Rockingham	9,015	24.80%	27,342	75.20%	−18,327	−50.41%	36,357
Russell	1,181	13.02%	7,889	86.98%	−6,708	−73.96%	9,070
Salem	3,230	37.36%	5,416	62.64%	−2,186	−25.28%	8,646
Scott	870	11.48%	6,706	88.52%	−5,836	−77.03%	7,576
Shenandoah	4,659	25.40%	13,681	74.60%	−9,022	−49.19%	18,340
Smyth	1,560	15.95%	8,218	84.05%	−6,658	−68.09%	9,778
Southampton	2,513	35.25%	4,616	64.75%	−2,103	−29.50%	7,129
Spotsylvania	24,708	44.99%	30,206	55.01%	−5,498	−10.01%	54,914
Stafford	28,090	49.74%	28,389	50.26%	−299	−0.53%	56,479
Staunton	5,497	55.06%	4,487	44.94%	1,010	10.12%	9,984
Suffolk	21,862	57.61%	16,085	42.39%	5,777	15.22%	37,947
Surry	1,663	48.63%	1,757	51.37%	−94	−2.75%	3,420
Sussex	1,714	48.54%	1,817	51.46%	−103	−2.92%	3,531
Tazewell	1,584	12.39%	11,203	87.61%	−9,619	−75.22%	12,787
Virginia Beach	74,742	49.60%	75,946	50.40%	−1,204	−0.80%	150,688
Warren	4,761	29.39%	11,440	70.61%	−6,679	−41.23%	16,201
Washington	4,034	19.73%	16,409	80.27%	−12,375	−60.53%	20,443
Waynesboro	3,691	45.90%	4,350	54.10%	−659	−8.20%	8,041
Westmoreland	3,310	41.05%	4,753	58.95%	−1,443	−17.90%	8,063
Williamsburg	3,952	69.65%	1,722	30.35%	2,230	39.30%	5,674
Winchester	4,424	55.77%	3,508	44.23%	916	11.55%	7,932
Wise	1,471	14.57%	8,625	85.43%	−7,154	−70.86%	10,096
Wythe	1,912	17.43%	9,058	82.57%	−7,146	−65.14%	10,970
York	12,903	44.11%	16,352	55.89%	−3,449	−11.79%	29,255
Totals	1,604,276	51.69%	1,499,393	48.31%	104,883	3.38%	3,103,669

=== By congressional district ===
"Yes" won six of 11 congressional districts.

District	Yes	No	Representative
1st	45%	55%	Rob Wittman
2nd	48%	52%	Jen Kiggans
3rd	68%	32%	Bobby Scott
4th	66%	34%	Jennifer McClellan
5th	40%	60%	John McGuire
6th	35%	65%	Ben Cline
7th	52%	48%	Eugene Vindman
8th	76%	24%	Don Beyer
9th	25%	75%	Morgan Griffith
10th	56%	44%	Suhas Subramanyam
11th	69%	31%	James Walkinshaw

=== By proposed congressional district ===
Results of the referendum in the proposed congressional districts Yes: 60–70%; 50–60%; No: 70–80%; 50–60%

The referendum succeeded in nine of the 11 proposed districts. Its most favorable result came from the 3rd district, with 63% in favor, and its least favorable from the 9th, with 22% in favor.

District	Yes	No	
District	1st	54%	46%
2nd	51%	49%	
3rd	63%	37%	
4th	56%	44%	
5th	52%	48%	
6th	49%	51%	
7th	52%	48%	
8th	57%	43%	
9th	22%	78%	
10th	58%	42%	
11th	56%	44%	

Results of the referendum in the proposed 6th district Yes: 90–100%; 80–90%; 70–80%; 60–70%; 50–60%; No: 90–100%; 80–90%; 70–80%; 60–70%; 50–60%

In the proposed new 6th district, which was rated by Sabato's Crystal Ball as lean Democratic, the referendum was narrowly rejected, with about 51% opposed. The 6th district was made up of many college towns, including James Madison University, Liberty University, the University of Virginia, and Virginia Tech.

== Litigation ==
On October 28, 2025, a lawsuit was filed in Tazewell County Circuit Court against the House and Senate clerks, seeking an injunction against the referendum. The lawsuit argued that the purpose of the special session was to settle a budget dispute in 2024, and although the session was still technically open, the new bill was outside of the scope of the session, making it invalid. Delegate Terry Kilgore, state Senators Bill Stanley and Ryan McDougle, and a citizen member of the commonwealth's bipartisan redistricting commission were named as plaintiffs. The lawsuit was initially delayed, as the case's judge, Jack Hurley Jr., declined to intervene in legislative proceedings until the General Assembly had passed the amendment, resulting in Republican plaintiffs temporarily dropping the case. Judge Hurley ran for the Virginia House of Delegates in 1999 as a Republican.

Following the General Assembly's re-passage of the amendment to the ballot in January 2026, the case was expanded to request a ruling on all of the following:

1. Whether or not the General Assembly was able to pass a constitutional amendment during a special session not called to consider it;
2. Whether or not the General Assembly had violated a statutory mandate which requires it to post any proposed constitutional amendment at circuit clerk offices for public inspection at least 90 days before the election on which it would be voted on;
3. Whether or not the General Assembly's first passage had actually met the requirement to pass the amendment both before and after a general election, as early voting had started over a month prior to the first passage.

Hurley ordered both parties to submit briefs within 10 days.

On January 27, Hurley ruled that the amendment was unlawful, concurring both that the special session did not have the authority to pass such a measure and that the House of Delegates scheduled the election too early to satisfy the postage requirement. Hurley noted that, by the time of the 163rd Virginia General Assembly's first passage of the redistricting amendment, over 1 million Virginians had already voted in the 2025 election, over 33% of total turnout. For this, he agreed on the third and final question posed by the Republican plaintiffs, that being that the amendment did not sufficiently pass scrutiny since it was not passed "before the general election." The ruling blocked the amendment from going before voters.

Virginia Democratic leaders condemned the decision and announced an intention to appeal the ruling, with House Speaker Don Scott calling the case an example of “court-shopping, plain and simple." They also pointed out that the postage requirement was removed when Virginia adopted its current constitution, and is only still in effect because of an oversight in the state code. Later that day, the Virginia Senate passed SB769 (2026), which would repeal the 90-day postage requirement before the election and redirect the appellate process from the Court of Appeals of Virginia to the Circuit Court of the City of Richmond, which declined to block the 163rd General Assembly from passing the same amendment in November 2025. However, the House of Delegates did not take up this bill.

On February 13, the Supreme Court of Virginia allowed for the referendum to proceed as they considered the case. On February 18, the Republican National Committee filed a separate lawsuit, also in Tazewell county, asking for an emergency injunction to halt voting. The next day, February 19, Judge Hurley granted that motion, barring state officials from "administering, preparing for, taking any action to further the procedure of the referendum, or otherwise moving forward with causing an election to be held on the proposed constitutional amendment", citing the phrase "restore fairness" in the ballot language as misleading and unconstitutional. On March 4, the Virginia Supreme Court stayed that ruling, allowing early voting to begin on March 6. Briefs on the lawsuit were due to the Virginia Supreme Court two days after the April 21 election, and oral arguments were held the following Monday.

On April 22, Hurley issued a final order of judgment, ruling that the House bill that authorized the referendum was void ab initio as it violated two resolutions of the General Assembly, portions of the Virginia State Code, and the Constitution of Virginia. Hurley also permanently enjoined the State Board of Elections from certifying the results of the referendum and blocked the State Board from executing any changes that would be required to instate a new congressional map. Attorney General of Virginia Jay Jones appealed the ruling, however SCOVA declined to enter a stay blocking it from coming into effect. The State Board of Elections was therefore unable to certify the results at its May 1, 2026, meeting.

The amendment was stuck down by the Virginia Supreme Court on May 8, 2026, in a 4–3 decision that ruled that the legislature had violated the intervening election requirement when it was placed on the ballot. Virginia Democrats appealed the decision to the United States Supreme Court, but their appeal was rejected on May 15.

Following the ruling, some Democrats privately discussed lowering the mandatory retirement age for Virginia judges from 73 to 54. This would have forced all seven members of the Supreme Court of Virginia to retire, and allowed the General Assembly to elect their replacements, because the youngest justice was 54. This proposal never advanced beyond preliminary discussions, and both Senate Majority Leader Scott Surovell and Governor Abigail Spanberger opposed it.

== See also ==
- 2026 Virginia elections
- Redistricting in Virginia
- 2025 California Proposition 50
- 2025 Indiana redistricting attempt
- 2025 Texas redistricting
- 2026 Florida redistricting
- 2026 Maryland Question 3
- 2026 Missouri Proposition A
- 2026 Tennessee redistricting
- 2026 United States ballot measures

== Notes ==
Partisan clients
