= 164th Virginia General Assembly =

US state legislative body

←	163rd	165th	→
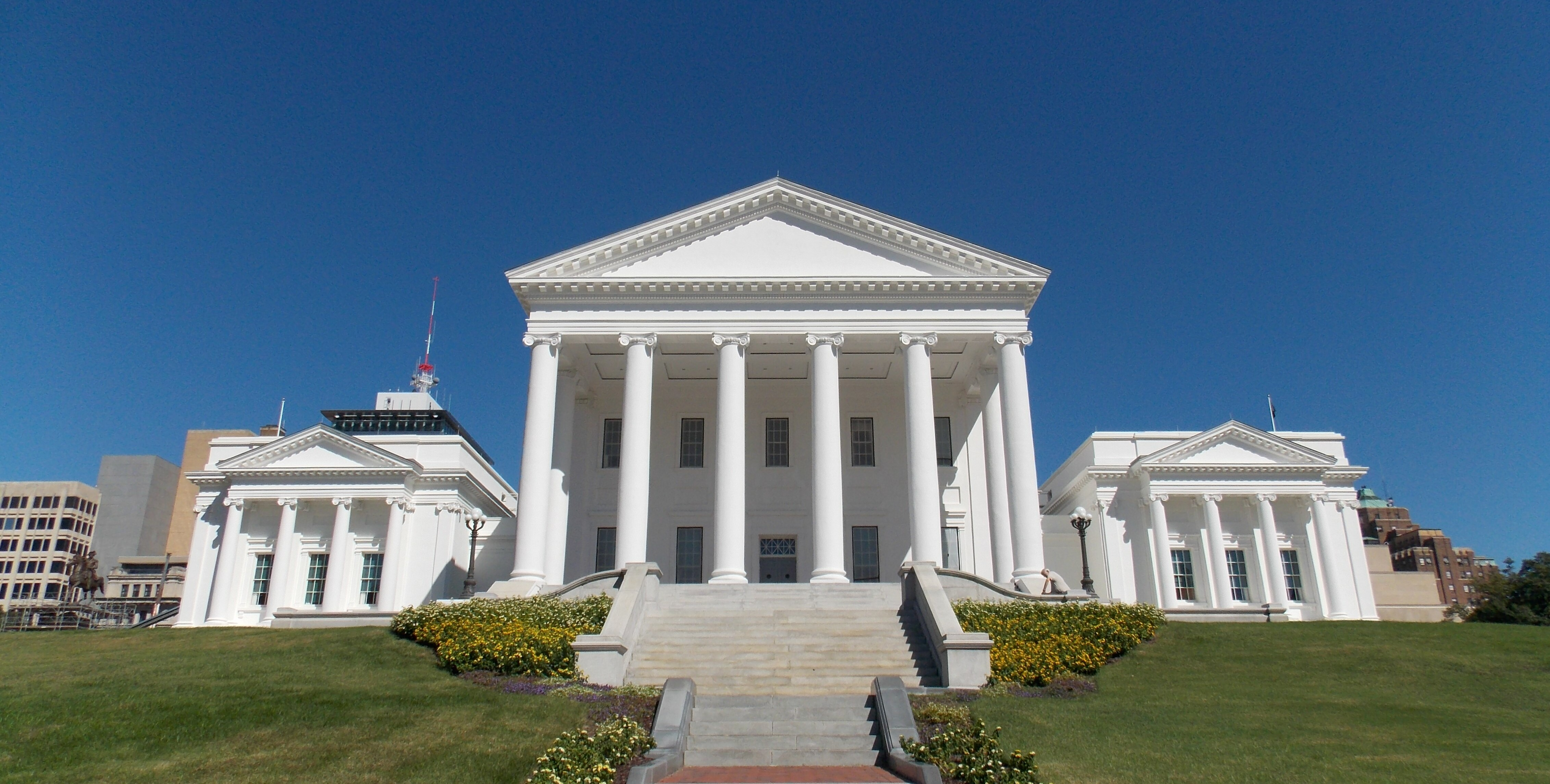

Overview
- Term: January 14, 2026 –

Senate of Virginia
- Members: 40
- President of the Senate: Lt. Gov. Ghazala Hashmi (D)
- Senate Majority Leader: Scott Surovell (D)
- Senate Minority Leader: Ryan McDougle (R)
- Party control: Democratic

Virginia House of Delegates
- Members: 100
- Speaker of the House: Don Scott (D)
- House Majority Leader: Charniele Herring (D)
- House Minority Leader: Terry Kilgore (R)
- Party control: Democratic

Sessions
- 1st: January 14, 2026 – March 14, 2026

Special sessions
- 1st: April 23, 2026

The 164th Virginia General Assembly, consisting of members who were elected to the Senate in 2023 and the House of Delegates in 2025, convened on January 14, 2026. Democrats retained a majority in the Virginia Senate and expanded their majority in the House of Delegates, with Democratic former State Senator Ghazala Hashmi becoming the next Lieutenant Governor. The 2023 Senate election was the first, and the 2025 House election was the second, to be held under maps for both houses of the Virginia General Assembly which were approved by the Virginia Redistricting Commission and the Supreme Court of Virginia in 2021, which were the first in Virginia history to not be drawn and approved by the legislature. The 2026 session began on January 14 and is set to adjourn on March 14, 2026. The 2024 special session that was called in the previous term of the Virginia General Assembly by Governor Glenn Youngkin briefly ran concurrently into the 2026 session until it was adjourned on January 15, 2026.

== Leadership and committees ==
The leadership structure remained largely unchanged from the previous assembly, with Democrats maintaining control of both chambers, by 21-19 in the Senate, and 64-36 in the House. In the House of Delegates, Don Scott was re-elected as Speaker on January 14, 2026. Committee assignments were updated at the start of the session, with key committees such as Appropriations, Finance, and Privileges and Elections reflecting Democratic priorities.

== Sessions ==
The regular session commenced on January 14, 2026, with key procedural resolutions adopted, including the schedule for bill introductions (deadline January 23, 2026) and crossover (February 17, 2026). At the end of the regular session, on March 14, 2026, 3,646 bills had been introduced, with committees actively hearing legislation ahead of the crossover deadline. Governor Abigail Spanberger delivered her first address to a joint session on January 19, emphasizing affordability, bipartisanship, and priorities such as healthcare costs, housing, and gun safety.

== Budget ==
Governor Spanberger presented her budget proposal on December 17, 2025, focusing on affordability measures, including investments in education, healthcare, and housing. Budget hearings were held on January 2, 2026. The House Appropriations and Senate Finance and Appropriations committees are scheduled to report their budget proposals on "Budget Sunday," February 22, 2026, with each chamber expected to act on its budget by February 26. As of February 12, 2026, January general fund revenues were ahead of forecast by 2.9 percent, providing additional resources amid debates over spending priorities. Controversies include Republican concerns over potential redirection of surpluses to partisan projects. After the regular session ended on March 14, 2026, without a budget bill passing, the General Assembly voted to convene for a special session on April 23, 2026, to continue negotiations. The special session failed to produce a final bill, and, as of June 11, 2026, lawmakers are faced with a June 30th deadline to finalize the state's budget. Negotiations remain stalled over several unresolved issues, including tax incentives for data centers. If the June 30th deadline passes, the state government will shut down, leading to uncertainty for agencies and local governments across Virginia.

== Legislation ==
The Democratic majorities advanced legislation aligned with campaign promises, including the "Affordable Virginia Agenda" focused on reducing costs in healthcare, housing, and energy. By February 9, 2026, more than half of these bills had passed either the House or Senate. Republicans criticized some measures as increasing taxes and burdens on the middle class.

=== Constitutional amendments ===
Constitutional amendments, under Virginia law, must be initiated by majorities in both houses in two consecutive legislatures before being sent to voters for approval. The following amendments, initiated in the previous General Assembly, were advanced:

HJ1 / SJ247 (initiated March 24, 2025): Constitutional amendment to guarantee a right to reproductive freedom, including abortion, contraception, and fertility treatments

HJ3 / SJ249 (initiated March 24, 2025): Constitutional amendment to codify same-sex and interracial marriage

HJ2 / SJ248 (initiated March 24, 2025): Constitutional amendment to automatically restore voting rights to formerly incarcerated individuals

HJ4 / HJ6007 (initiated October 31, 2025): Constitutional amendment to allow legislative mid-decade redistricting of congressional districts in response to mid-decade redistricting by other states

All four resolutions were passed by the House on January 14, 2026, and by the Senate on January 16, largely on party-line votes. Governor Spanberger signed the bills on February 6, placing HJ4 on the April 21, 2026 Special Election ballot and the others on 2026 General Election on November 3, 2026. Supporters argued the amendments protect essential rights, while opponents raised concerns over late-term abortions, human trafficking, parental consent, and potential gerrymandering in the redistricting measure.

=== Notable statutes ===
Key bills that passed include:

- HB 1: Incrementally increase the minimum wage to $15/hour by 2028.
- HB 20/SB 121: Removing the exemption that kept farm workers from receiving the state minimum wage.
- HB 217/SB 749: Prohibiting the future sail and manufacture of certain assault firearms and magazines holding more than 15 rounds.
- HB 675: Protected undocumented and immigrant workers from retaliation by employers if they report wage theft or minimum wage violations.
- SB 669: Cracks down on Prescription drug middlemen and establishes the Prescription Drug Affordability Board to limit costs for consumers.
- HB 26/SB 62: Establishes a resentencing and hearing process for individuals still incarcerated for past cannabis offenses that are no longer chargeable.
- HB 1441: Prohibits law-enforcement agencies from agreeing to assist federal immigration enforcement.
- HB 1524: Prohibits carrying assault firearms in public areas.

Bills that failed include:

- SB 199: Required mandatory sick leave for private employers. Vetoed by governor.
- SB 542: Would have established the regulatory framework to launch a retail marijuana market in Virginia. Vetoed by governor.

Bills on solar siting reform (HB 359/SB 5) and public sector unionization (HB 582) also progressed. A bill to regulate cryptocurrency kiosks passed both chambers.

=== Controversies ===
The redistricting amendment sparked debate over potential gerrymandering and suspension of anti-gerrymandering laws in the budget. Legislation on "claim sharks" targeting veterans drew criticism for empowering predatory companies. A bill (HB 359) requiring private religious schools to participate in state assessments and affirm gender identities raised religious freedom concerns. Data center pollution bills advanced amid environmental debates.

== See also ==
- Redistricting in Virginia
- Gun laws in Virginia
- Energy policy in Virginia
