= 163rd Virginia General Assembly =

←	162nd	164th	→
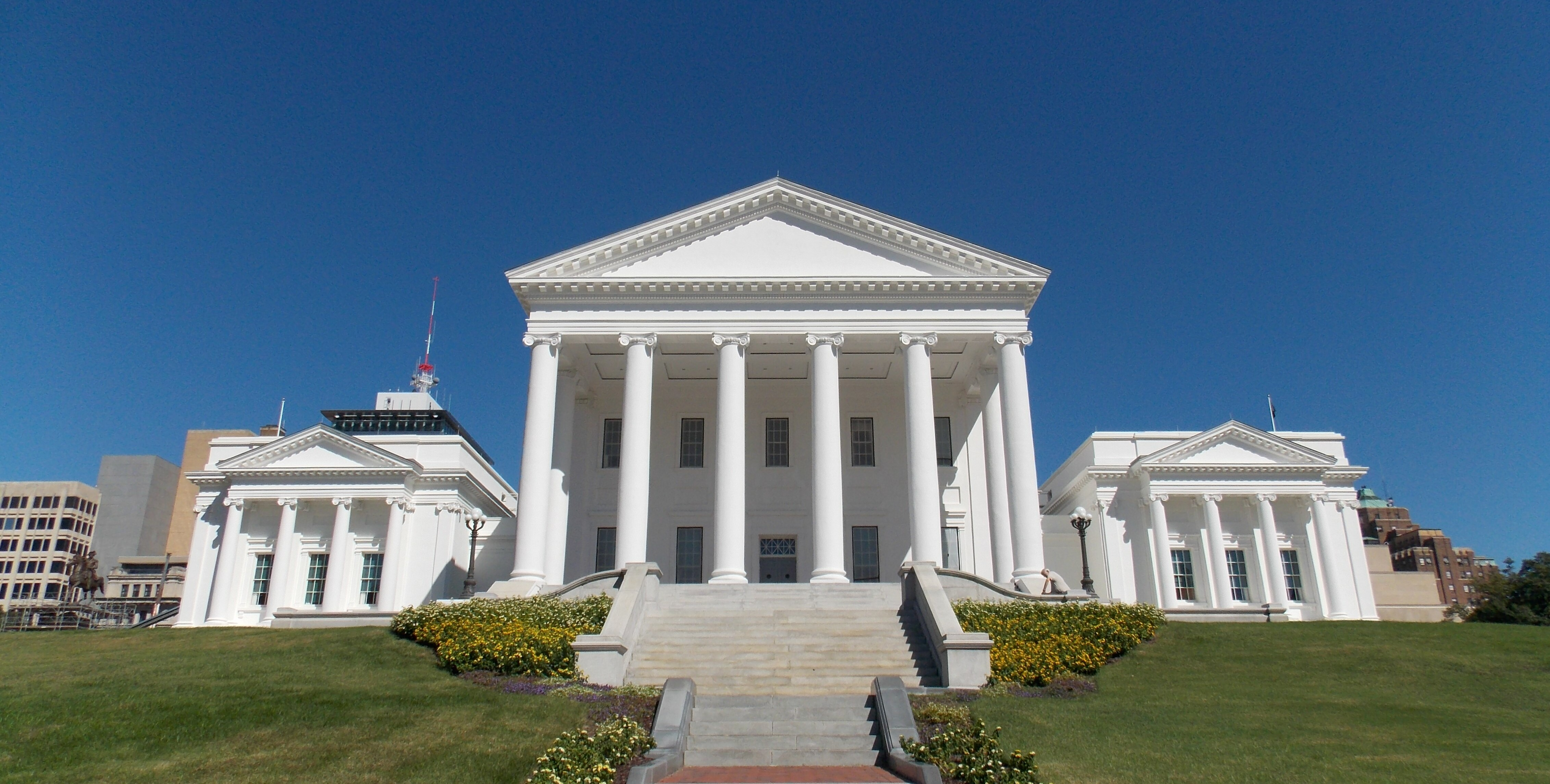

Overview
- Term: January 10, 2024 – January 14, 2026

Senate of Virginia
- Members: 40
- President of the Senate: Lt. Gov. Winsome Sears (R)
- Senate Majority Leader: Scott Surovell (D)
- Senate Minority Leader: Ryan McDougle (R)
- Party control: Democratic

Virginia House of Delegates
- Members: 100
- Speaker of the House: Don Scott (D)
- House Majority Leader: Charniele Herring (D)
- House Minority Leader: Todd Gilbert (R)
- Party control: Democratic

Sessions
- 1st: January 10, 2024 – March 9, 2024
- 2nd: January 8, 2025 – February 22, 2025

Special sessions
- 1st: May 13, 2024 – January 15, 2026

The 163rd Virginia General Assembly, consisting of members who were elected in both the House and Senate elections in 2023, convened on January 10, 2024. Both elections were the first to be held under maps for both houses of the Virginia General Assembly which were approved by the Virginia Redistricting Commission and the Supreme Court of Virginia in 2021, which were the first in Virginia history to not be drawn and approved by the legislature. Both elections resulted in Democrats winning majorities in both houses for the first time since 2021, with one-seat majorities in both chambers; it was the first time that Democrats won both houses of the legislature against an incumbent Republican governor since 1995.

The 2024 session convened from January 10 to March 9, 2024. Following adjournment of the 2024 regular session on February 22, Governor Glenn Youngkin called a special session for May 13 for both completion of the 2024-2026 biennial budget and amendments to the 2023-2024 budget. Over Youngkin's objection, Democrats in both houses refused to adjourn the special session following completion of the budget, allowing the special session to de jure continue indefinitely until it was adjourned in the next term of the Assembly on January 15, 2026. The special session ran concurrently through the 2025 session, which ran from January 8 to February 22, 2025. On October 23, 2025, Speaker Don Scott called the General Assembly back to continue the special session on October 28 for the purpose of initiating a constitutional amendment allowing for mid-decade legislative redistricting of congressional districts.

== Membership ==
=== Leadership ===
Delegate Don Scott, who was the minority leader of the House of Delegates in the previous General Assembly and won re-election, was nominated for speaker on November 11, 2023 by the incoming Democratic caucus. If voted into office, he would become the first House speaker of African descent in Virginia history, and the third person of African descent to preside over either house, after lieutenant governors Justin Fairfax and Winsome Sears in their roles as presidents of the State Senate. Charniele Herring was elected Majority Leader and Kathy Tran as Caucus Chair. Republicans elected former speaker Todd Gilbert as Minority Leader (defeating a challenge from Terry Kilgore), Amanda Batten as Caucus Chair, and Michael Webert as Whip.

In the Senate, due to the retirements of Democratic leader Dick Saslaw and Republican leader Tommy Norment, elections were held for leadership of both Senate caucuses.

On November 15, 2023, the Democrats elected Scott Surovell to Senate Majority Leader, with Mamie Locke being re-elected Caucus Chair. Republicans elected Ryan McDougle to serve as Minority Leader, Mark Obenshain to serve as Caucus Chair, and Bill Stanley and Bryce Reeves as Whips.

Chamber	Committee	Chair
Senate	Agriculture, Conservation, and Natural Resources	Dave Marsden
Senate	Commerce and Labor	Creigh Deeds
Senate	Education and Health	Ghazala Hashmi
Senate	Finance and Appropriations	Louise Lucas
Senate	General Laws and Technology	Adam Ebbin
Senate	Judiciary	Scott Surovell
Senate	Local Government	Jeremy McPike
Senate	Privileges and Elections	Aaron Rouse
Senate	Rehabilitation and Social Services	Barbara Favola
Senate	Rules	Mamie Locke
Senate	Transportation	Jennifer Boysko
House	Agriculture, Conservation, and Natural Resources	Alfonso Lopez
House	Appropriations	Luke Torian
House	Communications, Technology, and Innovation	Cliff Hayes, Jr.
House	Counties, Cities, and Towns	Candi King
House	Courts of Justice	Patrick Hope
House	Education	Sam Rasoul
House	Finance	Vivian Watts
House	General Laws	David Bulova
House	Health and Human Services	Mark Sickles
House	Labor and Commerce	Jeion Ward
House	Privileges and Elections	Marcia Price
House	Public Safety	Marcus Simon
House	Rules	Don Scott
House	Transportation	Karrie Delaney

== Legislation ==
Intended legislation of the Democratic majorities include:

- Constitutional amendment to guarantee a right to abortion
- Constitutional amendment to legalize same-sex marriage
- Constitutional amendment to automatically restore voting rights to formerly-incarcerated individuals
- Constitutional amendment to allow legislative redistricting of congressional districts in response to mid-decade redistricting by other states.

Constitutional amendments, under Virginia law, must be initiated by majorities in both houses in two consecutive legislatures before being sent to voters for approval.

== Special elections ==
- Tammy Brankley Mulchi (R, 9th senate district): January 2024, to succeed Frank Ruff
