= Destiny LeVere Bolling =

American politician

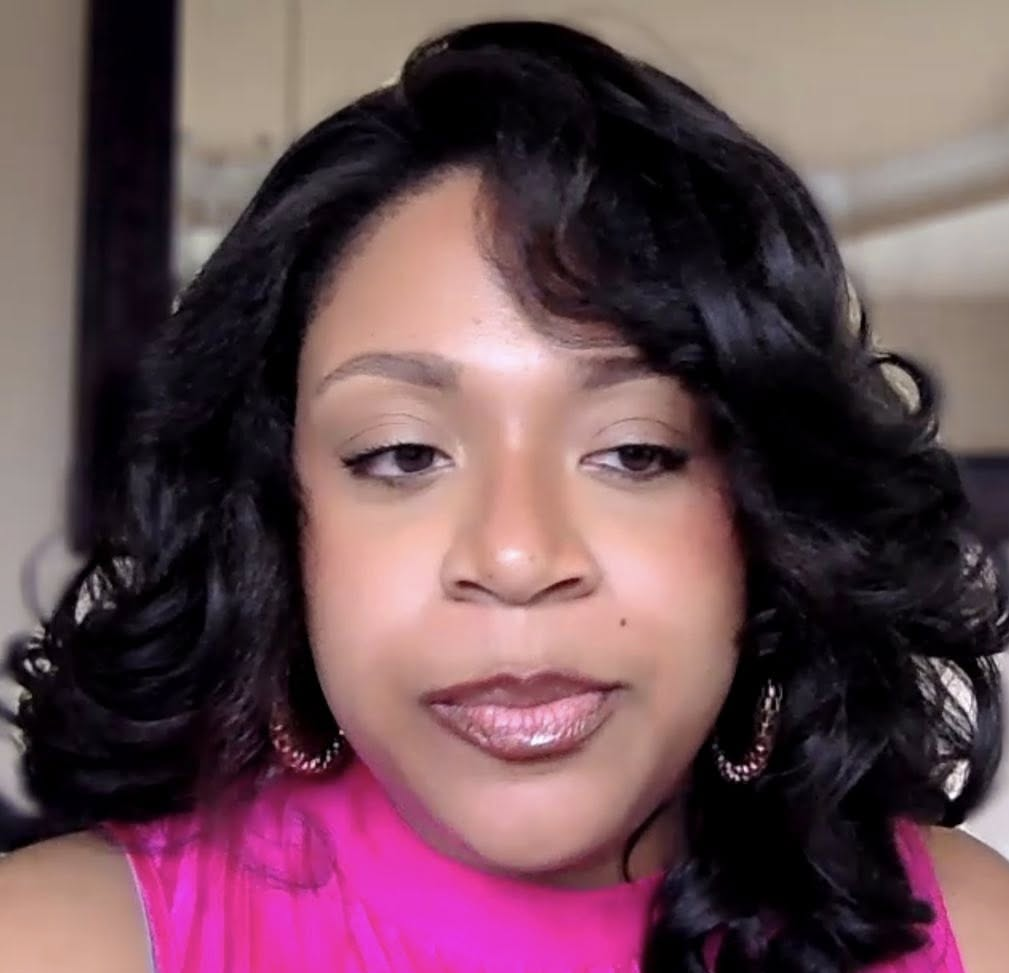
- Bolling in 2025

Member of the Virginia House of Delegates from the 80th district
- Incumbent
- Assumed office January 10, 2024
- Preceded by: Don Scott (redistricting)

Personal details
- Party: Democratic

Destiny LeVere Bolling is an American Democratic politician from Virginia. She was elected to the Virginia House of Delegates in the 2023 Virginia House of Delegates election from the 80th district.

She is a union leader.

In 2025, a few days after giving birth to a baby girl, she became the first woman in the state of Virginia allowed to vote remotely, and the first legislator allowed to do so because of childbirth.
