= Ken Melvin =

Ken Melvin may refer to:

- Kenneth R. Melvin (born 1952), American politician, lawyer and jurist
- Ken Melvin (The Bill), a fictional character on British serial drama The Bill
