= Virginia's 15th House of Delegates district =

Virginia legislative district

Virginia's 15th State House of Delegates district
- District map from the 2023 election
Delegate
Laura Jane Cohen; D–Fairfax County
- Demographics: 56% White; 7% Black; 14% Hispanic; 16% Asian; 0% Native American; 0% Hawaiian/Pacific Islander; 1% Other; 6% Multiracial
- Population (2024) • Voting age: 88,931; 18
- Registered voters: 66,746

Virginia's 15th House of Delegates district elects one of 100 seats in the Virginia House of Delegates, the lower house of the state's bicameral legislature. District 15 represents parts of Fairfax County. The seat is currently held by Democrat Laura Jane Cohen.

== District officeholders ==
Years	Delegate	Party	Electoral history
1983 – 1992	G. Steven Agee	Republican	
1992 – 2000	Raymond R. "Andy" Guest, Jr	Republican	
2000 – January 11, 2006	Allen Louderback	Republican	Retired
January 11, 2006 – January 10, 2024	Todd Gilbert	Republican	Majority Leader of the Virginia House of Delegates (2018-2020); Speaker of the Virginia House of Delegates (2022-2024); Minority Leader of the Virginia House of Delegates (2024-present); First elected in 2017; Redistricted to the 33rd District
January 10, 2024 – present	Laura Jane Cohen	Democratic	First elected in 2023

== Electoral history ==
Date	Election	Candidate	Party	Votes	%
Virginia House of Delegates, 15th district
Nov 6, 2001	General	A. L. Louderback	Republican	12,429	63.0
Nov 6, 2001	General	B. G. Pollack	Independent	7,242	36.7
Nov 6, 2001	General	Write Ins		67	0.3
Nov 4, 2003	General	A. L. Louderback	Republican	12,494	63.1
Nov 4, 2003	General	T. A. Lewis	Democratic	7,277	36.8
Nov 4, 2003	General	Write Ins		26	0.1
Nov 8, 2005	General	C T Gilbert	Republican	14,050	64.46
Nov 8, 2005	General	J K Blubaugh	Democratic	7,721	35.42
Nov 8, 2005	General	Write Ins		26	0.12
Nov 8, 2005	General	Allen Louderback retired; seat stayed Republican			
Nov 6, 2007	General	C. Todd Gilbert	Republican	15,156	98.05
Nov 6, 2007	General	Write Ins		301	1.94
Nov 3, 2009	General	C. Todd Gilbert	Republican	16,168	69.26
Nov 3, 2009	General	John D. Lesinski	Democratic	7,155	30.65
Nov 3, 2009	General	Write Ins		19	0.08
Nov 8, 2011	General	C. Todd Gilbert	Republican	13,617	97.85
Nov 8, 2011	General	Write Ins		299	2.14
Jun 11, 2013	Republican primary	C. Todd Gilbert		3,661	92.10
Jun 11, 2013	Republican primary	Mark W. Prince		314	7.90
Nov 5, 2013	General	Christopher Todd Gilbert	Republican	17,376	96.6
Nov 5, 2013	General	Write Ins		615	3.4
Nov 3, 2015	General	Christopher Todd Gilbert	Republican	16,102	97.9
Nov 3, 2015	General	Write Ins		350	2.1
Nov 7, 2017	General	Christopher Todd Gilbert	Republican	19,284	94.3
Nov 7, 2017	General	Write Ins		1,171	5.7
Nov 5, 2019	General	Christopher Todd Gilbert	Republican	18,914	74.4
Nov 5, 2019	General	Beverly Harrison	Democratic	6,493	25.5
Nov 5, 2019	General	Write Ins		31	0.1
Nov 2, 2021	General	Christopher Todd Gilbert	Republican	26,613	77.7
Nov 2, 2021	General	Emily Garnett Scott	Democratic	7,601	22.2
Nov 2, 2021	General	Write Ins		41	0.1
Nov 7, 2023	General	Laura Jane H. Cohen	Democratic	19,394	61.9
Nov 7, 2023	General	Marcus T. Evans	Republican	11,880	37.9
Nov 7, 2023	General	Write Ins		81	0.3
