= Laura Jane Cohen =

American politician from Virginia

Member of the Virginia House of Delegates from the 15th district
- Incumbent
- Assumed office January 10, 2024
- Preceded by: Todd Gilbert (redistricting)

Personal details
- Party: Democratic

Laura Jane H. Cohen is an American educator and Democratic politician from Virginia. She was elected to serve the 15th district in the Virginia House of Delegates in the 2023 Virginia House of Delegates election.

== Early life and education ==
Laura Jane Cohen was raised in Marietta, Georgia and is the daughter and granddaughter of public school teachers. She attended the University of Georgia and received a Bachelor's degree in political science.

== Career ==
Laura Jane Cohen was a public school teacher for over two decades before seeking elected office. She also was a member of her local PTA.

In 2019 Laura Jane Cohen ran for Springfield District School Board Member and won the election. She was sworn into office and served from 2020 until 2023, when she ran for the 15th District in the Virginia House of Delegates.

Cohen ran for Delegate in the newly created 15th House District following redistricting in 2023 defeating Republican Marcus Evans by over 61%. Cohen faced Saundra Davis in the 2025 Virginia House of Delegates election and was re-elected.

== Personal life ==
Cohen moved to Fairfax County, VA with her husband in 2001. She resides in Fairfax County with her two children.

Cohen is bisexual. She is Jewish.
