= Joe T. May =

American politician (born 1937)

Joe May

Member of the Virginia House of Delegates from the 33rd district
- In office January 12, 1994 – January 8, 2014
- Preceded by: Linda M. Wallace
- Succeeded by: Dave LaRock

Personal details
- Born: Joseph Turner May; June 8, 1937 (age 89) Broadway, Virginia, U.S.
- Party: Republican
- Spouse: Roberta Compton Downs
- Children: 3
- Education: Virginia Tech
- Profession: Electrical engineer

Military service
- Allegiance: United States
- Branch/service: United States Army
- Years of service: 1955–1958
- Rank: Sergeant
- Unit: 89th Ordnance Detachment

Joe Turner May (born June 8, 1937) is an American businessman, electrical engineer, inventor, aviator, and politician.

== Biography ==
Born on June 8, 1937, in Broadway, Virginia, May graduated from Virginia Tech in 1959. Between 1955–1958, he served in the United States Army.

In 1977, May founded EIT, a Sterling-based electronics manufacturer. May holds more than 20 patents in the fields of electrical and electronic engineering. He is also an avid aviator, holding licenses in both fixed and rotary wing aircraft.

Between 1994 and 2014, he served in the Virginia House of Delegates, representing the 33rd district. The district included parts of Clarke, Frederick and Loudoun counties. May, a self described moderate, was a member of the Republican Party caucus. During his time in the House of Delegates, May was co-chair of the Science and Technology committee between 1998–2001, and chair between 2002–2007. From 2008–2014, he was chair of the committee on Transportation.

In June 2013, Dave LaRock defeated May in the 33rd district Republican primary.

In December 2013, May announced his candidacy in a special election to succeed Democratic Attorney General-elect Mark Herring, in the Virginia State Senate. After the Republican Party decided to choose its candidate through a "mass meeting" instead of a primary, May declared he would run as an independent. May was endorsed by both the conservative-leaning National Federation of Independent Business and the centralist Independent Greens Party. On election day, May garnered 10% of the vote, while the Democratic and Republican candidates received 53% and 38%, respectively.

May was the Republican candidate in the January 8, 2019, special election for the 33rd district to the Virginia Senate, losing to Democrat Jennifer Boysko, following Jennifer Wexton's election to the U.S. House of Representatives.

May and his wife, Roberta Compton Downs, reside in Leesburg, Virginia.

== Electoral history ==
Date	Election	Candidate	Party	Votes	%
Virginia House of Delegates, 33rd district
November 2, 1993	General	Joe T. May	Republican	9,773	51.9%
November 2, 1993	General	Jean S. Brown	Democratic	8,736	46.4%
November 2, 1993	General	Christina Nelson Huth	Independent	323	1.7%
November 2, 1993	General	Linda M. Wallace retired; seat stayed Republican			
November 7, 1995	General	Joe T. May	Republican	10,090	61.7%
November 7, 1995	General	Richard D. Winter	Democratic	6,239	37.4%
November 7, 1995	General	Write-ins		4	0.02%
November 4, 1997	General	Joe T. May	Republican	11,976	59.6%
November 4, 1997	General	Kenneth P. Halla	Democratic	6,563	32.7%
November 4, 1997	General	Robert E. Primack	Independent Greens	1,536	7.7%
November 4, 1997	General	Write-ins		15	0.1%
November 2, 1999	General	Joe T. May	Republican	14,095	98.8%
November 2, 1999	General	Write-ins		167	1.2%
Nov 6, 2001	General	Joe T. May	Republican	17,107	98.1%
Nov 6, 2001	General	Write-ins		328	1.9%
Nov 4, 2003	General	Joe T. May	Republican	16,031	98.1%
Nov 4, 2003	General	Write-ins		311	1.9%
Jun 14, 2005	Republican primary	Joy T. May		2,974	59.8%
Jun 14, 2005	Republican primary	Christopher G. Oprison		1,999	40.2%
November 8, 2005	General	Joe T. May	Republican	20,621	91.8%
November 8, 2005	General	Write-ins		1,847	8.2%
November 6, 2007	General	Joe T. May	Republican	14,978	59.8%
November 6, 2007	General	Marty Martinez	Democratic	10,029	40.1%
November 6, 2007	General	Write-ins		35	0.1%
November 3, 2009	General	Joe T. May	Republican	22,489	96.9%
November 3, 2009	General	Write-ins		722	3.1%
November 8, 2011	General	Joe T. May	Republican	13,027	97.4%
November 8, 2011	General	Write-ins		346	2.6%
June 4, 2013	Republican primary	Dave LaRock		2,958	57.3%
June 4, 2013	Republican primary	Joe T. May		2,201	42.7%
Virginia State Senate, 33rd district
January 21, 2014	Special election	Jennifer Wexton	Democratic	11,427	52.7%
January 21, 2014	Special election	John Whitbeck	Republican	8,128	37.5%
January 21, 2014	Special election	Joe T. May	Independent	2,119	9.8%
January 21, 2014	Special election	Write-ins		3	0.01%
January 8, 2019	Special election	Jennifer Boysko	Democratic	14,127	69.5%
January 8, 2019	Special election	Joe T. May	Republican	6,183	30.4%
January 8, 2019	Special election	Write-ins		27	0.01%
