= Virginia's 80th House of Delegates district =

Virginia legislative district

District map from the 2023 election

Virginia's 80th House of Delegates district elects one of 100 seats in the Virginia House of Delegates, the lower house of the state's bicameral legislature. Located in the Richmond metro of Virginia, District 80 represents parts of Henrico County. The seat is currently held by Democrat Destiny LeVere Bolling.

== District officeholders ==
| Years | Delegate | Party | Electoral history |
|---|---|---|---|
| January 12, 1983 – January 8, 1986 | L. Cleaves Manning | Democratic | Lost primary challenge |
| January 8, 1986 – May 1, 2009 | Kenneth R. Melvin | Democratic | Resigned after announcing retirement |
| January 13, 2010 – January 8, 2020 | Matthew James | Democratic | Resigned after appointed to an executive position by Governor Ralph Northam |
| January 8, 2020 – January 10, 2024 | Don Scott | Democratic | First elected in 2019. Redistricted for 2023 cycle |
| January 10, 2024 – present | Destiny LeVere Bolling | Democratic | First elected in 2023 |
