= Matthew James (politician) =

American politician (born 1955)

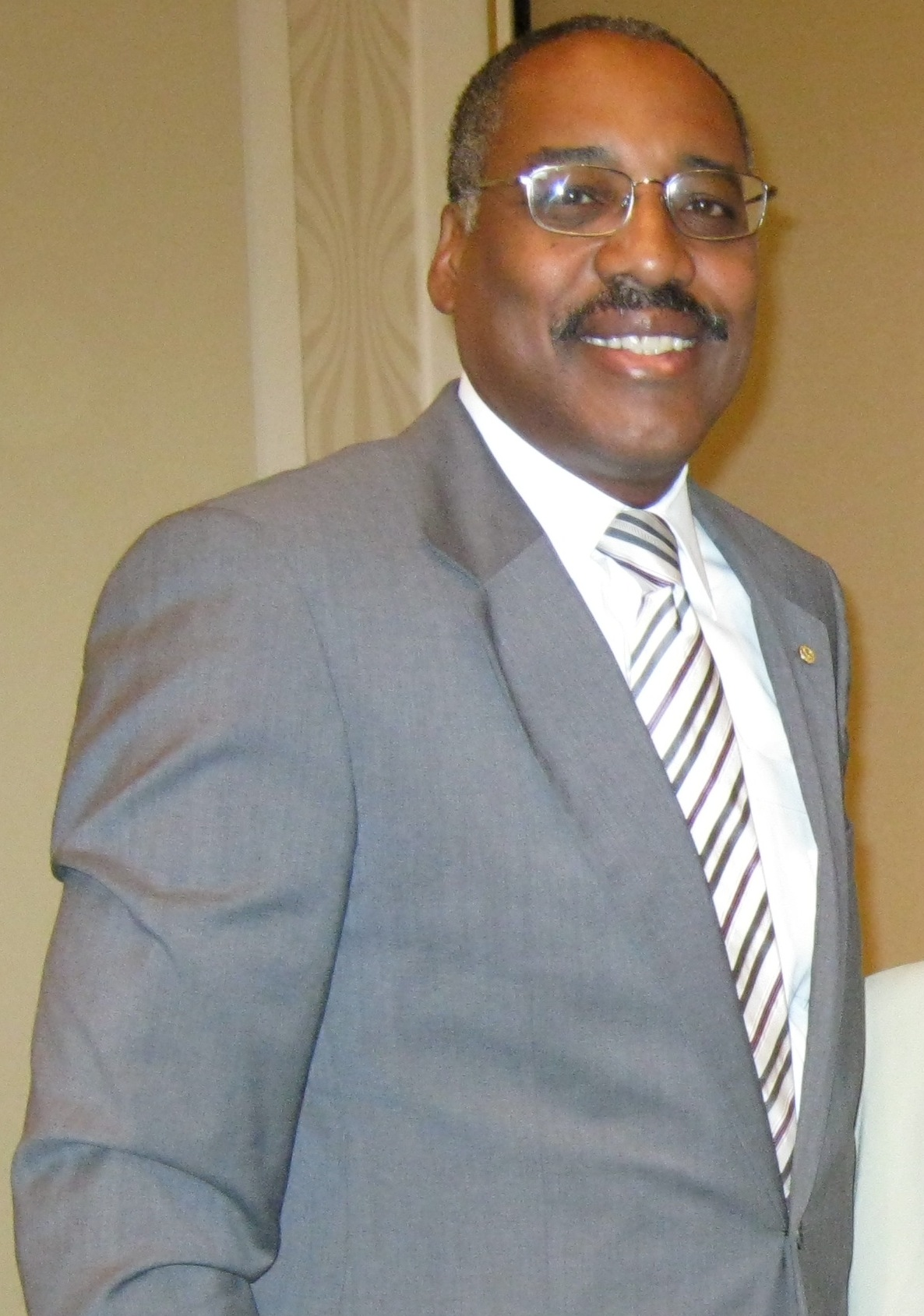

Member of the Virginia House of Delegates from the 80th district
- In office January 13, 2010 – January 8, 2020
- Preceded by: Kenneth R. Melvin
- Succeeded by: Don Scott

Personal details
- Born: September 11, 1955 (age 71) Norfolk, Virginia, U.S.
- Party: Democratic
- Spouse: Karen Scott
- Education: Hampton University, Northwestern University
- Profession: Chief Executive Officer
- Committees: Agriculture Chesapeake and Natural Resources, General Laws, Militia Police and Public Safety

Matthew James (born September 11, 1955 in Norfolk, Virginia) is a former Democratic member of the Virginia House of Delegates from the 80th district, comprising parts of the cities Norfolk, Portsmouth, and Chesapeake.

He won his seat in the 2009 election after defeating Republican Jennifer Lee in the general election by nearly forty points. He succeeded incumbent Kenneth Melvin, who resigned in May 2009 to become a judge.
