= Redistricting in Virginia =

Changes to representative apportionment in the Commonwealth

Redistricting has been a controversial topic in Virginia due to allegations of gerrymandering.

== Congressional districts ==
The Republican Party lost one of its seats in Congress when a federal court redrew Virginia's 4th congressional district. A suit claimed the district had been racially gerrymandered to give an advantage to white Republicans. The ruling in that case found that the General Assembly in 2012 unconstitutionally packed too many black voters into Bobby Scott's district, weakening the clout of blacks in nearby districts. This ruling allowed Democrat Donald McEachin to represent the 4th District in the newly convened U.S. House of Representatives.

== House of Delegates districts ==
Delegate Mark L. Cole noted that even without gerrymandering, political polarization will exist because of the stark political differences between urban and rural areas, which makes drawing competitive districts impossible in some regions of the state.

On March 1, 2017, the U.S. Supreme Court sent a case involving 12 Virginia House of Delegates districts back to a lower court to rule on 11 of those districts. Richmond Circuit Court Judge W. Reilly Marchant ruled that the constitutionality of the map was "fairly debatable" and therefore upheld it. In June 2018, the U.S. District Court for the Eastern District of Virginia found that the 11 districts unconstitutionally concentrated black voters, depriving them of representation. The Court gave the Virginia legislature until October 30, 2018, to submit a new map, but the Republican-majority Assembly was unable to agree on a map that would also be supported by Democratic Governor Ralph Northam, and the Court instead appointed University of California, Irvine political science professor Bernard Grofman to serve as special master to oversee the redistricting process.

== Proposed reforms ==
The Redistricting Coalition of Virginia proposed either an independent commission or a bipartisan commission that is not polarized. Member organizations include the League of Women Voters of Virginia, AARP of Virginia, OneVirginia2021, the Virginia Chamber of Commerce and the Virginia Organizing Project. Governor Bob McDonnell's Independent Bipartisan Advisory Commission on Redistricting for the Commonwealth of Virginia made its report on April 1, 2011. It made two recommendations for each state legislative house that showed maps of districts more compact and contiguous than those adopted by the General Assembly.

In 2011, the Virginia College and University Redistricting Competition was organized by Professors Michael McDonald of George Mason University and Quentin Kidd of Christopher Newport University. About 150 students on sixteen teams from thirteen schools submitted plans for legislative and U.S. congressional districts. They created districts more compact than the General Assembly's efforts. The "Division 1" maps conformed with the Governor's Executive Order, and did not address electoral competition or representational fairness. In addition to the criteria of contiguity, equipopulation, the federal Voting Rights Act and communities of interest in the existing city and county boundaries, "Division 2" maps in the competition did incorporate considerations of electoral competition and representational fairness. Judges for the cash award prizes were Thomas Mann of the Brookings Institution and Norman Ornstein of the American Enterprise Institute.

In January 2015, Republican State Senator Jill Holtzman Vogel of Winchester and Democratic State Senator Louise Lucas of Portsmouth sponsored a Senate Joint Resolution to establish additional criteria for the Virginia Redistricting Commission of four identified members of political parties, and three other independent public officials. The criteria began with respecting existing political boundaries, such as cities and towns, counties and magisterial districts, election districts and voting precincts. Districts are to be established on the basis of population, in conformance with federal and state laws and court cases, including those addressing racial fairness. The territory is to be contiguous and compact, without oddly shaped boundaries. The commission is prohibited from using political data or election results to favor either political party or incumbent. It passed with a two-thirds majority of 27 to 12 in the Senate, and was then referred to committee in the House of Delegates.

In 2015, at Vesilind v. Virginia State Board of Elections in a Virginia state court, plaintiffs sought to overturn the General Assembly's redistricting in five House of Delegate and six state Senate districts as violations of both the Virginia and U.S. Constitutions because they failed to represent populations in "continuous and compact territory".

In the 2017 Virginia General Assembly, all of the redistricting reform bills were killed.

== Virginia Redistricting Commission ==
The Virginia General Assembly passed HJ 615 in 2019 and SJ 18 in 2020 to amend the state constitution to form a redistricting commission for the 2021 redistricting process. In accordance with Virginia's process for amending the state constitution, this proposed amendment had to pass through the General Assembly in two successive legislatures before being passed on to Virginia voters, who voted on this referendum in November 2020. The amendment created a sixteen-member commission, composed of eight citizens, two Senate Democrats, two Senate Republicans, two House Democrats, and two House Republicans, to redistrict Virginia, instead of the General Assembly. It also cements requirements for commission transparency and historic civil rights protections for racial and ethnic minorities in the Virginia Constitution. If the commission cannot agree or if the General Assembly rejects the commission's map twice, the Virginia Supreme Court will redraw the districts in accordance with existing standards, likely with the help of a Special Master. The amendment passed with 65.69% of the vote on November 3, 2020.

For the first cycle following the 2020 Census, the commission failed to agree on maps for the new districts, so in accordance with the Virginia Constitution, the Supreme Court took over responsibility from the group and completed the redistricting process in December 2021 with the help of two court-appointed special masters.

== 2026 redistricting amendment ==
Virginia's congressional districts in effect since the 2022 elections Interactive map version

Virginia's congressional districts as proposed by the Virginia General Assembly for the 2026 redistricting amendment Interactive map version

The 2026 Virginia redistricting referendum appeared on the April 21, 2026, ballot in the state of Virginia as a legislatively referred constitutional amendment. The amendment passed by a slim margin, but it was subsequently struck down by the Supreme Court of Virginia. As such, the power to draw the state's congressional districts was retained by a bipartisan commission, and was not given back to the state legislature, as the amendment had intended to do. The amendment, mostly favored by Democrats and opposed by Republicans, is part of a larger, nationwide gerrymandering battle. It was first considered by Virginia lawmakers in October 2025, and was given preliminary approval on October 31. The Virginia General Assembly passed the amendment a second time on January 16, 2026.

On January 27, 2026, a Virginia judge ruled the amendment to be unlawful, blocking it from appearing on the April ballot. However, Virginia Democrats appealed the decision, and on February 13, the Virginia Supreme Court allowed the referendum to proceed as scheduled. On February 19, following the Virginia Supreme Court ruling, a Virginia judge ruled the amendment to be unlawful on grounds unrelated to the original ruling and unrelated to the ruling of the Virginia Supreme Court, once again blocking the proposed amendment from appearing on the April ballot. On March 2, a court ruled that the election can still take place and legal battles will be resolved after the election. Early voting began on March 6, 2026, and ended on April 18, 2026.

As voters approved the referendum, a new map already passed by the General Assembly would have been used for the 2026 elections, as well as in 2028 and 2030, had the amendment survived a legal challenge before the Virginia Supreme Court. The map was gerrymandered to favor Democrats in 10 out of 11 congressional districts, which would have represented a gain of four seats for the Democratic party.

On April 22, a Virginia judge issued an injunction against the certification and implementation of the results; Attorney General Jay Jones sought a stay from the Supreme Court of Virginia. On April 28, the Supreme Court of Virginia denied the stay, leaving the lower court's injunction in place, until the constitutionality of the proposal was adjudicated. The Supreme Court struck down the amendment on May 8, 2026.

Following the ruling, Virginia House Speaker Don Scott and Attorney General Jay Jones filed an emergency appeal to the US Supreme Court and filed a motion requesting the state Supreme Court to pause its ruling from taking effect while the appeal plays out. The appeal was rejected by the U.S. Supreme Court on May 15.

== See also ==
- Elections in Virginia
- 2020 United States census
- 2020 United States redistricting cycle
