= Dave LaRock =

American politician (born 1956)

Member of the Virginia House of Delegates from the 33rd district
- In office January 8, 2014 – January 10, 2024
- Preceded by: Joe T. May
- Succeeded by: Todd Gilbert (redistricted)

Personal details
- Born: David Alfred LaRock; May 30, 1956 (age 70) Oswego, New York, U.S.
- Party: Republican
- Spouse: Joanne Gilbert
- Education: State University of New York, Canton (attended)
- Website: Campaign website

Dave Alfred LaRock (born May 30, 1956) is an American politician who served from 2014 to 2024 as the Virginia state delegate for the 33rd district. He is a member of the Republican Party. LaRock ran for the Republican nomination in the 2025 Virginia gubernatorial election, failing to qualify for the primary ballot.

== Political career ==
LaRock defeated incumbent Delegate Joe T. May in the June 11, 2013, Republican primary. He then defeated Democrat Mary L. Costello Daniel and Libertarian Patrick Hagerty in the November 5, 2013, general election. He was reelected on November 3, 2015, defeating Democrat Chuck Hedges and Libertarian Mark Anderson, winning 60% of the vote, including every precinct in the district. In 2017, he was again reelected, defeating Democrat Tia Walbridge 55%-45%. He again won reelection in 2019, 57%-43% over Mavis Taintor, and in 2021, 58%-42% over Paul Siker.

Following the 2020 census and legislative redistricting, LaRock announced that he would run in 2023 to serve in the Virginia Senate's new 1st District, an open seat. He moved his legal residence from Hamilton, Virginia, to Berryville, Virginia, in order to be within the district boundaries. Seven other citizens and local elected officials including James Bergida, a conservative Christendom College professor, Lance Allen, a candidate for lieutenant governor in 2021, Timmy French, a farmer, John Massoud, a former House of Delegates candidate, and several others also ran in the Republican Primary, which was held on June 20, 2023. LaRock came in second behind French, who became the Republican nominee in the general election. After losing the primary, LaRock launched a write-in campaign for the seat, describing French as "a Democrat." Ultimately, LaRock came in a distant third behind French and Democratic nominee Emily Scott.

=== 2025 gubernatorial election ===
On February 19, 2025, LaRock said he was considering a bid for governor. On February 27, LaRock announced his candidacy for the Republican nomination. His campaign supported President Donald Trump and Elon Musk's Department of Government Efficiency initiative to be implemented on the statewide level. LaRock criticized Winsome Earle-Sears—a candidate who was previously unopposed in the primary—for not being "sufficiently loyal to President Donald Trump".

LaRock failed to secure 10,000 signatures to qualify for the primary ballot by April 5. LaRock criticized Governor Glenn Youngkin's endorsement of Earle-Sears for his inability to win enough signatures to be on the ballot. LaRock said, "The current Governor jumping in early to designate his successor did not make it easy for us to give the Republican voters a real choice in the primary — but we came close."

== Political positions ==
LaRock's legislative efforts have focused on transportation, educational choice, anti-abortion advocacy, religious liberty, and Second Amendment issues. LaRock opposed efforts in Virginia to provide employment and housing protections to LGBT people, saying that the state should not provide special rights or protections for "chosen sexual habits." In another 2018 interview, LaRock said he would find it "very disturbing" if a transgender person was able to teach a kindergarten class, believing that transgender people have a mental disorder and that they should not be put into "role-model positions" in schools.

=== 2020–21 United States election protests ===
LaRock was one of three GOP delegates in Virginia that sent a letter to Vice President Pence asking him to postpone the final counting of electoral votes, which gave Joe Biden the win including Virginia's 13 electoral votes. The letter included two co-signers, Del. Mark Cole (R-Fauquier) and Del. Ronnie Campbell (R-Lexington), requesting "a stay of any designation of Presidential Electors from our state until such time as a comprehensive forensic audit of the November 3, 2020, election has taken place to determine the actual winner."

In the months after the 2020 Election, LaRock encouraged attendance at various freedom rallies, including one in Washington, D.C., on January 6, and raised concerns about the 2020 presidential election.

==== January 6, 2021 ====
LaRock participated in the rally at the White House Ellipse and another "Freedom Rally" on January 6, 2021, calling the protest "an outstanding exercise of the right of the people peaceably to assemble, and to petition the government for a redress of grievances. There was no vandalism, trash was picked up, and many times the masses sang the National Anthem together."

He condemned the violence, but posted on social media that the Trump-supporting mob had been infiltrated by "paid provocateurs," and that there was credible doubt around the validity of Joe Biden’s victory in the 2020 presidential election. Days later, LaRock said, "I think some antifa people were there. It also seems clear that there were people there who were Trump supporters but were behaving in a manner that is unbecoming to the great majority of people who support Donald Trump."

LaRock faced calls to resign from the Loudoun NAACP, Winchester Area NAACP, fellow lawmakers, and at least two Loudoun County county supervisors. On January 12, 2021, Virginia House Speaker Eileen Filler-Corn (D) stripped LaRock and the two other Republican delegates—Mark Cole and Ronnie Campbell—of one committee assignment each.

==== Support for constituent charged with criminal conspiracy ====
LaRock expressed his support for his constituent Thomas Caldwell, who was charged with conspiracy for his role in allegedly conspiring to forcibly storm the U.S. Capitol. Prior to learning of Caldwell's arrest, LaRock said, "Tom is a wonderful man. He and Sharon have been very supportive of me. Tom has served our country in a long and distinguished career in the U.S. military. I think very highly of Tom and Sharon."

== Personal life ==
LaRock is a general contractor, and resides in Berryville, Virginia, with his wife Joanne and the youngest of their seven children.

=== Trespassing ===
A complaint was filed against David LaRock in Loudoun County General District Court on four misdemeanor charges, including trespassing and destroying a posted sign. The offenses occurred between September 8, 2020, and October 12, 2020, on an easement held by LaRock in Hamilton, Virginia. A no trespass order was provided on September 4, 2020, according to the complaint. The charges for trespassing and destroying a posted sign were dismissed by the trial judge, who found LaRock guilty on two counts of pulling down a fence. LaRock was ordered to pay a $25 fine for each conviction. The "pulling down a fence" charges against LaRock were dismissed on March 29, 2022, when Judge Daniel R. Bouton said "This is simply not a criminal case." LaRock said that the charges were "...a drawn-out and expensive attack on me personally and as an elected office holder," LaRock said in a prepared statement. "Judge Daniel R. Bouton dropped the last of four charges brought against me by Buta Biberaj. I'm grateful to Judge Bouton and my attorney Caleb Kershner."

Over the weekend of July 30–31, 2022, LaRock was again accused of damaging that same neighbor's property on LaRock's easement.

LaRock had previously been charged with trespassing and destruction of property in 2012 related to an illegal sign.

=== Social media language ===
LaRock drew condemnations on social media and from local officials for use of the term "colored" in a January 2021 letter on his campaign website. In the letter, LaRock said of Loudoun Supervisors and NAACP leaders that "rather than focusing on the business of Loudoun County and the needs of the colored community, they are wasting their time and taxpayer resources to attack me." The letter was updated immediately to replace "colored" with minorities. LaRock said he did not realize that using "colored people" was racist until after he issued the statement.
