= Jason Redman =

Retired US Navy officer, author, and nonprofit organizer

Jason C. Redman
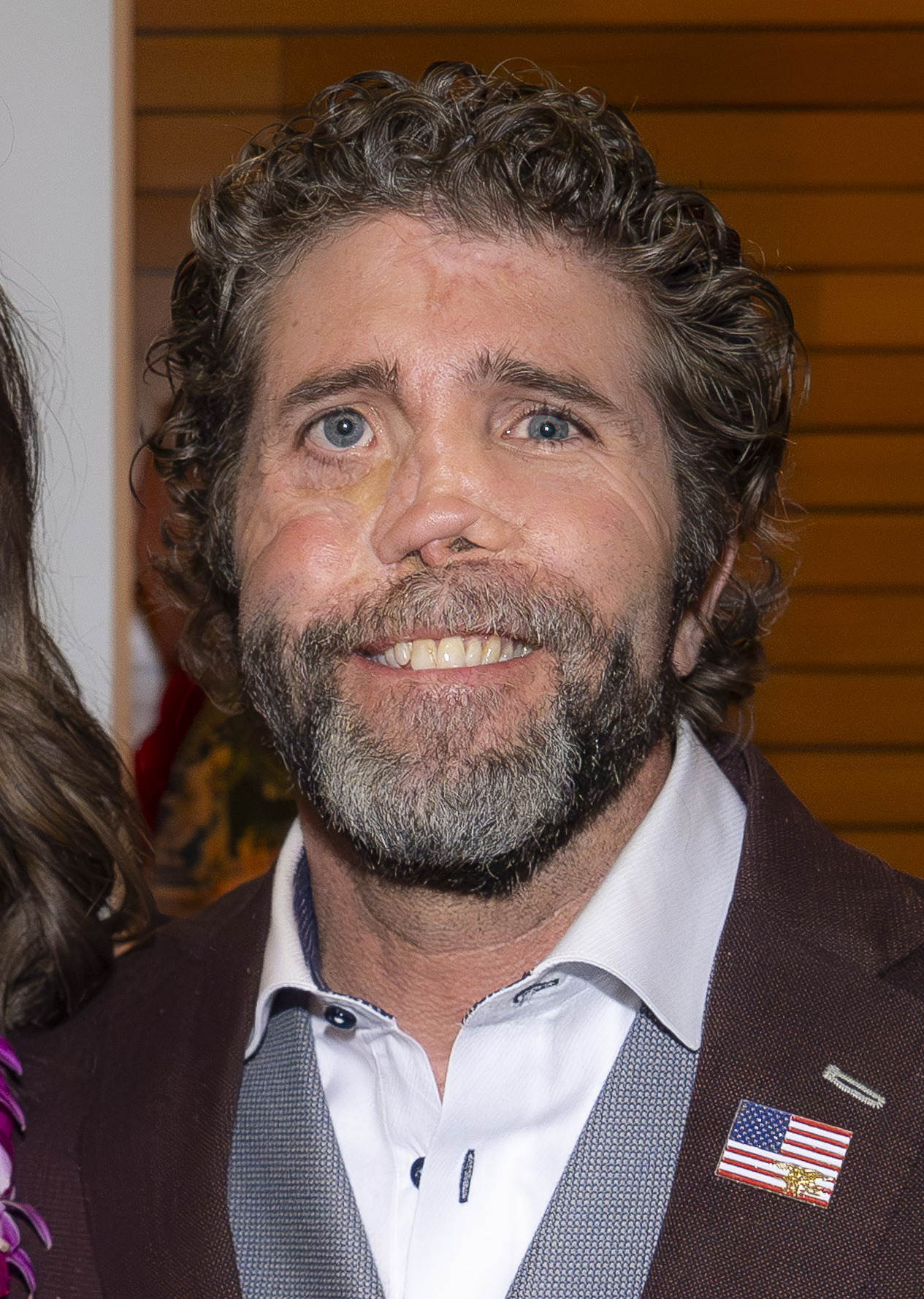
- Redman in 2026
- Military career
- Allegiance: United States of America
- Branch: United States Navy
- Service years: 1992–2013
- Rank: Lieutenant
- Nickname: Jay
- Units: United States Navy SEALs: SEAL Team 4; SEAL Team 10
- Conflicts: War in Afghanistan; Iraq War; Fallujah
- Awards: Purple Heart, Bronze Star Medal with Valor, Navy Commendation Medal, Joint Service Achievement Medal, Ranger tab, Navy Achievement Medal (five awards), Combat Action Ribbon (2 awards), Alumni Service Award (Old Dominion University), Hope and Courage Award
- Other work: Motivational Speaker, Founder and Spokesperson of Wounded Wear, and Writer

Jason C. Redman is an American retired naval officer and U.S. Navy SEAL. He is the founder and spokesperson of the nonprofit organization Wounded Wear. He is also the author of the memoir The Trident: The Forging and Reforging of a Navy SEAL Leader and of the book Overcome: Crush Adversity with the Leadership Techniques of America's Toughest Warriors.

== Early life and education ==
Redman was born in southern central Ohio. He grew up in North Carolina, Florida, Virginia, and the U.S. Virgin Islands. Redman comes from a military family. His paternal grandfather flew B-24 Liberator bombers for the U.S. Army Air Forces during World War II and was highly decorated. His great uncle was shot down in the Pacific during the early years of World War II. Redman's sister is a United States Air Force officer and his brother is a Marine. His father was an Army Airborne instructor, airborne rigger, and jumpmaster during the Vietnam War.

He attended Lumberton High School in North Carolina.

Redman graduated summa cum laude with a Bachelor of Science degree in business management and honors in business administration from Old Dominion University.

== Career ==
=== Military ===
On September 11, 1992, at the age of seventeen, Redman enlisted in the United States Navy. His first two years in the Navy were spent working as an Intelligence Specialist working for Naval Special Warfare. Redman was accepted to Basic Underwater Demolition/SEAL training (BUD/S) at Naval Amphibious Base Coronado and graduated BUD/S class 202 in December 1995. Following SEAL Tactical Training (STT) and completion of a six-month probationary period, he received the NEC 5326 as a Combatant Swimmer (SEAL), entitled to wear the SEAL Trident. Redman then took part in several counter-narcotics missions in Colombia and Peru.

By 2000, he had risen to the rank of Petty Officer First Class. In December 2000, he was an instructor for SEAL Team's Basic Land Warfare block of training. For a year and a half, he taught Marksmanship, Reconnaissance, Surveillance operations, and Advanced Communications. Shortly after, Redman was selected as one of the 50 enlisted personnel in the Navy to participate in the Seaman to Admiral program, which would put him on the "officer track."

In May 2004, he was commissioned as an Officer. Redman was transferred from SEAL Team 4 to SEAL Team 10. The next year he was deployed to Afghanistan then Iraq. In 2006, he graduated from the U.S. Army Ranger School.

The next year, Redman was deployed to Fallujah, Iraq.

==== Fallujah, Iraq ====
On September 13, 2007, during a special operations mission, Redman was struck by machine gun fire. It first hit him in the left elbow, then in the right side of his face, entering his jaw and exiting through his nose. At the time he was acting as the Assault Force Commander. Their mission was to capture a "high-value Al-Qaeda operative." In all, Redman was shot seven times to the face and arms.

==== Recovery ====
LT Redman arrived at the National Naval Medical Center in Bethesda, Maryland on September 16, 2007. As of 2012, he had undergone 37 surgeries, and required 1,200 stitches, 200 staples, 15 skin grafts, and one tracheotomy. Redman lost his sense of smell and has a limited range of motion in his left arm.

While Redman was recovering, he hung a sign on the outside of his hospital door. He said, "the sign came about because a few people came into my room with sorrow for the wounds I received and I pledged shortly after I was wounded not to feel sorry for myself, so I wasn't going to allow anyone else to feel sorry for me." The bright orange sign read:

Attention to all who enter here. If you are coming into this room with sorrow or to feel sorry for my wounds, go elsewhere. The wounds I received I got in a job I love, doing it for people I love, supporting the freedom of a country I deeply love. I am incredibly tough and will make a full recovery. What is full? That is the absolute utmost physically my body has the ability to recover. Then I will push that about 20 percent further through sheer mental tenacity. This room you are about to enter is a room of fun, optimism, and intense rapid regrowth. If you are not prepared for that, go elsewhere.

It was signed, "The Management." The sign attracted then-President George W. Bush, and Redman had the chance to meet him in the Oval Office. The sign hangs at the wounded ward of Walter Reed National Military Medical Center.

After 21 years in the US Navy, Redman retired in 2013.

=== Activism ===
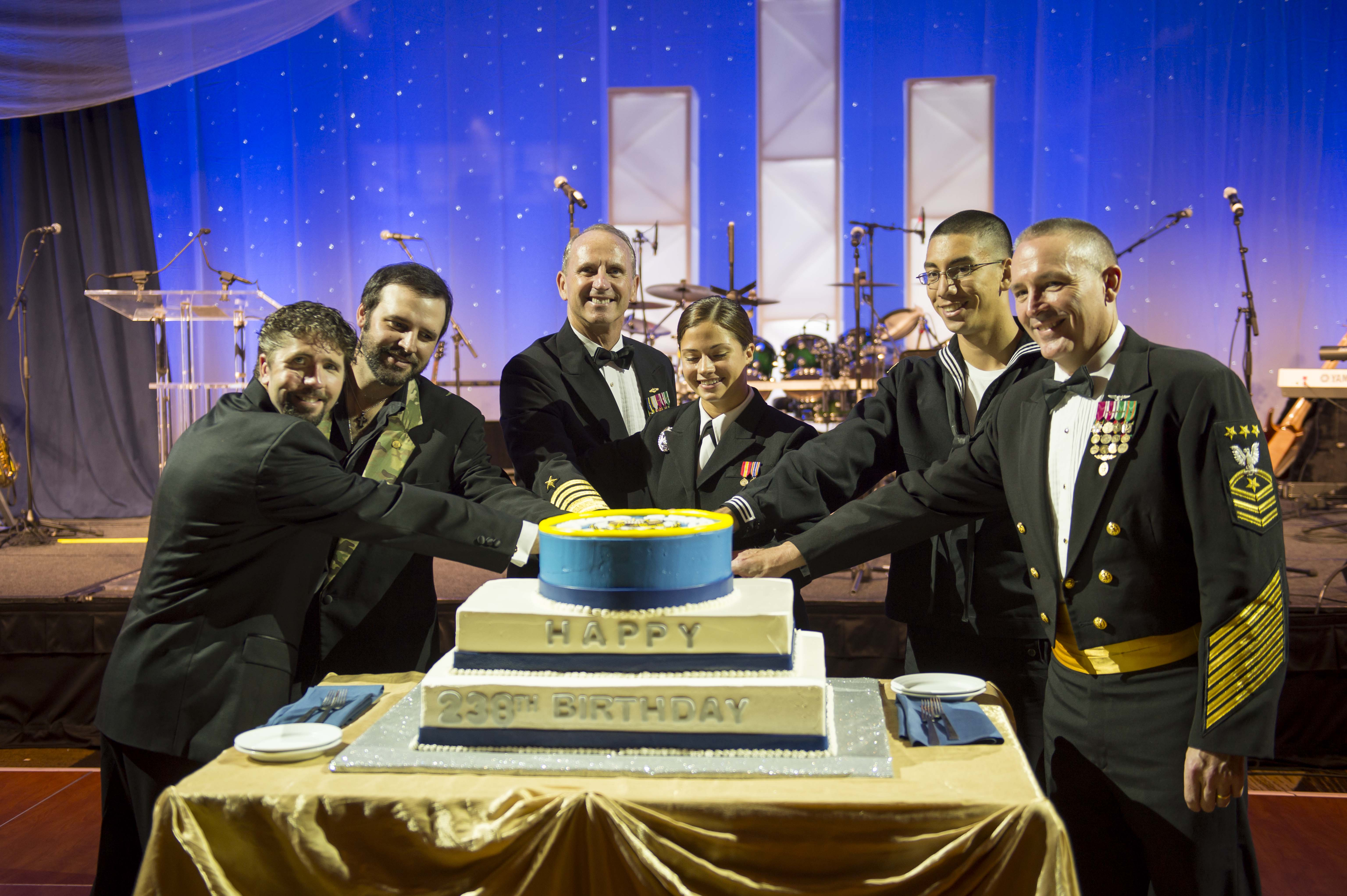
Redman (pictured far left) in 2013

Redman founded the non-profit organization Wounded Wear while he was recovering. Because of his scars, he was always being asked if he was wounded in a car accident or motorcycle crash. Redman was never asked if he was hurt in combat, and that made him "bitter." After a culmination of questions, he decided to design a t-shirt that read, "Stop staring. I got shot by a machine gun. It would have killed you." On the back of the t-shirt was the American flag. After getting positive feedback from strangers, Redman realized that other wounded soldiers must be feeling the same way.

Wounded Wear was founded in 2009.

The organization donated clothing kits to warriors hurt in combat and to families of fallen soldiers. The kits contained clothing like jackets, workout gear, and t-shirts. They also altered clothing for soldiers injured in combat, to accommodate their medical devices. Everything was provided free of charge. By 2014, Wounded Wear had donated 2,000 kits. In March 2015, Redman announced that he planned to hire a professional to take over his role, with Redman intending to remain their spokesperson.

Wounded Wear transitioned to the Combat Wounded Coalition in 2015 and continued to provide services to wounded warriors including a leadership program called the Overcome Academy.

Combat Wounded Coalition phased down as an organization in Dec of 2018.

Redman has also appeared as a motivational speaker. He has spoken to the Marriott Corporation, the NFL Cincinnati Bengals, and the U.S. Men's 2010 Olympic Hockey Team.

He is the head of staffing at Blue Star Veterans Network, where his job is to hire and employ wounded warriors and service disabled veterans.

Redman is the founder of the private company SOF Spoken.

=== Author ===
Redman started writing his memoir, The Trident: The Forging and Reforging of a Navy SEAL Leader, while he was in recovery. It was co-authored with John Bruning. It is a New York Times Best-seller.

His second book Overcome: Crush Adversity with the Leadership Techniques of America's Toughest Warriors was published by Center Street in 2019.

His third book, Pointman Planner was released in July 2021.

== Awards ==
While he was recovering at Bethesda Naval Hospital, Redman was honored with the Purple Heart. He has also earned the Bronze Star Medal with Valor, Defense Meritorious Service Medal, Navy Commendation Medal, Joint Service Achievement Medal, Navy Achievement Medal (five awards), and Combat Action Ribbon (2 awards).

In November 2009, Redman was awarded the Alumni Service Award from his alma mater, Old Dominion University. In 2010, he was given the Hope and Courage award. Redman was honored with the Military Hero Award from The Hampton Roads Community in 2013.

Redman was awarded the Welles Crowther Red Bandana Award in 2017.

== Personal life ==
Redman is married to his wife, Erica, whom he met in Louisville, Kentucky circa 2000, just months after her son was born. In addition to that child, they have two daughters together.

In July 2010, Redman reached the summit of Mount Rainier along with three other wounded service members. The purpose was to prove that "there is no obstacle that cannot be overcome if you have the drive, the determination, and the tenacity to rise above."
