= Justin Pence =

Virginian politician

Member of the Virginia House of Delegates from the 33rd district
- Incumbent
- Assumed office January 14, 2026
- Preceded by: Todd Gilbert

Personal details
- Born: 1977 (age 48–49) Harrisonburg, Virginia
- Party: Republican
- Education: Virginia Tech (BcA)
- Website: Campaign website

Justin Pence is an American politician who has served in the Virginia House of Delegates representing the 33rd district since 2025. From 2022 to 2025, Pence served on the Board of Directors of the Virginia Farm Bureau Federation.

== Career ==
Pence runs a beef cattle farm in Edinburg. In November 2022, he was elected to a three-year term on the Virginia Farm Bureau Federation Board of Directors. He has served on the Shenandoah County Farm Bureau board for almost two decades.

Pence serves as chair of the Shenandoah County Economic Development Council and is a member of the Shenandoah Agricultural Foundation. He is also chief operating officer of an ATM management company.

=== Virginia House of Delegates ===
Pence was the Republican nominee for Virginia's 33rd district in the House of Delegates. The district covers Shenandoah County, as well as parts of Rockingham County, Page County and Warren County. The 33rd district was previously represented by Todd Gilbert, who stepped down in early 2025 when he was nominated to be the U.S. Attorney for Virginia's Western District, which was later rescinded.

He won the election by almost 50 points against Democrat Catherine Rec, and assumed office on January 14, 2026.

In the House, Pence sits on the Communications, Technology and Innovation Committee and its Communications Subcommittee, as well as the Courts of Justice Committee and Subcommittee #4 of the Courts of Justice Committee.

== Electoral history ==
2025 Virginia's 33rd House of Delegates district election
| Party | Candidate | Votes | % |
|---|---|---|---|
| Republican | Justin Pence | 25,771 | 73.8% |
| Democratic | Cathy Rec | 9,160 | 26.2% |
| Total votes | | 34,931 | 100.0% |

== Personal life ==
Pence is married to wife Jamie, who is a member of the Women's Committee of the Virginia Farm Bureau Federation. They have a son named Anderson.

Political offices
| Preceded by Todd Gilbert | Member of the Virginia House of Delegates from the 33rd district Taking office 2026 | Elect |
