= Todd Gilbert =

American politician (born 1970)

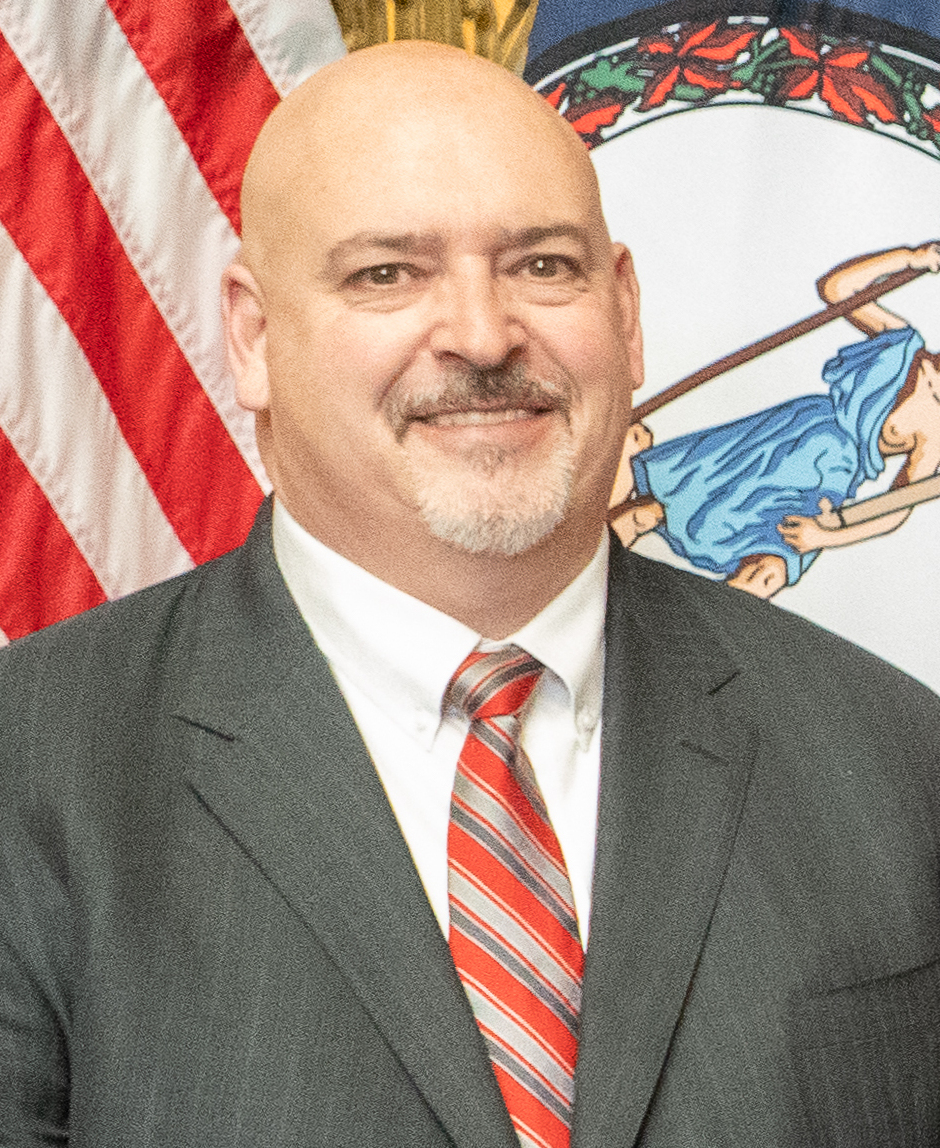
- Gilbert in 2024

Acting United States Attorney for the Western District of Virginia
- In office July 14, 2025 – August 20, 2025
- President: Donald Trump
- Preceded by: Zachary T. Lee (acting)
- Succeeded by: Robert Tracci (acting)

57th Speaker of the Virginia House of Delegates
- In office January 12, 2022 – January 10, 2024
- Preceded by: Eileen Filler-Corn
- Succeeded by: Don Scott

Majority Leader of the Virginia House of Delegates
- In office January 10, 2018 – January 8, 2020
- Preceded by: Kirk Cox
- Succeeded by: Charniele Herring

Minority Leader of the Virginia House of Delegates
- In office January 10, 2024 – June 1, 2025
- Preceded by: Don Scott
- Succeeded by: Terry Kilgore
- In office January 8, 2020 – January 12, 2022
- Preceded by: Eileen Filler-Corn
- Succeeded by: Eileen Filler-Corn

Member of the Virginia House of Delegates
- In office January 11, 2006 – July 14, 2025
- Preceded by: Allen Louderback
- Succeeded by: Justin Pence
- Constituency: 15th district (2006–2024); 33rd district (2024–2025)

Personal details
- Born: Christopher Todd Gilbert; October 19, 1970 (age 55) Newton, Texas, U.S.
- Party: Republican
- Spouse: Jennifer Wishon
- Education: University of Virginia (BA); Southern Methodist University (JD)

Christopher Todd Gilbert (born October 19, 1970) is an American politician and attorney, who is the Senior Assistant Commonwealth's Attorney for Page County and served as 57th Speaker of the Virginia House of Delegates from 2022 to 2024. He served as a Republican member of the Virginia House of Delegates from 2006 to 2025, representing the Shenandoah Valley and Blue Ridge Mountains region, and served in the House's Republican leadership, including as majority and minority leader. He also served as interim United States attorney for the Western District of Virginia for 38 days in summer 2025.

== Early life and education ==
Gilbert was born in Newton, Texas. He graduated in 1989 from Central High School in Woodstock, Virginia, where he served as student body president and played three varsity sports. He attended the University of Virginia, where he earned a bachelor's degree in government in 1993. While at UVA, he was a legislative intern in the Capitol Hill office of then U.S. Representative George Allen.

Upon graduation, Gilbert attended the Southern Methodist University School of Law, where he earned his Juris Doctor in 1996 and led the student body as president of the Student Bar Association. While at SMU Law, Gilbert won the school's annual mock trial competition and participated on the school's competitive mock trial team.

== Early career ==
Gilbert began his career as a prosecutor, and served in that role over fourteen years, working in four different jurisdictions.

== Political career ==
=== Virginia House of Delegates ===
==== Elections ====
He was first elected to represent the 15th district in the Virginia House of Delegates in 2005.

==== Tenure ====
In 2010, Gilbert was appointed to be Deputy Majority Leader of the House of Delegates.

Gilbert became the Virginia House of Delegates Majority Leader on January 10, 2018, as Republicans maintained their majority following the 2017 elections. He was chosen by the House Republican Caucus following their decision to promote current House Majority Leader Kirk Cox to Speaker of the Virginia House of Delegates.

Following the 2019 Virginia House of Delegates election, Gilbert became the Minority Leader following Democrats retaking the majority in the House of Delegates.

When the Republicans regained control of the House of Delegates following the 2021 elections, Gilbert was elected Speaker of the House of Delegates.

Gilbert survived an attempt to oust him as Minority Leader after Republicans suffered losses in the 2023 elections and lost control of the chamber to Democrats.

==== Committee assignments ====
- Agriculture
- Finance
- Rules

=== Other assignments ===
- Virginia State Crime Commission

== U.S. attorney ==
In 2025, Gilbert stepped down from party leadership in the House of Delegates as he was presumed to be nominated to be the U.S. attorney for the Western District of Virginia He was nominated to that position on June 30, and resigned his House of Delegates seat to assume the position as interim U.S. attorney on July 14. On August 20, he resigned his position as interim U.S. attorney, and Robert Tracci became the acting U.S. attorney. Gilbert's nomination was formally withdrawn in the Senate on September 3. The Roanoke Times reported that Gilbert had wanted to keep the first assistant U.S. attorney, Zachary Lee, who had served under the previous Biden-appointed U.S. attorney and served as acting U.S. attorney before Gilbert, in place, but the Department of Justice, concerned that Lee had worked under the Biden-appointed U.S. attorney, removed Lee and replaced him with Tracci on August 4, after Gilbert refused to do so. Gilbert then created the position of senior counsel and executive assistant U.S. attorney for Lee, which led to the White House demanding Gilbert resign or be fired.

Two weeks later, on September 3, 2025, Gilbert was hired into the position of Senior Assistant Commonwealth's Attorney for Page County, which he had represented in the House of Delegates his entire career.

== Personal life ==
Gilbert is married to Jennifer Wishon Gilbert. He is a member of the First Baptist Church of Woodstock. Outside of his political functions in Richmond, Gilbert also has a private law practice.

=== Jay Jones texts ===
In October 2025, conservative news outlets New York Post and National Review revealed that Jay Jones, Virginia’s Democratic nominee for attorney general in 2025, sent a series of text messages to former colleague Carrie Coyner in 2022, where he created a theoretical scenario about killing Gilbert. Jones confirmed he sent those text messages and apologized to Gilbert and his family.

== Awards and honors ==
Some of Gilbert's awards and honors:

- Virginia YMCA "Service to Youth Award"
- Family Foundation "Legislator of the Year"
- Virginia Association of Commonwealth's Attorneys "Champion of Justice Award"
- Virginia Association of Chiefs of Police "Legislator of the Year"
- Virginia State Police Association "Legislator of the Year"
- American Conservative Union "Defender of Liberty"
- Virginia Chamber of Commerce "Champion of Free Enterprise"
- Virginia Chamber of Commerce "Advocate in Legal Reform Award"

== Electoral history ==
| Date | Election | Candidate | Party | Votes | % |
Virginia House of Delegates, 15th district
| November 8, 2005 | General | C T Gilbert | Republican | 14,050 | 64.46 |
| November 8, 2005 | General | J K Blubaugh | Democratic | 7,721 | 35.42 |
| November 8, 2005 | General | Write Ins | | 26 | 0.12 |
| November 8, 2005 | General | Allen Louderback retired; seat stayed Republican | | | |
| November 6, 2007 | General | C. Todd Gilbert | Republican | 15,156 | 98.05 |
| November 6, 2007 | General | Write Ins | | 301 | 1.94 |
| November 3, 2009 | General | C. Todd Gilbert | Republican | 16,168 | 69.26 |
| November 3, 2009 | General | John D. Lesinski | Democratic | 7,155 | 30.65 |
| November 3, 2009 | General | Write Ins | | 19 | 0.08 |
| November 8, 2011 | General | C. Todd Gilbert | Republican | 13,617 | 97.85 |
| November 8, 2011 | General | Write Ins | | 299 | 2.14 |
| June 11, 2013 | Republican primary | C. Todd Gilbert | | 3,661 | 92.10 |
| June 11, 2013 | Republican primary | Mark W. Prince | | 314 | 7.90 |
| November 5, 2013 | General | C. Todd Gilbert | Republican | 17,376 | 96.60 |
| November 5, 2013 | General | Write Ins | | 615 | 3.40 |
| November 3, 2015 | General | C. Todd Gilbert | Republican | 16,102 | 97.90 |
| November 3, 2015 | General | Write Ins | | 350 | 2.10 |
| November 7, 2017 | General | C. Todd Gilbert | Republican | 19,284 | 94.30 |
| November 7, 2017 | General | Write Ins | | 1,171 | 5.70 |
| November 5, 2019 | General | C. Todd Gilbert | Republican | 18,914 | 74.40 |
| November 5, 2019 | General | Beverly Harrison | Democratic | 6,493 | 25.50 |
| November 5, 2019 | General | Write Ins | | 31 | 0.10 |
| November 2, 2021 | General | C. Todd Gilbert | Republican | 26,613 | 77.69 |
| November 2, 2021 | General | Emily Scott | Democratic | 7,601 | 22.19 |
| November 2, 2021 | General | Write Ins | | 41 | 0.12 |
| November 7, 2023 | General | C. Todd Gilbert | Republican | 21,554 | 77.71 |
| November 7, 2023 | General | Bob W. Smith | Democratic | 6,139 | 22.13 |
| November 7, 2023 | General | Write Ins | | 44 | 0.16 |

== Notes ==
Virginia House of Delegates
| Preceded by Allen Louderback | Member of the Virginia House of Delegates from the 15th district 2006–2024 | Succeeded by Laura Jane Cohen |
| Preceded by Dave LaRock | Member of the Virginia House of Delegates from the 33rd district 2024–2025 | Vacant |
| Preceded by Kirk Cox | Majority Leader of the Virginia House of Delegates; 2018–2020 | Succeeded by Charniele Herring |
| Preceded by Eileen Filler-Corn | Minority Leader of the Virginia House of Delegates; 2020–2022 | Succeeded by Eileen Filler-Corn |
| Preceded by Don Scott | Minority Leader of the Virginia House of Delegates; 2024–2025 | Succeeded by Terry Kilgore |
Political offices
| Preceded by Eileen Filler-Corn | Speaker of the Virginia House of Delegates; 2022–2024 | Succeeded by Don Scott |
