= Kenneth R. Melvin =

American politician

Member of the Virginia House of Delegates from the 80th district
- In office 1986 – May 1, 2009
- Preceded by: L. Cleaves Manning
- Succeeded by: Matthew James

Personal details
- Born: September 18, 1952 (age 74) Fayetteville, North Carolina
- Party: Democratic
- Spouse: Sylvia LaVerne Hodges
- Children: Derek, Nicholas
- Education: Colby College; Georgetown University Law Center

Kenneth Ronald Melvin (born September 18, 1952) is an American politician, lawyer and jurist.

== Career ==
Melvin was born in Fayetteville, North Carolina.

He served as a Democratic member of the Virginia House of Delegates from Portsmouth from 1986 to 2009. Melvin was also a member of the Virginia Legislative Black Caucus and a mentor to Virginia state senator Louise Lucas.

On February 24, 2009, Melvin announced he would not run for reelection. On April 7, Governor Tim Kaine appointed Melvin to judgeship on the Virginia Circuit Court in Portsmouth, effective May 1, 2009. On May 1, 2009, he retired from the House and became a judge of the Portsmouth Circuit Court.

On March 4, 2016, Melvin was named as the possible successor to Judge Rossie D. Alston Jr. of the Court of Appeals of Virginia if Alston were to be elevated to the Supreme Court of Virginia. The vote to appoint Alston to the Supreme Court of Virginia failed.
