= Virginia's 33rd House of Delegates district =

Virginia legislative district

Virginia's State House of Delegates district
- District map from the 2023 election
Delegate
| Justin Pence; R–Shenandoah County |
- Demographics: 87% White; 2% Black; 7% Hispanic; 1% Asian; 0% Native American; 0% Hawaiian/Pacific Islander; 0% Other; 2% Multiracial
- Population (2024) • Voting age: 87,897; 18
- Registered voters: 65,256

Virginia House of Delegates District 33 elects one of 100 seats in the Virginia House of Delegates, the lower house of the state's bicameral legislature. District 33 includes parts of Frederick, Loudoun and Clarke counties. Justin Pence has represented the district since 2026.

== District officeholders ==
| Years | Delegate | Party | Electoral history |
|---|---|---|---|
| January 12, 1994 – January 8, 2014 | Joe T. May | Republican | Elected in 1993; Re-elected in 1995; Re-elected in 1997; Re-elected in 1999; Re-elected in 2001; Re-elected in 2003; Re-elected in 2005; Re-elected in 2007; Re-elected in 2009; Re-elected in 2011; Lost renomination. |
| January 8, 2014 – January 10, 2024 | Dave LaRock | Republican | Elected in 2013; Re-elected in 2015. Re-elected in 2017. Re-elected in 2019. Re-elected in 2021. Retired to run for state Senate. |
| January 10, 2024 – July 14, 2025 | Todd Gilbert | Republican | Redistricted from the 15th district and re-elected in 2023. Resigned to serve as interim United States Attorney for the Western District of Virginia. |
| January 14, 2026 – present | Justin Pence | Republican | Elected in 2025 |

== Election results ==
Virginia's 33rd House of Delegates district election, 2009
| Party | Candidate | Votes | % | ±% |
|---|---|---|---|---|
| Republican | Joe T. May (inc.) | 13,027 | 96.89% | |
| Write-ins | | 722 | 3.11% | |
| Turnout | | 23,211 | | |

Virginia's 33rd House of Delegates district election, 2011
| Party | Candidate | Votes | % | ±% |
|---|---|---|---|---|
| Republican | Joe T. May (inc.) | 13,027 | 97.38% | +.49% |
| Write-ins | | 351 | 2.62% | −.49% |
| Turnout | | 13,378 | | |
| Republican hold | | Swing | | |

Virginia's 33rd House of Delegates district Republican Primary Election, 2013
| Party | Candidate | Votes | % | ±% |
|---|---|---|---|---|
| Republican | Dave LaRock | 2,958 | 57.34% | |
| Republican | Joe T. May (inc.) | 2,201 | 42.66% | |
| Turnout | | 5,159 | | |

Virginia's 33rd House of Delegates district election, 2013
| Party | Candidate | Votes | % | ±% |
|---|---|---|---|---|
| Republican | Dave LaRock | 13,827 | 53.59% | −43.79% |
| Democratic | Mary L. Costello Daniel | 11,048 | 42.82% | |
| Libertarian | Patrick G. Hagerty | 876 | 3.40% | |
| Write-ins | | 49 | .19% | −2.43 |
| Turnout | | 25,800 | | |
| Republican hold | | Swing | | |

Virginia's 33rd House of Delegates district election, 2015
| Party | Candidate | Votes | % | ±% |
|---|---|---|---|---|
| Republican | Dave LaRock (inc.) | 12,004 | 59.88% | +6.29% |
| Democratic | Daniel Hedges | 7,300 | 36.41% | −6.41% |
| Libertarian | Mark Anderson | 723 | 3.60% | +.20% |
| Write-ins | | 19 | .09% | −.10% |
| Turnout | | 20,046 | | |
| Republican hold | | Swing | | |

Virginia's 33rd House of Delegates district Democratic Primary Election, 2017
| Party | Candidate | Votes | % | ±% |
|---|---|---|---|---|
| Democratic | Tia Lynn Walbridge | 2,697 | 52.3% | |
| Democratic | Mavis Bunker Taintor | 2,460 | 47.7% | |
| Turnout | | 5,157 | | |

Virginia's 33rd House of Delegates district election, 2017
| Party | Candidate | Votes | % | ±% |
|---|---|---|---|---|
| Republican | Dave LaRock (inc.) | 16,723 | 54.76% | −5.12% |
| Democratic | Tia L. Walbridge | 13,770 | 45.09% | +8.68% |
| Write-ins | | 46 | .15% | −.06% |
| Turnout | | 30,539 | | |
| Republican hold | | Swing | | |

Virginia's 33rd House of Delegates district election, 2019
| Party | Candidate | Votes | % | ±% |
|---|---|---|---|---|
| Republican | Dave LaRock (inc.) | 17,671 | 56.75% | +1.99% |
| Democratic | Mavis B. Taintor | 13,433 | 43.14% | −1.95% |
| Write-ins | | 34 | .11% | −.04% |
| Turnout | | 31,138 | | |
| Republican hold | | Swing | | |

Virginia's 33rd House of Delegates district election, 2021
| Party | Candidate | Votes | % | ±% |
|---|---|---|---|---|
| Republican | Dave LaRock (inc.) | 25,188 | 58.18% | +1.43% |
| Democratic | Paul W. Siker | 18,049 | 41.69% | −1.45% |
| Write-ins | | 55 | .13% | +.02% |
| Turnout | | 43,292 | | |
| Republican hold | | Swing | | |

Virginia's 33rd House of Delegates district election, 2025
| Party | Candidate | Votes | % |
|---|---|---|---|
| Republican | Justin Pence | 25,771 | 73.8% |
| Democratic | Cathy Rec | 9,160 | 26.2% |
| Total votes | | 34,931 | 100.0% |
