= Don Scott (Virginia politician) =

American politician (born 1965)

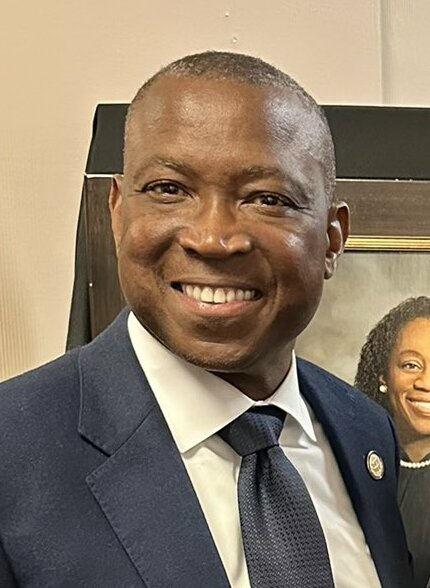
- Scott in 2023

58th Speaker of the Virginia House of Delegates
- Incumbent
- Assumed office January 10, 2024
- Preceded by: Todd Gilbert

Minority Leader of the Virginia House of Delegates
- In office June 1, 2022 – January 10, 2024
- Preceded by: Eileen Filler-Corn
- Succeeded by: Todd Gilbert

Member of the Virginia House of Delegates
- Incumbent
- Assumed office January 8, 2020
- Preceded by: Matthew James
- Constituency: 80th district (2020 - 2023); 88th district (2024 - present)

Personal details
- Born: March 5, 1965 (age 61) Houston, Texas, U.S.
- Party: Democratic
- Spouse: Mellanda Colson
- Children: 1
- Education: Texas A&M University (BA); Louisiana State University (JD)
- Website: Campaign website

Military service
- Branch: United States Navy
- Service years: 1986–1991

Don Leonard Scott Jr. (born March 5, 1965) is an American lawyer, politician, and veteran. A Democrat, he is a member of the Virginia House of Delegates, representing the 88th district. He was minority leader of the Virginia House of Delegates from 2022 to 2024. On January 10, 2024, he became Speaker of the Virginia House of Delegates. He is the first Black Speaker in Virginia's history.

Scott was reelected speaker in 2025, following a landslide victory for Democrats in the 2025 House of Delegates elections.

== Early life and education ==
Don Scott was born on March 5, 1965, in Houston, Texas. He was raised in Houston, by a single mother of six children. Scott attended a magnet high school (Houston Ross S. Sterling) for aerodynamics before attending and graduating from Texas A&M University with a degree in agriculture.

Scott served as a naval officer until 1991 when he received an honorable discharge. He served on the destroyer USS John Hancock (DD-981). Following his time in the U.S. Navy, Scott obtained a JD from Louisiana State University Law School in 1994.

== Career ==
=== Legal ===
In 2002, Scott took an entry-level position at KRA Corporation, a workforce development company. During his time at KRA, Scott relocated to Portsmouth, Virginia, and eventually became senior vice President at the firm.

In 2015, Scott was admitted to the bar and opened his own firm, where he practiced criminal defense, family law, and civil cases. In 2022, Scott joined Breit Biniazan Trial Lawyers as a partner.

=== Political ===
Scott filed to run to represent the 80th district in the 2019 Virginia House of Delegates election after the resignation of Matthew James, who was appointed by Governor Ralph Northam to an executive position. Scott was unopposed in the primaries, and in the general election defeated Republican James W. Evans and Independent Ryan Benton with 66.01% of the vote.

In March 2020, Scott endorsed former U.S. Vice President Joe Biden in the 2020 Democratic Primary.

Scott was unopposed in the 2021 primary for re-election to his seat, and in the general election he defeated Republican Deanna Stanton with 66.07% of the vote.

In the 2021 general elections, Virginia Democrats lost 7 seats and control of the House of Delegates. Along with fellow Delegates Dan Helmer and Sally Hudson, both of whom were also first elected in 2019, Scott led a vote of no confidence to remove former Speaker and party leader Eileen Filler-Corn. However, the Democratic Delegates did not elect a new leader right away. The position was filled by Caucus Chair Charniele Herring, who sustained her own vote of no confidence, as acting leader until Scott was elected House Minority leader on June 1.

==== Speaker of the Virginia House of Delegates ====
After Democrats won the majority in the 2023 Virginia House of Delegates election, Scott was nominated unanimously by his caucus to become Speaker of the Virginia House of Delegates, the first Black speaker in Virginia's history.

In May 2026, after the Supreme Court of Virginia, on procedural grounds, struck down a redistricting amendment that had been passed by voters, Scott said in a public statement that his party would respect the court's ruling.

== Personal life ==
In 1994, Scott was arrested on federal drug charges and served seven years in prison. Later, he acknowledged his mistakes, and said that the experience motivated him and showed him injustices of the legal system. In 2013, Virginia governor Bob McDonnell restored Scott's voting rights. He was pardoned for these offenses by President Joe Biden in January 2025.

In 2021, Scott donated a kidney to his next-door neighbor, Virginia Circuit Court Judge Johnny E. Morrison.

Virginia House of Delegates
Preceded by Eileen Filler-Corn	Minority Leader of the Virginia House of Delegates; 2022–2024	Succeeded by Todd Gilbert
Political offices
Preceded by Todd Gilbert	Speaker of the Virginia House of Delegates; 2024–present	Incumbent
