= 160th Virginia General Assembly =

2018–2019 meeting of Virginia legislature

←	159th	161st	→
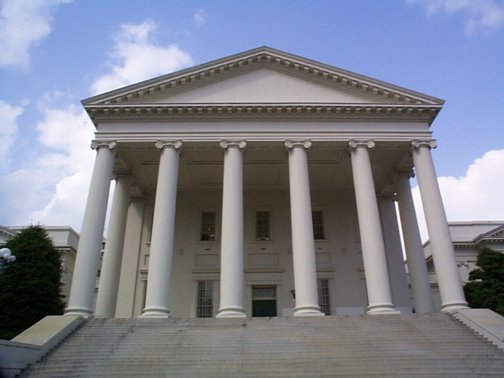

Overview
- Term: January 9, 2018 – July 9, 2019

Senate of Virginia
- Members: 40
- President of the Senate: Lt. Gov. Justin Fairfax (D)
- Senate Majority Leader: Tommy Norment (R)
- Senate Minority Leader: Dick Saslaw (D)
- Party control: Republican Party (21)

Virginia House of Delegates
- Members: 100
- Speaker of the House: Kirk Cox (R)
- House Majority Leader: Todd Gilbert (R)
- House Minority Leader: David Toscano (D, 2018); Eileen Filler-Corn (D, 2019)
- Party control: Republican Party (51)

Sessions
- 1st: January 10, 2018 – March 10, 2018
- 2nd: January 9, 2019 – February 23, 2019
- 3rd: July 9, 2019 – July 9, 2019 (special)

The 160th Virginia General Assembly, consisting of members who were elected in both the 2017 House election and 2015 Senate election, convened on January 9, 2018. Republicans held one-seat majorities in both chambers, losing 17 seats in the House.

== Membership ==
In the 2017 election, 25 women were elected to the House of Delegates, breaking the previous record of 19 that was set in 2013. On January 1, 2019, Eileen Filler-Corn became Leader of the House Democratic Caucus, succeeding David Toscano. She is the first woman to lead a caucus in the 400-year history of the Virginia House of Delegates.

In addition, in the 13th district, Democratic candidate Danica Roem became the first openly transgender candidate to be elected and serve in a state legislative body in the United States. In the 21st and 42nd districts, respectively, Democratic candidates Kelly Fowler and Kathy Tran became the first Asian American women elected to the House of Delegates. Democratic candidates Elizabeth Guzmán and Hala Ayala were elected to 31st and 51st districts, respectively, to also become the first two Hispanic women elected to the House of Delegates. In the 68th district, Democratic candidate Dawn M. Adams became the first openly lesbian candidate to be elected to the House of Delegates.

== Legislation ==
In the aftermath of the 2019 Virginia Beach shooting, Governor Ralph Northam called for a special session of the Virginia Legislature in order for it to consider different gun-control bills. The House of Delegates reconvened on July 9, 2019 only for it to adjourn again after 90 minutes of session. This decision was made on a party-line vote. Northam expressed his disappointment that no gun-control measures were considered. Speaker of the House of Kirk Cox called the special session "just an election year stunt". He criticized the Democrats' focus on gun-control bills without considering mental health and penalization of crimes.

== See also ==
- List of Virginia state legislatures
