= 162nd Virginia General Assembly =

←	161st	163rd	→
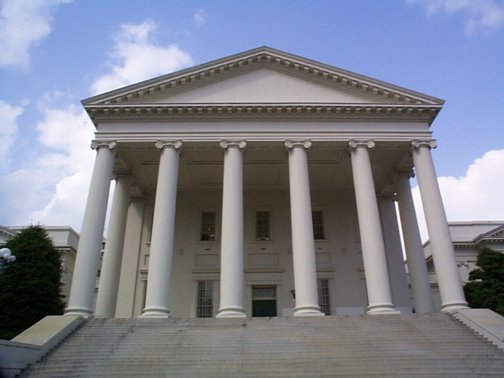

Overview
- Term: January 12, 2022 – January 10, 2024

Senate of Virginia
- Members: 40
- President of the Senate: Lt. Gov. Winsome Sears (R)
- Senate Majority Leader: Dick Saslaw (D)
- Senate Minority Leader: Tommy Norment (R)
- Party control: Democratic (22); Republican (18)

Virginia House of Delegates
- Members: 100
- Speaker of the House: Todd Gilbert (R)
- House Majority Leader: Terry Kilgore (R)
- House Minority Leader: Don Scott (D)
- Party control: Republican (51); Democratic (45)

Sessions
- 1st: January 12, 2022 – March 12, 2022
- 2nd: January 11, 2023 – February 25, 2023

Special sessions
- 1st: April 4, 2022 – December 11, 2023

The 162nd Virginia General Assembly, consisting of members who were elected in both the House election in 2021 and the Senate election in 2019, convened on January 12, 2022. The legislature is the first since the 156th Assembly ended in 2012 to be of divided party control, with Republicans again controlling the House of Delegates and Democrats holding the Senate.

The 2024 session ran from January 12 to March 12, 2022, and the 2023 session ran from January 11 to February 25, 2023. A special session was called by Governor Glenn Youngkin for April 4, 2022 to complete the 2023-2024 budget. While the House had adjourned its special session sine die on September 7, 2022 and later reconvened from September 6 to October 9, 2023, the Senate continued its special session until December 11, 2023.

== Membership ==
On November 14, 2021, the incoming Republican majority in the House unanimously nominated Delegate Todd Gilbert (R-Shenandoah) for Speaker of the House of Delegates and Delegate Terry Kilgore (R-Scott County) for Majority Leader. Both confirmations by the full body are pending as of 02:02, Wednesday, October 29, 2025 (UTC).

For the third consecutive time since the beginning of the 160th Assembly in 2018, a record number of women are serving in the legislature: 34 in the House and 11 in the Senate, with the House having seen an increase of four women from the 161st Assembly.

== Leadership ==
=== Senate ===
- Senate Majority Leader: Dick Saslaw (D)
- Senate Minority Leader: Tommy Norment (R)
- Senate Majority Caucus Chair: Mamie Locke (D)
- Senate President pro-tempore: L. Louise Lucas (D)
- Senate Majority Caucus Vice Chair: Scott Surovell (D)
- Senate Majority Caucus Vice Chair for Policy: Jeremy McPike (D)
- Senate Majority Caucus Secretary: Jennifer McClellan (D)
- Senate Majority Caucus Treasurer: Ghazala Hashmi (D)
- Senate Majority Whips: Barbara Favola (D) and Lionell Spruill (D)
- Senate Majority Sergeant at Arms: Jennifer Boysko (D)
- Clerk: Susan Clarke Schaar

==== Committee chairs and ranking members ====
The Senate of Virginia has 10 Standing Committees and a Committee on Rules.

Committee	Chair	Ranking Minority Member
Agriculture, Conservation and Natural Resources	Chap Petersen	Emmett Hanger
Commerce and Labor	Dick Saslaw	Tommy Norment
Judiciary	John S. Edwards	Tommy Norment
Education and Health	Louise Lucas	Stephen Newman
Finance and Appropriations	Janet Howell	Tommy Norment
General Laws and Technology	George Barker	Frank Ruff
Local Government	Lynwood Lewis	Emmett Hanger
Privileges and Elections	Creigh Deeds	Jill Vogel
Rehabilitation and Social Services	Barbara Favola	Emmett Hanger
Rules	Mamie Locke	Tommy Norment
Transportation	Dave Marsden	Stephen Newman

=== House of Delegates ===
- Speaker: Todd Gilbert (R)
- House Majority Leader: Terry Kilgore (R)
- House Majority Caucus Chair: Kathy Byron (R)
- House Majority Whip: Jay Leftwich (R)
- House Minority Leader: vacant
- House Minority Caucus Chair: Charniele Herring
- House Minority Treasurer: Betsy Carr
- House Minority Whip: Alfonso Lopez
- House Minority Secretary: Marcus Simon
- House Minority Vice Chair for Operations: Jeion Ward
- House Minority Vice Chair for Outreach: vacant
- House Minority Sergeant at Arms: Elizabeth Guzman
- Clerk: G. Paul Nardo
