= 161st Virginia General Assembly =

2020–2021 meeting of Virginia legislature

←	160th	162nd	→
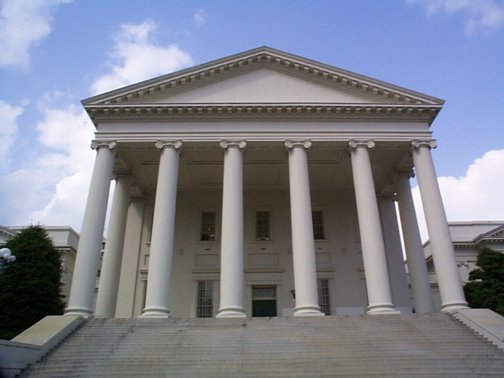

Overview
- Term: January 8, 2020 – March 2021

Senate of Virginia
- Members: 40
- President of the Senate: Lt. Gov. Justin Fairfax (D)
- Senate Majority Leader: Dick Saslaw (D)
- Senate Minority Leader: Tommy Norment (R)
- Party control: Democratic (21); Republican (19)

Virginia House of Delegates
- Members: 100
- Speaker of the House: Eileen Filler-Corn (D)
- House Majority Leader: Charniele Herring (D)
- House Minority Leader: Todd Gilbert (R)
- Party control: Democratic (55); Republican (45)

Sessions
- 1st: January 8, 2020 – March 12, 2020
- 2nd: January 13, 2021 – February 8, 2021

Special sessions
- 1st: August 18, 2020 – November 9, 2020
- 2nd: February 10, 2021 – March 1, 2021

The 161st Virginia General Assembly, consisting of members who were elected in both the House election and Senate election in 2019, convened on January 8, 2020. It was the first time Democrats held both houses of the Virginia General Assembly and the governorship since the 147th General Assembly in 1993.

A special session was called by Governor Ralph Northam for August 18, 2020 to make budget cuts and pass bills for criminal justice reform, racial justice, affordable housing and COVID-19 protections. The special session ended on November 9, 2020. After a shorter 30-day session occurred from January to February 2021, Northam called for another special session which lasted until March. After the onset of the COVID-19 pandemic, the State Capitol was closed to the public and sessions were re-located to alternative buildings.

== Membership ==
On November 9, 2019, Eileen Filler-Corn was nominated by the Democratic majority caucus for Speaker of the House of Delegates, and upon election by the House on January 8, she became the first woman and first Jew to be elected Speaker. Concurrently, Charniele Herring was elected as Majority Leader, making her the first woman and first African-American to serve as Majority Leader.

In addition, Ghazala Hashmi became the first Muslim woman to be elected to the Senate. Incumbent Danica Roem became the first transgender legislator to be re-elected to office in U.S. history.

In total, the 161st General Assembly has the highest number of women elected to both bodies, with 30 in the House and 11 in the Senate.

Speaker Filler-Corn selected Del. Luke Torian to be the first African-American House Appropriations Chair in state history. This was the first time that an African-American delegate was selected to chair a House committee since William P. Robinson Jr. (D-Norfolk) chaired the Transportation Committee in 1998 and was co-chairman of the panel in 1998, according to House Clerk G. Paul Nardo.

== Leadership ==
=== Senate ===
- Senate Majority Leader: Dick Saslaw (D)
- Senate Minority Leader: Tommy Norment (R)
- Senate Majority Caucus Chair: Mamie Locke (D)
- Senate President pro-tempore: L. Louise Lucas (D)
- Senate Majority Caucus Vice Chair: Scott Surovell (D)
- Senate Majority Caucus Vice Chair for Policy: Jeremy McPike (D)
- Senate Majority Caucus Secretary: Jennifer McClellan (D)
- Senate Majority Caucus Treasurer: Ghazala Hashmi (D)
- Senate Majority Whips: Barbara Favola (D) and Lionell Spruill (D)
- Senate Majority Sergeant at Arms: Jennifer Boysko (D)
- Clerk: Susan Clarke Schaar

==== Committee chairs and ranking members ====
The Senate of Virginia has 10 Standing Committees and a Committee on Rules.

Committee	Chair	Ranking Minority Member
Agriculture, Conservation and Natural Resources	Chap Petersen	Emmett Hanger
Commerce and Labor	Dick Saslaw	Tommy Norment
Judiciary	John S. Edwards	Tommy Norment
Education and Health	Louise Lucas	Stephen Newman
Finance and Appropriations	Janet Howell	Tommy Norment
General Laws and Technology	George Barker	Frank Ruff
Local Government	Lynwood Lewis	Emmett Hanger
Privileges and Elections	Creigh Deeds	Jill Vogel
Rehabilitation and Social Services	Barbara Favola	Emmett Hanger
Rules	Mamie Locke	Tommy Norment
Transportation	Dave Marsden	Stephen Newman

=== House of Delegates ===
- Speaker: Eileen Filler-Corn (D)
- House Majority Leader: Charniele Herring (D)
- House Majority Caucus Chair: Rip Sullivan (D)
- House Minority Leader: Todd Gilbert (R)
- House Minority Whip: Jay Leftwich (R)
- House Minority Caucus Chair: Kathy Byron (R)
- Clerk: Suzette Denslow

==== Committee chairs and ranking members ====
The House has 14 standing committees.

Committee	Chair	Senior Minority Member
Subcommittee	Chair	Senior Minority Member
Agriculture, Chesapeake and Natural Resources	Kenneth R. Plum	R. Lee Ware
Agriculture	Wendy Gooditis	
Chesapeake	Alfonso H. Lopez	
Natural Resources	Kathy Tran	
Appropriations	Luke Torian	M. Kirkland Cox
Capital Outlay	Cliff Hayes Jr.	
Commerce, Agriculture and Natural Resources	David Bulova	
Compensation and Central Government	Roslyn Tyler	
Elementary and Secondary	Delores McQuinn	
Health and Human Services	Mark Sickles	
Higher Education	Betsy B. Carr	
Transportation and Public Safety	Paul Krizek	
Communications, Technology and Innovation	Cliff Hayes Jr.	Kathy Byron
Communications	Danica Roem	
Technology and Innovation	Hala Ayala	
Counties Cities and Towns	Kaye Kory	Charles Poindexter
Ad Hoc	Kathleen Murphy	
Charters	Danica Roem	
Land Use	Steve Heretick	
Courts of Justice	Charniele Herring	Terry Kilgore
Civil	Jeff Bourne	
Criminal	Michael P. Mullin	
Judicial	Joseph C. Lindsey	
Education	Roslyn Tyler	Mark L. Cole
Post-Secondary and Higher Education	Mark Keam	
Pre-K-12	Lamont Bagby	
SOL and SOQ	Schuyler VanValkenburg	
Finance	Vivian E. Watts	Robert D. Orrock, Sr.
Subcommittee #1	Mark Keam	
Subcommittee #2	Steve Heretick	
Subcommittee #3	Rip Sullivan	
General Laws	David Bulova	Thomas C. Wright, Jr.
ABC/Gaming	Paul Krizek	
Housing/Consumer Protection	Marcus Simon	
Open Government/Procurement	Betsy B. Carr	
Professions/Occupations and Administrative Process Subcommittee	Chris Hurst	
Health, Welfare and Institutions	Mark D. Sickles	Robert D. Orrock, Sr.
Behavioral Health	Marcia Price	
Health Professions	Dawn Adams	
Health	Patrick Hope	
Social Services	Elizabeth Guzman	
Labor and Commerce	Jeion Ward	Terry Kilgore
Subcommittee #1	Lamont Bagby	
Subcommittee #2	Steve Heretick	
Subcommittee #3	Rip Sullivan	
Privileges and Elections	Joe Lindsey	Robert D. Orrock, Sr.
Campaign Finance	David A. Reid	
Constitutional Amendments	Marcus Simon	
Elections	Schuyler VanValkenburg	
Gubernatorial Appointments	Kelly Convirs-Fowler	
Redistricting	Marcus Simon	
Public Safety	Patrick Hope	Thomas C. Wright, Jr.
Firearms	Jeff Bourne	
Public Safety	Mark Levine	
Rules	Eileen Filler-Corn	M. Kirkland Cox
Joint Rules	Eileen Filler-Corn	
Standards of Conduct	N/A	
Studies	Mark Sickles	
Subcommittee #2	N/A	
Transportation	Delores McQuinn	Robert B. Bell
Motor Vehicles	Jay Jones	
Transportation Innovation and General Topics	Karrie Delaney	
Transportation Systems	Betsy B. Carr	
Subcommittee #4	N/A	

== Legislation ==
Pre-filing of bills for the 2020 session began November 18, 2019. 828 bills were passed by the House by crossover day on February 12, 2020, an increase from the 603 bills passed under the Republican majority in the 2019 session.

== Enacted ==
- January 27, 2020: HJ 1/SJ 1: Resolution to ratify the Equal Rights Amendment to the United States Constitution
- February 24, 2020: HB 35/SB 103: Restores parole eligibility to those serving 20 years of a sentence for crimes committed as a juvenile and for which they received a lengthy sentence
- March 4, 2020: HB 245: Repeals the crime of fornication
- March 2, 2020: HB 61: Provides that an adult sentenced for a juvenile offense can earn good conduct credit at the rate of one day for each one day served.
- March 2, 2020: HB 386: Prohibits the performance of conversion therapy by state-licensed counselors on juveniles under 18
- March 2, 2020: HB 587: Requiring the inclusion of space and equipment for changing babies during plans for new state government buildings
- April 11, 2020: SB 868: Virginia Values Act, Prohibits LGBT discrimination in employment, housing, credit, and public accommodations
- HB 277: Allowing currently-incarcerated individuals to earn credit towards paying off fines and fees through community work
- HB 1490: Repealing statutory bans on same-sex marriages and civil unions.
- HB 696: Provides that localities may prohibit discrimination in housing, employment, public accommodations, credit, and education on the basis of sexual orientation and gender identity
- HB 1071: Repeals the crime of profane swearing
- HB 973/SB 600: Repeals several laws enacted from 1901 to 1960 which encoded racial segregation of students in elementary and secondary schools and institutions of higher education in Virginia
- HB 1514/SB 50: Protects hair texture, hair type, and protective hairstyles such as braids, locks, and twists from discrimination (see also: CROWN Act)

=== Other legislation ===
Notable bills filed include:

- HB 1: Legalization of no-excuse absentee voting
- HB 2: Regulates firearms transfers and sales through background checks
- HB 3: Prohibits discrimination in housing on the basis of sexual orientation and gender identity
- HB 4: Legalizes and regulates casino gambling in Virginia through the Virginia Lottery Board
- HB 961: Banning sale and transport of assault weapons and high-capacity magazines
- HB 1625: Repealing Virginia's statewide ban on local governments removing or altering Confederate monuments
- SB 2: Decriminalizing cannabis in Virginia
- SB 601: Eliminating Lee-Jackson Day and making Election Day a state holiday
- SB 240: Red flag law
- HB 177: Joining the National Popular Vote Interstate Compact (consideration moved to 2021 session)

=== Equal Rights Amendment ===
HJ 1, prefiled by Jennifer Carroll Foy, and SJ 1, filed by Jennifer McClellan, will make Virginia the 3rd state since 2017 and the 38th overall necessary to ratify the Equal Rights Amendment (counting the five that have since voted to rescind their ratifications). Both bills were given initial approval, with SJ 1 being approved 28-12 in the Senate and HJ 1 being approved 59-41 in the House, and were passed by the other chamber on January 27. All Democrats and several Republicans in both chambers voted in favor of the resolutions. However, experts and advocates have acknowledged legal uncertainty about the consequences of Virginia's potential ratification, due to the expired deadlines and the five states' purported revocations.

== Events ==
A peaceful protest opposing gun control legislation occurred outside the Virginia State Capitol on January 20, 2020.

== Changes in membership ==
- Del. Chris Collins (R-HD29) resigned on June 28, 2020 to accept an appointment as a judge to Virginia's 26th Judicial District. He was succeeded by Bill Wiley.
- Del. Joseph C. Lindsey (D-HD90) resigned on November 15, 2020 after being appointed to the Norfolk General District Court. He was succeeded by Angelia Williams Graves.
- Del. Jennifer Carroll Foy (D-HD2) resigned on December 12, 2020 to focus on her campaign for governor. She was succeeded by Candi King.
- Senator Ben Chafin (R-SD38) died from COVID-19-related symptoms on January 1, 2021. He was succeeded by Travis Hackworth.

== See also ==
- List of Virginia state legislatures
