= 2015 Virginia Senate election =

- November 3, 2015

All 40 seats in the Senate of Virginia 21 (Note: A majority of 20 is also possible as the Lt. Gov. of Virginia holds a tie-breaker vote.) seats needed for a majority
- Turnout: 1,362,664
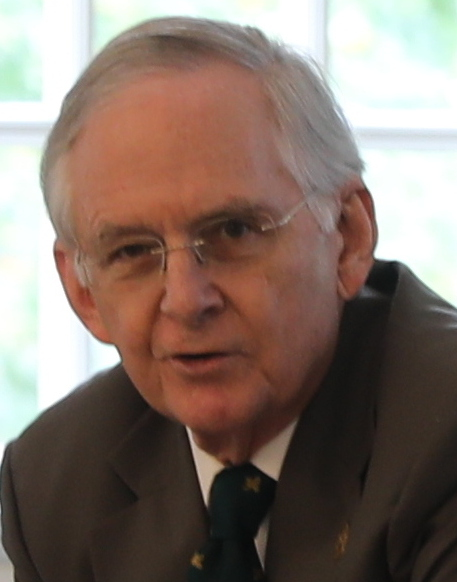

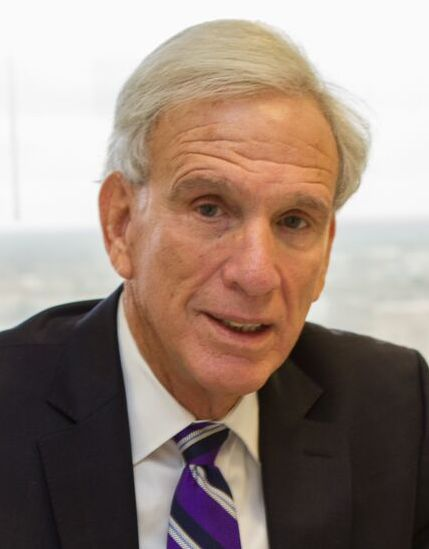
	Majority party	Minority party
Leader	Tommy Norment	Dick Saslaw
Party	Republican	Democratic
Leader since	January 9, 2008	January 10, 1996
Leader's seat	3rd district	35th district
Last election	20	20
Seats before	21	19
Seats won	21	19
Seat change	Steady	Steady
Popular vote	716,331	596,198
Percentage	52.57%	43.75%
Swing	▼2.43pp	▲5.45pp
- Results: Democratic hold Republican hold
Majority leader before election
Tommy Norment
Republican
Elected Majority leader
Tommy Norment
Republican

The 2015 Virginia Senate election was held on November 3, 2015, to elect all 40 members of the Virginia Senate. From January 28 to June 12, 2014, Democrats had held a majority as they won the Lieutenant Governorship in the 2013 elections, but then later lost a seat in a special election, thereby giving Republicans a 21-19 majority. Republicans retained their 21–19 majority in the chamber in the 2015 elections. As of 2023, this is the most recent time that Republicans won a majority in the Senate.

== Previous composition ==
Affiliation	Party (Shading indicates majority caucus)		Total	
Affiliation	Democratic	Republican	Total	Vacant
End of Previous Session (2008–2012)	22	18	40	0
Begin	20	20	40	0
July 3, 2012 (Note: Democrat Yvonne B. Miller (District 5) died.)	19	20	39	1
September 17, 2012 (Note: Democrat Kenny Alexander replaced Miller after September 4 special election.)	20	20	40	0
August 5, 2013 (Note: Republican Harry Blevins (District 14) resigned. Although in theory Democrats had a brief numerical majority, the Senate was not in session. Additionally, rules adopted at the beginning of the 2012 session required a two-thirds supermajority vote to reorganize the Senate mid-session.)	20	19	39	1
August 16, 2013 (Note: Republican John Cosgrove replaced Blevins after August 6 special election.)	20	20	40	0
January 11, 2014 (Note: Democrats Ralph Northam (District 6) and Mark Herring (District 33) resigned upon being inaugurated Lieutenant Governor and Attorney General, respectively.)	18	20	38	2
January 24, 2014 (Note: Democrat Jennifer Wexton elected to succeed Herring.)	19	20	39	1
January 28, 2014 (Note: Democrat Lynwood Lewis replaced Northam after January 7 special election and January 27 recount. After regaining a numerical majority in the Senate, the Democrats voted to change the Senate's rules and reorganize the chamber, putting the Senate back under Democratic control.)	20	20	40	0
June 8, 2014 (Note: Democrat Phillip Puckett (District 38) resigned. Republicans regained effective control and adopted their own rules change effective June 12.)	19	20	39	1
July 2, 2014 (Note: Democrat Henry L. Marsh (District 16) resigned to take a seat on the Alcoholic Beverage Control Board.)	18	20	38	2
August 19, 2014 (Note: Republican Ben Chafin elected to succeed Puckett.)	18	21	39	1
November 4, 2014 (Note: Democrat Rosalyn Dance elected to succeed Marsh.)	19	21	40	0
January 13, 2015 (Note: Republicans Jeffrey McWaters (District 8), John Watkins (District 10), Walter Stosch (District 12) & Ralph K. Smith (District 19) & Democrats Charles Colgan (District 29) & Toddy Puller (District 36) Retiring, Replaced respectively by, Republicans Bill DeSteph, Glen Sturtevant, Siobhan Dunnavant & David Suetterlein & Democrats Jeremy McPike & Scott Surovell, No seats changing party.)	19	21	40	0
Latest voting share	47.5%	52.5%		

=== Summary ===
2015 Virginia Senate election
Party	Candidate	Votes	%	±%
Republican	30 candidates (21 elected)	716,331	52.57%	+0
Democratic	30 candidates (19 elected)	596,198	43.75%	+0
Independent Greens	3 candidates	14,622	1.07%	+0
Independents	4 candidates	12,731	0.93%	+0
Libertarian	1 - Carl Richard Loser	527	0.04%	+0
Write-ins		22,255	1.63%	N/A
Total votes		1,362,664	100.0%	
Republican hold		Swing	0	

== Results by district ==
=== District 1 ===
Virginia Senate, 1st District general election
Party	Candidate	Votes	%
Democratic	John Clifford Miller (incumbent)	17,989	59.3%
Republican	Mark Randolph Matney	12,278	40.5%
Write-ins		69	0.2%
Total votes		30,336	100.0
Democratic hold			

=== District 2 ===
Virginia Senate, 2nd District general election
Party	Candidate	Votes	%
Democratic	Mamie Evelyn Locke (incumbent)	17,459	94.1%
Write-ins		1,087	5.9%
Total votes		18,546	100.0%
Democratic hold			

=== District 3 ===
Virginia Senate, 3rd District general election
Party	Candidate	Votes	%
Republican	Thomas Kent Norment Jr. (incumbent)	35,520	69.5%
Democratic	Hugo Eduardo Reyes	15,432	30.2%
Write-ins		147	0.3%
Total votes		51,099	100.0%
Republican hold			

=== District 4 ===
Virginia Senate, 4th District general election
Party	Candidate	Votes	%
Republican	Ryan Todd McDougle (incumbent)	37,882	96.0%
Write-ins		1,573	4%
Total votes		39,455	100.0%
Republican hold			

=== District 5 ===
Virginia Senate, 5th District general election
Party	Candidate	Votes	%
Democratic	Kenneth Cooper Alexander (incumbent)	13,955	95.4%
Write-ins		668	4.6%
Total votes		14,623	100.0%
Democratic hold			

=== District 6 ===
Virginia Senate, 6th District general election
Party	Candidate	Votes	%
Democratic	Lynwood Wayne Lewis Jr. (incumbent)	16,738	59.5%
Republican	Richard Hooper Ottinger	11,386	40.4%
Write-ins		29	0.1%
Total votes		28,153	100.0%
Democratic hold			

=== District 7 ===
Virginia Senate, 7th District general election
Party	Candidate	Votes	%
Republican	Frank W. Wagner (incumbent)	18,266	53.9%
Democratic	Gary Thomas McCollum	15,434	45.5%
Write-ins		208	0.6%
Total votes		33,908	100.0%
Republican hold			

=== District 8 ===
Virginia Senate, 8th District general election
Party	Candidate	Votes	%
Democratic	Howard David Belote	11,075	40.9%
Republican	Bill R. DeSteph Jr.	15,905	58.7%
Write-ins		106	0.4%
Total votes		27,086	100.0%
Republican hold			

=== District 9 ===
Virginia Senate, 9th District general election
Party	Candidate	Votes	%
Democratic	A. Donald McEachin (incumbent)	31,067	95.0%
Write-ins		1,620	5%
Total votes		32,687	100.0
Democratic hold			

=== District 10 ===
Virginia Senate, 10th District general election
Party	Candidate	Votes	%
Democratic	Daniel Allen Gecker	26,173	47.1%
Republican	Glen Howard Sturtevant Jr.	27,651	49.8%
Independent Greens	Marleen K. Durfee	1,136	2.0%
Libertarian	Carl Richard Loser	527	1.0%
Write-ins		60	0.1%
Republican hold			
Total votes		55,547	100.0%

=== District 11 ===
Virginia Senate, 11th District general election
Party	Candidate	Votes	%
Democratic	Ernest Wayne Powell	15,485	36.2%
Republican	Amanda Freeman Chase	27,218	63.6%
Write-ins		111	0.3%
Total votes		42,814	100.0%
Republican hold			

=== District 12 ===
Virginia Senate, 12th District general election
Party	Candidate	Votes	%
Democratic	Deborah M. Repp	16,797	38.0%
Republican	Siobhan Stolle Dunnavant	25,504	57.6%
Independent	Robert Scott Johnson	1,881	4.3%
Write-ins		65	0.1%
Total votes		44,247	100.0%
Republican hold			

=== District 13 ===
Virginia Senate, 13th District general election
Party	Candidate	Votes	%
Republican	R. H. Black (incumbent)	25,898	52.3%
Democratic	Barbra Jill McCabe	23,544	47.5%
Write-ins		84	0.2%
Total votes		49,526	100.0
Republican hold			

=== District 14 ===
Virginia Senate, 14th District general election
Party	Candidate	Votes	%
Republican	J. A. Cosgrove Jr. (incumbent)	15,371	92.4%
Write-ins		1,266	7.6%
Total votes		16,637	100.0
Republican hold			

=== District 15 ===
Virginia Senate, 15th District general election
Party	Candidate	Votes	%
Republican	Frank Miller Ruff Jr. (incumbent)	32,745	98.3%
Write-ins		572	1.7%
Total votes		33,317	100.0%
Republican hold			

=== District 16 ===
Virginia Senate, 16th District general election
Party	Candidate	Votes	%
Democratic	Rosalyn Randolph Dance (incumbent)	17,331	72.7%
Independent	Joseph D. Morrissey	6,090	25.5%
Write-ins		428	1.8%
Total votes		23,849	100.0
Democratic hold			

=== District 17 ===
Virginia Senate, 17th District general election
Party	Candidate	Votes	%
Republican	Bryce E. Reeves (incumbent)	24,519	62.1%
Democratic	Ned Lee Gallaway	14,915	37.8%
Write-ins		53	0.1%
Total votes		39,487	100.0%
Republican hold			

=== District 18 ===
Virginia Senate, 18th District general election
Party	Candidate	Votes	%
Democratic	Lillie Louise Boone Lucas (incumbent)	20,321	95.6%
Write-ins		942	4.4%
Total votes		21,263	100.0%
Democratic hold			

=== District 19 ===
Virginia Senate, 19th District general election
Party	Candidate	Votes	%
Democratic	Michael Lawrence Hamlar	15,738	30.8%
Republican	David Robert Suetterlein	33,120	64.9%
Independent	Steven Lee Nelson	2,134	4.2%
Write-ins		71	0.1%
Total votes		51,063	100.0%
Republican hold			

=== District 20 ===
Virginia Senate, 20th District general election
Party	Candidate	Votes	%
Republican	William Martin Stanley Jr. (incumbent)	22,701	57.9%
Democratic	Kimberly Elliott Adkins	16,455	42.0%
Write-ins		67	0.2%
Total votes		39,223	100.0%
Republican hold			

=== District 21 ===
Virginia Senate, 21st District general election
Party	Candidate	Votes	%
Democratic	John Saul Edwards (incumbent)	20,881	50.9%
Republican	Nancy Vivian Dye	17,438	42.5%
Independent	Donald Stevens Caldwell	2,626	6.4%
Write-ins		42	0.1%
Total votes		40,987	100.0%
Democratic hold			

=== District 22 ===
Virginia Senate, 22nd District general election
Party	Candidate	Votes	%
Republican	Thomas A. Garrett Jr. (incumbent)	24,913	95.3%
Write-ins		1,219	4.7%
Total votes		26,132	100.0%
Republican hold			

=== District 23 ===
Virginia Senate, 23rd District general election
Party	Candidate	Votes	%
Republican	Stephen Dwayne Newman (incumbent)	27,309	96.7%
Write-ins		923	3.3%
Total votes		28,232	100.0%
Republican hold			

=== District 24 ===
Virginia Senate, 24th District general election
Party	Candidate	Votes	%
Republican	Emmett Wilson Hanger Jr. (incumbent)	34,980	97.9%
Write-ins		765	2.1%
Total votes		35,745	100.0%
Republican hold			

=== District 25 ===
Virginia Senate, 25th District general election
Party	Candidate	Votes	%
Democratic	Robert Creigh Deeds (incumbent)	34,419	97.2%
Write-ins		984	2.8%
Total votes		35,403	100.0%
Democratic hold			

=== District 26 ===
Virginia Senate, 26th District general election
Party	Candidate	Votes	%
Republican	Mark Dudley Obenshain (incumbent)	25,042	68.7%
Democratic	April Dorothea Moore	11,308	31.0%
Write-ins		89	0.2%
Total votes		36,439	100.0
Republican hold			

=== District 27 ===
Virginia Senate, 27th District general election
Party	Candidate	Votes	%
Republican	Jill Holtzman Vogel (incumbent)	34,203	97.3%
Write-ins		964	2.7%
Total votes		35,167	100.0%
Republican hold			

=== District 28 ===
Virginia Senate, 28th District general election
Party	Candidate	Votes	%
Republican	Richard Henry Stuart Sr. (incumbent)	30,187	95.4%
Write-ins		1,446	4.6%
Total votes		31,633	100.0%
Republican hold			

=== District 29 ===
Virginia Senate, 29th District general election
Party	Candidate	Votes	%
Democratic	Jeremy Scott McPike	16,489	53.7%
Republican	Harry "Hal" Jacob Parrish, II	14,131	46.1%
Write-ins		60	0.2%
Total votes		30,680	100.0%
Democratic hold			

=== District 30 ===
Virginia Senate, 30th District general election
Party	Candidate	Votes	%
Democratic	Adam Paul Ebbin (incumbent)	27,274	76.7%
Independent Greens	James Ronald Fisher	7,431	20.9%
Write-ins		842	2.4%
Total votes		35,547	100.0%
Democratic hold			

=== District 31 ===
Virginia Senate, 31st District general election
Party	Candidate	Votes	%
Democratic	Barbara Ann Favola (incumbent)	26,373	62.3%
Republican	George Forakis	15,904	37.5%
Write-ins		81	0.2%
Total votes		42,358	100.0%
Democratic hold			

=== District 32 ===
Virginia Senate, 32nd District general election
Party	Candidate	Votes	%
Democratic	Janet Denison Howell (incumbent)	31,156	94.0%
Write-ins		1,974	6%
Total votes		33,130	100.0%
Democratic hold			

=== District 33 ===
Virginia Senate, 33rd District general election
Party	Candidate	Votes	%
Democratic	Jennifer Tosini Wexton (incumbent)	18,577	56.6%
Republican	Stephen Bartholomew Hollingshead	14,190	43.2%
Write-ins		59	0.2%
Total votes		32,826	100.0%
Democratic hold			

=== District 34 ===
Virginia Senate, 34th District general election
Party	Candidate	Votes	%
Democratic	John Chapman "Chap" Petersen (incumbent)	27,690	93.6%
Write-ins		1,881	6.4%
Total votes		29,571	100.0%
Democratic hold			

=== District 35 ===
Virginia Senate, 35th District general election
Party	Candidate	Votes	%
Democratic	Richard Lawrence Saslaw (incumbent)	18,754	74.4%
Independent Greens	Terrence Wayne Modglin	6,055	24%
Write-ins		383	1.5%
Total votes		25,192	100.0%
Democratic hold			

=== District 36 ===
Virginia Senate, 36th District general election
Party	Candidate	Votes	%
Democratic	Scott A. Surovell	18,320	60.5%
Republican	Gerald Moodrow Foreman, II	11,890	39.3%
Write-ins		62	0.2%
Total votes		30,272	100.0%
Democratic hold			

=== District 37 ===
Virginia Senate, 37th District general election
Party	Candidate	Votes	%
Democratic	David William Marsden (incumbent)	18,966	55.4%
Republican	David Michael Bergman	15,216	44.5%
Write-ins		38	0.1%
Total votes		34,220	100.0%
Democratic hold			

=== District 38 ===
Virginia Senate, 38th District general election
Party	Candidate	Votes	%
Republican	Augustus Benton Chafin Jr. (incumbent)	31,025	98.3%
Write-ins		537	1.7%
Total votes		31,562	100.0%
Republican hold			

=== District 39 ===
Virginia Senate, 39th District general election
Party	Candidate	Votes	%
Democratic	George L. Barker (incumbent)	20,083	53.9%
Republican	Joseph "Joe" Robert Murray	17,101	45.9%
Write-ins		85	0.2%
Total votes		37,269	100.0%
Democratic hold			

=== District 40 ===
Virginia Senate, 40th District general election
Party	Candidate	Votes	%
Republican	C. W. "Bill" Carrico (incumbent)	36,838	98.4%
Write-ins		595	1.6%
Total votes		37,433	100.0%
Republican hold			

== See also ==
- 2015 Virginia House of Delegates election
- 2015 Virginia elections
