= List of Virginia state legislatures =

The legislature of the U.S. state of Virginia has convened many times since statehood became effective on June 25, 1788.

== Legislatures ==
Name	Session details	Last election
Virginia Constitution of 1776
1776 Virginia General Assembly		
1777–1778 Virginia General Assembly		
1778 Virginia General Assembly		
1779 Virginia General Assembly		
1780–1781 Virginia General Assembly		
1781–1782 Virginia General Assembly		
1782 Virginia General Assembly		
1783 Virginia General Assembly		
1784–1785 Virginia General Assembly		
1785–1786 Virginia General Assembly		
1786–1787 Virginia General Assembly		
1787–1788 Virginia General Assembly		
1788 Virginia General Assembly	June 23, 1788 - June 30, 1788; October 20, 1788 - December 30, 1788	1788
1789 Virginia General Assembly	October 19, 1789 - December 19, 1789	1789
1790 Virginia General Assembly	October 18, 1790 - December 29, 1790	1790
1791 Virginia General Assembly	October 17, 1791 - December 20, 1791	1791
1792 Virginia General Assembly	October 1, 1792 - December 28, 1792	1792
1793 Virginia General Assembly	October 21, 1793 - December 12, 1793	1793
1794 Virginia General Assembly	November 11, 1794 - December 27, 1794	1794
1795 Virginia General Assembly	November 10, 1795 - December 29, 1795	1795
1796 Virginia General Assembly	November 8, 1796 - December 27, 1796	1796
1797–1798 Virginia General Assembly	December 4, 1797 - January 25, 1798	1797
1798–1799 Virginia General Assembly	December 3, 1798 - January 26, 1799	1798
1799–1800 Virginia General Assembly	December 2, 1799 - January 28, 1800	1799
1800–1801 Virginia General Assembly	December 1, 1800 - January 23, 1801	1800
1801–1802 Virginia General Assembly	December 7, 1801 - February 2, 1802	1801
1802–1803 Virginia General Assembly	December 6, 1802 - January 29, 1803	1802
1803–1804 Virginia General Assembly	December 5, 1803 - February 3, 1804	1803
1804–1805 Virginia General Assembly	December 3, 1804 - February 1, 1805	1804
1805–1806 Virginia General Assembly	December 2, 1805 - February 6, 1806	1805
1806–1807 Virginia General Assembly	December 1, 1806 - January 22, 1807	1806
1807–1808 Virginia General Assembly	December 7, 1807 - February 10, 1808	1807
1808–1809 Virginia General Assembly	December 5, 1808 - February 18, 1809	1808
1809–1810 Virginia General Assembly	December 4, 1809 - February 9, 1810	1809
1810–1811 Virginia General Assembly	December 3, 1810 - February 14, 1811	1810
1811–1812 Virginia General Assembly	December 2, 1811 - February 21, 1812	1811
1812–1813 Virginia General Assembly	November 30, 1812 - February 23, 1813	1812
1813–1814 Virginia General Assembly	May 17, 1813 - May 26, 1813; December 6, 1813 - February 16, 1814	1813
1814–1815 Virginia General Assembly	October 10, 1814 - January 19, 1815	1814
1815–1816 Virginia General Assembly	December 4, 1815 - February 28, 1816	1815
1816–1817 Virginia General Assembly	November 11, 1816 - February 22, 1817	1816
1817–1818 Virginia General Assembly	December 1, 1817 - February 26, 1818	1817
1818–1819 Virginia General Assembly	December 7, 1818 - March 13, 1819	1818
1819–1820 Virginia General Assembly	December 6, 1819 - February 25, 1820	1819
1820–1821 Virginia General Assembly	December 4, 1820 - March 6, 1821	1820
1821–1822 Virginia General Assembly	December 3, 1821 - March 4, 1822	1821
1822–1823 Virginia General Assembly	December 2, 1822 - February 25, 1823	1822
1823–1824 Virginia General Assembly	December 1, 1823 - March 10, 1824	1823
1824–1825 Virginia General Assembly	November 29, 1824 - February 18, 1825	1824
1825–1826 Virginia General Assembly	December 5, 1825 - March 9, 1826	1825
1826–1827 Virginia General Assembly	December 4, 1826 - March 9, 1827	1826
1827–1828 Virginia General Assembly	December 3, 1827 - March 1, 1828	1827
1828–1829 Virginia General Assembly	December 1, 1828 - February 28, 1829	1828
1829–1830 Virginia General Assembly	December 7, 1829 - February 23, 1830	1829
Virginia Constitution of 1830
1830–1831 Virginia General Assembly	December 6, 1830 - April 19, 1831	1830
1831–1832 Virginia General Assembly	December 5, 1831 - March 21, 1832	1831
1832–1833 Virginia General Assembly	December 3, 1832 - March 9, 1833	1832
1833–1834 Virginia General Assembly	December 2, 1833 - March 14, 1834	1833
1834–1835 Virginia General Assembly	December 1, 1834 - March 12, 1835	1834
1835–1836 Virginia General Assembly	December 7, 1835 - March 24, 1836	1835
1836–1837 Virginia General Assembly	December 5, 1836 - March 31, 1837; June 12, 1837 - June 24, 1837	1836
1838 Virginia General Assembly	January 1, 1838 - April 9, 1838	1837
1839 Virginia General Assembly	January 7, 1839 - April 10, 1839	1838
1839–1840 Virginia General Assembly	December 2, 1839 - March 19, 1840	1839
1840–1841 Virginia General Assembly	December 1, 1840 - March 22, 1841	1840
1841–1842 Virginia General Assembly	December 6, 1841 - March 26, 1842	1841
1842–1843 Virginia General Assembly	December 5, 1842 - March 28, 1843	1842
1843–1844 Virginia General Assembly	December 4, 1843 - February 15, 1844	1843
1844–1845 Virginia General Assembly	December 2, 1844 - February 22, 1845	1844
1845–1846 Virginia General Assembly	December 1, 1845 - March 6, 1846	1845
1846–1847 Virginia General Assembly	December 7, 1846 - March 23, 1847	1846
1847–1848 Virginia General Assembly	December 6, 1847 - April 5, 1848	1847
1848–1849 Virginia General Assembly	December 4, 1848 - March 19, 1849; May 28, 1849 - August 17, 1849	1848
1849–1850 Virginia General Assembly	December 3, 1849 - March 22, 1850	1849
1850–1851 Virginia General Assembly	December 2, 1850 - March 31, 1851	1850
Virginia Constitution of 1851
1852–1853 Virginia General Assembly	January 12, 1852 - June 7, 1852; November 22, 1852 - April 11, 1853	1851
1853–1854 Virginia General Assembly	December 5, 1853 - March 4, 1854	1853
1855–1856 Virginia General Assembly	December 3, 1855 - March 19, 1856	1855
1857–1858 Virginia General Assembly	December 7, 1857 - March 6, 1858	1857
1859–1861 Virginia General Assembly	December 5, 1859 - April 2, 1860; January 7, 1861 - April 4, 1861	1859
1861–1863 Virginia General Assembly	December 2, 1861 - March 31, 1862; April 1, 1862 - May 19, 1862; September 15, 1862 - October 6, 1862; January 7, 1863 - March 31, 1863	1861
1863–1865 Virginia General Assembly	September 7, 1863 - November 2, 1863; December 7, 1863 - March 10, 1864; December 7, 1864 - March 15, 1865	
Virginia Constitution of 1864
1865–1867 Virginia General Assembly	December 4, 1865 - March 3, 1866; December 3, 1868 - March 2, 1867; March 4, 1867 - April 29, 1867	1865
1869–1871 Virginia General Assembly	October 5, 1869 - October 20, 1869; February 8, 1870 - July 11, 1870; October 1, 1870 - November 10, 1870; December 7, 1870 - March 31, 1871	
Virginia Constitution of 1870
1871–1873 Virginia General Assembly	December 6, 1871 - March 26, 1872; March 27, 1872 - April 5, 1872; December 4, 1872 - April 2, 1873	1871
1874–1875 Virginia General Assembly	January 1, 1874 - April 30, 1874; December 2, 1874 - March 31, 1875	1873
1875–1877 Virginia General Assembly	December 1, 1875 - March 29, 1876; December 6, 1876 - April 4, 1877	1875
1877–1879 Virginia General Assembly	December 5, 1877 - March 14, 1878; December 4, 1878 - April 2, 1879	1877
1879–1880 Virginia General Assembly	December 3, 1879 - March 9, 1880	1879
1881–1882 Virginia General Assembly	December 7, 1881 - March 6, 1882; March 7, 1882 - April 22, 1882	1881
1883–1884 Virginia General Assembly	December 5, 1883 - March 19, 1884; August 13, 1884 - December 1, 1884	1883
1885–1887 Virginia General Assembly	December 2, 1885 - March 6, 1886; March 16, 1887 - May 24, 1887	1885
1887–1888 Virginia General Assembly	December 7, 1887 - March 5, 1888	1887
1889–1890 Virginia General Assembly	December 4, 1889 - March 6, 1890	November 1889
1891–1892 Virginia General Assembly	December 2, 1891 - March 4, 1892	November 1891
1893–1894 Virginia General Assembly	December 6, 1893 - March 8, 1894	November 1893
1895–1896 Virginia General Assembly	December 4, 1895 - March 5, 1896	November 1895
1897–1898 Virginia General Assembly	December 1, 1897 - March 4, 1898	November 1897
1899–1900 Virginia General Assembly	December 6, 1899 - March 7, 1900	November 1899
1901–1904 Virginia General Assembly		November 1901
Virginia Constitution of 1902
1904-1905 Virginia General Assembly	January 13, 1904 - March 15, 1904	1903
1906-1907 Virginia General Assembly	January 10, 1906 - March 15, 1906	1905
1908-1909 Virginia General Assembly	January 8, 1908 - March 27, 1908	1907
1910-1911 Virginia General Assembly	January 12, 1910 - March 17, 1910	1909
1912-1913 Virginia General Assembly	January 10, 1912 - March 15, 1912	1911
1914-1915 Virginia General Assembly	January 14, 1914 - March 20, 1914; January 13, 1915 - March 19, 1915	1913
1916-1917 Virginia General Assembly	January 12, 1916 - March 18, 1916	1915
1918-1919 Virginia General Assembly	January 9, 1918 - March 22, 1918; 1919	1917
1920-1921 Virginia General Assembly		1919
1922-1923 Virginia General Assembly		1921
1924-1925 Virginia General Assembly		1923
1926-1927 Virginia General Assembly		1925
1928-1929 Virginia General Assembly		1927
1930-1931 Virginia General Assembly		1929
1932-1933 Virginia General Assembly		1931
1934-1935 Virginia General Assembly		1933
1936-1937 Virginia General Assembly		1935
1938-1939 Virginia General Assembly		1937
1940-1941 Virginia General Assembly		1939
1942-1943 Virginia General Assembly		1941
1944-1945 Virginia General Assembly		1943
1946-1947 Virginia General Assembly		1945
1948-1949 Virginia General Assembly		November 1947
1950-1951 Virginia General Assembly		1949
1952-1953 Virginia General Assembly		November 1951
1954-1955 Virginia General Assembly		1953
1956-1957 Virginia General Assembly		1955
1958-1959 Virginia General Assembly		1957
1960-1961 Virginia General Assembly		1959
1962-1963 Virginia General Assembly		1961
1964-1965 Virginia General Assembly		1963
1966-1967 Virginia General Assembly		1965
1968-1969 Virginia General Assembly		1967
1970-1971 Virginia General Assembly		1969
1972-1973 Virginia General Assembly		November 1971: Senate
1974-1975 Virginia General Assembly		1973
1976-1977 Virginia General Assembly		November 1975: Senate
1978-1979 Virginia General Assembly		1977
1980-1981 Virginia General Assembly		November 1979: Senate
1982-1983 Virginia General Assembly		November 1981: House
1984-1985 Virginia General Assembly		November 1983: Senate
1986-1987 Virginia General Assembly		November 1985: House
1988-1989 Virginia General Assembly		November 1987: House, Senate
1990-1991 Virginia General Assembly		November 1989: House
1992-1993 Virginia General Assembly		November 1991: House, Senate
1994-1995 Virginia General Assembly		November 1993: House
1996-1997 Virginia General Assembly		November 1995: House, Senate
1998-1999 Virginia General Assembly		November 1997: House
2000-2001 Virginia General Assembly		November 1999: House, Senate
2002-2003 Virginia General Assembly		November 2001: House
2004-2005 Virginia General Assembly		November 2003: House
2006-2007 Virginia General Assembly		November 2005: House
2008-2009 Virginia General Assembly		November 2007: House
2010-2011 Virginia General Assembly	January 13 to March 13, 2010; January 12-February 27, April 6, June 9-July 29, 2011	November 2009: House
2012-2013 Virginia General Assembly	January 11-March 10, 2012; January 9-February 25, 2013	November 2011: House
2014-2015 Virginia General Assembly	January 8-March 10, 2014; January 14-February 28, 2015	November 2013: House
2016-2017 Virginia General Assembly	January 13-March 11, 2016; January 11-February 25, 2017	November 2015: House, Senate
2018-2019 Virginia General Assembly	January 10-March 10, 2018; January 9-February 24, 2019	November 2017: House
2020-2021 Virginia General Assembly	January 8-March 12, 2020; January 13-February 8, 2021	November 2019: House, Senate
2022-2023 Virginia General Assembly	January 12, 2022-2023	November 2021: House
2024-2025 Virginia General Assembly	January 10, 2024-March 9 2024 January 8, 2025-February 22, 2025	November 7, 2023: House, Senate
2026-2027 Virginia General Assembly	January 14, 2026-March 14, 2026	November 4, 2025: House

== See also ==
- List of speakers of the Virginia House of Delegates
- List of presidents pro tempore of the Senate of Virginia
- List of governors of Virginia
- Virginia State Capitol
- Historical outline of Virginia
- Lists of United States state legislative sessions
