= 2019 Virginia political crisis =

Scandals of US state executive officials

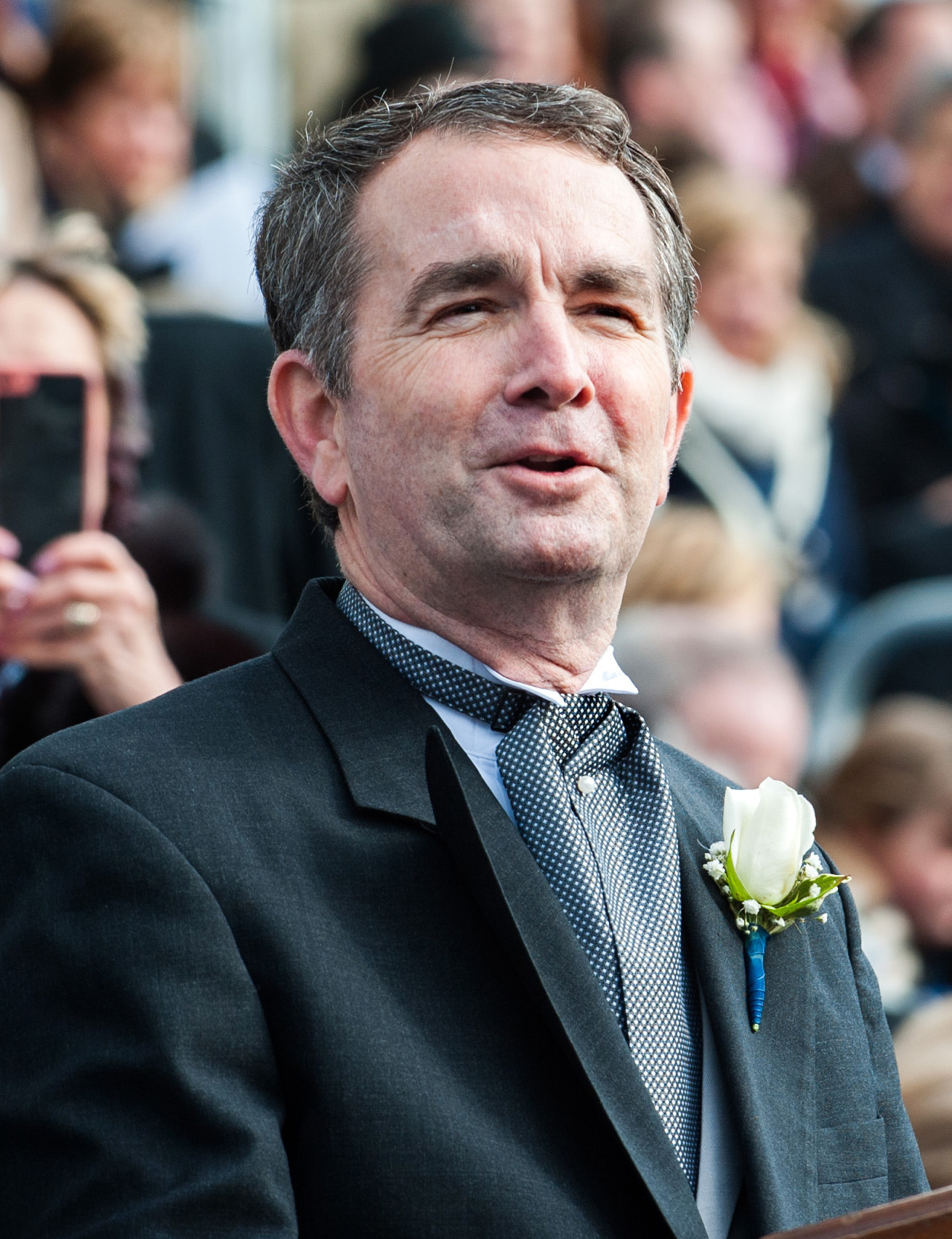
Governor Ralph Northam

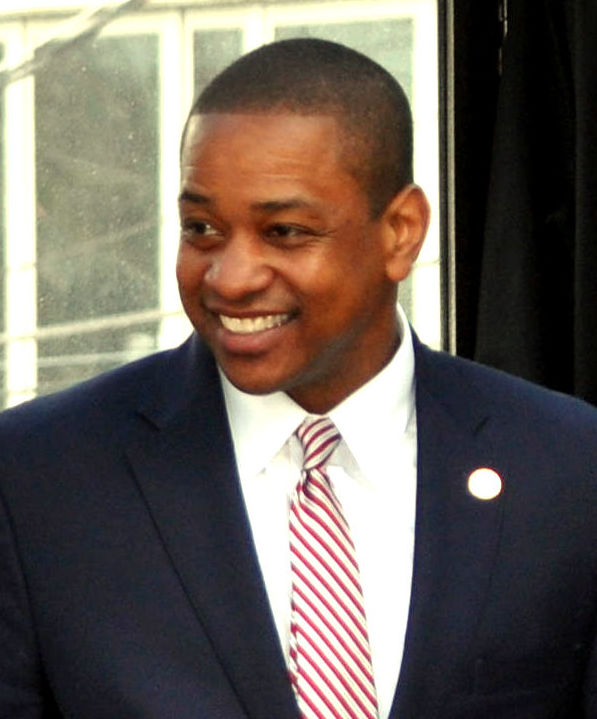
Lieutenant Governor Justin Fairfax

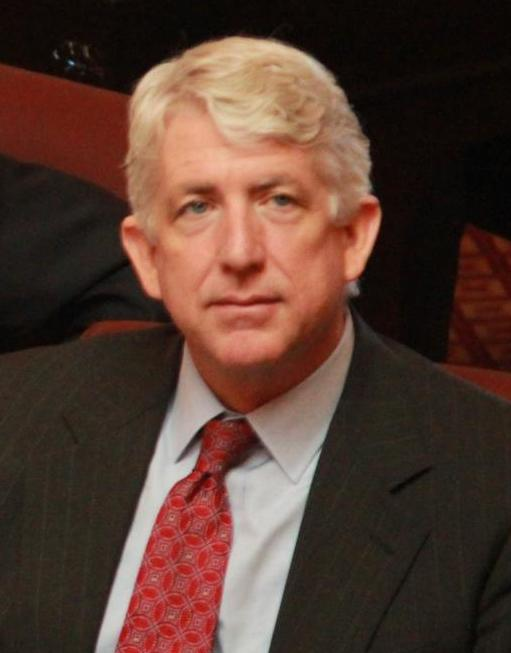
Attorney General Mark Herring

Over the course of one week in February 2019, all three of Virginia's statewide elected executive officials (all members of the Democratic Party) became engulfed in scandal, and were consequently the subjects of nationwide bipartisan calls for resignation or removal from office.

The crisis began when a photo surfaced of Governor Ralph Northam's page in his 1984 medical school yearbook, which included a photo of two people, one in blackface and one in a Ku Klux Klan outfit. Northam had sparked a national outcry two days earlier over comments interpreted by conservatives and anti-abortion groups as supporting infanticide. Amid widespread calls for Northam's resignation, Lieutenant Governor Justin Fairfax had multiple sexual assault allegations raised against him dating to 2000 and 2004. Attorney General Mark Herring revealed shortly thereafter that he had also worn blackface while in college.

The issues raised together created a crisis in Virginia as all three statewide officials were engulfed in scandal over the span of a few days and the potential of all three resigning or being forced out of office became apparent. It also forced Democrats to grapple with racial and sexual assault scandals within their own party.

Although the approval ratings of Northam and Herring largely recovered by the end of their terms in office, all three figures involved in the crisis were replaced with Republicans after the next elections in 2021.

Northam was term-limited. Fairfax chose to run for governor in 2021, but lost the primary to former governor Terry McAuliffe, receiving 3.56% of the vote and placing fourth in a 5-way election. Herring, the Attorney General, was defeated in his bid for reelection by delegate Jason Miyares.

In 2026, Fairfax was found dead in his house alongside his wife in an apparent murder–suicide case.

== Background ==
Given the racially charged nature of the scandals, national media focused attention on Virginia's complicated history with race. Virginia had been a corner of the Atlantic slave trade triangle, and had a leading role in the Confederate States of America. Its history has featured Monument Avenue, Massive Resistance, and the first elected African American state governor in US history, Douglas Wilder. More recently, Virginia voted for Barack Obama in 2008 and 2012, and was the site of the white supremacist Unite the Right rally in 2017.

Virginia has had two Democratic senators since 2009 and Democrats had controlled all three statewide offices since 2014. The 2017 elections had been contentious and close, leading to Democrats maintaining control of all three statewide offices while Republicans clung to a 51-49 majority in the Virginia House of Delegates and a 21-19 majority in the Virginia Senate.

== Positions affected ==
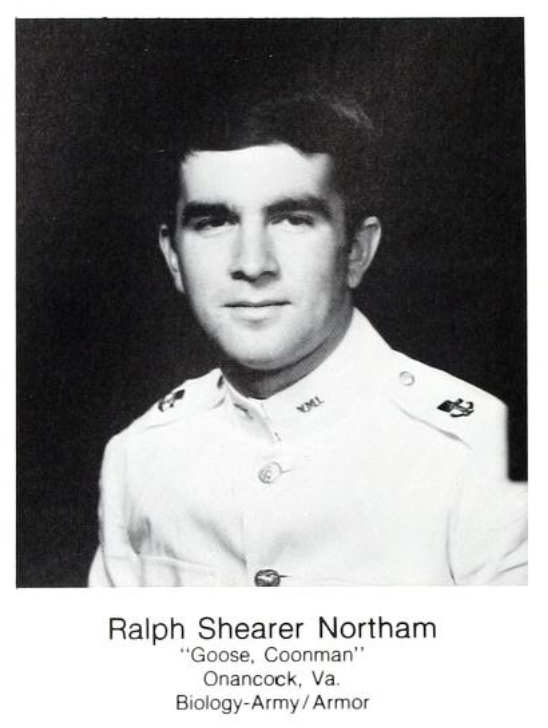
Northam's 1981 VMI yearbook photograph showing the nickname, "Coonman"

The situation involved the position of the Governor of Virginia, as well as the two positions (Lieutenant Governor and Attorney General) that directly follow in the gubernatorial order of succession, with widespread bipartisan calls for resignations having the potential for a state constitutional crisis.

=== Ralph Northam ===
On January 30, Northam had made controversial comments about abortion during a WTOP interview about the Repeal Act, where he stated that if a severely deformed or otherwise non-viable fetus was born after an unsuccessful abortion attempt, "the infant would be resuscitated if that's what the mother and the family desired, and then a discussion would ensue between the physicians and the mother." The comments sparked an outcry as conservative politicians and media figures characterized Northam's comments as promoting infanticide. After the yearbook photo was publicized, many conservative media outlets compared the two controversies and described them as a "bad week" for the governor.

On February 1, 2019, images from Northam's medical school yearbook were published on the right wing website Big League Politics. The photos showed an image of an unidentified person in blackface and an unidentified person in a Ku Klux Klan hood on Northam's page in the yearbook. Northam later said he is "99 percent sure" of who the people on his yearbook page are. A spokesman for Eastern Virginia Medical School confirmed that the image appeared in its 1984 yearbook.

According to The Washington Post, the photo was sent as a tip to Big League Politics by one or more medical school classmates who were concerned about Northam's abortion comments. Shortly after the news broke, Northam apologized for appearing in the photo.

Separately, a 1981 yearbook from the Virginia Military Institute (VMI) listed "Coonman" as one of Northam's nicknames, interpreted as a racial slur. The following day, Northam held a press conference in which he reversed his stance and denied that he appeared in the 1984 photo, but did admit to having "darkened [his] face" with shoe polish as part of a Michael Jackson costume around the same time. Northam said only two people at VMI had referred to him as "Coonman", and that he regretted its inclusion in the yearbook.

Reaction to the press conference was intensely negative and calls for Northam's resignation continued. The 1984 yearbook photo also brought renewed attention to a 2013 video clip in which Northam appeared unwilling to shake hands with his African-American opponent for lieutenant governor, E. W. Jackson, after a debate, though it was possible Northam did not see Jackson extending his hand. Northam evaded the media for several months in the aftermath of the revelations.

A months-long investigation into the photo that appeared in the 1984 Eastern Virginia Medical School yearbook could not conclusively determine who was in the photo or how the image ended up there. A team hired by EVMS released a 55-page report on May 22, 2019, saying: "We could not conclusively determine the identity of either individual depicted in the photograph." McGuireWoods contacted over 80 people connected to the school, including five members of their yearbook staff at the time.

=== Justin Fairfax ===
Fairfax was preparing for Northam to resign, even going so far as to notify family that as the next man in the line of succession he was about to replace Northam as governor, when Big League Politics reported on February 3 that Fairfax had been accused by Vanessa C. Tyson, an associate professor at Scripps College and fellow at Stanford University, of sexual assault at a hotel at the 2004 Democratic National Convention in Boston. Fairfax denied the accusation, saying his encounter with Tyson was consensual and the timing of the reports was intended to smear him as he was about to ascend to the governorship.

Fairfax also insinuated that supporters of Northam, or someone connected with Richmond mayor Levar Stoney, a potential political rival since both were speculated as possible Democratic candidates for governor in 2021, may have been behind the allegation going public. A few days later, Tyson released a statement publicly detailing her allegations. Tyson said she is a Democrat with no political agenda and felt compelled to release the statement because Fairfax "has tried to brand me as a liar to a national audience, in service to his political ambitions, and has threatened litigation."

On February 8, a second woman, Meredith Watson, came forward with sexual assault allegations against Fairfax, alleging that he raped her in a "premeditated and aggressive" attack in 2000 when both were undergraduate students at Duke University. The second accusation led to a cascade of calls from fellow Democrats from Virginia and around the country for Fairfax to resign. Delegate Patrick Hope, a Democrat, said he would initiate impeachment proceedings against Fairfax if he did not resign within three days, but backed off the threat amid concerns from fellow Democratic state legislators.

=== Mark Herring ===
On February 6, Herring, who had already called on Northam to resign, issued a statement in which he admitted to wearing blackface himself as a 19-year-old University of Virginia student, saying he was trying to look like rapper Kurtis Blow at a party. The scandal added to the tumult that now engulfed the entire executive branch of Virginia's government. Herring's revelation led to a pause in the demands for resignation as Democrats and many Republicans were unsure of how to react to the expanding crisis.

== Response and demands for resignations ==
=== Immediate response ===
Northam faced widespread calls for resignation, including from Kamala Harris and other would-be 2020 Democratic presidential candidates, as well as from Virginia's Democratic U.S. Senators, Mark Warner and Tim Kaine. Before facing scandals of their own, Herring issued a call for Northam to resign and Fairfax called for Northam to "do what was best for the state".

A wide list of state and national politicians, activists, and public figures called for Northam's resignation. Among them was Representative Karen Bass, chair of the Congressional Black Caucus, who stated: "We now know what Ralph Northam did when he thought no one was watching. The person in that photo can't be trusted to lead. Governor Northam must resign immediately." State leaders and organizations such as Congressman Donald McEachin, former Congressman Scott Taylor, the ACLU of Virginia, the NAACP, the Richmond Times-Dispatch, the mayor of Richmond Levar Stoney and the chairman of the Virginia Black legislative caucus, delegate Lamont Bagby all called on Northam to resign, and this call transcended party lines as both the Virginia House Democrats and the Virginia GOP demanded resignation. Nationally, figures such as Hillary Clinton, Nancy Pelosi, Tom Steyer, and Chuck Schumer all made statements admonishing Northam's actions and asking for an apology and a leave of his position.

In a joint statement, Senator Warner, Senator Kaine, and Representative Bobby Scott issued a joint statement including the assertion that "After [they] watched his press conference today, [they] called Governor Northam to tell him that [they] no longer believe[d] he can effectively serve as Governor of Virginia and that he must resign." Though he was asked to resign formally by the Democratic National Committee, several local black and Democratic figures said they did not think he should resign, including Jim Moran, John Boyd, and Northam's pastor, Rev. Kelvin Jones.

Democrats' response to the allegations against Fairfax and Herring's admission was more subdued, testing whether Democrats would apply the same zero-tolerance standards they applied in other previous cases. Some state politicians held off on calling for Herring's resignation, as they were concerned about the risk of losing Democratic control of the executive branch in Virginia. US Democratic Virginia Representatives Don Beyer and Jennifer Wexton were vocal in their calls for Northam and Fairfax to resign and did not make a similar call for Herring's resignation. In a statement responding to questions about why they excluded Herring, Wexton stated that he "came forward proactively, is very regretful and contrite."

Following the claims, Fairfax resigned as partner of the Richmond law firm Morrison and Foerster following a leave of absence. He filed a $400 million lawsuit in early September 2019 against CBS for defamation over interviews with his accusers, which was later dismissed by a federal judge. A lawsuit was also filed against Fairfax titled Judicial Watch et al. v Justin E. Fairfax et al. regarding the Freedom of Information Act after staff in Fairfax's office refused to disclose records to the group.

After the first full week in February, Northam and Herring were both adamant in their refusal to resign, while Democratic Delegate Patrick Hope indicated he was initiating impeachment proceedings against Fairfax. This opened up the possibility that two white men accused of blackface would maintain their terms while an African American man would face impeachment and removal for unproven accusations. Given the optics of this situation, many leaders in Virginia softened their stances on resignation for any of the three statewide elected officials.

=== Line of succession ===
According to the Virginia Constitution, if the governor resigned, his lieutenant governor would replace him. If the lieutenant governor were unable to replace the governor, the attorney general would become governor. The Speaker of the House – who at the time of the scandals was Kirk Cox, a Republican – was fourth in the line of succession and would have become governor if all three had resigned or had been removed. (Cox stated, "I have never been in blackface, unequivocal.")

In the immediate aftermath of the Northam yearbook story, speculation was rampant that Northam would resign; Fairfax even began making preparations to become governor. Many Democrats were enthusiastic about the idea of Fairfax, who would be the state's second black governor, replacing Northam. But the allegations against Fairfax and Herring's revelation gave Northam breathing room and caused Democrats to pause to ponder their next steps. Democrats were "conscious that if all three executives had to step down at once," a Republican would become governor.

Virginia's Constitution had no clear provision for replacing the lieutenant governor if Fairfax were to resign, potentially leading to a political fight over how to replace him, but a catch-all clause in the constitution governing filling vacancies would have given the governor power to appoint a new lieutenant governor to serve until a special election would have been held during the November general election to choose someone to serve the remainder of the term, which ended in January 2022.

== Other aspects ==
Then-Senate Majority Leader Tommy Norment, a Republican, was caught up in the scandal when it was reported that he was listed as managing editor of a 1968 Virginia Military Institute yearbook that featured racially charged language and photos of people in blackface. Norment does not appear in any of the photos and issued a statement saying he condemned the use of blackface and said his role was ensuring writers and photographers made their submissions on time and that he was "still culpable, but it is by association with a team that produced that yearbook with those photos". Norment pointed out that page 236 of the same yearbook shows he supported the racial integration of VMI in 1968, and led an effort to enroll women there in 1997.
