= Patrick Howley =

American journalist

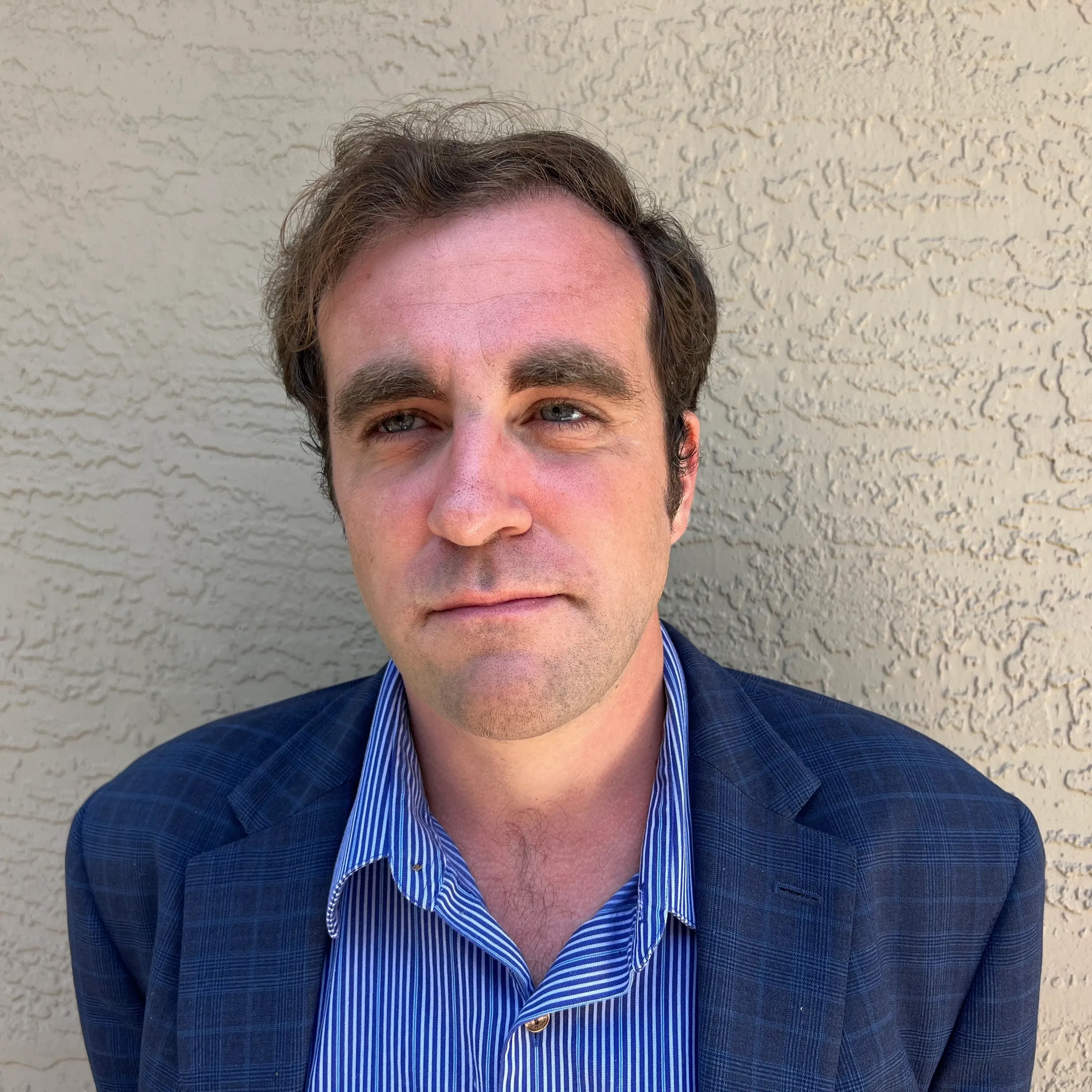
- Born: 36–37
- Writing career
- Genre: Journalism
- Subject: Politics
- Website: patrickreports.com

Patrick Howley (born 1989) is an American writer. He is the former editor-in-chief of Big League Politics.

Howley has been a reporter for Breitbart News in Washington, D.C., The Washington Free Beacon, and The Daily Caller. He previously was an assistant editor for The American Spectator. He has written for National File and far-right newspaper The Epoch Times.

In January 2017, Howley left Breitbart to start the far-right website Big League Politics.

In 2019, Howley broke the story of a blackface and KKK costume photograph in Virginia governor Ralph Northam's medical school yearbook after receiving a tip from a "concerned citizen". Howley's website also broke the news of sexual assault allegations against Virginia lieutenant governor Justin Fairfax.

In 2020, writing for National File, Howley broke the story of then-Democratic U.S. Senate candidate Cal Cunningham exchanging sexually suggestive texts with a woman who was not his wife.
