= 2011 Virginia elections =

- November 8, 2011

The 2011 Virginia state elections took place on November 8, 2011. All 140 seats in the Virginia General Assembly were up for re-election, as were many local offices.

== Virginia Senate ==
2011 Virginia Senate election
- November 8, 2011

All 40 seats in the Senate of Virginia 21 (Note: A majority of 20 is also possible as the Lt. Gov. of Virginia holds a tie-breaker vote.) seats needed for a majority
- Turnout: 1,398,172
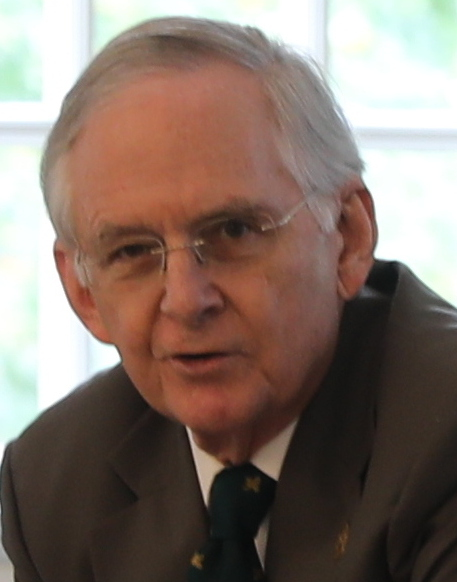

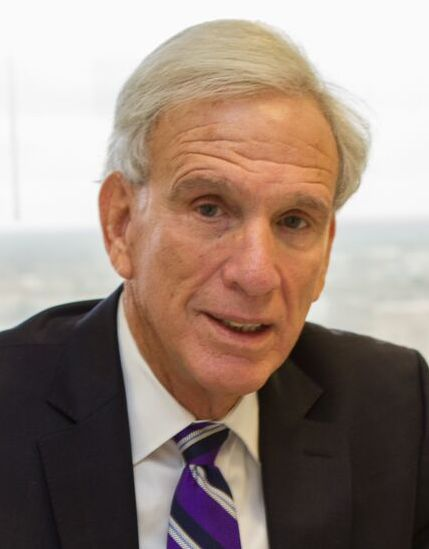
	Majority party	Minority party
Leader	Tommy Norment	Dick Saslaw
Party	Republican	Democratic
Leader since	January 9, 2008	January 10, 1996
Leader's seat	3rd district	35th district
Last election	19	21
Seats before	18	22
Seats won	20	20
Seat change	▲2	▼2
Popular vote	768,914	535,703
Percentage	55%	38.3%
- Results: Democratic hold Republican hold Republican gain
Majority leader before election
Dick Saslaw
Democratic
Elected Majority leader
Tommy Norment
Republican

Prior to the election, Democrats held 22 seats, and Republicans held 18 seats. Redistricting caused the 13th district to be moved from Hampton Roads to Northern Virginia and the 22nd district to be moved from the Roanoke area to a district stretching from Lynchburg to Richmond. Republicans gained two seats, making the Senate tied with 20 Democrats and 20 Republicans.

== Virginia House of Delegates ==
2011 Virginia House of Delegates elections
- November 8, 2011

All 100 seats in the Virginia House of Delegates 51 seats needed for a majority
- Turnout: 28.6% ▼11.8
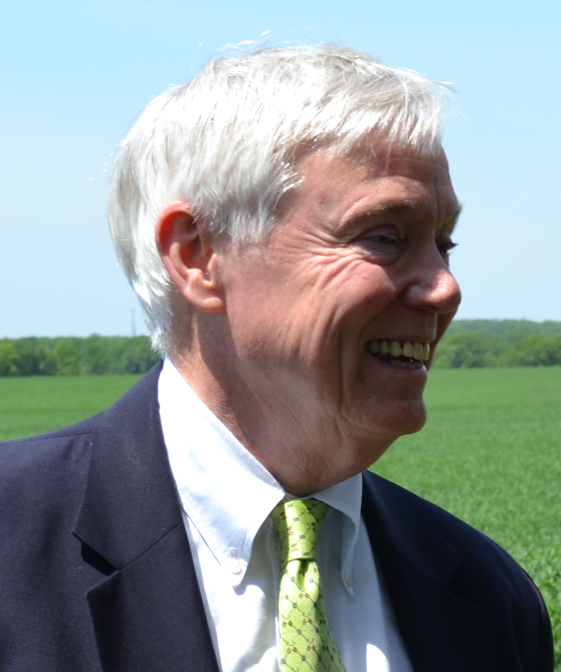

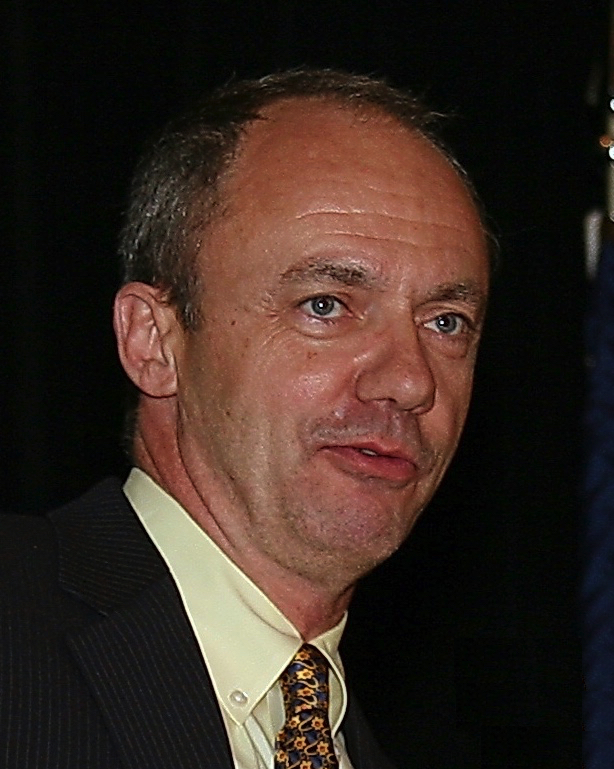
	Majority party	Minority party
Leader	Bill Howell	Ward Armstrong (lost re-election)
Party	Republican	Democratic
Leader since	January 8, 2003	February 24, 2007
Leader's seat	28th	9th
Last election	59	39
Seats won	67	32
Seat change	▲8	▼7
Popular vote	762,993	438,174
Percentage	59.8%	34.4%
Swing	▲3.0%	▼1.8%
- Results: Republican hold Republican gain Democratic hold Independent hold
Speaker before election
Bill Howell
Republican
Elected Speaker
Bill Howell
Republican

The Virginia House of Delegates election of 2011 was held on Tuesday, November 8. Before the election, the House of Delegates consisted of 58 Republicans, 39 Democrats, 2 Independents, with one vacant seat previously held by a Republican (Glenn Oder of the 94th district, who resigned in August 2011). Redistricting eliminated three seats: Southwestern Virginia's 2nd district, the Martinsville-area 10th district, and the Norfolk-based 87th district. These three seats were moved to Northern Virginia. Republicans gained seven seats from the Democrats and one seat from a retiring independent, making the House's composition 67 Republicans, 32 Democrats, and 1 Independent.
