= National File =

American right-wing blog and news website

- Website type: Blog, news website
- Founded: August 2019
- Founder: Alex Jones
- Editor: Tom Pappert
- Website: nationalfile.com

National File is an American right-wing blog and news website created by Alex Jones in August 2019. It is known for publishing false or misleading claims about COVID-19 and the COVID-19 vaccines.

== Company ==
National File was founded in August 2019 by far-right figure and conspiracy theorist Alex Jones. Leaked texts from Jones's phone indicated that he started National File to promote content from his InfoWars website while obscuring its origin to evade Facebook's ban of Infowars, and to set up a business vehicle for his son Rex.

Its editor-in-chief and owner is Tom Pappert, who was previously the administrator of a "God Emperor Trump" Facebook group. Patrick Howley is a politics reporter for the website. The website's publisher is Noel Fritsch, a North Carolina political consultant who has worked for far-right political candidates.

== Content ==
National File has been described as right-wing, far-right, and conservative. It is known for publishing COVID-19 misinformation, including false claims that the Centers for Disease Control and Prevention exaggerated the number of COVID-19 fatalities, that Pfizer was developing an oral drug to be administered "alongside vaccines", and that the Pfizer–BioNTech COVID-19 vaccine caused neurodegenerative conditions. National File also publishes misinformation about the 2020 United States presidential election. As of early 2021, National File is the 10th most followed account on Gab, a social networking service known for its far-right userbase.

On January 14, 2020, National File reiterated a story from trade publication Tri-State Livestock News, wherein South Dakota cattle veterinarian James Stangle falsely claims that Impossible Whoppers contain "44 mg of estrogen" and that "six glasses of soy milk per day has enough estrogen to grow boobs on a male." Stangle later retracted this story as, in fact, he was referring to isoflavones, not estrogen; Impossible Whoppers contain 2 mg of isoflavones, not 44; and – as of 2021 – there is no evidence showing a link between isoflavones and feminization or childhood development, and there is evidence to the contrary.

On October 7, 2020, Patrick Howley of National File broke the story that Cal Cunningham, then a Democratic candidate in the 2020 Senate election in North Carolina, had exchanged sexually suggestive texts with a woman who was not his wife.

On October 23, 2020, National File published photos they claimed showed Mark Kelly, at the time a candidate in the 2020 special election in Arizona, at a college party in 1985 dressed as Adolf Hitler. Several classmates of Kelly's stated that he was not the man in the photo, and PolitiFact rated the National File story "false". Kelly filed a defamation lawsuit against National File on October 26.

On October 26, 2020, National File published what it claimed to be the contents of a diary by Ashley Biden, a daughter of then-presidential candidate Joe Biden. The diary had been sold to Project Veritas, a far-right activist group, whose founder said the diary's authenticity could not be confirmed.

On February 27, 2022, two days before the Texas Republican primary, National File posted audio of an interview with former jihadist Tania Joya, a British woman then living in Plano, Texas, who said that she and Van Taylor—U.S. representative for Plano and primary candidate—had a nine-month sexual affair in 2020 and 2021. Joya shared salacious details about the affair and said that Taylor had given her US$5,000 for personal expenses. Her statements circulated widely on social media, prompting Taylor to admit to an extramarital affair and end his reelection campaign, effectively ceding the primary to Republican runner-up Keith Self. Taylor was one of the few Republican U.S. representatives to join Democrats in voting to establish the January 6 commission to investigate the storming of the U.S. Capitol, a vote that caused him to be intensely criticized by primary election opponents and conservative commentators, despite his conservative voting record on other issues.
