= 2021 Virginia elections =

- November 2, 2021
- Turnout: 54.9% ▲7.7

The 2021 Virginia elections were held on Tuesday, November 2, 2021. Republicans swept all three statewide races and won back control of the House of Delegates in an upset. Primary elections were held on June 8, 2021. It was the first state gubernatorial and legislative election to be held since the passage of several voting rights bills into law by the Democratic trifecta in the 161st Virginia General Assembly, including expansions of early voting, designation of Election Day as a paid state holiday, legalization of automatic and same-day voter registration, the Voting Rights Act of Virginia, and repeal of Voter ID laws.

== Governor ==
Incumbent Democratic governor Ralph Northam was unable to run for reelection, as the Constitution of Virginia prohibits the officeholder from serving consecutive terms. Glenn Youngkin won the gubernatorial election against former governor Terry McAuliffe.

2021 Virginia gubernatorial election
Party	Candidate	Votes	%	±%
Republican	Glenn Youngkin	1,663,158	50.58%	+5.61
Democratic	Terry McAuliffe	1,599,470	48.64%	−5.26
Liberation	Princess Blanding	23,107	0.70%	New
Write-in		2,592	0.08%	+0.03
Total votes		3,288,327	100.00%	
Republican gain from Democratic				

== Lieutenant governor ==
Incumbent lieutenant governor Justin Fairfax was eligible to run for a second term, but instead ran for governor, being defeated in the Democratic primary. Though Fairfax won the last lieutenant governor race with almost 53% of the vote, Republican Winsome Sears won this election by almost two points, becoming the first woman, the first woman of color, and the first Jamaican American chosen for the post.

2021 Virginia lieutenant gubernatorial election
Party	Candidate	Votes	%	±%
Republican	Winsome Sears	1,658,332	50.71%	+3.53
Democratic	Hala Ayala	1,608,030	49.17%	−3.55
Write-in		3,807	0.12%	+0.03
Total votes		3,270,169	100.00%	
Republican gain from Democratic				

== Attorney general ==
Incumbent attorney general Mark Herring ran for re-election to a third term. He was re-elected in 2017 with 53.3% of the vote. A primary challenge by delegate Jay Jones was supported by Governor Ralph Northam, as well as several federal and state legislators. Jason Miyares was elected the first Cuban American and Hispanic Attorney General of Virginia.

2021 Virginia Attorney General election
Party	Candidate	Votes	%	±%
Republican	Jason Miyares	1,647,100	50.36%	+3.80
Democratic	Mark Herring (incumbent)	1,620,564	49.55%	−3.79
Write-in		2,995	0.09%	+0.01
Total votes		3,270,659	100.00%	
Republican gain from Democratic				

== House of Delegates ==
All 100 seats in the Virginia House of Delegates were up for election. The chamber was controlled by Democrats after the 2019 elections, holding a majority of ten seats. The chamber returned to the Republican Party following the 2021 elections, electing Todd Gilbert as the Speaker of the House.

House of Delegates
Party	Before	After	Change
Democratic	55	48	▼7
Republican	45	52	▲7
Total	100	100	
