= Jim Dillard =

American politician (born 1933)

Member of the Virginia House of Delegates
- In office January 9, 1980 – September 1, 2005
- Preceded by: Dick Saslaw
- Succeeded by: Dave Marsden
- Constituency: 19th district (1980‍–‍1982); 51st district (1982‍–‍1983); 41st district (1983‍–‍2005)
- In office January 12, 1972 – January 11, 1978
- Succeeded by: Gladys Keating
- Constituency: 19th district

Personal details
- Born: James Hardy Dillard II; November 21, 1933 (age 92) Charlottesville, Virginia, U.S.
- Party: Republican
- Spouse: Joyce Woods Butt
- Children: 4
- Education: College of William & Mary (BA); American University (MA)
- Occupation: Educator; politician

James Hardy Dillard II (born November 21, 1933) is a politician and former Republican member of the Virginia House of Delegates. He represented the 41st district, which includes part of Fairfax County, from 1972 to 1978 and from 1980 to his retirement in 2005.

In the years after leaving office, Dillard has strayed from the Republican Party; endorsing Mark Warner for the United States Senate in 2008; his Democratic successor as Delegate for the 41st district, Dave Marsden, on several occasions; and his defeated 1999 opponent for the Virginia House of Delegates, Democrat Eileen Filler-Corn, to replace Marsden in that seat in 2010. He also declared President George W. Bush's No Child Left Behind program to be a failure. Dillard, however, claims to be an Independent.
