= Big League Politics =

Far-right American political website

- Website type: Far-right politics
- Available in: English
- Owner: Mustard Seed Media
- Website: bigleaguepolitics.com
- Current status: Active

Big League Politics is a far-right American media website that promotes conspiracy theories. The website was founded by former Breitbart News employees. The site was announced in 2017 by one of its founders as an investigative outfit. In early 2018, Big League Politics was acquired by Mustard Seed Media which is owned by Reilly O'Neal and Noel Fritsch. The Wall Street Journal describes the website as "a scrappy, pro-Trump outfit backed by Republican operatives".

== Content ==
The website has promoted conspiracy theories, on subjects such as QAnon and the murder of Seth Rich. The New York Times described Big League Politics as "an obscure right-wing news site [...] which has promoted conspiracy theories and written favorably about white nationalist candidates." Huffington Post said it is intended for "people who find Breitbart too reasonable." According to Mother Jones, the website "has published stories attacking anti-fascist activists and trying to downplay the role of neo-Nazi violence in the death of Heather Heyer at the Unite the Right rally in Charlottesville in 2017. It went so far as to falsely blame an anti-racism activist and professor from the University of North Carolina-Chapel Hill for her death." It pushed falsehoods about the 2020 United States presidential election.

Big League Politics is best known for breaking a story in February 2019 about a racist photo on Virginia Governor Ralph Northam's 1984 yearbook page, leading to widespread calls for the governor's resignation during the 2019 Virginia political crisis. The website also published sexual assault allegations against Virginia Lieutenant Governor Justin Fairfax.
