= Virginia's 35th Senate district =

American legislative district

Virginia's 35th State Senate district
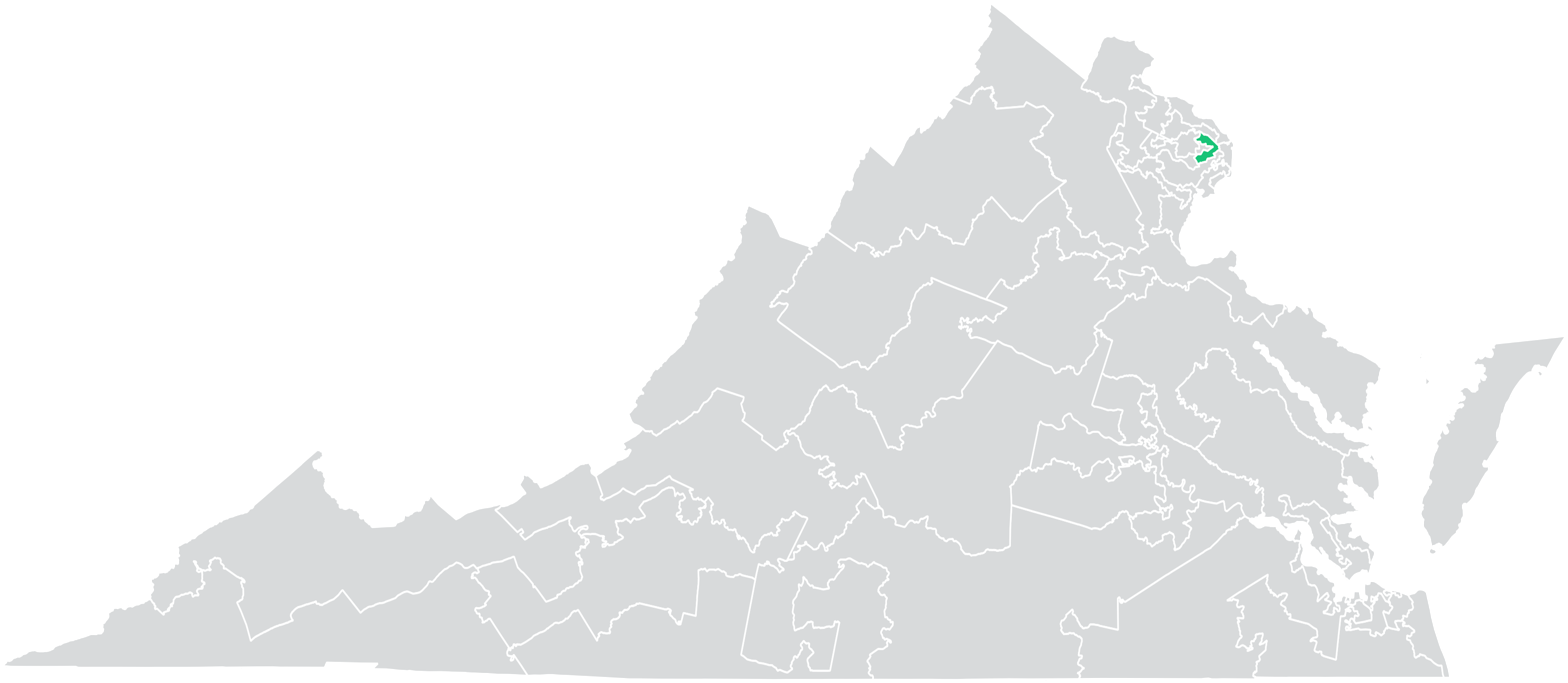
Senator
David W. Marsden; D–Burke
- Demographics: 41% White; 13% Black; 25% Hispanic; 16% Asian; 4% Other
- Population (2019): 208,503
- Registered voters: 121,410

Virginia's 35th Senate district is one of 40 districts in the Senate of Virginia. It is represented by David W. Marsden. It was previously represented by Democrat Dick Saslaw.

== Geography ==
District 35 covers all of Falls Church and parts of Fairfax County and Alexandria in the suburbs of Washington, D.C., including some or all of Merrifield, Idylwood, West Falls Church, Seven Corners, Bailey's Crossroads, Lincolnia, Annandale, Springfield, and West Springfield. At just over 32 square miles, it is the smallest Senate district in Virginia.

The district overlaps with Virginia's 8th and 11th congressional districts, and with the 38th, 39th, 42nd, 46th, 49th, and 53rd districts of the Virginia House of Delegates.

== Recent election results ==
=== 2019 ===
2019 Virginia Senate election, District 35
Party	Candidate	Votes	%
Democratic	Dick Saslaw (incumbent)	7,381	48.6
Democratic	Yasmine Taeb	6,945	45.8
Democratic	Karen Elena Torrent	853	5.6
Total votes		15,179	100
General election
Democratic	Dick Saslaw (incumbent)	35,131	92.5
Total votes		37,964	100
Democratic hold			

=== 2015 ===
2015 Virginia Senate election, District 35
Party	Candidate	Votes	%
Democratic	Dick Saslaw (incumbent)	18,754	74.4
Independent Greens	Terry Modglin	6,055	24.0
Total votes		25,192	100
Democratic hold			

=== 2011 ===
2011 Virginia Senate election, District 35
Party	Candidate	Votes	%
Democratic	Dick Saslaw (incumbent)	15,905	61.7
Republican	Robert Sarvis	9,272	35.9
Independent Greens	Katherine Pettigrew	591	2.3
Total votes		25,796	100
Democratic hold			

== Historical election results ==
All election results below took place prior to 2011 redistricting, and thus were under different district lines.

=== 2007 ===
2007 Virginia Senate election, District 35
Party	Candidate	Votes	%
Democratic	Dick Saslaw (incumbent)	16,856	77.9
Independent	Mario Palmiotto	4,532	21.0
Total votes		21,626	100
Democratic hold			

=== 2003 ===
2003 Virginia Senate election, District 35
Party	Candidate	Votes	%
Democratic	Dick Saslaw (incumbent)	17,735	82.5
Independent	C. W. Levy	3,537	16.4
Total votes		21,503	100
Democratic hold			

=== 1999 ===
1999 Virginia Senate election, District 35
Party	Candidate	Votes	%
Democratic	Dick Saslaw (incumbent)	19,257	57.6
Republican	Robert Neitz	13,554	40.5
Independent	D. D. Goode	611	1.8
Total votes		33,437	100
Democratic hold			

=== 1995 ===
1995 Virginia Senate election, District 35
Primary election
Party	Candidate	Votes	%
Republican	Paul Brubaker	936	52.1
Republican	William Houston	860	47.9
Total votes		1,796	100
Democratic	Dick Saslaw (incumbent)	21,012	57.0
Republican	Paul Brubaker	15,833	42.9
Total votes		36,864	100
Democratic hold			

== Recent results in statewide elections ==
Year	Office	Results
2020	President	Biden 75.1–23.1%
2017	Governor	Northam 75.4–23.7%
2016	President	Clinton 72.8–21.9%
2014	Senate	Warner 66.0–31.6%
2013	Governor	McAuliffe 66.9–28.2%
2012	President	Obama 68.5–30.2%
2012	Senate	Kaine 69.6–30.4%
