= Eileen Filler-Corn =

American politician (born 1964)

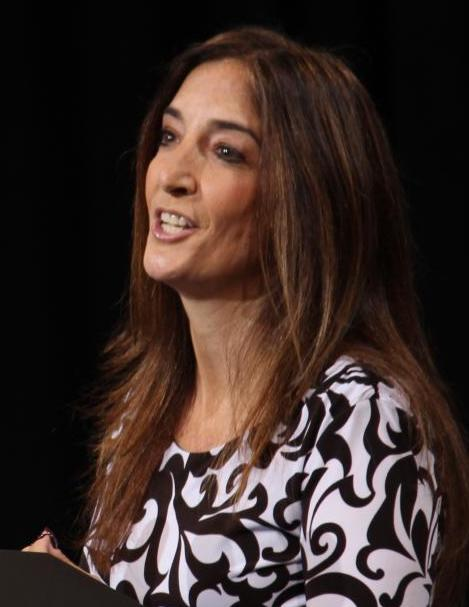

Minority Leader of the Virginia House of Delegates
- In office January 12, 2022 – April 27, 2022
- Preceded by: Todd Gilbert
- Succeeded by: Don Scott
- In office January 1, 2019 – January 8, 2020
- Preceded by: David Toscano
- Succeeded by: Todd Gilbert

56th Speaker of the Virginia House of Delegates
- In office January 8, 2020 – January 11, 2022
- Preceded by: Kirk Cox
- Succeeded by: Todd Gilbert

Member of the Virginia House of Delegates from the 41st district
- In office March 3, 2010 – January 10, 2024
- Preceded by: David W. Marsden
- Succeeded by: Chris Obenshain (redistricting)

Personal details
- Born: Eileen Robin Filler; June 5, 1964 (age 62) New York City, New York, U.S.
- Party: Democratic
- Spouse: Robert Corn
- Children: 2
- Education: Ithaca College (BA); American University (JD)

Eileen Robin Filler-Corn (born June 5, 1964) is an American lawyer and politician who served as the Minority Leader of the Virginia House of Delegates from January to April 2022, a position she previously held from 2019 to 2020. She previously served as the 56th Speaker of the Virginia House of Delegates from 2020 to 2022. She represented the 41st district in the Fairfax County suburbs of Washington, D.C., from 2010 to 2024. She is a member of the Democratic Party. She is also the first woman and Jewish person to serve as Speaker of the Virginia House of Delegates.

== Personal life ==
Filler-Corn was born in New York City and grew up in West Windsor, New Jersey, graduating from West Windsor-Plainsboro High School in 1982. She graduated from Ithaca College with a Bachelor of Arts in 1986. She attended law school at American University's Washington College of Law in 1993. In the time between her two college stints, she worked on Democrat Jeff Laurenti's unsuccessful 1986 campaign to defeat incumbent Republican congressman Chris Smith. She has two children with her husband Robert Corn, President of Landmark Strategies, Inc., a national issue advocacy, grassroots engagement and campaign voter contact firm.

== Career ==
Filler-Corn made her first run for office in 1999, running unsuccessfully for the 41st district seat.

She again ran for the seat in a 2010 special election to replace David W. Marsden, who had himself won a special election to the Senate of Virginia the month before. She won by 37 votes. She was sworn in on March 3, 2010, after her opponent dropped his plans to request a recount.

During the 2010 campaign, she was endorsed by Jim Dillard, the Republican incumbent who had defeated her in 1999 because of her opponent's position that funding for Fairfax County Public Schools was "excessive".

On January 1, 2019, Filler-Corn became Leader of the House Democratic Caucus, and was the first woman to lead a caucus in the 400-year history of the Virginia House of Delegates. From 2020 to 2022, Filler-Corn served as the Chair of the Rules Committee and as Chair of the Joint Rules Subcommittee.

On January 8, 2020, the new Democratic majority elected Filler-Corn Speaker of the Virginia House of Delegates. She is both the first woman and Jewish person to serve in this position. On November 9, 2019, following elections where the Democratic Party of Virginia won control of the House, the incoming caucus officially nominated her for the position of Speaker in the 161st General Assembly. She began her term as Speaker on January 8, 2020.

On May 26, 2020, Filler-Corn endorsed Joe Biden for President after he had secured the nomination and was the presumptive nominee.

On April 27, 2022, Filler-Corn was removed from her position as Democratic leader after a vote of the party caucus; no official reason was given at that point in time. The caucus did not have an immediate vote to fill the position, but it is now held by Don Scott. It was later revealed that she was accused of not spending enough on Democratic House of Delegates races, money that her critics felt might have made a difference in some tight House races that went to Republicans.

In May 2022, a judge fined Filler-Corn $500 for violating the Freedom of Information Act (FOIA). The violation occurred after a lawyer requested records on details surrounding the removal of Confederate statues from the Virginia State Capitol, which Filler-Corn responded stating that the documents did not exist. The lawyer then filed a FOIA request with the Virginia Department of General Services, which did return records.

In March 2023, Filler-Corn announced she would not run for reelection. On October 18, 2023, she announced that she would run for Congress in Virginia's 10th congressional district to succeed outgoing U.S. Representative Jennifer Wexton. She lost the Democratic primary to Suhas Subramanyam.

In June 2023, a campaign finance complaint was filed to the Federal Election Commission against Filler-Corn, alleging violations of federal campaign finance laws. The complaint claimed her campaign misreported contributions and expenses and failed to accurately disclose donor information, raising concerns about transparency and compliance with campaign finance regulations. According to the complaint, Filler-Corn gave the Democratic Majority for Israel PAC $110,000 a day after the group endorsed her.

== Political positions ==
Filler-Corn is a supporter of Israel and is a board director on the American Jewish Committee. Following October 7th attacks, she attended the March for Israel in Washington, D.C., as a speaker.

== Electoral history ==
Date	Election	Candidate	Party	Votes	%
Virginia House of Delegates, 41st district
November 2, 1999	General	J H Dillard II	Republican	7,752	58.52
November 2, 1999	General	E R Filler-Corn	Democratic	5,482	41.38
November 2, 1999	General	Write Ins		13	0.10
November 2, 1999	General	Incumbent won; Republican hold			
March 2, 2010	Special	Eileen Filler-Corn	Democratic	5,758	50.13
March 2, 2010	Special	Kerry D. Bolognese	Republican	5,721	49.80
March 2, 2010	Special	Write Ins		7	0.06
March 2, 2010	Special	David W. Marsden was elected to the Senate; Democratic hold			
November 8, 2011	General	Eileen Filler-Corn	Democratic	11,959	68.01
November 8, 2011	General	Mike R. Kane	Libertarian	5,509	31.33
November 8, 2011	General	Write Ins		114	0.64
November 5, 2013	General	Eileen Filler-Corn	Democratic	15,030	56.9
November 5, 2013	General	Fredy Burgos	Republican	10,392	39.41
November 5, 2013	General	Christopher DeCarlo	Independent	944	3.58
November 5, 2013	General	Write Ins		37	0.1
November 3, 2015	General	Eileen Filler-Corn	Democratic	12,175	92.8
November 3, 2015	General	Write Ins		945	7.2
November 7, 2017	General	Eileen Filler-Corn	Democratic	22,985	90.8
November 7, 2017	General	Write Ins		2,317	9.2
November 5, 2019	General	Eileen Filler-Corn	Democratic	17,302	71.58
November 5, 2019	General	John Michael Wolfe	Independent	4,568	18.90
November 5, 2019	General	Rachel Mace	Libertarian	1,875	7.76
November 5, 2019	General	Write Ins		428	
November 2, 2021	General	Eileen Filler-Corn	Democratic	23,201	65.14
November 2, 2021	General	John Michael Wolfe	Republican	12,346	34.66
November 2, 2021	General	Write Ins		71	0.2
United States House of Representatives, Virginia's 10th district
June 18, 2024	Primary	Suhas Subramanyam	Democratic	13,504	30.4
June 18, 2024	Primary	Dan Helmer	Democratic	11,784	26.6
June 18, 2024	Primary	Atif Qarni	Democratic	4,768	10.7
June 18, 2024	Primary	Eileen Filler-Corn	Democratic	4,131	9.3
June 18, 2024	Primary	Jennifer Boysko	Democratic	4,016	9.0
June 18, 2024	Primary	David Reid	Democratic	1,419	3.2
June 18, 2024	Primary	Michelle Maldonado	Democratic	1,412	3.2
June 18, 2024	Primary	Adrian Pokharel	Democratic	1,028	2.3
June 18, 2024	Primary	Krystle Kaul	Democratic	982	2.2
June 18, 2024	Primary	Travis Nembhard	Democratic	722	1.6
June 18, 2024	Primary	Marion Devoe	Democratic	386	0.9
June 18, 2024	Primary	Mark Leighton	Democratic	224	0.5

Virginia House of Delegates
Preceded by David Toscano	Minority Leader of the Virginia House of Delegates; 2019–2020	Succeeded by Todd Gilbert
Preceded by Todd Gilbert	Minority Leader of the Virginia House of Delegates; 2022	Succeeded by Don Scott
Political offices
Preceded by Kirk Cox	Speaker of the Virginia House of Delegates; 2020–2022	Succeeded by Todd Gilbert
