= Dick Saslaw =

American politician (born 1940)

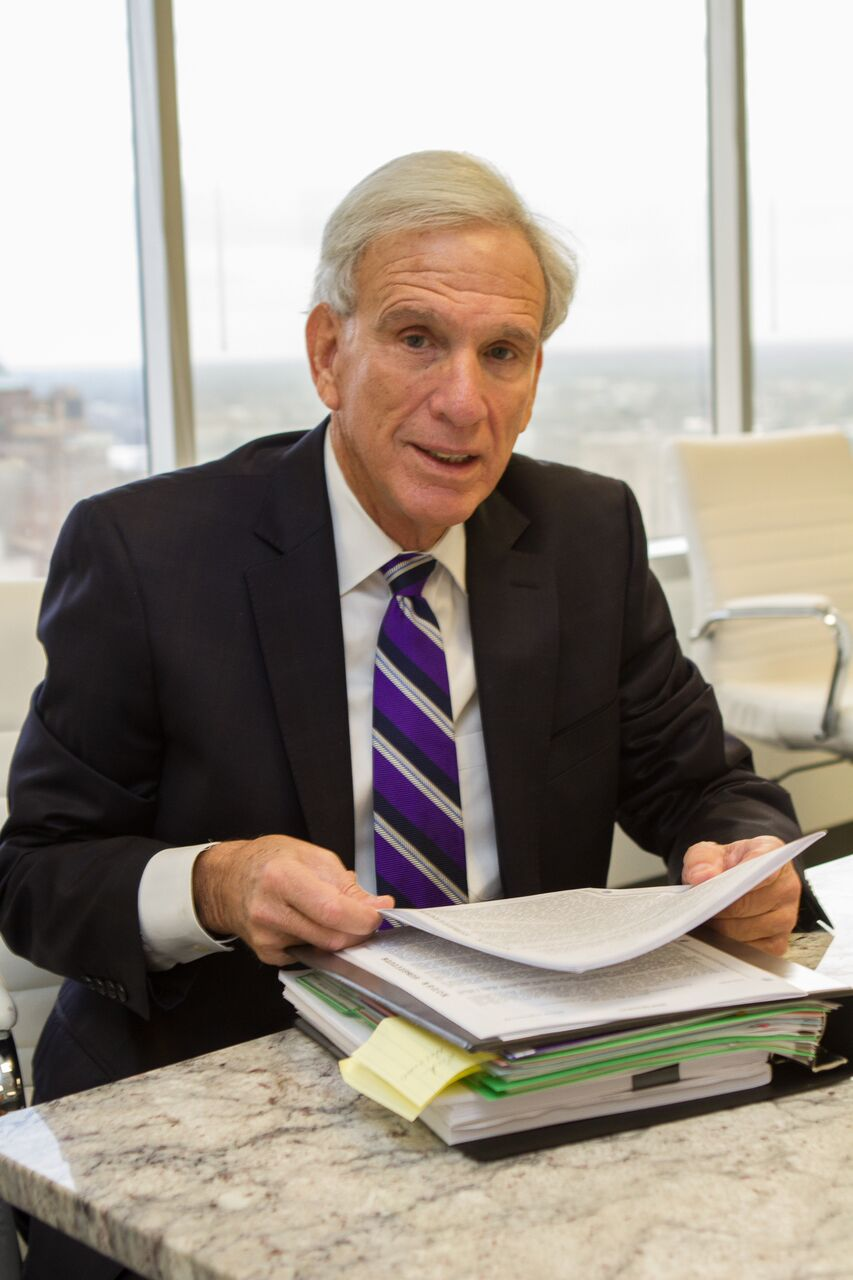
- Saslaw in 2018

Majority Leader of the Virginia Senate
- In office January 8, 2020 – January 10, 2024
- Preceded by: Tommy Norment
- Succeeded by: Scott Surovell
- In office January 28, 2014 – June 12, 2014
- Preceded by: Tommy Norment
- Succeeded by: Tommy Norment
- In office January 2008 – January 12, 2012
- Preceded by: Walter Stosch
- Succeeded by: Tommy Norment

Minority Leader of the Virginia Senate
- In office June 12, 2014 – January 8, 2020
- Preceded by: Tommy Norment
- Succeeded by: Tommy Norment
- In office January 12, 2012 – January 28, 2014
- Preceded by: Tommy Norment
- Succeeded by: Tommy Norment
- In office January 1998 – January 2008
- Succeeded by: Tommy Norment

Member of the Virginia Senate from the 35th district
- In office January 9, 1980 – January 10, 2024
- Preceded by: Omer Hirst
- Succeeded by: Dave Marsden (Redistricting)

Member of the Virginia House of Delegates from the 19th district
- In office January 14, 1976 – January 9, 1980
- Preceded by: James Tate
- Succeeded by: Jim Dillard

Personal details
- Born: Richard Lawrence Saslaw; February 5, 1940 (age 86) Washington, D.C., U.S.
- Party: Democratic
- Spouse: Eleanor Saslaw
- Children: 1
- Education: University of Maryland, College Park (BA)
- Website: Official website

Military service
- Allegiance: United States
- Branch/service: United States Army
- Years of service: 1958–1960

Richard Lawrence Saslaw (born February 5, 1940) is an American politician who served as Majority Leader of the Senate of Virginia between 2020 – 2024, when he declined to run for reelection. A member of the Democratic Party, he served in the Virginia House of Delegates from 1976–80, then was elected to the Senate of Virginia. He represented the 35th district, made up of the city of Falls Church and portions of Fairfax County and the city of Alexandria.

Saslaw was the leader of the Virginia Senate Democrats from 1998 to 2024. He served as Senate Majority Leader from 2020 to 2024, having previously served from 2008 to 2012 and January to June 2014. He served as Senate Minority Leader from 1998 to 2008, 2012 to January 2014, and June 2014 to 2020. He ran for Congress in Virginia's 8th congressional district in 1984. He was defeated by then-Congressman Stanford Parris.

== Early life ==
Saslaw was born and raised in Washington, D.C. He attended Woodrow Wilson High School. He served in the United States Army (1958–60), before receiving a B.S. degree in economics from the University of Maryland. After that, he went into the gasoline service station business.

== Majority Leader ==
Senator Saslaw was first elected as Virginia State Senate Floor Leader by his peers in 1996, under a power-sharing agreement that took place when the Senate was evenly divided between Democrats and Republicans. In 1998, he was elected to Senate Minority Leader, and was continuously re-elected until becoming Senate Majority Leader when the Democrats assumed control of the chamber in 2008. He continued as Majority Leader until 2012, when the Democrats lost control. He served as Minority Leader from 2012 through 2019, except for the first half of 2014, when he served as Majority Leader. He was later again elected Majority Leader.

He was Chair of the Senate's Commerce and Labor Committee, and a ranking member of the Senate Judiciary (formerly Courts of Justice), Education and Health, Finance and Appropriations, and Rules Committees.

== Political positions ==
=== Gun control ===
In the 2019 legislative session, he proposed legislation to raise the age for which a person is allowed to buy a gun in Virginia from 18 to 21, and he proposed a ban on so called "bump stocks." Republicans did not allow either of those bills to pass out of committee.

In February 2011, Saslaw was one of eight senators on the Senate Courts of Justice Committee who "passed by indefinitely" House Bill 1573, suppressing the bill by an 8 to 4 margin. The bill, also known as Castle Doctrine, would have allowed "a lawful occupant use of physical force, including deadly force, against an intruder in his dwelling who has committed an overt act against him, without civil liability."

=== Abortion ===
Senator Saslaw has voted against attempts to restrict women's ability to obtain an abortion in Virginia. He has been endorsed by NARAL Virginia and by Planned Parenthood of the Greater Metropolitan Washington Area.

=== Medicaid expansion in Virginia ===
Senator Saslaw is credited with saving the Democratic push for Medicaid expansion in Virginia by thwarting an attempted procedural move by Republican Senator Tommy Norment to kill the bill in committee. Norment attempted to have the bill to expand Medicaid in Virginia killed in committee a second time, which would have made the bill ineligible for presentation to the full senate. Saslaw caught the move and thwarted it, thus allowing the bill to proceed and eventually become law in Virginia in 2018. Medicaid expansion brought health insurance coverage to over 400,000 Virginians.

=== Environment and renewables ===
Saslaw has been described as a reliable ally of Dominion Energy, Virginia's largest electrical utility which is also notable for its influence on Virginia politics. In 2018, the Associated Press reported that Dominion had been Saslaw's largest source of campaign funds, contributing approximately $350,000 over a 15-year period. Saslaw helped push Dominion-backed legislation that would allow the firm to charge customers rates that regulators considered to be excessive. When the Virginia Democratic Party criticized a Republican state senator for being too cozy with Dominion Energy, Dominion sent an email to Saslaw to complain. Saslaw responded by apologizing to Dominion and criticized his own party for failing to do its "homework" on "how generous Dominion has been to me" and the party.

Saslaw was the co-patron of the Grid Transformation and Security Act of 2018, which ended the rate freeze and allowed the State Corporation Commission—Virginia's regulatory agency that oversees public utilities—to return to regularly reviewing utility rates, and for $200 million in credits to be refunded to ratepayers. The bill also declared 5,000mw of new solar energy projects to be "in the public interest," making it easier for such projects to be approved by the SCC.

=== Education ===
Education has been one of his top legislative priorities throughout his tenure. He was the ranking member of the Senate Education and Health Committee, and Chair of the Higher Education Subcommittee. In 2006, the Virginia Association of School Boards named him Legislator of the Year. In 2013, the Virginia Education Association named him Legislator of the Year for his work in commissioning a study of school funding in Virginia by JLARC (Joint Legislative Audit and Review Commission). One result of Virginia expanding Medicaid in 2018 was that additional money was made available in the budget for a 3% teacher pay raise. That initial 3% was then increased to 5% in the 2019 legislative session, along with $25 million for at-risk students and $12 million for additional school counselors. Senator Saslaw has been endorsed for re-election in 2019 by the Virginia Education Association.

=== Transportation and Metro funding ===
Senator Saslaw was chief patron of a bill to resolve the battle over a dedicated revenue source for the DC-area Metro improvements and operations. The bill states that Virginia will contribute $154 million a year to Metro, with Maryland and Washington, DC contributing the remainder needed to reach $500 million annually. This bill was considered a breakthrough, since any such inter-state deal has typically stalled on the Virginia side, due to the Republican control of the General Assembly.

== Controversy ==
In February 2019, Saslaw made headlines as the only Democratic elected official in Virginia to initially defend Virginia Governor Ralph Northam when photos on the latter's medical school yearbook page surfaced showing two men, one of whom was in blackface and one of whom was in robes resembling those of the Ku Klux Klan.

Saslaw later clarified in an official statement that the pictures could only be described "as racist, as unacceptable, and as painful," and along with the Senate Democratic Caucus, issued a statement calling for Northam's resignation.

== 2019 Democratic primary ==
In September 2018, Yasmine Taeb, an attorney at the Center for Victims of Torture, announced that she would challenge Senator Saslaw for the Democratic nomination for the 35th district in the state senate. She moved to the district "within the past year to be closer to the immigrant communities with whom she works," moving from nearby Arlington County, where she previously ran for a House of Delegates seat in 2014, finishing in last place.

Karen Torrent, an environmental lawyer and long-time resident of the district, also challenged Senator Saslaw in the June 11 primary. Saslaw successfully fended off the challenges from Taeb and Torrent and won renomination during the June 11 primary

== Election history ==
Year	Subject	Party	Votes	%	Opponent	Party	Votes	%	Opponent	Party	Votes	%
8th Congressional District of Virginia
1984	Richard L. Saslaw	Democratic	97,250	43.3	Stanford Parris	Republican	125,015	55.7				
35th Virginia Senate District
1999	Richard L. Saslaw	Democratic	19,257	57.6	Robert H. Neitz	Republican	13,554	40.5				
2003	Richard L. Saslaw	Democratic	17,735	82.48	Charles W. Levy	Independent	3,537	16.45				
2007	Richard L. Saslaw	Democratic	16,856	77.94	Mario T. Palmiotto	Independent Green	4,532	20.95				
2011	Richard L. Saslaw	Democratic	15,905	61.7	Robert C. Sarvis	Republican	9,272	35.9				
2015	Richard L. Saslaw	Democratic	18,754	74.4	Terrence W. Modglin	Independent Green	6,055	24.0				
2019	Richard L. Saslaw	Democratic	35,131	92.5	Other/Write-in	2,833	6,055	7.5				

== Retirement ==
In 2023, Saslaw announced he would not seek re-election. He retired in January 2024 at the end of his term.

== Personal life ==
Saslaw and his wife, Eleanor, a retired guidance director and member of the Virginia State Board of Education, settled in northern Virginia in 1968. Their daughter, Jennifer, received her undergraduate degree from the University of Virginia. and her Juris Doctor degree from Stanford Law School. The state districts Saslaw lived in and represented were located in the Springfield area in Virginia

Saslaw is Jewish and has been active in Virginia's Jewish community for decades.

Virginia House of Delegates
Preceded by James Tate	Member of the Virginia House of Delegates from the 19th district 1976–1980	Succeeded by Jim Dillard
Senate of Virginia
Preceded by Omer Hirst	Member of the Virginia Senate from the 35th district 1980–2024	Succeeded by Dave Marsden
Preceded by ???	Minority Leader of the Virginia Senate; 1998–2008	Succeeded by Tommy Norment
Preceded by Walter Stosch	Majority Leader of the Virginia Senate; 2008–2012	Succeeded by Tommy Norment
Preceded by Tommy Norment	Minority Leader of the Virginia Senate; 2012–2014	Succeeded by Tommy Norment
Preceded by Tommy Norment	Majority Leader of the Virginia Senate; 2014	Succeeded by Tommy Norment
Preceded by Tommy Norment	Minority Leader of the Virginia Senate; 2014–2020	Succeeded by Tommy Norment
Preceded by Tommy Norment	Majority Leader of the Virginia Senate; 2020–2024	Succeeded by Scott Surovell
