= Dave Marsden (politician) =

American politician

Member of the Virginia Senate
- Incumbent
- Assumed office January 13, 2010
- Preceded by: Ken Cuccinelli
- Constituency: 37th district (2010–2024); 35th district (2024–present)

Member of the Virginia House of Delegates from the 41st district
- In office January 11, 2006 – January 13, 2010
- Preceded by: Jim Dillard
- Succeeded by: Eileen Filler-Corn

Personal details
- Born: David William Marsden; April 5, 1948 (age 78) Alexandria, Virginia, U.S.
- Party: Democratic
- Spouse: Julia-Anna Thompson
- Children: 3
- Education: Randolph-Macon College (BA)

David William Marsden (born April 5, 1948) is an American politician, who has served in the Virginia Senate since 2010, currently representing Virginia's 35th Senate district, which contains portions of Fairfax County. A member of the Democratic Party, he first entered the Virginia Senate by flipping the 37th district during a 2010 special election to replace then Attorney General-elect Ken Cuccinelli and was the first Democrat to represent that district since 1992. Going on to represent the 37th Senate district for three more terms, he was then redistricted into his current seat during Virginia's 2023 legislative elections.

Before entering the Virginia Senate, Marsden served two terms in the Virginia House of Delegates, representing the 41st district from 2006 until 2010. His tenure in public office follows a seventeen year career leading the Fairfax County Juvenile Detention Center. In 2001, he served, under the gubernatorial administrations of both Jim Gilmore and Mark Warner, for one year as Acting Director of the Virginia Department of Juvenile Justice.

== Early life and education ==
Marsden was raised on a Fairfax County family farm, which has since become the site of an apartment complex. He graduated from Randolph–Macon College with a degree in Sociology.

== Early career ==
Before entering elected office, Marsden had a 29-year career with the Fairfax County Juvenile Court. He began his career there as a juvenile probation officer, then spent seventeen years as head of the Fairfax County Juvenile Detention Center. Upon retiring from that position in 1999, he began work lobbying Virginia state government about juvenile justice policies.

In 2000, Marsden was appointed by then-Governor Jim Gilmore to serve as Chief Deputy of the Virginia Department of Juvenile Justice. Marsden served in that position under former Fairfax County Sherrif Carl Peed. In 2001, he served for one year as Acting Director of the department, beginning while Gilmore was in office and continuing under the tenure of Governor Mark Warner.

Marsden subsequently began working for Development Services Group, a private company where he oversaw a juvenile crime prevention program for the United States Department of Justice.

== Virginia House of Delegates ==
In 2005, Marsden was elected to represent Virginia's 41st House of Delegates district, flipping a seat that had been held for over twenty years by retiring Republican Jim Dillard. A former legislative aide to Dillard, Marsden changed his party affiliation from Republican to Democrat ahead of the 2005 election and was endorsed by his former boss over that year's Republican nominee, Michael J. Golden, an appellate lawyer who had run a failed independent candidacy against Dillard in 2003.

While campaigning in 2005, Marsden positioned himself as a moderate with a focus on gang prevention and transportation policy. He went on to serve two terms in the Virginia House of Delegates and was elected to a third term in 2009, which he did not serve as he entered the Virginia Senate in 2010.

In the 2007 Virginia House of Delegates election, Marsden was uncontested. In the 2009 election, he defeated Republican nominee Kerry Bolognese by about 200 votes.

== Virginia Senate ==
=== Elections ===
On January 12, 2010, Marsden won a special election to replace Republican Ken Cuccinelli as the representative from Virginia's 37th Senate district. Cuccinelli had been elected Attorney General of Virginia the previous fall. The Washington Post described Marsden's election as a "come-from-behind win" in a district that had not been represented by a Democrat since 1992 and noted that it gave Democrats control over all of the Senate districts in Fairfax County. The region had recently supported Republican Bob McDonnell for governor, and Marsden's election gave Democrats a two-seat majority in the Virginia Senate at a time when Republicans controlled every other part of state government.

Marsden won the 2010 special election by 324 votes. His campaign was managed by Robby Mook, who went on to be the campaign manager for Hillary Clinton's 2016 presidential campaign.

Positioning himself as a moderate in the 2010 election, Marsden campaigned on securing funding for schools and transportation projects as well as supporting small businesses. His opponent, Steve Hunt, had previously served on the Fairfax County School Board for one term and had been a vocal opponent of LGBTQ rights during his tenure. Marsden was sworn in as a member of the Virginia Senate one day after the election. An additional special election was held March 2, 2010, to replace Marsden in the Virginia House of Delegates and was won by Democrat Eileen Filler-Corn.

During the 2010 special election, Marsden lived a few hundred feet outside of the 37th Senate district. Located in southwestern Fairfax County, the district at that time included Springfield, West Springfield, Centreville, Chantilly, Fair Oaks, and sections of Burke. The district lines were redrawn to include Marsden's primary residence ahead of the 2011 election.

Marsden was elected to his first full term in the Virginia Senate in 2011, running against Marine veteran Jason Flanary. He won a second full term in 2015, defeating Republican David Bergman, and was uncontested when he won his third full term in 2019. He received no primary challengers in either election.

When Marsden ran for re-election in 2023, he did so from Virginia's 35th Senate district, as a result of legislative redistricting that had occurred in 2021. He was challenged in the 2023 Democratic primary by Heidi Drauschak, an activist with a background in advocating for campaign finance reform. Drauschak had also worked as a White House staffer under President Barack Obama. She took a more progressive stance than Marsden on certain labor issues, such as increases to Virginia's minimum wage, and was supported by Clean Virginia, while Marsden, prior to redistricting, had accepted campaign donations from Dominion Energy.

Marsden advanced to the general election. He then defeated Republican Mark Vafiades for a fourth full term.

=== Legislative work ===
In 2021, Marsden was the chief sponsor of the Virginia Consumer Data Protection Act, making Virginia the second state after California to enact a comprehensive consumer data privacy law. In an interview with The Markup, Marsden acknowledged that the first draft of the legislation was written by an Amazon lobbyist and that he and colleagues relied on the Future of Privacy Forum — a nonprofit funded primarily by major tech companies — for neutral policy guidance during the drafting process. Critics noted that the implementation committee formed after the law's passage included representatives from industry-aligned organizations but no consumer or privacy advocates.

=== Senate committee assignments ===
- Agriculture, Conservation and Natural Resources (Chair)
- Commerce and Labor
- General Laws & Technology
- Transportation
- Rules
