= Tommy Norment =

American politician from Virginia (born 1946)

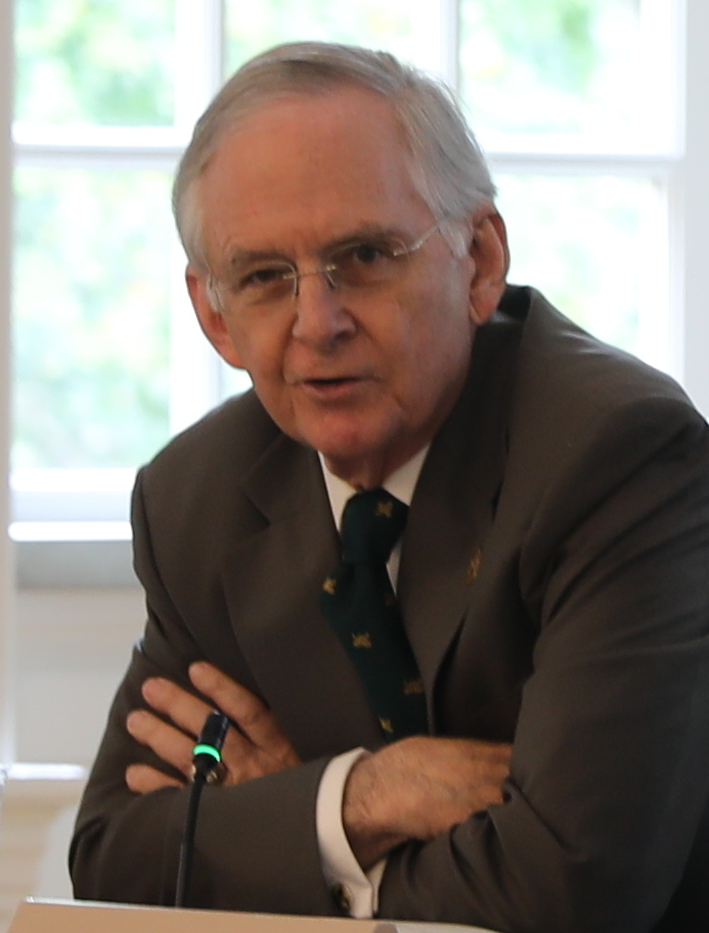
- Norment in 2023

Minority Leader of the Virginia Senate
- In office January 8, 2020 – January 10, 2024
- Preceded by: Dick Saslaw
- Succeeded by: Ryan McDougle
- In office January 28, 2014 – June 12, 2014
- Preceded by: Dick Saslaw
- Succeeded by: Dick Saslaw
- In office January 9, 2008 – January 12, 2012
- Preceded by: Dick Saslaw
- Succeeded by: Dick Saslaw

Majority Leader of the Virginia Senate
- In office June 12, 2014 – January 8, 2020
- Preceded by: Dick Saslaw
- Succeeded by: Dick Saslaw
- In office January 12, 2012 – January 28, 2014
- Preceded by: Dick Saslaw
- Succeeded by: Dick Saslaw

Member of the Virginia Senate from the 3rd district
- In office January 8, 1992 – January 10, 2024
- Preceded by: William Fears
- Succeeded by: Ryan McDougle (Redistricting)

Personal details
- Born: Thomas Kent Norment Jr. April 12, 1946 (age 80) Richmond, Virginia, U.S.
- Party: Republican
- Children: 2
- Education: Virginia Military Institute (BS); College of William and Mary (JD)
- Website: Official website

Thomas Kent Norment Jr. (born April 12, 1946) is an American politician who served as the Minority Leader and Majority Leader of the Senate of Virginia. He was elected to the James City County Board of Supervisors where he served as chairman before being elected to the Virginia Senate in 1991. According to the Clerk of the Virginia Senate, Norment was first elected as Minority Leader in 2007 and is tied with Senator Richard "Dick" Saslaw for having switched between Minority and Majority leader more than any other two senators in Virginia's history. Similarly, Senator Norment holds the records for the longest serving Republican senator as well as the longest serving Senate Republican Leader in the history of the Commonwealth.

A Republican, he represented the 3rd district of the Virginia Senate which, during his service, was based around Williamsburg, Virginia. Norment served on the Commerce and Labor, Judiciary, Rules, and Finance and Appropriations Committees. Norment also served as a member of the Governor's Advisory Council on Revenue Estimates, the Virginia Crime Commission, the Virginia Conflict of Interest and Ethics Advisory Council, and the Major Economic Impact (MEI) Project Approval Commission.

A longtime resident of James City County, Norment maintains an active role in the community. Norment serves as Chairman of the Jamestown-Yorktown Foundation and is the only individual to have served in this role more than once. He has served as a member of the Colonial Williamsburg Foundation's board of trustees. He further serves on the Hampton Roads Board of Directors for TowneBank, chairs the Williamsburg Board of TowneBank, and serves as a member of the College of William and Mary Board of Visitors.

Professionally, Norment is an attorney with Kaufman and Canoles, P.C. and a former law professor at the College of William and Mary. He is a graduate of James Blair High School, the Virginia Military Institute, and the Marshall Wythe School of Law at the College of William and Mary.

== Background ==
Born in the City of Richmond, Norment spent his youth in Williamsburg where he attended James Blair High School. During his time in high school, Norment was elected class president and was named "most likely to succeed". Having served as President of the student council, high school is where the future senator got his first taste of politics. Norment graduated from the Virginia Military Institute and received his J.D. degree from William and Mary School of Law.

Norment opened his first law office in Newport News where his path to becoming a prominent attorney was marked by high-stakes criminal defense cases, including high-profile rape and murder cases.

Parallel to his burgeoning legal career, Tommy was actively involved in local volunteer work through the College of William and Mary. Norment served as an adjunct professor of law at William and Mary Law School. He served as on-campus attorney, and counselor and attorney to the president of William and Mary.

Norment entered into his first marriage to Mary Carlisle Humelsine, daughter of Carlisle Humelsine, the longtime president of the Colonial Williamsburg Foundation. Norment's connections to the prominent Humelsine family helped propel his political aspirations into reality.

Norment married his second wife, Richmond lobbyist Angie Bezik, in 2018.

== Political career ==
Initially a Democrat, Norment was elected to the James City County Board of Supervisors as a Republican and served from 1987 to 1991. He was elected to the state senate in 1991, defeating incumbent Democrat Bill Fears with 54% of the vote. Norment was unopposed for reelection in 1995, reelected with 63% of the vote in 1999, reelected with 62% of the vote in 2003, reelected unopposed in 2007 and 2011, reelected with 70% of the vote in 2015, and re-elected with 61.7% of the vote in 2019. Norment decided not to seek re-election in 2023 and officially retired from the Senate of Virginia on January 9, 2024. He led the Virginia Senate Republican caucus since 2007. As the longest serving Senate Republican Leader in Virginia history, Senator Norment has built a significant resume of achievements.

=== School Safety ===
In 1995, Senator Norment introduced and passed the legislation (SB874) that requires the immediate one-year expulsion of students who illegally bring firearms onto school property or to a school-sponsored event. Based on the facts of the specific case, school boards may determine that special circumstances exist and another disciplinary action or term of expulsion is appropriate.

In 2002, Norment introduced and passed the legislation (SB295) that implemented dedicated school safety personnel with law enforcement authority. This ensured every school in the Commonwealth had the opportunity to install a school resource officer in their schools. School resource officers are employed by school districts with the singular purpose of maintaining order and discipline, preventing crime, investigating violations of school board policies, and detaining students violating the law or school board policies on school property or at school-sponsored events and who is responsible solely for ensuring the safety, security, and welfare of all students, faculty, staff, and visitors in the assigned school.

In 2007, Norment introduced and passed SB927 which prohibited any adult who has been convicted of a sexually violent offense is guilty of a Class 6 felony if they enter or are present, during school school hours, upon any property they know or have reason to know is a public or private elementary or secondary school or child day center property, unless they (i) are lawfully voting; (ii) are a student enrolled at the school; or (iii) has received a court order allowing them to enter upon such property. That legislation was expanded in 2011 (SB1185) when Norment clarified that sex offenders were prohibited from school buses, and any property, public or private, during hours when such property is being used solely by a public or private elementary or secondary school for a school-related or school-sponsored activity.

In a crackdown on hazing, which has led to the deaths of Virginia students on more than one occasion, Senator Norment introduced and passed SB448 in 2014 which required the policies of any public school or public institution of higher education regarding hazing to be consistent with the model policies established by the Department of Education or the State Council of Higher Education for Virginia, as applicable, and directs such agencies to establish model policies with the Department of Criminal Justice Services.

In 2015 Norment introduced and passed SB1193 which required public and private institutions of higher education to include a prominent notation on the transcript of each student who has been suspended for, expelled, or withdraws from the institution while under investigation for an offense involving sexual violence. Following a tragic accident in York County that led to the deaths of three young teenagers, Senator Norment introduced and passed legislation that clarified driver education programs must teach students about the dangers of distracted driving and speeding. The bill further requires that students must provide evidence of a valid driver's license or driver privilege card prior to obtaining a pass to park on school property.

In 2021, a student in Loudoun County's school system sexually assaulted a female classmate in the bathroom of a high school. That student was transferred to another school while parents and law enforcement were left unnotified. The student again sexually assaulted a student in the new school and Loudoun County school administration again attempted to cover up the incident.

In an attempt to limit the number of violent acts perpetrated by students in schools, Senator Norment introduced and passed legislation (SB36 2022) that requires principals to report to law enforcement certain violent misdemeanor crimes and report to the parents of any minor student who is the specific object of such act that the incident has been reported to law enforcement. Previously, only felony offenses were required to be reported. The legislation provides exceptions to the reporting requirement for students with documented disabilities.

=== DUI/Traffic Safety ===
Norment was successful in orchestrating and passing the 1994 Omnibus Alcohol Safety Act (SB176), which serves as the foundation for all of Virginia's current DUI laws. The legislation provided for an immediate seven-day suspension of the driver's license of any person who is arrested for a DUI violation if such person (i) unreasonably refuses to submit to a breath test or (ii) registers 0.08 or higher on the breath test, upon issuance of a warrant by a magistrate. The bill imposes a 6-month license forfeiture and a $500 fine upon conviction. 1999 was an important year in the career of Senator Norment.

In 1991, he revisited Virginia's DUI laws with SB 841, working to make them stronger and more effective at deterring drunk driving and the lives lost because of it. This legislation made a third DUI offense within 10 years a Class 6 felony, with fourth and subsequent offenses carrying a one-year mandatory, minimum jail sentence.

Subsequently, in 2002 (SB148), Norment strengthened Virginia's “open container” laws by creating a rebuttable presumption that the driver has consumed an alcoholic beverage if (i) an open container is located in the passenger area of a motor vehicle, (ii) the alcoholic beverage in the open container has been at least partially removed, and (iii) the appearance, conduct, odor of alcohol, speech, or other physical characteristic of the driver may be reasonably associated with the consumption of an alcoholic beverage.

Norment introduced groundbreaking distracted driving legislation in Virginia in 2002 (SB597). This legislation added an instructional component concerning distracted driving to the requirements for driver education in the public schools and requires the Department of Motor Vehicles’ driver improvement clinic programs to include instruction concerning alcohol and drug abuse, aggressive driving, distracted driving, and motorcycle awareness.

In 2013 (SB1272), Norment again strengthened Virginia's DUI laws by making all subsequent felony DUI offenses a class 6 felony with a mandatory minimum term of imprisonment of one year with the same driver's license restrictions as for a third or subsequent DUI offense within 10 years, which means they can petition for reinstatement after five years since their last conviction.

=== Tourism ===
In 1999, Norment created the Virginia Tourism Authority (VTA)(SB1142), which is the leading entity in Virginia on tourism promotion to this day, although it is now called the Virginia Tourism Corporation (VTC). The VTC exists to support and encourage each locality to foster its own tourism development programs; enter into agreements with public or private entities that provide participating funding to establish tourism centers, encourage, stimulate, and support tourism in the Commonwealth by promoting, marketing, and advertising the Commonwealth's many tourist attractions and locations; encourage and stimulate the film industry in the Commonwealth. According to VTC, in 2021 travelers to Virginia spent $69 million per day which has contributed significantly to Virginia's ability to keep taxes and fees on Virginia's citizens so low.

In 2004, Norment introduced SB652 to increase the transient occupancy tax paid by tourists visiting the Historic Triangle region. In 2008, Norment changed the state code to ensure local Historic Triangle businesses had permanent representation on the Williamsburg Area Destination Marketing Committee, which is the entity responsible for managing the region's tourism funding. By requiring that members of the Williamsburg Chamber and Tourism Alliance as well as the executive director of the Williamsburg Hotel and Motel Association be included as members of the board.

In 2009 with SB1406, Norment repealed the entire existing charter of the City of Williamsburg and rewrote it from scratch to provide a new charter containing powers typically granted to cities. This measure brought the City of Williamsburg in line with the authorities provided to other independent cities across the Commonwealth.

In arguably the largest overhaul of Virginia's economic development structure in history, Senator Norment introduced and passed the Virginia Growth and Opportunity Act (SB449) which established the Virginia Growth and Opportunity Fund and the board to administer that fund specifically for regional economic and workforce development projects. The bill provides for regional councils to be established across the Commonwealth, consisting of representatives of government and the business and education communities. The councils submit applications to the GO Virginia Board for collaborative projects in their regions that enhance private-sector growth, competitiveness, and workforce development. A portion of the grant funds were slated to be awarded on a population-basis and a portion on a competitive basis. GO Virginia, as it is called, totally revitalized the way Virginia collaborated with private companies to grow the economy and it has proved successful as Virginia has been named the best state for business by CNBC on numerous occasions since the enactment of the Virginia Growth and Opportunity Act.

In 2018, Senator Norment introduced legislation (SB942) that significantly increased the amount of funding available for advertising and marketing the Historic Triangle as a tourist destination through the creation of a Historic Triangle sales and use tax. All of these tourism and marketing initiatives spearheaded by Senator Norment contribute, in turn, to the revenue available to Historic Triangle localities. According to the Virginian Pilot, in 2022 alone, tourism marketing efforts in the Historic Triangle region brought in $832 million in additional revenue that can be used to offset the tax burden on local residents or to improve schools, roads, law enforcement, or other public works and services historic triangle localities make available to their citizens. The bill also required localities to repeal recent ordinances raising the local transient occupancy, food and beverage, and admission taxes.

=== Electric Utility Restructuring/Energy ===
Arguably some of the most impactful legislation ever carried by Senator Norment, SB 1269 of the 1999 General Assembly Session marked the start of a new era in the way Virginians buy electric power. Starting in 2002, consumers in the Commonwealth had the ability to choose the entity from which they purchase electrical generation services. Implementing the deregulation of the generation component of electric service is a complex undertaking. For most of the 1900s, electric power was sold at retail by licensed public utilities that were granted service monopolies within specified areas while their rates and services were subject to regulation by the State Corporation Commission. In moving to retail competition for electricity generation services, Virginia joined a growing number of other states that sought to take advantage of the efficiencies and lower costs that a market-based system offers.

Two years later, Norment introduced SB1420 to establish the mechanism for establishing the rates for default electric service after the capped rate period ends. Effectively, the legislation provided SCC the authority to allow competitive bidding by electric utility companies as to who could provide the most affordable rates.

In 2012 with SB 413, Norment helped open the door in Virginia for energy companies to seriously invest in renewable energy research and development. For utilities that were able to show serious investment in Virginia, they became eligible to meet up to 20% of an RPS goal through qualified investment certificates issued by the State Corporation Commission. To qualify, such expenses needed to (i) be designed to enhance the participating utility's understanding of emerging energy technologies and their potential impact on and value to the utility's system and customer within the Commonwealth; (ii) promote economic development within the Commonwealth; (iii) supplement customer-driven alternative energy or energy efficiency initiatives; (iv) supplement alternative energy and energy efficiency initiatives at state or local governmental facilities in the Commonwealth; or (v) be designed to mitigate the environmental impacts of renewable energy projects. The measure also provided that a utility would receive double credit towards meeting the Renewable Energy Portfolio Standard Program's goals for energy from facilities in the Commonwealth fueled primarily by animal waste.

=== Second Chances ===
Senator Norment introduced and passed legislation in 2000 (SB329) that allows parolees to participate in the detention center incarceration program or the diversion center incarceration program upon a violation of parole, provided the violation was not a felony or Class 1 or 2 misdemeanor.

In 2018, Norment was the first Republican to introduce legislation decriminalizing marijuana in the Commonwealth. The legislation was defeated by the House of Delegates, but marked a change in attitudes across Virginia regarding the use of marijuana and preventing convictions for possession from ruining someone's life. Instead of a criminal conviction, Senator Norment's legislation would have required those found in possession to pay a fine, like a traffic ticket. It would not be for several more years that Virginia legalized the recreational use of marijuana.

=== Victims of Domestic Violence ===
Norment introduced and passed in 2002 legislation (SB 290) creating a statewide facilitator for victims of domestic violence within the Office of the Attorney General. The bill requires the Department of Criminal Justice Services to establish training standards and publish a model policy for law-enforcement personnel in the handling of domestic violence cases. The bill also requires that law-enforcement agencies enter information on protective orders into the Virginia Criminal Information Network (VCIN) immediately upon receipt. The bill removed the provision that marital rape cannot occur unless the spouses were living apart or there was bodily injury caused by force or violence. It also requires a law-enforcement officer investigating a complaint of family abuse to transport or arrange for the transportation of an abused person to a hospital, safe shelter, or magistrate. Lastly, the bill amends the witness protection program to include persons who may be in danger because of their cooperation with the investigation and prosecution to list the following crimes: assault and battery against a family or household member, a third misdemeanor conviction of certain sexual offenses, felony sexual assault, and violent felony sexual assault.

Two years later in 2004, Norment (SB237) created the Virginia Domestic Violence Victim Fund. The resources in the fund are used to support the prosecution of domestic violence cases and provide wrap-around services to victims.

Following the Northam Parole Board scandal in which the families of victims and prosecutors were not notified (as required by law) prior to the parole of violent offenders, Sen. Norment introduced and passed legislation during a Special Session in 2021 that clarifies the Parole Board and its chairperson are required to notify the Department of Corrections and the Commonwealth's attorney at least 21 business days prior to an inmate's release and that no release date shall be set sooner than 30 business days from the date the Department of Corrections receives notification from the Chairman of the Parole Board.

=== Ethics/Conflict of Interest Act ===
Norment was successful in pushing through a series of changes that were unpopular among General Assembly members in an effort to foster more transparency for the citizens of Virginia. SB512 requires a member of the General Assembly to disclose in their annual disclosure of personal interests any salary and wages in excess of $10,000 paid to them or their immediate family for employment with a state or local government or advisory agency. The measure brought an unprecedented level of transparency to the General Assembly and laid the groundwork to curtail conflicts of interest in Virginia's government.

In 2014, Norment introduced SB649 which established the Virginia Conflict of Interest and Ethics Advisory Council composed of 15 members with the objective of reviewing and publishing the disclosure forms filed by lobbyists and persons subject to the conflict of interests acts and provide formal opinions and informal advice, education, and training. The bill requires the filing of disclosure forms twice a year, prohibits tangible gifts with a value of more than $250 or a combination of gifts with a value of more than $250 to certain officers and employees of state or local governmental or advisory agencies or to legislators from a lobbyist; a lobbyist's principal; or a person, business or organization who is a party to or seeking to become a party to certain governmental contracts. The bill also reduces the disclosure threshold provision from $10,000 to $5,000, and requires the disclosure of gifts to immediate family members. Finally, the bill provides that the provisions of the conflict of interest acts do not preclude prosecution for any criminal law violation including bribery. Norment amended the legislation in 2015 to lower the gift threshold to $100, clarifies that attendance at a widely attended event of more than 25 persons does not constitute a gift, and requires disclosure of gifts or entertainment in excess of $50.

In 2016 Norment amended the Conflict of Interest Acts once again to ensure lobbyists were subject to the same disclosure requirements as government employees and legislators.

=== Education ===
Norment introduced and passed SB1223 in 2013 that entirely revamped the evaluation and grievance process for teachers and certain administrators within Virginia's public school system. The bill requires teachers, assistant principals, and principals to be evaluated every year, either formally or informally, and such evaluations to include student academic progress as a significant component and an overall summative rating. The bill allows local school boards to increase from three to five years the term of probationary service required before a teacher becomes eligible for a continuing contract. This legislation directly ties a teacher evaluation to the performance of their students which leads to an improved roster of teachers and better student outcomes.

Norment carried dozens of budget amendments throughout his tenure to provide increased funding for university programs, staff, and capital project improvements. Norment secured funding to build the Virginia Peninsula Community College Historic Triangle campus, the funding for the Integrity Science Center and the School of Education at William and Mary, and a number of new buildings at Virginia Military Institute.

=== Tax Relief ===
In 2019, Senator Norment carried legislation (SB1372) raising the standard deduction on income taxes for the first time in more than a decade. The bill increases the standard deduction to $4,500 for single individuals and $9,000 for married couples filing jointly. At the time, the standard deduction had been capped at $3,000 and $6,000 respectively. Additionally, the bill provided a tax refund of up to $110 for individuals and $220 for married couples filing jointly. Lastly, the legislation established the Taxpayer Relief Fund where additional tax revenues generated by the Tax Cuts and Jobs Act (TCJA) would be deposited and used to enact permanent or temporary tax reform measures.

=== Health ===
With vape products entering the market, the number of young children purchasing nicotine products skyrocketed across the Commonwealth. As a result, Senator Norment introduced and passed SB1727 in 2019 that, for the first time in decades, increased the age limit to purchase nicotine products from 18 years of age to 21 years of age. This included traditional tobacco products like cigarettes and cigars, as well as newer vaping products.

=== Controversies ===
In January 2001, Norment was charged with driving under the influence after he was pulled over on Interstate 64 outside Richmond with a blood alcohol content of 0.10. He apologized to his constituents and colleagues from the Senate floor two days later, saying, "I offer no excuses, no avoidances of responsibility. I do, however, offer my sincere and contrite apologies for any embarrassment or shadow I may have cast over the integrity and dignity of this body."

In 2008, Norment requested an opinion from Attorney General Bob McDonnell that "at no time will I assume a relationship of 'attorney-client' that would result in the exercising of any attorney client privilege or any work product privilege. It is my understanding the College would continue to rely upon legal services through the Office of Attorney General." McDonnell concluded, "it is my opinion that you do not have an impermissible conflict of interest under the Act based on the facts herein", writing, "I affirm the intention that your relationship with the College will not be that of attorney and client."

Attorney General Ken Cuccinelli released the Norment opinion to the public and issued a press release on September 2, 2011. The press release read: "Recent public statements made by state Senator Thomas Norment suggest that for the past several years, he assumed a role of legal counsel for the College of William & Mary.

In April 2015, a 2013 letter from Norment to the Virginia State Bar saying that he had previously had an extramarital relationship with a female lobbyist was made public. Norment was responding to allegations from an unsatisfied legal client, Christopher Burruss, who attempted to extort him by revealing Norment's affair. Rather than comply with Burruss's demands, Norment turned the evidence over to the State Bar. Burruss was convicted of extortion and sentenced to two years in prison. Norment reported that his marriage had recovered from the affair, but he later divorced. The lobbyist's name, Angie Bezik, was withheld from news reports until 2018, when Norment announced he was engaged to marry her. He restricted press access to the Virginia Senate in 2016, a move seen as catalyzed by the coverage of his affair.

In August 2015, Norment's name and personal information appeared on the hacked Ashley Madison servers, showing one payment of $68.99 and two payments of $79. Clients of the dating service were required to pay to initiate a conversation with another client, and male clients paid to read the first messages from female clients. Norment declined to comment.

In 2019, former students of Norment's at William and Mary accused him of teaching racist material and making racist and transphobic statements in class.

In February 2019, it was revealed that Norment was an editor of the 1968 Virginia Military Institute yearbook that showed students in Ku Klux Klan attire and blackface and with racially offensive nicknames, which came to light in the context of the 2019 Virginia political crisis. Norment does not appear in the photos and issued a statement saying he condemned the use of blackface and said his role was ensuring writers and photographers made their submissions on time and that he was "still culpable, but it is by association with a team that produced that yearbook with those photos". He pointed out that page 236 of the same yearbook shows he supported VMI's racial integration in 1968, and that he led an effort to enroll women there in 1997.

== Notes ==
Senate of Virginia
Preceded by William Fears	Member of the Virginia Senate from the 3rd district 1992–2024	Succeeded by Chris Head
Preceded by Dick Saslaw	Minority Leader of the Virginia Senate; 2008–2012	Succeeded by Dick Saslaw
Preceded by Dick Saslaw	Majority Leader of the Virginia Senate; 2012–2014	Succeeded by Dick Saslaw
Preceded by Dick Saslaw	Minority Leader of the Virginia Senate; 2014	Succeeded by Dick Saslaw
Preceded by Dick Saslaw	Majority Leader of the Virginia Senate; 2014–2020	Succeeded by Dick Saslaw
Preceded by Dick Saslaw	Minority Leader of the Virginia Senate; 2020–2024	Succeeded by Ryan McDougle
