= Widow's succession =

Succession of a widow filling political office after the death of a spouse

Widow's succession is a political practice prominent in some countries commonly used in the early part of the 20th century, by which a politician who died in office was directly succeeded by his widow, either through election or direct appointment to the seat. Many of the earliest women to hold political office in the modern era attained their positions through this practice.

There have also sometimes been instances of politicians being directly succeeded by their wives when they had merely stepped down from office rather than dying, but this is not the same phenomenon as widow's succession.

== Overview ==
In earlier years, women who held office through widow's succession rarely became prominent as politicians in their own right, but were regarded merely as placeholders whose primary role was to retain a seat and a vote for the party rather than risk a protracted fight for the nomination between elections. The practice was also sometimes seen as a way to provide the woman with financial support due her family's primary income declining.

The expectation was that a widow would serve only until the next election, at which time she would resign and allow her party to select a new candidate. Upon the retirement of Effiegene Locke Wingo from the United States House of Representatives in 1932, the New York Sun wrote,

Some of the women who have inherited a seat in Congress have demonstrated their individual ability, but of most of them it can be said that they submitted with dignity and good taste to a false code of chivalry, served unostentatiously and departed the Capitol quietly, wondering what the men who invented the term-by-inheritance thought they were doing.

In one unusual Canadian instance, Martha Black succeeded her husband George Black in the House of Commons of Canada when he had not died, but merely resigned temporarily for health reasons; in the next election, George returned to office and Martha retired. Another unusual circumstance occurred in the United States when Katherine G. Langley was elected to her still-living husband John W. Langley's former congressional seat after he was convicted of selling alcohol during Prohibition.

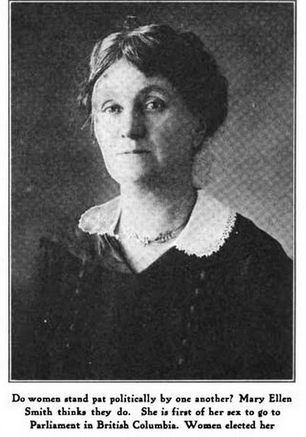
Mary Ellen Smith was the first female cabinet minister (1921) and speaker of a legislature (1928) in Canada and the wider British Empire.

With the evolving role of women in politics, however, a number of women who first took office under widow's succession went on to build long and distinguished careers in their own right. Margaret Chase Smith became the longest-serving woman in the history of the United States Senate and the first woman ever to have her name placed in nomination for the Presidency of the United States at a major party's convention, serving 9 years in the House after replacing her deceased husband, and then serving in the Senate for 24 more years. Edith Nourse Rogers became the longest-serving woman in the history of the United States House of Representatives (until finally being surpassed in 2018), and Mary Ellen Smith earned the distinction of becoming the first woman ever appointed to a cabinet position, as well as the first woman ever to become speaker of a legislature, in both Canada and the entire British Empire.

In Sri Lanka, Sirimavo Bandaranaike, who succeeded her assassinated husband, was a long-serving prime minister and party leader.

While widows are occasionally still appointed or elected to political positions following their husbands' deaths, the practice is not as common in the modern era, in which women have been able to take on increasingly prominent roles in politics based on their own talents and experience rather than as "placeholders". Additionally, some figures, such as Sonia Gandhi in India and Grace MacInnis in Canada, have happened to hold political office and to be the widow of an earlier officeholder, but are not true "widow's successions" as they were not their husband's immediate successor.

== Notable widow's successions ==
=== Australia ===
- Millie Peacock, first woman elected to the Parliament of Victoria; she said when she retired: "Parliament is no place for a woman."

=== Canada ===
- Cora Taylor Casselman
- Jennifer Cossitt
- Eloise Jones
- Margaret Mary Macdonald
- Sarah Ramsland
- Margaret Rideout
- Jean Yip

=== Indonesia ===
- Sherly Tjoanda was elected as the governor of North Maluku after replacing her husband's, Benny Laos, candidacy, who died in a speedboat fire.

=== Ireland ===
Includes politicians from the Irish Free State and Republic of Ireland.

- Caitlín Brugha (succeeded Cathal Brugha in Waterford in 1923; he had been elected to Waterford–Tipperary East seat and then died in combat in the Irish Civil War)
- Bridget Rice (succeeded Eamon Rice in Monaghan, 1932)
- Mary Reynolds (succeeded Patrick Reynolds in Leitrim–Sligo when he was murdered during the 1932 election campaign)
- Bridget Redmond (succeeded William Redmond in Waterford, 1933)
- Honor Crowley (succeeded Frederick Crowley in Kerry South, 1945)
- Mary Ryan (succeeded Martin Ryan in Tipperary, 1944)
- Celia Lynch (succeeded James B. Lynch in Dublin South-Central, 1954)
- Joan Burke (succeeded James Burke in Roscommon, 1964)
- Sheila Galvin (succeeded John Galvin in Cork Borough, 1964)
- Eileen Desmond (succeeded Dan Desmond in Cork Mid, 1965)
- Eileen Lemass (unsuccessfully contested her husband Noel Lemass' seat in Dublin South-West, 1976; later elected to the Dáil in Dublin Ballyfermot, 1977)

=== Japan ===
- Keiko Nagaoka
- Nobuko Okashita

=== Malaysia ===
- Linda Tsen, elected in the 2010 Batu Sapi by-election after the seat had been vacant upon the death of the incumbent, Edmund Chong Ket Wah, who was Tsen's husband
- Mastura Mohd Yazid, elected in the 2016 Kuala Kangsar by-election after the seat had been vacant upon the death of the incumbent Wan Mohammad Khair-il Anuar, who was Mastura's husband
- Irene Mary Chang Oi Ling succeeded her husband Wong Ho Leng in the Bukit Assek state constituency in Sarawak

=== New Zealand ===
- Mary Grigg first female MP of the National Party.
- Elizabeth McCombs first female MP, succeeded her husband James McCombs in 1933, following his death, and was in turn succeeded by their son Terry McCombs in 1935.
- Iriaka Rātana first female Māori MP.

=== Philippines ===
In the Philippines, a candidate that has died up until midday of election day can be substituted by someone who has the same surname as him or her, almost always the spouse.

- Remedios Fortich, elected on the 1947 special election, succeeded her husband Carlos Fortich Sr. in Bukidnon's at-large district.
- Gloria Tabiana, elected on the 1965 special election, succeeded her husband Ramon Tabiana in Iloilo's 3rd district.
- Magnolia Antonino, elected on the 1967 Senate election, succeeded her husband Gaudencio Antonino who died on the eve of the election.

=== United Kingdom ===
- Margaret Wintringham succeeded Thomas Wintringham in Louth, Lincolnshire, 1921 by-election
- Agnes Hardie succeeded George Hardie in Glasgow Springburn, 1937 by-election
- Beatrice Rathbone succeeded John Rathbone in Bodmin, 1941 by-election
- Lena Jeger succeeded Santo Jeger in Holborn and St Pancras South, 1953 by-election
- Irene Adams succeeded Allen Adams in Paisley North, 1990 by-election
- Trish Law succeeded Peter Law in Blaenau Gwent, 2006 by-election (Welsh Assembly)
- Gill Furniss succeeded Harry Harpham in Sheffield Brightside and Hillsborough, 2016 by-election

==== MPs who resigned from office ====
Historically, women would get into politics by taking the seat of their husband. Nancy Astor became the first British female Member of Parliament after replacing her husband Waldorf, MP for Plymouth Sutton, when he was appointed to the House of Lords.

=== United States ===
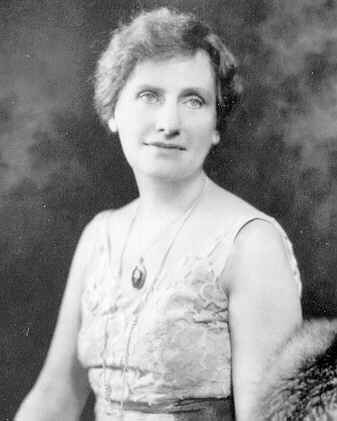
Nellie Tayloe Ross of Wyoming was the first woman elected governor of a U.S. state.

The following is a list of the women in the U.S. Senate and House of Representatives who have succeeded their spouses in Congress.

- Maryon Pittman Allen (Senate)
- Elizabeth Andrews (House)
- Jean Spencer Ashbrook (House)
- Irene Baker (House)
- Lindy Boggs (House)
- Veronica Boland (House)
- Frances Bolton (House)
- Mary Bono (House)
- Vera Buchanan (House)
- Jocelyn Burdick (Senate)
- Sala Burton (House)
- Vera Bushfield (Senate)
- Beverly Byron (House)
- Katharine Byron (House)
- Lois Capps (House)
- Hattie Caraway (Senate)
- Marguerite Church (House)
- Marian Clarke (House)
- Cardiss Collins (House)
- Jo Ann Emerson (House)
- Willa McCord Blake Eslick (House)
- Elizabeth Farrington (House)
- Willa Fulmer (House)
- Elizabeth Hawley Gasque (House)
- Kathryn Granahan (House)
- Florence Reville Gibbs (House)
- Muriel Humphrey (Senate)
- Florence Prag Kahn (House)
- Elizabeth Kee (House)
- Catherine Small Long (House)
- Rose McConnell Long (Senate)
- Doris Matsui (House)
- Clara McMillan (House)
- Maurine Neuberger (Senate)
- Mae Nolan (House)
- Catherine Dorris Norrell (House)
- Pearl Peden Oldfield (House)
- Shirley Neil Pettis (House)
- Louise Goff Reece (House)
- Corinne Boyd Riley (House)
- Edith Nourse Rogers (House)
- Edna Simpson (House)
- Margaret Chase Smith (House, subsequently elected to Senate)
- Leonor Sullivan (House)
- Lera Millard Thomas (House)
- Effiegene Locke Wingo (House)

Nellie Tayloe Ross was the first female governor of a U.S. state, serving as Governor of Wyoming from 1925 to 1927. Her husband William B. Ross was governor from 1923 until his death in October 1924, at which point secretary of state Frank Lucas succeeded him. Nellie Tayloe Ross was elected to replace her husband in a November 1924 special election.

Being appointed sheriff to succeed a dead husband happened a number of times by the 1920s. Florence Shoemaker Thompson, of Daviess County, Kentucky, was the first female sheriff to carry out an execution, and oversaw the hanging of Rainey Bethea in 1936, which was the last public execution in Kentucky. Andrea Seastrand succeeded her husband Eric Seastrand as the member of the California State Assembly for the 29th district in 1990. When Joseph Crouch died in 1989, his wife Joyce Crouch replaced him in the 22nd district in the Virginia House of Delegates.

In January 2001, Jean Carnahan was appointed to the Senate to replace her husband Mel Carnahan, who had been posthumously elected to the Senate in November 2000 after dying in a plane crash three weeks earlier. In 2007, Niki Tsongas was elected to a House seat that was held by her deceased husband Paul Tsongas between 1975 and 1979.

In 2015, Deborah Dingell became the first wife to succeed her living husband in the House of Representatives after John Dingell Jr. retired in 2014. He had succeeded his deceased father, John Dingell Sr. in a special election for the same seat in 1955. As of 2026, the Dingell family has represented the southeastern Michigan area for 97 consecutive years.

In 2021, Julia Letlow ran for and won a House seat in Louisiana that was vacant due to the death of her husband Luke Letlow the year prior. Unusually, Luke Letlow died before actually being sworn in to office, having won an election to succeed a retiring Congressman. The same year, Texas congressman Ron Wright died in office. His wife Susan Wright ran in the special election to succeed him but came in second place to Jake Ellzey.

In 2026, Darline Graham was appointed to her brother Lindsey Graham's Senate seat, the first time someone was appointed to replace their sibling in the Senate. Lindsey Graham never married, so Darline Graham's status as his next of kin and appointed replacement was compared to or called widow's succession.

== See also ==
- Political family
- Women in the United States Senate
- Women in the United States House of Representatives
