= 2013 Virginia's 31st House of Delegates district election =

Virginia's 31st House of Delegates district election, 2013, held November 5, 2013, was a contest between incumbent Republican Scott Lingamfelter and Democratic challenger Jeremy McPike. McPike ran on the issues of quality of life, transportation, education, and energy. Lingamfelter wanted to streamline government.

== Results ==
Virginia's 31st House of Delegates district election, 2013
Party	Candidate	Votes	%	±%
Republican	Scott Lingamfelter (inc.)	11,508	50.4%	
Democratic	Jeremy McPike	11,280	49.4%	
Write-ins		45		
Turnout		22,833		
Republican hold		Swing		

== See also ==
- Virginia's 31st House of Delegates district
