= Elizabeth Guzmán =

American politician

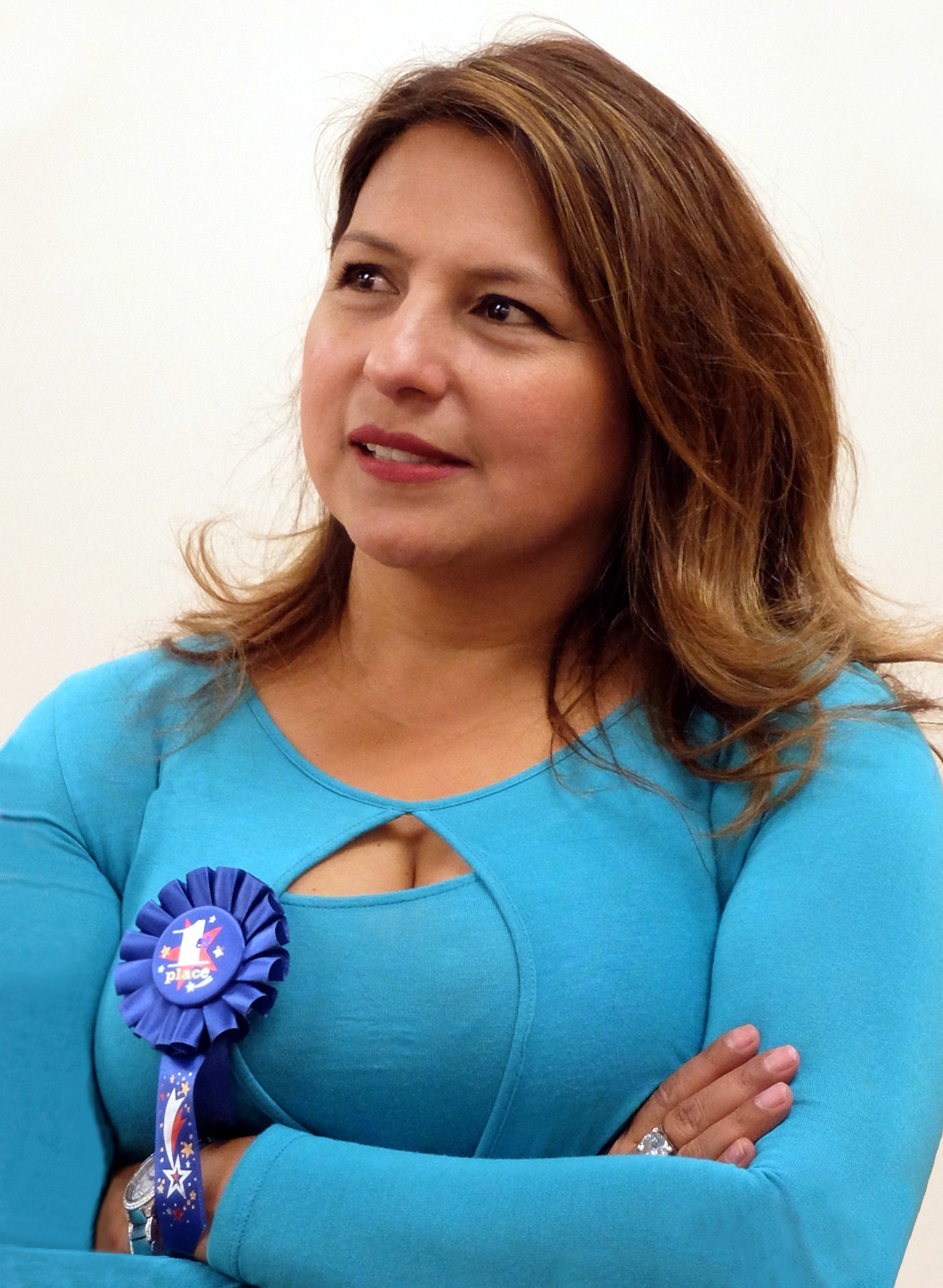

Member of the Virginia House of Delegates
- Incumbent
- Assumed office January 14, 2026
- Preceded by: Ian Lovejoy
- Constituency: 22nd district
- In office January 10, 2018 – January 10, 2024
- Preceded by: Scott Lingamfelter
- Succeeded by: Delores Riley Oates (redistricted)
- Constituency: 31st district

Personal details
- Born: February 13, 1973 (age 53) Lima, Peru
- Party: Democratic
- Spouse: Carlos Guzmán
- Children: 4
- Education: Northern Virginia Community College (attended); Capella University (BA); American University (MPA); University of Southern California (MSW)
- Website: Campaign website

Elizabeth Rosalina Guzmán (born February 13, 1973) is an American politician and social worker serving as a member of the Virginia House of Delegates for the 22nd district since 2026. A member of the Democratic Party, she previously served as a member of Virginia's House of Delegates from 2018 to 2024. Guzmán was first elected in 2017 after defeating incumbent Republican Scott Lingamfelter, and was re-elected in 2025 after defeating incumbent Republican Ian Lovejoy.

As a Delegate, Guzmán passed legislation to repeal Virginia's prohibition on public sector collective bargaining and provide paid sick leave to home health care workers.

Guzmán was Virginia co-chair of the Bernie Sanders 2020 presidential campaign. In June 2020, Guzmán was elected at the Democratic Party of Virginia State Convention to represent the Commonwealth of Virginia at the DNC.

== Early life ==
Born in Peru, Guzmán immigrated to the United States and became a social worker.

== Career ==
In 2017, Guzmán ran for state delegate and unseated eight-term incumbent Republican Delegate Scott Lingamfelter.

Guzmán and Hala Ayala became the first Hispanic women elected to the House, both in Virginia's November 2017 election. Their terms began in January 2018.

Guzmán was invited by Nancy Pelosi to deliver the Spanish language response to the 2018 State of the Union Address,

As a Delegate, Guzmán passed legislation to repeal Virginia's Jim Crow-era prohibition on public sector collective bargaining and provide paid sick leave to home health care workers.

Guzmán is a progressive, and has criticized the Virginia Democratic Party for its traditionally centrist ideology.

Guzmán worked as a Court Appointed Service Advocate for CASA CIS, a nonprofit.

In 2023, Guzman voted against stiffening penalties for drug dealers if a user dies of a drug overdose.

=== 2021 lieutenant governor campaign ===
Guzmán announced her candidacy for Lieutenant Governor in October 2020. Guzman came in third place in the first straw poll of the cycle at a Hunter Mill District Democratic Committee meeting, behind 1st place Sam Rasoul and 2nd place Sean Perryman. On April 17, Guzman withdrew from the lieutenant governor's race to focus on her reelection campaign for delegate.

=== 2023 Virginia senate campaign ===
In December 2022, Guzmán announced her intention to challenge incumbent senator Jeremy McPike in the Democratic primary. She earned 49.76% of the vote, but conceded rather than go to a recount.

=== 2024 congressional campaign ===
In November 2023, Guzmán announced her candidacy to replace Abigail Spanberger in Virginia's 7th congressional district. She had been endorsed by the Latino Victory Fund, Virginia AFL-CIO, Progressive Campaign Change Committee, American Federation of State, County and Municipal Employees, and the Amalgamated Transit Union. However, she placed second in the primary, losing to Eugene Vindman.

=== 2025 Virginia house campaign ===
Guzmán again ran for the Virginia House of Delegates in 2025, this time in the 22nd district. She defeated Republican incumbent Ian Lovejoy by nearly ten points, reflecting the broader Democratic victory in the 2025 House of Delegates election.

=== Electoral history ===
| Date | Election | Candidate | Party | Votes | % |
|---|---|---|---|---|---|
| June 13, 2017 | Primary | Elizabeth R. Guzman | Democratic | 3,062 | 52.2 |
| June 13, 2017 | Primary | Sara E. Townsend | Democratic | 2,809 | 47.8 |
| Nov 7, 2017 | General | Elizabeth R. Guzman | Democratic | 15,466 | 53.99 |
| Nov 7, 2017 | General | L. Scott Lingamfelter | Republican | 12,658 | 44.19 |
| Nov 7, 2017 | General | Nathan D. Larson | Independent | 481 | 1.68 |
| Nov 7, 2017 | General | Write Ins | | 39 | 0.14 |
| Nov 5, 2019 | General | Elizabeth R. Guzman | Democratic | 14,630 | 52.63 |
| Nov 5, 2019 | General | Darrell H. "D.J." Jordan, Jr. | Republican | 13,125 | 47.22 |
| Nov 2, 2021 | General | Elizabeth R. Guzman | Democratic | 18,384 | 52.0 |
| Nov 2, 2021 | General | Ben Baldwin | Republican | 16,888 | 47.8 |
| June 20, 2023 | Primary | Jeremy S. McPike | Democratic | 6,269 | 50.24 |
| June 20, 2023 | Primary | Elizabeth R Guzman | Democratic | 6,209 | 49.76 |

== Awards ==
In May 2019, Guzman was given “The First” award from Latino Victory Fund. The Library of Virginia selected her as one of the changemakers in its "New Virginians" program.

== See also ==
- 2017 Virginia House of Delegates election
- 2019 Virginia House of Delegates election
