= H. Selwyn Smith =

American jurist and politician

2nd Virginia Secretary of Public Safety
- In office July 1, 1976 – July 1, 1980
- Governor: Mills Godwin; John N. Dalton
- Preceded by: Wayne A. Whitham
- Succeeded by: T. Rodman Layman

Member of the Virginia Senate from the 29th district
- In office January 12, 1972 – January 14, 1976
- Preceded by: Lloyd C. Bird
- Succeeded by: Chuck Colgan

Personal details
- Born: Harold Selwyn Smith; July 19, 1922 Manassas, Virginia, U.S.
- Died: August 24, 2013 (aged 91) Manassas, Virginia, U.S.
- Party: Democratic
- Spouse: Virginia Margaret Busk
- Education: Virginia Tech (BS); University of Virginia (LLB)

Military service
- Allegiance: United States
- Branch/service: United States Army
- Years of service: 1943–1947
- Rank: Captain
- Battles/wars: World War II

Harold Selwyn Smith (July 19, 1922 – August 24, 2013) was an American jurist and politician who served as a member of the Senate of Virginia and as Virginia's Secretary of Public Safety. He resigned the latter position effective July 1, 1980 to take up a position on a Virginia Circuit Court. He died in Manassas, Virginia at age 91.

Senate of Virginia
Preceded by Lloyd C. Bird	Virginia Senator for the 29th District; 1972–1976	Succeeded by Charles J. Colgan
Political offices
Preceded by Wayne A. Whitham	Virginia Secretary of Public Safety; 1976–1980	Succeeded by T. Rodman Layman
