= 2003 Virginia's 31st House of Delegates district election =

Virginia's 31st House of Delegates district election, 2003, held 4 November 2003, was a contest between incumbent Republican Scott Lingamfelter and Democratic challenger David G. Brickley, who had served as director of the Virginia Department of Conservation and Recreation under Governor James S. Gilmore III.

== Results ==
Virginia's 31st House of Delegates district election, 2003
Party	Candidate	Votes	%	±%
Republican	Scott Lingamfelter (inc.)	6,787	55.0%	
Democratic	David G. Brickley	5,556	45.0%	
Write-ins		2		
Turnout		12,345		
Republican hold		Swing		

== See also ==
- Virginia's 31st House of Delegates district
