= 2011 Virginia's 31st House of Delegates district election =

Virginia's 31st House of Delegates district election, 2011, held 8 November 2011, was a contest between incumbent Republican Scott Lingamfelter and Democratic challenger Roy Coffey. Coffey argued that legislators should concentrate on spending money on people rather than industries. Lingamfelter argued, "Our nation is in peril. There are people that believe today that the constitution is nothing more than a nice collection of suggestions. Folks, the constitution is not a collection of suggestions it is the law of this land."

== Results ==
Virginia's 31st House of Delegates district election, 2011
Party	Candidate	Votes	%	±%
Republican	Scott Lingamfelter (inc.)	8,435	58.6%	
Democratic	Roy Coffey	5,930	41.2%	
Write-ins		25		
Turnout		14,390		
Republican hold		Swing		

== See also ==
- Virginia's 31st House of Delegates district
