= 2007 Virginia's 31st House of Delegates district election =

Virginia's 31st House of Delegates district election, 2007, held November 6, 2007, was a contest between incumbent Republican Scott Lingamfelter and Democratic challenger Bill Day, a part-time psychotherapist, in the 2007 general election which was scheduled for October 6. Day began sending out mass mailings shortly after Labor Day introducing himself to the voters, and in October began sending out negative advertisements against Lingamfelter, accusing him of being aligned with southern Virginia Republicans who were failing to address northern Virginia traffic congestion.

== Issues ==
=== Toll roads ===
Lingamfelter is a supporter of toll roads, having introduced a bill allowing tolls on any Virginia interstate highway, with the proceeds being set aside to "[p]ay or finance all or part of the costs of programs or projects, including without limitation the costs of planning, operation, maintenance and improvements incurred in connection with the toll facility provided that such allocations shall be limited to programs and projects that are reasonably related to or benefit the users of the toll facility"; this is a position for which he has been attacked by Day in campaign literature as a contradiction of his self-portrayal as a fiscal conservative. Lingamfelter believes that tolls are a logical way to link road use with road financing. He defended his decision by saying, "We need to build some roads, okay?" He also pointed out that tolls capture revenue from out-of-state travelers. Lingamfelter's toll bills require the use of automated toll collection.

Despite the criticism, Lingamfelter's website calls attention to the toll bills, saying, "Virginians who travel throughout the country pay tolls in other states which go to make necessary improvements to the highway systems within those states. Travelers who come to our Commonwealth leave behind no money as they pass through—money that could go to relieve congestion and improve the conditions of Virginia’s roads. This bill would enable the collection of tolls in Virginia that will go back into improving our roads".

=== Abusive driver fees ===
Lingamfelter supported the enactment of the Virginia abusive driver fees. After citizens began protesting the fees (which do not apply to out-of-state drivers), Lingamfelter initially defended the fees, in an opinion piece in the Fauquier Times-Democrat and Potomac News. However, he changed his position in the face of a growing political firestorm, sending mailings to signatories of the online petition against the fees explaining his reversal. Day sent mailings to voters criticizing Lingamfelter for supporting the fees in the first place, describing them as "abusive driver taxes," a reference to the revenue-generating purpose of the fees.

=== Immigration ===
Lingamfelter accused Day of being insincere in his opposition to illegal immigration. Lingamfelter opposes providing state and local governmental services to illegals. Day focuses more on sanctions for employers of illegals, saying that this issue comes down to jobs.

=== Personal issues ===
Lingamfelter also pointed out that while Day describes himself as a licensed counselor and avid hunter, Day's counseling license actually has expired, and he has not had a hunting license in the past 15 months. Day responded that he let his counseling license expire in order to devote himself to the campaign and that he has switched to fox hunting and fishing.

== Results ==
Virginia's 31st House of Delegates district election, 2007
| Party | Candidate | Votes | % | ±% |
|---|---|---|---|---|
| Republican | Scott Lingamfelter (inc.) | 7,722 | 55.3% | |
| Democratic | Bill Day | 6,210 | 44.5% | |
| Write-ins | | 34 | | |
| Turnout | | 13,966 | | |
| Republican hold | | Swing | | |

== See also ==
- Virginia's 31st House of Delegates district
