= Charles J. Colgan =

American politician

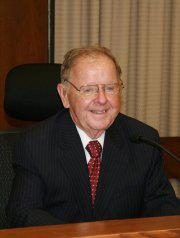
- Colgan in 2011

President pro tempore of the Virginia Senate
- In office January 28, 2014 – June 12, 2014
- Preceded by: Walter Stosch
- Succeeded by: Walter Stosch
- In office January 9, 2008 – January 11, 2012
- Preceded by: John Chichester
- Succeeded by: Walter Stosch

Member of the Virginia Senate from the 29th district
- In office January 14, 1976 – January 13, 2016
- Preceded by: H. Selwyn Smith
- Succeeded by: Jeremy McPike

Personal details
- Born: Charles Joseph Colgan; September 25, 1926 Frostburg, Maryland, U.S.
- Died: January 3, 2017 (aged 90) Aldie, Virginia, U.S.
- Party: Democratic
- Spouses: Agnes Loretto Footen (m. 1948; died 2001) Carmen Alicia Bernal (m. 2008)

Military service
- Allegiance: United States
- Branch/service: United States Army; Army Air Forces; United States Air Force
- Years of service: 1945–1950
- Rank: Sergeant
- Battles/wars: World War II; European theater

Charles Joseph Colgan (September 25, 1926 – January 3, 2017) was an American politician and businessman. He served for forty years in the Senate of Virginia for the 29th district, with a brief period as the President pro tempore.

== Background ==
Orphaned at the age of 5, Colgan was raised by his grandparents on a farm in Garrett County, Maryland.

Upon his graduation from high school Colgan enlisted in the United States Army Air Forces and was called to active duty in February 1945. After graduation from basic training Colgan was stationed in Italy as part of a maintenance flight crew on a C-47. After completing his military service Colgan returned to Maryland where he met and married his wife Agnes. In 1948, Colgan and his wife moved to Washington, D.C. He trained as an airplane mechanic working for Capital Airlines and then obtained his commercial pilots license.

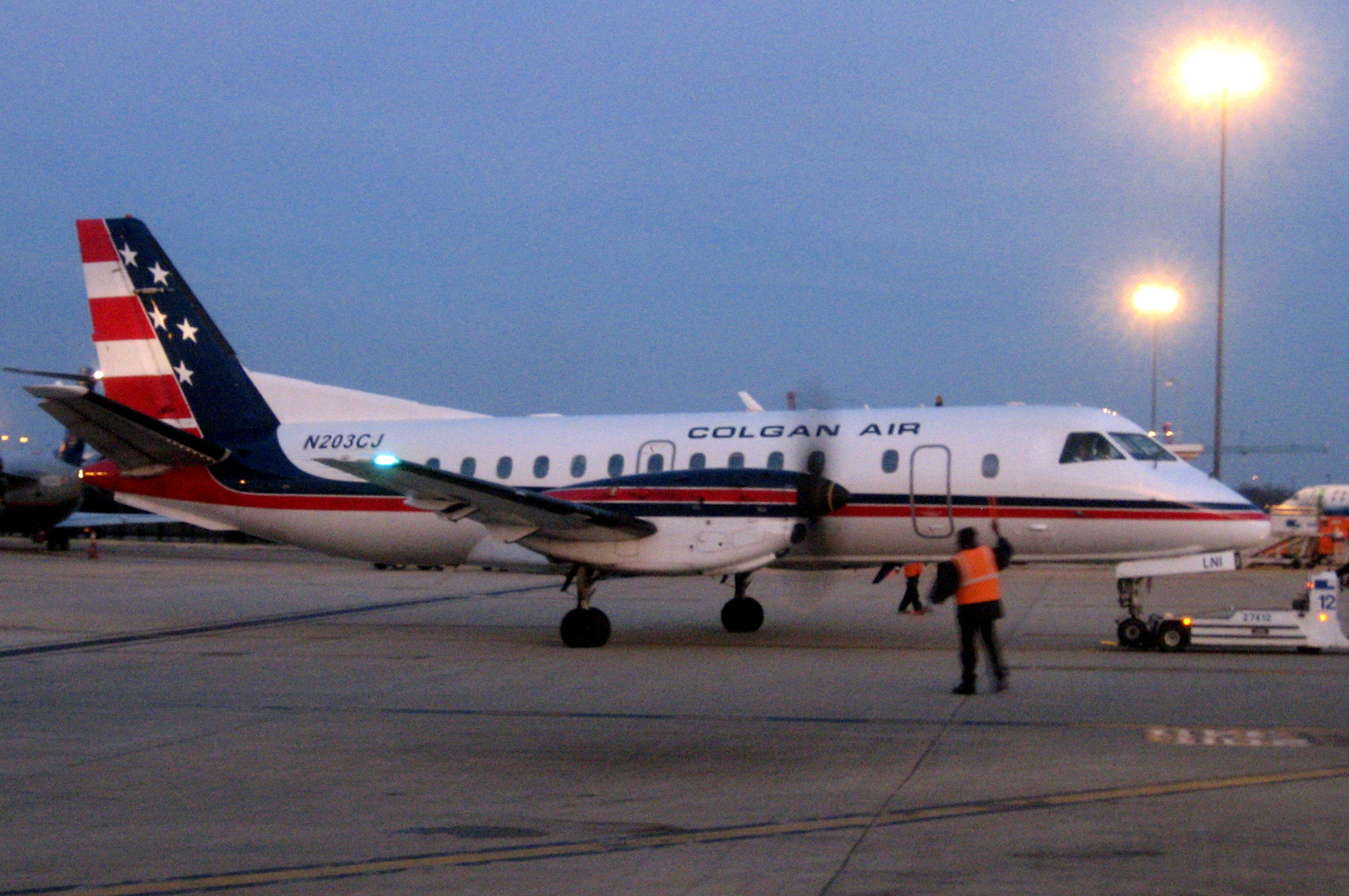
Colgan Air Livery, Saab 340B

After flying as a corporate pilot, Colgan moved to Manassas, Virginia, in 1964 and formed Colgan Air operating as a flight school and fixed-base operation. In 1968, Colgan expanded his business to include a regional airline which he sold to Presidential Airways in 1986. After the bankruptcy of Presidential, around 1991, Senator Colgan and his son Mike restarted air service under the new name Colgan Air with one aircraft. Colgan and his family sold the airline in 2007 to Pinnacle Airlines.

At the time of the sale, Colgan Air had grown from a few employees and one aircraft to 1,100 employees, 50 aircraft, and 350 flights daily to 53 cities in the North East and Texas.

== Awards ==
- 1980, Virginia Aviation Hall of Fame.
- 2003, Turboprop Airline Executive of the Year Award for his accomplishments in the airline industry.
- 2005, Virginia Senator of the Year by the Virginia Transit Association.
- 2011, George Mason University (GMU) honored Colgan for his work on the development of the GMU Prince William Campus.
- Northern Virginia Community College Medallion Award for his work in building and developing the college system.
- Melvin Jones Award (the highest award for community service) from the Park West Lions Club.
- The Northern Virginia Community College Manassas Campus has a building named in honor of Senator Colgan for his work on improving higher education, Colgan Hall.
- Fox 5 Hometown Hero Award
- Prince William County Schools named their 12th high school after Colgan. The school opened in August 2016.
- Statue of Senator Colgan Dedicated at Colgan Hall located at George Mason Campus in Manassas, VA

== Political career ==
Colgan's public service began in 1972 when he was elected to the Prince William County Board of Supervisors, where he served as chairman for one year. In 1975, Colgan was elected to the Virginia State Senate with 61% of the vote, representing Prince William County, and the cities of Manassas and Manassas Park.

As a result of his seniority, from 2005 to 2011 Prince William County, Manassas, and Manassas Park received more transportation funds than any other jurisdiction in the commonwealth.

As a moderate Democrat, Colgan was well known for working on both sides of the aisle. His bipartisan leadership was well known and respected throughout the Commonwealth of Virginia; one of his greatest friends was Harry J. Parrish, a Republican delegate from Manassas. As a devout Catholic, he advocated bans on legal abortion care and voted with Republicans on abortion-related issues.

On January 11, 2012, after being sworn in for the 10th consecutive term of the Virginia State Senate, Senator Colgan became the longest-serving senator in Virginia history until State Senator Richard Lawrence Saslaw surpassed him in 2024. He was also the last remaining World War II veteran to serve in the chamber.

Colgan faced a number of close elections in the 1990s and early 2000s as his district trended Republican at the national level. However, it became somewhat more secure with Northern Virginia's overall Democratic trend in the mid-2000s.

In June 2014, Colgan announced that he would retire rather than seek re-election. He left office at the age of 89, and was succeeded by fellow Democrat Jeremy McPike.

== Personal life ==
Charles and his wife Agnes (deceased 2001) had eight children, twenty-four grandchildren, and multiple great-grandchildren.

Colgan died in hospice care, in Aldie, Virginia, on January 3, 2017, from a vascular ailment. He was 90.

== Political accomplishments ==
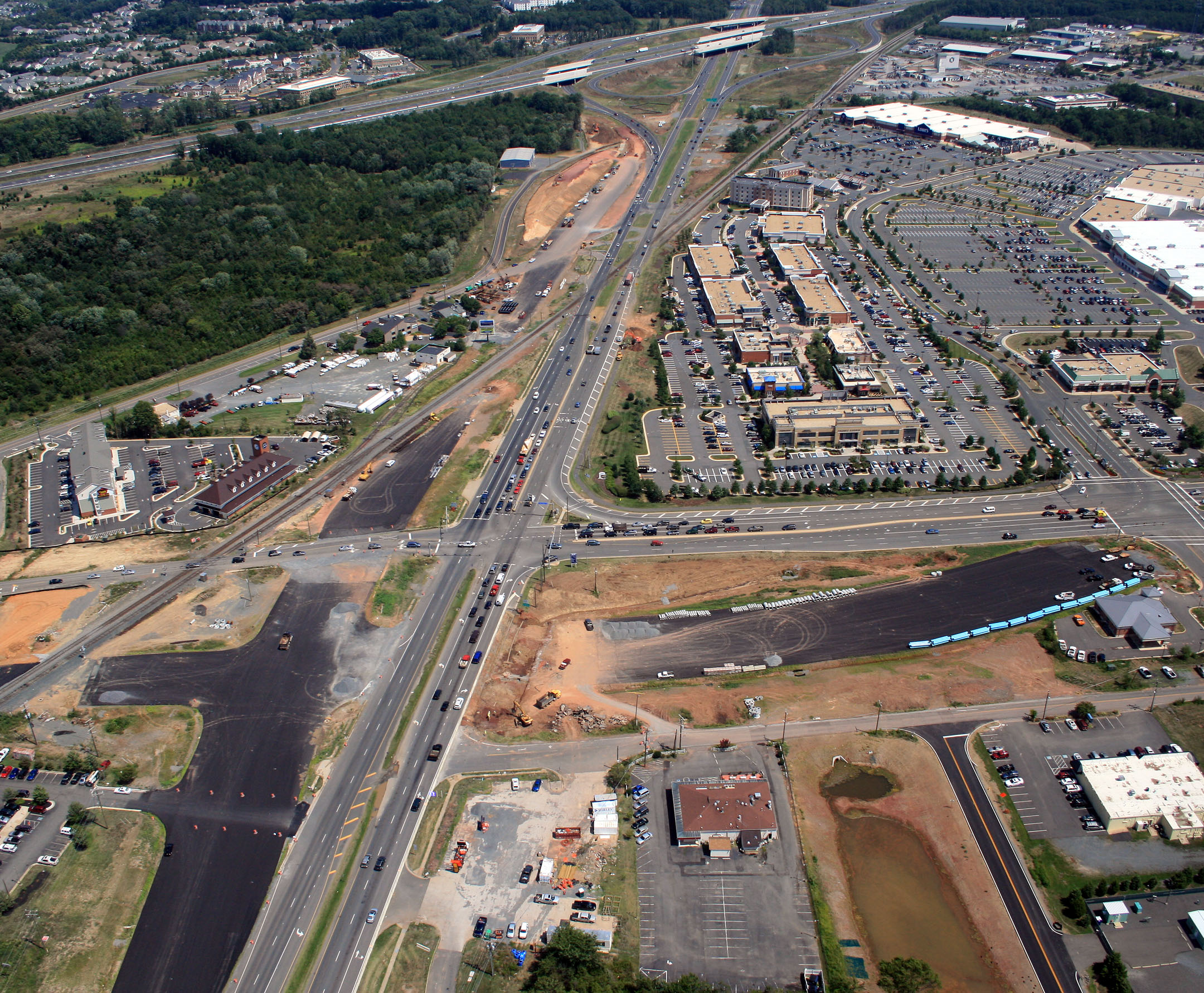
The Gainesville Interchange (2011) in Progress, 435 million plus in state funds

General:

- Patron SB1316 Charter for the City of Manassas Park, 1975.

Transportation:

- VA 234 bypass, bypassing the city of Manassas and extending to the town Dumfries.
- Widening Interstate 66 to four lanes from Manassas to Gainesville.
- Gainesville interchange VA 29/I-66, $435 million.
- Widening Interstate 95 to four lanes.
- Additional rail cars for VRE.

Education:

- In 2011 during statewide cuts, Colgan prevented cuts to K-12 education spending by $730 million.
- Several buildings on Manassas and Woodbridge NVCC campuses.
- Worked to Establish the George Mason Prince William Campus.
- Hylton Center for Performing Arts at GMU Prince William Campus.
- Passed legislation to create the GMU/NIH Research Facility at George Mason University.

Veterans:

- Introduced legislation that provided a free college education to children and spouses of police officers, firefighters and members of the National Guard who are killed in the line of duty.
- Worked to allow local governments to exempt disabled veterans from having to pay property taxes.
