= Ian Lovejoy =

American politician from Virginia

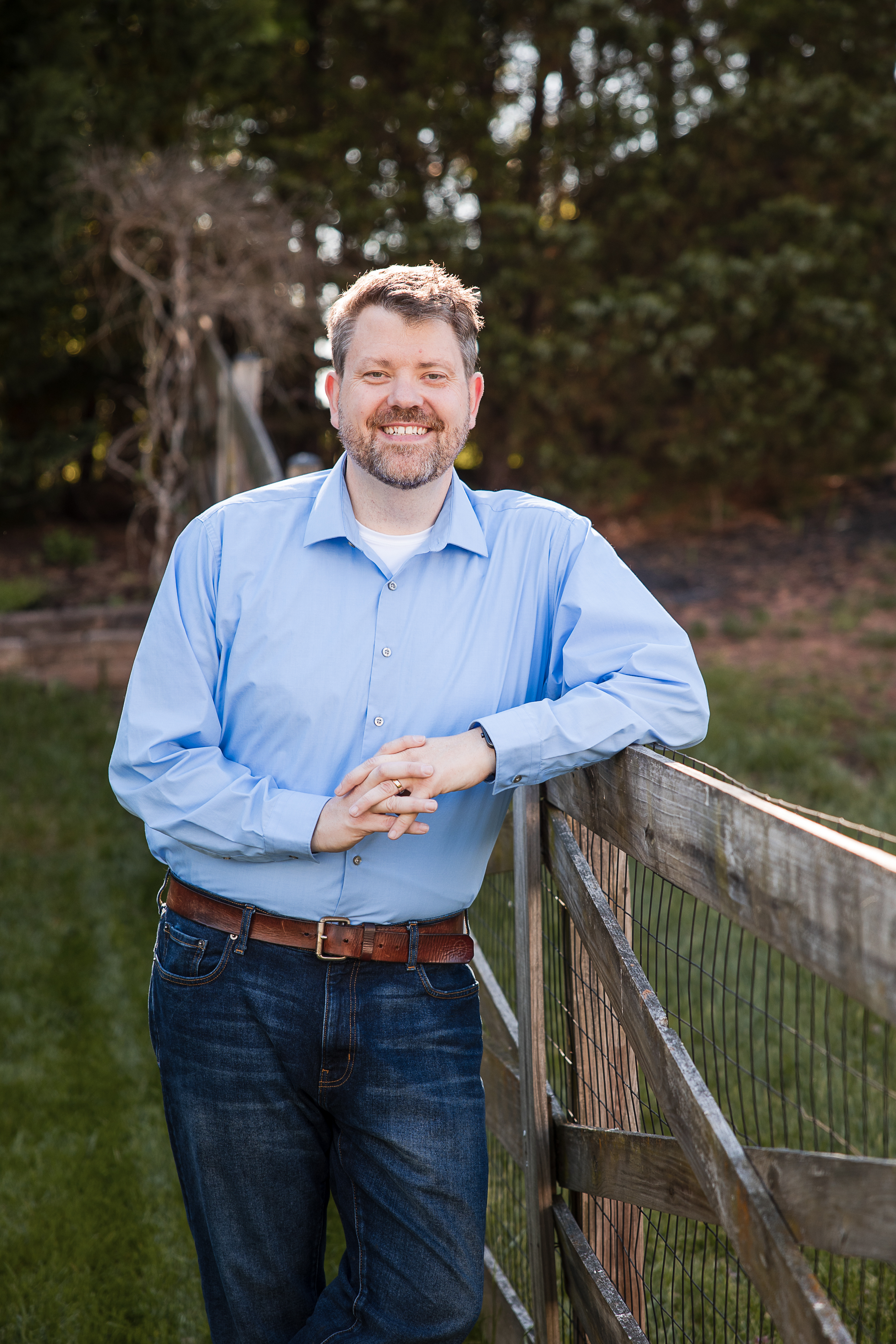

Member of the Virginia House of Delegates from the 22nd district
- In office January 10, 2024 – January 14, 2026
- Preceded by: Kathy Byron (redistricting)
- Succeeded by: Elizabeth Guzmán

Personal details
- Born: Ian Travis Lovejoy; January 3, 1982 (age 44) Charleston, West Virginia
- Party: Republican
- Education: Virginia Tech
- Occupation: Founder and Owner of Reliant Hiring Solutions

Ian Travis Lovejoy (born January 3, 1982) is an American politician, business owner, and educator who served as a member of the Virginia House of Delegates for the 22nd district from 2024 to 2026. A member of the Republican Party, he was elected in the 2023 Virginia House of Delegates election and previously served as a member of the Manassas City Council from 2012 to 2020.

In the 2025 Virginia House of Delegates election, he was unseated by Democrat Elizabeth Guzmán.
