= Kathy Byron =

American politician (born 1953)

Member of the Virginia House of Delegates from the 22nd district
- In office January 14, 1998 – September 30, 2023
- Preceded by: Joyce Crouch
- Succeeded by: Ian Lovejoy (redistricting)

Personal details
- Born: September 5, 1953 (age 73) Abington Township, Montgomery County, Pennsylvania, U.S.
- Party: Republican
- Spouse: John T. Byron
- Children: 3
- Committees: Commerce and Energy (Chairman); Communications, Technology and Innovation; Finance; Rules
- Website: www.kathybyron.com

Kathy J. Byron (born September 5, 1953) is an American politician. She was elected to the Virginia House of Delegates in 1997 as a Republican, representing the 22nd district in the Virginia Piedmont, consisting of parts of Bedford, Campbell and Franklin Counties and the city of Lynchburg. In September 2023, Byron resigned from the Virginia House after being appointed as Deputy Director for External Affairs at the Virginia Department of Workforce Development and Advancement.

== Virginia House of Delegates ==
In February 2012, Byron sponsored HB462, a bill that would require that Virginia women seeking an abortion would have to undergo a transvaginal ultrasound, without her written consent and even if it is against the wishes of her doctor.

After the controversy caused by passing of this bill by Virginia representatives, Governor Bob McDonnell amended the bill to include language that would require the written consent of the woman seeking an abortion, and would also require only a transabdominal ultrasound. However, Byron urged rejection of the amendment on its grounds that a transvaginal ultrasound is an invasive procedure because, "[i]f we want to talk about invasiveness, there's nothing more invasive than the procedure that she is about to have," she said, referring to her belief that abortions harm viable persons within the womb.

In January 2017, she proposed HB2108, a bill that would prevent municipalities from expanding beyond their current footprint and from building and offering broadband to those within the municipalities.

Byron and her husband received a tax break designated for a person’s primary residence in Florida, she says her husband is a resident but she is not.

== Electoral history ==
Date	Election	Candidate	Party	Votes	%
Virginia House of Delegates, 22nd district
November 4, 1997	General	Kathy J. Byron	Republican	10,232	59.04
November 4, 1997	General	Kaye Sweeney Lipscomb	Democratic	7,082	40.87
November 4, 1997	General	Write Ins		16	0.92
November 4, 1997	General	Joyce Crouch retired; seat stayed Republican			
November 2, 1999	General	K J Byron	Republican	7,880	63.86
November 2, 1999	General	J P Campbell	Democratic	4,440	35.98
November 2, 1999	General	Write Ins		19	0.15
November 6, 2001	General	K J Byron	Republican	11,564	56.32
November 6, 2001	General	W S Miles III		8,968	43.68
November 4, 2003	General	K J Byron	Republican	12,946	99.95
November 4, 2003	General	Write Ins		6	0.05
November 8, 2005	General	K J Byron	Republican	15,343	99.03
November 8, 2005	General	Write Ins		151	0.97
November 6, 2007	General	Kathy J. Byron	Republican	8,783	98.98
November 6, 2007	General	Write Ins		90	1.01
November 3, 2009	General	Kathy J. Byron	Republican	18,107	98.99
November 3, 2009	General	Write Ins		183	1.00
November 8, 2011	General	Kathy J. Byron	Republican	12,922	97.69
November 8, 2011	General	Write Ins		305	2.30
November 5, 2013	General	Kathy J. Byron	Republican	15,025	66.3
November 5, 2013	General	Katie Cyphert	Democratic	7,612	33.6
November 5, 2013	General	Write Ins		38	0.20
November 3, 2015	General	Kathy J. Byron	Republican	9,228	96
November 3, 2015	General	Write Ins		384	4
November 7, 2017	General	Kathy J. Byron	Republican	19,014	96.2
November 7, 2017	General	Write Ins		756	3.8
November 5, 2019	General	Kathy J. Byron	Republican	14,390	69
November 5, 2019	General	Jennifer Kay Woofter	Democratic	6,452	30.9
November 5, 2019	General	Write Ins		25	0.1
June 8, 2021	Republican primary	Kathy J. Byron		3,200	81.2
June 8, 2021	Republican primary	Isaiah J. Knight		739	18.8
November 2, 2021	General	Kathy J. Byron	Republican	23,922	72.65
November 2, 2021	General	Gregory K. Eaton	Democratic	8,415	25.56
November 2, 2021	General	Sarah R. Jerose	Libertarian	537	1.63
November 2, 2021	General	Write Ins		52	0.16
