= Virginia's 29th Senate district =

American legislative district

Virginia's 29th State Senate district
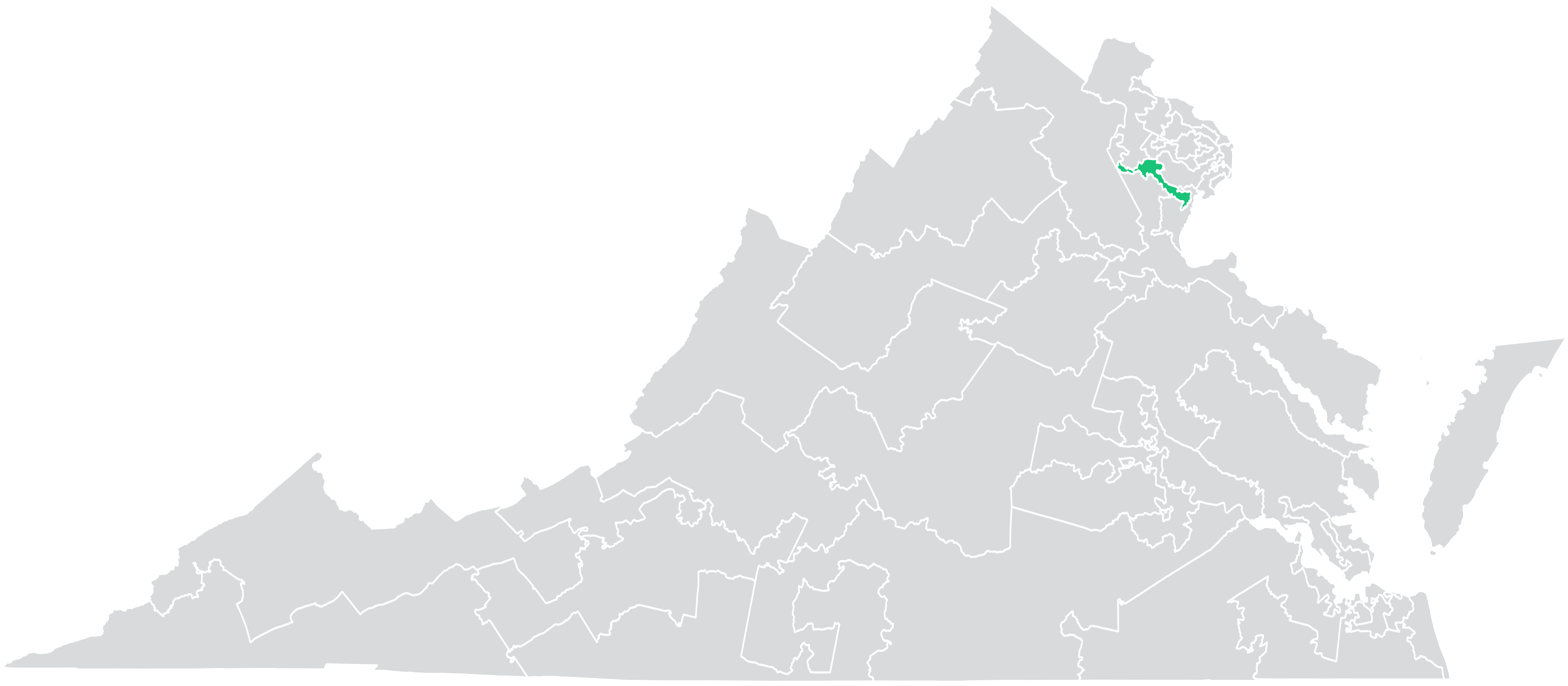
Senator
Jeremy McPike; D–Dale City
- Demographics: 33% White; 21% Black; 33% Hispanic; 9% Asian; 4% Other
- Population (2019): 234,599
- Registered voters: 134,141

Virginia's 29th Senate district is one of 40 districts in the Senate of Virginia. It has been represented by Democrat Jeremy McPike since 2016, succeeding retiring fellow Democrat Charles J. Colgan, the longest serving Senator in Virginia history.

== Geography ==
District 29 covers the cities of Manassas and Manassas Park, as well as much of surrounding Prince William County, including some or all of Dale City, Buckhall, Neabsco, and Potomac Mills.

The district overlaps with Virginia's 7th and 10th congressional districts, and the 20th, 22nd, 23rd, 24th, 25th, and 64th districts of the Virginia House of Delegates.

== Recent election results ==
=== 2019 ===
2019 Virginia Senate election, District 29
Party	Candidate	Votes	%
Democratic	Jeremy McPike (incumbent)	35,148	96.5
Total votes		36,410	100
Democratic hold			

=== 2015 ===
2015 Virginia Senate election, District 29
Primary election
Party	Candidate	Votes	%
Democratic	Jeremy McPike	1,377	43.2
Democratic	Atif Qarni	1,152	36.1
Democratic	Michael Futrell	660	20.7
Total votes		3,191	100
General election
Democratic	Jeremy McPike	16,489	53.7
Republican	Harry Parrish II	14,131	46.1
Total votes		30,680	100
Democratic hold			

=== 2011 ===
2011 Virginia Senate election, District 29
Party	Candidate	Votes	%
Democratic	Charles J. Colgan (incumbent)	13,365	55.0
Republican	Thomas Gordy	10,875	44.8
Total votes		24,284	100
Democratic hold			

=== Federal and statewide results ===
Year	Office	Results
2020	President	Biden 68.1–30.1%
2017	Governor	Northam 66.5–32.4%
2016	President	Clinton 63.8–31.3%
2014	Senate	Warner 56.2–41.4%
2013	Governor	McAuliffe 57.0–39.0%
2012	President	Obama 63.5–35.2%
2012	Senate	Kaine 63.6–36.4%

== Historical results ==
All election results below took place prior to 2011 redistricting, and thus were under different district lines.

=== 2007 ===
2007 Virginia Senate election, District 29
Party	Candidate	Votes	%
Democratic	Charles J. Colgan (incumbent)	21,010	54.1
Republican	Robert Fitzsimmonds	17,766	45.8
Total votes		38,829	100
Democratic hold			

=== 2003 ===
2003 Virginia Senate election, District 29
Party	Candidate	Votes	%
Democratic	Charles J. Colgan (incumbent)	16,185	54.7
Republican	David Mabie	13,415	45.3
Total votes		29,601	100
Democratic hold			

=== 1999 ===
1999 Virginia Senate election, District 29
Primary election
Party	Candidate	Votes	%
Republican	Robert Fitzsimmonds	2,782	51.6
Republican	G. E. Waters	2,610	48.4
Total votes		5,392	100
General election
Democratic	Charles J. Colgan (incumbent)	16,865	58.2
Republican	Robert Fitzsimmonds	12,087	41.7
Total votes		28,954	100
Democratic hold			

=== 1995 ===
1995 Virginia Senate election, District 29
Party	Candidate	Votes	%
Democratic	Charles J. Colgan (incumbent)	17,216	58.1
Republican	James Long	12,386	41.8
Total votes		29,608	100
Democratic hold			
