= 2001 Virginia's 31st House of Delegates district election =

Virginia's 31st House of Delegates district election, 2001, held 5 November 2001, was a contest between Republican Scott Lingamfelter and Democrat Michele "Mickie" Krause. Prior to the general election, Lingamfelter had defeated Dell P. Ennis and G.E. "Buck" Waters in the Republican primary. Lingamfelter was the only Republican in that primary to sign a no-new-taxes pledge.

== Results ==
=== Republican primary ===
Virginia's 31st House of Delegates district Republican primary, 2001
Party	Candidate	Votes	%	±%
Republican	Scott Lingamfelter	1,581	53.5%	
Republican	Dell P. Ennis	858	29.0%	
Republican	G.E. "Buck" Waters	518	17.5%	
Write-ins				
Turnout		2,957		

=== General election ===
Virginia's 31st House of Delegates district election, 2001
Party	Candidate	Votes	%	±%
Republican	Scott Lingamfelter	8,572	55.8%	
Democratic	Michele "Mickie" Krause	6,783	44.2%	
Write-ins		5		
Turnout		15,360		
Republican hold		Swing		

== See also ==
- Virginia's 31st House of Delegates district
