= Atif Qarni =

American politician (born 1978)

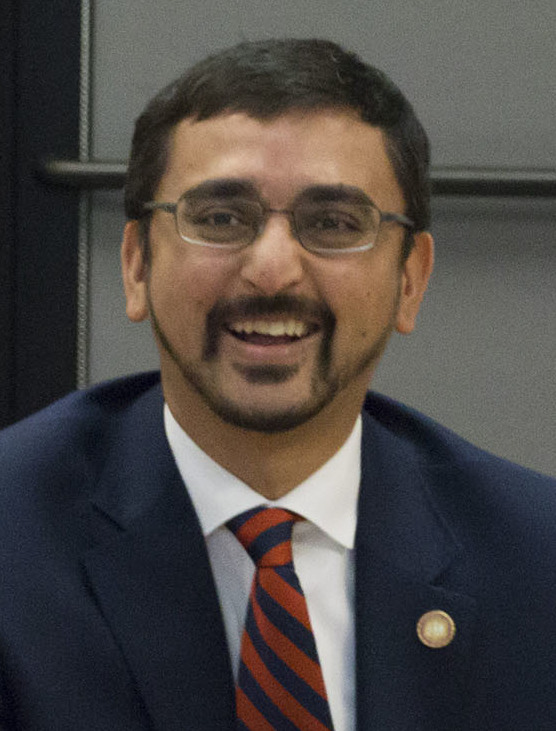

19th Virginia Secretary of Education
- In office January 13, 2018 – November 24, 2021
- Governor: Ralph Northam
- Preceded by: Dietra Trent
- Succeeded by: Fran Bradford

Personal details
- Born: Atif Mustafa Qarni; 1978 (age 47–48) Pakistan
- Party: Democratic
- Spouse: Fatima Pashaei
- Education: George Washington University (BA); George Mason University (MA); Strayer University (MEd); Vanderbilt University (EdD)

Military service
- Allegiance: United States
- Branch/service: U.S. Marine Corps
- Years of service: 1996–2004
- Rank: Sergeant
- Unit: Reserve
- Battles/wars: Iraq War

Atif Mustafa Qarni (born 1978) is an American teacher, former military non-commissioned officer, and Democratic politician who was appointed by Governor Ralph Northam as Virginia Secretary of Education.

== Early life and education ==
Emigrating from Karachi, Pakistan, with his family at the age of ten, Qarni grew up in Parkville, Maryland, before moving to Manassas, Virginia, in 2005. He obtained a bachelor's degree in sociology from George Washington University, a master’s in history and a teaching license in secondary education from George Mason University, a master's in educational administration from Strayer University, and is a doctoral candidate at Vanderbilt University.

== Career ==
He served in the United States Marine Corps, was deployed to Iraq as part of Operation Iraqi Freedom, and rose to the rank of Sergeant. He served as a paralegal at the international law firm McDermott Will & Emery before beginning a career in teaching. He then served as a civics, economics, U.S. history, and math teacher at Beville Middle School in Dale City. Qarni ran for a seat in the Virginia House of Delegates in 2013, losing to incumbent Bob Marshall, and for the Virginia Senate in 2015, losing the Democratic nomination to Jeremy McPike. He was appointed as the Virginia Secretary of Education by governor Ralph Northam in 2017. In 2021, he resigned from the cabinet position to become the managing director of external affairs at Temple University’s Hope Center. In 2024, he ran in the Democratic primary for Virginia's 10th congressional district, placing third.

== Electoral history ==
Date	Election	Candidate	Party	Votes	%
Virginia House of Delegates, 13th district
November 5, 2013	General	Robert G. Marshall	Republican	8,946	51.33
November 5, 2013	General	Atif M. Qarni	Democratic	8,448	48.47
November 5, 2013	General	Write Ins		35	0.20
Virginia Senate, 29th district
June 9, 2015	Primary	Jeremy S. McPike	Democratic	1,377	43.18
June 9, 2015	Primary	Atif M. Qarni	Democratic	1,152	36.12
June 9, 2015	Primary	Michael T. Futrell	Democratic	660	20.70
United States House of Representatives, Virginia's 10th district
June 18, 2024	Primary	Suhas Subramanyam	Democratic	13,504	30.4
June 18, 2024	Primary	Dan Helmer	Democratic	11,784	26.6
June 18, 2024	Primary	Atif Qarni	Democratic	4,768	10.7
June 18, 2024	Primary	Eileen Filler-Corn	Democratic	4,131	9.3
June 18, 2024	Primary	Jennifer Boysko	Democratic	4,016	9.0
June 18, 2024	Primary	David Reid	Democratic	1,419	3.2
June 18, 2024	Primary	Michelle Maldonado	Democratic	1,412	3.2
June 18, 2024	Primary	Adrian Pokharel	Democratic	1,028	2.3
June 18, 2024	Primary	Krystle Kaul	Democratic	982	2.2
June 18, 2024	Primary	Travis Nembhard	Democratic	722	1.6
June 18, 2024	Primary	Marion Devoe	Democratic	386	0.9
June 18, 2024	Primary	Mark Leighton	Democratic	224	0.5
