= Scott Lingamfelter =

American politician (born 1951)

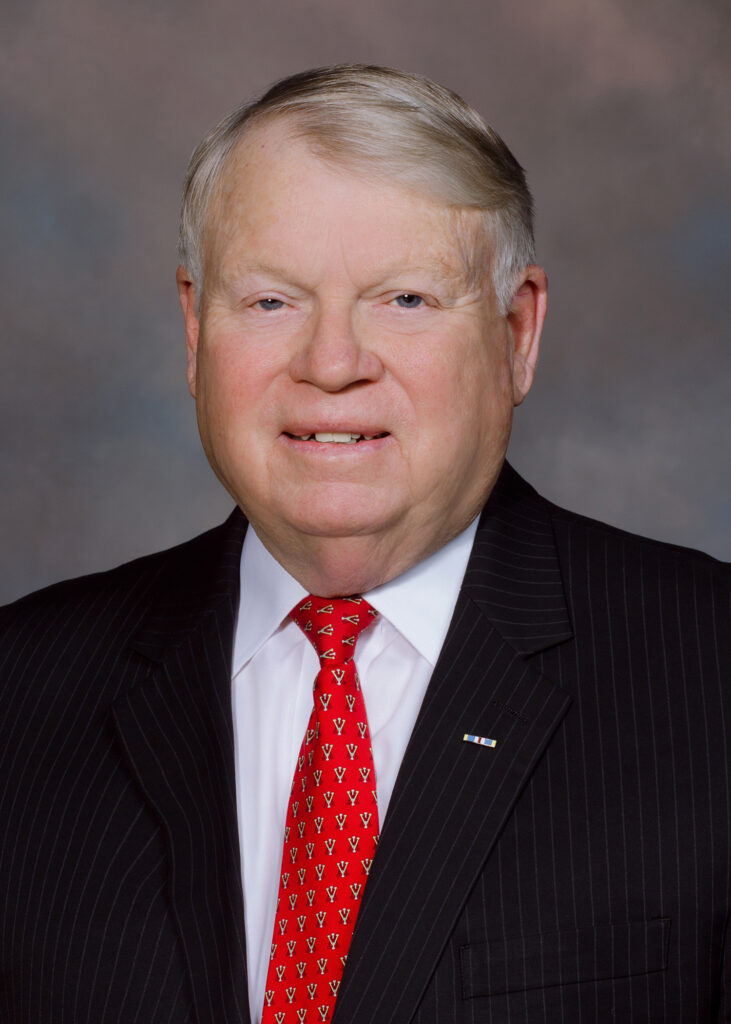

Member of the Virginia House of Delegates from the 31st district
- In office January 9, 2002 – January 10, 2018
- Preceded by: Jay Katzen
- Succeeded by: Elizabeth Guzman

Personal details
- Born: Lee Scott Lingamfelter; March 27, 1951 (age 75) New York, New York, U.S.
- Party: Republican
- Spouse: Shelley Elizabeth Glick
- Education: Virginia Military Institute; University of Virginia
- Website: (LG campaign)

Military service
- Allegiance: United States
- Branch/service: United States Army
- Years of service: 1973–2001
- Rank: Colonel
- Awards: Superior Service Medal; Legion of Merit (2); Bronze Star Medal

Lee Scott Lingamfelter (born March 27, 1951) is an American politician, soldier, and writer who served as a member of the Virginia House of Delegates for the 31st district in Fauquier and Prince William counties from 2002 to 2018. A member of the Republican Party, Lingamfelter ran for re-election in 2017, but lost to Democrat Elizabeth Guzmán. Prior to his election, from 1973 to 2001, Lingamfelter was an officer in the United States Army, reaching the rank of Colonel.

After retiring from politics, Lingamfelter began writing about his military endeavors. In 2020, Lingamfelter published his first book, Desert Redleg: Artillery Warfare in the First Gulf War, describing the experience of the First Gulf War through the eyes of a Field Artillery redleg in the 1st Infantry Division Artillery (DIVARTY). He addressed the question of whether the United States "got the job done" in its first sustained Middle Eastern conflict. Lingamfelter authored a second book in 2023 about the U.S. role in UN Middle East peacekeeping.

== Education and military career ==
Lingamfelter was raised in Richmond, Virginia where he attended public and parochial schools. He then attended the Virginia Military Institute (VMI) in Lexington Virginia where he earned a B.A. in history in 1973. After graduating from VMI as a Distinguished Military Graduate (DMG), he was commissioned in the Regular Army of the United States and began a career as a Field Artilleryman.

In 1979, the Army awarded Lingamfelter a scholarship to the University of Virginia (UVA) where he earned a Master of Arts in Government and Foreign Affairs in 1981. He rose to the rank of Colonel. His last military assignment in the Army was as Military Assistant to the Director, Operational Test and Evaluation of the Office of the Secretary of Defense. He is a graduate of the U.S. Army Command and General Staff College (1985), the U.S. Armed Forces Staff College (redesigned the Joint Forces Staff College) (1989), and the U.S. Army War College (1997) where he served as class president. He retired after 28 years of active-duty service.

Among Lingamfelter's awards and decorations are the Defense Superior Service Medal; two Legions of Merit; the Bronze Star Medal; two Defense Meritorious Service Medals; four Meritorious Service Medals; three Joint Service Commendation Medals; the Army Commendation Medal; the National Defense Service Medal with bronze service star; the Southwest Asia Service Medal with three bronze service stars; the Kuwait Liberation Medal (Saudi Arabia); the Kuwait Liberation Medal (Kuwait); and the United Nations Service Medal.

== Political career ==
=== House of Delegates ===
==== Elections ====
In 2001, Lingamfelter successfully won election to the Virginia House of Delegates as a Republican, defeating Democratic candidate M.D. Krause. Lingamfelter was a Republican member of the Virginia House of Delegates from 2002 to 2018, representing the 31st district in Fauquier and Prince William Counties,. Lingamfelter lost his reelection bid on November 7, 2017, following a wave of Democratic victories across Virginia. Most recently, Lingamfelter was a member of Veterans for Youngkin that supported the election of Governor Glenn Youngkin in 2021. He also published two articles in support of Youngkin in the Washington Times.

==== Tenure ====
Lingamfelter was a former Chair of the Militia, Police, and Public Safety Committee. He also served as a Member of the House Appropriations Committee and the Education Committee. Lingamfelter was also the former Chair of the Subcommittee on Public Safety, as well as a Member of the Subcommittee on Compensation and Retirement, the Subcommittee on Elementary and Secondary Education, and the Subcommittee on General Government and Capital Outlay.

Lingamfelter also served on the Chesapeake Bay Commission and was also the co-chairman of the Legislative Sportsmen's Caucus, a bipartisan group of stakeholders that seeks to promote awareness of issues facing Virginia's outdoorsmen and sportsmen.

Awards

In 2000, Lingamfelter was named the Virginia Family Foundation Citizen of the Year. In 2007, he was named the Chesapeake Bay Legislator of the Year. In 2013, the National Rifle Association of America's Civil Rights Defense Fund voted to award Lingamfelter with the Carter-Knight Award for his successful efforts to repeal Virginia's gun rationing (one-gun-per-month) law.

Candidate for Lieutenant Governor

In June 2012 Lingamfelter announced his candidacy for the Republican nomination for Lieutenant Governor in 2013. After losing in the convention, Lingamfelter threw his support behind Pete Snyder.

Election Results

Date	Election	Candidate	Party	Votes	%
Virginia House of Delegates, 31st district
June 2, 2001	Primary	L. Scott Lingamfelter	Republican	1,581	53.5
June 2, 2001	Primary	D.P. Ennis	Republican	858	29.0
June 2, 2001	Primary	G.B.E. Waters	Republican	518	17.5
November 6, 2001	General	L. Scott Lingamfelter	Republican	8,572	55.8
November 6, 2001	General	M.D. Krause	Democratic	6,783	44.2
November 6, 2001	General	Write Ins		5	
November 4, 2003	General	L. Scott Lingamfelter	Republican	6,787	55.0
November 4, 2003	General	D.G. Brickley	Democratic	5,556	45.0
November 4, 2003	General	Write Ins		2	
November 8, 2005	General	L. Scott Lingamfelter	Republican	11,548	100.0
November 8, 2005	General	Write Ins		530	
November 6, 2007	General	L. Scott Lingamfelter	Republican	7,722	55.3
November 6, 2007	General	Bill S. Day, Jr	Democratic	6,210	44.5
November 6, 2007	General	Write Ins		34	
November 3, 2009	General	L. Scott Lingamfelter	Republican	12,704	100.0
November 3, 2009	General	Write Ins		617	
November 8, 2011	General	L. Scott Lingamfelter	Republican	8,435	58.6
November 8, 2011	General	Roy D. Coffey	Democratic	5,930	41.2
November 8, 2011	General	Write Ins		25	
November 5, 2013	General	L. Scott Lingamfelter	Republican	11,508	50.4
November 5, 2013	General	Jeremy S. McPike	Democratic	11,280	49.4
November 5, 2013	General	Write Ins		45	0.20
November 3, 2015	General	L. Scott Lingamfelter	Republican	9,506	53.4
November 3, 2015	General	Sara E. Townsend	Democratic	8,287	46.5
November 3, 2015	General	Write Ins		16	
November 7, 2017	General	Elizabeth R. Guzman	Democratic	15,466	53.99
November 7, 2017	General	L. Scott Lingamfelter	Republican	12,658	44.19
November 7, 2017	General	Nathan D. Larson	Independent	481	1.68
November 7, 2017	General	Write Ins		39	0.14

== Professional experience ==
Since retiring from the military, Lingamfelter has worked for the private sector focused on strategic planning in support of the senior leadership for the U.S. Missile Defense Agency in Washington, D.C. Additionally, he has worked in the emergency management and homeland security arena in support of federal agencies, states and localities. He is the Former President of the Commonwealth Homeland Security Foundation, Abrams Learning and Information Systems Incorporated and a former consultant for Computer Sciences Corporation.

== Personal life ==
Lingamfelter is married to the former Shelley Glick of Bridgewater, Virginia. They have three children and five grandchildren. Lingamfelter attends Christ our Lord Anglican Church in Woodbridge, Virginia. He is also a member of the Association of the United States Army, the Society of the 1st Division, and Veterans of Foreign Wars (VFW). Lingamfelter is also a regular contributor on political and national security commentary to the Washington Times as well as other journals.
