= Delores Riley Oates =

American politician from Virginia

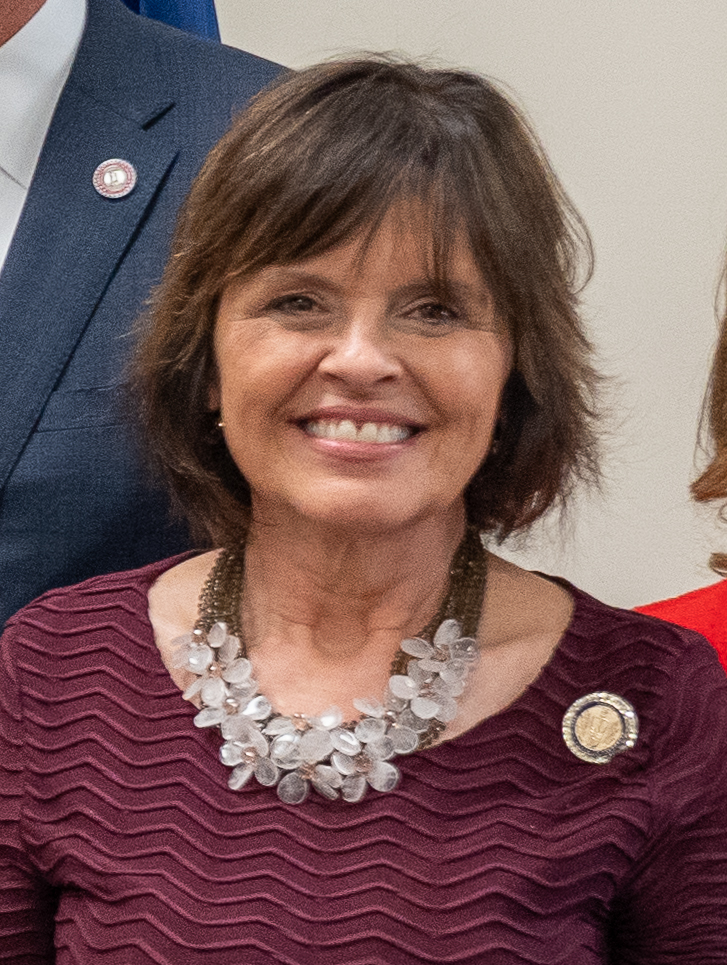

Member of the Virginia House of Delegates from the 31st district
- Incumbent
- Assumed office January 10, 2024
- Preceded by: Wendy Gooditis (redistricting)

Personal details
- Party: Republican

Delores Riley Oates is an American Republican politician from Virginia. She was elected to the Virginia House of Delegates in the 2023 Virginia House of Delegates election from the 31st district.

== Early life and education ==
Oates was born in Front Royal, Virginia. She graduated from Lord Fairfax Community College with an AAS in General Studies in 1986. She graduated from Regent University with a B.A. in Government in 2017.

== Career ==
Oates served on the Warren County Board of Supervisors from 2019 to 2023. On May 5, 2023, she won the Republican party primary for the Virginia House of Delegates' 31st district. She was elected to the House in the 2023 Virginia House of Delegates election held on November 7, 2023.

In January 2025, she filed a bill to ban transgender students from participating in school sports.
