= Jeremy McPike =

American politician

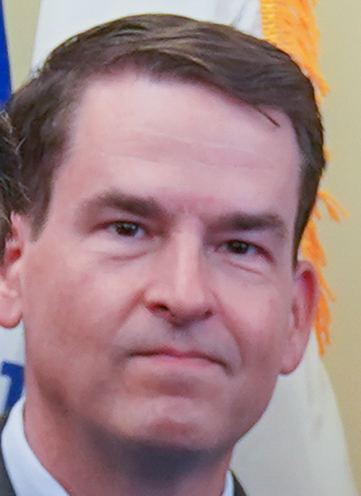

Member of the Virginia Senate from the 29th district
- Incumbent
- Assumed office January 13, 2016
- Preceded by: Charles Colgan

Personal details
- Born: Jeremy Scott McPike; September 19, 1975 (age 51) Washington, D.C., U.S.
- Party: Democratic
- Spouse: Sharon McPike
- Children: 3
- Education: George Mason University (BA, MPA)
- Website: Campaign website

Jeremy Scott McPike (born September 19, 1975) is an American politician representing Virginia's 29th Senate district, which includes portions of Prince William County and Stafford County. A member of the Democratic Party, he was first elected to the Virginia Senate in 2015, replacing retiring Democrat Charles J. Colgan, who had represented the district since 1976.

== Personal life ==
Jeremy McPike has spent his life in Prince William County, attending Elizabeth Vaughan Elementary, Fred Lynn Middle and graduating from Gar-Field High School.

McPike attended George Mason University for his Bachelor's and Master's of Public Administration degrees. He supported himself by working as a construction laborer and superintendent.

McPike has worked for the City of Alexandria for 22 years, and serves as the Director of General Services. He also serves as a volunteer firefighter and EMT with the Dale City Volunteer Fire Department at the rank of captain.

McPike and his wife Sharon live in Dale City with their children.

== Political career ==
In 2013, McPike ran as the Democratic nominee for Virginia's 31st House of Delegates district. Though he was endorsed by The Washington Post, he lost to the Republican incumbent, L. Scott Lingamfelter, by a few hundred votes.

In 2015, McPike was elected to represent Virginia's 29th Senate district, replacing retiring Democrat Charles J. Colgan, who had represented the district since 1976 and was, at the time, the longest serving member of the Virginia Senate in history; Colgan's record was later surpassed by Dick Saslaw.

Virginia's 29th Senate district at the time of McPike's election included the cities of Manassas and Manassas Park, as well as part of Prince William County. It was described by The Washington Post at the time as "one of the most diverse districts in the state" and among the most politically competitive.

In the Democratic primary for the 2015 election, McPike defeated Virginia Delegate Michael Futrell and Atif Qarni, a middle school math teacher and Marine veteran who would later go on to serve as Virginia Secretary of Education in the gubernatorial administration of Ralph Northam.

Everytown for Gun Safety spent $1.5 million in advertising for McPike's 2015 general election campaign, exceeding the total amount of donations McPike had raised for his own campaign expenditures. McPike expressed stronger support for gun control during the campaign than he had done during his failed 2013 House of Delegates campaign, which was in a more conservative district.

== Electoral history ==
Date	Election	Candidate	Party	Votes	%
Virginia House of Delegates, 31st district
November 5, 2013	General	L. Scott Lingamfelter	Republican	11,508	50.40
November 5, 2013	General	Jeremy S. McPike	Democratic	11,280	49.40
November 5, 2013	General	Write Ins		45	0.20
Virginia Senate, 29th district
June 9, 2015	Primary	Jeremy S. McPike	Democratic	1,377	43.18
June 9, 2015	Primary	Atif M. Qarni	Democratic	1,152	36.12
June 9, 2015	Primary	Michael T. Futrell	Democratic	660	20.70
November 3, 2015	General	Jeremy S. McPike	Democratic	16,489	53.76
November 3, 2015	General	Harry J. Parrish II	Republican	14,131	46.07
November 3, 2015	General	Write Ins		54	0.18
November 3, 2015	General	Charles Colgan did not seek reelection; seat stayed Democratic			
November 5, 2019	General	Jeremy S. McPike	Democratic	35,125	91.10
November 5, 2019	General	Write Ins		3,433	8.90

Senate of Virginia
Preceded by Charles Colgan	Member of the Virginia Senate from the 29th district 2016–Present	Incumbent
