= Joseph Crouch =

American politician from Virginia

Member of the Virginia House of Delegates
- In office 1982–1989
- Preceded by: district created
- Succeeded by: Joyce Crouch
- Constituency: District 22

Personal details
- Born: 1933 or 1934
- Died: April 8, 1989 (aged 55)
- Party: Virginia Republican Party
- Spouse: Joyce Crouch

Joseph P. Crouch (1933 or 1934 — April 8, 1989) was an American politician from the Virginia Republican Party. He represented the 22nd district in the Virginia House of Delegates from 1982 to 1989. He died in office at the age of 55 and was succeeded by his wife Joyce Crouch.
