= Joyce Crouch =

American politician from Virginia

Member of the Virginia House of Delegates
- In office 1990–1998
- Preceded by: Joseph Crouch
- Succeeded by: Kathy Byron
- Constituency: District 22

Personal details
- Born: January 16, 1935 Lynchburg, Virginia
- Died: October 25, 2018 (aged 83)
- Party: Virginia Republican Party
- Spouse: Joseph Crouch

Joyce Anne Knowles Crouch (January 16, 1935 – October 25, 2018) was an American politician from the Virginia Republican Party. She was born in Lynchburg, Virginia, and represented the 22nd district in the Virginia House of Delegates from 1990 to 1998.

She succeeded her husband Joseph Crouch who died in office. She died in Virginia.
