= Virginia's 22nd House of Delegates district =

Virginia legislative district

Virginia's 22nd State House of Delegates district
- District map from the 2023 election
Delegate
| Elizabeth Guzman; D–Prince William County |
- Demographics: 59% White; 11% Black; 16% Hispanic; 9% Asian; 0% Native American; 0% Hawaiian/Pacific Islander; 1% Other; 5% Multiracial
- Population (2024) • Voting age: 86,864; 18
- Registered voters: 63,936

Virginia's 22nd House of Delegates district elects one of 100 seats in the Virginia House of Delegates, the lower house of the state's bicameral legislature. The district covers parts of Prince William County, and is currently represented by Democrat Elizabeth Guzman.

== Geography ==
Until redistricting in 2023, District 22, consisted of Bedford County, Lynchburg, Campbell County, and Franklin County. After 2023, the district was based in Prince William County in Northern Virginia, covering the areas of Linton Hall, Nokesville, Orlando, Canova, Cornwell and Buckhall.

== District officeholders ==
| Years | Delegate | Party | Electoral history |
|---|---|---|---|
| January 1982 – April 8, 1989 | Joseph P. Crouch | Republican | Died while in office |
| January 1990 – January 14, 1998 | Joyce K. Crouch | Republican | Retired; Elected following the death of her husband |
| January 14, 1998 – September 2023 | Kathy Byron | Republican | Resigned in September 2023 to assume a position at the Virginia Department of Workforce Development and Advancement |
| January 10, 2024 – January 14, 2026 | Ian Lovejoy | Republican | Elected in the 2023 Virginia House of Delegates election |
| January 14, 2026 – present | Elizabeth Guzmán | Democratic | Elected in the 2025 Virginia House of Delegates election |

== Electoral history ==
| Date | Election | Candidate | Party | Votes | % |
Virginia House of Delegates, 22nd district
| Nov 4, 1997 | General | Kathy J. Byron | Republican | 10,232 | 59.04 |
| Nov 4, 1997 | General | Kaye Sweeney Lipscomb | Democratic | 7,082 | 40.87 |
| Nov 4, 1997 | General | Write Ins | | 16 | 0.92 |
| Nov 4, 1997 | General | Joyce Crouch retired; seat stayed Republican | | | |
| Nov 2, 1999 | General | K J Byron | Republican | 7,880 | 63.86 |
| Nov 2, 1999 | General | J P Campbell | Democratic | 4,440 | 35.98 |
| Nov 2, 1999 | General | Write Ins | | 19 | 0.15 |
| Nov 6, 2001 | General | K J Byron | Republican | 11,564 | 56.32 |
| Nov 6, 2001 | General | W S Miles III | | 8,968 | 43.68 |
| Nov 4, 2003 | General | K J Byron | Republican | 12,946 | 99.95 |
| Nov 4, 2003 | General | Write Ins | | 6 | 0.05 |
| Nov 8, 2005 | General | K J Byron | Republican | 15,343 | 99.03 |
| Nov 8, 2005 | General | Write Ins | | 151 | 0.97 |
| Nov 6, 2007 | General | Kathy J. Byron | Republican | 8,783 | 98.98 |
| Nov 6, 2007 | General | Write Ins | | 90 | 1.01 |
| Nov 3, 2009 | General | Kathy J. Byron | Republican | 18,107 | 98.99 |
| Nov 3, 2009 | General | Write Ins | | 183 | 1.00 |
| Nov 8, 2011 | General | Kathy J. Byron | Republican | 12,922 | 97.69 |
| Nov 8, 2011 | General | Write Ins | | 305 | 2.30 |
| Nov 5, 2013 | General | Kathy J. Byron | Republican | 15,025 | 66.3 |
| Nov 5, 2013 | General | Katie Cyphert | Democratic | 7,612 | 33.6 |
| Nov 5, 2013 | General | Write Ins | | 38 | 0.20 |
| Nov 3, 2015 | General | Kathy J. Byron | Republican | 9,228 | 96.0 |
| Nov 3, 2015 | General | Write Ins | | 384 | 4.0 |
| Nov 7, 2017 | General | Kathy J. Byron | Republican | 19,014 | 96.2 |
| Nov 7, 2017 | General | Write Ins | | 756 | 3.8 |
| Nov 5, 2019 | General | Kathy J. Byron | Republican | 14,390 | 69.0 |
| Nov 5, 2019 | General | Jennifer Kay Woofter | Democratic | 6,452 | 30.9 |
| Nov 5, 2019 | General | Write Ins | | 25 | 0.1 |
| Nov 2, 2021 | General | Kathy J. Byron | Republican | 23,922 | 72.7 |
| Nov 2, 2021 | General | Gregory Kent Eaton | Democratic | 8,415 | 25.6 |
| Nov 2, 2021 | General | Sarah Rachel Jerose | Libertarian | 537 | 1.6 |
| Nov 2, 2021 | General | Write Ins | | 52 | 0.2 |
| Nov 7, 2023 | General | Ian Travis Lovejoy | Republican | 16,032 | 52.2 |
| Nov 7, 2023 | General | Travis S. Nembhard | Democratic | 14,616 | 47.6 |
| Nov 7, 2023 | General | Write Ins | | 70 | 0.2 |
