= Virginia's 31st House of Delegates district =

Virginia's State House of Delegates district
- District map from the 2023 election
Delegate
Dolores Riley Oates; R–Warren County
- Demographics: 78% White; 5% Black; 10% Hispanic; 2% Asian; 0% Native American; 0% Hawaiian/Pacific Islander; 1% Other; 4% Multiracial
- Population (2024) • Voting age: 90,693; 18
- Registered voters: 70,712

Virginia's 31st House of Delegates district elects one of 100 seats in the Virginia House of Delegates, the lower house of the state's bicameral legislature. District 31 contains all of Clarke County and portions of Frederick County and Warren County. Since 2024, Dolores Riley Oates has represented the district.

== District officeholders ==
Years	Delegate	Party	Electoral history
January 12, 1983 – January 8, 1992	Andy Guest	Republican	Redistricted
January 8, 1992 – January 12, 1994	Jerry Wood	Democratic	Lost reelection
January 12, 1994 – January 9, 2002	Jay K. Katzen	Republican	Declined to seek reelection; Unsuccessfully ran for Lieutenant Governor of Virginia
January 9, 2002 – January 10, 2018	Scott Lingamfelter	Republican	Defeated in bid for reelection
January 10, 2018 – January 10, 2024	Elizabeth Guzmán	Democratic	Declined to seek reelection; Unsuccessfully ran for the Democratic nomination for Virginia's 29th Senate District
January 10, 2024 – present	Delores Riley Oates	Republican	First elected in 2023

== See also ==
- Virginia's 31st House of Delegates district election, 2001
- 2011 Virginia's 31st House of Delegates district election
