= 2017 Virginia House of Delegates election =

- November 7, 2017

All 100 seats in the Virginia House of Delegates 51 seats needed for a majority
- Turnout: 47.6% ▲18.5
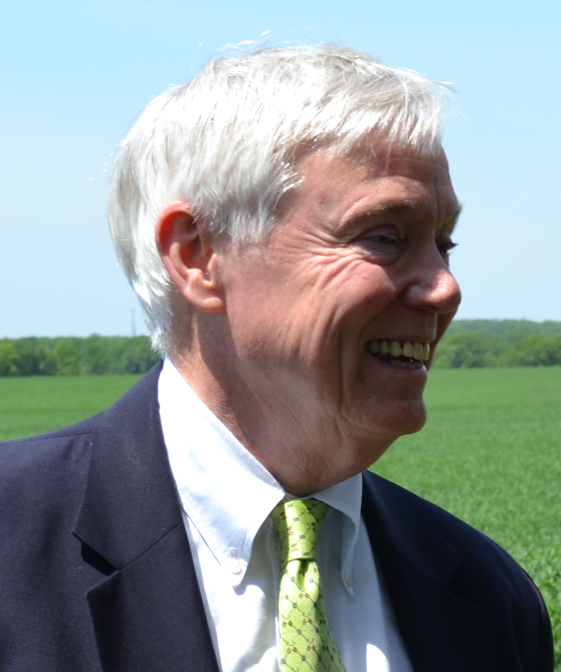

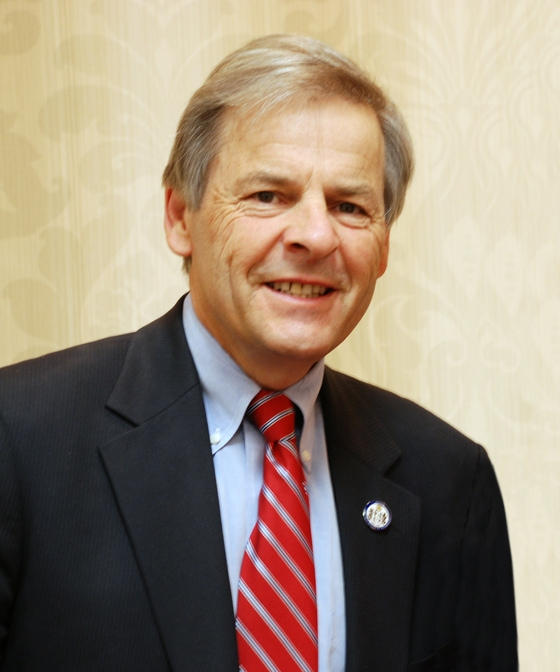
	Majority party	Minority party
Leader	Bill Howell (retired)	David Toscano
Party	Republican	Democratic
Leader since	January 8, 2003	November 19, 2011
Leader's seat	28th	57th
Seats before	66	34
Seats won	51	49
Seat change	▼15	▲15
Popular vote	1,076,081	1,304,241
Percentage	43.8%	53.1%
Swing	▼15.8%	▲17.4%
- Results: Democratic hold Democratic gain Republican hold
Speaker before election
Bill Howell
Republican
Elected Speaker
Kirk Cox
Republican

The 2017 Virginia House of Delegates election was held on Tuesday, November 7. All 100 seats in the Virginia House of Delegates were contested. The Republican Party held a 66–34 majority in the House of Delegates before the election but lost 15 seats to the Democratic Party, resulting in the Republicans holding a 50–49 advantage.

The election was notable for having a perfectly tied vote in the 94th district, which left control of the legislature undecided. The winner of the race was determined by a random drawing on January 4, 2018, which resulted in the Republicans holding a 51–49 majority.

== Background ==
The election took place during the first term of President Donald Trump, a Republican who won the 2016 presidential election. Democrats fielded a larger number of candidates than usual in hopes of defying Trump. While there were 17 Republican delegates in districts that had voted Clinton, there were no Democrats from districts that had backed Trump. For this reason, Democrats focused more on picking up seats than on defending seats. Early on, it was expected that Republicans would hold the majority, but Democrats became more optimistic following the unexpectedly close result in Kansas's 4th congressional district special election. Likewise, after Jacqueline Smith won the election for Prince William County Clerk of Circuit Court, Republicans expressed concern that Democratic momentum and Republican internal bickering could cause them to lose five to ten seats in the House of Delegates. Democratic state senator Jeremy McPike argued that Smith's victory boded well for Democratic turnout in the state election.

The filing deadline for Republicans and Democrats to participate in the June 13 primary was March 30. There were seven open House seats, as Republicans Dave Albo, Mark Dudenhefer, Peter Farrell, Bill Howell, Jimmie Massie, and Rick Morris, and Democrat Daun Hester all declined to run again. A total of 55 House of Delegates races were contested. 77 Democrats lined up to challenge 49 Republican incumbents. 35 races were uncontested in the general election, with 13 having only a Republican candidate and 22 having only a Democrat.

In the 2017 election, Democrats reported 153,442 donations of $100 or less, whereas Republicans reported 7,332 such donations.

== Delegates not running for re-election ==
Delegate	Seat	First elected	Party	Date announced	Ref.
Dave Albo	42nd district	1993	Republican	April 5, 2017	
Mark Dudenhefer	2nd district	2015	Republican	January 6, 2017	
Peter Farrell	56th district	2013	Republican	March 10, 2017	
Daun Hester	89th district	2012	Democratic	December 30, 2016	
William J. Howell	28th district	1987	Republican	February 20, 2017	
Jimmie Massie	72nd district	2007	Republican	March 18, 2017	
Rick Morris	64th district	2011	Republican	March 1, 2017	

== Results ==
By November 8, the Associated Press called the elections in 96 districts, giving the Democrats a 49–47 advantage but not yet the majority of seats. Upon certification of the election results on November 27, the Republicans held a 51–49 majority. A recount in the 94th district resulted in the Democrats gaining one more seat, causing a 50–50 split. But a three-judge panel declined to certify the result and counted another vote that tied the election, which led to the panel declaring that there was no winner. So the balance of the House of Delegates was at 50–49 in the Republicans' favor until the race was resolved through drawing lots, as per state law. On January 4, 2018, the drawing was held and Republican David Yancey was declared the winner. His opponent, Shelly Simonds, conceded on January 10.

There were several notable candidates who won elections. Democratic candidate Chris Hurst, whose girlfriend was murdered on live television in 2015, defeated Republican incumbent and National Rifle Association-supported Joseph Yost in the 12th district. In the 13th district, Democratic candidate Danica Roem defeated Republican incumbent Bob Marshall to become the first openly transgender candidate to be elected and serve in a state legislative body in the United States. In the 21st and 42nd districts, respectively, Democratic candidates Kelly Fowler and Kathy Tran became the first Asian American women elected to the House of Delegates after defeating Republican incumbent Ron Villanueva and candidate Lolita Mancheno-Smoak. Democratic candidates Elizabeth Guzmán and Hala Ayala defeated Republican incumbents Scott Lingamfelter and Richard Anderson in the 31st and 51st districts, respectively, to also become the first two Hispanic women elected to the House of Delegates. In the 50th district, Lee Carter, the Democratic candidate and a self-described democratic socialist, defeated Republican incumbent and House Majority Whip Jackson Miller. Democratic candidate Dawn M. Adams became the first openly lesbian candidate to be elected to the House of Delegates after defeating Republican incumbent G. Manoli Loupassi in the 68th district.

In the 2017 election, 25 women were elected to the House of Delegates, breaking the previous record of 19 that was set in 2013.

=== Close races ===
Seats where the margin of victory was under 10%:

1. HD District 94 Tie
2. HD District 40, 0.4%
3. HD District 28, 0.4%
4. HD District 27, 0.5%
5. HD District 68 0.9% (gain)
6. HD District 85 1.6% (gain)
7. HD District 73, 3.1% (gain)
8. HD District 62, 3.5%
9. HD District 84, 3.6%
10. HD District 10, 3.9% (gain)
11. HD District 100 4.4%
12. HD District 21, 5.2% (gain)
13. HD District 72, 5.6% (gain)
14. HD District 51, 6.2% (gain)
15. HD District 13, 7.8% (gain)
16. HD District 50, 8.8% (gain)
17. HD District 12, 8.9% (gain)
18. HD District 26, 9.2%
19. HD District 33, 9.7%
20. HD District 31, 9.8% (gain)

=== Overall ===
Republican (51) Democratic (49)

Party	Leader	Delegates				Votes		
Party	Leader		Of total		±		Of total	±
Republican Party	William J. Howell	51	51.00%	51 / 100	▼15	1,076,081	43.81%	▼15.79
Democratic Party	David Toscano	49	49.00%	49 / 100	▲15	1,304,241	53.10%	▲17.35
Other parties
Write-in	N/A	0	0.00%	0 / 100	Steady	36,640	1.49%	
Independent	N/A	0	0.00%	0 / 100	Steady	26,603	1.08%	
Green Party	N/A	0	0.00%	0 / 100	Steady	6,409	0.26%	▲0.08
Libertarian Party	N/A	0	0%	0 / 100	Steady	6,295	0.25%	▼0.13

=== By House of Delegates district ===
District	Incumbent			This race	
Number	Representative	Party	First elected	Winner	Candidates
1	Terry Kilgore	Republican	1993	Terry Kilgore (R)	Terry Kilgore (R) 76.0% Alicia Kallen (D) 23.8%
2	Mark Dudenhefer	Republican	2015 (2012–2014)	Jennifer Carroll Foy (D); Democratic gain.	Jennifer Carroll Foy (D) 63.0% Mike Makee (R) 36.8%
3	Will Morefield	Republican	2009	Will Morefield (R)	Will Morefield (R) 78.1% Bill Bunch (D) 21.6%
4	Todd Pillion	Republican	2014	Todd Pillion (R)	Todd Pillion (R) unopposed
5	Israel O'Quinn	Republican	2011	Israel O'Quinn (R)	Israel O'Quinn (R) unopposed
6	Jeff Campbell	Republican	2013	Jeff Campbell (R)	Jeff Campbell (R) 81.3% Kenneth Browning (I) 17.9%
7	Nick Rush	Republican	2011	Nick Rush (R)	Nick Rush (R) 66.3% Flourette Ketner (D) 33.5%
8	Greg Habeeb	Republican	2011	Greg Habeeb (R)	Greg Habeeb (R) 63.9% Steve McBride (D) 35.9%
9	Charles Poindexter	Republican	2007	Charles Poindexter (R)	Charles Poindexter (R) 70.3% Stephanie Cook (D) 29.6%
10	Randy Minchew	Republican	2011	Wendy Gooditis (D); Democratic gain.	Wendy Gooditis (D) 51.9% Randy Minchew (R) 48.0%
11	Sam Rasoul	Democratic	2014	Sam Rasoul (D)	Sam Rasoul (D) unopposed
12	Joseph R. Yost	Republican	2011	Chris Hurst (D); Democratic gain.	Chris Hurst (D) 54.4% Joseph R. Yost (R) 45.5%
13	Bob Marshall	Republican	1991	Danica Roem (D); Democratic gain.	Danica Roem (D) 53.7% Bob Marshall (R) 45.9%
14	Danny Marshall	Republican	2001	Danny Marshall (R)	Danny Marshall (R) unopposed
15	Todd Gilbert	Republican	2005	Todd Gilbert (R)	Todd Gilbert (R) unopposed
16	Les Adams	Republican	2013	Les Adams (R)	Les Adams (R) unopposed
17	Chris Head	Republican	2011	Chris Head (R)	Chris Head (R) 60.6% Djuna Osborne (D) 39.3%
18	Michael Webert	Republican	2011	Michael Webert (R)	Michael Webert (R) 60.4% Tristan Shields (D) 34.3% Will King (G) 5.2%
19	Terry Austin	Republican	2013	Terry Austin (R)	Terry Austin (R) unopposed
20	Richard Bell	Republican	2009	Richard Bell (R)	Richard Bell (R) 54.5% Michele Edwards (D) 42.6% Will Hammer (L) 2.8%
21	Ron Villanueva	Republican	2009	Kelly Fowler (D); Democratic gain.	Kelly Fowler (D) 52.5% Ron Villanueva (R) 47.3%
22	Kathy Byron	Republican	1997	Kathy Byron (R)	Kathy Byron (R) unopposed
23	Scott Garrett	Republican	2009	Scott Garrett (R)	Scott Garrett (R) 65.7% Natalie Short (D) 34.2%
24	Benjamin L. Cline	Republican	2002	Benjamin L. Cline (R)	Benjamin L. Cline (R) 71.9% John C. Winfrey (I) 27.7%
25	Steve Landes	Republican	1995	Steve Landes (R)	Steve Landes (R) 58.0% Angela Lynn (D) 41.9%
26	Tony Wilt	Republican	2010	Tony Wilt (R)	Tony Wilt (R) 54.5% Brent Finnegan (D) 45.3%
27	Roxann Robinson	Republican	2010	Roxann Robinson (R)	Roxann Robinson (R) 50.2% Larry V. Barnett (D) 49.7%
28	Bill Howell	Republican	1987	Bob Thomas (R); Republican hold.	Bob Thomas (R) 50.1% Joshua G. Cole (D) 49.7%
29	Chris Collins	Republican	2015	Chris Collins (R)	Chris Collins (R) 64.2% Casey Turben (D) 35.6%
30	Nicholas Freitas	Republican	2015	Nicholas Freitas (R)	Nicholas Freitas (R) 62.1% Ben Hixon (D) 37.8%
31	Scott Lingamfelter	Republican	2001	Elizabeth Guzman (D); Democratic gain.	Elizabeth Guzman (D) 54.0% Scott Lingamfelter (R) 44.2% Nathan Larson (I) 1.7%
32	Tag Greason	Republican	2009	David Reid (D); Democratic gain.	David Reid (D) 58.5% Tag Greason (R) 41.4%
33	Dave LaRock	Republican	2013	Dave LaRock (R)	Dave LaRock (R) 54.8% Tia Walbridge (D) 45.1%
34	Kathleen Murphy	Democratic	2015	Kathleen Murphy (D)	Kathleen Murphy (D) 60.9% Cheryl A. Buford (R) 39.0%
35	Mark Keam	Democratic	2009	Mark Keam (D)	Mark Keam (D) unopposed
36	Ken Plum	Democratic	1981 (1978–1980)	Ken Plum (D)	Ken Plum (D) unopposed
37	David Bulova	Democratic	2005	David Bulova (D)	David Bulova (D) unopposed
38	Kaye Kory	Democratic	2009	Kaye Kory (D)	Kaye Kory (D) 73.5% Paul Haring (R) 26.3%
39	Vivian Watts	Democratic	1995	Vivian Watts (D)	Vivian Watts (D) unopposed
40	Tim Hugo	Republican	2002	Tim Hugo (R)	Tim Hugo (R) 50.1% Donte Tanner (D) 49.7%
41	Eileen Filler-Corn	Democratic	2010	Eileen Filler-Corn (D)	Eileen Filler-Corn (D) unopposed
42	Dave Albo	Republican	1993	Kathy Tran (D); Democratic gain.	Kathy Tran (D) 61.0% Lolita Mancheno-Smoak (R) 38.9%
43	Mark Sickles	Democratic	2003	Mark Sickles (D)	Mark Sickles (D) unopposed
44	Paul Krizek	Democratic	2015	Paul Krizek (D)	Paul Krizek (D) unopposed
45	Mark Levine	Democratic	2015	Mark Levine (D)	Mark Levine (D) unopposed
46	Charniele Herring	Democratic	2009	Charniele Herring (D)	Charniele Herring (D) unopposed
47	Patrick Hope	Democratic	2009	Patrick Hope (D)	Patrick Hope (D) unopposed
48	Rip Sullivan	Democratic	2014	Rip Sullivan (D)	Rip Sullivan (D) unopposed
49	Alfonso Lopez	Democratic	2011	Alfonso Lopez (D)	Alfonso Lopez (D) 81.3% Adam Roosevelt (R) 18.5%
50	Jackson Miller	Republican	2006	Lee Carter (D); Democratic gain.	Lee Carter (D) 54.3% Jackson Miller (R) 45.5%
51	Rich Anderson	Republican	2009	Hala Ayala (D); Democratic gain.	Hala Ayala (D) 53.0% Rich Anderson (R) 46.8%
52	Luke Torian	Democratic	2009	Luke Torian (D)	Luke Torian (D) unopposed
53	Marcus Simon	Democratic	2013	Marcus Simon (D)	Marcus Simon (D) 74.3% Mike Casey (I) 24.6%
54	Bobby Orrock	Republican	1989	Bobby Orrock (R)	Bobby Orrock (R) 57.9% Al Durante (D) 41.9%
55	Buddy Fowler	Republican	2013	Buddy Fowler (R)	Buddy Fowler (R) 59.9% Morgan Goodman (D) 39.9%
56	Peter Farrell	Republican	2011	John McGuire III (R); Republican hold.	John McGuire III (R) 59.5% Melissa M. Dart (D) 40.4%
57	David Toscano	Democratic	2005	David Toscano (D)	David Toscano (D) unopposed
58	Rob Bell	Republican	2001	Rob Bell (R)	Rob Bell (R) 61.2% Kellen Squire (D) 38.7%
59	Matt Fariss	Republican	2011	Matt Fariss (R)	Matt Fariss (R) 61.2% Tracy Carver (D) 34.1% David Ball (I) 3.4% Marcus T. Sutphin (G) 1.2%
60	James E. Edmunds	Republican	2009	James E. Edmunds (R)	James E. Edmunds (R) 61.9% Jamaal Johnston (D) 38.0%
61	Tommy Wright	Republican	2000	Tommy Wright (R)	Tommy Wright (R) unopposed
62	Riley Ingram	Republican	1991	Riley Ingram (R)	Riley Ingram (R) 51.7% Sheila Bynum-Coleman (D) 48.2%
63	Lashrecse Aird	Democratic	2015	Lashrecse Aird (D)	Lashrecse Aird (D) unopposed
64	Rick Morris	Republican	2011	Emily Brewer (R); Republican hold.	Emily Brewer (R) 62.4% Rebecca S. Colaw (D) 37.5%
65	Lee Ware	Republican	1998	Lee Ware (R)	Lee Ware (R) 64.0% Francis Stevens (D) 35.8%
66	Kirk Cox	Republican	1989	Kirk Cox (R)	Kirk Cox (R) 63.5% Katie Ann Sponsler (D) 36.4%
67	James LeMunyon	Republican	2009	Karrie Delaney (D); Democratic gain.	Karrie Delaney (D) 57.9% James LeMunyon (R) 42.0%
68	Manoli Loupassi	Republican	2007	Dawn M. Adams (D); Democratic gain.	Dawn M. Adams (D) 50.4% Manoli Loupassi (R) 49.5%
69	Betsy B. Carr	Democratic	2009	Betsy B. Carr (D)	Betsy B. Carr (D) 86.6% Jake Crocker (L) 8.5% Montigue Magruder (G) 4.7%
70	Delores McQuinn	Democratic	2008	Delores McQuinn (D)	Delores McQuinn (D) unopposed
71	Jeff Bourne	Democratic	2017	Jeff Bourne (D)	Jeff Bourne (D) unopposed
72	Jimmie Massie	Republican	2007	Schuyler T. VanValkenburg (D); Democratic gain.	Schuyler T. VanValkenburg (D) 52.7% Eddie Whitlock (R) 47.1%
73	John O'Bannon	Republican	2000	Debra H. Rodman (D); Democratic gain.	Debra H. Rodman (D) 51.5% John O'Bannon (R) 48.4%
74	Lamont Bagby	Democratic	2015	Lamont Bagby (D)	Lamont Bagby (D) 76.0% Preston Brown (I) 23.3%
75	Roslyn Tyler	Democratic	2005	Roslyn Tyler (D)	Roslyn Tyler (D) unopposed
76	Chris Jones	Republican	1997	Chris Jones (R)	Chris Jones (R) unopposed
77	Cliff Hayes, Jr.	Democratic	2016	Cliff Hayes, Jr. (D)	Cliff Hayes, Jr. (D) 82.6% Jeff Staples (G) 16.9%
78	Jay Leftwich	Republican	2013	Jay Leftwich (R)	Jay Leftwich (R) unopposed
79	Steve Heretick	Democratic	2015	Steve Heretick (D)	Steve Heretick (D) unopposed
80	Matthew James	Democratic	2009	Matthew James (D)	Matthew James (D) unopposed
81	Barry Knight	Republican	2008	Barry Knight (R)	Barry Knight (R) 59.0% Kimberly Anne Tucker (D) 40.9%
82	Jason Miyares	Republican	2015	Jason Miyares (R)	Jason Miyares (R) 58.9% Leigh Anne Bowling (D) 41.0%
83	Chris Stolle	Republican	2009	Chris Stolle (R)	Chris Stolle (R) 56.6% David Rose-Carmack (D) 43.3%
84	Glenn Davis	Republican	2013	Glenn Davis (R)	Glenn Davis (R) 51.7% Veronica Coleman (D) 48.1%
85	Rocky Holcomb	Republican	2017	Cheryl Turpin (D); Democratic gain.	Cheryl Turpin (D) 50.7% Rocky Holcomb (R) 49.1%
86	Jennifer Boysko	Democratic	2015	Jennifer Boysko (D)	Jennifer Boysko (D) 68.5% Linda C. Schulz (R) 31.3%
87	John Bell	Democratic	2015	John Bell (D)	John Bell (D) 61.7% Subba R. Kolla (R) 38.0%
88	Mark Cole	Republican	2001	Mark Cole (R)	Mark Cole (R) 52.7% Steve Aycock (D) 37.3% Amanda Blalock (I) 8.9% Gerald Anderson (G) 1.0%
89	Daun Hester	Democratic	2012	Jay Jones (D); Democratic hold.	Jay Jones (D) 84.5% Terry Hurst (L) 15.0%
90	Joe Lindsey	Democratic	2014	Joe Lindsey (D)	Joe Lindsey (D) unopposed
91	Gordon Helsel	Republican	2011	Gordon Helsel (R)	Gordon Helsel (R) 56.2% Michael Wade (D) 43.6%
92	Jeion Ward	Democratic	2003	Jeion Ward (D)	Jeion Ward (D) unopposed
93	Michael Mullin	Democratic	2016	Michael Mullin (D)	Michael Mullin (D) 60.0% Heather Cordasco (R) 39.9%
94	David Yancey	Republican	2011	David Yancey (R); Republican hold after tiebreaker.	David Yancey (R) 48.638% Shelly Simonds (D) 48.638% Michael Bartley (L) 2.8%
95	Marcia Price	Democratic	2015	Marcia Price (D)	Marcia Price (D) unopposed
96	Brenda Pogge	Republican	2007	Brenda Pogge (R)	Brenda Pogge (R) 56.9% Kelly DeLucia (D) 42.9%
97	Chris Peace	Republican	2006	Chris Peace (R)	Chris Peace (R) 72.2% Cori Johnson (D) 27.6%
98	Keith Hodges	Republican	2011	Keith Hodges (R)	Keith Hodges (R) 65.1% Sheila Crowley (D) 34.9%
99	Margaret Ransone	Republican	2011	Margaret Ransone (R)	Margaret Ransone (R) 62.2% Francis N. Edwards (D) 37.7%
100	Robert Bloxom Jr.	Republican	2014	Robert Bloxom Jr. (R)	Robert Bloxom Jr. (R) 52.1% Willie Randall (D) 47.7%

=== Seats that changed hands ===
Republican to Democratic (15)

- 2nd district
- 10th district
- 12th district
- 13th district
- 21st district
- 31st district
- 32nd district
- 42nd district
- 50th district
- 51st district
- 67th district
- 68th district
- 72nd district
- 73rd district
- 85th district

== Aftermath ==
=== Reaction ===
Frank Bruni, a columnist for The New York Times, said the Republican Party should be "scared" as a result of the Virginia elections. Slate writer Mark Stern blamed gerrymandering as the reason why the Democrats did not win a majority in the House of Delegates. Chicago Tribune editorial board member Clarence Page called the election an "unmistakable anti-Trump backlash."

=== Misinformation ===
On November 7, a Twitter account called "MAGA Mike King" was suspended after it tweeted more than a dozen times a graphic purportedly instructing Virginians on how to vote by text. On the same day, Harry Wiggins, the chair of the Prince William County Democratic Committee, told The Intercept that voters in his county were receiving robocalls falsely telling them their polling places had changed.

=== Irregularities ===
On November 13, the NAACP Legal Defense and Educational Fund filed a lawsuit in the state court alleging that conflicting and misleading instructions from the Stafford County Electoral Board would ultimately prevent provisional ballots from being counted. Their lawsuit was thrown out on November 14 by judge Victoria Willis because it was not clear that the two voters named as plaintiffs had been harmed. On November 20, the Virginia State Board of Elections voted unanimously to delay certification of elections in the 28th and 88th districts after Elections Commissioner Edgardo Cortés announced that in April 2016, Fredericksburg registrar Juanita Pitchford erroneously assigned 83 voters from the 28th to the 88th.

On November 22, federal judge T. S. Ellis III rejected the Virginia Democratic Party's bid to halt the Virginia State Board of Elections from certifying the vote totals in the 28th district. After certifying the final results on November 27, Virginia State Board of Elections Chairman James Alcorn acknowledged the possibility of other voters being erroneously assigned to the wrong district. On December 7, the Democrats filed an amended complaint that asked the judge to order the state to decertify the election, block Republican candidate Robert Thomas from being seated as a delegate when the General Assembly convenes in January, and hold a new election for the seat.

On January 2, 2018, it was reported that the Virginia Department of Elections, Speaker Bill Howell, and Fredericksburg's Electoral Board knew there were problems with voters assigned to the wrong House districts in the Fredericksburg area since at least early 2015.

=== Recounts ===
On November 29, Democratic candidates Shelly Simonds and Donte Tanner filed for recounts in the 94th and 40th districts, respectively. On November 30, Republican incumbent Manoli Loupassi, who lost to Democratic candidate Dawn Adams, filed for a recount in the 68th district. On December 3, Democratic candidate Joshua Cole filed a request for a recount in the 28th district. On December 14, Republican incumbent Tim Hugo won the recount in the 40th district, defeating Donte Tanner by 99 votes. On December 20, Adams' victory over Loupassi was confirmed by the recount. On December 21, Republican candidate Robert Thomas defeated Joshua Cole in the recount of the 28th district election.

On December 19, the recount in the 94th district determined that Simonds defeated Republican incumbent David Yancey by one vote, which ended the 18-year Republican majority in the House of Delegates and created an even 50–50 split. It was the first time in almost thirty years that a recount changed an election result in Virginia. However, a three-judge panel declined to certify the results, citing a questionable ballot that had previously not been counted, which they deemed should be counted in favor of the Republican instead. Judge Bryant Sugg said, "The court declares there is no winner in this election." In the event of a tie in a House of Delegates election, state law says the winner is chosen by lot. On December 21, James Alcorn tweeted that a random drawing would occur on December 27.

On December 26, the drawing was postponed after Simonds filed a legal motion challenging the validity of a ballot counted in Yancey's favor. On December 28 on CNN's New Day, Simonds said, "I do have a problem with doing a game of chance now, because I do feel now I did win fair and square during the recount." On December 29, Alcorn tweeted, "The State Board of Elections will convene on Thursday, January 4 at 11:00 am. Unless the court system intervenes, the Board will draw a winner for [the 94th district]." In the legal case, Yancey filed paperwork arguing that Simonds had presented no grounds for a recount court to reconsider its decision. On January 3, 2018, the recount panel rejected Simonds' motion, allowing the random draw to proceed as planned. On January 4, the tie-breaking drawing was held and Yancey was the winner. Simonds conceded on January 10.

=== Speakership ===
If the Republicans retained a majority in the House of Delegates, Kirk Cox was in line to become speaker. On December 8, Kenneth R. Plum, a Democrat and the most senior member of the House of Delegates, voiced the possibility of him becoming speaker while minority leader David Toscano is named the majority leader. In an email disclosed by The Washington Post on December 27, Toscano accused the Republicans of trying "to undermine [Democratic] unity by offering deals to various members in exchange [for] a vote for Speaker." Toscano also warned his fellow Democratic delegates against calling in sick when the legislature convenes or taking an ill-timed bathroom break during the floor session, fearing that in an evenly split chamber, the Republicans might seize any opportunity to call a vote and take control. After the Republicans retained a majority in the House of Delegates, Cox was elected speaker by a vote of 98–0 on January 10, 2018. Cox didn't vote for himself, and one Democratic delegate didn't appear to be in the chamber.

== See also ==
- United States elections, 2017
- Virginia elections, 2017
  - Virginia gubernatorial election, 2017
  - Virginia lieutenant gubernatorial election, 2017
  - Virginia Attorney General election, 2017
