= 2007 Virginia House of Delegates election =

2007 Virginia House of Delegates elections
- November 6, 2007

All 100 seats in the Virginia House of Delegates 51 seats needed for a majority
- Turnout: 30.2% ▼
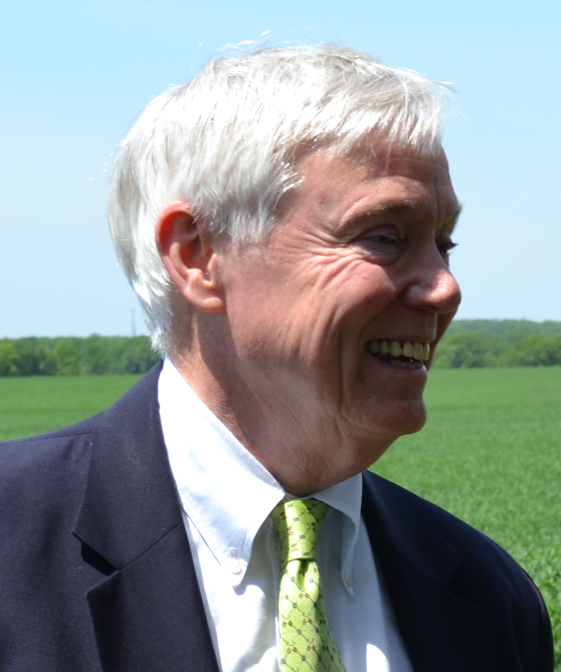

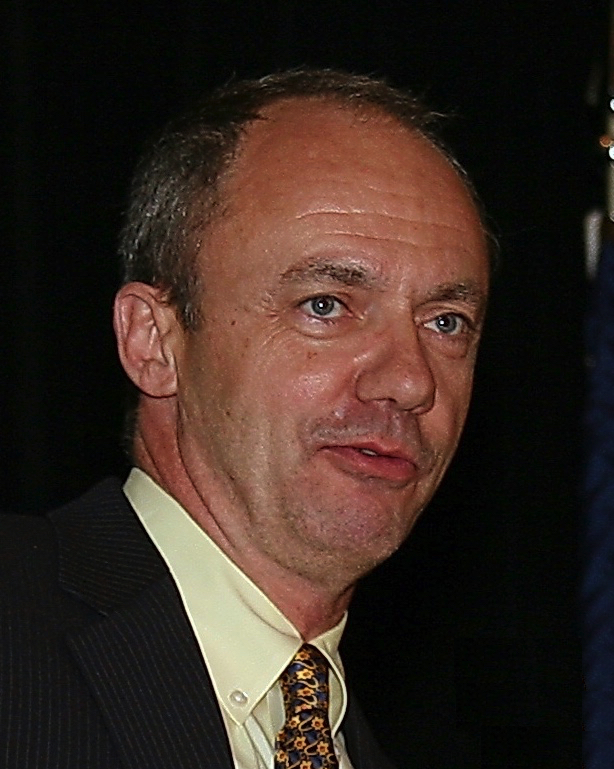
	Majority party	Minority party
Leader	Bill Howell	Ward Armstrong
Party	Republican	Democratic
Leader since	January 8, 2003	February 24, 2007
Leader's seat	28th	10th
Last election	57	40
Seats won	54	44
Seat change	▼3	▲4
Popular vote	620,724	522,604
Percentage	51.0%	42.9%
Swing	▼5.1%	▲6.2%
- Results: Republican hold Republican gain Democratic hold Democratic gain Independent hold
Speaker before election
Bill Howell
Republican
Elected Speaker
Bill Howell
Republican

The Virginia House of Delegates election of 2007 was held on Tuesday, November 6.

== Results ==
=== Overview ===
↓
54	44	2
Republican	Democratic

Parties		Candidates	Seats				Popular Vote		
Parties		Candidates	2005	2007	+/-	Strength	Vote	%	Change
	Republican		57	54	▼3	59.00%	620,724	50.98%	
	Democratic		40	44	▲4	45.00%	522,604	42.92%	
	Independent		3	2	▼1	2.00%	53,157	4.37%	
	Independent Greens		0	0	Steady	0.00%	4,376	0.36%	
-	Write-ins		0	0	Steady	0.00%	16,812	1.38%	
Total			100	100	0	100.00%	1,217,673	100.00%	-

=== By House of Delegates district ===
Party abbreviations: D - Democratic, R - Republican, I - Independent, IG - Independent Green, L - Libertarian

Note: Only House districts that were contested by more than one candidate are included here.

District	Incumbent	Party	Elected	Status	2007 Result
1st	Terry Kilgore	Republican	1993	Reelected	Terry Kilgore (R) 72.3% Jerry Taylor (D) 27.6%
5th	Bill Carrico	Republican	2001	Reelected	Bill Carrico (R) 55.4% Susie Dixon Garner (D) 44.5%
6th	Anne Crockett-Stark	Republican	2005	Reelected	Anne Crockett-Stark (R) 55.6% Bill Thomas Jr. (D) 44.3%
7th	Dave Nutter	Republican	2001	Reelected	Dave Nutter (R) 52.7% Peggy Frank (D) 47.3%
9th	Allen Dudley	Republican	1993	Retired	Charles Poindexter (R) 46.4% Eric Ferguson (D) 43.9% Jerry Boothe (I) 9.6%
11th	Onzlee Ware	Democratic	2003	Reelected	Onzlee Ware (D) 62.1% Mac McCadden (I) 37.3%
13th	Bob Marshall	Republican	1991	Reelected	Bob Marshall (R) 58.3% Bruce Roemmelt (D) 41.6%
14th	Danny Marshall III	Republican	2001	Reelected	Danny Marshall III (R) 51.9% Adam Tomer (D) 48.0%
16th	Robert Hurt	Republican	2001	Elected to State Senate	Donald Merricks (R) 64.0% Andy Parker (D) 35.9%
17th	William Fralin	Republican	2003	Reelected	William Fralin (R) 75.1% Alexander Ballin (I) 24.7%
19th	Lacey Putney	Independent	1961	Reelected	Lacey Putney (I) 72.6% Lewis Medlin Jr. (D) 27.2%
21st	John Welch	Republican	2001	Defeated	Bobby Mathieson (D) 57.5% John Welch (R) 42.1%
26th	Matt Lohr	Republican	2005	Reelected	Matt Lohr (R) 71.1% Carolyn Frank (I) 28.5%
28th	Bill Howell	Republican	1987	Reelected	William Howell (R) 61.7% Clyde Matthews (D) 34.8% Craig Ennis (IG) 3.2%
31st	Scott Lingamfelter	Republican	2001	Reelected	Scott Lingamfelter (R) 55.3% Bill Day (D) 44.5%
32nd	David Poisson	Democratic	2005	Reelected	David Poisson (D) 52.8% Lynn Chapman (R) 47.1%
33rd	Joe May	Republican	1993	Reelected	Joe May (R) 59.8% Marty Martinez (D) 40.0%
34th	Vince Callahan	Republican	1967	Retired	Margi Vanderhye (D) 51.5% Dave Hunt (R) 48.4%
35th	Steve Shannon	Democratic	2003	Reelected	Steve Shannon (D) 63.4% Arthur Purves (R) 36.6%
39th	Vivian Watts	Democratic	1995	Reelected	Vivian Watts (D) 78.3% Laura C. Clifton (IG) 21.2%
40th	Tim Hugo	Republican	2003	Reelected	Tim Hugo (R) 57.1% Rex Simmons (D) 42.8%
45th	David Englin	Democratic	2005	Reelected	David Englin (D) 64.2% Mark Allen (R) 35.7%
49th	Adam Ebbin	Democratic	2003	Reelected	Adam Ebbin (D) 79.7% James Ronald Fisher (IG) 19.1%
50th	Jackson Miller	Republican	2006	Reelected	Jackson Miller (R) 60.4% Jeanette Rishell (D) 39.5%
51st	Michèle McQuigg	Republican	1997	Elected to Clerk of Court	Paul Nichols (D) 51.8% Faisal Gill (R) 47.7%
52nd	Jeff Frederick	Republican	2003	Reelected	Jeff Frederick (R) 58.6% Christopher Brown (D) 41.2%
54th	Bobby Orrock	Republican	1989	Reelected	Bobby Orrock (R) 73.7% Kimbra Kincheloe (I) 26.2%
56th	Bill Janis	Republican	2001	Reelected	Bill Janis (R) 65.9% Will Shaw (D) 34.0%
59th	Watkins Abbitt	Independent	1985	Reelected	Watkins Abbitt (I) 60.2% Connie Brennan (D) 39.7%
67th	Chuck Caputo	Democratic	2005	Reelected	Chuck Caputo (D) 52.7% Marc Cadin (R) 47.3%
68th	Katherine Waddell	Independent	2005	Defeated	Manoli Loupassi (R) 54.1% Katherine Waddell (I) 42.1% Bill Grogan (I) 3.7%
69th	Frank Hall	Democratic	1975	Reelected	Frank Hall (D) 82.8% Ray Gargiulo (R) 17.0%
72nd	Jack Reid	Republican	1989	Retired	Jimmie Massie (R) 67.2% Tom Herbert (D) 32.7%
78th	John Cosgrove	Republican	2001	Reelected	John Cosgrove (R) 61.7% Mick Meyer (D) 38.2%
82nd	Bob Purkey	Republican	1985	Reelected	Bob Purkey (R) 60.6% Bob MacIver (D) 39.2%
83rd	Leo Wardrup	Republican	1991	Retired	Joe Bouchard (D) 50.6% Chris Stolle (R) 49.2%
86th	Tom Rust	Republican	2001	Reelected	Tom Rust (R) 52.8% Jay Donahue (D) 47.1%
87th	Paula Miller	Democratic	2005	Reelected	Paula Miller (D) 54.0% Hank Giffin (R) 45.8%
88th	Mark Cole	Republican	2001	Reelected	Mark Cole (R) 62.2% Carlos Del Toro (D) 37.6%
94th	Glenn Oder	Republican	2001	Reelected	Glenn Oder (R) 74.3% William D. Pelkey (I) 25.1%
96th	Melanie Rapp	Republican	2001	Retired	Brenda Pogge (R) 56.8% Troy Farlow (D) 36.6% Pam Pouchot (I) 6.1%

== See also ==
- 2007 United States elections
- 2007 Virginia elections
  - 2007 Virginia Senate election
