= 2011 Virginia House of Delegates election =

2011 Virginia House of Delegates elections
- November 8, 2011

All 100 seats in the Virginia House of Delegates 51 seats needed for a majority
- Turnout: 28.6% ▼11.8
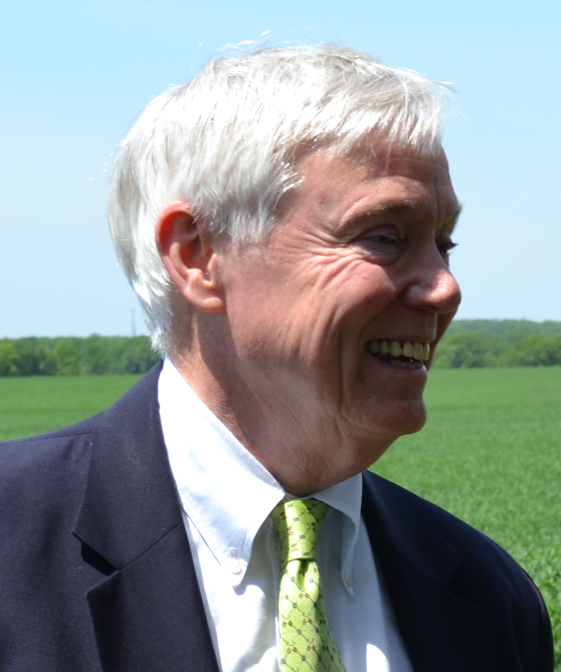

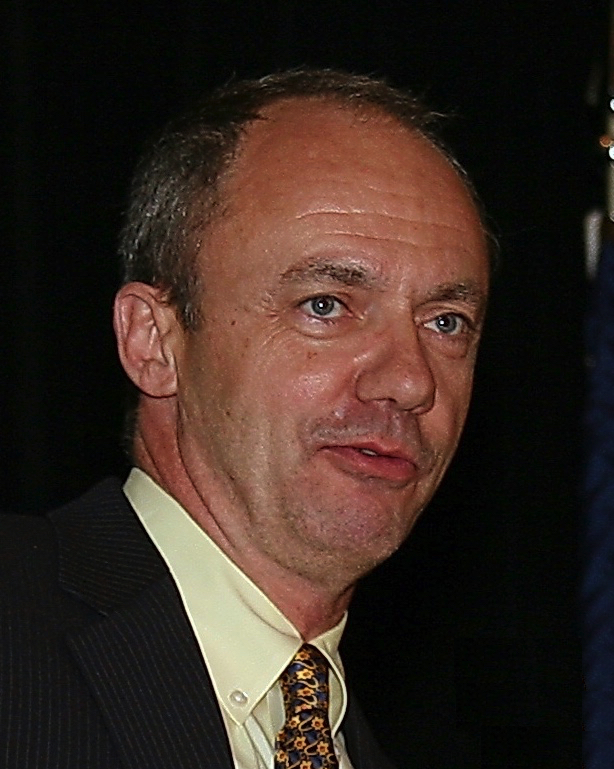
	Majority party	Minority party
Leader	Bill Howell	Ward Armstrong (lost re-election)
Party	Republican	Democratic
Leader since	January 8, 2003	February 24, 2007
Leader's seat	28th	9th
Last election	59	39
Seats won	67	32
Seat change	▲8	▼7
Popular vote	762,993	438,174
Percentage	59.8%	34.4%
Swing	▲3.0%	▼1.8%
- Results: Republican hold Republican gain Democratic hold Independent hold
Speaker before election
Bill Howell
Republican
Elected Speaker
Bill Howell
Republican

The Virginia House of Delegates election of 2011 was held on Tuesday, November 8. Before the election, the House of Delegates consisted of 58 Republicans, 39 Democrats, 2 Independents, with one vacant seat previously held by a Republican (Glenn Oder of the 94th district, who resigned in August 2011). Redistricting eliminated three seats: Southwestern Virginia's 2nd district, the Martinsville-area 10th district, and the Norfolk-based 87th district. These three seats were moved to Northern Virginia. Republicans gained seven seats from the Democrats and one seat from a retiring independent, making the House's composition 67 Republicans, 32 Democrats, and 1 Independent.

Thirteen incumbents chose not to seek another term in the House: Bud Phillips (D-2), Bill Carrico (R-5), Dave Nutter (R-7), Jim Shuler (D-12), Bill Cleaveland (R-17), Clay Athey (R-18), Adam Ebbin (D-49), Bill Janis (R-56), Watkins Abbitt, Jr. (I-59), Paula Miller (D-87), Glenn Oder (R-94), Harvey Morgan (R-98), and Albert C. Pollard (R-99).

Three Delegates retired in order to seek State Senate seats: Bill Carrico (R-5) opted to run for the open 40th district seat, Dave Nutter (R-7) decided to challenge incumbent Democratic Senator John Edwards in the 21st district, and Adam Ebbin (D-49) chose to run for the open 30th district seat. Del. Ward Armstrong (D-10) decided to challenge Republican Del. Charles Poindexter in the 9th district rather than retire.

== Results ==
=== Overview ===
↓
67	32	1
Republican	Democratic

Parties		Candidates	Seats				Popular Vote		
Parties		Candidates	2009	2011	+/-	Strength	Vote	%	Change
	Republican		59	67	▲8	67.00%	762,993	59.84%	
	Democratic		39	32	▼7	32.00%	438,174	34.37%	
	Independent		2	1	▼1	1.00%	37,956	2.98%	
	Libertarian		0	0	Steady	0.00%	7,623	0.60%	
	Independent Greens		0	0	Steady	0.00%	3,555	0.28%	
-	Write-ins		0	0	Steady	0.00%	24,715	1.94%	
Total			100	100	0	100.00%	1,275,016	100.00%	-

== Predictions ==
Source	Ranking	As of
Ballotpedia	Safe R	October 31, 2011

== By House of Delegates district ==
Party abbreviations: D - Democratic Party, R - Republican Party, L - Libertarian Party, IG - Independent Green Party, I - Independent.

District	Incumbent	Party	Elected	Status	2011 Result
2nd	Bud Phillips	Democratic	1989	Retired (District eliminated); Republican pickup	Mark Dudenhefer (R) 56.0% Esteban Garces (D) 43.8%
3rd	Will Morefield	Republican	2009	Reelected	Will Morefield (R) 59.7% Vern Presley (D) 40.3%
5th	Bill Carrico	Republican	2001	Elected to State Senate; Republican hold	Israel O'Quinn (R) 69.3% Michael Osborne (I) 30.4%
9th	Charles Poindexter	Republican	2007	Reelected	Charles Poindexter (R) 52.7% Ward Armstrong (D) 47.2%
10th	Ward Armstrong	Democratic	1991	Ran in 9th District (District eliminated); Republican pickup	Randy Minchew (R) 58.4% David Butler (D) 41.6%
12th	Jim Shuler	Democratic	1993	Retired; Republican pickup	Joseph Yost (R) 51.6% Don Langrehr (D) 48.3%
13th	Bob Marshall	Republican	1991	Reelected	Bob Marshall (R) 59.6% Carl Genthner (D) 40.3%
17th	Bill Cleaveland	Republican	2009	Retired; Republican hold	Chris Head (R) 65.5% Freeda Cathcart (D) 34.3%
18th	Clay Athey	Republican	2001	Retired; Republican hold	Michael Webert (R) 69.4% Bob Zwick (D) 30.4%
19th	Lacey E. Putney	Independent	1961	Reelected	Lacey E. Putney (I) 41.6% Jerry Johnson (R) 31.7% Lewis Medlin (D) 26.6%
20th	Dickie Bell	Republican	2009	Reelected	Dickie Bell (R) 71.1% Laura Kleiner (D) 28.8%
21st	Ron Villanueva	Republican	2009	Reelected	Ron Villanueva (R) 57.3% Adrianne Bennett (D) 42.5%
31st	Scott Lingamfelter	Republican	2001	Reelected	Scott Lingamfelter (R) 58.6% Roy Coffey (D) 41.2%
34th	Barbara Comstock	Republican	2009	Reelected	Barbara Comstock (R) 54.8% Pam Danner (D) 45.1%
36th	Kenneth R. Plum	Democratic	1981	Reelected	Kenneth R. Plum (D) 64.1% Mac Cannon (R) 35.9%
37th	David Bulova	Democratic	2005	Reelected	David Bulova (D) 58.3% Brian Schoeneman (R) 41.7%
38th	Kaye Kory	Democratic	2009	Reelected	Kaye Kory (D) 77.1% James Leslie (IG) 22.8%
39th	Vivian E. Watts	Democratic	1995	Reelected	Vivian E. Watts (D) 76.5% Dimitri Kolazas (I) 23.1%
40th	Tim Hugo	Republican	2002	Reelected	Tim Hugo (R) 74.1% Dianne Blais (I) 25.7%
41st	Eileen Filler-Corn	Democratic	2010	Reelected	Eileen Filler-Corn (D) 68.3% Michael Kane (L) 31.5%
42nd	Dave Albo	Republican	1993	Reelected	Dave Albo (R) 62.1% Jack Dobbyn (D) 37.8%
44th	Scott Surovell	Democratic	2009	Reelected	Scott Surovell (D) 59.4% John Barsa (R) 39.1% Joseph Glean (I) 1.5%
48th	Bob Brink	Democratic	1997	Reelected	Bob Brink (D) 68.4% Kathleen Mallard (I) 24.3% Janet Murphy (IG) 6.9%
52nd	Luke Torian	Democratic	2009	Reelected	Luke Torian (D) 60.6% Cleveland Anderson (R) 39.1%
54th	Bobby Orrock	Republican	1989	Reelected	Bobby Orrock (R) 73.2% Matthew David Simpson (I) 25.0%
57th	David Toscano	Democratic	2005	Reelected	David Toscano (D) 80.4% Robert Smith (I) 19.1%
59th	Watkins Abbitt, Jr.	Independent	1985	Retired; Republican pickup	Matt Fariss (R) 53.0% Connie Brennan (D) 41.2% Linda Wall (I) 5.6%
64th	Bill Barlow	Democratic	1991	Defeated	Richard Morris (R) 55.2% Bill Barlow (D) 44.6%
67th	James LeMunyon	Republican	2009	Reelected	James LeMunyon (R) 59.2% Eric Clingan (D) 40.7%
74th	Joe Morrissey	Democratic	2007	Reelected	Joe Morrissey (D) 72.9% Dwayne Whitehead (I) 26.8%
75th	Roslyn Tyler	Democratic	2005	Reelected	Roslyn Tyler (D) 65.9% Al Peschke (R) 33.8%
87th	Paula Miller	Democratic	2004	Retired (District eliminated); Republican pickup	David Ramadan (R) 49.9% Mike Kondratick (D) 49.5%
93rd	Robin Abbott	Democratic	2009	Defeated	Michael Watson (R) 51.7% Robin Abbott (D) 48.1%
94th	vacant				David Yancey (R) 59.9% Gary West (D) 39.9%
95th	Mamye BaCote	Democratic	2003	Reelected	Mamye BaCote (D) 76.7% Glenn McGuire (L) 22.7%
98th	Harvey Morgan	Republican	1979	Retired; Republican hold	Keith Hodges (R) 78.3% Andrew Shoukas (D) 21.4%
99th	Albert C. Pollard	Democratic	2008	Retired; Republican pickup	Margaret Ransone (R) 69.1% Nicholas Smith (D) 30.7%

=== Seats that changed hands ===
Democratic to Republican (7)

- 2nd district
- 10th district
- 12th district
- 20th district
- 64th district
- 93rd district
- 99th district

Independent to Republican (1)

- 59th district

== See also ==
- 2011 United States elections
- 2011 Virginia elections
  - 2011 Virginia Senate election
