= 2017 Virginia elections =

- November 7, 2017

Statewide and municipal elections were held in the U.S. state of Virginia on November 7, 2017. The main election being held in Virginia was the state's gubernatorial election. In addition, all of Virginia's House of Delegates seats were up for re-election. Primary elections for the House of Delegates and the governor were held on June 13, 2017. Ralph Northam (D) was elected to become the 73rd governor of Virginia, Justin Fairfax (D) was elected to become the 41st lieutenant governor of Virginia, and Mark Herring (D) was reelected as the 47th attorney general of Virginia.

== Governor ==
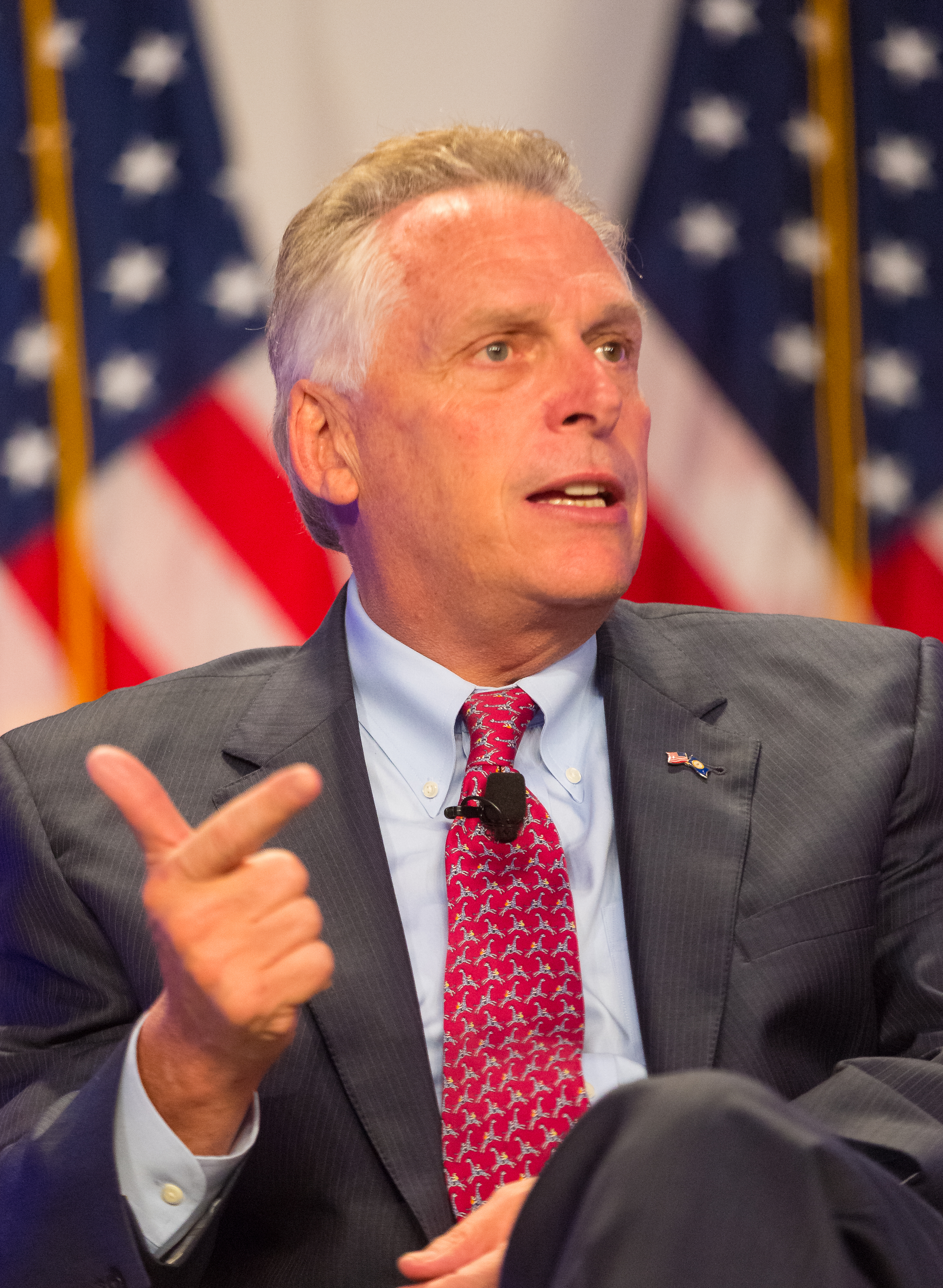
Incumbent Democrat, Terry McAuliffe was term-limited and could not seek re-election.

The Virginia gubernatorial election of 2017 took place on November 7, 2017. Primaries took place on June 13, 2017. The incumbent governor, Democrat Terry McAuliffe, was not eligible to run for re-election due to term limits established by the Virginia Constitution. Virginia is the only state that prohibits its governor from serving consecutive terms.

The primary elections took place on June 13, 2017. Virginia utilizes an open primary, in which registered voters are allowed to vote in only one party's primary election.

Ralph Northam won the election to become the 73rd governor of Virginia with 53.7% of the popular vote.

2017 Virginia gubernatorial election
Party	Candidate	Votes	%	±%
Democratic	Ralph Northam	1,409,175	53.90	+6.15
Republican	Ed Gillespie	1,175,731	44.97	–0.26
Libertarian	Cliff Hyra	27,987	1.07	–5.45
Write-in		1,389	0.05	
Total votes		2,614,282	100.00	
Democratic hold				

== Lieutenant governor ==
The Virginia lieutenant gubernatorial election of 2017 took place on November 7, 2017. The incumbent lieutenant governor, Democrat Ralph Northam, did not seek re-election in order to run for governor.

Justin Fairfax won the election to become the 41st lieutenant governor of Virginia with 52.7% of the popular vote.

2017 Virginia lieutenant gubernatorial election
Party	Candidate	Votes	%	±%
Democratic	Justin Fairfax	1,368,261	52.72	–2.40
Republican	Jill Vogel	1,224,519	47.18	+2.64
Write-in		2,446	0.09	
Total votes		2,595,180	100.00	
Democratic hold				

== Attorney general ==
The Virginia Attorney General election of 2017 took place on November 7, 2017. The incumbent attorney general, Democrat Mark Herring, ran for re-election to a second term.

Mark Herring was reelected as the 47th attorney general of Virginia, with 53.3% of the popular vote.

2017 Virginia attorney general election
Party	Candidate	Votes	%	±%
Democratic	Mark Herring (incumbent)	1,385,389	53.34	+3.43
Republican	John Donley Adams	1,209,339	46.56	–3.31
Write-in		2,486	0.10	
Total votes		2,597,214	100.00	
Democratic hold				

== House of Delegates elections ==
All 100 seats were up for election in November.

Notable races

- The election in the 94th district was an exact tie between Republican David Yancey and Democrat Shelly Simonds, which was eventually decided by a random drawing. This race had added significance, as Yancey's win gave the Republicans 51 total seats in the 100-seat house, and thus a majority for the following term.
- Danica Roem became the first openly transgender candidate elected to a state legislature in the United States, unseating socially conservative incumbent Bob Marshall.
- Chris Hurst, whose girlfriend was murdered on live TV in 2015, was elected to the House of Delegates, defeating incumbent Joseph Yost.
- House Majority Whip Jackson Miller was defeated by Lee Carter, a 30-year-old Marine veteran endorsed by the Democratic Socialists of America.
- Elizabeth Guzmán and Hala Ayala became the first Latina members of the House.
- Kathy Tran became the first Asian American woman delegate after defeating Republican Lolita Mancheno-Smoak.
- Dawn Adams became the first openly lesbian state lawmaker after defeating Republican incumbent, G.M. "Manoli" Loupassi.

== Local elections ==
In an April 18, 2017 special election, Jacqueline Smith was elected Prince William County Clerk of Circuit Court. The fact that she won with an eight-point margin of victory after having been outspent seven-to-one by a politician with greater name recognition was viewed by Republicans as a sign of Democratic momentum. Democratic state senator Jeremy McPike argued that Smith's victory boded well for Democratic turnout in the state election.

In a special election in Chesterfield County on November 7, Jenefer Hughes defeated Republican incumbent Tim McPeters with over 55% of the vote to become the county's next Commissioner of Revenue, marking the first time in over 37 years the post had gone to a Democrat.
