= 1981 Virginia House of Delegates election =

Virginia House of Delegates election, 1981
- November 3, 1981

All 100 seats in the Virginia House of Delegates 51 seats needed for a majority
- Turnout: 64.8% ▲
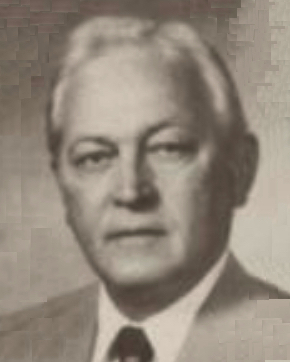

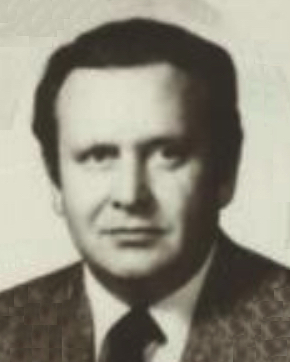
	Majority party	Minority party
Leader	A. L. Philpott	Jerry Geisler (lost re-election)
Party	Democratic	Republican
Leader since	January 9, 1980	September 11, 1974
Leader's seat	12th	5th
Last election	74	25
Seats won	66	33
Seat change	▼8	▲8
Speaker before election
A. L. Philpott
Democratic
Elected Speaker
A. L. Philpott
Democratic

The Virginia House of Delegates election of 1981 was held on Tuesday, November 3. Primary elections were held on September 8, 1981.

The districts were established by the Assembly Act of August 11, 1981 (Acts of Assembly, 1981 Special Session, Chapter 5). They were challenged in Federal District Court, which found the map unconstitutional in Cosner v. Dalton. The Court allowed the 1981 elections to proceed under the August 11, 1981 Act, but for a one-year term only. A new general election would thus be held in November 1982, under a new map.

The 50 multi-member districts, electing 100 delegates in total, were as follows (52, without a 31st or 40th district):

District	Delegates
1st	2
2nd	2
3rd	2
4th	1
5th	3
6th	2
7th	2
8th	1
9th	2
10th	2
11th	2
12th	2
13th	3
14th	1
15th	2
16th	1
17th	1
18th	1
19th	1
20th	1
21st	2
22nd	3
23rd	3
24th	2
25th	1
26th	1
27th	2
29th	1
30th	1
32nd	4
33rd	4
34th	3
35th	1
36th	2
37th	5
38th	5
39th	2
41st	2
42nd	1
43rd	1
44th	1
45th	2
46th	1
47th	1
48th	3
49th	3
50th	3
51st	3
52nd	3

== See also ==
- 1981 United States elections
- 1981 Virginia elections
  - 1981 Virginia gubernatorial election
  - 1981 Virginia lieutenant gubernatorial election
  - 1981 Virginia Attorney General election
