= Joseph Yost =

Joseph Yost may refer to:

- Joseph W. Yost (1847–1923), American architect
- Joseph R. Yost (born 1986), American politician
