= Marie March =

Virginia politician

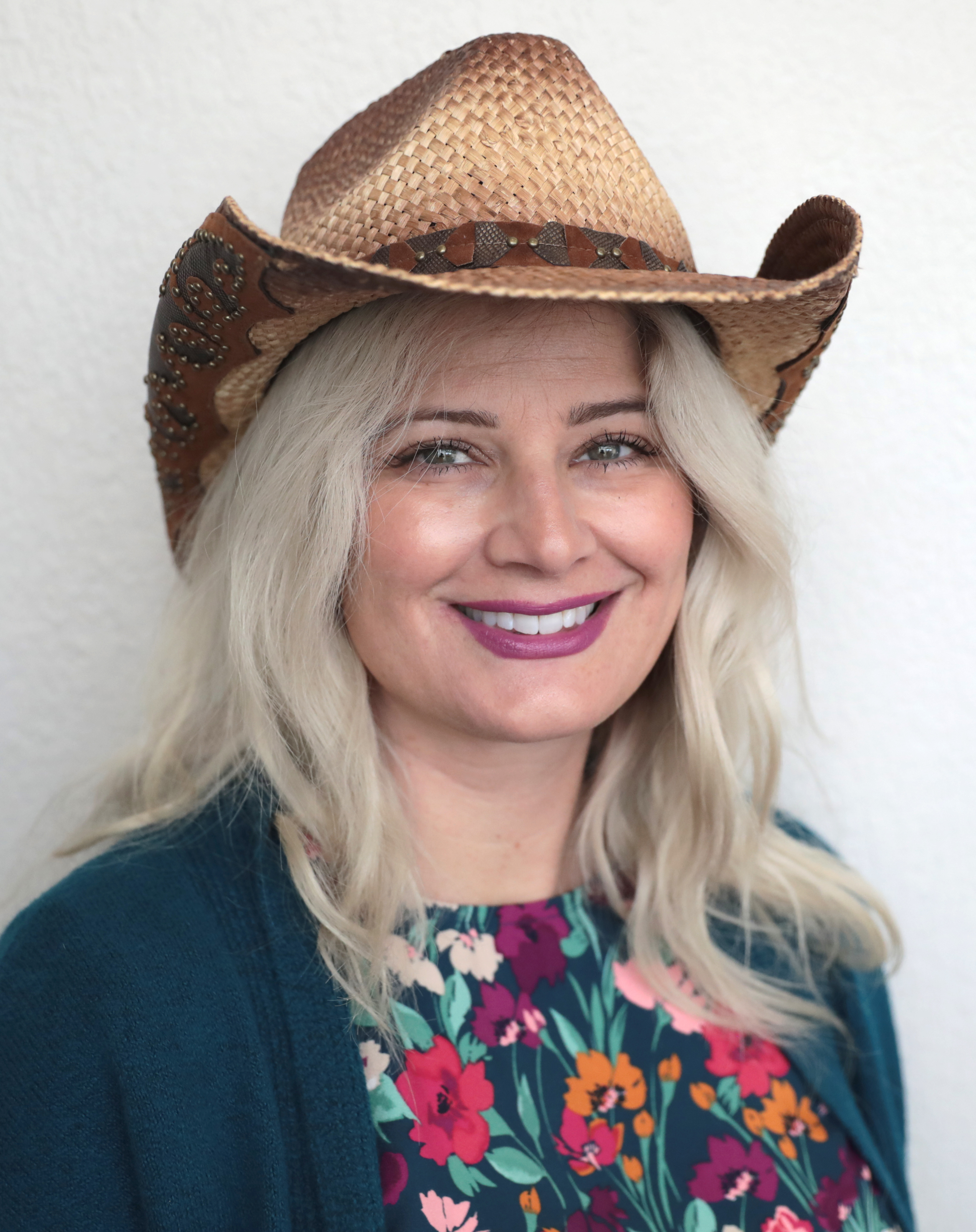
- March at the 2022 Hazlitt Summit hosted by Young Americans for Liberty Foundation

Member of the Virginia House of Delegates from the 7th district
- In office January 12, 2022 – January 10, 2024
- Preceded by: Nick Rush
- Succeeded by: Karen Keys-Gamarra (redistricting)

Personal details
- Party: Republican

Marie March is an American restaurateur and politician who is a former delegate for the 7th district of the Virginia House of Delegates. March, a Republican, defeated Democratic nominee businessman Derek Kitts in the 2021 Virginia House of Delegates election.

March attended Donald Trump's rally on January 6, 2021, prior to the attack on the US Capitol. She claims to have left before the riot began.

In June 2023, March lost the Republican renomination for the 2023 Virginia House of Delegates election in a redistricting race to fellow incumbent Wren Williams.
