= Jason Ballard =

American politician and attorney

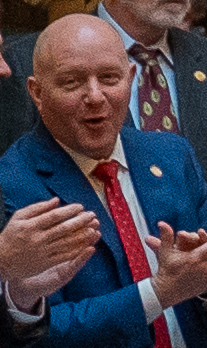

Member of the Virginia House of Delegates
- Incumbent
- Assumed office January 12, 2022
- Preceded by: Chris Hurst
- Constituency: 12th district (2022–2024); 42nd district (2024–present)

Personal details
- Party: Republican
- Children: 3
- Education: Concord University (BA); West Virginia University (JD); The Judge Advocate General's Legal Center and School (LLM)

Military service
- Branch/service: United States Army
- Unit: United States Army Judge Advocate General's Corps

Jason Ballard is an American politician and attorney who is a Republican member of the Virginia House of Delegates for the 42nd district. Elected to the 12th district seat in November 2021, Ballard assumed office on January 12, 2022.

== Education ==
Ballard earned a Bachelor of Arts degree from Concord University, a Juris Doctor from the West Virginia University College of Law, and a Master of Laws from The Judge Advocate General's Legal Center and School.

== Career ==
Ballard served in the United States Army for 12 years, including as a lawyer for the United States Army Judge Advocate General's Corps. Since retiring from the military, he has worked as an attorney and partner at Headley Ballard LLC. He is also a former member of the Pearisburg Town Council. He was elected to the Virginia House of Delegates in November 2021, defeating Democratic incumbent Chris Hurst.

== Electoral history ==
| Date | Election | Candidate | Party | Votes | % |
Virginia House of Delegates, Radford, Giles, Montgomery, Pulaski district
Virginia House of Delegates, 12th district
| Nov 2, 2021 | General | Chris Hurst | Democratic | 11,148 | 44.44 |
| Nov 2, 2021 | General | Jason Ballard | Republican | 13,849 | 55.21 |
| Nov 2, 2021 | General | Write Ins | | 88 | 0.35 |
