= Kelly Convirs-Fowler =

American politician

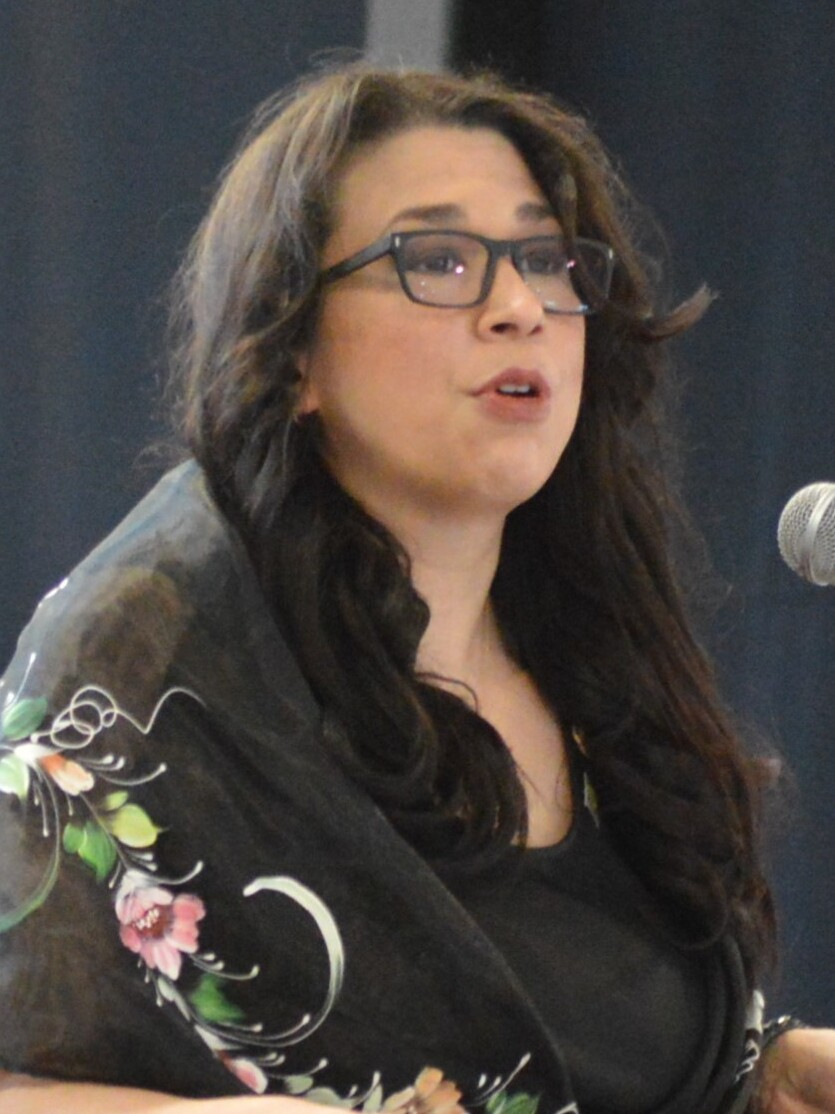

Member of the Virginia House of Delegates
- Incumbent
- Assumed office January 10, 2018
- Preceded by: Ron Villanueva
- Constituency: 21st district (2018–2024); 96th district (2024–present)

Personal details
- Born: Kelly Kristen Convirs Virginia Beach, Virginia, U.S.
- Party: Democratic
- Spouse: William Fowler
- Children: 3
- Education: Virginia Wesleyan College; Old Dominion University

Kelly Convirs-Fowler is an American politician from Virginia. Since 2018, she has served in the Virginia House of Delegates, representing District 96. She was first elected in November 2017. In the 2023 election, she was elected in District 96.

Fowler serves on the Privileges and Elections Committee and the Science and Technology Committee.

== Early life and career ==
Kelly Convirs-Fowler was born and raised in Virginia Beach. She is of Filipino and Mexican descent. She graduated from Tallwood High School and Virginia Wesleyan College, where she majored in Psychology and Criminal Justice. Both schools are in Virginia Beach. After earning her Master's degree in Education at the Old Dominion University, she began teaching at Lynnhaven Elementary. She left her job to begin a home renovation business with her husband. They specialize in serving military families.

== Political career ==
Fowler ran to be a delegate in Virginia's 2017 election against incumbent Ron Villanueva (also a Filipino American). She won the election with 52.3% of the vote, and took office in January 2018. She and Kathy Tran were the first Asian-American women to be elected to Virginia's House of Delegates.

Fowler ran for reelection in the 2019 election. She defeated Republican Shannon D.S. Kane with 54.5% of the vote.

Fowler ran for a third term in the 2021 election. In one of the closest races in Virginia that year, she defeated Tanya Gould by 1% of the vote.

During the 2020 special session, Fowler abstained on HB5013 which was intended to end qualified immunity for law enforcement following the 2020 summer Black Lives Matter protests. Her abstention was due to her own husband, David Fowler, being a deputy sheriff, which effectively killed the bill.

In the 2023 Virginia House of Delegates election, she was elected in District 96. Her chief of staff is Rennie Wilkinson.

== Political positions ==
=== Reproductive rights ===
Fowler is committed to advocating for reproductive freedom, believing that every person has the right to make their own decisions about their reproductive health. Fowler supports access to contraception, safe and legal abortion, and sex education.

== Personal life ==
She is married to William Fowler, and they have three kids. William Fowler was a deputy sheriff sergeant and was fired after the Virginia Beach sheriff "lost confidence in [his] ability to serve the community". Fowler sued for wrongful termination in 2022.

She came out as bisexual at a Pride event in Virginia Beach on June 26, 2022.

== Controversies ==
In 2017, while running for her first term in the House of Delegates, Fowler pledged not to accept campaign contributions from Dominion Energy, Virginia's state-regulated electric utility monopoly. She later sponsored legislation in 2022 to ban Dominion from making campaign contributions to Virginia candidates. Despite that pledge and her own legislation, Fowler accepted $125,000 from Dominion beginning in 2025. Dominion's contributions accounted for approximately 90% of the money she raised during the reporting period ending September 15, 2025.

Fowler has repeatedly changed course after announcing plans to seek other elected offices. In 2022, she said she intended to run for the Virginia Senate in SD-22 before later deciding not to enter the race. In 2024, she announced a campaign for the Virginia Beach School Board and said she would resign from the House of Delegates if elected, but withdrew from the race just over two months before Election Day. Each reversal required party leaders, supporters, and campaign staff to revise plans that had been made based on her stated intentions.

In 2023, Convirs-Fowler announced that she had obtained a laptop she said belonged to the 2019 Virginia Beach mass shooter and publicly questioned whether investigators had overlooked key evidence. Rather than immediately turning the device over to law enforcement for forensic examination, she held the laptop while calling for an independent review of the investigation. Critics argued that if the laptop could contain relevant evidence, it should have been turned over to investigators immediately instead of becoming the subject of a public dispute.

== Electoral history ==
Year	Subject	Party	Votes	%	Opponent	Party	Votes	%	Opponent	Party	Votes	%
21st Virginia House of Delegates District
2017	Kelly Convirs-Fowler	Democratic	12,540	52.5	Ron Villanueva (inc)	Republican	11,309	47.3				
2019	Kelly Convirs-Fowler (inc)	Democratic	12,402	54.5	Shannon Kane	Republican	10,300	45.3				
2021	Kelly Convirs-Fowler (inc)	Democratic	15,162	50.5%	Tanya Gould	Republican	14,818	49.4%				
96th Virginia House of Delegates District
2023	Kelly Convirs-Fowler	Democratic	11,723	55.2%	Mike Karslake	Republican	8,749	43.2%	Nicholas Olenik	Independent	734	3.5%

== See also ==
- 2017 Virginia House of Delegates election
