= Michèle McQuigg =

American politician (1947–2017)

Michèlle McQuigg

Member of the Virginia House of Delegates from the 51st district
- In office January 16, 1998 – January 9, 2008
- Preceded by: David G. Brickley
- Succeeded by: Paul F. Nichols

Personal details
- Born: September 2, 1947 Bay Shore, New York, U.S.
- Died: February 16, 2017 (aged 69) Woodbridge, Virginia, U.S.
- Party: Republican
- Spouse: Frederick Clancy McQuigg
- Children: 2
- Education: Mary Washington College; Virginia Tech

Michèle McQuigg (September 2, 1947 – February 15, 2017) was a Virginia politician who was a Republican member of the Virginia House of Delegates from 1998 to 2008 before opting not to run for reelection.

== Biography ==
She was elected Prince William County Clerk of Circuit Court on November 6, 2007.

In her capacity as Prince William County Clerk, McQuigg was one of two defendant-appellants in Bostic v. Rainey.

McQuigg died on February 16, 2017, aged 69 at her home in Woodbridge, Virginia.
