= Nick Rush =

American politician

Member of the Virginia House of Delegates from the 7th district
- In office January 11, 2012 – January 12, 2022
- Preceded by: Dave Nutter
- Succeeded by: Marie March

Personal details
- Born: Larry Nicholas Rush; March 8, 1968 (age 58) Christiansburg, Virginia
- Party: Republican
- Spouse: Jennifer Whitaker Rush
- Children: 3
- Profession: Investment Advisor
- Committees: Appropriations; Public Safety; Privileges & Elections; Appropriations Compensation & General Government Subcommittee; Appropriations Elementary & Secondary Education Subcommittee; Appropriations Higher Education Subcommittee; Privileges & Education Campaign Finance Subcommittee; Major Employment & Investment (MEI) Project Approval Commission; Mental Health Services Subcommittee
- Website: nickrush.com

Larry Nicholas "Nick" Rush (born March 8, 1968) is an American politician of the Republican Party. From 2012 to 2022, he was a member of the Virginia House of Delegates representing the 7th district, made up of Floyd County, Montgomery County (part), and Pulaski County (part).

== Early life and education ==
Nick Rush was born March 8, 1968, in Christiansburg, Virginia. After graduating from Christiansburg High School, Rush served the United States Army as a paratrooper in the 82nd Airborne Division. Nick left active duty as a non-commissioned officer in 1989.

== Career ==
At 23 years old, he was elected to the Montgomery County Board of Supervisors as the youngest member in history. Rush served for 12 years on the board representing District B and is a former Chairman and Vice Chairman.

Rush has always been an active member of his community serving it in a volunteer capacity through these statewide and community groups: New River Valley Community Action Board of Directors; New River Valley Economic Development Alliance; Floyd, Pulaski, and Montgomery County Chambers of Commerce.

== Legislative initiatives ==
HB 1733 was introduced by Rush to create the Advanced Production Grant Program and Fund to make grant payments of $7 million over a five-year period to an eligible business transportation manufacturer and producer that engages in the production of business trucks, and that makes a capital investment of at least $58 million at a facility in Pittsylvania County and creates at least 703 new full-time jobs at the facility.

HJ 705 is a recognition of Cameron Crowder Pediatric Care Awareness Day in Virginia annually on October 22 to recognize the work that pediatric emergency care providers do on a daily basis.

HB 2490 is a grant fund established for the Tech Talent Investment Program. This bill creates a grant program to assist qualified public institutions of higher education (defined in the bill) in reaching, by 2039, a goal of increasing by at least 25,000 degrees the number of bachelor's and master's degrees awarded in computer science, computer engineering, and closely related fields, or that otherwise align with traded-sector, technology-focused growth opportunities identified by the Virginia Economic Development Partnership Authority.

HB 2181 authorizes the establishment of the Radford University-Roanoke Division. Through the acquisition of the Jefferson College of Health Sciences, the bill authorizes the Board of Visitors to (i) exercise the same powers with respect to the operation of the Division as are vested in the board regarding the University and (ii) offer at the Division all programs of instruction offered by Jefferson College of Health Sciences at the time of acquisition, including associate-degree programs.

HB 2180 is a bill designed to create a Semiconductor Manufacturing Grant Fund for the awarding of grants to qualified semiconductor manufacturing companies. A grant of up to $50 million in the fiscal year 2020 and a grant of up to $20 million in the fiscal year 2021 can be awarded to those companies that invest at least $2.98 billion in a qualified locality, and those companies that create and maintain 1,106 new jobs with an average annual wage of $92,000 a year for those jobs.

HJ42 is a proposal that establishes the official recognition of General Casimir Pulaski Day in Virginia on October 11. General Pulaski was a Polish military officer that led a fleet across the Atlantic in 1777 to help the Revolutionary forces during the American Revolutionary War. Pulaski wrote to General George Washington saying, "I came here, where freedom is being defended, to serve it, and to live or die for it." Pulaski's cavalry at the Battle of Brandywine on September 11, 1777, not only saved Washington's life, but they also saved the Continental Army from what was sure to be a disastrous defeat. General Pulaski later was fatally wounded in the Second Battle of Savannah and later perished at sea on October 11, 1779. To recognize the sacrifice of General Pulaski, the General Assembly named Pulaski County in honor of the General's service to the American Revolution.

HB2074 is a proposal that establishes an individual and corporate tax break for income earned from investments in venture capital accounts. In order to qualify, an account must have 50% or more of its holdings in qualified portfolio companies, which is defined as a company that has its principal place of business in the Commonwealth of Virginia and that has a primary purpose of production, sale, research, or development of a product or service and provides equity in exchange for the investment. The income tax break is available only for an investment made on or after January 1, 2018, but before December 31, 2023. The bill passed the House and Senate, and was signed by Governor Terry McAuliffe.

HB1692 also known as the ‘Flat-Fee Degree,’ is a higher education proposal introduced during the 2015 Legislative Session. The proposal establishes discounted tuition and fees for students pursuing degrees in high demand fields. Students pursuing high demand degrees, such education, nursing, and Information Technology (IT) have the opportunity to graduate college without massive debt so long as the students satisfy the requirements of the Flat-Fee Degree. These requirements include graduating on time or earlier, relinquishing certain amenities such as on-campus living or football / basketball ticket lotteries, and requiring students to take summer courses in order to use buildings that are underutilized. The bill is currently being studied by the Joint Commission on Higher Education.

HB672 is an economic development bill introduced in the 2014 Legislative Session by Delegate Charles Poindexter and Chief Co-Patroned by Delegate Rush. Under this legislation, if a company creates at least 25 new, permanent, full-time positions within the Commonwealth, that company would be eligible for a one time grant of $1,000 per position. The per-position fund will grow depending on the amount of new, full-time positions created. For example, if a company relocates to Virginia and creates 100 new jobs, that company will be eligible for $3,000 per position, up to a maximum total of $500,000 within a state fiscal year. The bill passed the House and Senate, and was signed by Governor Terry McAuliffe.

HB1485, which was introduced by Rush and passed during the 2013 Legislative Session, is a proposal that would permit the Commissioner of the Virginia Department of Motor Vehicles (DMV) to postpone expiration of vehicle registrations if the DMV is unable to operate for reasons beyond its control. The postponement is then authorized by the Governor. This bill was utilized on January 30, 2015, when an internal power disruption temporarily interrupted DMV electronic services provided by the Commonwealth's data center. This disruption greatly impacted the ability of many Virginians to renew their driver's licenses and vehicle registration, which could have resulted in unnecessary fees for many drivers. However, because of this bill, those fees were prevented.

== Electoral history ==
| Date | Election | Candidate | Party | Votes | % |
Virginia House of Delegates, 7th district
| Nov 8, 2011 | General | Larry N. "Nick" Rush | Republican | 13,709 | 97.40 |
| Nov 8, 2011 | General | Write Ins | | 365 | 2.59 |
| Nov 8, 2011 | General | Dave Nutter retired; seat stayed Republican | | | |
| Nov 5, 2013 | General | Larry N. "Nick" Rush | Republican | 13,238 | 64.97 |
| Nov 5, 2013 | General | Michael S. "Mike" Abraham | Democratic | 7,109 | 34.89 |
| Nov 5, 2013 | General | Write Ins | | 27 | 0.13 |
| Nov 3, 2015 | General | Larry N. "Nick" Rush | Republican | 14,714 | 97.55 |
| Nov 3, 2015 | General | Write Ins | | 370 | 2.45 |
| Nov 7, 2017 | General | Larry N. "Nick" Rush | Republican | 17,560 | 66.34 |
| Nov 7, 2017 | General | Flourette M. Ketner | Democratic | 8,878 | 33.54 |
| Nov 7, 2017 | General | Write Ins | | 30 | 0.11 |
| Nov 5, 2019 | General | Larry N. "Nick" Rush | Republican | 13,842 | 66.74 |
| Nov 5, 2019 | General | Rhonda Seltz | Democratic | 6,883 | 33.19 |
| Nov 5, 2019 | General | Write Ins | | 14 | 0.07 |

== Personal life ==
Nick and his wife, Jennifer currently reside in Christiansburg, Virginia. The couple raised a daughter and two sons.
