= Kathy Tran =

American politician (born 1978)

Member of the Virginia House of Delegates
- Incumbent
- Assumed office January 10, 2018
- Preceded by: Dave Albo
- Constituency: 42nd district (2018–2024); 18th district (2024–present)

Personal details
- Born: 1978 (age 47–48) Vietnam
- Party: Democratic
- Spouse: Matthew Reisman
- Children: 5
- Education: Duke University (BA); University of Michigan (MSW)

Kathy Tran (born 1978) is an American politician who currently serves in the Virginia House of Delegates. A Democrat, she represents the 18th House of Delegates district.

== Early life and career ==
Born in Vietnam, Tran and her parents fled as boat refugees when she was seven months old. She graduated from Duke University and earned a Master of Social Work from the University of Michigan. After graduating, she worked at the Department of Labor for 12 years. She then worked for the advocacy group National Immigration Forum.

== House of Delegates ==
=== Elections ===
Tran decided to run for the House in 2017 after the election of Donald Trump. She ran in the 42nd district, which was then an open seat following the retirement of Republican Delegate Dave Albo, who had served as a Delegate for 24 years. She faced retired social worker Tilly Blanding in the June 2017 Democratic primary and won with 54 percent of the vote.

Tran faced Republican Lolita Mancheno-Smoak, an engineer and Ecuadorian immigrant, in the general election. Republicans accused Democrats of racist smears after the Democratic Party of Virginia sent a mailer to voters depicting Mancheno-Smoak's face next to images of a werewolf and a hockey mask reminiscent of a horror movie with the headline, "This Halloween season, protect your family from the scariest threats." Tran denied that the mailer was racist, saying, "The mailer highlights the frankly scary policies that my opponent supports that would threaten funding for schools, threaten access to affordable health care, and threaten funding for Planned Parenthood. This is what is at stake in our election." Tran defeated Mancheno-Smoak in the general election, receiving 61% of the vote.

In 2025, Tran was re-elected, defeating Republican candidate Ed McGovern, whom she had also run against in 2023, with 72.22% of the vote.

=== Tenure ===
Tran and Kelly Convirs-Fowler were the first Asian-American women to be elected to Virginia's House of Delegates in November 2017. She is the first Vietnamese American elected to state government in the Commonwealth.

In November 2023, Tran was selected as the Democratic Caucus Chair in the Virginia House of Delegates.

== Policy positions ==
=== Abortion ===
On the first day of the 2019 legislative session, Tran introduced the Repeal Act, a bill that would have reduced the number of physicians required to approve a third-trimester abortion in Virginia from three to one, and would have lowered the threshold for approval to "any medical reason" from the previous requirement of the pregnant woman being “substantially and irredeemably” harmed by continuing the pregnancy. The bill would also have allowed second-trimester abortions to be performed in clinics instead of hospitals and would have removed the requirement that an ultrasound be performed before an abortion. The bill drew accusations from Republicans of attempting to legalize infanticide, with Tran receiving death threats against herself and her family. The bill failed to pass the state legislature.

=== Immigration ===
In 2020, Tran introduced a bill to allow immigrants to obtain a driver's license regardless of legal status.

=== Labor ===
In 2021, Tran co-sponsored a bill to add military service members and their families as a protected class, banning discrimination in housing and employment based on military status.

In 2024, 2025, and 2026, Tran introduced a bill to repeal the ban on collective bargaining by public sector and home health workers.

== Electoral history ==
Democratic Primary, 42nd House of Delegates District, June 13, 2017
Party	Candidate	Votes	%
Democratic	Kathy Tran	3,977	53.64
Democratic	Tilly Blanding	3,437	46.36
Total votes		7,414	100

42nd House of Delegates District, General Election, November 7, 2017
Party	Candidate	Votes	%
Democratic	Kathy Tran	18,761	60.97
Republican	Lolita Mancheno-Smoak	11,967	38.89
Independent	Write-in candidates	45	0.15
Total votes		30,773	100

42nd House of Delegates District, General Election, November 5, 2019
Party	Candidate	Votes	%
Democratic	Kathy Tran	16,167	59.66
Republican	Steve Adragna	10,903	40.23
Independent	Write-in candidates	30	0.11
Total votes		27,100	100

42nd House of Delegates District, General Election, November 2, 2021
Party	Candidate	Votes	%
Democratic	Kathy Tran	21,374	60.0
Republican	Ed McGovern	14,186	39.8
Independent	Write-in candidates	56	0.2
Total votes		35,616	100

18th House of Delegates District, General Election, November 7, 2023
Party	Candidate	Votes	%
Democratic	Kathy Tran	15,973	65.58
Republican	Ed McGovern	8,293	34.05
Independent	Write-in candidates	90	0.4
Total votes		24,356	100

18th House of Delegates District, General Election, November 4, 2025
Party	Candidate	Votes	%
Democratic	Kathy Tran	24,582	72.22
Republican	Ed McGovern	9,387	27.58
Independent	Write-in candidates	68	0.2
Total votes		34,037	100

== Personal life ==
Tran is married and the mother of five children.

== See also ==
- 2017 Virginia House of Delegates election
