= Karen Keys-Gamarra =

American politician from Virginia

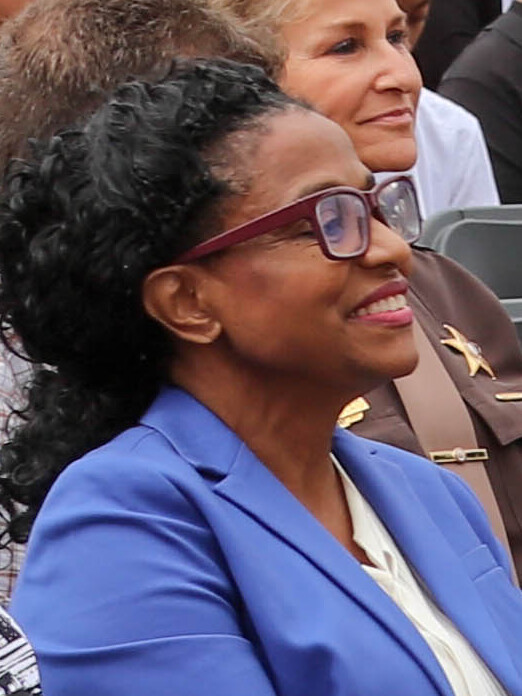
- Keys-Gamarra in 2018

Member of the Virginia House of Delegates from the 7th district
- Incumbent
- Assumed office January 10, 2024
- Preceded by: Ken Plum (Note: Plum was redistricted from the 36th district.)

Personal details
- Born: St. Louis, Missouri, U.S.
- Party: Democratic
- Education: Tulane University (BA); Washington University (JD)

Karen Keys-Gamarra is an American Democratic politician from Virginia. She was elected to the Virginia House of Delegates in the 2023 Virginia House of Delegates election from the 7th district.

She is a child advocate and lawyer, and was a member of the Fairfax County School Board from 2017 until her term in Virginia House of Delegates began in 2024.
