= Virginia's 42nd House of Delegates district =

Virginia legislative district

District map from the 2023 election

Virginia's 42nd House of Delegates district elects one of 100 seats in the Virginia House of Delegates, the lower house of the state's bicameral legislature. Under a redistricting plan effective for the 2023 Virginia House of Delegates election, the district number was reassigned from Northern Virginia's Fairfax County to a new southwestern Virginia district formed from parts of the previous districts 12, 7 and 8, including the independent city of Radford, Giles County, and parts of Montgomery and Pulaski counties.

The old 12th District included Radford, Giles and different parts of Pulaski and Montgomery counties. Significantly, the new 42nd district no longer includes the Montgomery County town of Blacksburg, which had been home to previous Democrat delegates from the 12th, Joan Munford, Jim Shuler and Chris Hurst.

Until redistricting and the 2023 election, District 42 was located in Fairfax County in northern Virginia, and has been represented by Democrat Kathy Tran since 2018.

== Electoral history ==
=== 2017 ===
In 2017, Tran was first elected to a seat previously held by Republican Dave Albo, who was retiring. Tran was the first Asian American woman elected to House of Delegates and part of a wave of new Democratic women whose wins significantly increased the number of Democrats in the House.
