= Paul Haring =

American politician from Texas

Member of the Texas House of Representatives
- In office January 10, 1961 – January 10, 1967

Personal details
- Born: January 18, 1937 (age 89) Bee County, Texas, U.S.
- Party: Democratic (former); Republican (present)
- Spouse: Gloria

Paul Byrne Haring (born January 18, 1937) is an American former politician. He served as a Democratic member in the Texas House of Representatives from 1961 to 1967.
