= Ron Villanueva =

American politician (born 1970)

Ronald Villanueva

Member of the Virginia House of Delegates from the 21st district
- In office January 13, 2010 – January 10, 2018
- Preceded by: Bobby Mathieson
- Succeeded by: Kelly Fowler

Member of the Virginia Beach City Council, At Large
- In office July 1, 2002 – December 31, 2009
- Preceded by: Will Sessoms
- Succeeded by: Rita Sweet Bellitto

Personal details
- Born: March 30, 1970 (age 56) Philadelphia, Pennsylvania
- Party: Republican
- Spouse: Cathy Villanueva
- Education: Old Dominion University (B.A., Political Science, 1992)

Military service
- Allegiance: United States
- Service: United States Coast Guard Reserve (1987-95)

Ron A. Villanueva (born March 30, 1970) is a former member of the Virginia House of Delegates for the 21st district, serving from 2010 to 2018. He is a Republican who first won election in 2009, defeating incumbent Democratic Delegate Bobby Mathieson in the general election. He was sworn in the following January in Richmond, Virginia. Villanueva was the first Filipino American elected to Virginia state government. He was reelected to 4 consecutive terms, but lost his bid for a 5th term on November 7, 2017 to Kelly Convirs-Fowler (herself of Filipino descent).

In 2019, Villanueva pleaded guilty to fraud in regards to misuse of 8(a) Business Development Program; he was sentenced to serve 2 1/2 years in jail, 3 years probation, and $524,000 in restitution. He served his time at FCI Petersburg Low and was released after serving less than a year due to COVID-19 restrictions.

== Electoral history ==
Date	Election	Candidate	Party	Votes	%
Virginia House of Delegates, 21st district
Nov 3, 2009	General	Ron A. Villanueva	Republican	7,673	49.93
Nov 3, 2009	General	R. W. "Bobby" Mathieson	Democratic	7,659	49.84
Nov 3, 2009	General	Write Ins		33	0.21
Nov 3, 2009	General	Incumbent lost; seat switched from Democratic to Republican			
Nov 8, 2011	General	Ron A. Villanueva	Republican	6,194	57.27
Nov 8, 2011	General	Adrienne L. Bennett	Democratic	4,600	42.53
Nov 8, 2011	General	Write Ins		20	0.18
Nov 5, 2013	General	Ron A. Villanueva	Republican	10,642	54.37
Nov 5, 2013	General	Susan Bates Hippen	Democratic	8,895	45.44
Nov 5, 2013	General	Write Ins		38	0.19
Nov 3, 2015	General	Ron A. Villanueva	Republican	6,345	56.9%
Nov 3, 2015	General	Susan Bates Hippen	Democratic	4,812	43.1
Nov 7, 2017	General	Ron A. Villanueva	Republican	11,309	47.31%
Nov 7, 2017	General	Kelly Fowler	Democratic	12,540	52.46%
Nov 7, 2017	General	Write Ins		56	0.23%
Nov 7, 2017	General	Incumbent lost; seat switched from Republican to Democrat			

== 2016 Legislation ==
Chief Patron

(after prefiled period)

Chief Co-Patron

Co-Patron

== Committee assignments ==
=== 2016 legislative session ===
At the beginning of the 2016 legislative session, Villanueva served on the following committees:

Virginia Committee Assignments, 2016
Commerce and Labor
Science and Technology
Transportation, Chair

=== 2015 legislative session ===
Virginia Committee Assignments, 2015
Commerce and Labor
Courts of Justice
Transportation, Vice-chair

=== 2014 legislative session ===
Virginia Committee Assignments, 2014
Commerce and Labor
Courts of Justice
Transportation

=== 2012-2013 legislative session ===
Virginia Committee Assignments, 2012
Courts of Justice
Finance
Transportation

=== 2010-2011 legislative session ===
Virginia Committee Assignments, 2010
Courts of Justice
Finance
Transportation
