= Virginia's 12th House of Delegates district =

Virginia legislative district

Virginia's 12th State House of Delegates district
- District map from the 2023 election
Delegate
Holly Seibold; D–Vienna
- Demographics: 52% White; 6% Black; 10% Hispanic; 25% Asian; 0% Native American; 0% Hawaiian/Pacific Islander; 1% Other; 5% Multiracial
- Population (2024) • Voting age: 89,507; 18
- Registered voters: 62,641

Virginia's 12th House of Delegates district elects one of the hundred Delegates of the Virginia House of Delegates, United States.

Under redistricting effective for the 2023 Virginia House of Delegates election, the 12th district number was reassigned to part of northern Virginia's Fairfax County, while the district number 42, previously used elsewhere in Fairfax, was applied to a new southwestern district including most of the old 12th.

The new District 12 in the Tysons and Vienna area, includes parts of the old districts 34, 35, 37, 39, 41 and 53.

The current Delegate is Democrat Holly Seibold

Before redistricting, the old 12th included the city of Radford, Giles County, and portions of Montgomery County and Pulaski County. After redistricting, most of the old 12th became part of the new 42nd district, formed from parts of the previous districts 12, 7 and 8, still including Radford City and all of Giles County, but incorporating different parts of Pulaski and Montgomery counties. Significantly, the new district no longer includes the Montgomery County town of Blacksburg, which had been home to previous Democratic delegates from the 12th, Joan Munford, Jim Shuler and Chris Hurst.

== Elections ==
Republican Jason Ballard of Pearisburg, was elected 12th district delegate in the 2021 election.

== District officeholders ==
Years	Delegate	Party	Electoral history
January 13, 1982 – January 12, 1983	Mary Sue Terry	Democratic	Redistricted; Elected as delegate in the 10th district
January 12, 1983 – 1990	J. Robert Dobyns	Democratic	
1990 – 1992	Thomas G. Baker, Jr	Republican	
1992 – January 12, 1994	Joan Munford	Democratic	Retired
January 12, 1994 – January 9, 2002	Jim Shuler	Democratic	
January 9, 2002 – January 2004	Creigh Deeds	Democratic	
January 2004 – January 11, 2012	Jim Shuler	Democratic	
January 11, 2012 – January 10, 2018	Joseph R. Yost	Republican	Defeated in bid for reelection
January 10, 2018 – January 12, 2022	Chris Hurst	Democratic	Defeated in bid for re-election
January 12, 2022 – January 10, 2024	Jason Ballard	Republican	First elected in 2021 (redistricted to the 42nd District)
January 10, 2024 – present	Holly Seibold	Democratic	Redistricted from the 35th District

== Electoral history ==
Date	Election	Candidate	Party	Votes	%
Virginia House of Delegates, 12th district
Nov 6, 2001	General	Robert Creigh Deeds	Democratic	12,595	77.7
Nov 6, 2001	General	K. M. Orion	Republican	3,611	22.3
Nov 6, 2001	General	Write Ins		12	0.1
Jan 8, 2002	Special	J. M. Shuler	Democratic	7,284	70.8
Jan 8, 2002	Special	L. J. Linkous	Republican	3,006	29.2
Jan 8, 2002	Special	Write Ins		2	0
Nov 4, 2003	General	J. M. Shuler	Democratic	9,867	99.9
Nov 4, 2003	General	Write Ins		11	0.1
Nov 8, 2005	General	J. M. Shuler	Democratic	14,390	79.1
Nov 8, 2005	General	D. T. Kern	Republican	3,767	20.7
Nov 8, 2005	General	Write Ins		36	0.2
Nov 6, 2007	General	James M. Shuler	Democratic	12,145	99.5
Nov 6, 2007	General	Write Ins		67	0.5
Nov 3, 2009	General	James M. Shuler	Democratic	12,716	72.2
Nov 3, 2009	General	Paul M. Cornett	Republican	4,799	27.3
Nov 3, 2009	General	Write Ins		88	0.5
Nov 8, 2011	General	Joseph Ryan Yost	Republican	8,104	51.6
Nov 8, 2011	General	Donald Brian Langrehr	Democratic	7,582	48.3
Nov 8, 2011	General	Write Ins		19	0.1
Nov 5, 2013	General	Joseph Ryan Yost	Republican	9,541	52.3
Nov 5, 2013	General	James David Harder	Democratic	8,650	47.4
Nov 5, 2013	General	Write Ins		62	0.3
Nov 3, 2015	General	Joseph Ryan Yost	Republican	9,245	58.3
Nov 3, 2015	General	Laurie Ann Buchwald	Democratic	6,587	41.5
Nov 3, 2015	General	Write Ins		23	0.1
Nov 7, 2017	General	Christopher Laird Hurst	Democratic	12,495	54.4
Nov 7, 2017	General	Joseph Ryan Yost	Republican	10,458	45.5
Nov 7, 2017	General	Write Ins		36	0.2
Nov 5, 2019	General	Christopher Laird Hurst	Democratic	11,135	53.6
Nov 5, 2019	General	Travis Forrest Hite	Republican	9,643	46.4
Nov 5, 2019	General	Write Ins		12	0.1
Nov 2, 2021	General	Jason Sherman Ballard	Republican	13,871	55.1
Nov 2, 2021	General	Christopher Laird Hurst	Democratic	11,224	44.6
Nov 2, 2021	General	Write Ins		88	0.3
Nov 7, 2023	General	Holly M. Seibold	Democratic	18,550	92.4
Nov 7, 2023	General	Write Ins		1,519	7.6
