= Paul F. Nichols =

American politician (born 1952)

Member of the Virginia House of Delegates from the 51st district
- In office January 9, 2008 – January 13, 2010
- Preceded by: Michèle McQuigg
- Succeeded by: Richard L. Anderson

Personal details
- Born: October 27, 1952 (age 73) Kingston, Pennsylvania
- Party: Democratic
- Children: Allison Nichols LaPlantie, Paul Nichols
- Education: King's College (Pennsylvania); George Mason University School of Law
- Profession: Lawyer
- Committees: Counties, Cities and Towns; Transportation
- Website: delegatenichols.com

Paul F. Nichols (born October 27, 1952, Kingston, Pennsylvania) is a former delegate to the Virginia General Assembly. A Democrat, he was elected to the Virginia House of Delegates in November 2007.

He represented the 51st district in Prince William County. He was defeated for reelection on November 3, 2009.
