= Bobby Mathieson =

American politician (born 1956)

Member of the Virginia House of Delegates from the 21st district
- In office January 2008 – January 13, 2010
- Preceded by: John Welch
- Succeeded by: Ron Villanueva

Personal details
- Born: June 16, 1956 (age 70) New York City, US
- Party: Democratic
- Spouse: Terry Rookus
- Children: Robert Jr., Daniel
- Education: St. Leo University
- Occupation: Business administration
- Committees: Agriculture, Chesapeake and Natural Resources; Science and Technology
- Website: www.bobby21.com

Robert W. "Bobby" Mathieson (born June 16, 1956, in New York City) is an American politician. A Democrat, he was elected to the Virginia House of Delegates in November 2007, representing the 21st district in the city of Virginia Beach. He lost the seat in 2009 to Ron Villanueva. On July 1, 2011, the United States Senate confirmed Mathieson as a U.S. Marshal serving Virginia's Eastern District.
