= Jim Shuler =

American politician

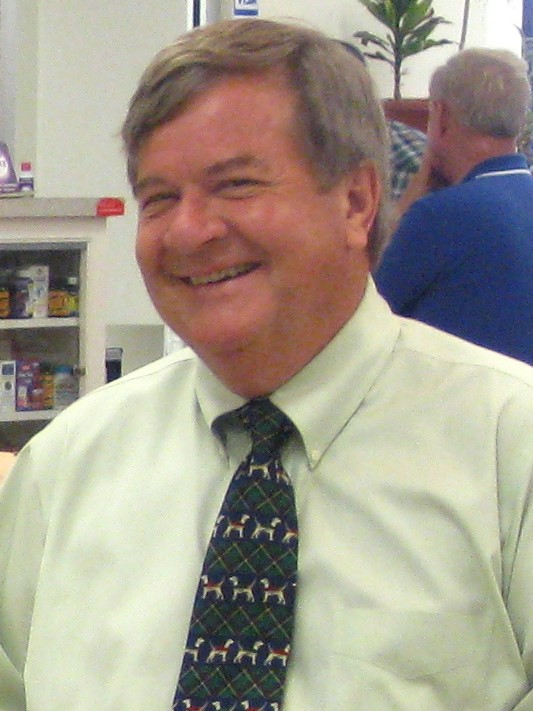

Member of the Virginia House of Delegates from the 12th district
- In office January 12, 1994 – January 11, 2012
- Preceded by: Joan Munford
- Succeeded by: Joseph R. Yost

Personal details
- Born: James Marshall Shuler; December 31, 1943 (age 82) Rockingham County, Virginia, U.S.
- Party: Democratic
- Spouse: Margaret Sue Flippin
- Children: Laurel Moore, Marshall Shuler
- Education: Virginia Tech (B.S.); University of Georgia (D.V.M.)
- Profession: Veterinarian

James Marshall Shuler (born December 31, 1943) is a retired American politician. He served in the Virginia House of Delegates from 1994 to 2012, representing the 12th district in the western part of the state. Shuler is a member of the Democratic Party.

Shuler served on the House committees on Agriculture (1994–2001), Agriculture, Chesapeake and Natural Resources (2002–2011), Corporations, Insurance and Banking (1994–2001), Education (2004–2011), Labor and Commerce (1994–1997), Militia, Police and Public Safety (2002–2011), Mining and Mineral Resources (1994–2001), and Science and Technology (1998–2001).

== Early life, education ==
Shuler was born in Rockingham County, Virginia. He received a B.S. degree from Virginia Tech in 1966 and a doctorate in veterinary medicine from the University of Georgia in 1970.

== Electoral history ==
Shuler served on the Blacksburg, Virginia Town Council 1982–1988.

In 1993, when Democrat Joan Munford retired from the House of Delegates 12th district seat after six terms, Shuler became the Democratic nominee, and won the seat.

The Republican majority substantially redrew the 12th district during the 2001 redistricting. The district, which had been based in Giles and Montgomery Counties, expanded northward to include all of Alleghany, Bath and Craig Counties, as well as the independent cities of Covington and Clifton Forge (which reverted to town status within Alleghany County in 2002); this put 18th district incumbent and fellow Democrat Creigh Deeds in the 12th with Shuler. Shuler moved from Blacksburg to Pulaski County and ran for the open 7th district seat, but lost to Republican Dave Nutter in the November 6, 2001, general election, while Deeds won in the redrawn 12th.

State Senator Emily Couric had died of pancreatic cancer on October 18, three weeks before the election, and Deeds won her seat in a special election on December 18. This created a vacancy in Shuler's old district, so he moved back to Blacksburg and won a 12th district special election on January 8, 2002. On the next day, when the House opened its new session, Shuler returned without an actual break in service.

| Date | Election | Candidate | Party | Votes | % |
Virginia House of Delegates, 12th district
| November 2, 1993 | General | James Marshall Shuler | Democratic | 8,627 | 56.73 |
| November 2, 1993 | General | Larry N. Rush | Republican | 6,579 | 43.26 |
| November 2, 1993 | General | Write Ins | | 2 | 0.01 |
| November 2, 1993 | General | Joan Munford retired; seat stayed Democratic. | | | |
| November 7, 1995 | General | J M Shuler | Democratic | 8,778 | 60.31 |
| November 7, 1995 | General | L J Linkous | Republican | 5,776 | 39.68 |
| November 7, 1995 | General | Write Ins | | 1 | 0.01 |
| November 4, 1997 | General | James M. Shuler | Democratic | 10,151 | 99.78 |
| November 4, 1997 | General | Write Ins | | 22 | 0.22 |
| November 2, 1999 | General | J M Shuler | Democratic | 9,202 | 81.38 |
| November 2, 1999 | General | F M Baker | | 2,100 | 18.57 |
| November 2, 1999 | General | Write Ins | | 5 | 0.04 |
Virginia House of Delegates, 7th district
| November 6, 2001 | General | D A Nutter | Republican | 8,603 | 52.38 |
| November 6, 2001 | General | J M Shuler | Democratic | 7,821 | 47.62 |
Virginia House of Delegates, 12th district
| January 8, 2002 | Special | J M Shuler | Democratic | 7,284 | 70.77 |
| January 8, 2002 | Special | L J Linkous | Republican | 3,006 | 29.21 |
| January 8, 2002 | Special | Write Ins | | 2 | 0.02 |
| January 8, 2002 | Special | Creigh Deeds was elected to the Senate; seat stayed Democratic | | | |
| November 4, 2003 | General | J M Shuler | Democratic | 9,867 | 99.89 |
| November 4, 2003 | General | Write Ins | | 11 | 0.11 |
| November 8, 2005 | General | J M Shuler | Democratic | 14,390 | 79.10 |
| November 8, 2005 | General | D T Kern | | 3,767 | 20.71 |
| November 8, 2005 | General | Write Ins | | 36 | 0.20 |
| November 6, 2007 | General | James M. Shuler | Democratic | 12,145 | 99.45 |
| November 6, 2007 | General | Write Ins | | 67 | 0.54 |
| November 3, 2009 | General | James M. Shuler | Democratic | 12,716 | 72.23 |
| November 3, 2009 | General | Paul M. Cornett | | 4,799 | 27.26 |
| November 3, 2009 | General | Write Ins | | 88 | 0.49 |
