= Chris Hurst (Virginia politician) =

American journalist and politician

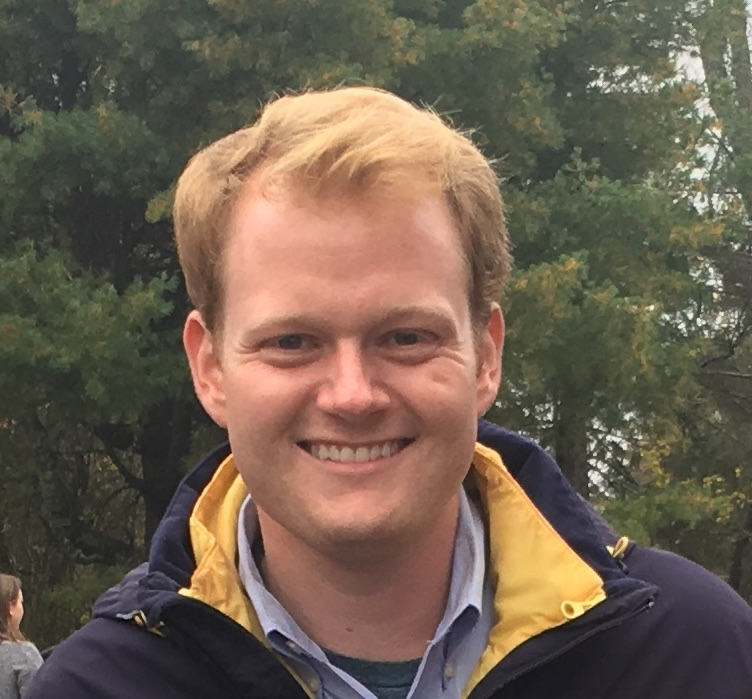

Member of the Virginia House of Delegates from the 12th district
- In office January 10, 2018 – January 12, 2022
- Preceded by: Joseph R. Yost
- Succeeded by: Jason Ballard

Personal details
- Born: Christopher Laird Hurst; July 9, 1987 (age 39) Philadelphia, Pennsylvania, U.S.
- Party: Democratic
- Education: Emerson College (BA)
- Occupation: Journalist, politician

Christopher Laird Hurst (born July 9, 1987) is an American journalist, former news anchor, and former member of the Virginia House of Delegates for the state's 12th district.

Hurst entered politics following the high-profile 2015 on-air murders of his fiancee, Alison Parker, and her co-worker, Adam Ward. He made gun control one of his top legislative priorities. In 2021, he was defeated for reelection by Jason Ballard.

In 2024, Hurst returned to TV news as a reporter for WTSP-TV in St. Petersburg, Florida. Writing about himself on his WTSP bio page, he mentioned that he returned to the air at WDBJ-TV soon after the shooting-deaths of his then-girlfriend Alison Parker and photographer Adam Ward, helping to guide the community through its collective grief and gaining recognition for his "admirable openness in the aftermath, including being named Roanoker of the Year by Roanoker Magazine."

== Personal life and education ==
Hurst was born in Philadelphia, Pennsylvania. He attended Emerson College from 2006 to 2009, earning a Bachelor of Arts degree in Broadcast Journalism.

== Career ==
Hurst began his career as a journalist for WDBJ in Roanoke, Virginia. He became an anchor for WDBJ at 22, which the station claimed made him the youngest anchor in the country.

Hurst entered politics in the aftermath of the 2015 on-air murder of his fiancee, Alison Parker.

In February 2017, he left his job and lived on his savings to run for the Virginia House of Delegates. In the race, Hurst was endorsed by Everytown for Gun Safety (the only House of Delegates candidate to receive the endorsement), while his opponent, incumbent Delegate Joseph R. Yost, had an "A" rating and endorsement from the NRA Political Victory Fund. Hurst also ran on LGBT rights, education, mental health, and Medicaid expansion.

Hurst defeated Yost in the November 2017 election, receiving 54.4% of the vote.

During his first legislative term, Hurst had 15 bills signed into law.

Hurst served as the Chair of the General Laws - Professions/Occupations and Administrative Process Subcommittee.

In 2018, the Virginia League of Conservation Voters presented Hurst with the 2018 Legislative Award. In 2019, Hurst introduced a bill to guarantee free speech protection to student journalists, but it failed a subcommittee vote. He won reelection in 2019, defeating Republican challenger Forrest Hite.

On January 26, 2020, Hurst was pulled over for a traffic stop; he was found to have a blood alcohol content (BAC) level of .085, which is over the legal limit, and was detained and released with a warning in Christiansburg, Virginia.

On November 1, 2021, Hurst was issued a notification by Radford police for driving without a license on November 1, 2021, after he and a passenger in his car were witnessed tampering with opponent campaign signs. He apologized for the incident, remarking that he "flipped over a couple of yard signs, took them, put them upside down and then put them right side up".

On November 2, 2021, Hurst lost his seat in the Virginia House of Delegates to his GOP opponent, Pearisburg City Councilman Jason Ballard, who carried 55.2% of the vote.

== Political positions ==
=== Environment ===
Hurst worked to delay the construction of the controversial Mountain Valley Pipeline to ensure the project adheres to safety and environmental regulations and has pushed for property rights protections.

=== Transportation ===
He worked with the Northam administration and colleagues across the aisle to pass a transportation package that would fund improvements for Interstate 81.

=== ABC laws in dry localities ===
Hurst helped pass a law that will flip Virginia's remaining “dry” localities to “wet.” He said the law will help businesses that want to sell liquor by the drink avoid the tedious process of getting permission from the legislature to do so, and that it will contribute to economic growth.

== Electoral history ==
Date	Election	Candidate	Party	Votes	%
Virginia House of Delegates, Radford, Giles, Montgomery, Pulaski district
Virginia House of Delegates, 12th district
November 7, 2017	General	Joseph R. Yost	Republican	10,458	45.5
November 7, 2017	General	Chris Hurst	Democratic	12,495	54.4
November 7, 2017	General	Write Ins		36	0.2
November 5, 2019	General	Chris Hurst	Democratic	11,113	53.56
November 5, 2019	General	Forrest Hite	Republican	9,642	46.39
November 5, 2019	General	Write Ins		11	0.05
November 2, 2021	General	Chris Hurst	Democratic	11,148	44.44
November 2, 2021	General	Jason Ballard	Republican	13,849	55.21
November 2, 2021	General	Write Ins		88	0.35
