= Dave Nutter =

American politician (born 1955)

David A. Nutter

Member of the Virginia House of Delegates from the 7th district
- In office January 2002 – January 2012
- Preceded by: Jim Shuler
- Succeeded by: Nick Rush

Personal details
- Born: April 2, 1955 (age 71) Clarksburg, West Virginia, U.S.
- Party: Republican
- Spouse: Jackie Gale Sheffield
- Children: 3
- Education: Virginia Tech
- Occupation: College administrator
- Committees: Health, Welfare and Institutions; Militia, Police and Public Safety; Science and Technology
- Website: www.davenutter.com

David A. Nutter (born April 2, 1955 in Clarksburg, West Virginia) is an American politician of the Republican Party. From 2002 to 2012, he served as a member of the Virginia House of Delegates. He represented the 7th district in the southwest part of the state, including the city of Radford and parts of Montgomery and Pulaski Counties. In 2011, Nutter decided to forgo a re-election campaign for his House seat and unsuccessfully challenged State Senator John S. Edwards in the 21st district. In 2012, Governor Bob McDonnell appointed Nutter to serve on the State Board of Community Colleges.
