= Murders of Alison Parker and Adam Ward =

2015 shooting in Moneta, Virginia, U.S.

- Location: 37.14330°N 79.67027°W; Bridgewater Plaza; Moneta, Virginia, U.S.
- Date: August 26, 2015: Shooting: 6:46 a.m.; Manhunt: 6:47 a.m. – c. 11:30 a.m.; (EDT)
- Target: Alison Parker and Adam Ward
- Attack type: Shooting; murder–suicide; double murder
- Weapon: 9mm Glock 19 semi-automatic pistol
- Deaths: 3 (including the perpetrator)
- Injuries: 1
- Perpetrator: Vester Lee Flanagan II (aka Bryce Williams)
- Motive: Perceived workplace animosity and racial prejudice, supposed revenge for the Charleston church shooting

On the morning of August 26, 2015, news reporter Alison Parker and photojournalist Adam Ward, both employees of CBS affiliate WDBJ in Roanoke, Virginia, United States, were fatally shot while conducting a live television interview near Smith Mountain Lake in Moneta. They were interviewing Vicki Gardner, executive director of the local chamber of commerce, when all three were attacked by a gunman in a shooting. Parker, age 24, and Ward, age 27, died at the scene, while Gardner survived.

The gunman was 41-year-old Vester Lee Flanagan II, a former reporter at WDBJ who had been fired in 2013 for disruptive conduct. After a five-hour manhunt, Flanagan shot himself in the head during a car chase with police officers and later died at a hospital.

== Events ==
=== Murders ===
At the time of the shooting, Alison Parker and Adam Ward were conducting a live interview with Vicki Gardner at Moneta's Bridgewater Plaza about upcoming events for the 50th anniversary of Smith Mountain Lake, 26 miles (42 km) southeast of Roanoke. The shooting occurred at 6:46 a.m. EDT in the middle of the segment, which was broadcast on WDBJ's morning news program Mornin'. Video of the incident showed Parker conducting the interview when at least eight gunshots were heard, followed by screams. Ward's camera fell to the ground, briefly capturing the image of Flanagan holding a Glock 19 9mm pistol.

WDBJ then switched back to Mornin' anchor Kimberly McBroom at the station's news studio, seemingly surprised, confused and unsure of how to react to what had just happened. She later stated that she believed the noises could have been a car backfiring or shots being fired in the background.

=== Immediate aftermath ===
Parker and Ward died at the scene. Gardner was also shot, but she survived following surgery at Carilion Roanoke Memorial Hospital. According to the state medical examiner's office, Parker died from gunshot wounds to her head and chest, while Ward died from shots to his head and torso. Gardner was shot in the back after she curled into a fetal position in an attempt to play dead. A total of fifteen shots were fired.

Staff in the WDBJ newsroom reviewed video of the incident from Ward's fallen camera and identified Flanagan as the likely gunman. They alerted general manager Jeffrey Marks, who passed the information to the Franklin County sheriff. Flanagan sent a fax to ABC News at 8:23 a.m. and then phoned shortly after 10:00 a.m., making a confession. During the ensuing manhunt, authorities tracked Flanagan's cell phone to locate him.

Flanagan abandoned his Ford Mustang at the Roanoke–Blacksburg Regional Airport and drove a rented Chevrolet Sonic north on I-81, then east on I-66. An automated license plate reader in a Virginia state trooper's car identified the rented Sonic at 11:20 a.m. The trooper called for backup and attempted to initiate a traffic stop, but Flanagan sped away. His car ran off the side of the road and struck an embankment near Markham after a pursuit of less than two miles. Flanagan was found inside the car with gunshot wounds to the head, which were apparently self-inflicted while he was driving. He was airlifted to Inova Fairfax Hospital in Falls Church, where he was declared dead at 1:26 p.m.

== Victims ==
Alison Bailey Parker (August 19, 1991 – August 26, 2015) grew up in Martinsville, Virginia, and attended Patrick & Henry Community College and James Madison University (JMU). She interned at WDBJ in 2012, worked as a general assignment news reporter at ABC affiliate WCTI-TV in New Bern, North Carolina, from December 2012 until May 2014, and then was hired by WDBJ in 2014 as a correspondent for Mornin'.

Adam Laing Ward (May 10, 1988 – August 26, 2015) was born in Daleville, Virginia. He grew up in Salem and graduated from Virginia Tech with a degree in communications and media studies in 2011. He had worked at the station since July 2011 as a videographer, as well as an occasional sports reporter.

Vicki Gardner is originally from Union Springs, New York, and had been the executive director of the Smith Mountain Lake Regional Chamber of Commerce from 2002 until 2019. She underwent surgery in which her right kidney and part of her colon were removed and was released from the hospital on September 8, 2015.

== Perpetrator ==
Vester Lee Flanagan II (October 8, 1973 – August 26, 2015) was known by the professional name Bryce Williams and was a native of Oakland, California. He graduated from Skyline High School and attended San Francisco State University, earning a degree in radio and television in 1995. He interned at CBS affiliate KPIX-TV in San Francisco in 1993, eventually working there as a production assistant and weekend news writer. He had also been an amateur actor and model before beginning his career in journalism. Flanagan first worked as a general assignment news reporter at CBS affiliate WTOC-TV in Savannah, Georgia, from February 1997 to March 1999.

Between March 1999 and March 2000 he worked as a reporter for NBC affiliate WTWC-TV in Tallahassee, Florida, where he reported to news director Don Shafer that co-workers were making offensive comments about his sexual orientation. In an interview with The Daily Mail, former WTWC sports reporter Dave Leval claimed that Flanagan verbally abused two women staffers at the station on different occasions after they pointed out mistakes in his reporting, and that several photographers had tried to get out of working on stories to which Flanagan was assigned due to his "diva" behavior. Flanagan lost his job due to "odd behavior" in March 2000. He filed a civil lawsuit against WTWC alleging racial discrimination, as he was African-American. The lawsuit was settled under unspecified terms in January 2001. WTWC's owner, Sinclair Broadcast Group, had shut down all the station's news operations in November 2000 due to poor ratings and budget reductions.

Flanagan worked for CBS affiliate WNCT-TV in Greenville, North Carolina, from 2002 to 2004. He also found some work at ABC affiliate KMID in Midland, Texas from 1995.

=== Tenure at WDBJ ===
WDBJ announced on April 19, 2012, that they hired Flanagan as a multimedia journalist under the professional name Bryce Williams. Documents relating to his time at WDBJ suggest that the station's management considered him an experienced reporter, but there were conflicts with other reporters and with photographers. Office memos from WDBJ showed that news director Dan Dennison ordered Flanagan to contact Health Advocate in July 2012 after receiving complaints that co-workers were "feeling threatened or uncomfortable" while working with him. It is unclear whether he did so prior to his dismissal.

WDBJ dismissed Flanagan on February 1, 2013, citing his volatile behavior. According to a former colleague, upon learning of his dismissal, Flanagan lashed out at newsroom staffers, resulting in the staffers being put in a room while police escorted him out of the building. Ward allegedly recorded Flanagan as he was escorted out, and the two men had a confrontation earlier that day. Flanagan allegedly threw a wooden cross at Dennison, saying, "You need this".

WDBJ provided security to the staffers for a time after the incident and directed them to call the police if he ever returned to the station. Flanagan filed a complaint with the Equal Employment Opportunity Commission (EEOC) against WDBJ, alleging racial discrimination, in which he allegedly named Parker. The EEOC investigated, then dismissed the complaint as uncorroborated.

Flanagan got a job at a local UnitedHealth Group call center after his dismissal. He had a confrontation with a woman employee who casually pointed out how quiet he was being, to which he responded aggressively, telling her to never talk to him again. One of Flanagan's neighbors in his apartment complex described him as an arrogant person who acted rudely towards people around him. He was noted for sometimes throwing cat feces at the homes of neighbors with whom he had disputes.

=== Shooting and motives ===
Flanagan maintained accounts on Facebook and Twitter that were suspended after he was named as a suspect in the shooting. He repeated his claims of racial discrimination by WDBJ on both profiles, specifically naming Parker and Ward. He claimed that Parker had made a coded racist remark during her internship at WDBJ regarding a friend of Flanagan's, and that Ward had filed a complaint against him to the station's human resources department after working with him on one occasion. In Flanagan's suicide note he wrote that he had killed both of his cats out of rage after his firing.

At 11:14 a.m. on the day of the shooting, Flanagan uploaded a 56-second cellphone camera video to his Twitter and Facebook accounts before they were suspended, shot from a first-person perspective of the incident. The video shows Flanagan walking up to the scene of the interview and brandishing a handgun for approximately 15 seconds without Ward, Parker, or Gardner noticing; Gardner later said that she had been blinded by the television lighting. Flanagan mutters "bitch" while pointing the weapon at Parker, and lowers the gun before raising it again and opening fire directly at her. Parker flinches and screams before attempting to escape the attack, and the light of Ward's camera is seen quickly dropping before Flanagan pulls away the camera and shuts it off.

ABC News received a 23-page fax at 8:26 a.m. allegedly sent by Flanagan titled, "Suicide Note for Friend & Family". In the document, Flanagan described his grievances over what he alleged to be racial discrimination and sexual harassment committed by black men and white women in his workplace, believing that he was targeted because he was a homosexual black man. He claimed to have been provoked by the Charleston church shooting, two months before, and made threatening comments about Dylann Roof, who perpetrated the shooting. Flanagan described the church shooting as a "tipping point", saying that his anger had been "building steadily" and describing himself as "a human powder keg ... just waiting to go BOOM". A spokesman for the Franklin County Sheriff's Office said that Flanagan "very closely identified" with "individuals who have committed domestic acts of violence and mass murder, as well as the September 11, 2001, attacks on the U.S." Flanagan said that Jehovah had told him to act and expressed an admiration for Eric Harris and Dylan Klebold, who perpetrated the 1999 Columbine High School massacre, and for Seung-Hui Cho, the perpetrator of the 2007 Virginia Tech shooting. Flanagan said in the note, "Yeah I'm all fucked up in the head."

After Flanagan's death, officers searched his rental car. They found various items, including a Glock pistol with several magazines and ammunition, a cell phone, letters, notes, a "to-do" list, a suitcase containing three license plates, and several disguises, including a wig.

== Aftermath ==
=== Responses ===
U.S. President Barack Obama said he was heartbroken over the murders. Virginia Governor Terry McAuliffe said on Twitter that he also was heartbroken over the shooting, and he reasserted his support for gun control. McAuliffe later made calls for tougher gun laws in the state and blamed the Virginia General Assembly for failing to pass a package of gun control measures that he had proposed earlier in January. His remarks drew criticism from Republicans who charged that he was politicizing the tragedy. Senator Mark Warner of Virginia gave his condolences to Parker and Ward's families, as well as to WDBJ and the first responders involved.

Parker's father, Andy Parker, said that he would become an advocate on the issue of gun violence prevention, comparing it to John Walsh's advocacy of crime prevention. He said that he would speak with politicians and news outlets to address mental health issues and improve care for those with mental illnesses. He had run as a Democratic candidate for the Virginia House of Delegates in 2007. However, he was not elected, and he urged politicians to strengthen laws against gun violence. Andy Parker's comments were made against pressure from the National Rifle Association (NRA), whom he criticized for preventing lawmakers from passing such legislation in the past. He criticized Senators Mark Warner and Tim Kaine, the latter of whom criticized the NRA for obstructing efforts by the General Assembly and Congress to tighten background checks for gun purchases, for not directly contacting his family following the announcement that his daughter was one of the victims. Staff members for Senator Kaine explained that he had not contacted the victims' families at the time "out of respect for their space and privacy during this difficult time of grieving". The same reasoning was cited by Warner on August 29, who said he did not immediately contact Parker's family out of respect to the family's privacy "at a time of unimaginable grief".

The shooting led Alison Parker's boyfriend, Chris Hurst, to successfully run for a seat in the House of Delegates with a priority to pass gun control legislation.

=== Media response ===
==== Delayed releases ====
In the immediate wake of the shooting, various media productions were either delayed or pulled from television outlets. USA Network postponed the first-season finale of the series Mr. Robot one week from its originally scheduled air date (the day of the murders) because the episode included a scene with similarities to the incident.

IFC delayed broadcasting an episode of its satirical series Documentary Now! which involved two journalists who are killed on-camera as they track down a Mexican drug cartel leader. Warner Bros. Records decided to pull a television commercial for Disturbed's album Immortalized, as it depicted an incident similar to the killings.

==== Use of the murderer's video ====
Writing about news coverage of the incident, ThinkProgress noted, "There isn't broad consensus about how to handle this type of coverage." Users of Facebook and Twitter criticized the sites' autoplay option, which allowed opted-in viewers to see graphic images of the shooting without warning. The New York Post, New York's Daily News, and British tabloids The Sun and The Daily Mirror were criticized for their decision to publish still frames from Flanagan's phone video of the murders on their front pages. ABC World News Tonight did not show any part of Flanagan's video; NBC Nightly News broadcast a still frame; and CBS Evening News showed a 25-second segment of the video.

On the day of the shooting, CNN repeatedly aired the footage on an hourly basis. The gun control lobbying group Everytown for Gun Safety shared the broadcast video with a three-second discretionary warning. WDBJ pleaded on Twitter for people to not "share or post the video".

==== Viewer harm ====
Christine Courtois, chairwoman of the American Psychological Association's post-traumatic stress disorder guidelines development panel, warned that anyone watching the footage was likely to be upset, possibly resulting in acute stress disorder. The Guardian journalist Catherine Bennett criticized the media's use of frame shots and footage as "helping Flanagan achieve his vanity script".

Ebony writer Jamilah Lemieux and Dexter Thomas of the Los Angeles Times wrote that the American mainstream media were too selective about rebroadcasting the footage of Parker and Ward's deaths to white audiences, but have frequently shown content of many black people being killed. Los Angeles Times writer Mary McNamara wrote that reluctance to watch or share the graphic footage in order to prevent the fulfillment of "a killer's wish is not just absurd, it's agreeing to adopt a murderer's way of thinking". She said that people should watch the footage, not for entertainment, but to realize how brutal the murders were. New York Daily News writer Linda Stasi said that media criticism of showing footage contradicted frequent media decisions to publish other violent content.

==== Police censorship ====
The Virginia State Police ordered BBC journalists to delete the station's copy of the video of Flanagan crashing his car during the police chase, before he committed suicide.

==== Analyst comments ====
Attorney and legal analyst Philip A. Holloway argued that employers and HR personnel need to recognize they are "putting lives at risk" when they fail to warn subsequent employers about the dangerous behavior of their former employees.

=== Battling online material ===
In sworn testimony before Congress in July 2019, Andy Parker credited the HONR Network in assisting him to combat offensive online material and hoaxes spread after the tragedy, saying:

the HONR Network who worked long hours flagging videos so that I was spared. When finding offensive content, HONR volunteers would click the report button below each video and check the appropriate box explaining how the video violates YouTube's Community guidelines. Although hundreds of videos have been taken down due to their diligence, they are often stymied, even with an enforceable copyright.

He also added:

I have engaged in direct communications with Google regarding the proliferation of these videos, but while they profess a desire to help, in reality they do nothing ... [I met with] Google Director of Global Human Rights regarding specific content and our attempts to have it removed. Their response was, 'We're really trying'. Since that meeting, there has been nothing but silence. Thanks to Section 230, Google has complete immunity and therefore no incentive to respond.

On February 20, 2020, Andy Parker filed a complaint to the Federal Trade Commission alleging that YouTube had failed to enforce its own Terms of Service by keeping certain videos of the shooting on its website. In October 2021, Parker filed a similar complaint to the FTC about Facebook. In February 2022, it was reported that Parker had created a non-fungible token from the video material recorded by Ward's camera in an attempt to claim copyright as a means of pressuring social media platforms to remove the video.

=== Lawsuit against WDBJ ===
In 2017, Vicki Gardner filed a $6 million civil suit against WDBJ for being "negligent in hiring Flanagan". On June 26, 2020, a Franklin County Circuit Court dismissed the case.

=== Memorials ===
After the murders, Patrick Henry Community College and the PHCC Foundation created the Alison Bailey Parker Memorial Scholarship to remember Parker, who graduated from the college in 2009. The scholarship is awarded annually to a student studying in a Media Design and Production program. In 2017, JMU dedicated a soundstage and control room in Harrison Hall to Parker, naming it the Alison B. Parker studio. JMU's Media Arts & Design School also established the Alison B. Parker Memorial Fund in her honor.

The Salem Educational Foundation and Alumni Association established the Adam Ward Scholarship fund to remember Ward. He had previously attended Salem High School where his father, Buddy, had also worked as a guidance counselor.

== See also ==
- Capital Gazette shooting
- Crime in Virginia
- R. Budd Dwyer, the former state treasurer of Pennsylvania whose suicide during a press conference was televised in 1987
- List of journalists killed in the United States
- Suicide of Christine Chubbuck, Chubbuck was a television news reporter and the first person to commit suicide on live television, in 1974
- Workplace aggression
