= Jimmie Massie =

American politician (1958–2023)

Member of the Virginia House of Delegates from the 72nd district
- In office January 9, 2008 – January 10, 2018
- Preceded by: Jack Reid
- Succeeded by: Schuyler VanValkenburg

Personal details
- Born: James Pleasants Massie III; May 3, 1958 Norfolk, Virginia, U.S.
- Died: January 25, 2023 (aged 64)
- Party: Republican
- Spouse: Elizabeth Wallis
- Children: James IV, William, Rebecca, John
- Education: University of Virginia
- Occupation: Investor
- Website: www.jimmiemassie.com

James Pleasants Massie III (May 3, 1958 – January 25, 2023) was an American politician of the Republican Party. From 2008 to 2018, he was a member of the Virginia House of Delegates. He represented the 72nd district in Henrico County.
