= Prince William County, Virginia Clerk of Circuit Court =

Elected office in Virginia

Prince William County Clerk of Circuit Court is an elected office in Prince William County, Virginia that dates back to the 1700s. The clerk serves an eight-year term, earns $162,740 a year, and has more than 800 responsibilities listed in the Code of Virginia.

In 2017, Jacqueline Smith and Virginia's 50th House of Delegates district delegate Jackson Miller ran in a special election for the office, to complete the term that ends in 2023. The election was won by Smith.
