= Bobby Orrock =

American politician (born 1955)

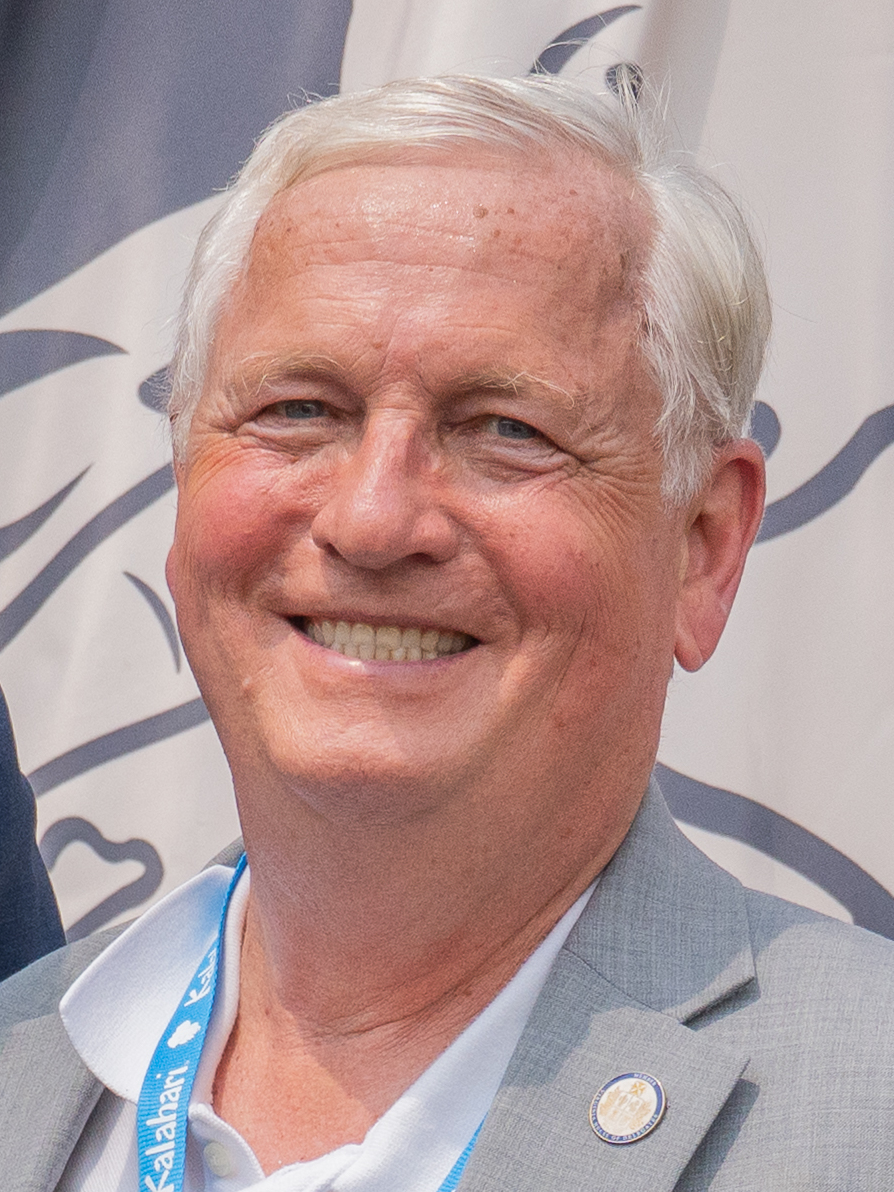
- Orrock in 2025

Member of the Virginia House of Delegates
- In office January 10, 1990 – January 14, 2026
- Preceded by: Robert W. Ackerman
- Succeeded by: Nicole Cole
- Constituency: 54th district (1990–2024); 66th district (2024–2026)

Personal details
- Born: Robert Dickson Orrock; November 13, 1955 (age 70) Fredericksburg, Virginia, U.S.
- Party: Republican
- Spouses: Betsy Malinda Massey (died 2001); Debra Shelton
- Children: 3
- Education: Virginia Tech (BS); Virginia State University (MEd)
- Profession: High school agriculture education teacher
- Committees: Health, Welfare and Institutions (chair); Agriculture, Chesapeake and Natural Resources; Finance; Rules
- Website: www.bobbyorrock.net

Robert Dickson Orrock Sr. (born November 13, 1955) is an American politician. From 1990 until 2026, he was a member of the Virginia House of Delegates, representing the 66th district in the east-central part of the state, including (since 2002) parts of Caroline and Spotsylvania counties; the former county is included in the Greater Richmond Region and the latter county is included in the Washington metropolitan area. From 1990–1991, the District encompassed all of Spotsylvania County, part of Caroline County, and part of the Fredericksburg City. From 1992–2001, the District encompassed part of Spotsylvania County and all of Fredericksburg City. He is a member of the Republican Party. Orrock was defeated by Democrat Nicole Cole in the 2025 Virginia House of Delegates election.

== Early life and education ==
Orrock was born in Fredericksburg, Virginia. He attended Ladysmith High School in Caroline County, graduating in 1974. After one year at Germanna Community College, he transferred to Virginia Tech, receiving a B.S. degree in agriculture education in 1978. He received an M.Ed. degree in the same subject from Virginia State University in 1988.

== Career ==
Orrock is a semi-retired teacher of agricultural education at Spotsylvania High School. In 2017, the widower remarried to Debra Orrock, née Shelton. Since 1973, Delegate Orrock has served on the Ladysmith, Virginia Volunteer Rescue Squad and has since gone on to become a trustee of both the Ladysmith and Spotsylvania County, Virginia Volunteer Rescue Squad. Orrock is also a certified hunter safety instructor with the Virginia Department of Game and Inland Fisheries. He is also a longtime part-time emcee of a Sunday morning radio gospel show on WFLS-FM broadcasting from Fredericksburg, Virginia.

== Positions and appointments ==
Orrock served as the Co-Chairman of the Agriculture Committee (2000–2001) and has been the Chairman of the Health, Welfare, and Institutions Committee continually since 2010.

He has served as a member on the following committees since joining the House of Delegates:

- Agriculture (1990–1993 and 1995–2001)
- Chesapeake and Its Tributaries (1990–1994)
- Agriculture, Chesapeake, and Natural Resources (2002–)
- Health, Welfare, and Institutions (1990–2003 and 2006–)
- Counties, Cities, and Towns (1994–2009)
- Finance (1998–2005 and 2010–)
- Mining and Mineral Resources (2000–2001)
- Rules (2012–)

== Electoral history ==
| Date | Election | Candidate | Party | Votes | % |
Virginia House of Delegates, 54th district
| November 7, 1989 | General | Robert Dickson Orrock Sr. | Republican | 10,383 | 54.50 |
| November 7, 1989 | General | Robert W. Ackerman | Democratic | 8,665 | 45.49 |
| November 7, 1989 | General | Write Ins | | 2 | 0.01 |
| November 7, 1989 | General | Incumbent lost; seat switched from Democratic to Republican | | | |
| November 5, 1991 | General | Robert Dickson Orrock Sr. | Republican | 8,071 | 56.22 |
| November 5, 1991 | General | Layton R. Fairchild Jr. | Democratic | 6,286 | 43.78 |
| November 2, 1993 | General | Robert Dickson Orrock Sr. | Republican | 11,397 | 68.85 |
| November 2, 1993 | General | James B. Smith | Democratic | 5,149 | 31.11 |
| November 2, 1993 | General | Write Ins | | 7 | 0.04 |
| November 7, 1995 | General | R D Orrock | Republican | 13,153 | 82.30 |
| November 7, 1995 | General | S L Shelton | Independent | 2,828 | 17.69 |
| November 7, 1995 | General | Write Ins | | 1 | 0.01 |
| November 4, 1997 | General | Robert D. "Bobby" Orrock | Republican | 14,948 | 99.59 |
| November 4, 1997 | General | Write Ins | | 61 | 0.41 |
| November 2, 1999 | General | R D Orrock | Republican | 13,006 | 99.30 |
| November 2, 1999 | General | Write Ins | | 92 | 0.70 |
| November 6, 2001 | General | R D Orrock | Republican | 13,930 | 98.11 |
| November 6, 2001 | General | Write Ins | | 268 | 1.89 |
| November 4, 2003 | General | R D Orrock | Republican | 10,745 | 98.33 |
| November 4, 2003 | General | Write Ins | | 183 | 1.67 |
| June 14, 2005 | Republican primary | Robert D. "Bobby" Orrock | | 2,009 | 55.3 |
| June 14, 2005 | Republican primary | Shaun V Kenney | | 1,626 | 44.7 |
| November 8, 2005 | General | R D Orrock | Republican | 15,549 | 96.33 |
| November 8, 2005 | General | Write Ins | | 592 | 3.67 |
| November 6, 2007 | General | R. D. "Bobby" Orrock | Republican | 11,451 | 73.70 |
| November 6, 2007 | General | Kimbra L. Kincheloe | Independent | 4,067 | 26.17 |
| November 6, 2007 | General | Write Ins | | 18 | 0.11 |
| November 3, 2009 | General | Robert D. "Bobby" Orrock | Republican | 17,560 | 97.93 |
| November 3, 2009 | General | Write Ins | | 371 | 2.06 |
| November 8, 2011 | General | Robert D. "Bobby" Orrock | Republican | 11,338 | 73.15 |
| November 8, 2011 | General | Matthew D. Simpson | Independent | 3,874 | 24.99 |
| November 8, 2011 | General | Write Ins | | 286 | 1.84 |
| June 11, 2013 | Republican primary | Robert D. "Bobby" Orrock | | 1,277 | 56.03 |
| June 11, 2013 | Republican primary | Dustin R. Curtis | | 1,002 | 43.97 |
| November 7, 2013 | General | Robert D. "Bobby" Orrock | Republican | 15,649 | 90.6 |
| November 7, 2013 | General | Write Ins | | 1,625 | 9.4 |
| November 3, 2015 | General | Robert D. "Bobby" Orrock | Republican | 11,829 | 96.40 |
| November 3, 2015 | General | Write Ins | | 442 | 3.60 |
| June 13, 2017 | Republican primary | Robert D. "Bobby" Orrock | | 4,254 | 81.2 |
| June 13, 2017 | Republican primary | Nicholas Gregory Ignacio | | 987 | 18.8 |
| November 7, 2017 | General | Robert Dickson Orrock Sr. | Republican | 13,782 | 57.9 |
| November 7, 2017 | General | Alfred Durante | Democratic | 9,982 | 41.9 |
| November 7, 2017 | General | Write Ins | | 50 | 0.2 |
| November 5, 2019 | General | Robert Dickson Orrock Sr. | Republican | 13,614 | 57.9 |
| November 5, 2019 | General | Neri Neftali Canahui-Ortiz | Democratic | 9,852 | 41.9 |
| November 5, 2019 | General | Write Ins | | 27 | 0.2 |
| November 2, 2021 | General | Robert Dickson Orrock Sr. | Republican | 21,231 | 60.9 |
| November 2, 2021 | General | Eric Matthew Butterworth | Democratic | 13,616 | 39.0 |
| November 2, 2021 | General | Write Ins | | 42 | 0.1 |
| November 7, 2023 | General | Robert Dickson Orrock Sr. | Republican | 13,592 | 55.61 |
| November 7, 2023 | General | Eric Matthew Butterworth | Democratic | 10,786 | 44.13 |
| November 7, 2023 | General | Write Ins | | 65 | 0.27 |
| November 4, 2025 | General | Robert Dickson Orrock Sr. | Republican | 16,939 | 47 |
| November 4, 2025 | General | Nicole Cole | Democratic | 18,503 | 52 |
| November 4, 2025 | General | Write Ins | | 65 | 0.27 |
