= Virginia's 54th House of Delegates district =

Virginia legislative district

District map from the 2023 election

Virginia's 54th House of Delegates district elects one of 100 seats in the Virginia House of Delegates, the lower house of the state's bicameral legislature. District 54, in Spotsylvania County and Caroline County, Virginia, has been represented by Republican Bobby Orrock since 1990.

== 2017 election ==
In 2017, Orrock ran against gun rights activist Nick Ignacio in the Republican primary and Democrat Al Durante, a retired teacher who chairs the Spotsylvania Democratic Committee, in the general election.

== Electoral history ==
2011 General Election, Virginia's 54th House of Delegates district
Party	Candidate	Votes	%	±%
Republican	Bobby Orrock	11,338	73.16	n/a
Independent	Matthew Simpson	3,874	25.00	n/a
Total votes		15,212	100.00	n/a

2012 General Election, United States Senate
Party	Candidate	Votes	%	±%
Republican	George Allen	17,589	52.63%	n/a
Democratic	Tim Kaine	15,769	47.18%	n/a
Total votes		33,358	100.00	n/a

2012 General Election, Presidential
Party	Candidate	Votes	%	±%
Republican	Mitt Romney	17,860	52.73%	n/a
Democratic	Barack Obama	15,477	45.70%	n/a
Libertarian	Gary Johnson	291	0.86%	n/a
Constitution	Virgil Goode	98	0.29%	n/a
Green	Jill Stein	74	0.22%	n/a
Total votes		33,773	100.00	n/a

2013 General Election, Virginia Attorney General
Party	Candidate	Votes	%	±%
Republican	Mark Obenshain	10,732	56.16%	n/a
Democratic	Mark Herring	8,376	43.83%	n/a
Total votes		19,108	100.00	n/a

2013 General Election, Virginia Lt. Governor
Party	Candidate	Votes	%	±%
Republican	E. W. Jackson	10,195	53.31%	n/a
Democratic	Ralph Northam	8,881	46.44%	n/a
Total votes		19,076	100.00	n/a

2013 General Election, Virginia Governor
Party	Candidate	Votes	%	±%
Republican	Ken Cuccinelli	10,380	53.60%	n/a
Democratic	Terry McAuliffe	7,915	40.87%	n/a
Libertarian	Robert Sarvis	1,018	5.26%	n/a
Total votes		19,313	100.00	n/a

2013 Republican Primary, Virginia 54th House of Delegates
Party	Candidate	Votes	%	±%
Republican	Bobby Orrock	1,277	56.03%	n/a
Republican	Dustin Curtis	1,002	43.97%	n/a
Total votes		2,279	100.00	n/a

2013 General Election, Virginia 54th House of Delegates
Party	Candidate	Votes	%	±%
Republican	Bobby Orrock	15,649	90.59%	n/a
Total votes		15,649	90.59%	n/a

2014 General Election, United States Senate
Party	Candidate	Votes	%	±%
Republican	Ed Gillespie	11,308	56.94%	n/a
Democratic	Mark Warner	8,094	40.76%	n/a
Libertarian	Robert Sarvis	438	2.21%	n/a
Total votes		19,840	100.00%	n/a

2015 General Election, Virginia 54th House of Delegates
Party	Candidate	Votes	%	±%
Republican	Bobby Orrock	11,892	100.00%	n/a
Total votes		11,892	100.00%	n/a

2016 General Election, Presidential
Party	Candidate	Votes	%	±%
Republican	Donald Trump	18,767	53.59%	n/a
Democratic	Hillary Clinton	14,293	40.81%	n/a
Libertarian	Gary Johnson	1,130	3.23%	n/a
Independent	Evan McMullin	555	1.58%	n/a
Green	Jill Stein	276	0.79%	n/a
Total votes		35,021	100.00%	n/a
