= Virginia's 21st House of Delegates district =

Virginia legislative district

Virginia's 21st State House of Delegates district
- District map from the 2023 election
Delegate
Josh Thomas; D–Gainesville
since January 10, 2024
- Demographics: 46% White; 13% Black; 24% Hispanic; 12% Asian; 5% Multiracial
- Population (2023) • Voting age: 85,827; 18
- Registered voters (2024): 58,142

Virginia's 21st House of Delegates district elects one of one hundred seats in the Virginia House of Delegates, the lower house of the state's bicameral legislature. District 21 consisted of Virginia Beach and Chesapeake until 2024, and after redistricting represents the area northwest of Manassas. It has been represented by Kelly Fowler since 2018.

== District officeholders ==
Years	Delegate	Party	Electoral history
January 2008 – January 13, 2010	Bobby Mathieson	Democratic	Defeated in bid for reelection
January 13, 2010 – January 10, 2018	Ron Villanueva	Republican	Defeated in bid for reelection
January 10, 2018 – 2024	Kelly Fowler	Democratic	First elected in 2017
