= Joseph R. Yost =

American politician (born 1986)

Member of the Virginia House of Delegates from the 12th district
- In office January 11, 2012 – January 10, 2018
- Preceded by: Jim Shuler
- Succeeded by: Chris Hurst

Personal details
- Born: June 9, 1986 (age 40) Pearisburg, Virginia, U.S.
- Party: Republican
- Education: Radford University (BS, MA)
- Occupation: Executive Director of the Giles County Historical Society

Joseph R. Yost (born June 9, 1986, in Pearisburg, Virginia) is an American politician. A Republican, he was elected to the Virginia House of Delegates in 2011. He represented the 12th district from 2012 to 2018. Yost was indicted for embezzlement charges in January 2022.

== Early life and education ==
After graduating from Giles High School in 2004, Yost received a B.S. degree from Radford University in 2006 and an M.A. in 2008, both in criminal justice.

== Career ==
Yost became active with the Montgomery County Republican Committee in 2009. He was elected chair of the Roanoke/New River Valley Young Republicans in 2011.

The 12th House district incumbent, Democrat Jim Shuler, did not run for re-election in 2011. Yost defeated Democratic candidate Don S. Langrehr in the general election, 8104–7582.

In the 2017 election, he lost in an upset to opponent Chris Hurst for his seat in the Virginia House of Delegates.

== Personal life ==
Yost married Lisa Michelle Robinson in June 2010 and have since divorced. They have one daughter together.
