= Virginia's 7th House of Delegates district =

State legislative district in Virginia, USA

Virginia's 7th State House of Delegates district
- District map from the 2023 election
Delegate
Karen Keys-Gamarra; D–Oakton
since January 10, 2024
- Demographics: 62% White; 7% Black; 14% Hispanic; 11% Asian; 1% Other; 5% Multiracial
- Population (2023) • Voting age: 85,604; 18
- Registered voters (2024): 69,095

Virginia's 7th House of Delegates district is one of 100 seats in the Virginia House of Delegates, the lower house of the state's bicameral legislature. District 7 covers portions of Fairfax County. The district is represented by Democrat Karen Keys-Gamarra.

== District officeholders ==
Years	Delegate	Party	Electoral history
January 12, 2000 – January 9, 2002	Benny Keister	Democratic	Redistricted to 6th district
January 2002 – January 11, 2012	Dave Nutter	Republican	Decline to run for reelection; Ran for state senate
January 11, 2012 – January 12, 2022	Nick Rush	Republican	First elected in 2012
January 12, 2022 – January 10, 2024	Marie March	Republican	First elected in 2021 (redistricted to District 47 and lost renomination)
January 10, 2024 – present	Karen Keys-Gamarra	Democratic	First elected in 2023

== Electoral history ==
2015 General Election, Virginia 7th House of Delegates
Party	Candidate	Votes	%	±%
Republican	Nick Rush	14,714	100.00%	n/a
Total votes		14,714	100.00%	n/a

2016 General Election, Presidential
Party	Candidate	Votes	%	±%
Republican	Donald Trump	22,190	63.39%	n/a
Democratic	Hillary Clinton	10,982	31.37%	n/a
Libertarian	Gary Johnson	1,065	3.04%	n/a
Independent	Evan McMullin	483	1.38%	n/a
Green	Jill Stein	285	0.81%	n/a
Total votes		35,005	100.00%	n/a

2017 General Election, Virginia 7th House of Delegates
Party	Candidate	Votes	%	±%
Democratic	Flourette Ketner	8,878	33.58%	+33.58%
Republican	Nick Rush	17,560	66.42%	−33.58%
Total votes		26,438	100.00%	
