= Will Davis (Virginia politician) =

American politician from Virginia

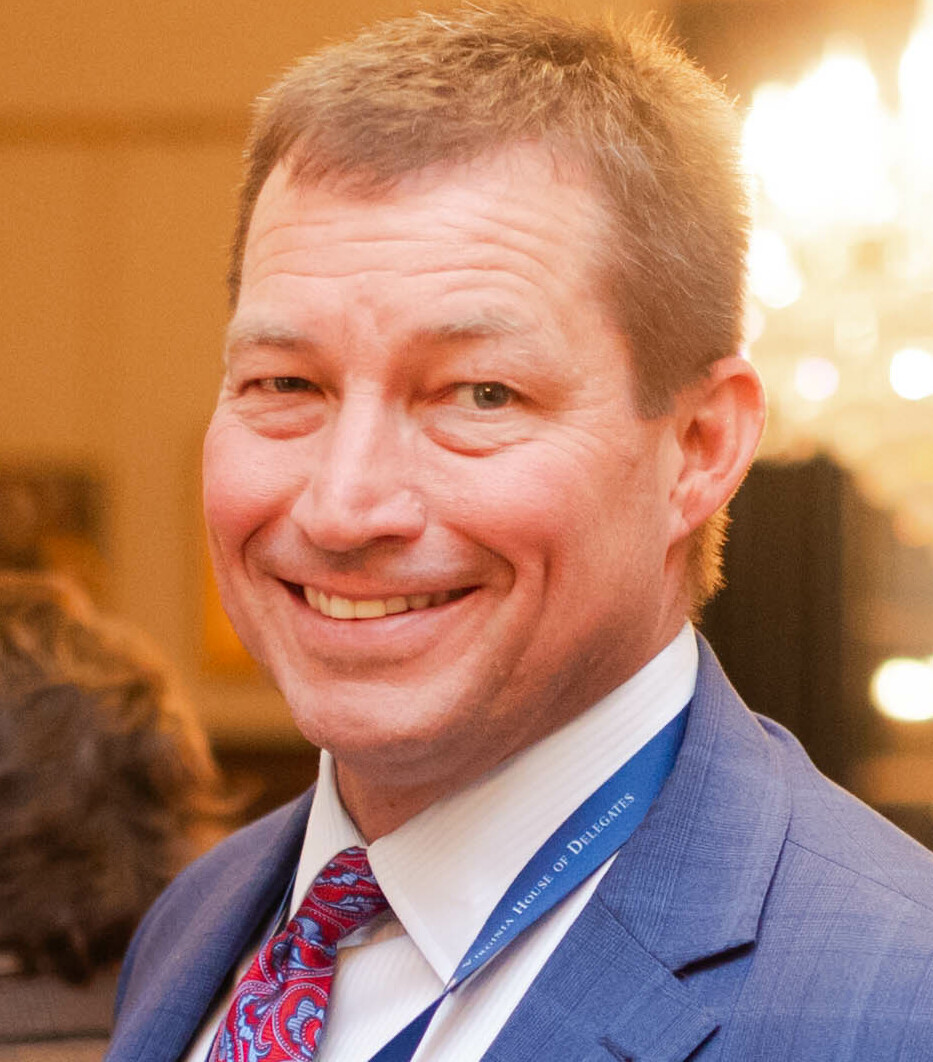
- Davis in 2024

Member of the Virginia House of Delegates from the 39th district
- Incumbent
- Assumed office January 10, 2024
- Preceded by: Vivian Watts (redistricting)

Personal details
- Party: Republican

Will Davis is an American Republican politician from Virginia. He was elected to the Virginia House of Delegates in the 2023 Virginia House of Delegates election from the 39th district.

== Early life and career ==
Davis was born in Roanoke, Virginia. He graduated from Bridgewater College and earned his Juris Doctor degree from Regent University. In 1999, Davis became the fourth generation to practice in his family law firm in Rocky Mount.

== Personal life ==
Davis is married to Caroline Cooper-Davis and they have two children.
