= 2023 Virginia House of Delegates election =

- November 7, 2023

All 100 seats in the Virginia House of Delegates (Note: Including six seats which were vacant before the election occurring.) 51 seats needed for a majority
- Turnout: 41% ▼13.9
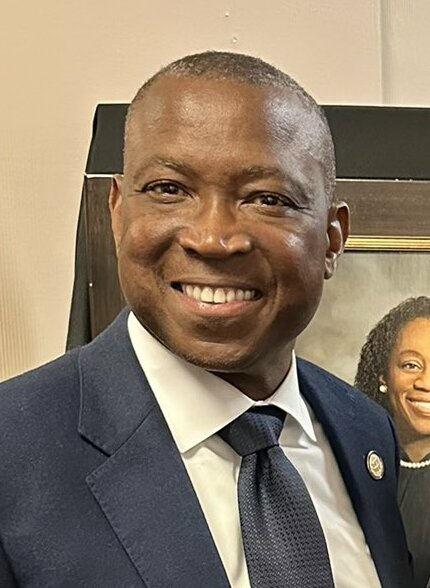

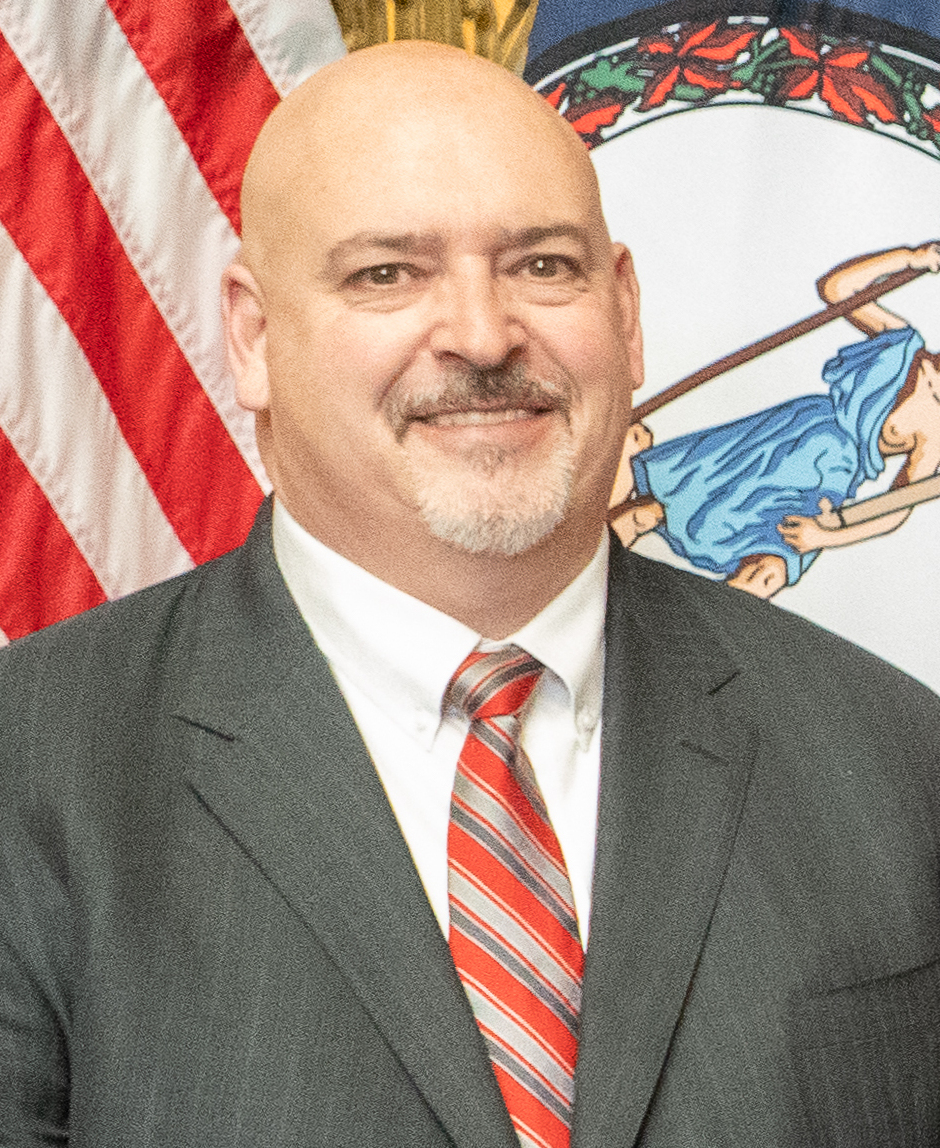
	Majority party	Minority party
Leader	Don Scott	Todd Gilbert
Party	Democratic	Republican
Leader since	June 1, 2022	January 8, 2020
Leader's seat	88th–Portsmouth	33rd–Woodstock
Last election	48	52
Seats won	51	49
Seat change	▲3	▼3
Popular vote	1,186,887	1,144,704
Percentage	49.50%	47.74%
Swing	▲1.96%	▼3.82%
- Democratic hold Democratic gain Republican hold Republican gain 50–60% 60–70% 70–80% 80–90% >90% 50–60% 60–70% 70–80% 80–90% >90%
Speaker before election
Todd Gilbert
Republican
Elected Speaker
Don Scott
Democratic

The 2023 Virginia House of Delegates election took place on November 7, 2023, concurrently with elections for the Virginia Senate, to elect members of the 163rd Virginia General Assembly. All 100 delegates were elected to two-year terms from single-member districts. Nomination primaries held through the Department of Elections were held on June 20, 2023. Democrats gained three seats, winning back control with a 51–49 majority after having previously lost it in 2021.

== Background ==
Following the 2021 election, Republicans regained control of the House of Delegates, which had been lost to the Democrats in 2019. They controlled a narrow majority of 52 seats prior to the 2023 election.

After the 2022 General Assembly session, House Democrats voted via a secret ballot to remove former speaker and then-minority leader Eileen Filler-Corn from the top of party leadership. House Democrats would replace Filler-Corn with Don Scott as the new minority leader.

The 2023 election was the first held under new district maps following redistricting as a result of the 2020 census. In 2020, voters overwhelmingly approved a constitutional amendment to create an independent redistricting committee. This committee ultimately failed to agree on a newly drawn map. The districts delegates ran in were created by two special masters appointed by the Supreme Court of Virginia.

Governor Glenn Youngkin sought a Republican trifecta, already having control of the House of Delegates after the 2021 election. However, this is the first state-level election in Virginia following the U.S. Supreme Court's Dobbs v. Jackson Women's Health Organization decision the previous year, which ruled that abortion is not a constitutional right in the United States. Youngkin attempted to change Republican messaging on abortion by proposing a 15-week abortion "limit" instead of using the word "ban".

== Retirements ==
25 incumbents did not seek re-election.

=== Republicans ===
Ten Republicans did not seek re-election.

1. District 4: Will Wampler retired.
2. District 17: Chris Head retired to successfully run for State Senate.
3. District 20: John Avoli retired.
4. District 27: Roxann Robinson retired.
5. District 28: Tara Durant retired to successfully run for State Senate.
6. District 33: Dave LaRock retired to run for State Senate.
7. District 56: John McGuire retired to successfully run for State Senate.
8. District 60: James E. Edmunds retired.
9. District 64: Emily Brewer retired to successfully run for State Senate.
10. District 99: Margaret Ransone retired.

=== Democrats ===
Fifteen Democrats did not seek re-election.

1. District 10: Wendy Gooditis retired.
2. District 13: Danica Roem retired to successfully run for State Senate.
3. District 31: Elizabeth Guzmán retired to run for State Senate.
4. District 34: Kathleen Murphy retired.
5. District 36: Ken Plum retired.
6. District 38: Kaye Kory retired.
7. District 41: Eileen Filler-Corn retired.
8. District 57: Sally L. Hudson retired to run for State Senate.
9. District 68: Dawn Adams retired.
10. District 71: Jeff Bourne retired.
11. District 72: Schuyler VanValkenburg retired to successfully run for State Senate.
12. District 76: Clint Jenkins retired to run for State Senate.
13. District 87: Suhas Subramanyam retired to successfully run for State Senate.
14. District 90: Angelia Williams Graves retired to successfully run for State Senate.
15. District 93: Mike Mullin retired.

== Resignations ==
Six seats were left vacant on the day of the general election due to resignations in 2023.

=== Democrats ===
Two Democrats resigned before the end of their terms.

1. District 74: Lamont Bagby resigned on April 11 to join the State Senate.
2. District 79: Nadarius Clark resigned on March 21 to run for re-election in a neighboring district.

=== Republicans ===
Four Republicans resigned before the end of their terms.

1. District 22: Kathy Byron resigned on September 30 to become deputy director for external affairs of the Virginia Department of Workforce Development and Advancement.
2. District 58: Rob Bell resigned on September 18 to join Virginia Attorney General Jason Miyares's office.
3. District 83: Tim Anderson resigned on April 3 to run for State Senate.
4. District 84: Glenn Davis resigned on April 24 to become director of the Virginia Department of Energy.

== Incumbents defeated ==
=== In primary election ===
One incumbent delegate, a Republican, was defeated in the June 20 primary election.

==== Republicans ====
1. District 47: Marie March lost a redistricting race to fellow incumbent Wren Williams.

=== In general election ===
Two incumbent delegates, a Republican and an independent, were defeated in the November 7 general election.

==== Republicans ====
1. District 97: Karen Greenhalgh lost re-election to Michael Feggans.

==== Independents ====
1. District 51: Matt Fariss (Note: Fariss is a registered Republican but filed for re-election as an independent.) lost re-election to Eric Zehr.

== Special elections ==
There were four special elections for the 162nd Virginia General Assembly. The first was held on January 11, 2022. The following two were held on January 10, 2023. The fourth was held on August 29, 2023.

=== District 89 (special) ===
Incumbent Democrat Jay Jones, first elected in 2017, retired on December 31, 2021.

Virginia's 89th House of Delegates district, 2022 special election
Party	Candidate	Votes	%
Democratic	Jackie Glass	4,436	76.42
Republican	Giovanni G. "Gio" Dolmo	1,356	23.36
Write-in		13	0.22
Total votes		5,805	100.0
Democratic hold			

=== District 24 (special) ===
Incumbent Republican Ronnie Campbell, first elected in 2018, died on December 13, 2022.

Virginia's 24th House of Delegates district, 2023 special election
Party	Candidate	Votes	%
Republican	Ellen Campbell	6,425	62.46
Democratic	Jade D. Harris	3,842	37.35
Write-in		20	0.19
Total votes		10,287	100.0
Republican hold			

=== District 35 (special) ===
Incumbent Democrat Mark Keam, first elected in 2009, resigned on September 6, 2022.

Virginia's 35th House of Delegates district, 2023 special election
Party	Candidate	Votes	%
Democratic	Holly Seibold	7,679	67.70
Republican	Monique L. Baroudi	3,653	32.20
Write-in		11	0.10
Total votes		11,343	100.0
Democratic hold			

=== District 6 (special) ===
Incumbent Republican Jeff Campbell, first elected in 2013, resigned on July 14, 2023. Campbell had already announced his resignation for 2023.

Virginia's 6th House of Delegates district, 2023 special election
Party	Candidate	Votes	%
Republican	Jed Arnold	1,632	80.91
Write-in		385	19.09
Total votes		2,017	100.0
Republican hold			

== Overview ==
↓
49	51
Republican	Democratic

Party		Candidates	Votes		Seats		
Party		Candidates	No.	%	Before	After	+/–
	Democratic	85	1,186,887	49.50	46	51	+5
	Republican	80	1,144,704	47.74	48	49	+1
-	Write-ins	-	49,436	2.06	0	0	0
	Independent	7	11,668	0.49	0	0	0
	Libertarian	2	4,997	0.21	0	0	0
Total			2,397,692	100.00	100	100	

== Close races ==
Seats where the margin of victory was under 10%:

1. HD District 82, 0.2%
2. HD District 41, 0.8%
3. HD District 71, 1.8%
4. HD District 89, 1.8% gain
5. HD District 57, 2%
6. HD District 21, 3.6%
7. HD District 22, 4.6%
8. HD District 97, 4.8% gain
9. HD District 75, 5.8%
10. HD District 65, 6% gain
11. HD District 84, 6.2% gain
12. HD District 30, 6.8%
13. HD District 52, 9%
14. HD District 58, 9%
15. HD District 64, 9%
16. HD District 73, 9%

== Predictions ==
Source	Ranking	As of
270toWin	Lean D (flip)	November 2, 2023
Elections Daily	Tossup	November 2, 2023
CNalysis	Lean D (flip)	November 7, 2023

== Results summary by Virginia House of Delegates district ==
District	Incumbent	Party	Elected delegate	Party
1	Patrick Hope (Note: Redistricted from the 47th district.)	Dem	Patrick Hope	Dem
2	New seat		Adele McClure	Dem
3	Alfonso Lopez (Note: Redistricted from the 49th district.)	Dem	Alfonso Lopez	Dem
4	Charniele Herring (Note: Redistricted from the 46th district.)	Dem	Charniele Herring	Dem
5	Elizabeth Bennett-Parker (Note: Redistricted from the 45th district.)	Dem	Elizabeth Bennett-Parker	Dem
6	Rip Sullivan (Note: Redistricted from the 48th district.)	Dem	Rip Sullivan	Dem
6	Kathleen Murphy (Note: Redistricted from the 34th district.)	Dem	Rip Sullivan	Dem
7	Ken Plum (Note: Redistricted from the 36th district.)	Dem	Karen Keys-Gamarra	Dem
8	Irene Shin (Note: Redistricted from the 86th district.)	Dem	Irene Shin	Dem
9	Karrie Delaney (Note: Redistricted from the 67th district.)	Dem	Karrie Delaney	Dem
10	Dan Helmer (Note: Redistricted from the 40th district.)	Dem	Dan Helmer	Dem
11	David Bulova (Note: Redistricted from the 37th district.)	Dem	David Bulova	Dem
12	Holly Seibold (Note: Redistricted from the 35th district.)	Dem	Holly Seibold	Dem
13	Marcus Simon (Note: Redistricted from the 53rd district.)	Dem	Marcus Simon	Dem
13	Kaye Kory (Note: Redistricted from the 38th district.)	Dem	Marcus Simon	Dem
14	Vivian Watts (Note: Redistricted from the 39th district.)	Dem	Vivian Watts	Dem
15	New seat		Laura Jane Cohen	Dem
16	Paul Krizek (Note: Redistricted from the 44th district.)	Dem	Paul Krizek	Dem
17	Mark Sickles (Note: Redistricted from the 43rd district.)	Dem	Mark Sickles	Dem
18	Kathy Tran (Note: Redistricted from the 42nd district.)	Dem	Kathy Tran	Dem
18	Eileen Filler-Corn (Note: Redistricted from the 41st district.)	Dem	Kathy Tran	Dem
19	New seat		Rozia Henson	Dem
20	Michelle Maldonado (Note: Redistricted from the 50th district.)	Dem	Michelle Maldonado	Dem
20	Danica Roem (Note: Redistricted from the 13th district.)	Dem	Michelle Maldonado	Dem
21	New seat		Josh Thomas	Dem
22	New seat		Ian Lovejoy	Rep
23	Candi King (Note: Redistricted from the 2nd district.)	Dem	Candi King	Dem
24	Luke Torian (Note: Redistricted from the 52nd district.)	Dem	Luke Torian	Dem
24	Elizabeth Guzmán (Note: Redistricted from the 31st district.)	Dem	Luke Torian	Dem
25	Briana Sewell (Note: Redistricted from the 51st district.)	Dem	Briana Sewell	Dem
26	Suhas Subramanyam (Note: Redistricted from the 87th district.)	Dem	Kannan Srinivasan	Dem
27	New seat		Atoosa Reaser	Dem
28	David Reid (Note: Redistricted from the 32nd district.)	Dem	David Reid	Dem
29	New seat		Marty Martinez	Dem
30	Dave LaRock (Note: Redistricted from the 33rd district.)	Rep	Geary Higgins	Rep
31	Wendy Gooditis (Note: Redistricted from the 10th district.)	Dem	Delores Riley Oates	Rep
32	Bill Wiley (Note: Redistricted from the 29th district.)	Rep	Bill Wiley	Rep
33	Todd Gilbert (Note: Redistricted from the 15th district.)	Rep	Todd Gilbert	Rep
34	Tony Wilt (Note: Redistricted from the 26th district.)	Rep	Tony Wilt	Rep
35	Chris Runion (Note: Redistricted from the 25th district.)	Rep	Chris Runion	Rep
36	Ellen Campbell (Note: Redistricted from the 24th district.)	Rep	Ellen Campbell	Rep
36	John Avoli (Note: Redistricted from the 20th district.)	Rep	Ellen Campbell	Rep
37	Terry Austin (Note: Redistricted from the 19th district.)	Rep	Terry Austin	Rep
37	Chris Head (Note: Redistricted from the 17th district.)	Rep	Terry Austin	Rep
38	Sam Rasoul (Note: Redistricted from the 11th district.)	Dem	Sam Rasoul	Dem
39	New seat		Will Davis	Rep
40	Joe McNamara (Note: Redistricted from the 8th district.)	Rep	Joe McNamara	Rep
41	New seat		Chris Obenshain	Rep
42	Jason Ballard (Note: Redistricted from the 12th district.)	Rep	Jason Ballard	Rep
43	Will Morefield (Note: Redistricted from the 3rd district.)	Rep	Will Morefield	Rep
44	Israel O'Quinn (Note: Redistricted from the 5th district.)	Rep	Israel O'Quinn	Rep
44	Will Wampler (Note: Redistricted from the 4th district.)	Rep	Israel O'Quinn	Rep
45	Terry Kilgore (Note: Redistricted from the 1st district.)	Rep	Terry Kilgore	Rep
46	Jed Arnold (Note: Redistricted from the 6th district.)	Rep	Jed Arnold	Rep
47	Wren Williams (Note: Redistricted from the 9th district.)	Rep	Wren Williams	Rep
47	Marie March (Note: Redistricted from the 7th district.)	Rep	Wren Williams	Rep
48	Les Adams (Note: Redistricted from the 16th district.)	Rep	Les Adams	Rep
49	Danny Marshall (Note: Redistricted from the 14th district.)	Rep	Danny Marshall	Rep
49	James Edmunds (Note: Redistricted from the 60th district.)	Rep	Danny Marshall	Rep
50	Tommy Wright (Note: Redistricted from the 61st district.)	Rep	Tommy Wright	Rep
51	Matt Fariss (Note: Redistricted from the 59th district.)	Rep	Eric Zehr	Rep
52	Wendell Walker (Note: Redistricted from the 23rd district.)	Rep	Wendell Walker	Rep
52	Vacant (Note: Redistricted from the 22nd district. Republican Delegate Kathy Byron resigned her seat on September 30, 2023.)		Wendell Walker	Rep
53	New seat		Tim Griffin	Rep
54	Sally Hudson (Note: Redistricted from the 57th district.)	Dem	Katrina Callsen	Dem
55	Vacant (Note: Redistricted from the 58th district. Republican Delegate Rob Bell resigned his seat on September 18, 2023, to join Virginia Attorney General Jason Miyares's office.)		Amy Laufer	Dem
56	John McGuire	Rep	Tom Garrett	Rep
57	New seat		David Owen	Rep
58	Rodney Willett (Note: Redistricted from the 73rd district.)	Dem	Rodney Willett	Dem
59	Buddy Fowler (Note: Redistricted from the 55th district.)	Rep	Buddy Fowler	Rep
60	Scott Wyatt (Note: Redistricted from the 97th district.)	Rep	Scott Wyatt	Rep
61	Michael Webert (Note: Redistricted from the 18th district.)	Rep	Michael Webert	Rep
62	Nick Freitas (Note: Redistricted from the 30th district.)	Rep	Nick Freitas	Rep
63	Phillip Scott (Note: Redistricted from the 88th district.)	Rep	Phillip Scott	Rep
64	New seat		Paul Milde	Rep
65	Tara Durant (Note: Redistricted from the 28th district.)	Rep	Joshua Cole	Dem
66	Bobby Orrock (Note: Redistricted from the 54th district.)	Rep	Bobby Orrock	Rep
67	Margaret Ransone (Note: Redistricted from the 99th district.)	Rep	Hillary Pugh Kent	Rep
68	Keith Hodges (Note: Redistricted from the 98th district.)	Rep	Keith Hodges	Rep
69	Michael Mullin (Note: Redistricted from the 93rd district.)	Dem	Chad Green	Rep
70	Shelly Simonds (Note: Redistricted from the 94th district.)	Dem	Shelly Simonds	Dem
71	Amanda Batten (Note: Redistricted from the 96th district.)	Rep	Amanda Batten	Rep
72	Lee Ware (Note: Redistricted from the 65th district.)	Rep	Lee Ware	Rep
73	Roxann Robinson (Note: Redistricted from the 27th district.)	Rep	Mark Earley Jr.	Rep
74	Mike Cherry (Note: Redistricted from the 66th district.)	Rep	Mike Cherry	Rep
75	Carrie Coyner (Note: Redistricted from the 62nd district.)	Rep	Carrie Coyner	Rep
76	New seat		Debra Gardner	Dem
77	New seat		Michael Jones	Dem
78	Betsy Carr (Note: Redistricted from the 69th district.)	Dem	Betsy Carr	Dem
78	Dawn Adams (Note: Redistricted from the 68th district.)	Dem	Betsy Carr	Dem
78	Jeff Bourne (Note: Redistricted from the 71st district.)	Dem	Betsy Carr	Dem
79	New seat		Rae Cousins	Dem
80	Vacant (Note: Redistricted from the 74th district. Democratic Delegate Lamont Bagby was elected in a special election to succeed Jennifer McClellan in Virginia's 9th Senate district. Bagby vacated the seat on April 11, 2023.)		Destiny Levere Bolling	Dem
80	Schuyler VanValkenburg (Note: Redistricted from the 72nd district.)	Dem	Destiny Levere Bolling	Dem
81	Delores McQuinn (Note: Redistricted from the 70th district.)	Dem	Delores McQuinn	Dem
82	Kim Taylor (Note: Redistricted from the 63rd district.)	Rep	Kim Taylor	Rep
83	Otto Wachsmann (Note: Redistricted from the 75th district.)	Rep	Otto Wachsmann	Rep
84	Emily Brewer (Note: Redistricted from the 64th district.)	Rep	Nadarius Clark	Dem
85	Cia Price (Note: Redistricted from the 95th district.)	Dem	Cia Price	Dem
86	A.C. Cordoza (Note: Redistricted from the 91st district.)	Rep	A.C. Cordoza	Rep
87	Jeion Ward (Note: Redistricted from the 92nd district.)	Dem	Jeion Ward	Dem
88	Don Scott (Note: Redistricted from the 80th district.)	Dem	Don Scott	Dem
88	Vacant (Note: Redistricted from the 79th district. Democratic Delegate Nadarius Clark resigned his seat on March 28, 2023, to run for re-election in the neighboring 84th district.)		Don Scott	Dem
89	Clint Jenkins (Note: Redistricted from the 76th district.)	Dem	Baxter Ennis	Rep
90	Jay Leftwich (Note: Redistricted from the 78th district.)	Rep	Jay Leftwich	Rep
91	Cliff Hayes Jr. (Note: Redistricted from the 77th district.)	Dem	Cliff Hayes Jr.	Dem
92	New seat		Bonita Anthony	Dem
93	Jackie Glass (Note: Redistricted from the 89th district.)	Dem	Jackie Glass	Dem
93	Angelia Williams Graves (Note: Redistricted from the 90th district.)	Dem	Jackie Glass	Dem
94	New seat		Phil Hernandez	Dem
95	New seat		Alex Askew	Dem
96	Kelly Convirs-Fowler (Note: Redistricted from the 21st district.)	Dem	Kelly Convirs-Fowler	Dem
97	Karen Greenhalgh (Note: Redistricted from the 85th district.)	Rep	Michael Feggans	Dem
98	Barry Knight (Note: Redistricted from the 81st district.)	Rep	Barry Knight	Rep
98	Vacant (Note: Redistricted from the 84th district. Republican Delegate Glenn Davis resigned his seat on April 24, 2023.)		Barry Knight	Rep
99	Anne Ferrell Tata (Note: Redistricted from the 82nd district.)	Rep	Anne Ferrell Tata	Rep
100	Robert Bloxom Jr.	Rep	Robert Bloxom Jr.	Rep
100	Vacant (Note: Redistricted from the 83rd district. Republican Delegate Tim Anderson resigned his seat on April 3, 2023.)		Robert Bloxom Jr.	Rep

== Polling ==
Poll source	Date(s) administered	Sample size size (Note: Key: A – all adults RV – registered voters LV – likely voters V – unclear)	Margin of error	Democratic Party	Republican Party	Other / undecided
Virginia Commonwealth University	July 14–25, 2023	804 (A)	± 5.46%	41%	47%	13%

== District 1 ==
District map

House District 1 contains portions of Arlington County. The incumbent delegate was Democrat Patrick Hope, who was first elected in 2009.

=== Democratic primary ===
==== Nominee ====
- Patrick Hope, incumbent

=== General election ===
Predictions

Source	Ranking	As of
CNalysis	Safe D	September 6, 2023
Elections Daily	Safe D	November 2, 2023

Virginia's 1st House of Delegates District, 2023 general election
Party	Candidate	Votes	%
Democratic	Patrick Hope (incumbent)	24,483	95.54
Write-in		1,142	4.46
Total votes		25,625	100
Democratic hold			

== District 2 ==
District map

House District 2 contains portions of Arlington County. This was an open seat following redistricting.

=== Democratic primary ===
==== Nominee ====
- Adele McClure, community activist

==== Withdrawn ====
- Kevin Saucedo-Broach, former Chief of Staff for Alfonso Lopez (will remain on primary ballot)

==== Results ====
Virginia's 2nd House of Delegates district, 2023 Democratic primary
Party	Candidate	Votes	%
Democratic	Adele McClure	6,267	89.59%
Democratic	Kevin Saucedo-Broach (withdrawn)	728	10.41%
Total votes		6,995	100.00%

=== General election ===
Predictions

Source	Ranking	As of
CNalysis	Safe D	September 6, 2023
Elections Daily	Safe D	November 2, 2023

Virginia's 2nd House of Delegates District, 2023 general election
Party	Candidate	Votes	%
Democratic	Adele McClure	17,409	95.3
Write-in		859	4.7
Total votes		18,268	100%
Democratic win (new seat)			

== District 3 ==
District map

House District 3 is located partially within the city of Alexandria and Arlington County. The incumbent delegate was Democrat Alfonso Lopez, who was first elected in 2011.

=== Democratic primary ===
==== Nominee ====
- Alfonso Lopez, incumbent

=== Independents ===
==== Declared ====
- Mike Webb, U.S. Army veteran and perennial candidate

=== General election ===
Predictions

Source	Ranking	As of
CNalysis	Solid D	September 6, 2023
Elections Daily	Safe D	November 2, 2023

Virginia's 3rd House of Delegates District, 2023 general election
Party	Candidate	Votes	%
Democratic	Alfonso Lopez (incumbent)	17,416	81.66%
Independent	Mike Webb	3,651	17.12%
Write-in		260	1.22%
Total votes		21,327	100%
Democratic hold			

== District 4 ==
District map

House District 4 is located partially within the city of Alexandria and Fairfax County. The incumbent delegate was Democrat Charniele Herring, who was first elected in 2009.

=== Democratic primary ===
==== Nominee ====
- Charniele Herring, incumbent

=== General election ===
Predictions

Source	Ranking	As of
CNalysis	Safe D	September 6, 2023
Elections Daily	Safe D	November 2, 2023

Virginia's 4th House of Delegates District, 2023 general election
Party	Candidate	Votes	%
Democratic	Charniele Herring (incumbent)	10,843	93.18%
Write-in		794	6.82%
Total votes		11,637	100.00%
Democratic hold			

== District 5 ==
District map

House District 5 contains portions of the city of Alexandria. The incumbent delegate was Democrat Elizabeth Bennett-Parker, who was first elected in 2021.

=== Democratic primary ===
==== Nominee ====
- Elizabeth Bennett-Parker, incumbent

=== General election ===
Predictions

Source	Ranking	As of
CNalysis	Safe D	September 6, 2023
Elections Daily	Safe D	November 2, 2023

Virginia's 5th House of Delegates District, 2023 general election
Party	Candidate	Votes	%
Democratic	Elizabeth Bennett-Parker (incumbent)	22,359	91.37%
Write-in		2,111	8.63%
Total votes		24,470	100
Democratic hold			

== District 6 ==
District map

House District 6 contains portions of Fairfax County. This district had two incumbents following redistricting: Democrat Kathleen Murphy, who was first elected in 2015, and Democrat Rip Sullivan, who was first elected in 2014.

=== Democratic primary ===
==== Nominee ====
- Rip Sullivan, incumbent

==== Declined ====
- Kathleen Murphy, incumbent

=== Republican primary ===
==== Nominee ====
- Kristin Hoffman, IT executive

=== General election ===
Predictions

Source	Ranking	As of
CNalysis	Solid D	September 6, 2023
Elections Daily	Safe D	November 2, 2023

Virginia's 6th House of Delegates District, 2023 general election
Party	Candidate	Votes	%
Democratic	Rip Sullivan (incumbent)	20,144	61.93%
Republican	Kristin Hoffman	12,303	37.82%
Write-in		81	0.25%
Total votes		32,528	100%
Democratic hold			

== District 7 ==
District map

House District 7 contains portions of Fairfax County. The incumbent delegate was Democrat Ken Plum, who was first elected in 1981.

=== Democratic primary ===
==== Nominee ====
- Karen Keys-Gamarra, Fairfax County School Board member

==== Eliminated in primary ====
- Mary Barthelson, space engineer and candidate for HD-36 in 2021
- Paul Berry, teacher
- Shyamali Hauth, U.S. Air Force veteran

==== Withdrawn ====
- John Farrell, Reston Association Board of Directors member

==== Declined ====
- Ken Plum, incumbent delegate

==== Results ====
Virginia's 7th House of Delegates district, 2023 Democratic primary
Party	Candidate	Votes	%
Democratic	Karen Keys-Gamarra	3,224	37.03%
Democratic	Paul Berry	2,466	28.33%
Democratic	Shyamali Hauth	2,296	26.37%
Democratic	Mary Barthelson	720	8.27%
Total votes		8,706	100.00%

=== Republican primary ===
==== Nominee ====
- Luellen Maskeny, author

=== General election ===
Predictions

Source	Ranking	As of
CNalysis	Solid D	September 6, 2023
Elections Daily	Safe D	November 2, 2023

Virginia's 7th House of Delegates District, 2023 general election
Party	Candidate	Votes	%
Democratic	Karen Keys-Gamarra	22,705	73.26%
Republican	Luellen Maskeny	8,199	26.45%
Write-in		89	0.29%
Total votes		30,993	100%
Democratic hold			

== District 8 ==
District map

House District 8 contains portions of Fairfax County. The incumbent delegate was Democrat Irene Shin, who was first elected in 2021.

=== Democratic primary ===
==== Nominee ====
- Irene Shin, incumbent

=== Republican primary ===
==== Nominee ====
- Max Fisher, aviation industry worker

=== General election ===
Predictions

Source	Ranking	As of
CNalysis	Solid D	September 6, 2023
Elections Daily	Safe D	November 2, 2023

Virginia's 8th House of Delegates District, 2023 general election
Party	Candidate	Votes	%
Democratic	Irene Shin (incumbent)	14,851	67.65%
Republican	Max Fisher	7,023	31.99%
Write-in		79	0.36%
Total votes		21,953	100%
Democratic hold			

== District 9 ==
District map

House District 9 contains portions of Fairfax County. The incumbent delegate was Democrat Karrie Delaney, who was first elected in 2017.

=== Democratic primary ===
==== Nominee ====
- Karrie Delaney, incumbent

=== Republican primary ===
==== Nominee ====
- Nhan Huynh, IT consultant and U.S. Army veteran

=== General election ===
Predictions

Source	Ranking	As of
CNalysis	Solid D	September 6, 2023
Elections Daily	Safe D	November 2, 2023

Virginia's 9th House of Delegates District, 2023 general election
Party	Candidate	Votes	%
Democratic	Karrie Delaney (incumbent)	14,226	61.11%
Republican	Nhan Huynh	8,989	38.61%
Write-in		65	0.28%
Total votes		23,280	100%
Democratic hold			

== District 10 ==
District map

House District 10 contains portions of Fairfax County. The incumbent delegate was Democrat Dan Helmer, who was first elected in 2019.

=== Democratic primary ===
==== Nominee ====
- Dan Helmer, incumbent

=== Republican primary ===
==== Nominee ====
- James Thomas, U.S. Marine veteran

=== General election ===
Predictions

Source	Ranking	As of
CNalysis	Solid D	September 6, 2023
Elections Daily	Safe D	November 2, 2023

Virginia's 10th House of Delegates District, 2023 general election
Party	Candidate	Votes	%
Democratic	Dan Helmer (incumbent)	15,569	59.44%
Republican	James Thomas	10,547	40.27%
Write-in		76	0.29%
Total votes		26,192	100%
Democratic hold			

== District 11 ==
District map

House District 11 contains all of the city of Fairfax and portions of Fairfax County. The incumbent delegate was Democrat David Bulova, who was first elected in 2005.

=== Democratic primary ===
==== Nominee ====
- David Bulova, incumbent

=== Republican primary ===
==== Nominee ====
- Almira Mohammed, medical student

=== General election ===
Predictions

Source	Ranking	As of
CNalysis	Solid D	September 6, 2023
Elections Daily	Safe D	November 2, 2023

Virginia's 11th House of Delegates District, 2023 general election
Party	Candidate	Votes	%
Democratic	David Bulova (incumbent)	15,863	70.61
Republican	Almira Mohammed	6,530	29.07
Write-in		73	0.32
Total votes		22,466	100%
Democratic hold			

== District 12 ==
District map

House District 12 contains portions of Fairfax County. The incumbent delegate was Democrat Holly Seibold, who was first elected in 2023.

=== Democratic primary ===
==== Nominee ====
- Holly Seibold, incumbent

=== General election ===
Predictions

Source	Ranking	As of
CNalysis	Safe D	September 6, 2023
Elections Daily	Safe D	November 2, 2023

Virginia's 12th House of Delegates District, 2023 general election
Party	Candidate	Votes	%
Democratic	Holly Seibold (incumbent)	18,550	92.43
Write-in		1,519	7.57
Total votes		20,069	100.00
Democratic hold			

== District 13 ==
District map

House District 13 contains all of the city of Falls Church and portions of Fairfax County. This district had two incumbents following redistricting: Democrat Kaye Kory, who was first elected in 2009, and Democrat Marcus Simon, who was first elected in 2013.

=== Democratic primary ===
==== Nominee ====
- Marcus Simon, incumbent

==== Declined ====
- Kaye Kory, incumbent

=== Libertarian convention ===
==== Nominee ====
- Dave Crance, regional hotel manager

=== General election ===
Predictions

Source	Ranking	As of
CNalysis	Solid D	September 6, 2023
Elections Daily	Safe D	November 2, 2023

Virginia's 13th House of Delegates District, 2023 general election
Party	Candidate	Votes	%
Democratic	Marcus Simon (incumbent)	16,778	78.53
Libertarian	Dave Crance	4,323	20.23
Write-in		265	1.24
Total votes		21,366	100.00
Democratic hold			

== District 14 ==
District map

House District 14 contains portions of Fairfax County. The incumbent delegate was Democrat Vivian Watts, who was first elected in 1995.

=== Democratic primary ===
==== Nominee ====
- Vivian Watts, incumbent

=== Republican primary ===
==== Nominee ====
- Curtis Wells, general contractor and former presidential escort

=== General election ===
Predictions

Source	Ranking	As of
CNalysis	Solid D	September 6, 2023
Elections Daily	Safe D	November 2, 2023

Virginia's 14th House of Delegates District, 2023 general election
Party	Candidate	Votes	%
Democratic	Vivian Watts (incumbent)	13,870	69.41
Republican	Curtis Wells	6,056	30.31
Write-in		56	0.28
Total votes		19,982	100
Democratic hold			

== District 15 ==
District map

House District 15 contains portions of Fairfax County. This was an open seat following redistricting.

=== Democratic primary ===
==== Nominee ====
- Laura Jane Cohen, Fairfax County School Board member

==== Eliminated in primary ====
- Eric Schmidt, entrepreneur
- Henri' Thompson, teacher

==== Results ====
Virginia's 15th House of Delegates district, 2023 Democratic primary
Party	Candidate	Votes	%
Democratic	Laura Jane Cohen	6,063	65.89%
Democratic	Eric Schmidt	2,457	26.70%
Democratic	Henri Thompson	682	7.41%
Total votes		9,202	100.00%

=== Republican primary ===
==== Nominee ====
- Marcus Evans, IT specialist

=== Independents ===
==== Withdrawn ====
- Anna LaNave

=== General election ===
Predictions

Source	Ranking	As of
CNalysis	Solid D	September 6, 2023
Elections Daily	Safe D	November 2, 2023

Virginia's 15th House of Delegates District, 2023 general election
Party	Candidate	Votes	%
Democratic	Laura Jane Cohen	19,394	61.85
Republican	Marcus Evans	11,880	37.89
Write-in		81	0.26
Total votes		31,274	100
Democratic win (new seat)			

== District 16 ==
District map

House District 16 contains portions of Fairfax County. The incumbent delegate was Democrat Paul Krizek, who was first elected in 2015.

=== Democratic primary ===
==== Nominee ====
- Paul Krizek, incumbent

=== General election ===
Predictions

Source	Ranking	As of
CNalysis	Safe D	September 6, 2023
Elections Daily	Safe D	November 2, 2023

Virginia's 16th House of Delegates District, 2023 general election
Party	Candidate	Votes	%
Democratic	Paul Krizek (incumbent)	16,985	90.61
Write-in		1,760	9.39
Total votes		18,745	100
Democratic hold			

== District 17 ==
District map

House District 17 contains portions of Fairfax County. The incumbent delegate was Democrat Mark Sickles, who was first elected in 2003.

=== Democratic primary ===
==== Nominee ====
- Mark Sickles, incumbent

=== Republican primary ===
==== Withdrawn ====
- Richard Mereu, government relations officer

=== General election ===
Predictions

Source	Ranking	As of
CNalysis	Solid D	September 6, 2023
Elections Daily	Safe D	November 2, 2023

Virginia's 17th House of Delegates District, 2023 general election
Party	Candidate	Votes	%
Democratic	Mark Sickles (incumbent)	17,931	92.18
Write-in		1,521	7.82
Total votes		19,452	100
Democratic hold			

== District 18 ==
District map

House District 18 contains portions of Fairfax County. This district had two incumbents following redistricting: Democrat Eileen Filler-Corn, who was first elected in 2010, and Democrat Kathy Tran, who was first elected in 2017.

=== Democratic primary ===
==== Nominee ====
- Kathy Tran, incumbent

==== Declined ====
- Eileen Filler-Corn, incumbent

=== Republican primary ===
==== Nominee ====
- Ed McGovern, retired Department of the Army employee and nominee for HD-42 in 2021

=== General election ===
Predictions

Source	Ranking	As of
CNalysis	Solid D	September 6, 2023
Elections Daily	Safe D	November 2, 2023

Virginia's 18th House of Delegates District, 2023 general election
Party	Candidate	Votes	%
Democratic	Kathy Tran (incumbent)	15,973	65.58
Republican	Ed McGovern	8,293	34.05
Write-in		90	0.37
Total votes		24,356	100
Democratic hold			

== District 19 ==
District map

House District 19 contains portions of Fairfax County and Prince William County. This was an open seat following redistricting.

=== Democratic primary ===
==== Nominee ====
- Rozia Henson, federal contractor

==== Eliminated in primary ====
- Makya Little, former FBI employee
- Natalie Shorter, financier and granddaughter of Louise Lucas

==== Results ====
Virginia's 19th House of Delegates district, 2023 Democratic primary
Party	Candidate	Votes	%
Democratic	Rozia Henson	1,388	38.72%
Democratic	Makya Little	1,339	37.35%
Democratic	Natalie Shorter	858	23.93%
Total votes		3,585	100.00%

=== General election ===
Predictions

Source	Ranking	As of
CNalysis	Safe D	September 6, 2023
Elections Daily	Safe D	November 2, 2023

Virginia's 19th House of Delegates District, 2023 general election
Party	Candidate	Votes	%
Democratic	Rozia Henson	9,937	91.17
Write-in		962	8.83
Total votes		10,899	100
Democratic win (new seat)			

== District 20 ==
District map

House District 20 contains all of the cities of Manassas and Manassas Park, as well as portions of Prince William County. This seat had two incumbents following redistricting: Democrats Michelle Maldonado, who was first elected in 2021, and Danica Roem, who was first elected in 2017.

=== Democratic primary ===
==== Nominee ====
- Michelle Maldonado, incumbent

==== Declined ====
- Danica Roem, incumbent (running for SD-30)

=== Republican primary ===
==== Nominee ====
- Sharon E. Ashurst, former chair of the Manassas GOP committee

=== General election ===
Predictions

Source	Ranking	As of
CNalysis	Solid D	September 6, 2023
Elections Daily	Safe D	November 2, 2023

Virginia's 20th House of Delegates District, 2023 general election
Party	Candidate	Votes	%
Democratic	Michelle Maldonado (incumbent)	9,740	56.60
Republican	Sharon E. Ashurst	7,422	43.13
Write-in		45	0.26
Total votes		17,207	100
Democratic hold			

== District 21 ==
District map

House District 21 contains portions of Prince William County. This was an open seat following redistricting.

=== Democratic primary ===
==== Nominee ====
- Josh Thomas, U.S. Marine veteran and attorney

=== Republican primary ===
==== Nominee ====
- John Stirrup, lobbyist and former Prince William County supervisor

==== Eliminated in primary ====
- Josh Quill, U.S. Marine veteran

==== Results ====
Virginia's 21st House of Delegates district, 2023 Republican primary
Party	Candidate	Votes	%
Republican	John Stirrup	2,881	65.06%
Republican	Josh Quill	1,547	34.94%
Total votes		4,428	100.00%

=== General election ===
Predictions

Source	Ranking	As of
CNalysis	Tilt D	October 17, 2023
Elections Daily	Lean D	November 2, 2023

==== Endorsements ====
John Stirrup (R)

State officials

- Glenn Youngkin, Governor of Virginia (2022–present)

Virginia's 21st House of Delegates District, 2023 general election
Party	Candidate	Votes	%
Democratic	Josh Thomas	13,926	51.72
Republican	John Stirrup	12,951	48.10
Write-in		50	0.19
Total votes		26,927	100
Democratic win (new seat)			

== District 22 ==
District map

House District 22 contains portions of Prince William County. This was an open seat following redistricting.

=== Republican primary ===
==== Nominee ====
- Ian Lovejoy, entrepreneur/business owner, former Manassas City Councilor and nominee for HD-50 in 2019

=== Democratic primary ===
==== Nominee ====
- Travis Nembhard, adjunct professor at American University

=== General election ===
Predictions

Source	Ranking	As of
CNalysis	Tilt R	November 6, 2023
Elections Daily	Lean R	November 2, 2023

==== Endorsements ====
Ian Lovejoy (R)

State officials

- Jackson Miller, former member of the Virginia House of Delegates for the 50th district (2006-2018)
- Jason Miyares, 48th attorney general of Virginia (2022-present), former member of the Virginia House of Delegates for the 82nd district (2016-2022)
- Glenn Youngkin, 74th governor of Virginia (2022-present)

Local officials

- Shawn Brann, former Brentsville District Representative for the Prince William County Public Schools Board (2016-2017)
- Glen Hill, Prince William County sheriff
- Milton C. Johns, former Prince William County Public Schools board chair (2008-2015), former Brentsville District Representative for the Prince William County Public Schools Board (2004-2007)
- Michael May, Republican nominee for Prince William County Commonwealth Attorney in 2015 and 2019, former Occoquan District Representative for the Prince William County Board of Supervisors (2007-2015)

Organizations

- American Veterans Vote
- Prince William County Police Association
- Virginia Professional Fire Fighters
Travis Nembhard (D)

Organizations

- Giffords
- Sierra Club
- UFCW Local 400

Virginia's 22nd House of Delegates District, 2023 general election
Party	Candidate	Votes	%
Republican	Ian Lovejoy	16,032	52.19
Democratic	Travis Nembhard	14,616	47.58
Write-in		70	0.23
Total votes		30,718	100
Republican win (new seat)			

== District 23 ==
District map

House District 23 contains portions of Prince William County and Stafford County. The incumbent delegate was Democrat Candi King, who was first elected in 2021.

=== Democratic primary ===
==== Nominee ====
- Candi King, incumbent

=== Republican primary ===
==== Nominee ====
- James Tully, U.S. Marine veteran

=== General election ===
Predictions

Source	Ranking	As of
CNalysis	Solid D	September 6, 2023
Elections Daily	Safe D	November 2, 2023

Virginia's 23rd House of Delegates District, 2023 general election
Party	Candidate	Votes	%
Democratic	Candi King (incumbent)	10,155	67.95
Republican	James Tully	4,733	31.67
Write-in		57	0.38
Total votes		14,945	100
Democratic hold			

== District 24 ==
District map

House District 24 contains portions of Prince William County. This seat had two incumbents following redistricting: Democrat Elizabeth Guzmán, who was first elected in 2017, and Democrat Luke Torian, who was first elected in 2009. Delegate Guzmán announced she would be running for State Senate.

=== Democratic primary ===
==== Nominee ====
- Luke Torian, incumbent

==== Declined ====
- Elizabeth Guzmán, incumbent (running for SD-29)

=== General election ===
Predictions

Source	Ranking	As of
CNalysis	Safe D	September 6, 2023
Elections Daily	Safe D	November 2, 2023

Virginia's 24th House of Delegates District, 2023 general election
Party	Candidate	Votes	%
Democratic	Luke Torian (incumbent)	14,614	90.83
Write-in		1,475	9.17
Total votes		16,089	100
Democratic hold			

== District 25 ==
District map

House District 25 contains portions of Prince William County. The incumbent delegate was Democrat Briana Sewell, who was first elected in 2021.

=== Democratic primary ===
==== Nominee ====
- Briana Sewell, incumbent

=== Republican primary ===
==== Nominee ====
- John S. Gray, candidate for school board in 2015

=== General election ===
Predictions

Source	Ranking	As of
CNalysis	Solid D	September 6, 2023
Elections Daily	Safe D	November 2, 2023

Virginia's 25th House of Delegates District, 2023 general election
Party	Candidate	Votes	%
Democratic	Briana Sewell (incumbent)	13,404	61.56
Republican	John S. Gray	8,263	37.95
Write-in		106	0.48
Total votes		21,773	100
Democratic hold			

== District 26 ==
District map

House District 26 contains portions of Loudoun County. The incumbent delegate was Democrat Suhas Subramanyam, who was first elected in 2019.

=== Democratic primary ===
==== Nominee ====
- Kannan Srinivasan, finance professional

==== Eliminated in primary ====
- Sirisha Kompalli, businesswoman

==== Failed to qualify ====
- Sreedhar Nagireddi, IT professional

==== Declined ====
- Suhas Subramanyam, incumbent (running for SD-32)

==== Results ====
Virginia's 26th House of Delegates district, 2023 Democratic primary
Party	Candidate	Votes	%
Democratic	Kannan Srinivasan	3,788	67.79%
Democratic	Sirisha Kompalli	1,800	32.21%
Total votes		5,588	100.00%

=== Republican primary ===
==== Nominee ====
- Rafi Khaja, educator

=== General election ===
Predictions

Source	Ranking	As of
CNalysis	Solid D	September 6, 2023
Elections Daily	Safe D	November 2, 2023

Virginia's 26th House of Delegates District, 2023 general election
Party	Candidate	Votes	%
Democratic	Kannan Srinivasan	13,119	60.89
Republican	Rafi Khaja	8,362	38.81
Write-in		66	0.31
Total votes		21,547	100
Democratic hold			

== District 27 ==
District map

House District 27 contains portions of Loudoun County. This was an open seat following redistricting.

=== Democratic primary ===
==== Nominee ====
- Atoosa Reaser, Loudoun County School Board member

==== Withdrawn ====
- Kannan Srinivasan, finance professional (running in HD-26)

=== Republican primary ===
==== Nominee ====
- Chris Harnisch, former Deputy Coordinator for Counterterrorism at the U.S. State Department

=== General election ===
Predictions

Source	Ranking	As of
CNalysis	Solid D	September 6, 2023
Elections Daily	Safe D	November 2, 2023

Virginia's 27th House of Delegates District, 2023 general election
Party	Candidate	Votes	%
Democratic	Atoosa Reaser	13,191	57.13
Republican	Chris Harnisch	9,758	42.26
Write-in		139	0.60
Total votes		23,088	100
Democratic win (new seat)			

== District 28 ==
District map

House District 28 contains portions of Loudoun County. The incumbent delegate was Democrat David Reid, who was first elected in 2017.

=== Democratic primary ===
==== Nominee ====
- David Reid, incumbent

=== Republican primary ===
==== Nominee ====
- Paul Lott, education consultant and candidate for VA-10 in 2022

=== General election ===
Predictions

Source	Ranking	As of
CNalysis	Solid D	September 6, 2023
Elections Daily	Safe D	November 2, 2023

Virginia's 28th House of Delegates District, 2023 general election
Party	Candidate	Votes	%
Democratic	David Reid (incumbent)	17,583	61.18
Republican	Paul Lott	11,048	38.44
Write-in		110	0.38
Total votes		28,741	100
Democratic hold			

== District 29 ==
District map

House District 29 contains portions of Loudoun County. This was an open seat following redistricting.

=== Democratic primary ===
==== Nominee ====
- Marty Martinez, Leesburg City Council member

==== Failed to qualify ====
- Michelle Thomas, pastor

=== Republican primary ===
==== Nominee ====
- Jonathan Mark Rogers, educator

=== General election ===
Predictions

Source	Ranking	As of
CNalysis	Solid D	September 6, 2023
Elections Daily	Safe D	November 2, 2023

Virginia's 29th House of Delegates District, 2023 general election
Party	Candidate	Votes	%
Democratic	Marty Martinez	18,125	56.93
Republican	Jonathan Mark Rogers	13,362	42.78
Write-in		91	0.29
Total votes		31,837	100
Democratic win (new seat)			

== District 30 ==
District map

House District 30 contains portions of Fauquier County and Loudoun County. The incumbent was Republican Dave LaRock, who was first elected in 2013.

=== Nominee ===
- Geary Higgins, former Loudoun County supervisor and nominee for SD-13 in 2019

==== Failed to qualify ====
- Caleb Max, businessman and Republican candidate for VA-10 in 2022

==== Declined ====
- Dave LaRock, incumbent delegate (ran for SD-1)

=== Democratic primary ===
==== Nominee ====
- Robert Banse, reverend

==== Failed to qualify ====
- Max Sawicky, economist

=== General election ===
Predictions

Source	Ranking	As of
CNalysis	Tilt R	October 17, 2023
Elections Daily	Lean R	November 6, 2023

Virginia's 30th House of Delegates District, 2023 general election
Party	Candidate	Votes	%
Republican	Geary Higgins	20,741	53.12
Democratic	Robert Banse	18,238	46.71
Write-in		66	0.17
Total votes		39,045	100
Republican hold			

== District 31 ==
District map

House District 31 contains all of Clarke County and portions of Frederick County and Warren County. The incumbent delegate was Democrat Wendy Gooditis, who was first elected in 2017.

=== Democratic primary ===
==== Nominee ====
- Steven Foreman, former chair of the Warren County Democratic committee

==== Declined ====
- Wendy Gooditis, incumbent

=== Republican firehouse primary ===
==== Nominee ====
- Delores Riley Oates, Warren County supervisor

==== Defeated in primary ====
- Michelle Lane Smithwick, nurse practitioner

==== Results ====
Virginia's 31st House of Delegates district, 2023 Republican firehouse primary
Party	Candidate	Votes	%
Republican	Delores Riley Oates	914	87.8
Republican	Michelle Lane Smithwick	117	11.2
Total votes		1,031	100

=== Independents ===
==== Declared ====
- Grace Elizabeth Morrison, educator

=== General election ===
Predictions

Source	Ranking	As of
CNalysis	Solid R	September 6, 2023
Elections Daily	Safe R	November 2, 2023

Virginia's 31st House of Delegates District, 2023 general election
Party	Candidate	Votes	%
Republican	Delores Riley Oates	16,745	60.23
Democratic	Steven Foreman	9,745	35.05
Independent	Grace Elizabeth Morrison	1,252	4.50
Write-in		61	0.22
Total votes		27,803	100
Republican gain from Democratic			

== District 32 ==
District map

House District 32 contains the entire city of Winchester and portions of Frederick County. The incumbent delegate was Republican Bill Wiley, who was first elected in 2020.

=== Republican primary ===
==== Nominee ====
- Bill Wiley, incumbent

=== Democratic primary ===
==== Nominee ====
- Mady Rodriguez, adjunct professor at Shenandoah University

=== General election ===
Predictions

Source	Ranking	As of
CNalysis	Solid R	September 6, 2023
Elections Daily	Safe R	November 2, 2023

Virginia's 32nd House of Delegates District, 2023 general election
Party	Candidate	Votes	%
Republican	Bill Wiley (incumbent)	13,320	60.83
Democratic	Mady Rodriguez	8,533	38.97
Write-in		44	0.20
Total votes		21,897	100
Republican hold			

== District 33 ==
District map

House District 33 contains all of Page County and Shenandoah County, as well as portions of Rockingham County and Warren County. The incumbent delegate was Republican Todd Gilbert, who was first elected in 2005.

=== Republican primary ===
==== Nominee ====
- Todd Gilbert, incumbent

=== Democratic primary ===
==== Nominee ====
- Bob Smith, U.S. Army veteran

=== General election ===
Predictions

Source	Ranking	As of
CNalysis	Solid R	September 6, 2023
Elections Daily	Safe R	November 2, 2023

Virginia's 33rd House of Delegates District, 2023 general election
Party	Candidate	Votes	%
Republican	Todd Gilbert (incumbent)	21,554	77.71
Democratic	Bob Smith	6,139	22.13
Write-in		44	0.16
Total votes		27,737	100
Republican hold			

== District 34 ==
District map

House District 34 contains the city of Harrisonburg and portions of Rockingham County. The incumbent delegate was Republican Tony Wilt, who was first elected in 2010.

=== Republican primary ===
==== Nominee ====
- Tony Wilt, incumbent

=== Democratic primary ===
==== Nominee ====
- Esther Nizer, IT manager

=== General election- ===
Predictions

Source	Ranking	As of
CNalysis	Solid R	September 6, 2023
Elections Daily	Safe R	November 2, 2023

Virginia's 34th House of Delegates District, 2023 general election
Party	Candidate	Votes	%
Republican	Tony Wilt (incumbent)	10,368	56.87
Democratic	Esther Nizer	7,846	43.04
Write-in		17	0.09
Total votes		18,231	100
Republican hold			

== District 35 ==
District map

House District 35 contains all of Bath County and Highland County, as well as portions of Augusta County and Rockingham County. The incumbent delegate was Republican Chris Runion, who was first elected in 2019.

=== Republican primary ===
==== Nominee ====
- Chris Runion, incumbent

=== General election ===
Predictions

Source	Ranking	As of
CNalysis	Safe R	September 6, 2023
Elections Daily	Safe R	November 2, 2023

Virginia's 35th House of Delegates District, 2023 general election
Party	Candidate	Votes	%
Republican	Chris Runion (incumbent)	22,104	96.40
Write-in		826	3.60
Total votes		22,930	100
Republican hold			

== District 36 ==
District map

House District 36 contains the cities of Staunton and Waynesboro, as well as portions of Augusta County and Rockbridge County. This district had two incumbents following redistricting: Republican John Avoli, who was first elected in 2019, and Republican Ellen Campbell, who was first elected in 2023.

=== Republican primary ===
==== Nominee ====
- Ellen Campbell, incumbent

==== Declined ====
- John Avoli, incumbent

=== Democratic primary ===
==== Nominee ====
- Randall Wolf, Democratic nominee for HD-20 in 2021

=== General election ===
Predictions

Source	Ranking	As of
CNalysis	Solid R	September 6, 2023
Elections Daily	Safe R	November 2, 2023

Virginia's 36th House of Delegates District, 2023 general election
Party	Candidate	Votes	%
Republican	Ellen Campbell (incumbent)	14,154	60.09
Democratic	Randall Wolf	9,383	39.83
Write-in		19	0.08
Total votes		23,556	100
Republican hold			

== District 37 ==
District map

House District 37 contains the cities of Buena Vista, Covington, and Lexington, as well as all of Alleghany County, Botetourt County, and Craig County. Also portions of Rockbridge County. The district had two incumbents following redistricting: Republicans Terry Austin, who was first elected in 2013, and Chris Head, who was first elected in 2011.

=== Republican primary ===
==== Nominee ====
- Terry Austin, incumbent

==== Declined ====
- Chris Head, incumbent (running for SD-3)

=== Democratic primary ===
==== Nominee ====
- Stephanie Clark, former mayor of Covington

=== General election ===
Predictions

Source	Ranking	As of
CNalysis	Solid R	September 6, 2023
Elections Daily	Safe R	November 2, 2023

Virginia's 37th House of Delegates District, 2023 general election
Party	Candidate	Votes	%
Republican	Terry Austin (incumbent)	18,707	67.14
Democratic	Stephanie Clark	8,259	30.53
Write-in		90	0.33
Total votes		27,056	100
Republican hold			

== District 38 ==
District map

House District 38 contains portions of the city of Roanoke. The incumbent delegate was Democrat Sam Rasoul, who was first elected in 2013.

=== Democratic primary ===
==== Nominee ====
- Sam Rasoul, incumbent

=== General election ===
Predictions

Source	Ranking	As of
CNalysis	Safe D	September 6, 2023
Elections Daily	Safe D	November 2, 2023

Virginia's 38th House of Delegates District, 2023 general election
Party	Candidate	Votes	%
Democratic	Sam Rasoul (incumbent)	12,632	91.81
Write-in		1,127	8.19
Total votes		13,759	100
Democratic hold			

== District 39 ==
District map

House District 39 contains all of Franklin County and portions of Roanoke County. This was an open seat following redistricting.

=== Republican primary ===
==== Nominee ====
- Will Davis, attorney

==== Eliminated in primary ====
- Ron Jefferson, retired lineman for Appalachian Power

==== Endorsements ====
Ron Jefferson

State legislators

- Kathy Byron, state delegate from the 22nd district (1998-present)

==== Results ====
Virginia's 39th House of Delegates district, 2023 Republican primary
Party	Candidate	Votes	%
Republican	Will Davis	4,748	78.36%
Republican	Ron J. Jefferson	1,311	21.64%
Total votes		6,059	100.00%

=== Democratic primary ===
==== Did not quality ====
- Gregory Maxwell

=== General election ===
Predictions

Source	Ranking	As of
CNalysis	Safe R	September 6, 2023
Elections Daily	Safe R	November 2, 2023

Virginia's 39th House of Delegates District, 2023 general election
Party	Candidate	Votes	%
Republican	Will Davis	19,077	95.28
Write-in		944	4.72
Total votes		20,021	100
Republican win (new seat)			

== District 40 ==
District map

House District 40 contains the entire city of Salem, portions of the city of Roanoke, and portions of Roanoke County. The incumbent delegate was Republican Joe McNamara, who was first elected in 2018.

=== Republican primary ===
==== Nominee ====
- Joe McNamara, incumbent

=== Democratic primary ===
==== Nominee ====
- Misty Dawn Vickers, social worker

=== General election ===
Predictions

Source	Ranking	As of
CNalysis	Solid R	September 6, 2023
Elections Daily	Safe R	November 2, 2023

Virginia's 40th House of Delegates District, 2023 general election
Party	Candidate	Votes	%
Republican	Joe McNamara (incumbent)	15,889	59.71
Democratic	Misty Dawn Vickers	10,667	40.08
Write-in		56	0.21
Total votes		26,612	100
Republican hold			

== District 41 ==
District map

House District 41 contains portions of Montgomery County and Roanoke County. This was an open seat following redistricting.

=== Republican mass meeting ===
==== Nominee ====
- Chris Obenshain, Montgomery County assistant commonwealth's attorney

==== Defeated at meeting ====
- Lowell Bowman, contractor and Republican candidate for HD-7 in 2021

==== Results ====
Virginia's 41st House of Delegates district, 2023 Republican mass meeting
Party	Candidate	Votes	%
Republican	Chris Obenshain	294	58
Republican	Lowell Bowman	213	42
Total votes		507	100.0

=== Democratic primary ===
==== Nominee ====
- Lily Franklin, Chief of Staff for Sam Rasoul

==== Withdrawn ====
- James Harder, Director of CS/root and Democratic nominee for HD-12 in 2013

=== General election ===
Predictions

Source	Ranking	As of
CNalysis	Likely R	September 6, 2023
Elections Daily	Likely R	November 2, 2023

Virginia's 41st House of Delegates District, 2023 general election
Party	Candidate	Votes	%
Republican	Chris Obenshain	12,529	50.31
Democratic	Lily Franklin	12,346	49.57
Write-in		29	0.12
Total votes		24,904	100
Republican win (new seat)			

== District 42 ==
District map

House District 42 contains the entire city of Radford and Giles County, as well as portions of Pulaski County and Montgomery County. The incumbent delegate was Republican Jason Ballard, who was first elected in 2021.

=== Republican Mass meeting ===
==== Nominee ====
- Jason Ballard, incumbent

==== Defeated at meeting ====
- Jody Pyles, marketing and sales consultant

==== Results ====
Virginia's 42nd House of Delegates district, 2023 Republican primary
Party	Candidate	Votes	%
Republican	Jason Ballard (incumbent)	1,041	91.7%
Republican	Jody Pyles	87	8.3%
Total votes		1,128	100

=== General election ===
Predictions

Source	Ranking	As of
CNalysis	Safe R	September 6, 2023
Elections Daily	Safe R	November 2, 2023

Virginia's 42nd House of Delegates District, 2023 general election
Party	Candidate	Votes	%
Republican	Jason Ballard (incumbent)	18,743	92.48
Write-in		1,525	7.52
Total votes		20,268	100
Republican hold			

== District 43 ==
District map

House District 43 contains all of Bland County, Buchanan County, and Tazewell County, as well as portions of Dickenson County and Russell County. The incumbent delegate was Republican Will Morefield, who was first elected in 2009.

=== Republican primary ===
==== Nominee ====
- Will Morefield, incumbent

=== Independents ===
==== Declared ====
- Dave Ratliff

=== General election ===
Predictions

Source	Ranking	As of
CNalysis	Solid R	September 6, 2023
Elections Daily	Safe R	November 2, 2023

Virginia's 43rd House of Delegates District, 2023 general election
Party	Candidate	Votes	%
Republican	Will Morefield (incumbent)	19,016	85.24
Independent	Dave Ratliff	3,211	14.39
Write-in		83	0.37
Total votes		22,310	100
Republican hold			

== District 44 ==
District map

House District 44 contains the entire city of Bristol and Washington County, as well as portions of Russell County. This district had two incumbents following redistricting: Republican Israel O'Quinn, who was first elected in 2011, and Republican Will Wampler, who was first elected in 2019.

=== Republican primary ===
==== Nominee ====
- Israel O'Quinn, incumbent

==== Declined ====
- Will Wampler, incumbent

=== General election ===
Predictions

Source	Ranking	As of
CNalysis	Safe R	September 6, 2023
Elections Daily	Safe R	November 2, 2023

Virginia's 44th House of Delegates District, 2023 general election
Party	Candidate	Votes	%
Republican	Israel O'Quinn (incumbent)	19,367	96.42
Write-in		719	3.58
Total votes		20,086	100
Republican hold			

== District 45 ==
District map

House District 45 contains the entire city of Norton, Lee County, Scott County, and Wise County, as well as portions of Dickenson County. The incumbent delegate was Republican Terry Kilgore, who was first elected in 1993.

=== Republican primary ===
==== Nominee ====
- Terry Kilgore, incumbent

=== General election ===
Predictions

Source	Ranking	As of
CNalysis	Safe R	September 6, 2023

Virginia's 45th House of Delegates District, 2023 general election
Party	Candidate	Votes	%
Republican	Terry Kilgore (incumbent)	14,815	97.67
Write-in		353	2.33
Total votes		15,168	100
Republican hold			

== District 46 ==
District map

House District 46 contains all of Grayson County, Smyth County, and Wythe County, as well as portions of Pulaski County. The incumbent delegate was Republican Jed Arnold, who was first elected in 2023.

=== Republican primary ===
==== Nominee ====
- Jed Arnold, incumbent

==== Declined ====
- Jeff Campbell, former delegate

=== General election ===
Predictions

Source	Ranking	As of
CNalysis	Safe R	September 6, 2023
Elections Daily	Safe R	November 2, 2023

Virginia's 46th House of Delegates District, 2023 general election
Party	Candidate	Votes	%
Republican	Jed Arnold (incumbent)	19,351	95.35
Write-in		943	4.65
Total votes		20,294	100
Republican hold			

== District 47 ==
District map

House District 47 contains the entire city of Galax, Carroll County, Floyd County, and Patrick County, as well as portions of Henry County. This district had two incumbents following redistricting: Republican Marie March, who was first elected in 2021, and Republican Wren Williams, who was also first elected in 2021.

=== Republican primary ===
==== Nominee ====
- Wren Williams, incumbent

==== Eliminated in primary ====
- Marie March, incumbent

==== Endorsements ====
Wren Williams

Statewide officials

- Jason Miyares, 48th attorney general of Virginia (2022-present) and state delegate from the 82nd district (2016-2022)
- Winsome Sears, 42nd lieutenant governor of Virginia (2022-present) and state delegate from the 90th district (2002-2004)

==== Results ====
County and independent city results Williams: 50–60%; 60–70%; 80–90%; March: 60–70%

Virginia's 47th House of Delegates district, 2023 Republican primary
Party	Candidate	Votes	%
Republican	Wren Williams (incumbent)	6,645	66.89%
Republican	Marie March (incumbent)	3,289	33.11%
Total votes		9,934	100.00%

=== Democratic primary ===
- Patty Quesenberry, farmer

=== Independents ===
==== Declared ====
- Jacob Frogel

=== General election ===
Predictions

Source	Ranking	As of
CNalysis	Solid R	September 6, 2023
Elections Daily	Safe R	November 2, 2023

Virginia's 47th House of Delegates District, 2023 general election
Party	Candidate	Votes	%
Republican	Wren Williams (incumbent)	17,268	74.60
Democratic	Patty Quesenberry	5,149	22.24
Independent	Jacob Frogel	617	2.67
Write-in		115	0.50
Total votes		23,149	100
Republican hold			

== District 48 ==
District map

House District 48 contains the entire city of Martinsville, as well as portions of Henry County and Pittsylvania County. The incumbent delegate was Republican Les Adams, who was first elected in 2013.

=== Republican primary ===
==== Nominee ====
- Les Adams, incumbent

=== Democratic primary ===
==== Did not qualify ====
- Chance Trevillian, receptionist and Democratic nominee for HD-16 in 2021

=== General election ===
Predictions

Source	Ranking	As of
CNalysis	Safe R	September 6, 2023
Elections Daily	Safe R	November 2, 2023

Virginia's 48th House of Delegates District, 2023 general election
Party	Candidate	Votes	%
Republican	Les Adams (incumbent)	17,891	96.85
Write-in		582	3.15
Total votes		18,473	100
Republican hold			

== District 49 ==
District map

House District 49 contains the entire city of Danville, as well as portions of Halifax County and Pittsylvania County. This district had two incumbents following redistricting: Republican James E. Edmunds, who was first elected in 2009, and Republican Danny Marshall, who was first elected in 2001. Edmunds was retiring.

=== Republican primary ===
==== Nominee ====
- Danny Marshall, incumbent

==== Declined ====
- James Edmunds, incumbent

=== Democratic primary ===
==== Failed to qualify ====
- Jasmine Lipscomb, U.S. Marine veteran

=== General election ===
Predictions

Source	Ranking	As of
CNalysis	Safe R	September 6, 2023
Elections Daily	Safe R	November 2, 2023

Virginia's 49th House of Delegates District, 2023 general election
Party	Candidate	Votes	%
Republican	Danny Marshall (incumbent)	12,434	93.19
Write-in		909	6.81
Total votes		13,343	100
Republican hold			

== District 50 ==
District map

House District 50 contains all of Charlotte County, Lunenburg County, and Mecklenburg County, as well as portions of Halifax County and Prince Edward County. The incumbent delegate was Republican Tommy Wright who was first elected in 2000.

=== Republican primary ===
==== Nominee ====
- Tommy Wright, incumbent

==== Withdrawn ====
- John Marsden, attorney and former Prince Edward County GOP Chair (remained on primary ballot)

==== Results ====
Virginia's 50th House of Delegates district, 2023 Republican primary
Party	Candidate	Votes	%
Republican	Tommy Wright (incumbent)	1,438	88.11%
Republican	John C. Marsden (withdrawn)	194	11.89%
Total votes		1,632	100.00%

=== Democratic primary ===
==== Nominee ====
- Josh Blakely, director of Transformative Learning and Brock Experiences at Longwood University

=== General election ===
Predictions

Source	Ranking	As of
CNalysis	Solid R	September 6, 2023
Elections Daily	Safe R	November 2, 2023

Virginia's 50th House of Delegates District, 2023 general election
Party	Candidate	Votes	%
Republican	Tommy Wright (incumbent)	15,580	65.93
Democratic	Josh Blakely	8,012	33.91
Write-in		38	0.16
Total votes		23,630	100
Republican hold			

== District 51 ==
District map

House District 51 contains portions of Bedford County, Campbell County, and Pittsylvania County. The incumbent delegate was Republican Matt Fariss, who was first elected in 2011. Fariss, facing felony charges for a hit and run, did not file for the Republican primary, but later filed to run as an independent.

=== Republican primary ===
==== Nominee ====
- Eric Zehr, former Campbell County supervisor

==== Failed to Qualify ====
- Matt Fariss, incumbent

=== Democratic primary ===
==== Nominee ====
- Kimberly Moran

=== Independent ===
==== Declared ====
- Matt Fariss, incumbent

=== General election ===
Predictions

Source	Ranking	As of
CNalysis	Solid R	September 6, 2023
Elections Daily	Safe R	November 2, 2023

Virginia's 51st House of Delegates District, 2023 general election
Party	Candidate	Votes	%
Republican	Eric Zehr	18,934	72.57
Democratic	Kimberly Moran	5,545	21.25
Independent	Matt Fariss (incumbent)	1,574	6.03
Write-in		39	0.15
Total votes		26,092	100
Republican hold			

== District 52 ==
District map

House District 52 contains the entire city of Lynchburg and portions of Campbell County. This district had two incumbents following redistricting: Republican Kathy Byron, who was first elected in 1997, and Republican Wendell Walker, who was first elected in 2019.

=== Republican primary ===
==== Nominee ====
- Wendell Walker, incumbent

==== Declined ====
- Kathy Byron, incumbent

=== Democratic primary ===
==== Nominee ====
- Jennifer Woofter, consultant

=== General election ===
Predictions

Source	Ranking	As of
CNalysis	Solid R	September 6, 2023
Elections Daily	Safe R	November 2, 2023

Virginia's 52nd House of Delegates District, 2023 general election
Party	Candidate	Votes	%
Republican	Wendell Walker (incumbent)	10,574	54.46
Democratic	Jennifer Woofter	8,825	45.45
Write-in		18	0.09
Total votes		19,417	100
Republican hold			

== District 53 ==
District map

House District 53 contains all of Amherst County, as well as portions of Bedford County and Nelson County. This was an open seat following redistricting.

=== Republican convention ===
==== Nominee ====
- Tim Griffin, attorney

==== Defeated at convention ====
- Sarah Mays, activist

==== Results ====
Total vote tallies were not released publicly due to Mays conceding.

=== Democratic primary ===
==== Nominee ====
- Sam Soghor, community activist, Democratic nominee for HD-24 in 2021, and Democratic candidate for the HD-24 special in 2023

=== General election ===
Predictions

Source	Ranking	As of
CNalysis	Solid R	September 6, 2023
Elections Daily	Safe R	November 2, 2023

Virginia's 53rd House of Delegates District, 2023 general election
Party	Candidate	Votes	%
Republican	Tim Griffin	20,843	70.56
Democratic	Sam Soghor	8,586	29.07
Write-in		111	0.38
Total votes		29,540	100
Republican win (new seat)			

== District 54 ==
District map

House District 54 contains the entire city of Charlottesville and portions of Albemarle County. This incumbent was Democrat Sally Hudson, who was first elected in 2019.

=== Democratic primary ===
==== Nominee ====
- Katrina Callsen, Chair of the Albemarle County School Board (2023–present) and Member for Rio Magisterial District (2018–present)

==== Eliminated in primary ====
- Bellamy Brown, U.S. Marine veteran
- Dave Norris, former mayor of Charlottesville (2008–12)

==== Withdrawn ====
- David Brown, former director of the Virginia Department of Health Professions
- Dashad Cooper, social services employee (running for city council)

==== Declined ====
- Sally Hudson, incumbent delegate (running for SD-11)

==== Results ====
Virginia's 54th House of Delegates district, 2023 Democratic primary
Party	Candidate	Votes	%
Democratic	Katrina Callsen	5,847	47.32%
Democratic	Dave Norris	4,118	33.33%
Democratic	Bellamy Brown	2,391	19.35%
Total votes		12,356	100.00%

=== General election ===
Predictions

Source	Ranking	As of
CNalysis	Safe D	September 6, 2023
Elections Daily	Safe D	November 2, 2023

Virginia's 54th House of Delegates District, 2023 general election
Party	Candidate	Votes	%
Democratic	Katrina Callsen	19,852	96.93
Write-in		628	3.07
Total votes		20,480	100
Democratic hold			

== District 55 ==
District map

House District 55 contains portions of Albemarle County, Fluvanna County, Louisa County, and Nelson County. The seat was vacant after incumbent Republican delegate Rob Bell, who was first elected in 2001, resigned to join Virginia Attorney General Jason Miyares's office.

=== Republican primary ===
==== Nominee ====
- Steve Harvey, U.S. Army veteran

==== Withdrawn ====
- Reid Wernig, aerospace engineer

==== Declined ====
- Rob Bell, former delegate

=== Democratic primary ===
==== Nominee ====
- Amy Laufer, former Charlottesville School Board member (2012–19) and Democratic nominee for SD-17 in 2019

==== Eliminated in primary ====
- Kellen Squire, emergency room nurse and Democratic nominee for HD-58 in 2017

==== Results ====
Virginia's 55th House of Delegates district, 2023 Democratic primary
Party	Candidate	Votes	%
Democratic	Amy Laufer	8,340	69.71%
Democratic	Kellen Squire	3,624	30.29%
Total votes		11,964	100.00%

=== General election ===
Predictions

Source	Ranking	As of
CNalysis	Solid D	September 6, 2023
Elections Daily	Safe D	November 2, 2023

Virginia's 55th House of Delegates District, 2023 general election
Party	Candidate	Votes	%
Democratic	Amy Laufer	22,183	61.38
Republican	Steve Harvey	13,915	38.50
Write-in		45	0.12
Total votes		36,143	100
Democratic gain from Republican			

== District 56 ==
District map

House District 56 contains all of Appomattox County, Buckingham County, and Cumberland County, as well as portions of Fluvanna County, Goochland County, Louisa County, and Prince Edward County. The incumbent was Republican John McGuire, first elected in 2017.

=== Republican convention ===
==== Nominee ====
- Tom Garrett, former U.S. representative for VA-5

==== Defeated at convention ====
- Kevin Bailey, attorney
- Jennie Wood, businesswoman

==== Declined ====
- John McGuire, incumbent delegate (running for SD-10)

=== Results ===
Virginia's 56th House of Delegates district, 2023 Republican convention
Candidate	Round 1		Round 2	
Candidate	Votes	%	Votes	%
Tom Garrett	162	36%	262	58%
Kevin Bailey	176	39%	189	42%
Jennie Wood	113	25%	Eliminated	

=== General election ===
Predictions

Source	Ranking	As of
CNalysis	Safe R	September 6, 2023
Elections Daily	Safe R	November 2, 2023

Virginia's 56th House of Delegates District, 2023 general election
Party	Candidate	Votes	%
Republican	Tom Garrett	20,968	89.53
Write-in		2,451	10.47
Total votes		23,419	100
Republican hold			

== District 57 ==
District map

House District 57 contains portions of Goochland County and Henrico County. This was an open seat following redistricting.

The race made national headlines after it was reported that the Democratic nominee, Susanna Gibson, had livestreamed sexual acts with her husband on the website Chaturbate in the past. The Republican Party responded by sending mailers to voters which included still photos of her and her husband clipped from the website, alongside a picture of the couple with their two children. The photos were not explicit, but the quotes from Gibson's videos that accompanied them were.

=== Republican primary ===
==== Nominee ====
- David Owen, businessman

=== Democratic primary ===
==== Nominee ====
- Susanna Gibson, nurse practitioner, healthcare and women's rights advocate

==== Eliminated in primary ====
- Bob Shippee, retired banker, environmental advocate

==== Results ====
Virginia's 57th House of Delegates district, 2023 Democratic primary
Party	Candidate	Votes	%
Democratic	Susanna Gibson	3,181	55.27%
Democratic	Bob Shippee	2,574	44.73%
Total votes		5,755	100.00%

=== General election ===
Predictions

Source	Ranking	As of
CNalysis	Lean R	October 24, 2023
Elections Daily	Lean R	

November 2, 2023

Virginia's 57th House of Delegates District, 2023 general election
Party	Candidate	Votes	%
Republican	David Owen	18,198	50.77%
Democratic	Susanna Gibson	17,483	48.77%
Write-in		165	0.46%
Total votes		35,846	100.00%
Republican win (new seat)			

== District 58 ==
District map

House District 58 contains potions of Henrico County. The incumbent delegate was Democrat Rodney Willett, who was first elected in 2019.

=== Democratic primary ===
==== Nominee ====
- Rodney Willett, incumbent

=== Republican primary ===
==== Nominee ====
- Riley Shaia, fitness instructor

=== General election ===
Predictions

Source	Ranking	As of
CNalysis	Likely D	September 6, 2023
Elections Daily	Lean D	November 2, 2023

Virginia's 58th House of Delegates District, 2023 general election
Party	Candidate	Votes	%
Democratic	Rodney Willett (incumbent)	18,367	54.47
Republican	Riley Shaia	15,317	45.43
Write-in		35	0.10
Total votes		33,719	100
Democratic hold			

== District 59 ==
District map

House District 59 contains portions of Hanover County, Henrico County, and Louisa County. The incumbent delegate was Republican Buddy Fowler, who was first elected in 2013.

=== Republican primary ===
==== Nominee ====
- Buddy Fowler, incumbent

==== Eliminated in primary ====
- Graven Craig, attorney and Republican candidate for HD-56 in 2017
- Philip Strother, attorney

==== Results ====
Virginia's 59th House of Delegates district, 2023 Republican primary
Party	Candidate	Votes	%
Republican	Buddy Fowler (incumbent)	4,100	57.20%
Republican	Graven W. Craig	2,365	32.99%
Republican	Philip Carter Strother	703	9.81%
Total votes		7,168	100.00%

=== Democratic primary ===
==== Nominee ====
- Rachel Levy, teacher and Democratic nominee for HD-55 in 2021

=== General election ===
Predictions

Source	Ranking	As of
CNalysis	Solid R	September 6, 2023
Elections Daily	Safe R	November 2, 2023

Virginia's 59th House of Delegates District, 2023 general election
Party	Candidate	Votes	%
Republican	Buddy Fowler (incumbent)	18,529	58.15
Democratic	Rachel Levy	13,275	41.66
Write-in		59	0.19
Total votes		31,863	100
Republican hold			

== District 60 ==
District map

House District 60 contains portions of Hanover County and New Kent County. The incumbent delegate was Republican Scott Wyatt, who was first elected in 2019.

=== Republican primary ===
==== Nominee ====
- Scott Wyatt, incumbent

=== Democratic primary ===
==== Nominee ====
- Keith Braxton, teacher

=== General election ===
Predictions

Source	Ranking	As of
CNalysis	Solid R	September 6, 2023
Elections Daily	Safe R	November 2, 2023

Virginia's 60th House of Delegates District, 2023 general election
Party	Candidate	Votes	%
Republican	Scott Wyatt (incumbent)	24,395	67.40
Democratic	Keith Braxton	11,735	32.42
Write-in		66	0.18
Total votes		36,196	100
Republican hold			

== District 61 ==
District map

House District 61 contains all of Rappahannock County and portions of Culpeper County and Fauquier County. The incumbent delegate was Republican Michael Webert, who was first elected in 2011.

=== Republican primary ===
==== Nominee ====
- Michael Webert, incumbent

=== Democratic primary ===
==== Nominee ====
- Larry Jackson, Army contractor

=== General election ===
Predictions

Source	Ranking	As of
CNalysis	Solid R	September 6, 2023
Elections Daily	Safe R	November 2, 2023

Virginia's 61st House of Delegates District, 2023 general election
Party	Candidate	Votes	%
Republican	Michael Webert (incumbent)	20,612	65.23
Democratic	Larry Jackson	10,952	34.66
Write-in		33	0.10
Total votes		31,597	100
Republican hold			

== District 62 ==
District map

House District 62 contains all of Greene County and Madison County, as well as portions of Culpeper County and Orange County. The incumbent delegate was Republican Nick Freitas, who was first elected in 2015.

=== Republican primary ===
==== Nominee ====
- Nick Freitas, incumbent

=== Democratic primary ===
==== Nominee ====
- Sara Ratcliffe, consultant and Democratic nominee for HD-58 in 2021

=== General election ===
Predictions

Source	Ranking	As of
CNalysis	Solid R	September 6, 2023
Elections Daily	Safe R	November 2, 2023

Virginia's 62nd House of Delegates District, 2023 general election
Party	Candidate	Votes	%
Republican	Nick Freitas (incumbent)	16,402	61.65
Democratic	Sara Ratcliffe	10,169	38.22
Write-in		33	0.12
Total votes		26,604	100
Republican hold			

== District 63 ==
District map

House District 63 contains portions of Orange County and Spotsylvania County. The incumbent delegate was Republican Philip Scott, who was first elected in 2021.

=== Republican primary ===
==== Nominee ====
- Philip Scott, incumbent

=== General election ===
Predictions

Source	Ranking	As of
CNalysis	Safe R	September 6, 2023
Elections Daily	Safe R	November 2, 2023

Virginia's 63rd House of Delegates District, 2023 general election
Party	Candidate	Votes	%
Republican	Philip Scott (incumbent)	21,645	83.56
Write-in		4,258	16.44
Total votes		25,903	100
Republican hold			

== District 64 ==
District map

House District 64 contains portions of Stafford County. This was an open seat following redistricting,

=== Republican primary ===
==== Nominee ====
- Paul Milde, former Stafford County supervisor and Republican nominee for HD-28 in 2019

=== Democratic primary ===
==== Nominee ====
- Leonard Lacey, bishop

=== General election ===
Predictions

Source	Ranking	As of
CNalysis	Likely R	September 6, 2023
Elections Daily	Likely R	November 2, 2023

Virginia's 64th House of Delegates District, 2023 general election
Party	Candidate	Votes	%
Republican	Paul Milde	15,326	54.32
Democratic	Leonard Lacey	12,778	45.29
Write-in		108	0.38
Total votes		28,212	100
Republican win (new seat)			

== District 65 ==
District map

House District 65 contains the entire city of Fredericksburg and portions of Spotsylvania County and Stafford County. The incumbent was Republican Tara Durant, who was first elected in 2021.

=== Democratic primary ===
==== Nominee ====
- Joshua Cole, former delegate

=== Republican primary ===
==== Nominee ====
- Lee Peters III, lieutenant for the Stafford County sheriff's office

==== Eliminated in primary ====
- Michael Kasey, disability advocate

==== Declined ====
- Tara Durant, incumbent delegate (running for SD-27)

==== Results ====
Virginia's 65th House of Delegates district, 2023 Republican primary
Party	Candidate	Votes	%
Republican	Lee Peters III	4,470	78.93%
Republican	Michael Kasey	1,193	21.07%
Total votes		5,663	100.00%

=== General election ===
Predictions

Source	Ranking	As of
CNalysis	Lean D	October 23, 2023
Elections Daily	Lean D	November 2, 2023

Virginia's 65th House of Delegates District, 2023 general election
Party	Candidate	Votes	%
Democratic	Joshua Cole	15,406	52.84
Republican	Lee Peters III	13,656	46.84
Write-in		92	0.32
Total votes		29,154	100
Democratic gain from Republican			

== District 66 ==
District map

House District 66 contains portions of Caroline County and Spotsylvania County. The incumbent delegate was Republican Bobby Orrock, who was first elected in 1989.

=== Republican primary ===
==== Nominee ====
- Bobby Orrock, incumbent

=== Democratic primary ===
==== Nominee ====
- Mark Lux, teacher

=== General election ===
Predictions

Source	Ranking	As of
CNalysis	Solid R	September 6, 2023
Elections Daily	Safe R	November 2, 2023

Virginia's 66th House of Delegates District, 2023 general election
Party	Candidate	Votes	%
Republican	Bobby Orrock (incumbent)	13,592	55.61
Democratic	Mark Lux	10,786	44.13
Write-in		65	0.27
Total votes		24,443	100
Republican hold			

== District 67 ==
District map

House District 67 contains all of King George County, Lancaster County, Northumberland County, Richmond County, and Westmoreland County, as well as portions of Caroline County. The incumbent delegate was Republican Margaret Ransone, who was first elected in 2011.

=== Republican primary ===
==== Nominee ====
- Hillary Pugh Kent, businesswoman

==== Declined ====
- Margaret Ransone, incumbent Delegate

=== Democratic primary ===
==== Nominee ====
- John Quincy Smith, retired Air Force Senior Historian

=== Independents ===
==== Nominee ====
- Richard Kenski, nonprofit founder

=== General election ===
Predictions

Source	Ranking	As of
CNalysis	Solid R	September 6, 2023
Elections Daily	Safe R	November 2, 2023

Virginia's 67th House of Delegates District, 2023 general election
Party	Candidate	Votes	%
Republican	Hillary Pugh Kent	19,303	64.78
Democratic	John Quincy Smith	9,854	33.07
Independent	Richard Kenski	629	2.11
Write-in		14	0.05
Total votes		29,800	100
Republican hold			

== District 68 ==
District map

House District 68 contains all of Essex County, King & Queen County, King William County, Mathews County, and Middlesex County, as well as portions of Gloucester County. The incumbent delegate was Republican Keith Hodges, who was first elected in 2011.

=== Republican primary ===
==== Nominee ====
- Keith Hodges, incumbent

=== General election ===
Predictions

Source	Ranking	As of
CNalysis	Safe R	September 6, 2023
Elections Daily	Safe R	November 2, 2023

Virginia's 68th House of Delegates District, 2023 general election
Party	Candidate	Votes	%
Republican	Keith Hodges (incumbent)	27,516	96.79
Write-in		913	3.21
Total votes		28,429	100
Republican hold			

== District 69 ==
District map

House District 69 contains portions of the city of Newport News, Gloucester County, James City County, and York County. The incumbent delegate was Democrat Michael Mullin, who was first elected in 2016.

=== Democratic primary ===
==== Withdrawn ====
- Lindsay Fogarty, rare disease advocate

==== Declined ====
- Michael Mullin, incumbent

=== Republican primary ===
==== Nominee ====
- Chad Green, York County supervisor

=== General election ===
Predictions

Source	Ranking	As of
CNalysis	Safe R	September 6, 2023
Elections Daily	Safe R	November 2, 2023

Virginia's 69th House of Delegates District, 2023 general election
Party	Candidate	Votes	%
Republican	Chad Green	23,189	91.27
Write-in		2,218	8.73
Total votes		25,407	100
Republican gain from Democratic			

== District 70 ==
District map

House District 70 contains portions of the city of Newport News. The incumbent delegate was Democrat Shelly Simonds, who was first elected in 2019.

=== Democratic primary ===
==== Nominee ====
- Shelly Simonds, incumbent

=== Republican primary ===
- Matt Waters, advertising consultant and Libertarian nominee for U.S. Senate in 2018

=== Libertarian primary ===
==== Nominee ====
- Michael Bartley, aerospace engineer and nominee for HD-94 in 2019

=== General election ===
Predictions

Source	Ranking	As of
CNalysis	Solid D	September 6, 2023
Elections Daily	Safe D	November 2, 2023

Virginia's 70th House of Delegates District, 2023 general election
Party	Candidate	Votes	%
Democratic	Shelly Simonds (incumbent)	13,836	57.12
Republican	Matt Waters	9,664	39.89
Libertarian	Michael Bartley	674	2.78
Write-in		50	0.21
Total votes		24,224	100
Democratic hold			

== District 71 ==
District map

House District 71 contains all of the city of Williamsburg, as well as portions of James City County and New Kent County. The incumbent delegate was Republican Amanda Batten, who was first elected in 2019.

=== Republican primary ===
==== Nominee ====
- Amanda Batten, incumbent

=== Democratic primary ===
==== Nominee ====
- Jessica Anderson, receptionist

=== General election ===
Predictions

Source	Ranking	As of
CNalysis	Lean R	September 6, 2023
Elections Daily	Likely R	November 2, 2023

Virginia's 71st House of Delegates District, 2023 general election
Party	Candidate	Votes	%
Republican	Amanda Batten (incumbent)	18,152	50.90
Democratic	Jessica Anderson	17,485	49.03
Write-in		22	0.06
Total votes		35,659	100
Republican hold			

== District 72 ==
District map

House District 72 contains all of Amelia County, Nottoway County, and Powhatan County, as well as portions of Chesterfield County. The incumbent delegate was Republican Lee Ware, who was first elected in 1998.

=== Republican primary ===
==== Nominee ====
- Lee Ware, incumbent

=== Democratic primary ===
==== Nominee ====
- Bilal Zoulfikar Raychouni, Powhatan County Public Schools teacher

=== General election ===
Predictions

Source	Ranking	As of
CNalysis	Solid R	September 6, 2023
Elections Daily	Safe R	November 2, 2023

Virginia's 72nd House of Delegates District, 2023 general election
Party	Candidate	Votes	%
Republican	Lee Ware (incumbent)	22,684	68.05
Democratic	Bilal Zoulfikar Raychouni	10,585	31.76
Write-in		64	0.19
Total votes		33,333	100
Republican hold			

== District 73 ==
District map

House District 73 contains portions of Chesterfield County. The incumbent delegate was Republican Roxann Robinson, who was first elected in 2010.

=== Republican primary ===
==== Nominee ====
- Mark Earley Jr., attorney and Republican nominee for HD-68 in 2021

==== Eliminated in primary ====
- Yan Gleyzer, e-cigarette distributor
- Ryan Harter, Chesterfield County School Board member

==== Declined ====
- Roxann Robinson, incumbent

==== Results ====
Virginia's 73rd House of Delegates district, 2023 Republican primary
Party	Candidate	Votes	%
Republican	Mark Earley Jr.	6,285	69.15%
Republican	Ryan Harter	1,885	20.74%
Republican	Yan Gleyzer	919	10.11%
Total votes		9,089	100.00%

=== Democratic primary ===
==== Nominee ====
- Herb Walke, businessman

=== General election ===
Predictions

Source	Ranking	As of
CNalysis	Solid R	September 6, 2023
Elections Daily	Safe R	November 2, 2023

Virginia's 73rd House of Delegates District, 2023 general election
Party	Candidate	Votes	%
Republican	Mark Earley Jr.	19,435	54.41
Democratic	Herb Walke	16,216	45.40
Write-in		67	0.19
Total votes		35,718	100
Republican hold			

== District 74 ==
District map

House District 74 contains the entire city of Colonial Heights and portions of Chesterfield County. The incumbent delegate was Republican Mike Cherry, who was first elected in 2021.

=== Republican primary ===
==== Nominee ====
- Mike Cherry, incumbent

=== Democratic primary ===
==== Failed to qualify ====
- Jessica Rowland, senior analyst

=== General election ===
Predictions

Source	Ranking	As of
CNalysis	Safe R	September 6, 2023
Elections Daily	Safe R	November 2, 2023

Virginia's 74th House of Delegates District, 2023 general election
Party	Candidate	Votes	%
Republican	Mike Cherry (incumbent)	19,418	87.13
Write-in		2,867	12.87
Total votes		22,285	100
Republican hold			

== District 75 ==
District map

House District 75 contains all of the city of Hopewell and portions of Chesterfield County and Prince George County. The incumbent delegate was Republican Carrie Coyner, who was first elected in 2019.

=== Republican primary ===
==== Nominee ====
- Carrie Coyner, incumbent

=== Democratic primary ===
==== Nominee ====
- Stephen Miller-Pitts Jr., U.S. Army veteran and adjunct professor at Virginia State University

=== General election ===
Predictions

Source	Ranking	As of
CNalysis	Likely R	September 6, 2023
Elections Daily	Likely R	November 2, 2023

Virginia's 75th House of Delegates District, 2023 general election
Party	Candidate	Votes	%
Republican	Carrie Coyner (incumbent)	11,042	52.76
Democratic	Stephen Miller-Pitts Jr.	9,831	46.97
Write-in		57	0.27
Total votes		20,930	100
Republican hold			

== District 76 ==
District map

House District 76 contains portions of Chesterfield County. This was an open seat following redistricting.

=== Democratic primary ===
==== Nominee ====
- Debra Gardner, public service employee and Democratic nominee for HD-27 in 2021

=== Republican primary ===
==== Nominee ====
- Duc Truong, businessman

=== General election ===
Predictions

Source	Ranking	As of
CNalysis	Solid D	September 6, 2023
Elections Daily	Safe D	November 2, 2023

Virginia's 76th House of Delegates District, 2023 general election
Party	Candidate	Votes	%
Democratic	Debra Gardner	14,541	63.68
Republican	Duc Truong	8,185	35.84
Write-in		110	0.48
Total votes		22,836	100
Democratic win (new seat)			

== District 77 ==
District map

House District 77 contains portions of the city of Richmond and Chesterfield County. This was an open seat following redistricting.

=== Democratic primary ===
==== Nominee ====
- Michael Jones, Richmond City Council member

=== General election ===
Predictions

Source	Ranking	As of
CNalysis	Safe D	September 6, 2023
Elections Daily	Safe D	November 2, 2023

Virginia's 77th House of Delegates District, 2023 general election
Party	Candidate	Votes	%
Democratic	Michael Jones	18,587	91.05
Write-in		1,826	8.95
Total votes		20,413	100
Democratic win (new seat)			

== District 78 ==
District map

House District 78 contains portions of the city of Richmond. This seat had three incumbents following redistricting. Democrat Dawn Adams, who was first elected in 2017, Democrat Jeff Bourne, who was also first elected in 2017, and Democrat Betsy Carr, who was first elected in 2009.

=== Democratic primary ===
==== Nominee ====
- Betsy Carr, incumbent

==== Declined ====
- Dawn Adams, incumbent
- Jeff Bourne, incumbent

=== General election ===
Predictions

Source	Ranking	As of
CNalysis	Safe D	September 6, 2023
Elections Daily	Safe D	November 2, 2023

Virginia's 78th House of Delegates District, 2023 general election
Party	Candidate	Votes	%
Democratic	Betsy Carr (incumbent)	27,269	94.20
Write-in		1,680	5.80
Total votes		28,949	100
Democratic hold			

== District 79 ==
District map

House District 79 contains portions of the city of Richmond. This was an open seat following redistricting.

=== Democratic primary ===
==== Nominee ====
- Rae Cousins, attorney

==== Eliminated in primary ====
- Ann Lambert, Richmond City Council member
- Richard Walker, mental health professional

==== Results ====
Virginia's 79th House of Delegates district, 2023 Democratic primary
Party	Candidate	Votes	%
Democratic	Rae Cousins	4,362	62.65%
Democratic	Ann Lambert	2,086	29.96%
Democratic	Richard Walker	515	7.40%
Total votes		6,963	100.00%

=== Independents ===
==== Failed to qualify ====
- Eric Sundberg, graphic designer

=== General election ===
Predictions

Source	Ranking	As of
CNalysis	Safe D	September 6, 2023
Elections Daily	Safe D	November 2, 2023

Virginia's 79th House of Delegates District, 2023 general election
Party	Candidate	Votes	%
Democratic	Rae Cousins	20,225	97.51
Write-in		516	2.49
Total votes		20,741	100
Democratic win (new seat)			

== District 80 ==
District map

House District 80 contains portions of Henrico County. This was an open seat as then-incumbent delegate, Democrat Lamont Bagby, who was first elected in 2015, resigned to take office in the state senate after he was specially elected on March 28, 2023, and incumbent Schuyler VanValkenburg was running for SD-16.

=== Democratic primary ===
==== Nominee ====
- Destiny Levere Bolling, communications director for the AFL-CIO

==== Eliminated in primary ====
- John Dantzler, Democratic candidate for HD-74 in 2021

==== Declined ====
- Lamont Bagby, state senator from SD-9
- Schuyler VanValkenburg, incumbent (running for SD-16)

==== Results ====
Virginia's 80th House of Delegates district, 2023 Democratic primary
Party	Candidate	Votes	%
Democratic	Destiny Levere Bolling	5,648	74.32%
Democratic	John Dantzler	1,952	25.68%
Total votes		7,600	100.00%

=== Independents ===
==== Failed to qualify ====
- Michael Pertti Harned

=== General election ===
Predictions

Source	Ranking	As of
CNalysis	Safe D	September 6, 2023
Elections Daily	Safe D	November 2, 2023

Virginia's 80th House of Delegates District, 2023 general election
Party	Candidate	Votes	%
Democratic	Destiny Levere Bolling	20,570	94.98
Write-in		1,088	5.02
Total votes		21,658	100
Democratic hold			

== District 81 ==
District map

House District 81 contains all of Charles City County and portions of Henrico County and Chesterfield County. The incumbent delegate was Democrat Delores McQuinn, who was first elected in 2009.

=== Democratic primary ===
==== Nominee ====
- Delores McQuinn, incumbent

==== Eliminated in primary ====
- Terrence Walker, administrative assistant

==== Results ====
Virginia's 81st House of Delegates district, 2023 Democratic primary
Party	Candidate	Votes	%
Democratic	Delores McQuinn (incumbent)	7,552	82.84%
Democratic	Terrence Walker	1,564	17.16%
Total votes		9,116	100.00%

=== General election ===
Predictions

Source	Ranking	As of
CNalysis	Safe D	September 6, 2023
Elections Daily	Safe D	November 2, 2023

Virginia's 81st House of Delegates District, 2023 general election
Party	Candidate	Votes	%
Democratic	Delores McQuinn (incumbent)	18,355	94.07
Write-in		1,157	5.93
Total votes		19,512	100
Democratic hold			

== District 82 ==
District map

House District 82 contains the entire of the city of Petersburg and Surry County, as well as portions of Dinwiddie County and Prince George County. The incumbent delegate was Republican Kim Taylor, who was first elected in 2021.

=== Republican primary ===
==== Nominee ====
- Kim Taylor, incumbent

=== Democratic primary ===
==== Nominee ====
- Kimberly Pope Adams, auditor

==== Eliminated in primary ====
- Victor McKenzie, nonprofit executive director

==== Failed to qualify ====
- Branden Riley

==== Results ====
Virginia's 82nd House of Delegates district, 2023 Democratic primary
Party	Candidate	Votes	%
Democratic	Kimberly Pope Adams	5,199	60.69%
Democratic	Victor McKenzie	3,368	39.31%
Total votes		8,567	100.00%

=== General election ===
Predictions

Source	Ranking	As of
CNalysis	Tilt R	November 6, 2023
Elections Daily	Lean R	November 2, 2023

Virginia's 82nd House of Delegates District, 2023 general election
Party	Candidate	Votes	%
Republican	Kim Taylor (incumbent)	14,286	50.05
Democratic	Kimberly Pope Adams	14,208	49.78
Write-in		48	0.17
Total votes		28,542	100
Republican hold			

== District 83 ==
District map

House District 83 contains all of the city of Emporia, Brunswick County, Greensville County, Southampton County, and Sussex County, as well as portions of Dinwiddie County and Isle of Wight County. The incumbent delegate was Republican Otto Wachsmann, who was first elected in 2021.

=== Republican primary ===
==== Nominee ====
- Otto Wachsmann, incumbent

=== Democratic primary ===
==== Nominee ====
- Mary Person, elementary school administrator

=== General election ===
Predictions

Source	Ranking	As of
CNalysis	Solid R	September 6, 2023
Elections Daily	Safe R	November 2, 2023

Virginia's 83rd House of Delegates District, 2023 general election
Party	Candidate	Votes	%
Republican	Otto Wachsmann (incumbent)	18,811	58.39
Democratic	Mary Person	13,361	41.47
Write-in		44	0.14
Total votes		32,216	100
Republican hold			

== District 84 ==
District map

House District 84 contains all of the city of Franklin, as well as portions of the city of Suffolk and Isle of Wight County. Following redistricting, this district had two incumbents: Republican Emily Brewer, who was first elected in 2017, and Democrat Nadarius Clark, who was first elected in 2021.

=== Democratic primary ===
==== Nominee ====
- Nadarius Clark, former delegate

==== Eliminated in primary ====
- Michele Joyce, computer scientist and Democratic nominee for HD-64 in 2019

==== Results ====
Virginia's 84th House of Delegates district, 2023 Democratic primary
Party	Candidate	Votes	%
Democratic	Nadarius Clark	4,176	81.72%
Democratic	Michele Joyce	934	18.28%
Total votes		5,110	100.00%

=== Republican primary ===
==== Nominee ====
- Michael Dillender, U.S. Navy veteran and Republican nominee for HD-76 in 2021

==== Eliminated in primary ====
- Rod Thompson, U.S. Navy veteran

==== Declined ====
- Emily Brewer, incumbent delegate (running for SD-17)

==== Results ====
Virginia's 84th House of Delegates district, 2023 Republican primary
Party	Candidate	Votes	%
Republican	Michael Dillender	3,741	67.33%
Republican	Rod Thompson	1,815	32.67%
Total votes		5,556	100.00%

=== General election ===
Predictions

Source	Ranking	As of
CNalysis	Likely D	September 28, 2023
Elections Daily	Lean D	November 2, 2023

Virginia's 84th House of Delegates District, 2023 general election
Party	Candidate	Votes	%
Democratic	Nadarius Clark	15,899	52.99
Republican	Michael Dillender	14,046	46.82
Write-in		58	0.19
Total votes		30,003	100
Democratic gain from Republican			

== District 85 ==
District map

House District 85 contains portions of the city of Newport News. The incumbent delegate was Democrat Cia Price, who was first elected in 2015.

=== Democratic primary ===
==== Nominee ====
- Cia Price, incumbent

=== General election ===
Predictions

Source	Ranking	As of
CNalysis	Safe D	September 6, 2023
Elections Daily	Safe D	November 2, 2023

Virginia's 85th House of Delegates District, 2023 general election
Party	Candidate	Votes	%
Democratic	Cia Price (incumbent)	12,335	89.56
Write-in		1,438	10.44
Total votes		13,773	100
Democratic hold			

== District 86 ==
District map

House District 86 contains the entire city of Poquoson, as well as portions of the city of Hampton and York County. The incumbent delegate was Republican A.C. Cordoza, who was first elected in 2021.

=== Republican primary ===
==== Nominee ====
- A.C. Cordoza, incumbent

=== Democratic primary ===
==== Nominee ====
- Jarris Taylor Jr., director of Hampton University Online

=== General election ===
Predictions

Source	Ranking	As of
CNalysis	Likely R	September 6, 2023
Elections Daily	Safe R	November 2, 2023

Virginia's 86th House of Delegates District, 2023 general election
Party	Candidate	Votes	%
Republican	A.C. Cordoza (incumbent)	14,362	56.35
Democratic	Jarris Taylor Jr.	11,083	43.48
Write-in		44	0.17
Total votes		25,489	100
Republican hold			

== District 87 ==
District map

House District 87 contains portions of the city of Hampton. The incumbent delegate was Democrat Jeion Ward, who was first elected in 2003.

=== Democratic primary ===
==== Nominee ====
- Jeion Ward, incumbent

=== Republican primary ===
==== Nominee ====
- John Chapman, trucking trainer and supervisor

=== General election ===
Predictions

Source	Ranking	As of
CNalysis	Solid D	September 6, 2023
Elections Daily	Safe D	November 2, 2023

Virginia's 87th House of Delegates District, 2023 general election
Party	Candidate	Votes	%
Democratic	Jeion Ward (incumbent)	14,847	77.45
Republican	John Chapman	4,234	22.09
Write-in		89	0.46
Total votes		19,170	100
Democratic hold			

== District 88 ==
District map

House District 88 contains portions of the city of Portsmouth. Following redistricting, this district had two incumbents: Democrat Don Scott, who was first elected in 2019, and Nadarius Clark, who was first elected in 2021.

=== Democratic primary ===
==== Nominee ====
- Don Scott, incumbent

==== Declined ====
- Nadarius Clark, incumbent delegate (running in HD-84)

=== Republican primary ===
==== Nominee ====
- Jim Wright, nonprofit founder

=== General election ===
Predictions

Source	Ranking	As of
CNalysis	Solid D	September 6, 2023
Elections Daily	Safe D	November 2, 2023

Virginia's 88th House of Delegates District, 2023 general election
Party	Candidate	Votes	%
Democratic	Don Scott (incumbent)	12,240	66.34
Republican	Jim Wright	6,145	33.30
Write-in		66	0.36
Total votes		18,451	100
Democratic hold			

== District 89 ==
District map

House District 89 contains portions of the cities of Chesapeake and Suffolk. The incumbent was Democrat Clint Jenkins, who was first elected in 2019.

=== Democratic primary ===
==== Nominee ====
- Karen Lynette Jenkins, Suffolk School Board member

==== Declined ====
- Clint Jenkins, incumbent delegate (running for SD-17)

=== Republican firehouse primary ===
==== Nominee ====
- Baxter Ennis, U.S. Army veteran

==== Defeated in primary ====
- Don Carey, Chesapeake City Council member and former NFL player
- Jason Wooldridge, U.S. Navy veteran

=== Results ===
Virginia's 89th House of Delegates district, 2023 Republican firehouse primary
Candidate	Round 1		Round 2	
Candidate	Votes	%	Votes	%
Baxter Ennis	686	43.5%	814	57.7%
Don Carey	485	30.8%	594	42.3%
Jason Wooldridge	405	25.7%	Eliminated	

=== General election ===
Predictions

Source	Ranking	As of
CNalysis	Lean R	October 8, 2023
Elections Daily	Lean R	November 2, 2023

Virginia's 89th House of Delegates District, 2023 general election
Party	Candidate	Votes	%
Republican	Baxter Ennis	14,739	50.76
Democratic	Karen Lynette Jenkins	14,218	48.97
Write-in		77	0.27
Total votes		29,034	100
Republican gain from Democratic			

== District 90 ==
District map

House District 90 contains portions of the city of Chesapeake. The incumbent delegate was Republican Jay Leftwich, who was first elected in 2013.

=== Republican primary ===
==== Nominee ====
- Jay Leftwich, incumbent

=== Democratic primary ===
==== Nominee ====
- Jeremy Rodden, Chesapeake School Board candidate and chair of Secular Democrats of Virginia

=== General election ===
Predictions

Source	Ranking	As of
CNalysis	Solid R	September 6, 2023
Elections Daily	Safe R	November 2, 2023

Virginia's 90th House of Delegates District, 2023 general election
Party	Candidate	Votes	%
Republican	Jay Leftwich (incumbent)	17,131	63.01
Democratic	Jeremy Rodden	10,000	36.78
Write-in		56	0.21
Total votes		27,187	100
Republican hold			

== District 91 ==
District map

House District 91 contains portions of the cities of Chesapeake and Portsmouth. The incumbent delegate was Democrat Cliff Hayes Jr., who was first elected in 2016.

=== Democratic primary ===
==== Nominee ====
- Cliff Hayes Jr., incumbent

=== Republican primary ===
==== Nominee ====
- Elijah Colon, account manager

==== Withdrawn ====
- Thomas Powell

=== General election ===
Predictions

Source	Ranking	As of
CNalysis	Safe D	September 6, 2023
Elections Daily	Safe D	November 2, 2023

Virginia's 91st House of Delegates District, 2023 general election
Party	Candidate	Votes	%
Democratic	Cliff Hayes Jr. (incumbent)	13,310	70.36
Republican	Elijah Colon	5,547	29.32
Write-in		60	0.32
Total votes		18,917	100
Democratic hold			

== District 92 ==
District map

House District 92 contains portions of the cities of Chesapeake and Norfolk. This was an open seat following redistricting.

=== Democratic primary ===
==== Nominee ====
- Bonita Anthony, executive director and candidate for Norfolk School Board in 2018

==== Eliminated in primary ====
- Kim Sudderth, senior manager

==== Results ====
Virginia's 92nd House of Delegates district, 2023 Democratic primary
Party	Candidate	Votes	%
Democratic	Bonita Anthony	3,014	51.79%
Democratic	Kim Sudderth	2,806	48.21%
Total votes		5,820	100.00%

=== Republican primary ===
==== Nominee ====
- Michael Durig, music teacher and U.S. Navy veteran

=== General election ===
Predictions

Source	Ranking	As of
CNalysis	Solid D	September 6, 2023
Elections Daily	Safe D	November 2, 2023

Virginia's 92nd House of Delegates District, 2023 general election
Party	Candidate	Votes	%
Democratic	Bonita Anthony	11,807	77.81
Republican	Michael Durig	3,313	21.83
Write-in		54	0.36
Total votes		15,174	100
Democratic win (new seat)			

== District 93 ==
District map

House District 93 contains portions of the city of Norfolk. The district had two incumbents following redistricting: Jackie Glass, who was first elected in 2022, and Angelia Williams Graves, who was first elected in 2020.

=== Democratic primary ===
==== Nominee ====
- Jackie Glass, incumbent

==== Declined ====
- Angelia Williams Graves, incumbent (running for SD-21)

=== Republican primary ===
==== Nominee ====
- John Sitka III, U.S. Navy veteran

=== General election ===
Predictions

Source	Ranking	As of
CNalysis	Solid D	September 6, 2023
Elections Daily	Safe D	November 2, 2023

Virginia's 93rd House of Delegates District, 2023 general election
Party	Candidate	Votes	%
Democratic	Jackie Glass (incumbent)	12,460	75.92
Republican	John Sitka III	3,911	23.83
Write-in		40	0.24
Total votes		16,411	100
Democratic hold			

== District 94 ==
District map

House District 94 contains portions of the city of Norfolk. This was an open seat following redistricting.

=== Democratic primary ===
==== Nominee ====
- Phil Hernandez, nonprofit vice president and Democratic nominee for HD-100 in 2019

==== Failed to qualify ====
- Mike Pudhorodsky, activist

=== Republican primary ===
==== Nominee ====
- Andrew Pittman, attorney

==== Eliminated in primary ====
- Amy Chudzinski, attorney
- Kenneth O'Brien, U.S. Navy veteran

==== Failed to qualify ====
- Antonio Respass

==== Results ====
Virginia's 94th House of Delegates district, 2023 Republican primary
Party	Candidate	Votes	%
Republican	Andrew Pittman	1,544	72.45%
Republican	Amy Chudzinski	304	14.27%
Republican	Kenneth O'Brien	283	13.28%
Total votes		2,131	100.00%

=== General election ===
Predictions

Source	Ranking	As of
CNalysis	Solid D	September 6, 2023
Elections Daily	Safe D	November 2, 2023

Virginia's 94th House of Delegates District, 2023 general election
Party	Candidate	Votes	%
Democratic	Phil Hernandez	8,187	55.71
Republican	Andrew Pittman	6,481	44.10
Write-in		28	0.19
Total votes		14,696	100
Democratic win (new seat)			

== District 95 ==
District map

House District 95 contains portions of the cities of Norfolk and Virginia Beach. This was an open seat following redistricting.

=== Democratic primary ===
==== Nominee ====
- Alex Askew, former delegate

==== Eliminated in primary ====
- Rick James

==== Results ====
Virginia's 95th House of Delegates district, 2023 Democratic primary
Party	Candidate	Votes	%
Democratic	Alex Askew	2,461	71.27%
Democratic	Rick James	992	28.73%
Total votes		3,453	100.00%

=== General election ===
Predictions

Source	Ranking	As of
CNalysis	Safe D	September 6, 2023
Elections Daily	Safe D	November 2, 2023

Virginia's 95th House of Delegates District, 2023 general election
Party	Candidate	Votes	%
Democratic	Alex Askew	12,637	88.77
Write-in		1,599	11.23
Total votes		14,236	100
Democratic win (new seat)			

== District 96 ==
District map

House District 96 contains portions of the city of Virginia Beach. The incumbent delegate was Kelly Convirs-Fowler, who was first elected in 2017.

=== Democratic primary ===
==== Nominee ====
- Kelly Convirs-Fowler, incumbent

==== Eliminated in primary ====
- Susan Hippen, U.S. Navy veteran and candidate for SD-7 in 2019
- Brandon Hutchins, U.S. Navy veteran and candidate for Virginia Beach City Council in 2020
- Sean Monteiro, retired U.S. Air Force colonel, realtor, and chair of the Virginia Beach Civilian Review Task Force Committee

==== Results ====
Virginia's 96th House of Delegates district, 2023 Democratic primary
Party	Candidate	Votes	%
Democratic	Kelly Convirs-Fowler (incumbent)	1,201	28.49%
Democratic	Brandon Hutchins	1,088	25.81%
Democratic	Susan Hippen	1,071	25.40%
Democratic	Sean Monteiro	856	20.30%
Total votes		4,216	100.00%

=== Republican primary ===
==== Nominee ====
- Mike Karslake, entrepreneur

=== Independents ===
==== Declared ====
- Nicholas Olenik, businessman

=== General election ===
Predictions

Source	Ranking	As of
CNalysis	Solid D	September 6, 2023
Elections Daily	Safe D	November 2, 2023

Virginia's 96th House of Delegates District, 2023 general election
Party	Candidate	Votes	%
Democratic	Kelly Convirs-Fowler (incumbent)	11,723	55.17
Republican	Mike Karslake	8,749	41.17
Independent	Nicholas Olenik	734	3.45
Write-in		43	0.20
Total votes		21,249	100
Democratic hold			

== District 97 ==
District map

House District 97 contains portions of the city of Virginia Beach. The incumbent delegate was Republican Karen Greenhalgh, who was first elected in 2021.

=== Republican primary ===
==== Nominee ====
- Karen Greenhalgh, incumbent

=== Democratic primary ===
==== Nominee ====
- Michael Feggans, U.S. Air Force veteran

=== General election ===
Predictions

Source	Ranking	As of
CNalysis	Tilt D	November 6, 2023
Elections Daily	Lean R	November 2, 2023

Virginia's 97th House of Delegates District, 2023 general election
Party	Candidate	Votes	%
Democratic	Michael Feggans	12,734	52.37
Republican	Karen Greenhalgh (incumbent)	11,555	47.52
Write-in		28	0.12
Total votes		24,317	100
Democratic gain from Republican			

== District 98 ==
District map

House District 98 contains portions of the city of Virginia Beach. This seat had two incumbents following redistricting: Republican Glenn Davis, who was first elected in 2013, and Republican Barry Knight, who was first elected in 2008.

=== Republican primary ===
==== Nominee ====
- Barry Knight, incumbent

==== Declined ====
- Glenn Davis, incumbent

=== Democratic primary ===
==== Did not qualify ====
- Zachary Coltrain, university student

=== General election ===
Predictions

Source	Ranking	As of
CNalysis	Safe R	September 6, 2023
Elections Daily	Safe R	November 2, 2023

Virginia's 98th House of Delegates District, 2023 general election
Party	Candidate	Votes	%
Republican	Barry Knight (incumbent)	17,426	89.41
Write-in		2,063	10.59
Total votes		19,489	100
Republican hold			

== District 99 ==
District map

House District 99 contains portions of the city of Virginia Beach. The incumbent delegate was Anne Ferrell Tata, who was first elected in 2021.

=== Republican primary ===
==== Nominee ====
- Anne Ferrell Tata, incumbent

=== Democratic primary ===
==== Nominee ====
- Cat Porterfield, journalist

=== General election ===
Predictions

Source	Ranking	As of
CNalysis	Solid R	September 6, 2023
Elections Daily	Safe R	November 2, 2023

Virginia's 99th House of Delegates District, 2023 general election
Party	Candidate	Votes	%
Republican	Anne Ferrell Tata (incumbent)	15,126	57.28
Democratic	Cat Porterfield	11,253	42.61
Write-in		30	0.11
Total votes		26,409	100
Republican hold			

== District 100 ==
District map

House District 100 contains portions of the city of Virginia Beach, as well as all of the Eastern Shore (Accomack County and Northampton County). This district had two incumbents following redistricting: Republican Tim Anderson, who was first elected in 2021, and Republican Robert Bloxom Jr., who was first elected in 2014. However, Anderson announced he would not seek re-election.

=== Republican primary ===
==== Nominee ====
- Robert Bloxom Jr., incumbent

==== Declined ====
- Tim Anderson, incumbent delegate (ran for SD-19)

=== Democratic primary ===
==== Nominee ====
- Charlena Jones, Northampton County School Board member

=== General election ===
Predictions

Source	Ranking	As of
CNalysis	Solid R	September 6, 2023
Elections Daily	Safe R	November 2, 2023

Virginia's 100th House of Delegates District, 2023 general election
Party	Candidate	Votes	%
Republican	Robert Bloxom Jr. (incumbent)	15,685	59.64
Democratic	Charlena Jones	10,581	40.23
Write-in		34	0.13
Total votes		26,300	100
Republican hold			

== See also ==
- 2023 United States state legislative elections
- 2023 Virginia Senate election
- List of Virginia state legislatures
