= Virginia's 39th House of Delegates district =

Virginia legislative district

District map from the 2023 election

Virginia's 39th House of Delegates district elects one of 100 seats in the Virginia House of Delegates, the lower house of the state's bicameral legislature. District 39 represents Franklin County and part of Roanoke County. The seat is currently held by Will Davis.

== District officeholders ==
Years	Delegate	Party	Electoral history
January 12, 1983 – January 14, 1986	Vivian Watts	Democratic	Resigned to serve as Virginia Secretary of Transportation
January 14, 1986 – January 10, 1996	Alan E. Mayer	Democratic	
January 10, 1996 – January 10, 2024	Vivian Watts	Democratic	Originally held office from January 12, 1983 to January 14, 1986
January 10, 2024 – present	Will Davis	Republican	Elected in 2023
