= Josh Thomas (politician) =

American politician from Virginia

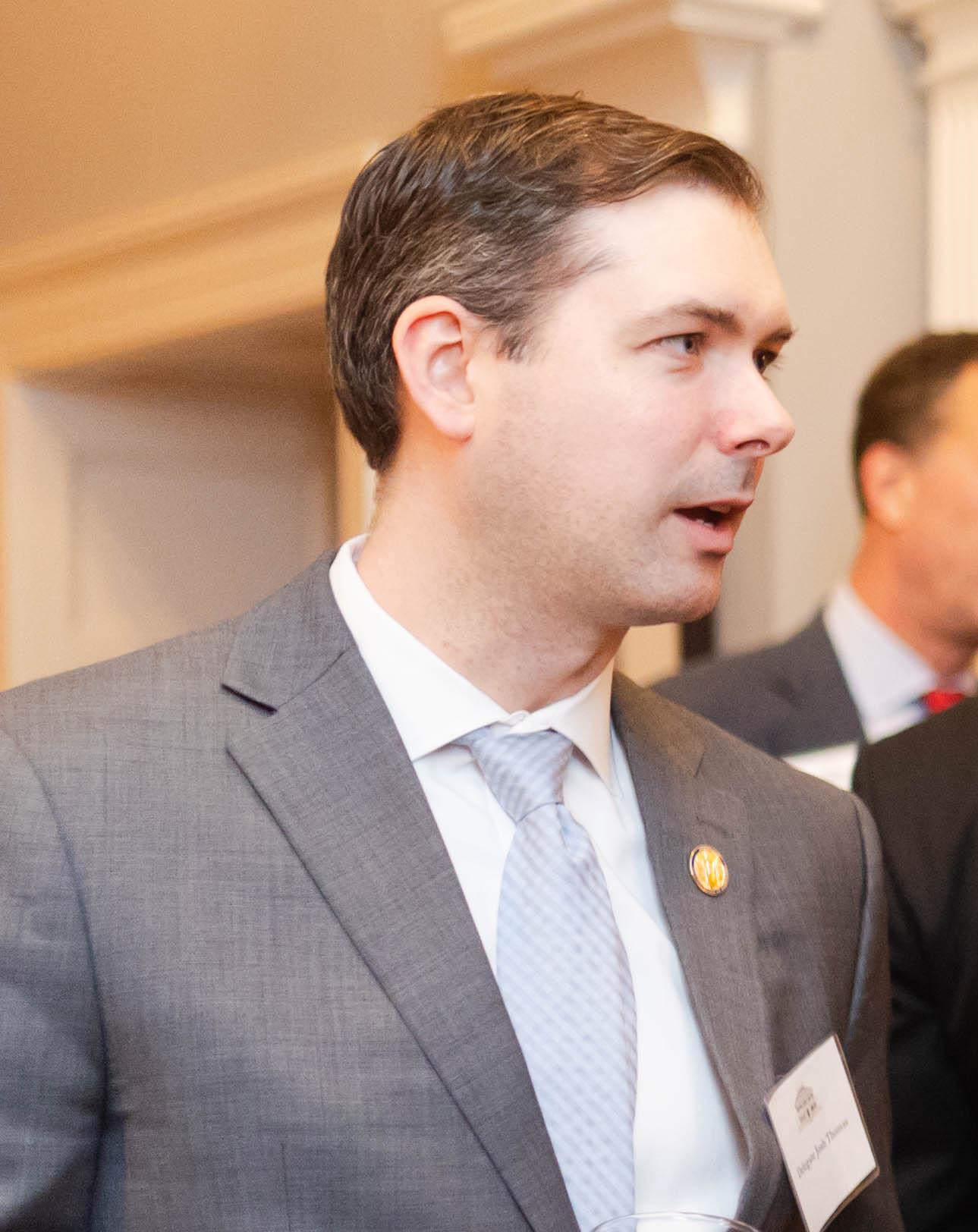

Member of the Virginia House of Delegates from the 21st district
- Incumbent
- Assumed office January 10, 2024
- Preceded by: Kelly Convirs-Fowler (redistricting)
- Constituency: 21st district (2024-present)

Personal details
- Party: Democratic
- Education: Vanderbilt University (BA); College of William & Mary (JD)

Joshua Thomas is an American Democratic politician from Virginia. Thomas is a commercial real estate attorney who served in the U.S. Marine Corps and led tours in Afghanistan. During the COVID-19 pandemic, Thomas joined the Virginia Medical Reserve Corps. He was elected to the Virginia House of Delegates in the 2023 Virginia House of Delegates election from the 21st district. Thomas received his Bachelor's degree from Vanderbilt University and his Juris Doctor degree from the College of William & Mary.
