= Virginia's 69th House of Delegates district =

Virginia legislative district

District map from the 2023 election

Virginia's 69th House of Delegates district elects one of 100 seats in the Virginia House of Delegates, the lower house of the state's bicameral legislature. District 69 represents part of the city of Richmond and part of Chesterfield County. The seat is currently held by Mark Downey.

== District officeholders ==
Years	Delegate	Party	Electoral history
January 12, 1983 – April 14, 2009	Franklin P. Hall	Democratic	Retired; Appointed to the Virginia Alcoholic Beverage Control Board
January 3, 2010 – January 10, 2024	Betsy B. Carr	Democratic	First elected in 2009; Redistricted to the 78th district
January 10, 2024 – January 14, 2026	Chad Green	Republican	First elected in 2023
January 14, 2026 – present	Mark Downey	Democratic	First elected in 2025
