= Mark Downey (politician) =

American politician

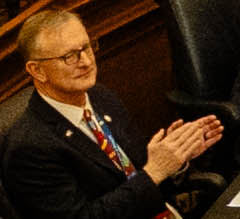

Member of the Virginia House of Delegates from the 69th district
- Incumbent
- Assumed office January 14, 2026
- Preceded by: Chad Green

Personal details
- Party: Democratic
- Education: University of Virginia; Virginia Commonwealth University (MD)
- Website: downeyforva.com

Mark C. Downey is an American politician and physician who was elected as a member of the Virginia House of Delegates in 2025. A member of the Democratic Party, he defeated incumbent Republican Chad Green. Downey continues his pediatric practice with the Children's Hospital of The King's Daughters in the Williamsburg area.

== Early life and education ==
Downey grew up in York County, Virginia, where his family settled after his father retired from the United States Air Force. He graduated from the University of Virginia and the Medical College of Virginia. After completing his medical training in Rochester, New York, he joined his current pediatric practice with the Children's Hospital of The King's Daughters in the Williamsburg area.

== Political career ==
Downey ran for the Virginia House of Delegates in the old 96th District in 2019 and 2021, losing both elections against Republican Amanda Batten.

Downey was elected to the Virginia House of Delegates in 2025. He defeated Republican incumbent Chad Green, who ran unopposed and won with 91.27% in 2023.

The 69th District covers parts of James City County, Gloucester County, York County, and the City of Newport News. Downey is the only doctor in the Virginia General Assembly.
