= Katrina Callsen =

American politician

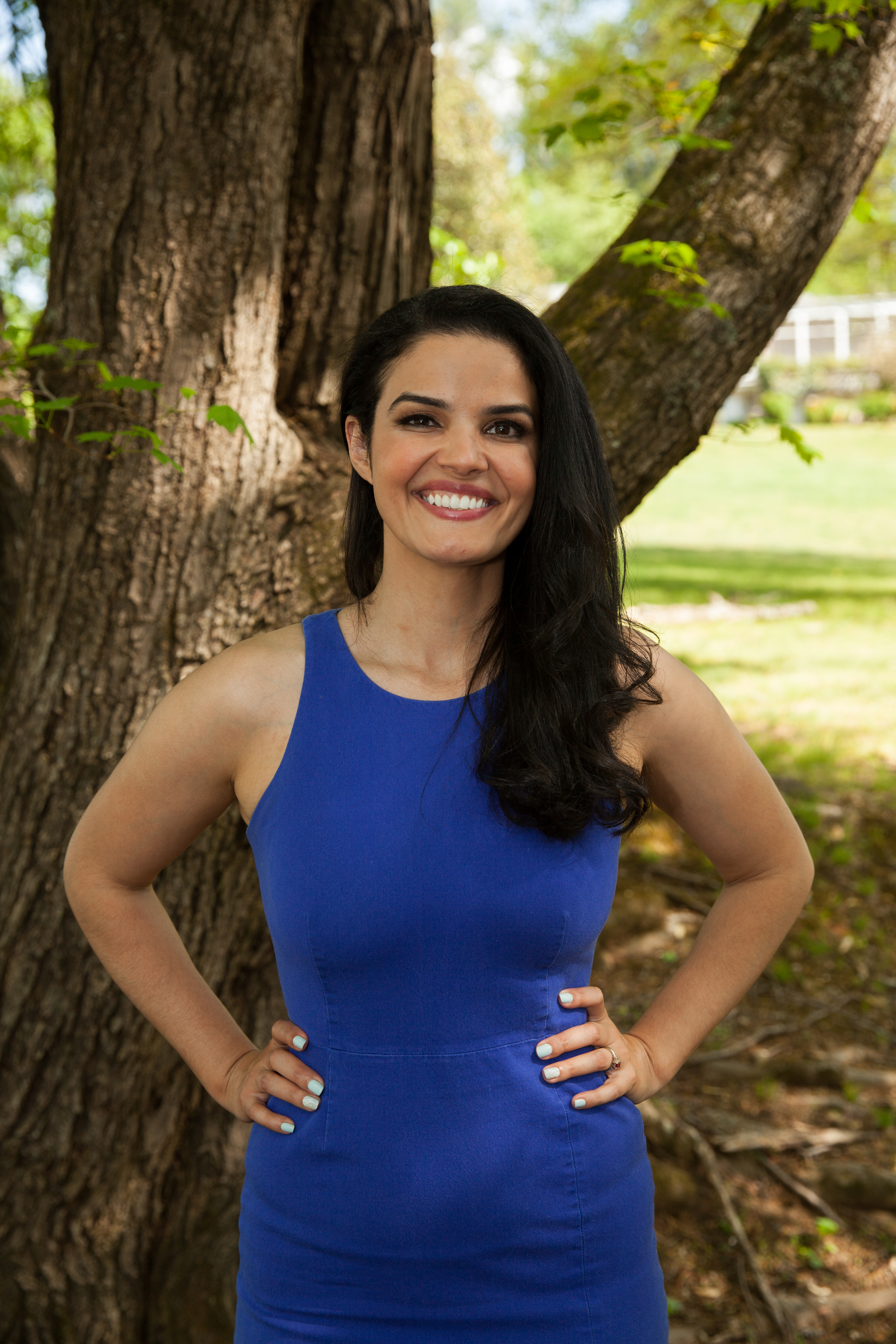

Member of the Virginia House of Delegates from the 54th district
- Incumbent
- Assumed office January 10, 2024
- Preceded by: Bobby Orrock (redistricting)

Personal details
- Born: Schweinfurt, Germany
- Party: Democratic

Katrina Callsen is an American Democratic politician from Virginia. She was elected to the Virginia House of Delegates in the 2023 Virginia House of Delegates election from the 54th district.

She will retain her seat this election as she does not face any opponents.

== Early life ==
Callsen was born to an interracial couple. She graduated from Yale University and University of Virginia School of Law.

== Career ==
A lawyer by profession, she is the former chair of Albemarle County School Board and deputy city attorney for Charlottesville.

== Political views ==
She endorsed the Kamala Harris 2024 presidential campaign.
