= Michelle Lane Smithwick =

American former political appointee

Michelle Lane
- Born: Harford County, Maryland, U.S.
- Occupations: Registered nurse, business owner, author
- Political party: Republican by 2004 and ran in a Republican primary in 2023

Michelle Lane (Smithwick) is a former Maryland public official who released information in the early 2000s about the state's foster care system, which led to investigations toward better monitoring and care of its participants. More specifically, Lane discovered and reported children were neglected and dying while in the Maryland foster care system, and discovered inaccuracies that were being submitted within a federal consent decree court document.

Lane is a registered nurse and a nursing expert witness in multiple states on medical malpractice cases. She owns two businesses and has authored a book with her husband. In 2023, she ran for a Virginia House of Delegates seat, and a position on a Virginia public school board.

== Maryland state government ==
Lane worked in Robert Ehrlich's congressional office and gubernatorial campaign. She was Congressman Grandy’s Assistant on the Healthcare and Social Welfare Committee for the Ehrlich/Steele Transition Team before being appointed to his administration. At her request she went to the Maryland Department of Human Resources (DHR) to resolve the problems noted in the 2002 Legislative Audit showed children being in danger while in state-care. She moved to the Governor's Office of Children, Youth and Families (GOCYF) where she continued overseeing the Fostercare Consent Decree and other issues concerning the problematic Maryland Child Welfare System.

Lane was unanimously voted by the Maryland State Senate to be Governor Ehrlich’s representative on the Citizen’s Review Board for Children which oversees problems in foster care. She also was placed on the Maryland Child Fatality Review Committee. Both committees gave her first-hand knowledge of the perils of Maryland children who were part of the foster care system.

In 2004 she discovered, along with that agency's statistician, that the department was assigning children to foster care social workers who no longer worked for the State of Maryland. This had been suspected by the attorneys for the foster children in the LJ vs Massinga Consent Decree requiring bi-annual reporting in a Federal Consent Decree. Data about the foster children’s health, safety, well-being, familial visits, etc., were included. The children not having state mandated social workers overseeing their care was obviously the reason why children were missing and being killed while in the foster care system.

When she wrote multiple memorandums to the Agency’s Secretary Lane to no avail, she began leaking data and fatality reports from the Consent Decree to Allison Klein of the Baltimore Sun who was writing articles about how children associated with the foster care system have been killed. Lane was fired by the Secretary of DHR, Christopher McCabe in July 2004 after leaked documents disclosing the Special Secretary for the GOCYF, an attorney, deemed the Ehrlich DSS Candidate, Floyd Blair, to not be legally qualified as the Baltimore City DSS Director, as he failed to meet Maryland’s criteria for the minimum credentials necessary to hold that position. She was fired the day after the O’Malley vs Ehrlich lawsuit was heard, and where O’Malley won his lawsuit against Ehrlich. A competent person was necessary as a he/ she would be able to keep children from being killed and from going missing while in the child welfare system.

As a result of Lane's leak, the illegal hire was not installed, but Lane was marched out by armed guards when she was fired. There were temporary positive changes in the foster care system as some of her recommendations were implemented because of a series of Baltimore Sun articles about chronic failures leading to children disappearing, being seriously injured or murdered when they were attached to the Baltimore City division of the Maryland Child Welfare System.

Governor Ehrlich, a Republican, said in 2005 while Ehrlich was in the midst of a scandal that his Aide Joseph Steffen had been spreading rumors about Ehrlich's opponent, Mayor Martin O'Malley who Ehrlich would face-off in the upcoming gubernatorial election, that as a fired former employee, Lane was working with Democrats in a smear campaign against him. Lane, Lane's attorney, the Maryland Democratic Party director all denied the allegations, and House Speaker Michael Bush and Senate President Mike Miller added that she was obviously an important Whistleblower in a troubled and important agency.

In 2006, Maryland Legislature auditors reported that they had found that caseworker staffing numbers had been improperly reported. The auditors also reported failures to investigate child abuse complaints. Legislators said that they would investigate 11 foster child deaths that occurred in 2004.

The state had no knowledge of the whereabouts of at least hundreds of foster children. Lane was honored by the Nurses Association with a display on the Faces of Nursing Calendar for her work on behalf of vulnerable children.

Lane coordinated the Maryland portion of a campaign to encourage John Edwards to run for president in 2008 and worked on his national campaign. She knew Edwards from her work as a nurse expert witness in medical malpractice cases in thirteen states and the District of Columbia. Lane's testimony helped children and adults receive compensation for injuries or for those who died in hospitals.

== Written work ==
- Lane Smithwick, Michelle; Smithwick, Alfred Rogers (2013). Get Your Child Horseback Riding: Without Spending a Fortune. CreateSpace, later merged with Kindle Direct Publishing. ISBN 978-1-4848-6752-5. (vanity publisher)

== Personal life ==
Lane has served in a professorship appointment at Towson University and continues to work as a nursing expert witness in medical malpractice cases helping children through adults receive compensation for injuries or for deaths while in hospitals.

In 1998, she started a home healthcare organization in Maryland called HiTech Infusions, PA, and moved the business to Virginia in 2015, where it is called Middleburg HomeCare, LLC.

In 2021, Lane served on Governor of Virginia Ralph Northam's Workgroup on Personal Care Assistants where her work blocked MoveOn.org from disrupting the Elderly or Disabled With Consumer Direction (EDCD) Medicaid waiver, part of the Commonwealth Coordinated Care (CCC) Plus Waiver since July 2017, which keeps Virginia citizens in their homes and from having to enter nursing homes; according to Workgroup's published minutes.

In the last two weeks before the May 2023 Republican primary for the Virginia House of Delegates, Lane entered the race for district 31 but was unsuccessful. Later that year she was a write-in candidate for Clarke County School Board but was not successful in that seat's bid.

Lane has started a second business, a medical spa called MedSpa of Middleburg, LLC. The spa opens in June 2024.
