= Chad Green (politician) =

American politician from Virginia (born 1969)

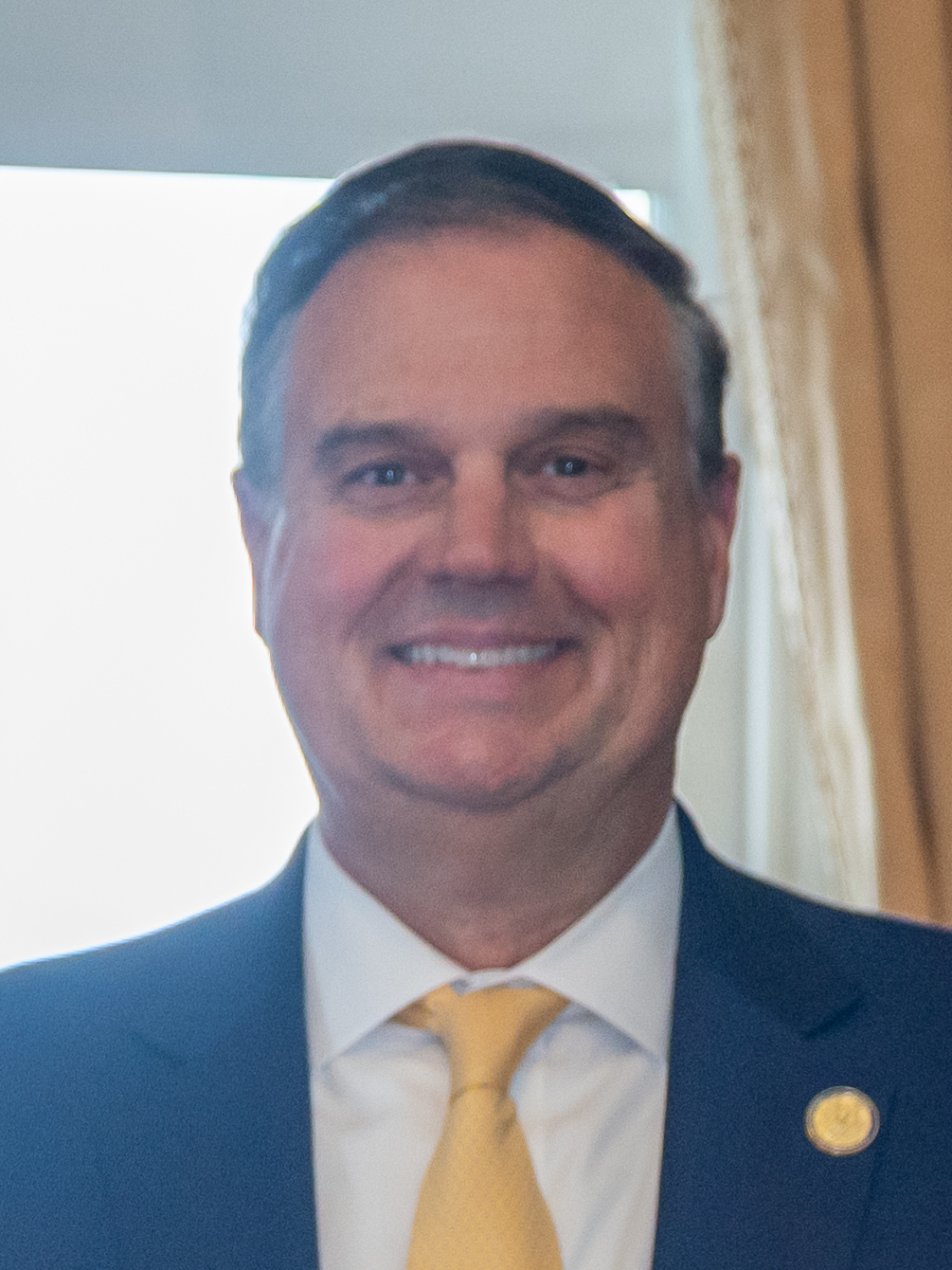
- Green in 2025

York County Board of Supervisors (2016–2024)

Member of the Virginia House of Delegates from the 69th district
- In office January 10, 2024 – January 14, 2026
- Preceded by: Betsy Carr (redistricting)
- Succeeded by: Mark Downey

Personal details
- Party: Republican
- Education: University of Alabama (BA, BS); Samford University (JD)

W. Chad Green Sr. (born June 25, 1969) is an American Republican politician from Virginia. He was elected unopposed to the Virginia House of Delegates in the 2023 Virginia House of Delegates election from the 69th district. The 69th district represents parts of James City County, Gloucester County, York County, and the City of Newport News. Before serving in the Virginia House of Delegates, Green served on the York County Board of Supervisors for eight years. There, he served as Chairman of the Board for two years, and Vice Chairman for one.

In the House of Delegates, Delegate Chad Green serves on the House Committees on Education and Privileges and Elections. Green was the first Republican member of the House of Delegates to pass two bills in the 2024 General Assembly Session.

In 2024, Green was one of five Republican delegates who voted with their Democratic colleagues in support of safeguarding same-sex marriage in Virginia.
