= Rae Cousins =

American politician from Virginia

Member of the Virginia House of Delegates from the 79th district
- Incumbent
- Assumed office January 10, 2024
- Preceded by: Nadarius Clark (redistricting)

Personal details
- Party: Democratic
- Education: College of William and Mary (B.A.), Howard University School of Law (J.D.)
- Profession: Lawyer
- Committees: Courts of Justice; Education; Public Safety

Rae Cousins (born 1979 or 1980) is an American Democratic politician from Virginia. She was elected to the Virginia House of Delegates in the 2023 Virginia House of Delegates election from the 79th district.

Cousins attended the College of William and Mary, graduating with a B.A. in English in 2001, and the Howard University School of Law, graduating with a J.D. in 2010, and was called to the bar in Virginia the following year. Since 2010 she has worked largely in settlement administration for BrownGreer in New Orleans and Richmond, Virginia. A fourth-generation Richmonder, she grew up in Church Hill and lives in Northside with her daughter, Ava Riley.

== 2023 elections ==
Democratic primary results
| Party | Candidate | Votes | % |
|---|---|---|---|
| Democratic | Rae C. Cousins | 4,362 | 62.6 |
| Democratic | Ann-Frances Lambert | 2,086 | 30.0 |
| Democratic | Richard W. Walker | 515 | 7.4 |
| Total votes | | 6,963 | 100.0 |

Virginia's 79th House of Delegates district, 2023
| Party | Candidate | Votes | % |
|---|---|---|---|
| Democratic | Rae C. Cousins | 20,225 | 97.5 |
| Write-in | | 516 | 2.5 |
| Total votes | | 20,741 | 100.0 |
| Democratic hold | | | |
