= Vivian Watts =

American politician (born 1940)

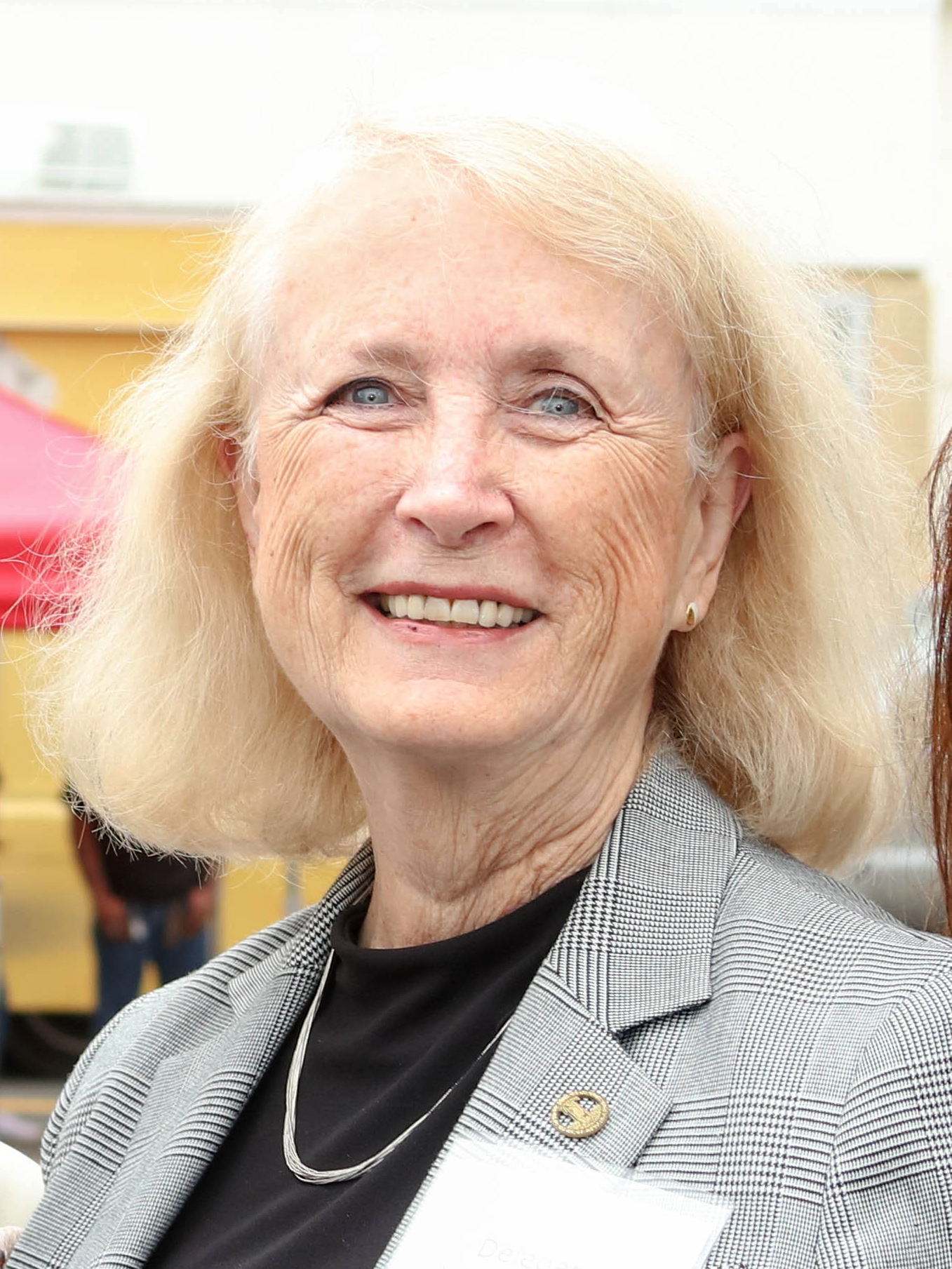
- Watts in 2018

Member of the Virginia House of Delegates
- Incumbent
- Assumed office January 10, 1996
- Preceded by: Alan E. Mayer
- Constituency: 39th district (1996‍–‍2024); 14th district (2024‍–‍present)
- In office January 13, 1982 – January 14, 1986 Serving with Jim Dillard and Robert E. Harris until 1983
- Preceded by: George W. Grayson
- Succeeded by: Alan E. Mayer
- Constituency: 51st district (1982‍–‍1983); 39th district (1983‍–‍1986)

7th Virginia Secretary of Transportation and Public Safety
- In office January 14, 1986 – January 13, 1990
- Governor: Gerald Baliles
- Preceded by: Andrew B. Fogarty
- Succeeded by: John G. Milliken (as Secretary of Transportation); Robert L. Suthard (as Secretary of Public Safety)

Personal details
- Born: June 7, 1940 (age 86) Detroit, Michigan, U.S.
- Party: Democratic
- Spouse: David A. Watts (m. 1960)
- Children: 2
- Education: University of Michigan (BA)
- Committees: Courts of Justice; Finance; Science and Technology
- Website: vivianwatts.com

Vivian Edna Watts (born June 7, 1940) is an American politician and author serving as a member of the Virginia House of Delegates since 1996. A member of the Democratic Party, Watts previously represented the 51st District in 1982 and the 39th District during two separate time periods, 1983 to 1985 and 1996 to 2023. She currently represents the 14th district, which encompasses parts of Annandale, Lincolnia, Ravensworth, and Wakefield. Watts also served as the 7th Virginia Secretary of Transportation and Public Safety from 1986 to 1990.

Between 2009 and 2019, Watts introduced and passed 45 pieces of legislation that became law.

Watts currently serves as the Chair of Finance, Chair of Criminal Law Subcommittee Courts of Justice, and as a member of the Rules Committee and Transportation Committee.

== Career ==
Watts was first elected to the Virginia House of Delegates in 1981 and served from 1982 to 1985. She subsequently served as Virginia's Secretary of Transportation and Public Safety from 1986 to 1990. From 1990 to 1994, she worked with the U.S. Advisory Commission on Intergovernmental Relations and also served as a transportation and finance consultant from 1990 to 1993. She was Executive Director of Fairfax Court Appointed Special Advocates (CASA), a nonprofit serving children involved in abuse and neglect cases, from 1993 to 2000. Watts was reelected to the House of Delegates in 1995, returning to office in 1996 and has served continuously since.

In 2017, Watts became the longest-serving woman ever in the Virginia House of Delegates.

== Legislative issues ==
Watts has focused on progressive tax policies and increased funding for education and transportation.

In 2019, Watts said her top three legislative priorities were to restore transportation funding, restructure and expand mental health services, and make the state's school funding formula more equitable.

== Awards and recognition ==
Watts has been awarded the Virginia Counselors Association Outstanding Legislator Award, Virginia Association of Commonwealth Attorneys “Champion of Justice” Award, League of Women Voters of Virginia Good Governance Award, and the Virginia Interfaith Center "Legislator of the Year" Award.

== Personal life ==
She was born in Detroit, Michigan, but has been a resident of Virginia since 1963, and has four grandchildren. She married her husband, David Watts, in 1960.

Watts has authored two books on public safety and criminal justice through a U.S. Justice Department grant.
