= 2019 Virginia House of Delegates election =

2019 Virginia House of Delegates elections
- November 5, 2019

All 100 seats in the Virginia House of Delegates 51 seats needed for a majority
- Turnout: 42.4% ▼5.2
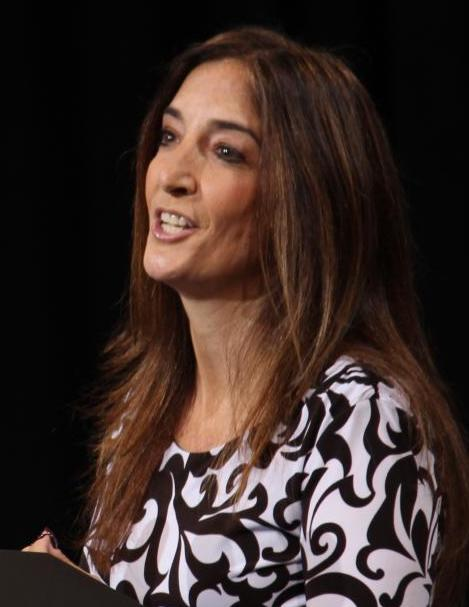

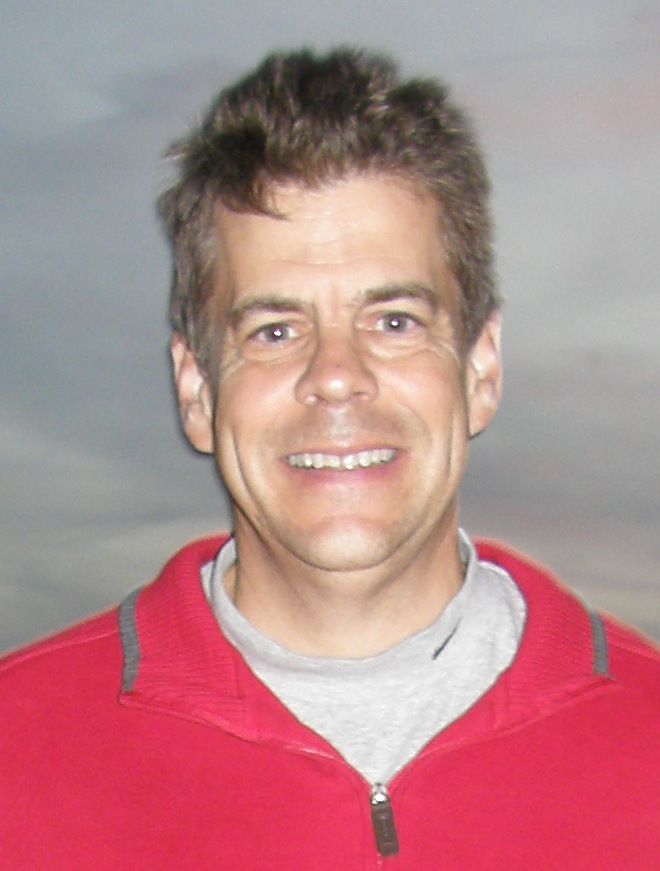
	Majority party	Minority party
Leader	Eileen Filler-Corn	Kirk Cox
Party	Democratic	Republican
Leader since	January 1, 2019	January 10, 2018
Leader's seat	41st	66th
Last election	49	51
Seats won	55	45
Seat change	▲6	▼6
Popular vote	1,200,666	1,002,105
Percentage	52.7%	43.3%
Swing	▼0.4%	▼0.5%
- Results: Democratic hold Democratic gain Republican hold
Speaker before election
Kirk Cox
Republican
Elected Speaker
Eileen Filler-Corn
Democratic

The 2019 Virginia House of Delegates election was held on Tuesday, November 5, 2019, concurrently with the elections for the Senate of Virginia, to elect members to the 161st Virginia General Assembly. All 100 seats in the Virginia House of Delegates were up for election. It resulted in Democrats gaining 6 seats in the House of Delegates, and gaining control of both chambers of the General Assembly, marking the first time that Democrats held control of both legislative and executive branches in Virginia since 1993.

Primary elections were held on June 11, 2019.

== Background ==
In the 2017 Virginia House of Delegates election, Republicans held on to a slim majority of 51-49 after a drawing in a tied race went in their favor. In those elections Democrats gained 15 seats in what was widely considered a rebuke of the presidency of President Donald Trump.

Since the last elections several State House districts were redrawn, following a federal district court decision that struck down 11 districts for racial discrimination. The Republican majority in the House of Delegates appealed the decision directly to the United States Supreme Court. The Supreme Court affirmed the district court's decision in a 5–4 vote, arguing that the House of Delegates lacked standing in the case.

In the aftermath of the 2019 Virginia Beach shooting, Governor Ralph Northam called for a special session of the Virginia Legislature in order for it to consider different gun-control bills. The House of Delegates reconvened on July 9, 2019 only for it to adjourn again after 90 minutes of session. This decision was made on a party-line vote. Northam expressed his disappointment that no gun-control measures were considered. Then-Speaker of the House of Delegates Kirk Cox called the special session "just an election year stunt". He criticized the Democrats' focus on gun-control bills without considering mental health and penalization of crimes.

== Results ==
=== Overview ===
↓
55	45
Democratic	Republican

Parties		Candidates	Seats				Popular Vote		
Parties		Candidates	2017	2019	±	Strength	Vote	%	Change
	Democratic		49	55	+6	55.00%	1,200,666	52.66%	-0.44
	Republican		51	45	-6	45.00%	1,002,105	43.31%	-0.50
	Libertarian		0	0	Steady	0.00%	9,647	0.42%	+0.19
-	Write-ins		0	0	Steady	0.00%	42,902	1.88%	+0.39
	Independent		0	0	Steady	0.00%	24,718	1.08%	Steady
Total			100	100	0	100.00%	2,280,038	100.00%	-

=== Close races ===
Seats where the margin of victory was under 10%:

1. HD District 83, 0.12% gain
2. HD District 27, 0.62%
3. HD District 75, 2.09%
4. HD District 84, 2.41%
5. HD District 85, 3.43%
6. HD District 100, 3.85%
7. HD District 28, 4.04% gain
8. HD District 81, 4.36%
9. HD District 73, 4.53%
10. HD District 66, 4.64%
11. HD District 10, 4.69%
12. HD District 40, 4.8% gain
13. HD District 31, 5.41%
14. HD District 96, 6.13%
15. HD District 72, 6.63%
16. HD District 91, 6.72% gain
17. HD District 50, 6.79%
18. HD District 12, 7.17%
19. HD District 26, 8.14%
20. HD District 51, 9.24%
21. HD District 21, 9.26%
22. HD District 68, 9.33%

== Predictions ==
Source	Ranking	As of
Sabato	Lean D (flip)	October 31, 2019

== Detailed results ==
- Uncontested primaries are not reported by the Virginia Department of Elections.

=== District 1 ===
Incumbent Republican Terry Kilgore has represented the 1st District since 1994.

==== General election ====
Virginia's 1st House of Delegates district, 2019
Party	Candidate	Votes	%
Republican	Terry Kilgore (incumbent)	16,748	95.7
Write-in		754	4.3
Total votes		17,502	100.0
Republican hold			

=== District 2 ===
Incumbent Democrat Jennifer Carroll Foy has represented the 2nd district since 2018.

==== General election ====
Virginia's 2nd House of Delegates district, 2019
Party	Candidate	Votes	%
Democratic	Jennifer Carroll Foy (incumbent)	11,828	60.6
Republican	Heather Mitchell	7,563	38.7
Write-in		139	0.7
Total votes		19,530	100.0
Democratic hold			

=== District 3 ===
Incumbent Republican Will Morefield has represented the 3rd district since 2010.

==== General election ====
Virginia's 3rd House of Delagtes district, 2019
Party	Candidate	Votes	%
Republican	Will Morefield (incumbent)	17,099	98.0
Write-in		343	2.0
Total votes		17,442	100.0
Republican hold			

=== District 4 ===
Incumbent Republican Todd Pillion has represented the 4th district since 2014. He was elected to the 40th Senate District in 2019.

==== Republican primary election ====
Republican primary results
Party	Candidate	Votes	%
Republican	Will Wampler	2,319	64.5
Republican	David Eaton	1,278	35.5
Total votes		3,597	100.0

==== General election ====
Virginia's 4th House of Delegates district, 2019
Party	Candidate	Votes	%
Republican	William Wampler III	14,389	62.9
Democratic	Starla J. Kiser	8,461	37.0
Write-in		21	0.1
Total votes		22,871	100.0
Republican hold			

=== District 5 ===
Incumbent Republican Israel O'Quinn has represented the 5th district since 2012.

==== Republican primary election ====
Republican primary results
Party	Candidate	Votes	%
Republican	Israel O'Quinn (incumbent)	2,449	77.3
Republican	Michael Osborne	721	22.7
Total votes		3,170	100.0

==== General election ====
Virginia's 5th House of Delegates district, 2019
Party	Candidate	Votes	%
Republican	Israel O'Quinn (incumbent)	18,490	97.7
Write-in		444	2.3
Total votes		18,934	100.0
Republican hold			

=== District 6 ===
Incumbent Republican Jeff Campbell has represented the 6th district since 2014 special election.

==== General election ====
Virginia's 6th House of Delegates district, 2019
Party	Candidate	Votes	%
Republican	Jeff Campbell (incumbent)	16,879	76.9
Democratic	James R. "Jim" Barker	5,050	23.0
Write-in		32	0.1
Total votes		21,961	100.0
Republican hold			

=== District 7 ===
Incumbent Republican Nick Rush has represented the 7th district since 2012.

==== General election ====
Virginia's 7th House of Delegates district, 2019
Party	Candidate	Votes	%
Republican	Nick Rush (incumbent)	13,842	66.7
Democratic	Rhonda G. Seltz	6,883	33.2
Write-in		14	0.1
Total votes		20,739	100.0
Republican hold			

=== District 8 ===
Incumbent Republican Joseph McNamara has represented the 8th district since the 2018 special election.

==== General election ====
Virginia's 8th House of Delegates district, 2019
Party	Candidate	Votes	%
Republican	Joseph McNamara (incumbent)	15,195	66.4
Democratic	Darlene W. Lewis	7,673	33.5
Write-in		22	0.1
Total votes		22,890	100.0
Republican hold			

=== District 9 ===
Incumbent Republican Charles Poindexter has represented the 9th district since 2008.

==== General election ====
Virginia's 9th House of Delegates district, 2019
Party	Candidate	Votes	%
Republican	Charles Poindexter (incumbent)	19,040	96.3
Write-in		729	3.7
Total votes		19,769	100.0
Republican hold			

=== District 10 ===
Incumbent Democrat Wendy Gooditis has represented the 10th district since 2016.

==== General election ====
Virginia's 10th House of Delegates district, 2019
Party	Candidate	Votes	%
Democratic	Wendy Gooditis (incumbent)	15,928	52.3
Republican	Randy Minchew	14,500	47.6
Write-in		21	0.1
Total votes		30,449	100.0
Democratic hold			

=== District 11 ===
Incumbent Democrat Sam Rasoul has represented the 11th district since 2014.

==== General election ====
Virginia's 11th House of Delegates district, 2019
Party	Candidate	Votes	%
Democratic	Sam Rasoul (incumbent)	10,269	94.4
Write-in		611	5.6
Total votes		10,880	100.0
Democratic hold			

=== District 12 ===
Incumbent Democrat Chris Hurst has represented the 12th district since 2018.

==== General election ====
Virginia's 12th House of Delegates district, 2019
Party	Candidate	Votes	%
Democratic	Chris Hurst (incumbent)	11,135	53.6
Republican	T. Forrest Hite	9,643	46.4
Write-in		12	0.0
Total votes		20,789	100.0
Democratic hold			

=== District 13 ===
Incumbent Democrat Danica Roem has represented the 13th district since 2018.

==== General election ====
Virginia's 13th House of Delegates district, 2019
Party	Candidate	Votes	%
Democratic	Danica Roem (incumbent)	12,066	55.9
Republican	Kelly Sweeney McGinn	9,468	43.9
Write-in		42	0.2
Total votes		21,576	100.0
Democratic hold			

=== District 14 ===
Incumbent Republican Danny Marshall has represented the 14th district since 2002.

==== General election ====
Virginia's 14th House of Delegates district, 2019
Party	Candidate	Votes	%
Republican	Danny Marshall (incumbent)	12,139	61.3
Democratic	Eric Stamps	7,654	38.6
Write-in		25	0.1
Total votes		19,818	100.0
Republican hold			

=== District 15 ===
Incumbent Republican Todd Gilbert has represented the 15th district since 2006.

==== General election ====
Virginia's 15th House of Delegates district, 2019
Party	Candidate	Votes	%
Republican	Todd Gilbert (incumbent)	18,914	74.4
Democratic	Beverly Harrison	6,493	25.5
Write-in		30	0.1
Total votes		25,437	100.0
Republican hold			

=== District 16 ===
Incumbent Republican Les Adams has represented the 16th district since 2014.

==== General election ====
Virginia's 16th House of Delegates district, 2019
Party	Candidate	Votes	%
Republican	Les Adams (incumbent)	13,146	74.5
Libertarian	Dustin Evans	4,402	25.0
Write-in		83	0.5
Total votes		17,631	100.0
Republican hold			

=== District 17 ===
Incumbent Republican Chris Head has represented the 17th district since 2012.

==== General election ====
Virginia's 17th House of Delegates district, 2019
Party	Candidate	Votes	%
Republican	Chris Head (incumbent)	15,288	93.5
Write-in		1,057	6.5
Total votes		16,345	100.0
Republican hold			

=== District 18 ===
Incumbent Republican Michael Webert has represented the 12th district since 2012.

==== Democratic primary election ====
Democratic primary results
Party	Candidate	Votes	%
Democratic	Laura Galante	1,708	70.1
Democratic	Tristan Shields	729	29.9
Total votes		2,437	100.0

==== General election ====
Virginia's 18th House of Delegates district, 2019
Party	Candidate	Votes	%
Republican	Michael Webert (incumbent)	16,648	60.3
Democratic	Laura Galante	10,727	38.9
Write-in		229	0.8
Total votes		27,604	100.0
Republican hold			

=== District 19 ===
Incumbent Republican Terry Austin has represented the 19th district since 2014.

==== General election ====
Virginia's 19th House of Delegates district, 2019
Party	Candidate	Votes	%
Republican	Terry Austin (incumbent)	19,331	97.0
Write-in		590	3.0
Total votes		19,921	100.0
Republican hold			

=== District 20 ===
Incumbent Republican Richard Bell has represented the 20th district since 2010. He did not seek reelection, and was succeeded by Republican John Avoli.

==== Republican primary election ====
Republican primary results
Party	Candidate	Votes	%
Republican	John Avoli	4,873	60.3
Republican	Dave Bourne	3,214	39.7
Total votes		8,087	100.0

==== General election ====
Virginia's 20th House of Delegates district, 2019
Party	Candidate	Votes	%
Republican	John Avoli	14,707	58.5
Democratic	Jennifer Lewis	10,408	41.4
Write-in		39	0.2
Total votes		25,154	100.0
Republican hold			

=== District 21 ===
Incumbent Democrat Kelly Fowler has represented the 21st district since 2018.

==== General election ====
Virginia's 21st House of Delegates district, 2019
Party	Candidate	Votes	%
Democratic	Kelly Convirs–Fowler (incumbent)	12,402	54.5
Republican	Shannon Kane	10,298	45.3
Write-in		37	0.2
Total votes		22,737	100.0
Democratic hold			

=== District 22 ===
Incumbent Republican Kathy Byron has represented the 22nd district since 1998.

==== General election ====
Virginia's 22nd House of Delegates district, 2019
Party	Candidate	Votes	%
Republican	Kathy Byron (incumbent)	14,390	69.0
Democratic	Jennifer Woofter	6,452	30.9
Write-in		25	0.1
Total votes		20,867	100.0
Republican hold			

=== District 23 ===
Incumbent Republican T. Scott Garrett has represented the 23rd district since 2010. He did not seek reelection, and was succeeded by Republican Wendell Walker.

==== Republican primary election ====
Republican primary results
Party	Candidate	Votes	%
Republican	Wendell Walker	2,486	41.7
Republican	E.J. Turner Perrow Jr.	2,339	39.3
Republican	Ronald Berman	1,133	19.0
Total votes		5,958	100.0

==== General election ====
Virginia's 23rd House of Delegates district, 2019
Party	Candidate	Votes	%
Republican	Wendell Walker	13,529	63.8
Democratic	David Zilles	7,609	35.9
Write-in		53	0.3
Total votes		21,191	100.0
Republican hold			

=== District 24 ===
Incumbent Republican Ronnie R. Campbell has represented the 24th district since a 2019 special election.

==== General election ====
Virginia's 24th House of Delegates district, 2019
Party	Candidate	Votes	%
Republican	Ronnie Campbell (incumbent)	15,653	66.1
Democratic	Christian Worth	7,737	32.6
Independent	Billy Eli Fishpaw	292	1.2
Write-in		18	0.1
Total votes		23,700	100.0
Republican hold			

=== District 25 ===
Incumbent Republican Steve Landes has represented the 25th district since 1996. He did not seek reelection.

==== General election ====
Virginia's 25th House of Delegates district, 2019
Party	Candidate	Votes	%
Republican	Chris Runion	16,747	58.1
Democratic	Jennifer Kitchen	11,517	40.0
Independent	Janice Allen	515	1.8
Write-in		33	0.1
Total votes		28,812	100.0
Republican hold			

=== District 26 ===
Incumbent Republican Tony Wilt has represented the 26th district since a 2010 special election.

==== Democratic primary election ====
Democratic primary results
Party	Candidate	Votes	%
Democratic	Brent Finnegan	1,796	66.3
Democratic	Catherine Copeland	912	33.7
Total votes		2,708	100.0

==== General election ====
Virginia's 26th House of Delegates district, 2019
Party	Candidate	Votes	%
Republican	Tony Wilt (incumbent)	10,273	54.0
Democratic	Brent Finnegan	8,725	45.8
Write-in		31	0.2
Total votes		19,029	100.0
Republican hold			

=== District 27 ===
Incumbent Republican Roxann Robinson has represented the 27th district since a 2010 special election.

==== General election ====
Virginia's 27th House of Delegates district, 2019
Party	Candidate	Votes	%
Republican	Roxann Robinson (incumbent)	15,290	50.3
Democratic	Larry Barnett	15,101	49.6
Write-in		37	0.1
Total votes		30,428	100.0
Republican hold			

=== District 28 ===
Incumbent Republican Bob Thomas has represented the 28th district since 2018. He was defeated in the Republican primary by Paul Milde, who was then defeated in the general election by Democrat Joshua G. Cole.

==== Republican primary election ====
Republican primary results
Party	Candidate	Votes	%
Republican	Paul Milde	2,975	51.2
Republican	Bob Thomas (incumbent)	2,834	48.8
Total votes		5,809	100.0

==== General election ====
Virginia's 28th House of Delegates district, 2019
Party	Candidate	Votes	%
Democratic	Joshua Cole	13,334	51.8
Republican	Paul Milde	12,294	47.8
Write-in		101	0.4
Total votes		25,729	100.0
Democratic gain from Republican			

=== District 29 ===
Incumbent Republican Chris Collins has represented the 29th district since 2016.

==== General election ====
Virginia's 29th House of Delegates district, 2019
Party	Candidate	Votes	%
Republican	Chris Collins (incumbent)	15,532	64.4
Democratic	Irina Khanin	8,583	35.6
Write-in		17	0.1
Total votes		24,132	100.0
Republican hold			

=== District 30 ===
Incumbent Republican Nick Freitas has represented the 30th district since 2016. He ran and won as a write in candidate.

==== General election ====
Virginia's 30th House of Delegates district, 2019
Party	Candidate	Votes	%
Republican	Nick Freitas (incumbent) (write-in)	14,694	56.2
Democratic	Ann Ridgeway	11,011	42.1
Write-ins	Other Write-ins	432	1.7
Total votes		26,137	100.0
Republican hold			

=== District 31 ===
Incumbent Democrat Elizabeth Guzmán has represented the 31st district since 2018.

==== General election ====
Virginia's 31st House of Delegates district, 2019
Party	Candidate	Votes	%
Democratic	Elizabeth Guzmán (incumbent)	14,630	52.6
Republican	Darrell Jordan	13,125	47.2
Write-in		42	0.2
Total votes		27,797	100.9
Democratic hold			

=== District 32 ===
Incumbent Democrat David A. Reid has represented the 32nd district since 2018.

==== General election ====
Virginia's 32nd House of Delegates district, 2019
Party	Candidate	Votes	%
Democratic	David Reid (incumbent)	20,462	92.6
Write-in		1,630	7.4
Total votes		22,092	100.0
Democratic hold			

=== District 33 ===
Incumbent Republican Dave LaRock has represented the 33rd district since 2014.

==== General election ====
Virginia's 33rd House of Delegates district, 2019
Party	Candidate	Votes	%
Republican	Dave LaRock (incumbent)	17,671	56.8
Democratic	Mavis Taintor	13,433	43.1
Write-in		34	0.1
Total votes		31,138	100.0
Republican hold			

=== District 34 ===
Incumbent Democrat Kathleen Murphy has represented the 34th district since the 2015 special election.

==== General election ====
Virginia's 34th House of Delegates district, 2019
Party	Candidate	Votes	%
Democratic	Kathleen Murphy (incumbent)	17,143	58.3
Republican	Gary Pan	12,213	41.6
Write-in		23	0.1
Total votes		29,379	100.0
Democratic hold			

=== District 35 ===
Incumbent Democrat Mark Keam has represented the 35th district since 2010.

==== General election ====
Virginia's 35th House of Delegates district, 2019
Party	Candidate	Votes	%
Democratic	Mark Keam (incumbent)	17,198	92.8
Write-in		1,344	7.2
Total votes		18,542	100.0
Democratic hold			

=== District 36 ===
Incumbent Democrat Kenneth R. Plum has represented the 36th district since 1982.

==== General election ====
Virginia's 36th House of Delegates district, 2019
Party	Candidate	Votes	%
Democratic	Ken Plum (incumbent)	19,558	92.9
Write-in		1,485	7.2
Total votes		21,043	100.0
Democratic hold			

=== District 37 ===
Incumbent Democrat David Bulova has represented the 37th district since 2006.

==== General election ====
Virginia's 37th House of Delegates district, 2019
Party	Candidate	Votes	%
Democratic	David Bulova (incumbent)	14,279	91.9
Write-in		1,260	8.1
Total votes		15,539	100.0
Democratic hold			

=== District 38 ===
Incumbent Democrat Kaye Kory has represented the 38th district since 2010.

==== Democratic primary election ====
Democratic primary results
Party	Candidate	Votes	%
Democratic	Kaye Kory (incumbent)	3,494	63.2
Democratic	Andres Jimenez	2,036	36.8
Total votes		5,530	100.0

==== General election ====
Virginia's 38th House of Delegates district, 2019
Party	Candidate	Votes	%
Democratic	Kaye Kory (incumbent)	13,934	93.3
Write-in		1,007	6.7
Total votes		14,941	100.0
Democratic hold			

=== District 39 ===
Incumbent Democrat Vivian Watts has represented the 39th district since 1996.

==== General election ====
Virginia's 39th House of Delegates district, 2019
Party	Candidate	Votes	%
Democratic	Vivian Watts (incumbent)	15,769	68.4
Republican	Nick O. Bell	7,248	31.4
Write-in		53	0.2
Total votes		23,070	100.0
Democratic hold			

=== District 40 ===
Incumbent Republican and Majority Caucus Chairman Tim Hugo had represented the 40th district since 2003. He was unseated by Democrat Dan Helmer.

==== General election ====
Virginia's 40th House of Delegates district, 2019
Party	Candidate	Votes	%
Democratic	Dan Helmer	15,913	52.3
Republican	Tim Hugo (incumbent)	14,457	47.6
Write-in		34	0.1
Total votes		30,370	100.0
Democratic gain from Republican			

=== District 41 ===
Incumbent Democrat and Minority Leader of the Virginia House of Delegates Eileen Filler-Corn has represented the 41st district since 2010.

==== General election ====
Virginia's 41st House of Delegates district, 2019
Party	Candidate	Votes	%
Democratic	Eileen Filler-Corn (incumbent)	17,312	71.6
Independent	John M. Wolfe	4,571	18.9
Libertarian	Rachel Mace	1,875	7.7
Write-in		429	1.8
Total votes		24,187	100.0
Democratic hold			

=== District 42nd ===
Incumbent Democrat Kathy Tran has represented the 42nd district since 2018.

==== General election ====
Virginia's 42nd House of Delegates district, 2019
Party	Candidate	Votes	%
Democratic	Kathy Tran (incumbent)	16,178	59.7
Republican	Steve Adragna	10,909	40.2
Write-in		30	0.1
Total votes		27,117	100.0
Democratic hold			

=== District 43 ===
Incumbent Democrat Mark Sickles has represented the 43rd district since 2004.

==== General election ====
Virginia's 43rd House of Delegates district, 2019
Party	Candidate	Votes	%
Democratic	Mark Sickles (incumbent)	15,939	77.8
Independent Greens	Gail Parker	4,217	20.6
Write-in		330	1.6
Total votes		20,476	100.0
Democratic hold			

=== District 44 ===
Incumbent Democrat Paul Krizek has represented the 44th district since 2016.

==== General election ====
Virginia's 44th House of Delegates district, 2019
Party	Candidate	Votes	%
Democratic	Paul Krizek (incumbent)	13,726	70.7
Republican	Richard Hayden	5,669	29.2
Write-in		27	0.1
Total votes		19,422	100.0
Democratic hold			

=== District 45 ===
Incumbent Democrat Mark Levine has represented the 45th district since 2016.

==== General election ====
Virginia's 45th House of Delegates district, 2019
Party	Candidate	Votes	%
Democratic	Mark Levine (incumbent)	19,824	91.5
Write-in		1,852	8.5
Total votes		21,676	100.0
Democratic hold			

=== District 46 ===
Incumbent Democrat and Minority Caucus Chair Charniele Herring has represented the 46th district since 2009.

==== General election ====
Virginia's 46th House of Delegates district, 2019
Party	Candidate	Votes	%
Democratic	Charniele Herring (incumbent)	12,287	92.0
Write-in		1,064	8.0
Total votes		13,351	100.0
Democratic hold			

=== District 47 ===
Incumbent Democrat Patrick Hope has represented the 47th district since 2010.

==== General election ====
Virginia's 47th House of Delegates district, 2019
Party	Candidate	Votes	%
Democratic	Patrick Hope (incumbent)	20,860	96.1
Write-in		843	3.9
Total votes		21,703	100.0
Democratic hold			

=== District 48 ===
Incumbent Democrat Rip Sullivan has represented the 48th district since 2014.

==== General election ====
Virginia's 48th House of Delegates district, 2019
Party	Candidate	Votes	%
Democratic	Rip Sullivan (incumbent)	19,762	94.2
Write-in		1,220	5.8
Total votes		20,982	100.0
Democratic hold			

=== District 49 ===
Incumbent Democrat and House Minority Whip Alfonso H. Lopez has represented the 49th district since 2012.

==== Democratic primary election ====
Democratic primary results
Party	Candidate	Votes	%
Democratic	Alfonso Lopez (incumbent)	5,024	77.1
Democratic	Julius Spain	1,489	22.9
Total votes		6,513	100.0

==== General election ====
Virginia's 49th House of Delegates district, 2019
Party	Candidate	Votes	%
Democratic	Alfonso Lopez (incumbent)	13,594	83.4
Independent	Terry Modglin	2,559	15.7
Write-in		140	0.9
Total votes		16,293	100.0
Democratic hold			

=== District 50 ===
Incumbent Democrat Lee J. Carter has represented the 50th district since 2018.

==== Democratic primary election ====
Democratic primary results
Party	Candidate	Votes	%
Democratic	Lee Carter (incumbent)	1,441	57.6
Democratic	Mark Wolfe	1,055	42.2
Write-in		6	0.2
Total votes		2,502	100.0

==== General election ====
Virginia's 50th House of Delegates district, 2019
Party	Candidate	Votes	%
Democratic	Lee Carter (incumbent)	10,701	53.3
Republican	Ian Lovejoy	9,336	46.5
Write-in		55	0.3
Total votes		20,092	100.0
Democratic hold			

=== District 51 ===
Incumbent Democrat Hala Ayala represented the 51st district from 2018 to 2022.

==== General election ====
Virginia's 51st House of Delegates district, 2019
Party	Candidate	Votes	%
Democratic	Hala Ayala (incumbent)	15,508	54.6
Republican	Rich Anderson	12,882	45.3
Write-in		24	0.1
Total votes		28,414	100.0
Democratic hold			

=== District 52 ===
Incumbent Democrat Luke Torian has represented the 52nd district since 2010.

==== Democratic primary election ====
Democratic primary results
Party	Candidate	Votes	%
Democratic	Luke Torian (incumbent)	2,107	76.2
Democratic	Kevin Matthew Wade	654	23.7
Write-in		3	0.1
Total votes		2,764	100.0

==== General election ====
Virginia's 52nd House of Delegates district, 2019
Party	Candidate	Votes	%
Democratic	Luke Torian (incumbent)	11,554	73.0
Republican	Maria Martin	4,208	26.6
Write-in		60	0.38%
Total votes		15,822	100.0
Democratic hold			

=== District 53 ===
Incumbent Democrat Marcus Simon has represented the 53rd district since 2014.

==== General election ====
Virginia's 53rd House of Delegates district, 2019
Party	Candidate	Votes	%
Democratic	Marcus Simon (incumbent)	16,618	93.8
Write-in		1,090	6.2
Total votes		17,708	100.0
Democratic hold			

=== District 54 ===
Incumbent Republican Bobby Orrock has represented the 54th district since 1990.

==== General election ====
Virginia's 54th House of Delegates district, 2019
Party	Candidate	Votes	%
Republican	Bobby Orrock (incumbent)	13,614	58.0
Democratic	Neri Canahui-Ortiz	9,852	41.9
Write-in		27	0.1
Total votes		23,493	100.0
Republican hold			

=== District 55 ===
==== General election ====
Virginia's 55th House of Delegates district, 2019
Party	Candidate	Votes	%
Republican	Buddy Fowler (incumbent)	17,356	60.1
Democratic	Morgan Goodman	11,508	39.8
Write-in		36	0.1
Total votes		28,900	100.0
Republican hold			

=== District 56 ===
Incumbent Republican John McGuire has represented the 56th district since 2018.

==== General election ====
Virginia's 56th House of Delegates district, 2019
Party	Candidate	Votes	%
Republican	John McGuire (incumbent)	20,250	61.0
Democratic	Juanita Matkins	12,929	38.9
Write-in		36	0.1
Total votes		33,215	100.0
Republican hold			

=== District 57 ===
Incumbent Democrat David Toscano has represented the 57th district since 2006. He did not seek reelection.

==== Democratic primary election ====
Democratic primary results
Party	Candidate	Votes	%
Democratic	Sally Hudson	6,150	65.5
Democratic	Kathleen Galvin	3,237	34.5
Total votes		9,387	100.0

==== General election ====
Virginia's 57th House of Delegates district, 2019
Party	Candidate	Votes	%
Democratic	Sally Hudson	21,365	96.1
Write-in		865	3.9
Total votes		22,230	100.0
Democratic hold			

=== District 58 ===
Incumbent Republican Rob Bell has represented the 58th district since 2002.

==== General election ====
Virginia's 58th House of Delegates district, 2019
Party	Candidate	Votes	%
Republican	Rob Bell (incumbent)	18,217	62.5
Democratic	Elizabeth Alcorn	10,922	37.4
Write-in		22	0.1
Total votes		29,161	100.0
Republican hold			

=== District 59 ===
==== General election ====
Virginia's 59th House of Delegates district, 2019
Party	Candidate	Votes	%
Republican	Matt Fariss (incumbent)	16,447	63.2
Democratic	Tim Hickey	9,543	36.7
Write-in		27	0.1
Total votes		26,017	100.0
Republican hold			

=== District 60 ===
==== General election ====
Virginia's 60th House of Delegates district, 2019
Party	Candidate	Votes	%
Republican	James Edmunds (incumbent)	14,461	66.2
Democratic	Janie Zimmerman	7,351	33.7
Write-in		29	0.1
Total votes		21,841	100.0
Republican hold			

=== District 61 ===
==== General election ====
Virginia's 61st House of Delegates district, 2019
Party	Candidate	Votes	%
Republican	Tommy Wright (incumbent)	15,474	66.8
Democratic	Trudy Bell Berry	7,667	33.1
Write-in		33	0.1
Total votes		23,174	100.0
Republican hold			

=== District 62 ===
==== Democratic primary election ====
Democratic primary results
Party	Candidate	Votes	%
Democratic	Lindsey Dougherty	1,833	51.2
Democratic	Tavorise Marks	1,750	48.8
Total votes		3,583	100.0

==== General election ====
Virginia's 62nd House of Delegates district, 2019
Party	Candidate	Votes	%
Republican	Carrie Coyner	13,182	55.1
Democratic	Lindsey Dougherty	10,701	44.7
Write-in		40	0.2
Total votes		23,923	100.0
Republican hold			

=== District 63 ===
==== General election ====
Virginia's 63rd House of Delegates district, 2019
Party	Candidate	Votes	%
Democratic	Lashrecse Aird (incumbent)	12,796	55.0
Independent	Larry Haake	10,291	44.3
Write-in		160	0.7
Total votes		23,247	100.0
Democratic hold			

=== District 64 ===
==== General election ====
Virginia's 64th House of Delegates district, 2019
Party	Candidate	Votes	%
Republican	Emily Brewer (incumbent)	16,181	60.1
Democratic	Michele Joyce	10,704	39.8
Write-in		30	0.1
Total votes		26,915	100.0
Republican hold			

=== District 65 ===
==== General election ====
Virginia's 65th House of Delegates district, 2019
Party	Candidate	Votes	%
Republican	Lee Ware (incumbent)	24,751	65.0
Democratic	Mike Asip	13,273	34.9
Write-in		26	0.1
Total votes		38,050	100.0
Republican hold			

=== District 66 ===
==== General election ====
Virginia's 66th House of Delegates district, 2019
Party	Candidate	Votes	%
Republican	Kirk Cox (incumbent)	14,443	51.7
Democratic	Sheila Bynum-Coleman	13,147	47.0
Independent	Linnard Harris, Sr.	343	1.2
Write-in		19	0.1
Total votes		27,952	100.0
Republican hold			

=== District 67 ===
==== General election ====
Virginia's 67th House of Delegates district, 2019
Party	Candidate	Votes	%
Democratic	Karrie Delaney (incumbent)	16,859	89.3
Write-in		2,011	10.7
Total votes		18,870	100.0
Democratic hold			

=== District 68 ===
==== Republican primary election ====
Republican primary results
Party	Candidate	Votes	%
Republican	Garrison Coward	2,415	74.0
Republican	Lori Losi	847	26.0
Total votes		3,170	100.0

==== General election ====
Virginia's 68th House of Delegates district, 2019
Party	Candidate	Votes	%
Democratic	Dawn Adams (incumbent)	20,897	54.6
Republican	Garrison Coward	17,329	45.3
Write-in		49	0.1
Total votes		38,275	100.0
Democratic hold			

=== District 69 ===
==== General election ====
Virginia's 69th House of Delegates district, 2019
Party	Candidate	Votes	%
Democratic	Betsy Carr (incumbent)	18,935	97.6
Write-in		458	2.4
Total votes		19,393	100.0
Democratic hold			

=== District 70 ===
==== General election ====
Virginia's 70th House of Delegates district, 2019
Party	Candidate	Votes	%
Democratic	Delores McQuinn (incumbent)	19,584	94.7
Write-in		1,105	5.3
Total votes		20,689	100.0
Democratic hold			

=== District 71 ===
==== General election ====
Virginia's 71st House of Delegates district, 2019
Party	Candidate	Votes	%
Democratic	Jeff Bourne (incumbent)	20,311	88.2
Libertarian	Peter Wells	2,637	11.5
Write-in		81	0.3
Total votes		23,029	100.0
Democratic hold			

=== District 72 ===
==== General election ====
Virginia's 72nd House of Delegates district, 2019
Party	Candidate	Votes	%
Democratic	Schuyler VanValkenburg (incumbent)	16,345	53.3
Republican	GayDonna Vandergriff	14,312	46.6
Write-in		33	0.1
Total votes		30,690	100.0
Democratic hold			

=== District 73 ===
==== General election ====
Virginia's 73rd House of Delegates district, 2019
Party	Candidate	Votes	%
Democratic	Rodney Willett	14,893	52.2
Republican	Mary Margaret Kastelberg	13,600	47.7
Write-in		38	0.1
Total votes		28,531	100.0
Democratic hold			

=== District 74 ===
==== General election ====
Virginia's 74th House of Delegates district, 2019
Party	Candidate	Votes	%
Democratic	Lamont Bagby (incumbent)	20,449	95.7
Write-in		925	4.3
Total votes		21,374	100.0
Democratic hold			

=== District 75 ===
==== General election ====
Virginia's 75th House of Delegates district, 2019
Party	Candidate	Votes	%
Democratic	Roslyn Tyler (incumbent)	12,346	51.0
Republican	Otto Wachsmann	11,840	48.9
Write-in		30	0.1
Total votes		24,216	100.0
Democratic hold			

=== District 76 ===
==== General election ====
Virginia's 76th House of Delegates district, 2019
Party	Candidate	Votes	%
Democratic	Clint Jenkins	14,943	56.3
Republican	Chris Jones (incumbent)	11,544	43.5
Write-in		39	0.2
Total votes		26,526	100.0
Democratic gain from Republican			

=== District 77 ===
==== General election ====
Virginia's 77th House of Delegates district, 2019
Party	Candidate	Votes	%
Democratic	Cliff Hayes Jr. (incumbent)	14,108	91.4
Write-in		1,324	8.6
Total votes		15,432	100.0
Democratic hold			

=== District 78 ===
==== General election ====
Virginia's 78th House of Delegates district, 2019
Party	Candidate	Votes	%
Republican	Jay Leftwich (incumbent)	16,648	91.3
Write-in		1,587	8.7
Total votes		18,235	100.0
Republican hold			

=== District 79 ===
==== General election ====
Virginia's 79th House of Delegates district, 2019
Party	Candidate	Votes	%
Democratic	Steve Heretick (incumbent)	9,209	87.4
Write-in		1,325	12.6
Total votes		10,534	100.0
Democratic hold			

=== District 80 ===
==== General election ====
Virginia's 80th House of Delegates district, 2019
Party	Candidate	Votes	%
Democratic	Don Scott	12,027	66.0
Republican	Jim Evans	4,236	23.3
Independent	Ryan Collin Benton	1,930	10.6
Write-in		27	0.1
Total votes		18,220	100.0
Democratic hold			

=== District 81 ===
==== General election ====
Virginia's 81st House of Delegates district, 2019
Party	Candidate	Votes	%
Republican	Barry Knight (incumbent)	11,577	52.1
Democratic	Lenard Myers	10,607	47.8
Write-in		31	0.1
Total votes		22,215	100.0
Republican hold			

=== District 82 ===
==== General election ====
Virginia's 82nd House of Delegates district, 2019
Party	Candidate	Votes	%
Republican	Jason Miyares (incumbent)	15,771	59.2
Democratic	Gayle Johnson	10,840	40.7
Write-in		27	0.1
Total votes		26,638	100.0
Republican hold			

=== District 83 ===
==== General election ====
Virginia's 83rd House of Delegates district, 2019
Party	Candidate	Votes	%
Democratic	Nancy Guy	10,971	50.0
Republican	Chris Stolle (incumbent)	10,944	49.8
Write-in		39	0.2
Total votes		21,954	100.0
Democratic gain from Republican			

=== District 84 ===
==== General election ====
Virginia's 84th House of Delegates district, 2019
Party	Candidate	Votes	%
Republican	Glenn Davis (incumbent)	10,582	51.2
Democratic	Karen Mallard	10,082	48.7
Write-in		27	0.1
Total votes		20,691	100.0
Republican hold			

=== District 85 ===
==== General election ====
Virginia's 85th House of Delegates district, 2019
Party	Candidate	Votes	%
Democratic	Alex Askew	12,079	51.7
Republican	Rocky Holcomb	11,277	48.2
Write-in		33	0.1
Total votes		23,389	100.0
Democratic hold			

=== District 86 ===
==== General election ====
Virginia's 86th House of Delegates district, 2019
Party	Candidate	Votes	%
Democratic	Ibraheem Samirah (incumbent)	14,730	88.9
Write-in		1,836	11.1
Total votes		16,566	100.0
Democratic hold			

=== District 87 ===
==== Democratic primary election ====
Democratic primary results
Party	Candidate	Votes	%
Democratic	Suhas Subramanyam	3,052	47.0
Democratic	Hassan Ahmad	1,502	23.2
Democratic	Johanna Gusman	1,207	18.6
Democratic	Akshay Bhamidipati	701	10.8
Write-in		26	0.4
Total votes		6,488	100.0

==== General election ====
Virginia's 87th House of Delegates district, 2019
Party	Candidate	Votes	%
Democratic	Suhas Subramanyam	17,693	62.0
Republican	Bill Drennan	10,818	37.9
Write-in		25	0.1
Total votes		28,536	100.0
Democratic hold			

=== District 88 ===
==== Democratic primary election ====
Democratic primary results
Party	Candidate	Votes	%
Democratic	Jessica Foster	2,003	74.1
Democratic	Lakecia Evans	699	25.9
Total votes		2,702	100.0

==== General election ====
Virginia's 88th House of Delegates district, 2019
Party	Candidate	Votes	%
Republican	Mark Cole (incumbent)	15,149	55.7
Democratic	Jessica Foster	12,013	44.1
Write-in		49	0.2
Total votes		27,211	100.0
Republican hold			

=== District 89 ===
==== General election ====
Virginia's 89th House of Delegates district, 2019
Party	Candidate	Votes	%
Democratic	Jay Jones (incumbent)	14,398	96.2
Write-in		572	3.8
Total votes		14,970	100.0
Democratic hold			

=== District 90 ===
==== General election ====
Virginia's 90th House of Delegates district, 2019
Party	Candidate	Votes	%
Democratic	Joseph Lindsey (incumbent)	12,584	91.8
Write-in		1,118	8.2
Total votes		13,702	100.0
Democratic hold			

=== District 91 ===
==== Democratic primary election ====
Democratic primary results
Party	Candidate	Votes	%
Democratic	Martha Mugler	2,576	68.7
Democratic	Michael Wade	1,174	31.3
Total votes		3,750	100.0

==== General election ====
Virginia's 91st House of Delegates district, 2019
Party	Candidate	Votes	%
Democratic	Martha Mugler	11,535	54.8
Republican	Colleen Holcomb	9,487	45.0
Write-in		49	0.2
Total votes		21,071	100.0
Democratic gain from Republican			

=== District 92 ===
==== General election ====
Virginia's 92nd House of Delegates district, 2019
Party	Candidate	Votes	%
Democratic	Jeion Ward (incumbent)	15,608	93.5
Write-in		1,083	6.5
Total votes		16,691	100.0
Democratic hold			

=== District 93 ===
==== General election results ====
Virginia's 93rd House of Delegates district, 2019
Party	Candidate	Votes	%
Democratic	Michael Mullin (incumbent)	14,348	55.7
Republican	Heather Cordasco	11,402	44.2
Write-in		28	0.1
Total votes		25,778	100.0
Democratic hold			

=== District 94 ===
==== General election ====
Virginia's 94th House of Delegates district, 2019
Party	Candidate	Votes	%
Democratic	Shelly Simonds	11,563	57.7
Republican	David Yancey (incumbent)	8,070	40.3
Libertarian	Michael Bartley	376	1.9
Write-in		25	0.1
Total votes		20,034	100.0
Democratic gain from Republican			

=== District 95 ===
==== General election ====
Virginia's 95th House of Delegates district, 2019
Party	Candidate	Votes	%
Democratic	Cia Price (incumbent)	11,847	90.2
Write-in		1,284	9.8
Total votes		13,131	100.0
Democratic hold			

=== District 96 ===
==== Republican primary election ====
Republican primary results
Party	Candidate	Votes	%
Republican	Amanda Batten	3,074	61.6
Republican	Melanie Beale	1,916	38.4
Total votes		4,990	100.0

==== Democratic primary election ====
Democratic primary results
Party	Candidate	Votes	%
Democratic	Mark Downey	2,369	53.7
Democratic	Rebecca Leser	1,215	27.5
Democratic	Christopher Mayfield	828	18.8
Total votes		4,412	100.0

==== General election ====
Virginia's 96th House of Delegates district, 2019
Party	Candidate	Votes	%
Republican	Amanda Batten	17,142	52.5
Democratic	Mark Downey	15,141	46.3
Libertarian	James Jobe	357	1.1
Write-in		26	0.1
Total votes		32,666	100.0
Republican hold			

=== District 97 ===
==== General election ====
Virginia's 97th House of Delegates district, 2019
Party	Candidate	Votes	%
Republican	Scott Wyatt	18,279	55.7
Democratic	Kevin Washington	8,717	26.6
Write-in		5,803	17.7
Total votes		32,799	100.0
Republican hold			

=== District 98 ===
==== General election ====
Virginia's 98th House of Delegates district, 2019
Party	Candidate	Votes	%
Republican	Keith Hodges (incumbent)	18,703	68.9
Democratic	Ella Webster	8,399	31.0
Write-in		34	0.1
Total votes		27,136	100.0
Republican hold			

=== District 99 ===
==== General election ====
Virginia's 99th House of Delegates district, 2019
Party	Candidate	Votes	%
Republican	Margaret Ransone (incumbent)	17,701	62.4
Democratic	Francis Edwards	10,631	37.5
Write-in		20	0.1
Total votes		28,352	100.0
Republican hold			

=== District 100 ===
==== General election ====
Virginia's 100th House of Delegates district, 2019
Party	Candidate	Votes	%
Republican	Robert Bloxom Jr. (incumbent)	11,869	51.9
Democratic	Phil Hernandez	10,988	48.0
Write-in		15	0.1
Total votes		22,872	100.0
Republican hold			

== See also ==
- 2019 Virginia Senate election
- 2019 Virginia elections
- List of Virginia state legislatures
