= William K. Barlow =

American politician (1936–2022)

Member of the Virginia House of Delegates from the 64th district
- In office January 8, 1992 – January 11, 2012
- Preceded by: C. Hardaway Marks
- Succeeded by: Rick Morris

Personal details
- Born: William Kyle Barlow; March 13, 1936 Isle of Wight County, Virginia, U.S.
- Died: September 21, 2022 (aged 86) Smithfield, Virginia, U.S.
- Party: Democratic
- Spouse: Ann Taylor Rowell
- Children: Kyle, Amy, Todd
- Education: Virginia Tech (BS); University of Virginia (LLB)
- Occupation: Lawyer; politician

Military service
- Branch/service: United States Air Force
- Years of service: 1958–1962

William Kyle Barlow (March 13, 1936 – September 21, 2022) was an American politician and lawyer who was a Democratic Party member of the Virginia House of Delegates, representing the 64th District from 1992 to 2012. Barlow lost his bid for an 11th term to Republican Richard L. Morris in the November 8, 2011, elections, 55% to 44%.

== Life and career ==
William Kyle Barlow was born on March 13, 1936, on Oak Crest Farm in Isle of Wight County, Virginia. He graduated from Smithfield High School in 1954 where he was a captain of the football, basketball, and baseball teams. He earned a bachelor's degree in agricultural economics from Virginia Tech where he served as the Regimental Commander of the Corps of Cadets and President of the Class of 1958.

After graduating from college, Barlow served for four years as an intelligence officer in the United States Air Force during the Cold War including a tour of duty in Taiwan. After leaving the Air Force he earned a law degree from the University of Virginia Law School in 1965, and returned to Smithfield where he practiced law for more than half a century.

Barlow introduced bills for electoral reform in Virginia, including instant runoff voting, none of which became law. During his long legislative career Barlow was a strong advocate for agriculture and public education.

Barlow died of pancreatic cancer at his home in Smithfield, on September 22, 2022, at the age of 86.
