= Paul Milde (politician) =

American politician (born 1967)

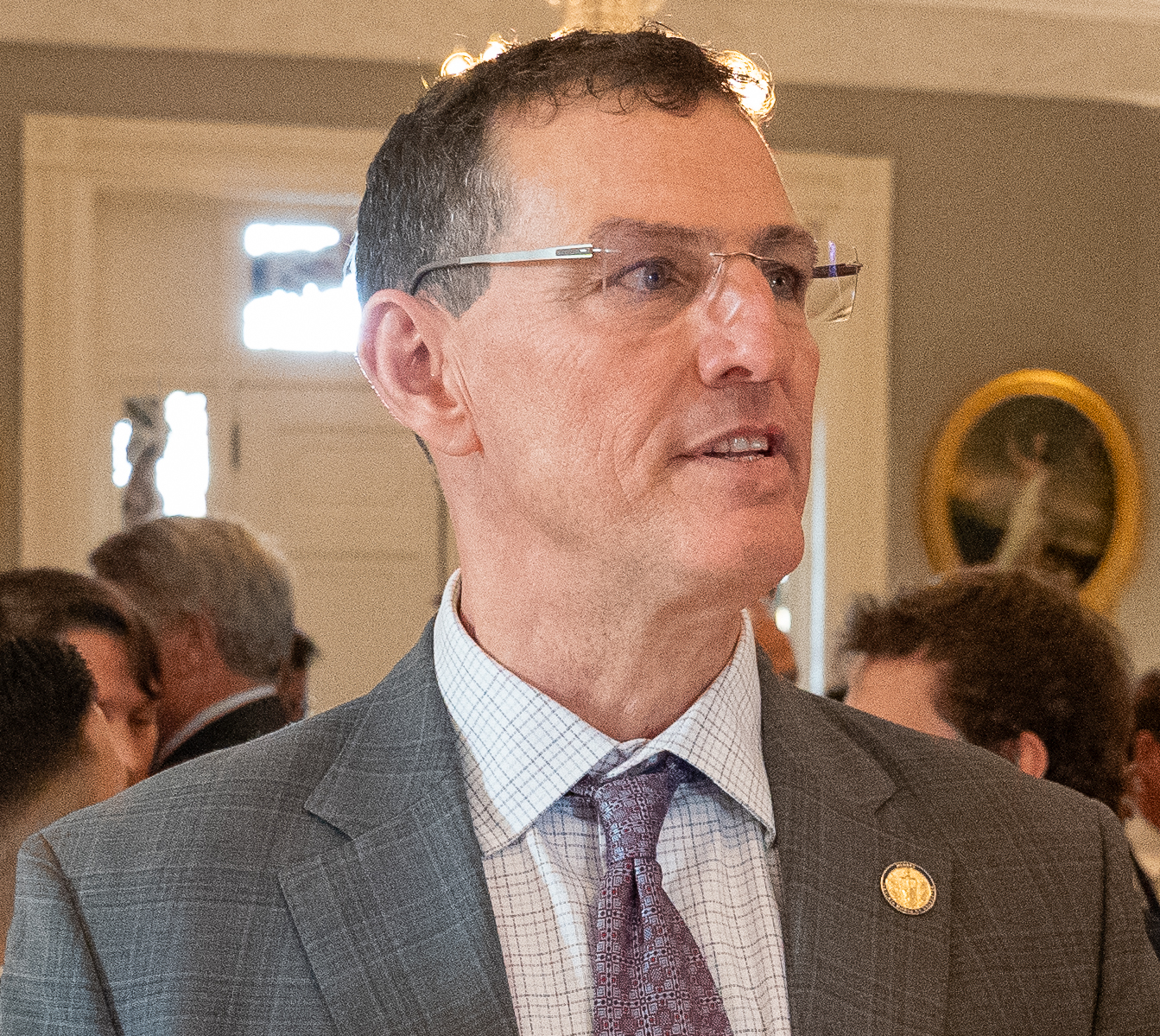
- Milde in 2024

Member of the Virginia House of Delegates from the 64th district
- In office January 10, 2024 – January 14, 2026
- Preceded by: Emily Brewer (redistricting)
- Succeeded by: Stacey Carroll

Personal details
- Party: Republican

Paul Vincent Milde III (born 1967) is an American politician who served as a Virginia State Delegate from 2024 to 2026. A Republican, he was elected to serve as the delegate of Virginia's 64th district in the 2023 Virginia House of Delegates election. He lost re-election in 2025 to Democrat Stacey Carroll.

== Career ==
=== Stafford Board of Supervisors ===
From 2006 to 2017, Milde served as the supervisor of the Aquia district on the Stafford County Board of Supervisors. Milde was first elected to the Board of Supervisors in 2005, defeating the incumbent, Kandy A. Hilliard. Milde remained in the position until 2017 when he declined to run again for supervisor, instead running for the Virginia House of Delegates to represent Virginia's 28th district. Milde lost the Republican primary to Bob Thomas.

Milde ran again for the Aquia district supervisor in 2021. Although he defeated the Republican incumbent, Cindy Charlene Shelton, in the Republican primary, he lost the general election to independent candidate Monica Lynn Gary.

=== Virginia House of Delegates ===
Milde ran as a Republican candidate for the Virginia House of Delegates in 2017, losing the Republican primary to Bob Thomas. Thomas subsequently won the general election and served as the delegate for Virginia's 28th district from 2018 to 2020.

In an upset election, Milde defeated Thomas in the 2019 Republican primary to be party's nominee for the 28th district. Milde continued to the general election but lost to Democratic candidate Joshua G. Cole.

In November 2022, Milde announced he would run again for the House of Delegates in the recently redistricted 64th district. The Republican primary for the race was cancelled as Milde had no qualified opponents. Milde defeated Democratic candidate Leonard Lacey in the general election.

== Personal life ==
Milde has resided in Stafford County since 1989, where he lives with his wife and three children. Milde is an avid scuba diver, certified by the National Association of Underwater Instructors, and is a licensed pilot.

=== Legal issues ===
In 1986, at the age of 18, Milde was convicted of possession of cocaine with intent to distribute, a felony, in Prince William County, being sentenced to six years in prison with five suspended. In 1995, he pleaded guilty to attempted burglary as an accessory after the fact, a misdemeanor, and was sentenced to 360 days in prison with 340 days suspended. Milde's criminal convictions emerged during his initial 2005 campaign for Stafford County Board of Supervisors, where Milde was criticized by Stafford County Republican activists for not previously disclosing the existence of the convictions. Milde claimed the knowledge and support of William J. Howell, then-Speaker of the Virginia House of Delegates, and of Robert Hunt, then-member of the Stafford County School Board for Aquia, although Hunt declined to explicitly support Milde in an interview with The Washington Post.

During his 2019 primary campaign against Bob Thomas for the House of Delegates, Milde's criminal history once again emerged, with the Thomas campaign attacking Milde as a "trainwreck." Milde publicly claimed that the burglary conviction came from failing to disclose a confession made to him by a Narcotics Anonymous member to the police, a claim at odds with his then-fiancée's sworn testimony in 1994 that Milde had been an active participant. Milde explained the cocaine conviction but not the burglary conviction in a campaign statement and attacked Thomas for "voting with the Democrats to advance their liberal agenda."
