= Tim Griffin (Virginia politician) =

American politician from Virginia

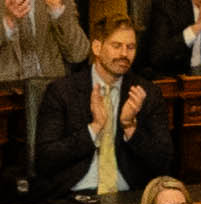

Member of the Virginia House of Delegates from the 53rd district
- Incumbent
- Assumed office January 10, 2024
- Preceded by: Marcus Simon (redistricting)

Personal details
- Party: Republican

Tim Griffin is an American Republican politician from Virginia. He was elected to the Virginia House of Delegates in the 2023 Virginia House of Delegates election from the 53rd district.

Griffin is an election attorney and former prosecutor.
