= Mitchell Van Yahres =

American politician

- Van Yahres in 2002

Member of the Virginia House of Delegates
- In office January 14, 1981 – January 11, 2006
- Preceded by: Tom Michie
- Succeeded by: David Toscano
- Constituency: 26th district (1981‍–‍1982); 24th district (1982‍–‍1983); 57th district (1983‍–‍2006)

Mayor of Charlottesville, Virginia
- In office September 1, 1970 – July 3, 1972
- Preceded by: Dutch Vogt
- Succeeded by: Francis Fife

Personal details
- Born: Mitchell Van Yahres; October 21, 1926 Mineola, New York, U.S.
- Died: February 8, 2008 (aged 81) Charlottesville, Virginia, U.S.
- Party: Democratic
- Spouse: Elizabeth Louise Franklin
- Education: Cornell University (BS)
- Occupation: Arborist; politician; consultant

Military service
- Branch/service: United States Army; Army Air Forces
- Years of service: 1944–1945
- Battles/wars: World War II

Mitchell Van Yahres (October 21, 1926 – February 8, 2008) was an American politician. A Democrat, he was mayor of Charlottesville, Virginia from 1970 to 1972, and served in the Virginia House of Delegates from 1981 to 2005.

== Political career ==
Born in Mineola, New York, Van Yahres served in the United States Army Air Forces at the end of World War II. After the war, he attended Cornell University, graduating in 1949. He then moved to Charlottesville, where he began work as an arborist. He became interested in local politics, and ran for a seat on Charlottesville's City Council. He won, becoming the only Democrat on the then-Republican dominated board. Van Yahres served as a city councilman for eight years. For two of those years, from 1970 to 1972, he was mayor of the City of Charlottesville. During his tenure as mayor, he led the initiative to close East Main Street to automobile traffic and convert much of the heart of the city's business district into the Downtown Mall. Today, the pedestrian mall serves as a major cultural hub for much of Central Virginia.

In 1980, Delegate Thomas J. Michie Jr. won a special election to the Virginia State Senate. Van Yahres won the subsequent special election to fill the vacancy created by Michie's victory. He served in the Virginia General Assembly, representing the City of Charlottesville and a small portion of Albemarle County.

He served as a liberal voice for his constituency in a forum dominated by Republicans after 1999. Van Yahres, however, did not enjoy partisan politics. In a 2005 interview with The Hook, he commented on the partisanship that was overtaking the General Assembly. He said, "It's not a pleasure to be there. It used to be you were able to have friends on both sides of the aisle. There was a political spirit of compromise. Now you have to win battles." In 2005, Mitchell Van Yahres declined to seek a 13th term in the House of Delegates.

Van Yahres died of lung cancer February 8, 2008 in Charlottesville.
