= Joshua G. Cole =

Virginia house of representatives member

Joshua Cole
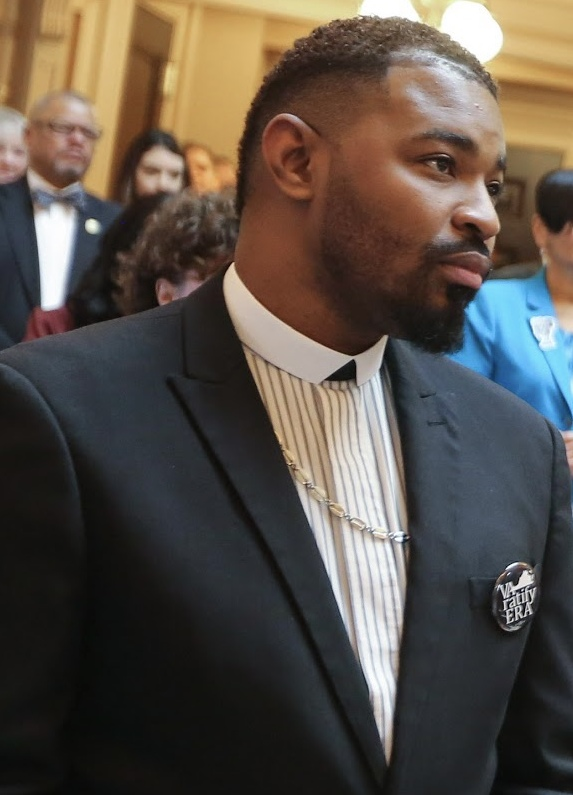
- Cole on the House Floor, 2020

Member of the Virginia House of Delegates
- Incumbent
- Assumed office January 10, 2024
- Preceded by: Lee Ware (redistricting)
- Constituency: 65th district

Member of the Virginia House of Delegates
- In office January 8, 2020 – January 12, 2022
- Preceded by: Robert Thomas
- Succeeded by: Tara Durant
- Constituency: 28th district

Personal details
- Born: July 25, 1990 (age 35) Washington, D.C.
- Party: Democratic
- Spouse: Tiffany Santora

Joshua Gregory Cole (born July 25, 1990) is an American politician. A Democrat, he served one term as member of the Virginia House of Delegates as the representative of Virginia's 28th district. Elected by the Democratic Party of Virginia, Cole served as a member of the Democratic National Committee at the 2020 convention. Cole was elected to represent Virginia's 65th district in the 2023 Virginia House of Delegates election. He was reelected in 2025 defeating Republican Sean Steinway.

== Early life and education ==
Cole was born in Washington, D.C., and grew up in Stafford County, Virginia. He graduated from North Stafford High School and attended Liberty University for three years. He currently attends the University of Mary Washington.

== Career ==
He worked for Liberty University and Richmond City Public Schools. He was also a pastor and is the immediate past president of the Stafford County NAACP. Cole has also had many staff positions in the Virginia Assembly. Between the 2017 and 2019 elections, he was chief of staff to Delegate Kelly Convirs-Fowler.

=== Virginia House of Delegates ===
In 2017, Cole ran for the 28th district in the 2017 Virginia House of Delegates election but lost to Bob Thomas by 73 votes.

In 2019, Cole announced his campaign for the same seat in the 2019 election. He faced then Stafford County Supervisor, Paul V. Milde, who had defeated Thomas in the Republican primary. Cole won with 51.8% of the vote.

His 2021 re-election won the support of the LGBTQ Victory Fund, an organization dedicated to electing LGBTQ candidates. He also received endorsement from The Collective PAC, Joe Biden, Kamala Harris, and Barack Obama. Cole was defeated for re-election in November 2021 by Tara Durant.

In 2023, Cole declared his candidacy for the redrawn 65th district, after incumbent Tara Durant decided to run for the Virginia Senate. He won the seat in the general election.

Cole won re-election comfortably in 2025. He defeated challenger Sean Steinway by approximately 18%
