= Laszlo Berkowits =

Hungarian-born American Reform rabbi (1928–2020)

Rabbi Laszlo Berkowits
- Born: 1928; Derecske, Hungary
- Died: December 20, 2020 (aged 91–92)
- Education: Hebrew Union College – Jewish Institute of Religion
- Employer: Temple Rodef Shalom (Falls Church, Virginia)
- Notable work: "The Boy Who Lost His Birthday"
- Family: perished in the Holocaust, save two sisters

Laszlo Berkowits (February 29, 1928 – December 13, 2020) was a Hungarian-born American Reform rabbi.

From 1944 to 1945, he was imprisoned in Nazi concentration camps at Auschwitz, Neuengamme sub-camp in Braunschweig, Salzgitter-Watenstedt sub-camp and the Ravensbrück concentration camp and finally to the Wöbbelin concentration camp on 26 April 1945. After liberation 2 May 1945, he was among Wöbbelin's Jewish survivors evacuated to Sweden. He briefly studied there before moving to the United States, where he began studying to be a rabbi. He was ordained in 1963.

In 1963, Temple Rodef Shalom hired him as its first senior rabbi. He held this title for 35 years, until his retirement in July, 1998. In 1988, he received his Doctor of Divinity from Hebrew Union College-Jewish Institute of Religion. He served as Rabbi Emeritus at Temple Rodef Shalom until his death on December 13, 2020 at age 92.

== Published work ==
- The Boy Who Lost His Birthday
