= Rick Morris (politician) =

American politician (born 1968)

Member of the Virginia House of Delegates from the 64th district
- In office January 11, 2012 – January 10, 2018
- Preceded by: William K. Barlow
- Succeeded by: Emily Brewer

Personal details
- Born: Richard Lee Morris; November 6, 1968 (age 57) Fort Polk, Louisiana, U.S.
- Party: Republican
- Spouse: Kathryn Herd (divorced)
- Education: Saint Leo University (BA); Regent University (JD)
- Occupation: Lawyer; politician

Military service
- Branch/service: United States Navy
- Years of service: 1988–2010
- Unit: J.A.G. Corps
- Battles/wars: Iraq War

Richard Lee Morris (born November 6, 1968) is an American attorney and Republican politician.

== Early life, education, and military career ==
Morris was born in Fort Polk, Louisiana, during the Vietnam War. He was raised in Kansas.

Morris served in the United States Navy from 1988 through 2010. The first part of his career was spent in submarines. After receiving a B.A. degree in sociology from Saint Leo University in 1998, he transferred to become a Legalman. He was later commissioned as a Limited Duty Officer, after which he received a J.D. from Regent University. He served in Iraq working on reform of the Iraqi judicial system.

In 2022, Morris was disbarred from practicing law after it was discovered that he had defrauded distressed veterans. The District of Columbia Court of Appeals found that Morris exploited vulnerable clients by charging exorbitant fees while providing little to no legal assistance, leading to his removal from the legal profession.

== Political career ==
After retiring from the Navy in 2010, Morris was elected chair of the Isle of Wight County Republican Committee. In November 2011, he defeated 10-term Democratic incumbent William K. Barlow for the 64th House district seat by a vote of 12,960 to 10,467. Morris won re-election to a 2nd term on November 5, 2013, running unopposed.

Morris did not seek re-election in 2017.
