= May Nivar =

Virginian politician

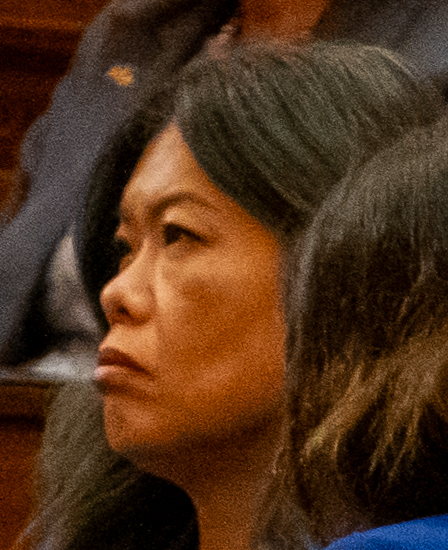

Member of the Virginia House of Delegates from the 57th district
- Incumbent
- Assumed office January 14, 2026
- Preceded by: David Owen

Personal details
- Born: Philadelphia, Pennsylvania
- Party: Democratic
- Education: New York University

May Nivar is an American politician who is the elected member of the Virginia House of Delegates for the 57th District. She took office as a member of the 164th Virginia General Assembly on January 14, 2026. She won election on November 4, 2025, defeating Republican incumbent David Owen.

== Early life and education ==
Nivar was born in Philadelphia, Pennsylvania, to immigrant parents from China. She met her husband, Carlos, while working at a supermarket to help pay for college. She has three children. Nivar graduated from New York University with a degree in journalism. Nivar has lived in Richmond for 20 years, and has worked for corporations, including Altria.

== Earlier political career ==
Nivar was appointed to the Virginia Asian Advisory Board by Governor Terry McAuliffe, where she served as vice chair and as chair.

== Virginia House of Delegates ==
In her 2025 election, her campaign priorities were the economy, public schools, abortion and contraception access, expanding access to healthcare, safe communities, equal protection for minorities, and opposing climate change.

=== 2026 Legislative Session ===
In 2026, Nivar carried HB 1113, which directs the Virginia Department of Education to develop, adopt, and provide local school boards with guidance on the adoption of policies governing the provision of culturally responsive and language-appropriate mental health support and services for students. The bill was signed by Governor Spanberger.

== Electoral History ==
=== 2026 ===
2025 Virginia House of Delegates District 57 Election
Primary election
Party	Candidate	Votes	%
Democratic	May Nivar	4,393	63.03
Democratic	Andrew Schear	2,577	36.97
Total votes		6,970	100.00
General election
Democratic	May Nivar	24,187	55.54
Republican	David Owen	19,296	44.31
Total votes		43,483	99.85
Democratic gain from Republican			
