= Temple Rodef Shalom (McLean, Virginia) =

- רודף שלום
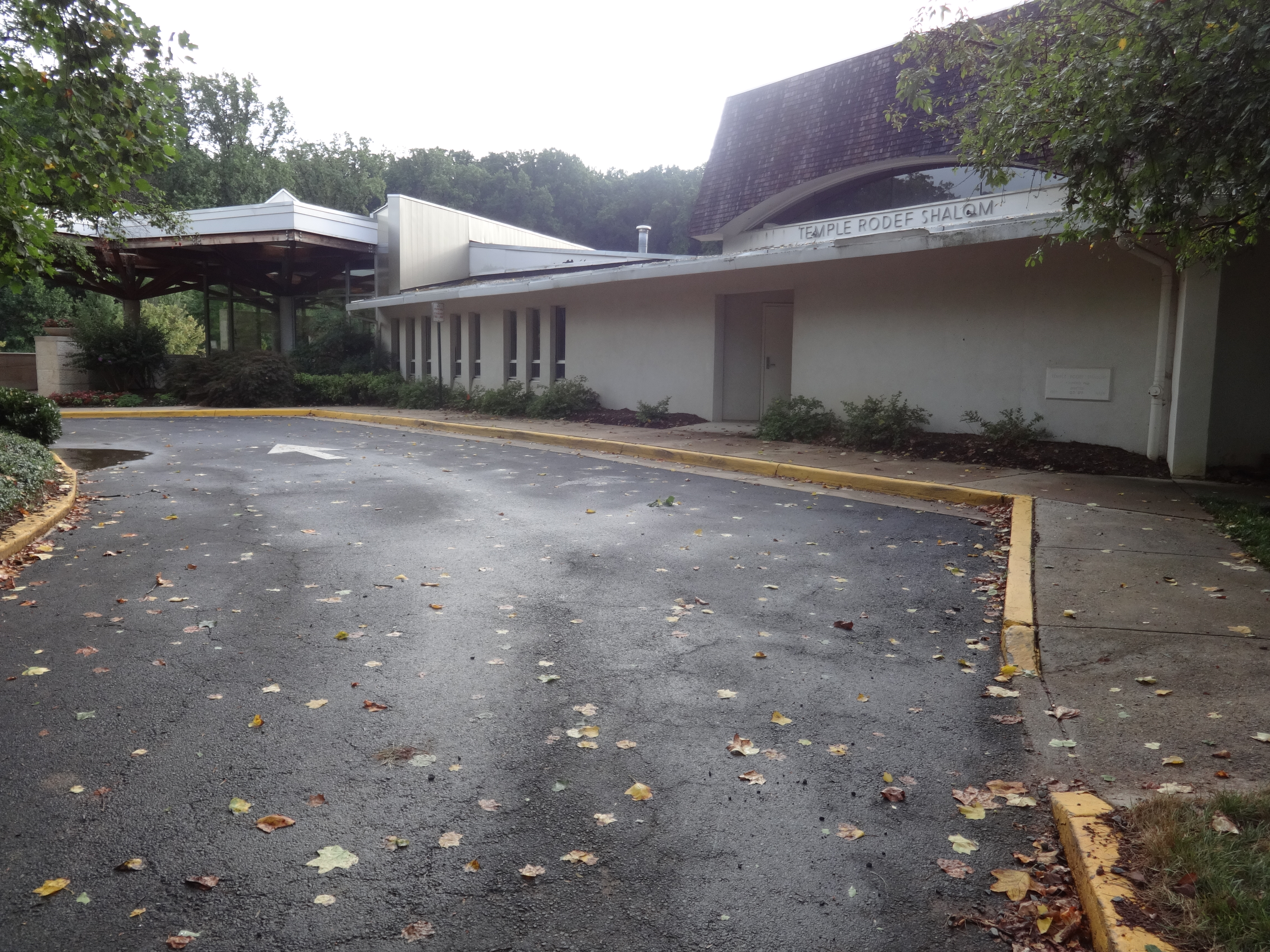

- Location in Virginia

Religion
- Affiliation: Reform Judaism
- Ecclesiastical or organisational status: Synagogue
- Leadership: Rabbi Amy Schwartzman
- Status: Active

Location
- Location: 2100 Westmoreland Street, McLean, Fairfax County, Virginia 22043
- Country: United States
- Coordinates: 38°54′21″N 77°10′21″W

Architecture
- Established: 1962 (as a congregation)
- Completed: 1962

Website
- templerodefshalom.org

Temple Rodef Shalom (Hebrew: רודף שלום) is a Reform Jewish congregation and synagogue located at 2100 Westmoreland Street, McLean, in Fairfax County, Virginia, in the United States. Founded in 1962, it counts a membership of over 1,800 households and is the largest congregation in Virginia.

In 1963, the Temple hired Laszlo Berkowits as its first rabbi. In 1998, it became one of the largest congregations in the United States to have a female rabbi, when it replaced Berkowits, who had decided to retire, with then-Associate Rabbi Amy Schwartzman as the senior rabbi.

The Temple's other rabbis are Jeffrey Saxe and Alexandra Stein. It hired its first cantor, Michael Shochet, in 1998. Sydney Michaeli is the associate cantor and Carly Levin Santalone is the student cantor.

== Notable members ==
- Marcus Simon
- Chuck Todd
