= William J. Howell =

American politician (born 1943)

William Howell
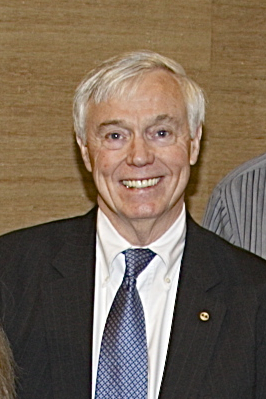

54th Speaker of the Virginia House of Delegates
- In office January 8, 2003 – January 10, 2018
- Preceded by: Lacey Putney (acting)
- Succeeded by: Kirk Cox

Member of the Virginia House of Delegates from the 28th district
- In office January 8, 1992 – January 10, 2018
- Preceded by: Clinton Miller
- Succeeded by: Bob Thomas

Member of the Virginia House of Delegates from the 53rd district
- In office January 13, 1988 – January 8, 1992
- Preceded by: Tom Moncure
- Succeeded by: Jim Scott

Personal details
- Born: William James Howell; May 8, 1943 (age 83) Washington, D.C., U.S.
- Party: Republican
- Spouse: Cecelia Joy Stump
- Education: University of Richmond (BS); University of Virginia (LLB)

William James Howell (born May 8, 1943) is an American attorney and former politician from Virginia. A member of the Republican Party, he represented the 28th district in the House of Delegates from 1992 until 2018, and served as Speaker of the House of Delegates from 2003 to 2018.

Howell presided over the House of Delegates during a period of Republican dominance in the chamber. During his tenure, he acquired a reputation as a political pragmatist, and faced internal criticism from Republican delegates affiliated with the Tea Party movement. He is also noted for heading Virginia's controversial redistricting efforts following the 2010 census and firmly opposing efforts to expand Medicaid under the Patient Protection and Affordable Care Act.

== Early life and education ==
William James Howell was born on May 8, 1943, in Washington, D.C., the second of four children of William Fayette Howell and the former Eileen Hill. His father, an employee of the United Nations Relief and Rehabilitation Administration, joined the World Bank in 1946, where he served in a number of executive positions until his death in 1964.

His mother, a native of England and daughter of trade unionist and academic Levi Hill, accompanied her father on a lecture tour of the United States, where she met her future husband. About a year after Howell's birth, the family moved to Alexandria, Virginia, where he grew up. Howell was raised in a civically active family and described both of his parents as "New Deal Democrats." Citing a need to discover his own political philosophy while at college, he spent a summer reading different authors from across the ideological spectrum and was eventually influenced by the conservative ideas of Barry Goldwater and Ronald Reagan.

After graduating from Fairfax High School in 1960, he studied business administration at the University of Richmond, where his classmates included Robert S. Jepson, Jr. and Leslie M. Baker, Jr. He attended the University of Virginia School of Law and was admitted to the state bar in 1967.

== Career ==
=== House of Delegates service and speakership ===
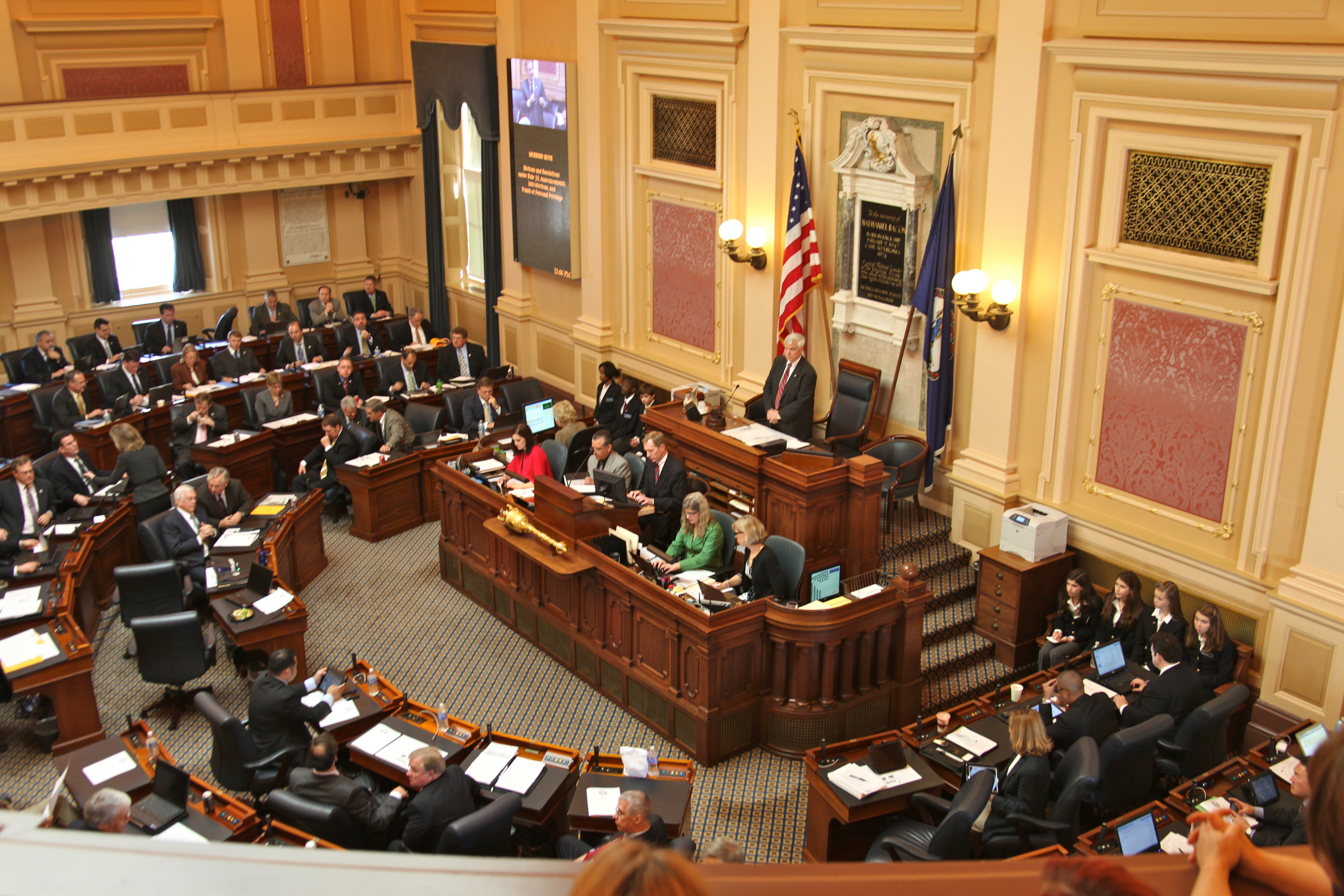
Howell presiding over a session of the House in 2012

In 1987, three-term incumbent Republican delegate Thomas M. Moncure Jr. announced that he would not be seeking reelection. Howell ran for the open seat at the urging of state senator John Chichester and easily won the three-way race against Democrat Thomas Savage and Independent Al Fagan.

In 2017, Howell announced that he would not seek reelection, retiring at the end of his term. Later that week, Kirk Cox, who had served under Howell as the House Majority Leader since 2010, was unanimously elected by the General Assembly House Republican Caucus as their choice for the next speaker.

=== Later career ===
He also serves as chairman of the Virginia Sesquicentennial of the American Civil War Commission. After leaving office, he joined McGuireWoods Consulting in 2018.

== Personal life ==
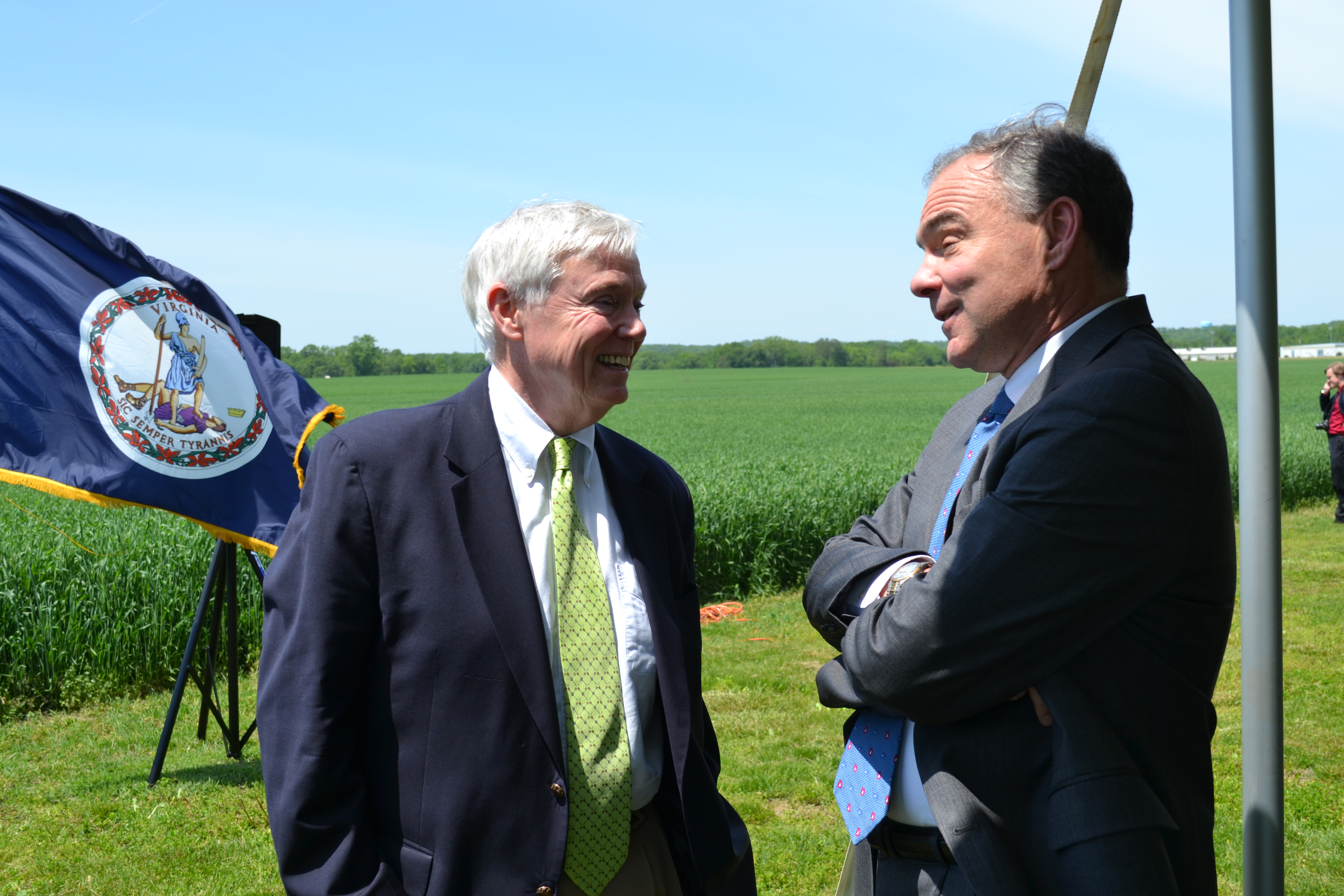
Howell and U.S. Senator Tim Kaine at Fredericksburg's Slaughter Pen Farm Historic Site in 2013

Howell married Cecelia Joy "Cessie" Stump in 1966. They live in Falmouth in Stafford County, Virginia. The couple had two sons, William Fayette Howell, II and Leland Jack Howell. The couple has seven grandchildren. Howell is a deeply religious Baptist, and, in the 1990s, along with Bob McDonnell, Randy Forbes, and one other delegate, he founded a prayer group and Bible study that meets weekly when the Virginia General Assembly is in session.

== Electoral history ==
Date	Election	Candidate	Party	Votes	%
Virginia House of Delegates, 53rd district
Nov 3, 1987	General	William J. Howell	Republican	7,598	48.51
Nov 3, 1987	General	Thomas Y. Savage	Democratic	5,752	36.72
Nov 3, 1987	General	M. Alfred Fagan	Independent	2,313	14.77
Nov 3, 1987	General	Write Ins		0	0.00
Nov 3, 1987	General	Tom Moncure did not seek reelection; seat stayed Republican			
Nov 7, 1989	General	William J. Howell	Republican	12,964	99.86
Nov 7, 1989	General	Write Ins		18	0.14
Virginia House of Delegates, 28th district
Nov 5, 1991	General	William J. Howell	Republican	7,805	75.24
Nov 5, 1991	General	Marcia J. Preston	Democratic	2,568	24.76
Nov 5, 1991	General	Write Ins		0	0.00
Nov 5, 1991	General	Clinton Miller redistricted to 26th district; seat stayed Republican			
Nov 2, 1993	General	William J. Howell	Republican	11,904	73.72
Nov 2, 1993	General	Marcia J. Preston	Democratic	3,240	20.07
Nov 2, 1993	General	David E. O'Keeffe	Independent	1,002	6.21
Nov 2, 1993	General	Write Ins		1	0.01
Nov 7, 1995	General	William J. Howell	Republican	10,518	69.41
Nov 7, 1995	General	M. Alicia Knight	Democratic	4,633	30.57
Nov 7, 1995	General	Write Ins		2	0.01
Nov 4, 1997	General	William J. Howell	Republican	15,930	98.24
Nov 4, 1997	General	Write Ins		286	1.76
Nov 2, 1999	General	William J. Howell	Republican	11,587	80.08
Nov 2, 1999	General	Garrett T. Baker	Independent	2,839	19.62
Nov 2, 1999	General	Write Ins		44	0.30
Nov 6, 2001	General	William J. Howell	Republican	10,964	63.83
Nov 6, 2001	General	Noreen C. Crowley	Democratic	6,196	36.07
Nov 6, 2001	General	Write Ins		17	0.10
Nov 4, 2003	General	William J. Howell	Republican	7,373	96.49
Nov 4, 2003	General	Write Ins		268	3.51
Nov 8, 2005	General	William J. Howell	Republican	14,807	94.64
Nov 8, 2005	General	Write Ins		838	5.36
Nov 6, 2007	General	William J. Howell	Republican	8,726	61.70
Nov 6, 2007	General	Clyde W. Matthews	Democratic	4,926	34.83
Nov 6, 2007	General	Craig E. Ennis	Independent Greens	457	3.23
Nov 6, 2007	General	Write Ins		33	0.23
Nov 3, 2009	General	William J. Howell	Republican	14,909	74.82
Nov 3, 2009	General	Craig E. Ennis	Independent Greens	4,874	24.46
Nov 3, 2009	General	Write Ins		143	0.71
Nov 8, 2011	General	William J. Howell	Republican	9,350	91.77
Nov 8, 2011	General	Write Ins		838	8.22
Nov 5, 2013	General	William J. Howell	Republican	14,998	90.77
Nov 5, 2013	General	Write Ins		1,525	9.23
Nov 3, 2015	General	William J. Howell	Republican	8,060	60.26
Nov 3, 2015	General	Kandy A. Hilliard	Democratic	5,272	39.41
Nov 3, 2015	General	Write Ins		44	0.33
