= Sally L. Hudson =

Former Virginia house of representatives member

Sally Hudson
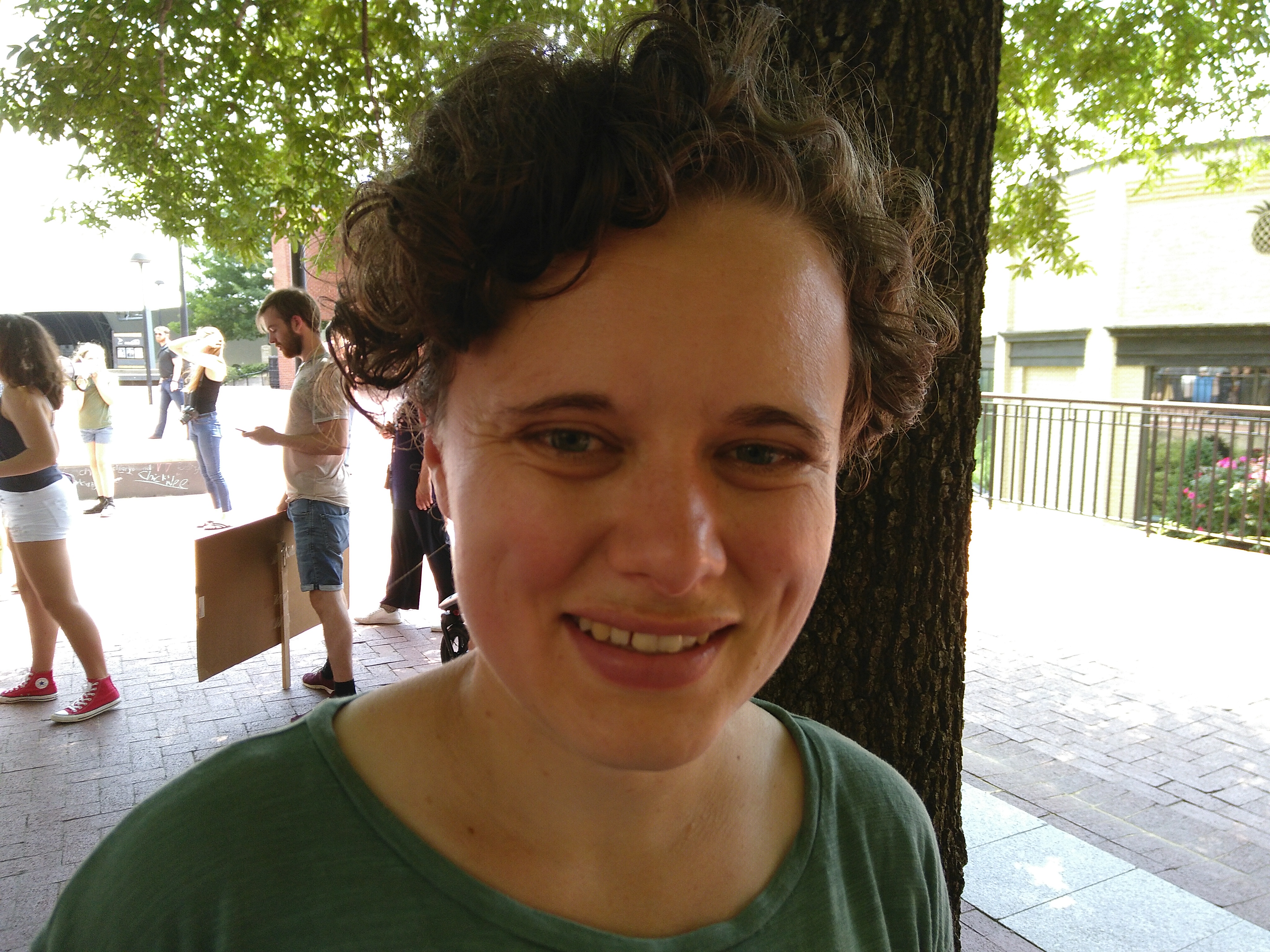

Member of the Virginia House of Delegates from the 57th district
- In office January 8, 2020 – January 10, 2024
- Preceded by: David Toscano
- Succeeded by: David Owen (redistricting)

Personal details
- Born: June 19, 1988 (age 38) Iowa City, Iowa
- Party: Democratic
- Education: Stanford University (BA); Massachusetts Institute of Technology (PhD)
- Committees: Agriculture Chesapeake and Natural Resources; Communications, Technology and Innovation; Finance
- Website: https://www.sallyforvirginia.com/

Sally Lindquist Hudson is an American economist and politician. She was the first woman elected to represent the 57th district in the Virginia House of Delegates, serving from 2020 to 2024 as a member of the Democratic Party. The district included all of the city of Charlottesville and portions of nearby Albemarle County.

== Early life ==
Hudson grew up in Lincoln, Nebraska. She studied economics and math at Stanford University, and received her PhD in economics from MIT.

== Career ==
After earning her Ph.D., Hudson joined the faculty at the Batten School of the University of Virginia as an Assistant Professor of Public Policy, Education, and Economics. Her research focuses on public sector labor economics and higher education finance.

== Political career ==
=== 2019 ===
In the 2019 Virginia House of Delegates election, Hudson challenged incumbent Democrat David Toscano, the former house minority leader. However, Toscano announced his retirement and did not run for reelection. Instead, Hudson faced architect Kathleen Galvin in the primaries. Hudson won with 65.5% of the vote.

Hudson ran unopposed in the general election, and won with 96.1% of the vote.

As a freshman legislator in 2020, Hudson successfully carried legislation to authorize the use of ranked-choice voting in Virginia's local elections.

=== 2021 ===
Hudson was re-elected in the 2021 Virginia House of Delegates elections, defeating her Republican challenger 78.5% to 21.3%.

=== 2023 ===
On November 21, 2022, Hudson announced a run for the 11th district of the Senate of Virginia in the 2023 Virginia Senate election. She lost the Democratic primary election to incumbent Creigh Deeds by a margin of 50.9% to 49.1%.
