= Stacey Carroll =

American politician

Member of the Virginia House of Delegates from the 64th district
- Incumbent
- Assumed office January 14, 2026
- Preceded by: Paul Milde

Personal details
- Party: Democratic
- Website: staceycarrollforva.com

Stacey Carroll is an American politician who was elected as a member of the Virginia House of Delegates in 2025. A member of the Democratic Party, she defeated incumbent Republican Paul Milde. Carroll is a National Guard non-commissioned officer with 19 years of service. She is also a certified public accountant.
