= Jim Scott (Virginia politician) =

American politician (1938–2017)

Member of the Virginia House of Delegates from the 53rd district
- In office January 8, 1992 – January 8, 2014
- Preceded by: Bill Howell
- Succeeded by: Marcus Simon

Member of the Fairfax County Board of Supervisors from the Providence district
- In office January 1972 – July 1986
- Succeeded by: Katherine Hanley

Personal details
- Born: James Martin Scott; June 11, 1938 Galax, Virginia, U.S.
- Died: April 13, 2017 (aged 78) Springfield, Virginia, U.S.
- Party: Democratic
- Spouse: Nancy Virginia Cromwell
- Children: Casey, Mary Alice
- Education: University of North Carolina; George Mason University
- Occupation: Community affairs consultant

James Martin Scott (June 11, 1938 – April 13, 2017), known as "Landslide Jim", was an American politician and community affairs consultant. A member of the Democratic Party, he was elected to the Virginia House of Delegates in November 1991 by a margin of a single vote, and served eleven terms, declining to seek re-election in 2013. He represented the city of Falls Church and part of Fairfax County, including Merrifield; since at least 2002, the district was numbered the 53rd.

== Early and family life ==
Born in Galax, Virginia, in 1938, Scott graduated from the University of North Carolina at Chapel Hill, North Carolina, receiving a B.A. in 1960; and M.A. in 1965. Upon moving to northern Virginia to work for the Inova Health System, Scott attended graduate classes at George Mason University, and received a master's degree in public affairs in 1982. His charitable work included through his United Church of Christ church, the Fairfax Partnership for Youth (board of directors), AHOME (Affordable Housing Opportunities Means Everyone), and the Fairfax Fair.

== Career ==
Scott worked as community affairs consultant for Inova Fairfax Hospital. He served, part-time, on the Fairfax County Board of Supervisors from 1972 to 1986. Other public service positions he held were on the Metropolitan Washington Council of Governments, Northern Virginia Planning District Commission, Northern Virginia Transportation Commission (former chairman), Virginia Association of Counties (former President), and the Washington Metropolitan Area Transit Authority.

Scott was elected to the Virginia House of Delegates in the 1991 House of Delegates election to represent the 53rd district (covering the city of Falls Church), defeating Republican opponent David G. Sanders. Following a recount, Scott's margin of victory was determined to be a single vote (6,493 to 6,492), resulting in him earning the nickname "Landslide Jim". During his tenure in the House of Delegates, he was considered to be a political liberal. Scott was re-elected 10 times. from 1991 to 2011.

In 2013 Scott announced that he would not run for reelection to the House of Delegates. He endorsed Marcus Simon, his former aide turned real estate lawyer, who was elected his successor.

== Death ==
Jim Scott died on April 13, 2017, from complications of Alzheimer's disease. He was 78 years old.

== See also ==
- List of close election results
