= David Toscano =

American politician

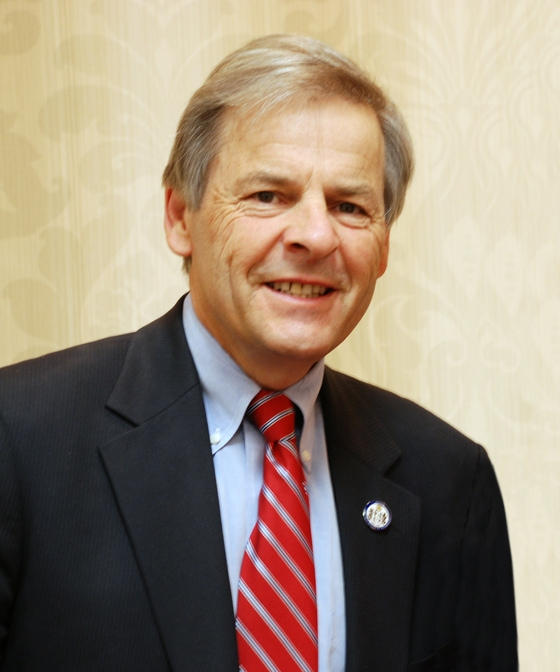

Minority Leader of the Virginia House of Delegates
- In office November 19, 2011 – December 31, 2018
- Preceded by: Ward Armstrong
- Succeeded by: Eileen Filler-Corn

Member of the Virginia House of Delegates from the 57th district
- In office January 11, 2006 – January 8, 2020
- Preceded by: Mitchell Van Yahres
- Succeeded by: Sally L. Hudson

Mayor of Charlottesville
- In office 1994–1996
- Preceded by: Tom Vandever
- Succeeded by: Kay Slaughter

Personal details
- Born: David Joseph Toscano; June 28, 1950 (age 76) Syracuse, New York, U.S.
- Party: Democratic
- Spouse: Nancy Tramontin
- Children: 1
- Education: Colgate University (BA); Boston College (MA, PhD); University of Virginia (JD)
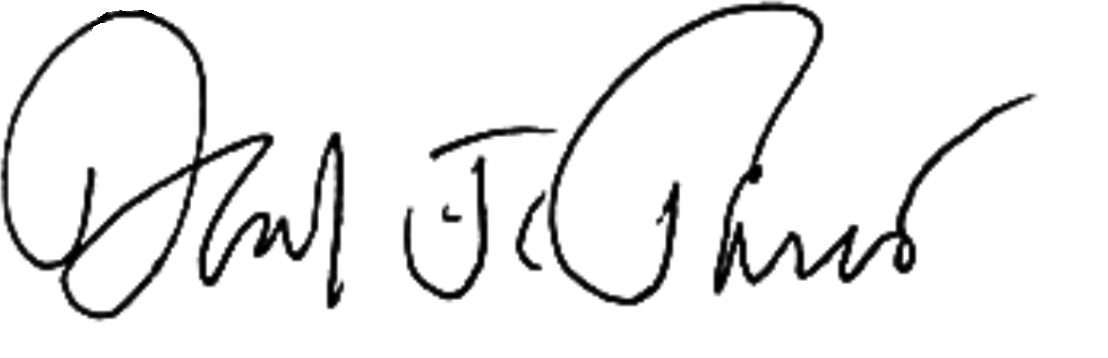
- Signature
- Website: Official website

David Joseph Toscano (born June 28, 1950) is an American politician and lawyer.

== Career ==
A Democrat, he served on the Charlottesville, Virginia city council from 1990 to 2002 and was mayor from 1994 to 1996. In November 2005 he was elected to the Virginia House of Delegates, succeeding Mitchell Van Yahres. He represented the 57th district, made up of the city of Charlottesville and part of Albemarle County. Toscano served as House Minority Leader from 2011-2018.

== Electoral history ==
Toscano first won the Democratic nomination for the District 57 House of Delegates seat in 2005.

Toscano only faced a general election opponent three times: in 2005, against Republican, T. W. McCrystal; and in 2009 and 2011 against Independent candidate, Robert Brandon Smith III.

In 2011, Toscano was elected Minority leader in the House of Delegates.

Toscano did not seek reelection in the 2019 election, while facing an already declared challenge in the Democratic Party primary from Sally L. Hudson, who ultimately won the primary and the general election to succeed him in that seat.

Date	Election	Candidate	Party	Votes	%
United States House of Representatives, 7th district
November 2, 1982	General	J. Kenneth Robinson	Republican	76,752	59.86
November 2, 1982	General	Lindsay G. Dorrier Jr.	Democratic	46,514	36.28
November 2, 1982	General	David J. Toscano	Independent	4,950	3.86
November 2, 1982	General	Write Ins		8	0.00
Virginia House of Delegates, 57th district
November 8, 2005	General	David J. Toscano	Democratic	14,121	75.27
November 8, 2005	General	Thomas W. McCrystal	Republican	4,613	24.59
November 8, 2005	General	Write Ins		27	0.14
November 8, 2005	General	Mitchell Van Yahres did not seek reelection; seat stayed Democratic			
November 6, 2007	General	David J. Toscano	Democratic	10,164	98.35
November 6, 2007	General	Write Ins		171	1.65
November 3, 2009	General	David J. Toscano	Democratic	14,071	78.18
November 3, 2009	General	Robert Brandon Smith III	Independent	3,848	21.38
November 3, 2009	General	Write Ins		79	0.44
November 8, 2011	General	David J. Toscano	Democratic	10,949	80.42
November 8, 2011	General	Robert Brandon Smith III	Independent	2,600	19.10
November 8, 2011	General	Write Ins		65	0.48
November 5, 2013	General	David J. Toscano	Democratic	19,168	97.91
November 5, 2013	General	Write Ins		409	2.09
November 3, 2015	General	David J. Toscano	Democratic	10,459	96.75
November 3, 2015	General	Write Ins		351	3.25
November 8, 2017	General	David J. Toscano	Democratic	25,419	96.89%
November 8, 2017	General	Write Ins		816	3.11%

Virginia House of Delegates
Preceded by Ward Armstrong	Minority Leader of the Virginia House of Delegates; 2011–2018	Succeeded by Eileen Filler-Corn
