= David Owen (Virginia politician) =

American politician from Virginia

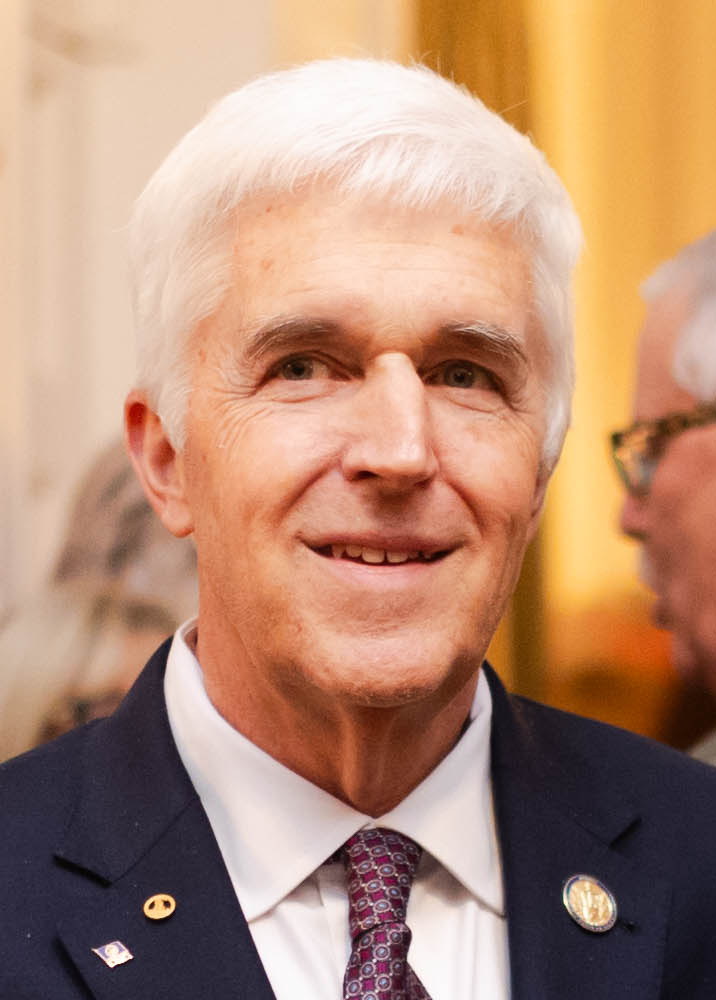

Member of the Virginia House of Delegates from the 57th district
- In office January 10, 2024 – January 14, 2026
- Preceded by: Sally Hudson
- Succeeded by: May Nivar

Personal details
- Born: 1956 (age 69–70) Henrico County, Virginia
- Party: Republican
- Spouse: Ellen G. Owen
- Children: 1
- Education: University of Virginia (BS)

David L. Owen (born 1956) is an American Republican politician from Virginia. He was elected to the Virginia House of Delegates in the 2023 Virginia House of Delegates election from the 57th district. He represented portions of western Henrico County and eastern Goochland in the House of Delegates from 2024 to 2026. He was first elected in 2023 with 51% of the vote, defeating Democratic candidate Susanna Gibson.

== Early life ==
Owen was born in Henrico County, Virginia to William Lee Owen Jr. and Christine McDowell. His father worked with the Highway Department (VDOT) for 40 years, and after that he clerked for the General Assembly for another 25 years. David would attend Tucker High School, before graduating from the University of Virginia in 1981 with a BS in Civil Engineering.

After college, he would get a job as a construction engineer with Texaco USA. This job would briefly bring him to Virginia Beach, where he would meet his future wife, Ellen.

== Political career ==
In 2023, David Owen ran for the 57th District of the Virginia House of Delegates. He was unopposed in the Republican primary. Owen narrowly won the general election on November 7 with 51% of the vote. Owen supports unfettered abortion access through 15 weeks, with exceptions for rape, incest, and the life of the mother in later weeks. In an interview with the Richmond Times-Dispatch, Owen said, "I will always defend a woman’s choice throughout the first 15 weeks and will always protect exceptions for rape, incest, and life of the mother... I will vote against any bills that do not maintain these thresholds." In 2024, Owen was one of five Republican delegates who voted with their Democratic colleagues in support of safeguarding same-sex marriage in Virginia.

In the 2025 Virginia House of Delegates election, he was unseated by May Nivar.
