= Samuel A. Simon =

American playwright and consumer advocate

Samuel A. Simon is an American playwright and performer and author, and leading national advocate for consumer protection and social justice movements.

== Career ==
=== Early years ===
Simon grew up in El Paso, Texas; he attended Mesita Elementary School and in 1963 graduated from El Paso High School. He went on to graduate from the University of Texas at El Paso and received a J.D. degree from the University of Texas Law School in Austin.

=== Consumer advocacy ===
At age 25, he became a founding member of Nader's Raiders, a high-profile public interest and advocacy group spearheaded by Ralph Nader which critically examined the Federal Trade Commission. As a result of the group's work, the FTC reformed and toughened its consumer protection and antitrust enforcement.

He has testified before Congress and published numerous articles and books on consumer advocacy issues. In the 1980s, he served as executive director of the National Citizens Committee for Broadcasting, a national advocacy group backed by Nader which drew attention to excessive violence on children's TV programming. The group, which often struggled with funding issues, was frequently in the news, and—following the breakup of the AT&T monopoly—worked to provide consumers with information to compare long-distance services provided by various carriers.

=== Theater ===
Simon wrote an intensely personal play in 2012 titled The Actual Dance, which chronicles an emotional family roller coaster that began when his wife was diagnosed with breast cancer. "It's sad when two loving souls face leaving each other because of a life-threatening illness," he told a Houston reporter in 2018. The play has been performed hundreds of times since 2013.

=== Writing ===
In October 2021, Simon published The Actual Dance, a memoir based on the play of the same name, "told through the eyes and heart of a husband as he struggles with his worst fears during what everyone expects to be his wife's losing battle with breast cancer." The book won the 2022 IPPY Bronze Medal for memoirs on aging/death and dying.

== Personal ==
Simon's father was a traveling salesman, and his mother worked as a bookkeeper. In 1966, he married his wife, Susan (née Kalmans), a former teacher and psychiatric social worker. They currently live in McLean, Virginia, and have two grown children and four grandchildren. Their son, Marcus Simon, is a state delegate serving in Virginia; their daughter, Dr. Rachael Simon Proper, is a pediatric dentist in Catonsville, Maryland.

He is active in his local community. In 2016, Governor Terry McAuliffe appointed him to the board of directors of the Virginia Recreational Facilities Authority.
