= Electoral reform in Virginia =

Electoral reform in Virginia refers to efforts to change the electoral system in the Commonwealth of Virginia. Virginia has undergone much electoral change since its settling in 1607, many of which were required by federal legislation. However, it remains a relatively conservative state in this respect compared to California and others which have experimented with various alternative systems.

== Direct election of U.S. Senators ==
Originally, U.S. Senators were chosen by the Virginia General Assembly. On February 19, 1914, legislation was introduced in the Virginia House of Delegates calling for the direct election of United States senators by the voters of Virginia. This followed enactment of the Seventeenth Amendment to the United States Constitution on April 8, 1913. Virginia had not voted to ratify the amendment.

== Ballot access ==
There have been many changes designed to make the electoral system more favorable to third parties. These included allowing write-in ballots in U.S. presidential elections. In 1998, SB 316 was passed, changing the number of signatures required for ballot access as follows:

- In statewide races, reducing the number of signatures required from 0.5% of the number of registered voters (approximately 17,000 in 1998) to a flat 10,000;
- In congressional district races, reducing the number of signatures required from 0.5% of the number of voters registered in the district (approximately 1,550 signatures based on the January 1, 1998, registered voter total) to 1,000; and
- Increasing the number of signatures required from each congressional district from 200 to 400.

Currently, the ballot access requirements are as follows:

- For a candidate for the United States Senate, Governor, Lieutenant Governor, or Attorney General, 10,000 signatures, including the signatures of at least 400 qualified voters from each congressional district in the Commonwealth;
- For a candidate for the United States House of Representatives, 1,000 signatures;
- For a candidate for the Senate of Virginia, 250 signatures;
- For a candidate for the House of Delegates or for a constitutional office, 125 signatures;
- For a candidate for membership on the governing body or elected school board of any county or city, 125 signatures; or if from an election district not at large containing 1,000 or fewer registered voters, 50 signatures;
- For a candidate for membership on the governing body or elected school board of any town which has more than 1,500 registered voters, 125 signatures; or if from a ward or other district not at large, 25 signatures;
- For membership on the governing body or elected school board of any town which has 1,500 or fewer registered voters, no petition shall be required;
- For a candidate for director of a soil and water conservation district created pursuant to Article 3 (§ 10.1-506 et seq.) of Chapter 5 of Title 10.1, 25 signatures; and
- For any other candidate, 50 signatures.

== Voting system changes ==
In 2003, FairVote's analysis of Virginia's voting systems determined that amendments to the Constitution of Virginia might be required to implement instant runoff voting in statewide executive elections. § 24.2-673 of the Code of Virginia appears to require use of the plurality system in local executive office elections

HB 2739, a bill to implement instant runoff voting statewide, was introduced by Del. William K. Barlow in 2003 but stricken at his request. In 2004, Barlow introduced HB 956, a bill to allow IRV on a test basis in localities; it died in committee. However, Barlow remained confident that "instant runoff is going to happen soon". Virginians for Instant Runoff Voting organized in 2006 and launched plans to implement the system in more student government elections. IRV is used in single-winner student government elections at the University of Virginia, as promulgated in III(G)(3) of the Spring 2007 University Board of Elections Rules and Regulations. UVA's use of the system predates VIRV's formation.

Bills to join the National Popular Vote Interstate Compact were introduced in 2007, but they died in committee. A bill to study Virginia's methods of allocating electoral votes also died in committee. Virginia was considered a swing state in the 2012 U.S. Presidential election.

Approval voting appears to be prohibited by laws defining an "overvote" as follows: "'Overvote' means a ballot on which a voter casts a vote for a greater number of candidates or positions than the number for which he was lawfully entitled to vote and no vote shall be counted with respect to that office or issue".

Presently, constitutional plurality is required for statewide executive offices, single transferable vote (STV) can be implemented for state House and Senate elections by appropriate legislation, and local governments can implement single transferable vote for their local legislatures and for school board elections.

== Balloting methods ==
2007 also saw increased interest in voter verified paper ballots and other measures to regulate electronic voting machines. A bill to establish a pilot project to audit electronic equipment died in committee. HB 2707 was passed, requiring the phaseout of direct recording electronic devices and prohibiting wireless communication with voting machines. Voting equipment that has been used in Virginia includes Marksense tabulators and DRE.

Absentee ballot rights have been expanded in recent years as well. However, a bill to grant absentee ballots without requiring an excuse (e.g. having to work/commute at least 11 hours between 6 a.m. and 7 p.m.) was defeated in 2006 and again in 2007, as was a bill to allow pregnant women to vote absentee. One of the following excuses is required:

- Student;
- Business;
- Personal business or vacation;
- Working and commuting to and from home for 11 or more hours between 6:00 a.m. and 7:00 p.m.;
- Disability or illness; caregiver; confinement;
- Election official;
- Religious obligation;
- U.S. uniformed services;
- Temporarily residing outside U.S.

The voting age of 18 set by Article II, Section 1 of Constitution of Virginia.

== Initiative and referendum ==
Referendums can be submitted to the people only when authorized by statute or charter. The code specifies numerous types of referendums that voters may petition for, such as a referendum to abolish a county police force. With those exceptions, however, voters cannot propose their own referendums. In 1914, an I&R bill was passed by the House of Delegates but failed in the Senate. The Hampton, Virginia city charter has an I&R provision, however.

== Redistricting ==
Redistricting is overseen by the Joint Reapportionment Committee consisting of House and Senate Privileges and Elections Committee members appointed by those committees' chairs. Democrats controlled the Virginia General Assembly for decades, but Republicans gained control at the close of the 20th century and have used their power to gerrymander districts in their favor, just as the Democrats did. Proposals to establish a redistricting commission or put redistricting in the hands of retired judges have failed. In 2007, a bill was introduced to draw district lines on the basis of political subdivisions and to ban the consideration of incumbency; this bill died in committee. On November 3, 2020, Virginians overwhelmingly approved a ballot referendum, 2020 Virginia Question 1, establishing a bipartisan redistricting commission.

== Prospects for future reform ==
Any statewide electoral reform bill must be approved by Privileges and Elections committees in the Virginia House of Delegates and Virginia Senate. Lacey Putney, chair of the House committee, has been reluctant to embrace major changes to the system. Important players in the electoral reform movement include Virginia resident and former Libertarian Party national chair Bill Redpath and others associated with FairVote.

== See also ==
- Electoral reform in the United States
