= Tara Durant =

American politician from Virginia

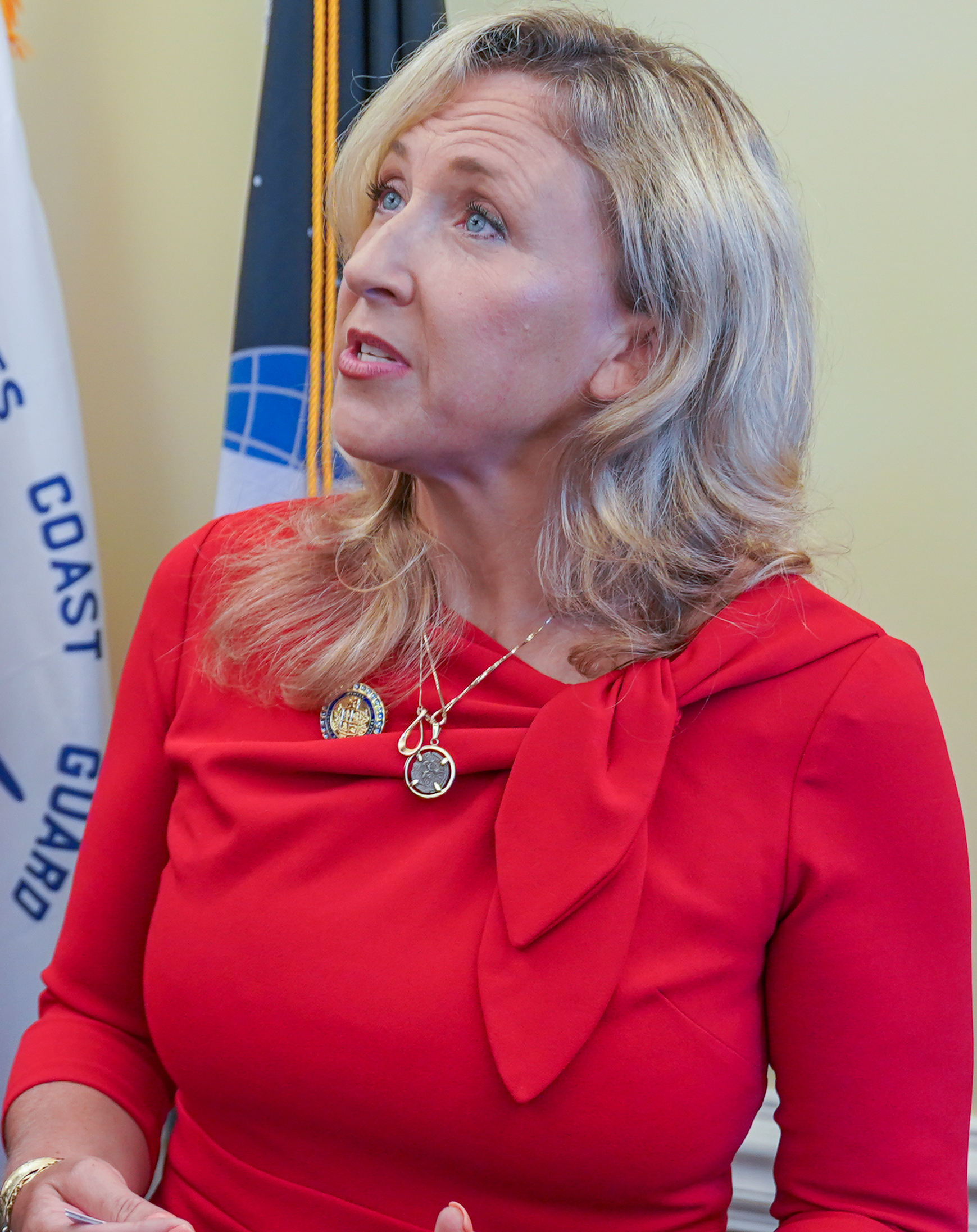

Member of the Virginia Senate from the 27th district
- Incumbent
- Assumed office January 10, 2024
- Preceded by: Jill Vogel (redistricting)

Member of the Virginia House of Delegates from the 28th district
- In office January 12, 2022 – January 10, 2024
- Preceded by: Joshua Cole
- Succeeded by: David A. Reid (redistricted)

Personal details
- Born: October 26, 1972 (age 53) Des Moines, Iowa, U.S.
- Party: Republican
- Children: 3
- Education: Coe College (BA); University of Baltimore (attended)

Tara Anne Durant (born October 26, 1972) is an American politician and former educator serving as a member of the Virginia Senate for the 27th district since 2024. The district includes the entirety of Fredericksburg, along with portions of Spotsylvania and Stafford counties. A member of the Republican Party, she served as a member of the Virginia House of Delegates from 2022 to 2024. She was a candidate in the 2026 election to represent Virginia's 7th congressional district before suspending her campaign prior to the primary.

== Early life and education ==
Durant was born in Des Moines, Iowa, in 1972. She earned a Bachelor of Arts degree in communications and political science from Coe College and attended the University of Baltimore School of Law.

== Career ==
=== Virginia General Assembly ===
Durant was elected to the Virginia House of Delegates in November 2021, defeating incumbent Democrat Joshua G. Cole. She assumed office on January 12, 2022.

In 2024, Durant was elected to the Virginia Senate, representing Virginia's 27th Senate district. She currently serves on the Senate Committees on Education & Health, Local Government, and Privileges & Elections; as well as the Behavioral Health Commission, Rappahannock River Basin Commission, Autism Advisory Council, Veterans Services Board, and the Southern Regional Education Board's Legislative Advisory Council.

=== Professional life ===
Outside of politics, Durant has worked as an educator in Iowa and Virginia. She was a teacher at the Holy Cross Academy in Stafford County from 2017 to 2021 and works as a librarian at the school.
