= Virginia's 57th House of Delegates district =

Virginia legislative district

District map from the 2023 election

Virginia's 57th House of Delegates district elects one of 100 seats in the Virginia House of Delegates, the lower house of the state's bicameral legislature. District 57 consists of parts of Charlottesville and Albemarle County. Following the redistricting after the 2020 Census, the district was moved to include areas of Goochland County and Henrico County. It has been represented Democrat May Nivar since 2026.

== District officeholders ==
Years	Delegate	Party	Electoral history
January 12, 1983 – January 11, 2006	Mitchell Van Yahres	Democratic	First ever delegate in district
January 11, 2006 – January 8, 2020	David Toscano	Democratic	Minority Leader of the Virginia House of Delegates (2011-2018)
January 8, 2020 – January 10, 2024	Sally Hudson	Democratic	Virginia House of Delegates (2020–2024)
January 10, 2024 – January 14, 2026	David Owen	Republican	Virginia House of Delegates (2024–2026)
January 14, 2026 – present	May Nivar	Democratic	Virginia House of Delegates (2026–present)

== Electoral history ==
Date	Election	Candidate	Party	Votes	%
Virginia House of Delegates, 57th district
Nov 8, 2005	General	David J. Toscano	Democratic	14,121	75.27
Nov 8, 2005	General	Thomas W. McCrystal	Republican	4,613	24.59
Nov 8, 2005	General	Write Ins		27	0.14
Nov 8, 2005	General	Mitchell Van Yahres did not seek reelection; seat stayed Democratic			
Nov 6, 2007	General	David J. Toscano	Democratic	10,164	98.35
Nov 6, 2007	General	Write Ins		171	1.65
Nov 3, 2009	General	David J. Toscano	Democratic	14,071	78.18
Nov 3, 2009	General	Robert Brandon Smith, III	Independent	3,848	21.38
Nov 3, 2009	General	Write Ins		79	0.44
Nov 8, 2011	General	David J. Toscano	Democratic	10,949	80.42
Nov 8, 2011	General	Robert Brandon Smith, III	Independent	2,600	19.10
Nov 8, 2011	General	Write Ins		65	0.48
Nov 5, 2013	General	David J. Toscano	Democratic	19,168	97.91
Nov 5, 2013	General	Write Ins		409	2.09
Nov 3, 2015	General	David J. Toscano	Democratic	10,459	96.75
Nov 3, 2015	General	Write Ins		351	3.25
Nov 8, 2017	General	David J. Toscano	Democratic	25,419	96.89%
Nov 8, 2017	General	Write Ins		816	3.11%
