= Virginia's 28th House of Delegates district =

Virginia legislative district

Virginia's 28th State House of Delegates district
- District map from the 2023 election
Delegate
David Reid; D–Ashburn
since January 10, 2024
- Demographics: 55% White; 7% Black; 10% Hispanic; 22% Asian; 5% Multiracial
- Population (2023) • Voting age: 87,715; 18
- Registered voters (2024): 63,467

Virginia's 28th House of Delegates district elects one of 100 seats in the Virginia House of Delegates, the lower house of the state's bicameral legislature. District 28 contains parts of Loudoun County. The seat is currently held by David A. Reid.

== District officeholders ==
Years	Delegate	Party	Electoral history
January 12, 1983 – January 8, 1992	Clinton Miller	Republican	First ever delegate in district
January 8, 1992 – January 10, 2018	Bill Howell	Republican	Elected Speaker of the House (2003–18)
January 10, 2018 – January 8, 2020	Robert Thomas	Republican	First elected in 2017
January 8, 2020 – January 12, 2022	Joshua G. Cole	Democratic	Lost re-election bid
January 12, 2022 – January 10, 2024	Tara Durant	Republican	First elected in 2021. Elected to the Virginia Senate.
January 10, 2024 – Present	David A. Reid	Democratic	Redistricted

== Electoral history ==
=== 2021 ===
Virginia's 28th House of Delegates district, 2021
Party	Candidate	Votes	%
Republican	Tara Durant	16,378	51.0
Democratic	Joshua G. Cole (incumbent)	15,731	48.9
Write-in		39	0.1
Total votes		32,148	100.0
Republican gain from Democratic			
