= Virginia's 64th House of Delegates district =

Virginia legislative district

District map from the 2023 election

Virginia's 64th House of Delegates district elects one of 100 seats in the Virginia House of Delegates, the lower house of the state's bicameral legislature. District 64, located in Isle of Wight County, Prince George County, Suffolk, Surry County, was represented by Republican Rick Morris from 2012 to 2018. Due to scandal, Morris did not seek re-election in Virginia's November 2017 elections. Based on the results of the election, the seat has been held by Republican Emily Brewer since January 2018. Emily Brewer defeated Democrat Michele Joyce in district 64 on November 5, 2019 and won reelection on November 2, 2021.

In the 2023 Virginia House of Delegates election, Republican Paul Milde was elected. In 2025, he was unseated by Democrat Stacey Carroll.
