= Emily Jordan =

American politician from Virginia (born 1984)

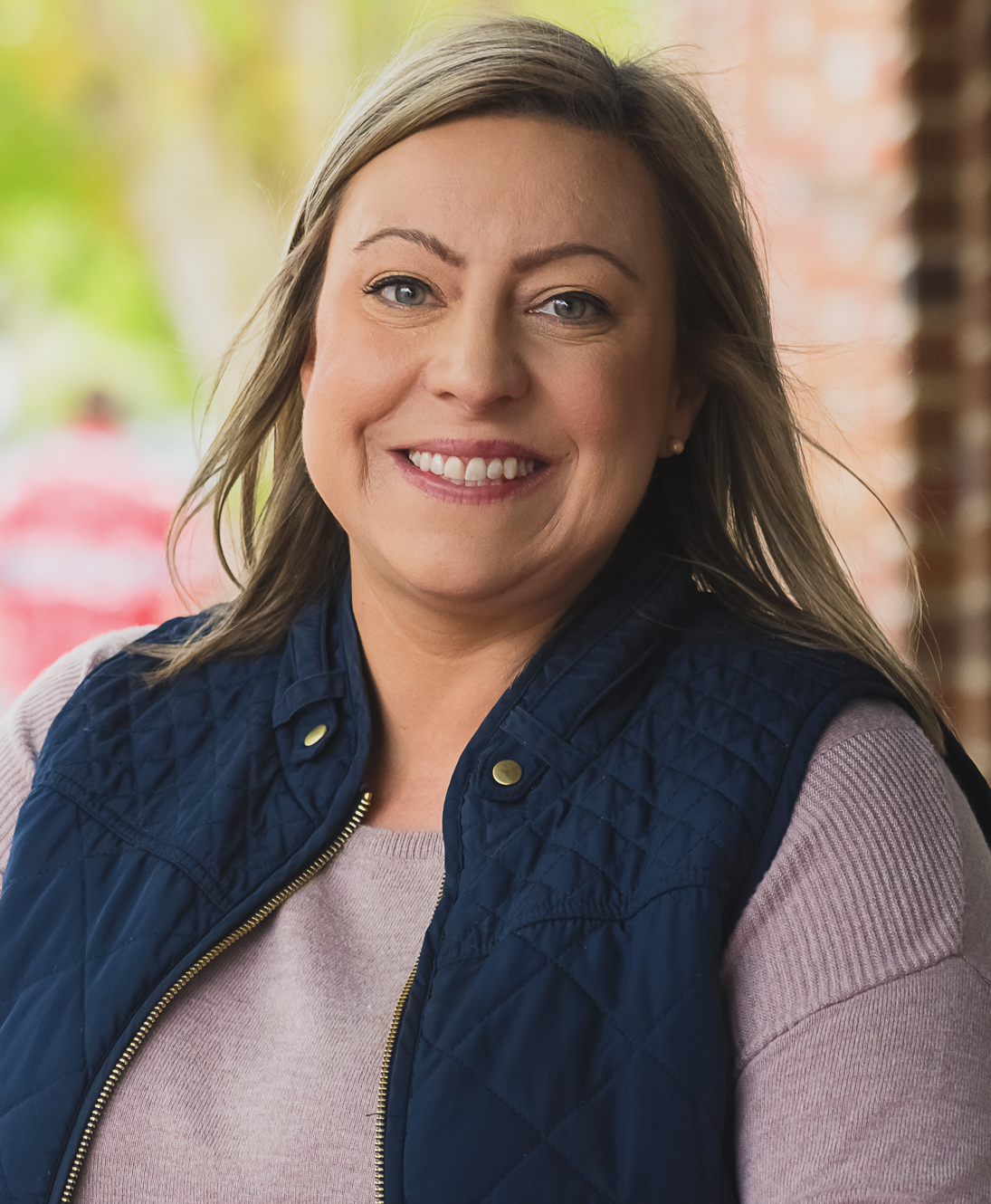

Member of the Virginia Senate from the 17th district
- Incumbent
- Assumed office January 10, 2024
- Preceded by: Constituency established

Member of the Virginia House of Delegates from the 64th district
- In office January 10, 2018 – January 10, 2024
- Preceded by: Rick Morris
- Succeeded by: Nadarius Clark (Redistricting)

Personal details
- Born: Emily Marie Klohn; May 27, 1984 (age 42) Wyandot County, Ohio, U.S.
- Party: Republican
- Spouse(s): Joey (divorced); Andrew
- Children: Presley
- Occupation: Business Owner
- Committees: Courts of Justice, General Laws and Technology, Rehabilitation and Social Services
- Website: www.brewerforva.com

Emily Marie Jordan (née Klohn; formerly Brewer) (born May 27, 1984) is an American politician serving as a member of the Virginia Senate representing the 17th District since 2024. She previously served as a member of the Virginia House of Delegates representing the 64th District from 2018 to 2024.

== Early life and career ==
Jordan was born on May 27, 1984, in Wyandot County, Ohio, and raised in Suffolk, Virginia. Jordan attended Nansemond River High School, where she was a member of the DECA Club, and Tidewater Community College.

In 2003, Jordan served as treasurer of the Bennett’s Creek Volunteer Rescue Squad. She reported the organization to the Suffolk police for financial improprieties and ignoring evidence of fraud and embezzlement with its charitable gambling earnings. The Virginia Department of Charitable Gaming audited the organization in August 2003 and found four deficiencies but no criminal activity.

She worked at Reaction Point Marketing as of 2014. As of 2017, she owned beer and wine shop Uncork'd in Suffolk.

== Political career ==
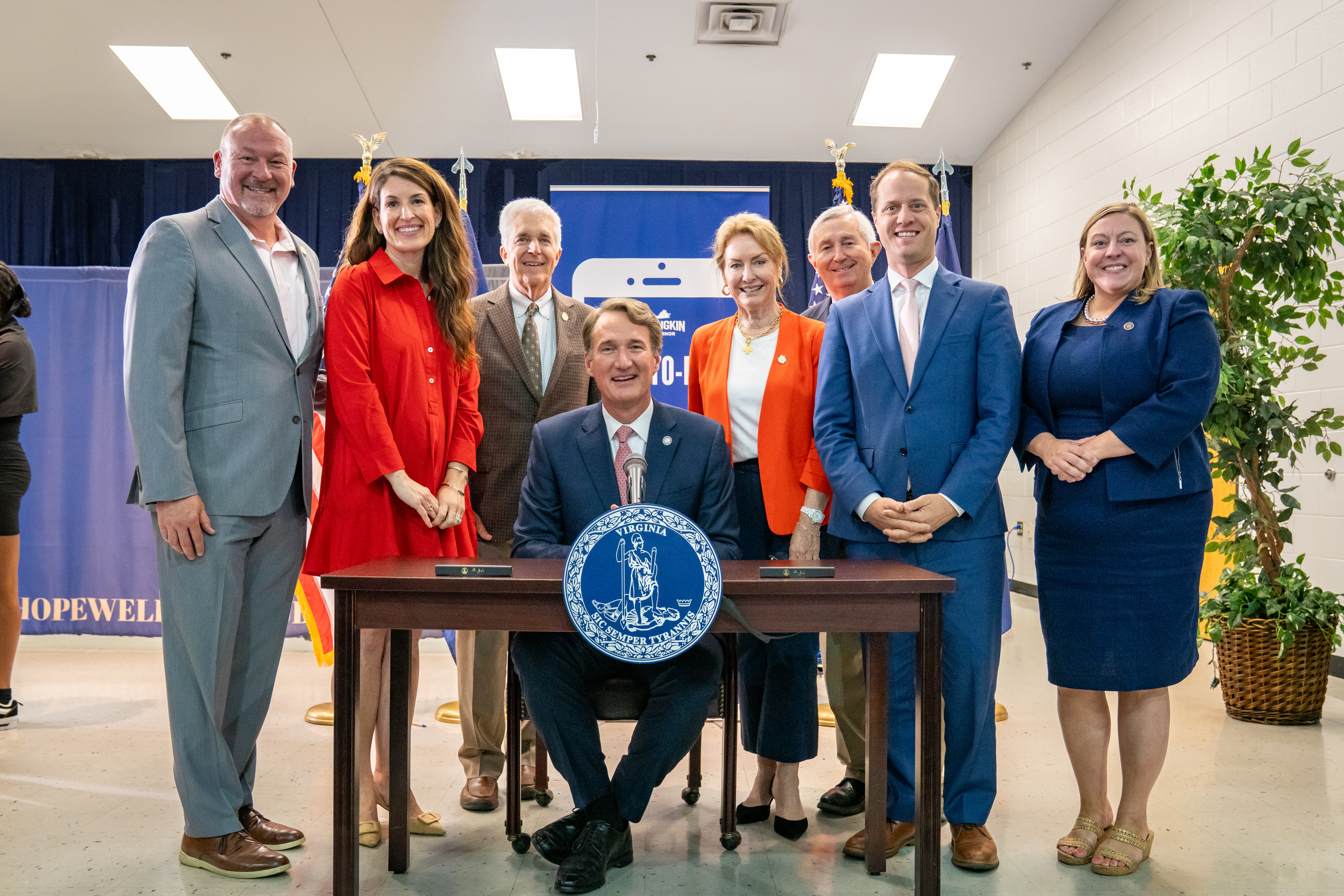
Jordan (furthest right) attends an event with governor Glenn Youngkin and other Virginia legislators in May 2025.

=== Virginia House of Representatives ===
Jordan announced her campaign for the 64th district of the Virginia House of Delegates in the 2017 election after incumbent Republican delegate Rick Morris was charged with domestic violence. Morris ultimately opted to retire instead of seeking re-election. In the June 2017 Republican primary, Jordan defeated her primary opponent, Rex W. Alphin, by a margin of 61% to 39%.

In the November general election, Jordan defeated the Democratic candidate, Rebecca S. Colaw, garnering over 62% of the vote. Jordan was sworn in on January 10, 2018. At the age of 33, she became the youngest female member ever of the Republican caucus in the House of Delegates.

In 2022, Jordan was promoted to chair of the Communications, Technology and Innovation Committee.

=== Virginia Senate ===
Jordan announced her campaign for the 17th district of the Virginia Senate, which was open following redistricting, in the 2023 Virginia Senate election. She defeated former professional NASCAR driver Hermie Sadler in the Republican primary election, who outraised her by about $200,000 as of June 8, 2023. Jordan was also endorsed by Virginia Governor Glenn Youngkin, Lieutenant Governor Winsome Sears and Attorney General Jason Miyares.

Jordan then defeated Democratic delegate Clint Jenkins in the general election, whom she had outraised with $2,265,416 compared to his $1,724,820 as of October 26, 2023. During the campaign, Jordan aired ads calling Jenkins a "domestic abuser" accused of choking his daughter based on a misdemeanor assault and battery of a family or household member charge dismissed in 2004.

== Electoral history ==
Jordan's Election History
Date	Election	Candidate	Party	Votes	%
June 13, 2017	Republican Primary	Emily M. Brewer	Republican	4,418	60.86%
June 13, 2017	Republican Primary	Rex W. Alphin	Republican	2,841	39.14%
Incumbent Rick Morris (R) did not seek reelection.
Nov 7, 2017	General Election	Emily M. Brewer	Republican	19,223	62.41%
Nov 7, 2017	General Election	Rebecca S. Colaw	Democratic	11,551	37.50%
Nov 7, 2017	General Election	Write-Ins		25	0.08%
June 20, 2023	Republican Primary	Emily M. Brewer	Republican	9,552	58.77%
June 20, 2023	Republican Primary	Herman M. "Hermie" Sadler III	Republican	6,700	41.23%

Virginia House of Delegates
Preceded by Rick Morris	Member of the Virginia House of Delegates from the 64th district 2012–2024	Succeeded by Paul Milde
Senate of Virginia
Preceded by Bryce Reeves	Member of the Virginia Senate from the 17th district 2024–Present	Incumbent
