= Marcus Simon =

American politician (born 1970)

Member of the Virginia House of Delegates
- Incumbent
- Assumed office January 8, 2014
- Preceded by: Jim Scott
- Constituency: 53rd district (2014–2024); 13th district (2024–present)

Chair of the Virginia House of Delegates Privileges and Elections Committee
- Incumbent
- Assumed office January 2021
- Preceded by: Joseph C. Lindsey

Personal details
- Born: Marcus Bertram Simon; July 1, 1970 (age 56) Austin, Texas, U.S.
- Party: Democratic
- Spouse: Rachel Anne Goldstein
- Education: New York University (BA); American University (JD)
- Occupation: Lawyer
- Website: www.marcussimon.com

Military service
- Allegiance: United States
- Branch/service: United States Army
- Years of service: 1999–2003
- Rank: Captain
- Unit: J.A.G. Corps

Marcus Bertram Simon (born July 1, 1970) is an American lawyer and politician from Virginia. A member of the Democratic Party, Simon is the member of the Virginia House of Delegates for the 13th district, which includes Falls Church and parts of Fairfax County. His committee assignments include: Finance; Courts of Justice; Public Safety; and Communications, Technology and Innovation. He serves as Democratic Floor Leader for the House Democratic Caucus. He is appointed to the Freedom of Information Advisory Council. Simon was one of the eight legislators appointed to the 2021 Virginia Redistricting Commission, along with eight citizen members. As a lawyer, Simon was a member of the Judge Advocate General's Corps of the United States Army and currently owns his own law firm.

== Career ==
Simon received his bachelor's degree in journalism from New York University. He worked as an aide for Jim Scott while Scott served in the Virginia House of Delegates. In 1995, he went to work for Katherine Hanley, who served as chair of the Fairfax County Board of Supervisors. He attended night school as he received his juris doctor from American University Washington College of Law in 1999. He served in the Judge Advocate General's Corps of the United States Army for the next three years. Not wanting to remain a prosecutor, Simon entered real estate law in 2003. When the subprime mortgage crisis occurred in 2008, Simon and colleagues formed a law firm.

Scott announced he would not seek reelection in 2013, and immediately endorsed Simon as his successor. Simon won the seat in the 2013 elections.

=== Results ===
Virginia House of Delegates election: 53rd District, 2013
| Party | Candidate | Votes | % | ±% |
|---|---|---|---|---|
| Democratic | Marcus Simon | 13,726 | 66.71% | |
| Republican | W. Brad Tidwell | 5,965 | 28.99% | |
| Libertarian | Anthony G. Tellez | 852 | 4.14% | |
| Write-ins | | 33 | 0.16% | |
| Turnout | | 20,576 | 100.00% | |
| Democratic hold | | Swing | | |

== Personal ==
Simon's father, Samuel A. Simon, worked for Ralph Nader and was a member of "Nader's Raiders." He was one of the first 13 full-time lawyers to found the original Public Interest Research Group (PIRG). His mother was a teacher for the Fairfax County Public Schools. His parents live in McLean, Virginia.

Simon lives in Falls Church, Virginia, with his wife, Rachel, and two children, Emily and Zachary. He and his family attend Temple Rodef Shalom.
