= Virginia's 53rd House of Delegates district =

Virginia legislative district

District map from the 2023 election

Virginia's 53rd House of Delegates district, in Amherst County, Virginia, Bedford County, Virginia, and Nelson County, Virginia, elects one of the 100 members of the Virginia House of Delegates, the lower house of the state's bicameral legislature. The district was represented by Tim Griffin, a Republican, following the 2023 election, succeeding Marcus Simon, who was redistricted to the 13th district.

== District officeholders ==
Years	Delegate	Party
January 8, 1992 – January 8, 2014	Jim Scott	Democratic
January 8, 2014 – January 10, 2024	Marcus Simon	Democratic
January 10, 2024 – present	Tim Griffin	Republican

== Electoral history ==
In the 2017 Virginia House of Delegates election, incumbent Democrat Marcus Simon was challenged by independent Mike Casey and won re-election in District 53.

In the 2023 Virginia House of Delegates election, Republican Tim Griffin won the general election for District 53, defeating Democratic nominee Samuel R. Soghor with approximately 71% of the vote.

In the 2025 election cycle, Tim Griffin qualified as the Republican nominee for District 53 and Samuel R. Soghor qualified as the Democratic nominee for the November 4, 2025 general election.
