= Abbitt =

Abbitt is an English surname. Notable people with the surname include:

- Watkins Abbitt (1908–1998), American politician
- Watkins Abbitt Jr. (born 1944), American politician
