= Mark Keam =

American politician

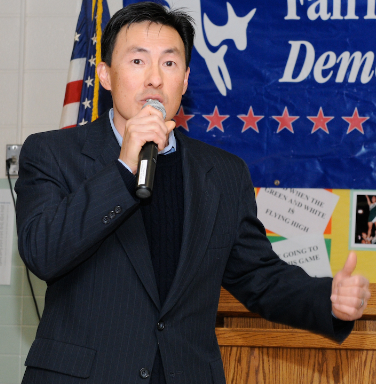
- Keam in January 2014

Member of the Virginia House of Delegates from the 35th district
- In office January 13, 2010 – September 6, 2022
- Preceded by: Steve Shannon
- Succeeded by: Holly Seibold

Personal details
- Born: May 10, 1966 (age 60) Seoul, South Korea
- Party: Democratic
- Spouse: Alex Seong Keam
- Education: Newington College; University of California, Irvine (B.A.); Hastings College of Law (J.D.)
- Profession: Attorney
- Committees: Agriculture, Chesapeake and Natural Resources; Education; Finance
- Website: www.markkeam.com

Mark Lee Keam (born May 10, 1966) is a Korean American lawyer. Since 2024 Keam has led the Korean American Institute. KAI is a nonprofit organization whose mission is to produce insightful and actionable research to improve decision making on issues facing Korean Americans.

He is a former member of the Virginia House of Delegates in the United States. A Democrat, Keam represented the 35th District, which encompassed a portion of Fairfax County, Virginia, including the town of Vienna, Virginia, where he resides. He resigned his seat on September 6, 2022, to take a position in the Biden administration as a deputy assistant secretary running the National Travel and Tourism Office in the International Trade Administration.

Keam was born in Seoul, South Korea, and has lived in Vietnam, Australia, and California. He was formerly an aide on Capitol Hill, and was an executive with Verizon Communications until he left in 2009 to run for the Virginia General Assembly.

== Early life and education ==
Keam was born on May 10, 1966, in Seoul, South Korea, to a Presbyterian minister. His family later founded a church in Vietnam, before fleeing when the country became communist in 1975. After arriving in Australia, Keam and his brother attended Newington College while their father was founding pastor of the Korean parish of the Uniting Church in Australia at Strathfield, New South Wales. The family eventually settled in Orange County, California. To help support his family, Keam worked odd jobs, from construction to collecting shopping carts in a retail parking lot. He earned a degree in political science from the University of California, Irvine, and later earned a Doctor of Jurisprudence from Hastings College of the Law.

== Career ==
Keam served as Senator Richard Durbin's chief counsel on the Senate Judiciary Committee from 2001 to 2007, when he left to join Verizon Communications as a Vice President and Counsel. In 2009, he took an unpaid leave of absence to run for the Virginia General Assembly.

=== Virginia House of Delegates ===
In 2009, Delegate Steve Shannon, the Democratic incumbent, did not seek reelection in the 35th district in order to run (unsuccessfully) for Attorney General of Virginia. Keam declared his intention to run for the seat. On Election day Mark Keam defeated Republican challenger James E. Hyland, making Keam the first Asian-born immigrant and the first Korean American elected to any state-level office in Virginia. He was sworn into office on January 13, 2010, at the Virginia State Capitol in Richmond, Virginia.

In February 2010, Keam and fellow freshman delegate James LeMunyon, a Republican, authored an op-ed in The Washington Post about their introduction of a bill to the General Assembly, which would attempt to make the voting records of General Assembly members more accessible to the public. The bill passed the House of Delegates 86 to 13 later that month. A State Senate committee carried the bill over for a year, and it has not yet been voted on.

He told a local newspaper in his district in January 2010 that he can legislate from an immigrant's point of view; saying that "I want to be able to speak on issues where people say, 'I've never met an immigrant in my life; I don't know what you guys think about it,'... I want to be able to say, 'Well, let me tell you what they think about it.'" He has also sponsored another bill which would raise the number of ESL, or "English as a second language" teachers in Virginia's schools from 17 full-time positions to 30 full-time positions for every 1,000 students.

Keam said in 2010 that he would abstain from voting on any bill which would pose a conflict of interest due to him being on an unpaid leave of absence from Verizon Communications, and he would not introduce any telecommunications legislation to the House of Delegates.

Keam was re-elected to his seat in Virginia's House of Delegates on November 7, 2017.

In 2021, Keam co-founded the General Assembly's first Asian American and Pacific Islander Caucus.

==== Committee assignments ====
Keam has served on the House committees on Agriculture, Chesapeake and Natural Resources (2012–); Education (2012–); Finance (2010–); and Militia, Police and Public Safety (2010–2011).

== Electoral history ==
| Date | Election | Candidate | Party | Votes | % |
Virginia House of Delegates, 35th district
| June 9, 2009 | Democratic primary | Mark L. Keam | | 3,653 | 55.05 |
| June 9, 2009 | Democratic primary | John F. Carroll | | 1,163 | 17.52 |
| June 9, 2009 | Democratic primary | Esam S. Omeish | | 1,050 | 15.82 |
| June 9, 2009 | Democratic primary | Roy J. Baldwin | | 769 | 11.59 |
| November 3, 2009 | General | Mark L. Keam | Democratic | 12,606 | 50.66 |
| November 3, 2009 | General | James E. "Jim" Hyland | Republican | 12,252 | 49.24 |
| November 3, 2009 | General | Write Ins | | 22 | 0.08 |
| November 3, 2009 | General | Steve Shannon ran for Attorney General; seat stayed Democratic | | | |
| November 8, 2011 | General | Mark L. Keam | Democratic | 9,636 | 96.17 |
| November 8, 2011 | General | Write Ins | | 383 | 3.82 |
