= 2009 Virginia Attorney General election =

- November 3, 2009
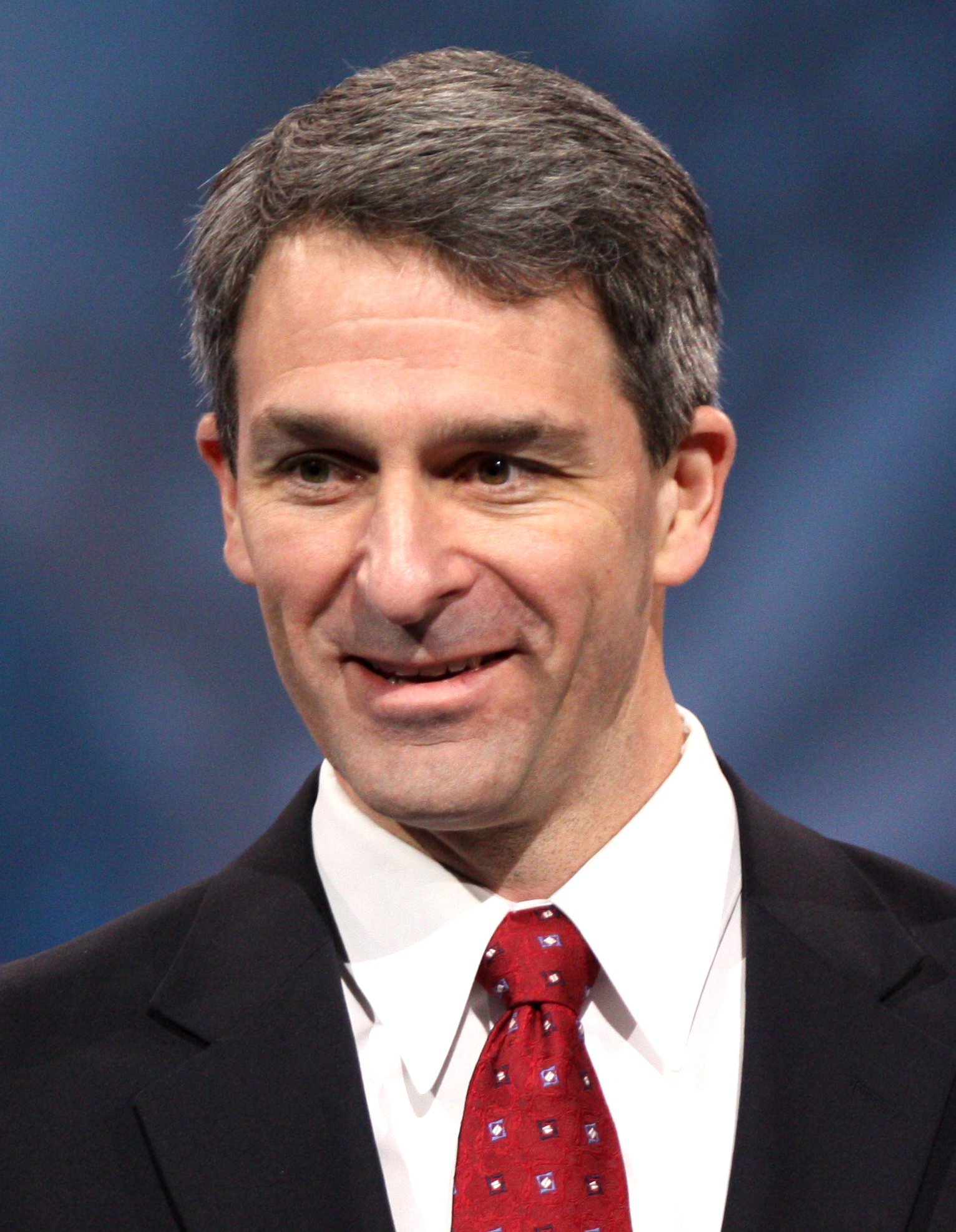

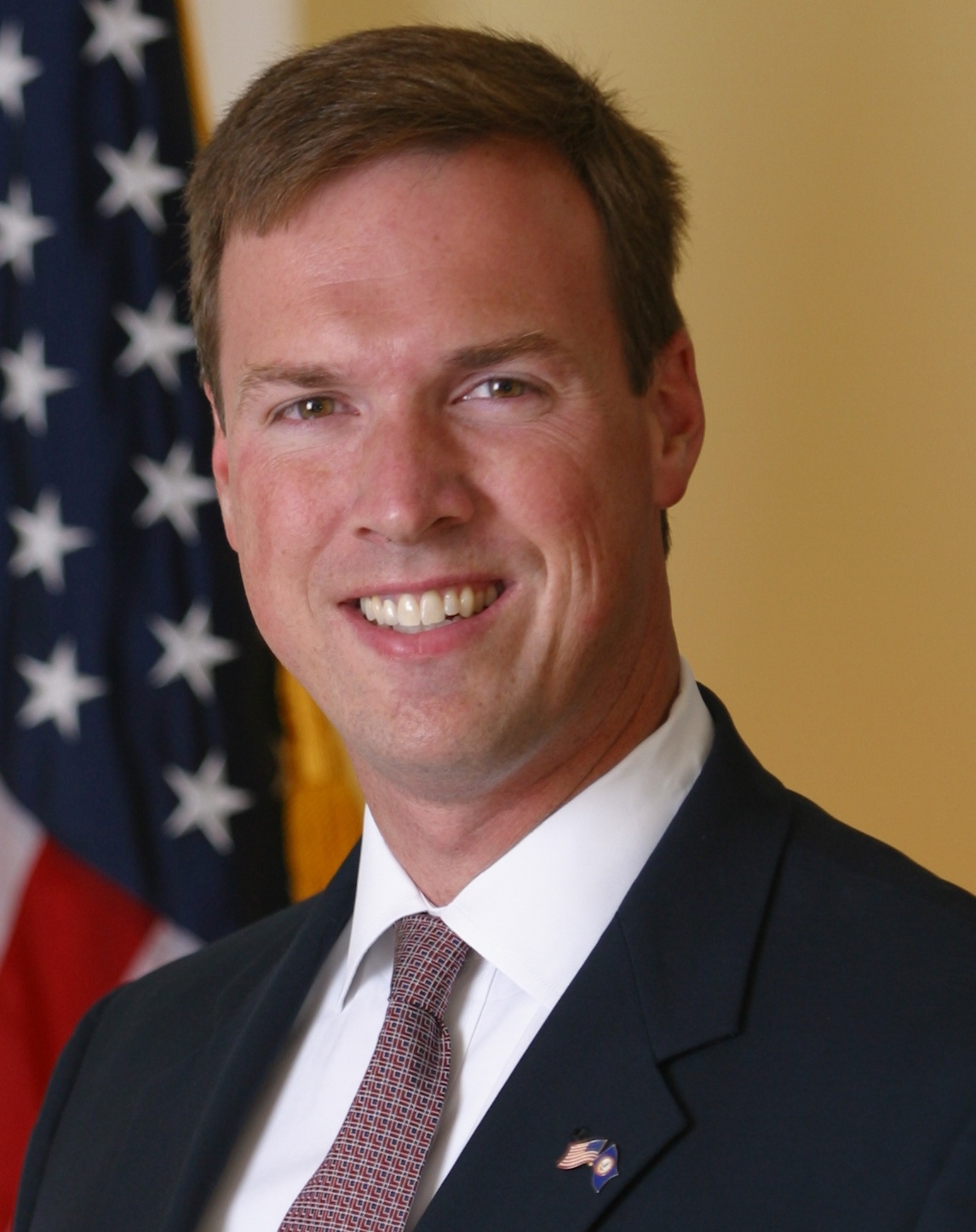
Nominee	Ken Cuccinelli	Steve Shannon
Party	Republican	Democratic
Popular vote	1,124,137	828,687
Percentage	57.5%	42.4%
- Cuccinelli: 50–60% 60–70% 70–80% 80–90% Shannon: 50–60% 60–70% 70–80%
Attorney General before election
Bob McDonnell
Republican
Elected Attorney General
Ken Cuccinelli
Republican

The 2009 Virginia attorney general election took place in Virginia on November 3, 2009. Incumbent Attorney General Bob McDonnell was eligible for re-election, but instead opted to successfully run for Governor of Virginia. McDonnell resigned from his position in 2009 to run for governor, being succeeded by his deputy, Bill Mims.

The Republican party nominated State Senator Ken Cuccinelli, who easily defeated the Democratic candidate, Delegate Steve Shannon. Concurrently, Republicans won the other two statewide offices and made gains in the House of Delegates. Cuccinelli would later make an unsuccessful run for governor in 2013.

This would be the last election until 2021 that a Republican would win the office of Attorney General in Virginia.

== Republican nomination ==
=== Candidates ===
==== Nominated at convention ====
- Ken Cuccinelli, Member of the Virginia Senate from the 37th district

==== Defeated at convention ====
- John L. Brownlee, former United States Attorney for the Western District of Virginia
- Dave Foster, former member of the Arlington County School Board

== Democratic primary ==
=== Candidates ===
==== Nominee ====
- Steve Shannon, Member of the Virginia House of Delegates from the 35th district and former Assistant Commonwealth's Attorney for Fairfax County, Virginia

==== Withdrew ====
- John P. Fishwick Jr., attorney

== See also ==
- 2009 Virginia elections
- 2009 Virginia gubernatorial election
- 2009 Virginia House of Delegates election
