= Briana Sewell =

American politician (born 1990)

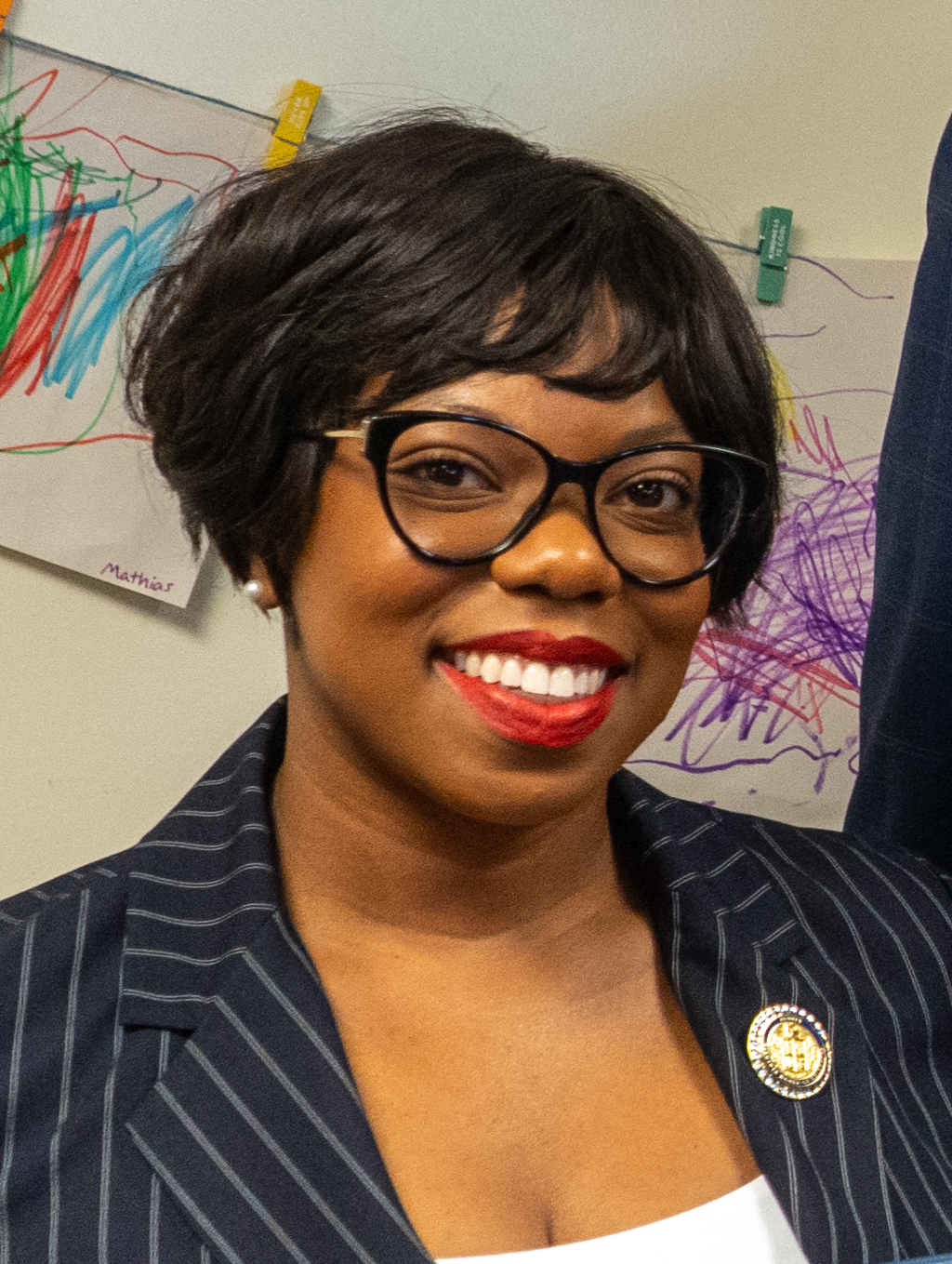
- Sewell in 2024

Member of the Virginia House of Delegates
- Incumbent
- Assumed office January 12, 2022
- Preceded by: Hala Ayala
- Constituency: 51st district (2022–2024); 25th district (2024–present)

Personal details
- Born: 1990 (age 35–36) Woodbridge, Virginia, U.S.
- Party: Democratic
- Relatives: Terri Sewell (cousin)
- Education: College of William & Mary (BA); American University (MPA)

Briana D. Sewell (born 1990) is an American politician serving as a member of the Virginia House of Delegates from the 25th district after serving the 51st district from 2022–2024. A member of the Democratic Party, she was first elected in 2021 to succeed retiring Democrat Hala Ayala. Sewell represents parts of Prince William County, including the towns of Lake Ridge and Nokesville.

== Early life and education ==
Sewell was born in 1990 in Woodbridge, Virginia. Both of her parents were members of the United States Air Force; at retirement, her father held the rank of senior master sergeant, while her mother attained the rank of lieutenant colonel. Her family was stationed in Panama for three years before moving to Lake Ridge, Virginia.

Sewell earned a Bachelor of Arts in public policy from the College of William & Mary. She later attended American University, where she earned a Master of Public Administration.

== Political career ==
Sewell began her career in politics as district director for U.S. Representative Gerry Connolly. In 2018, she established the Virginia Campaign for a Family Friendly Economy, an organization that advocates for paid parental leave, paid sick leaves, and affordable healthcare. Before becoming a legislator, she served as chief of staff to Ann Wheeler, the chair of the Prince William Board of County Supervisors.

=== Virginia House of Delegates ===
Sewell announced her candidacy for the 51st district in December 2020, shortly after incumbent Hala Ayala announced her retirement to run for Lieutenant Governor of Virginia. She received multiple endorsements, including from U.S. Senators Tim Kaine and Mark Warner, Congressman Gerry Connolly, and various state legislators, including Ayala herself. Sewell defeated her opponent, Republican U.S. Navy veteran Tim Cox, in the November 2021 general election by a margin of around 6.9 percentage points. She took office, along with the rest of the 162nd Virginia General Assembly, on January 12, 2022.

==== Committee assignments ====
- Committee on Appropriations
- Committee on Counties Cities and Towns
- Committee on Education - Chair of the Higher Education Subcommittee

== Congressional campaign ==
In November 2023, shortly after winning re-election to the redrawn 25th district, Sewell announced her candidacy for Virginia's 7th congressional district. The incumbent Congresswoman, Abigail Spanberger, announced her intention to retire in order to run for Governor of Virginia in 2025, creating an open race for her seat.

She would lose the Democratic primary to Eugene Vindman, who would go on to win the election against Republican Derrick Anderson.

== Personal life ==
She is the cousin of Terri Sewell, a U.S. Representative from Alabama.

Virginia House of Delegates
Preceded by Hala Ayala	Member of the Virginia House of Delegates from the 51st district 2022–2024	Succeeded by Eric Zehr
Preceded by Chris Runion	Member of the Virginia House of Delegates from the 25th district 2024–present	Incumbent
