= Virginia's 25th House of Delegates district =

Virginia legislative district

Virginia's 25th State House of Delegates district
- District map from the 2023 election
Delegate
Briana Sewell; D–Woodbridge
- Demographics: 59% White; 11% Black; 16% Hispanic; 9% Asian; 0% Native American; 0% Hawaiian/Pacific Islander; 1% Other; 5% Multiracial
- Population (2024) • Voting age: 86,864; 18
- Registered voters: 60,522

Virginia's 25th House of Delegates district elects one of 100 seats in the Virginia House of Delegates, the lower house of the state's bicameral legislature. District 25 represents part of Albemarle, Augusta and Rockingham counties. The seat is currently held by Democrat Briana Sewell.

== District officeholders ==
Years	Delegate	Party	Electoral history
January 1982 – January 10, 1996	Pete Giesen	Republican	Declined to seek reelection
January 10, 1996 – January 8, 2020	Steve Landes	Republican	First elected in 1995. Declined to seek reelection.
January 8, 2020 – January 10th, 2024	Chris Runion	Republican	First elected in 2019. Now represents Virginia's 35th House of Delegates district.
January 10th, 2024: present	Briana Sewell	Democrat	Elected to the 25th District in 2023.

== Electoral history ==
Date	Election	Candidate	Party	Votes	%
Virginia House of Delegates, 25th district
Nov 7, 1995	General	R S Landes	Republican	12,091	67.62
Nov 7, 1995	General	H L Nash III	Democratic	5,791	32.38
Nov 7, 1995	General	Pete Giesen retired; seat stayed Republican			
Nov 4, 1997	General	R. Steven "Steve" Landes	Republican	14,144	84.83
Nov 4, 1997	General	Sherry A. Stanley		2,528	15.16
Nov 4, 1997	General	Write Ins		1	0.01
Nov 2, 1999	General	R S Landes	Republican	8,063	76.59
Nov 2, 1999	General	S A Stanley		2,462	23.39
Nov 2, 1999	General	Write Ins		3	0.03
Nov 6, 2001	General	R S Landes	Republican	16,196	99.03
Nov 6, 2001	General	Write Ins		158	0.97
Nov 4, 2003	General	R S Landes	Republican	11,826	99.01
Nov 4, 2003	General	Write Ins		118	0.99
Nov 8, 2005	General	R S Landes	Republican	16,980	97.86
Nov 8, 2005	General	Write Ins		371	2.14
Nov 6, 2007	General	R. Steven "Steve" Landes	Republican	11,759	98.41
Nov 6, 2007	General	Write Ins		189	1.58
Nov 3, 2009	General	R. Steven "Steve" Landes	Republican	16,669	73.17
Nov 3, 2009	General	Greg J. Marrow	Democratic	6,093	26.74
Nov 3, 2009	General	Write Ins		17	0.07
Nov 8, 2011	General	R. Steven "Steve" Landes	Republican	12,912	97.65
Nov 8, 2011	General	Write Ins		310	2.34
