= Steve Landes =

American politician (born 1959)

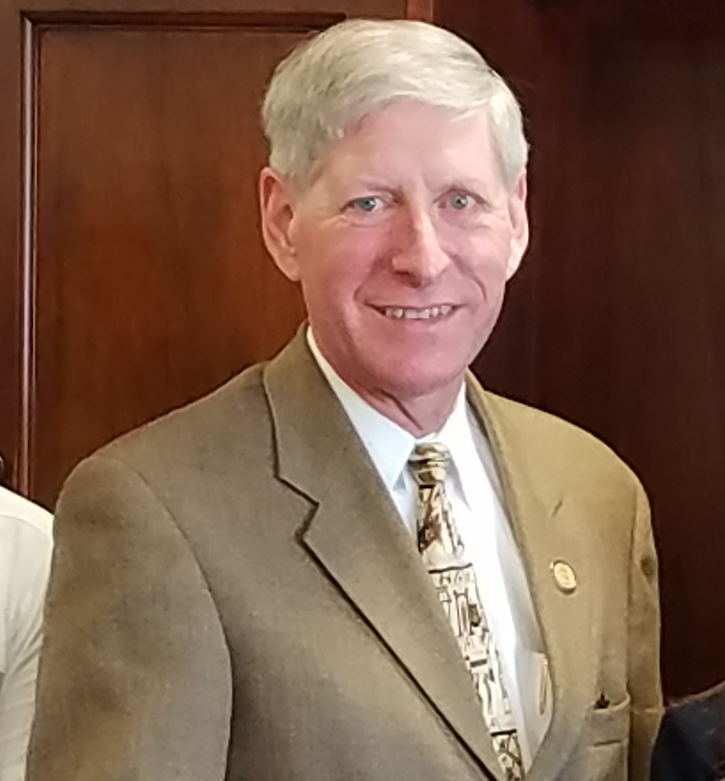

Member of the Virginia House of Delegates from the 25th district
- In office January 10, 1996 – January 8, 2020
- Preceded by: Pete Giesen
- Succeeded by: Chris Runion

Personal details
- Born: Richard Steven Landes; November 15, 1959 (age 66) Staunton, Virginia, U.S.
- Party: Republican
- Spouse: Angela Beth Hochmeister
- Children: Roth
- Education: Virginia Commonwealth University
- Occupation: Market development
- Committees: Appropriations; Education; Privileges and Elections; Rules
- Website: www.stevelandes.com

Richard Steven Landes (born November 15, 1959) is an American politician. He served in the Virginia House of Delegates from 1996 to 2020, representing the 25th district in the Blue Ridge Mountains, including parts of Albemarle, Augusta and Rockingham Counties. He currently serves as the elected Clerk of the Circuit Court for Augusta County. He is a member of the Republican Party.

Landes served as chairman of the House Education Committee and is the first non-attorney to serve as chairman and member of the Virginia Code Commission. In 2019, he announced his retirement and intention to run for clerk of court for Augusta County.

Landes was legislative assistant to Delegate Pete Giesen from 1988 to 1992 and district director and representative for U.S. Representative Bob Goodlatte from 1993 to 1995.

== Electoral history ==
Date	Election	Candidate	Party	Votes	%
Virginia House of Delegates, 25th district
Nov 7, 1995	General	R S Landes	Republican	12,091	67.62
Nov 7, 1995	General	H L Nash III	Democratic	5,791	32.38
Nov 7, 1995	General	Pete Giesen retired; seat stayed Republican			
Nov 4, 1997	General	R. Steven "Steve" Landes	Republican	14,144	84.83
Nov 4, 1997	General	Sherry A. Stanley		2,528	15.16
Nov 4, 1997	General	Write Ins		1	0.01
Nov 2, 1999	General	R S Landes	Republican	8,063	76.59
Nov 2, 1999	General	S A Stanley		2,462	23.39
Nov 2, 1999	General	Write Ins		3	0.03
Nov 6, 2001	General	R S Landes	Republican	16,196	99.03
Nov 6, 2001	General	Write Ins		158	0.97
Nov 4, 2003	General	R S Landes	Republican	11,826	99.01
Nov 4, 2003	General	Write Ins		118	0.99
Nov 8, 2005	General	R S Landes	Republican	16,980	97.86
Nov 8, 2005	General	Write Ins		371	2.14
Nov 6, 2007	General	R. Steven "Steve" Landes	Republican	11,759	98.41
Nov 6, 2007	General	Write Ins		189	1.58
Nov 3, 2009	General	R. Steven "Steve" Landes	Republican	16,669	73.17
Nov 3, 2009	General	Greg J. Marrow	Democratic	6,093	26.74
Nov 3, 2009	General	Write Ins		17	0.07
Nov 8, 2011	General	R. Steven "Steve" Landes	Republican	12,912	97.65
Nov 8, 2011	General	Write Ins		310	2.34
