= Eric Zehr =

American politician from Virginia

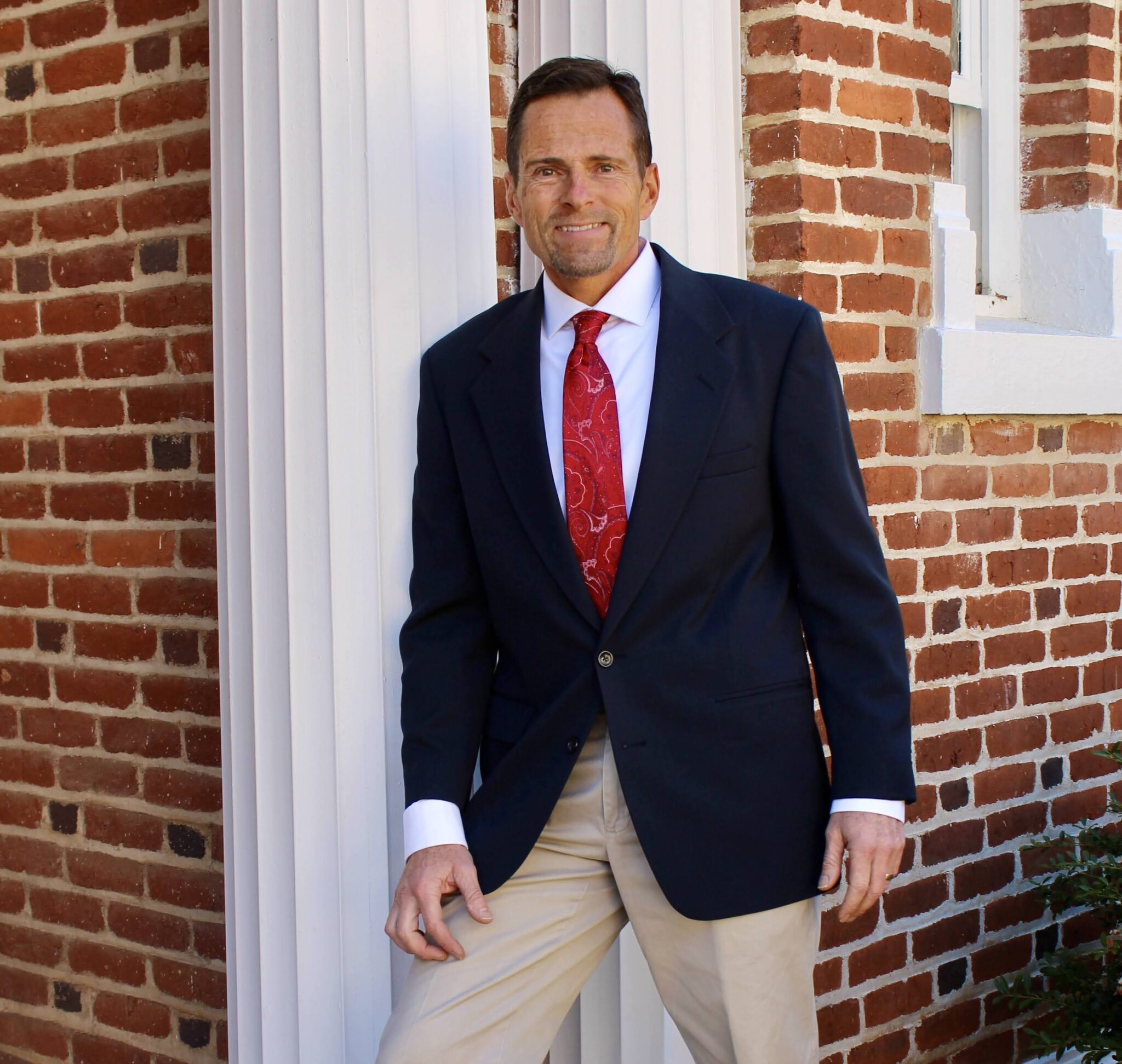

Member of the Virginia House of Delegates from the 51st district
- Incumbent
- Assumed office January 10, 2024
- Preceded by: Briana Sewell (redistricting)

Personal details
- Party: Republican

Eric Zehr is a Republican state legislator in Virginia. He was elected to the Virginia House of Delegates in the 2023 Virginia House of Delegates election from the 51st district following census based redistricting. Before serving in the state legislature, Zehr was a member of the Campbell County Board of Supervisors from 2013 to 2017, and chaired the local Republican Party from 2015 to 2018. He was also chair of the 59th House District Republican Committee from 2016 to 2021. In the November 2023 election, he won 69% of the votes cast and defeated his Democratic rival and former 59th district Republican incumbent Matt Fariss, who faced significant legal troubles yet ran as an Independent.

== Electoral history ==
2013 Board of Supervisors Election (Rustburg District):
Party	Candidate	Votes	%
Republican	Eric Zehr	1,273	53.70
Independent	Hugh Pendleton (incumbent)	1,092	46.00

2017 Board of Supervisors Election (Rustburg District):
Party	Candidate	Votes	%
Republican	Eric Zehr (incumbent)	1,308	48.90
Independent	Jon Hardie	1,363	50.90

2023 Virginia House of Delegates election for the 51st District:
Party	Candidate	Votes	%
Republican	Eric Zehr	10,205	69.50
Democrat	Kimberly Moran	3,237	22.05%
Independent	Matt Fariss (incumbent)	1,213	8.26%
Write-in		28	.19%

On April 3, 2025, Zehr was named the Republican nominee after being unopposed by any other Republican at the filing deadline.
