= Allie Ray Hull =

American politician (1915–2006)

Member of the Virginia House of Delegates from the 10th district
- In office January 13, 1982 – January 12, 1983 Serving with Pete Giesen
- Preceded by: Bill Wilson
- Succeeded by: Mary Sue Terry

Personal details
- Born: June 24, 1915 Hightown, Virginia, U.S.
- Died: December 11, 2006 (aged 91) Staunton, Virginia, U.S.
- Party: Republican
- Spouse: Virginia Burns

Military service
- Allegiance: United States
- Branch/service: U.S. Army Air Forces
- Years of service: 1942–1946
- Rank: Sergeant
- Battles/wars: World War II

Allie Ray Hull (June 24, 1915 – December 11, 2006) was an American Republican politician. After many years on the Augusta County Board of Supervisors, he was elected to the Virginia House of Delegates in 1981.
