= Pete Giesen =

American politician (1932–2021)

Member of the Virginia House of Delegates
- In office January 14, 1976 – January 10, 1996 Serving with Erwin S. Solomon (1976‍–‍1982); Allie Ray Hull (1982‍–‍1983)
- Preceded by: Marshall Coleman
- Succeeded by: Steve Landes
- Constituency: 15th district (1976‍–‍1982); 10th district (1982‍–‍1983); 25th district (1983‍–‍1996)
- In office January 8, 1964 – September 11, 1974 Serving with George M. Cochran (1964‍–‍1966); O. Beverley Roller (1966‍–‍1972); Marshall Coleman (1972‍–‍1974)
- Preceded by: Felix E. Edmunds
- Succeeded by: Erwin S. Solomon
- Constituency: 10th district (1964‍–‍1972); 15th district (1972‍–‍1974)

House Minority Leader
- In office January 12, 1972 – September 11, 1974
- Preceded by: M. Caldwell Butler
- Succeeded by: Jerry H. Geisler

Personal details
- Born: Arthur Rossa Giesen Jr. August 8, 1932 Radford, Virginia, U.S.
- Died: April 2, 2021 (aged 88)
- Party: Republican
- Parent: Charlotte Giesen (mother)
- Education: Yale University (BA); Harvard University (MBA)
- Occupation: Businessman; educator; politician

Arthur Rossa "Pete" Giesen Jr. (August 8, 1932 – April 2, 2021) was an American politician and businessman, who represented (part time) a district in the Blue Ridge Mountains including Waynesboro, Virginia in the Virginia House of Delegates as a Republican for more than three decades.

== Early and family life ==
Giesen was born in Radford, Virginia on August 8, 1932, to Arthur Rossa Giesen and his wife, Charlotte Giesen (née Charlotte Milton Caldwell), during the Great Depression. He attended Yale University, where he received his bachelor's degree in 1954. He then went on to earn his MBA from Harvard Business School in 1956.

Both of his parents served on the Radford city council, with his father serving as Radford's mayor for a time. During the Massive Resistance crisis, the Democratic Byrd Organization proposed the closure of Virginia's public schools in an effort to prevent racial desegregation required by the United States Supreme Court decision in Brown v. Board of Education. Giesen's mother was editor of the Women's page in the local newspaper, ran against the incumbent Byrd Democrat, and won election to the Virginia House of Delegates in 1958.

Pete Giesen married Dorothy, with whom he had three sons and three daughters, but later divorced her and married Patricia Elliot.

== Career ==
Giesen served as President and Treasurer of the Augusta Steel Corporation, as well as vice-president of the Giesen-Caldwell Agency, Inc. He later formed the New Options Group, Inc. in Waynesboro, Virginia and served on the executive boards of both the Augusta Steel Corporation and the Virginia-Central Valley Bank (that merged with Crestar Bank). Active in his Lutheran Church, he served on the national executive council from 1978 to 1982 as well as helped found the Innsbrook Kiwanis Club in 1990 (having previously been a member of the Verona Kiwanis Club).

He continued the family's political tradition by running for the Virginia House of Delegates as a Republican in 1961 to represent Waynesboro, but initially came in third in a two-member district. Two years later, in 1963, he came in second, since Democrat Felix E. Edmunds, who had come in second the previous election (and had only lost in 1955 because the district had briefly become a single-candidate one), had decided to concentrate on his legal practice. While Giesen still couldn't outpoll Democrat George M. Cochran (who had bucked the Byrd Machine during Massive Resistance), he did outpoll Harry L. Nash Jr. and was seated in the House of Delegates.

Voters re-elected Giesen multiple times. Initially Waynesboro area voters elected Giesen from what was numbered the 10th District, but which became the 15th after the 1970 census reapportionment, and was briefly the 10th district again in 1981, but finally became the 25th district. Giesen had risen to assistant minority leader and then minority leader. On September 11, 1974, he resigned his House seat and leadership position, hoping to win the special election to succeed H. Dunlop Dawbarn in the state senate. Thanks in part to another redistricting and the Watergate Scandal, which led to the Democratic landslide of 1974, engineer Frank W. Nolen defeated Giesen by 405 votes. Giesen subsequently ran successfully for his old House seat in 1975. He served during most of the 1970s with Bath County's former Commonwealth attorney, Democrat Erwin S. Solomon, in a two-member district. Giesen handily defeated Democrat Thomas E. Roberts in 1985, and faced no opposition in 1982, 1983, 1987, 1991 or 1993 as his district became the 25th (and Solomon remained in the single-member 15th). Giesen served in the part-time position until 1996, and was replaced by his former legislative aide, R. Steven Landes.

From 2007 until his death, Giesen taught courses on state and local government at James Madison University in Harrisonburg, about 20 miles north of his Augusta County home.

Arthur Rossa "Pete" Giesen, Jr. died on Friday, April 2, 2021, at the age of 88.
