= Holly Seibold =

Virginia politician

Member of the Virginia House of Delegates
- Incumbent
- Assumed office January 11, 2023
- Preceded by: Mark Keam
- Constituency: 35th district (2023–2024); 12th district (2024–present)

Personal details
- Party: Democratic
- Website: hollyseibold.com

Holly Seibold is a Virginia politician and educator. She is a Democratic member of the Virginia House of Delegates in the 12th district. She was elected following a January 2023 special election to fill Virginia's 35th House of Delegates district, which became vacant following the resignation of Democrat Mark Keam.

== Political career ==
On September 6, 2022, Democrat Mark Keam, who represented the 35th district in the Virginia House of Delegates, resigned to take a position in the Biden administration. Keam's resignation lead to a special election for the seat. Seibold ran for the seat and defeated Karl V. Frisch in the Democratic party's nomination caucus, which was held on November 8, 2022. She won the general election, held on January 10, 2023, defeating Republican candidate Monique Baroudi. She was sworn in on January 11, 2023.

== Personal life ==
Seibold has lived in Vienna, Virginia since 2012.

== Electoral history ==
2023 Virginia's 35th House of Delegates district special Democratic caucus
Party	Candidate	Votes	%
Democratic	Holly M. Seibold	1,210	51.42%
Democratic	Karl V. Frisch	1,143	48.58%
Total votes		2,353	100%

2023 Virginia's 35th House of Delegates district special election
Party	Candidate	Votes	%
Democratic	Holly M. Seibold	7,321	67.25%
Republican	Monique Baroudi	3,555	32.65%
Total votes		10,876	100.00
Democratic hold			
