= Matt Fariss =

American politician (born 1968)

Member of the Virginia House of Delegates from the 59th district
- In office January 11, 2012 – January 10, 2024
- Preceded by: Watkins Abbitt, Jr.
- Succeeded by: Eric Zehr (redistricting)

Personal details
- Born: Charles Matthew Fariss; May 11, 1968 (age 58) Lynchburg, Virginia, U.S.
- Party: Independent (2023–present)
- Other political affiliations: Republican (2011–2023)
- Spouse: Crystal Dawn Brown
- Children: Hunter, Bobby, Harrison
- Occupation: Farmer, businessperson
- Committees: Agriculture, Chesapeake and Natural Resources; Militia, Police and Public Safety

Charles Matthew Fariss (born May 11, 1968) is an American businessman and politician. He represented the 59th district, made up of Appomattox County and Buckingham counties, and parts of Albemarle, Campbell, and Nelson counties between Charlottesville and Lynchburg. He was first elected to the Virginia House of Delegates in 2011 as a Republican.

After being charged with several crimes in 2023, he became an independent candidate in the 2023 election, coming in third.

== Early life, education, business career ==
Fariss grew up on a farm. After graduating from Rustburg High School, he went into farming himself, and expanded into other related businesses, including co-ownership of the Lynchburg Livestock Market.

Fariss married Crystal Dawn Brown. They have three children, Hunter, Bobby and Harrison.

== Political career ==
In 2011, the 59th district incumbent, independent Watkins Abbitt, Jr., announced his retirement after 26 years of service. Fariss, the Republican nominee, won a three-way race against Democrat Connie Brennan and independent Linda M. Wall, receiving 52.98% of the vote. Fariss labeled himself as a social conservative, opposing abortion, as well as same-sex marriage.

In October 2019, Fariss potentially violated Virginia campaign finance code by holding a fundraiser via raffle.

In 2022, Virginia's legislature reapportioned legislative districts following the U.S. Federal census, after which the 59th district covered counties substantially north and east of what had been Fariss' district, and the counties that had been in his district were now in the 51st legislative district. On June 20, 2023, Fariss filed for reelection as an independent after missing the GOP Legislative District Committee's March 30 deadline amidst his legal troubles.

On November 7, 2023, Fariss finished a distant third in a three-way race, losing to both Republican nominee and winner Eric Zehr (who won 69% of votes cast) as well as Democratic nominee Kimberly Moran (22%). Fariss only won approximately 8% of the votes cast.

== Legal troubles ==
In January 2016, Fariss was charged with two incidents. These included a misdemeanor breach of peace and a hit and run accident in which property was damaged but no people were hurt.

In April 2023, Fariss was charged with malicious wounding, failing to stop after an accident, and reckless driving after striking a woman with his SUV the previous month. Prior to striking the woman, Fariss had been angrily demanding that the woman get back into his vehicle after she left his vehicle on foot to get away from him. Fariss fled after a bystander who witnessed the scene shouted out. On March 5, 2024, Fariss was found not guilty on all three charges but was convicted of the lesser charge of improper driving and ordered to pay $500.

Fariss was arrested on March 23, 2024, on felony charges for possession of methamphetamines and a firearm, and a misdemeanor charge of violating a protective order. Initially held without bail, he was released on bond on April 2 subject to drug testing. An October 1 bail review hearing revealed that Fariss had tested positive for drugs but the court gave him another chance. Fariss was arrested again on October 25 following another positive drug test. Fariss was jailed and was sentenced to time served after pleading guilty on November 13.
