= Virginia's 35th House of Delegates district =

Virginia legislative district

Virginia's State House of Delegates district
- District map from the 2023 election
Delegate
Chris Runion; R–Bridgewater
- Demographics: 86% White; 4% Black; 6% Hispanic; 1% Asian; 0% Native American; 0% Hawaiian/Pacific Islander; 0% Other; 3% Multiracial
- Population (2024) • Voting age: 89,236; 18
- Registered voters: 63,319

Virginia's 35th House of Delegates district elects one of 100 seats in the Virginia House of Delegates, the lower house of the state's bicameral legislature. District 35, in the Shenandoah Valley, is currently represented by Republican Chris Runion since 2024.

== Elections ==
Important to note - all this data reflects the old District 35, near Fairfax. The 35th District used to be the 26th. Mark Keam narrowly defeated James Hyland in 2007. He defeated mechanical engineer Leiann Leppin Luse in 2013. In that election, Luse had run on a platform of cutting taxes and regulations.

== District officeholders ==
Years	Delegate	Party	Electoral history
January 14, 1998 – January 3, 2004	Jeannemarie Devolites Davis	Republican	Declined to run for reelection; Elected to the Senate of Virginia
January 3, 2004 – January 13, 2009	Steve Shannon	Democratic	Resigned; Unsuccessfully ran for Attorney General of Virginia
January 13, 2010 – September 6, 2022	Mark Keam	Democratic	Elected via special election; resigned take a position in the Biden Administration.
January 13, 2023 – January 10, 2024	Holly Seibold	Democratic	Elected via special election. Redistricted to the 12th district.
January 10, 2024 – present	Chris Runion	Republican	
