= Watkins Abbitt Jr. =

American politician

Member of the Virginia House of Delegates from the 59th district
- In office January 8, 1986 – January 11, 2012
- Preceded by: Claude W. Anderson
- Succeeded by: Matt Fariss

Personal details
- Born: Watkins Moorman Abbitt Jr. October 20, 1944 (age 81) Appomattox, Virginia, U.S.
- Party: Democratic (until 2001); Independent (since 2001)
- Spouse: Madeline I. Ganley
- Parent: Watkins Abbitt (father)
- Education: Ferrum Junior College; Virginia Commonwealth University
- Occupation: Insurance; real estate

Watkins Moorman Abbitt Jr. (born October 20, 1944) is an American politician. He is a former member of the Virginia House of Delegates.

== Biography ==
Abbitt was born in Appomattox, Virginia. He attended Ferrum College in Ferrum, Virginia, and earned a BS in economics from Virginia Commonwealth University in Richmond, Virginia. He was elected to the Virginia House of Delegates in 1985 and served from 1986 until his retirement in 2012. He did not seek re-election in 2011 and was succeeded by Matt Fariss. The American Conservative Union gave him a 100% evaluation in 2011.

Originally a Democrat, he switched to independent status in 2001 and started caucusing with the Republicans. Until 2012, Abbitt represented the 59th district in the Virginia Piedmont, including four counties and parts of three others.

Abbitt and his wife Madeline Ganley resided in Appomattox, Virginia.

Abbitt's father, Watkins Abbitt Sr., was a member of the United States House of Representatives 1948–1973.
