= Hala Ayala =

American politician (born 1973)

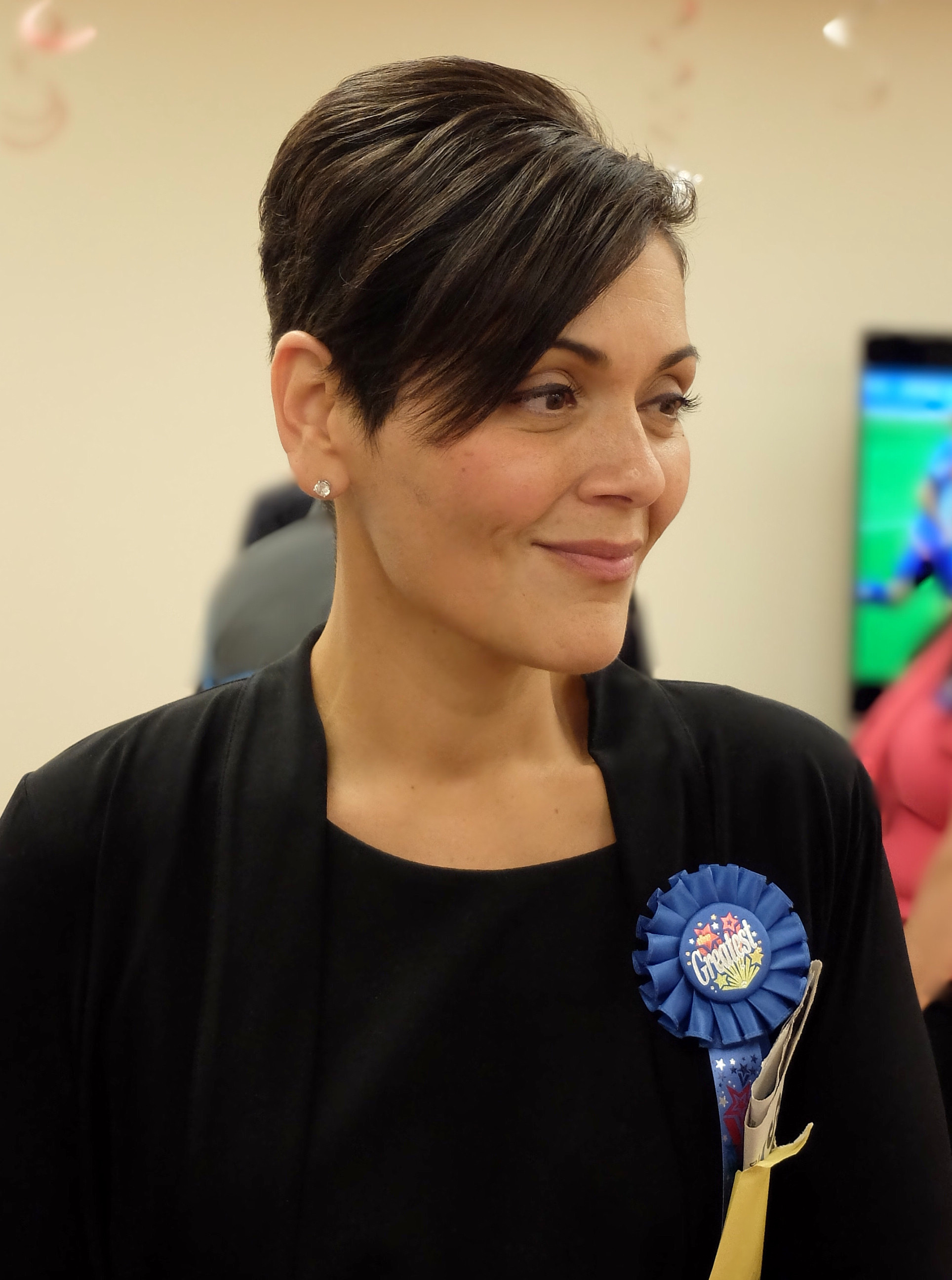
- Ayala in 2017

Member of the Virginia House of Delegates from the 51st district
- In office January 10, 2018 – January 12, 2022
- Preceded by: Rich Anderson
- Succeeded by: Briana Sewell

Personal details
- Born: April 23, 1973 (age 53) Alexandria, Virginia, U.S.
- Party: Democratic
- Children: 2
- Education: University of Phoenix (AS)

Hala Sophia Ayala (born April 23, 1973) is an American politician who served as a member of the Virginia House of Delegates for the 51st district from 2018 to 2022. She was the Democratic nominee in the 2021 Virginia lieutenant gubernatorial election, losing to Republican nominee Winsome Earle-Sears. Ayala was also a candidate for Virginia State Senate in the 33rd district, losing the Democratic primary to Jennifer Carroll Foy on June 20, 2023.

== Early life and education ==
Ayala was born in Alexandria, Virginia. She graduated from Woodbridge Senior High School, and has an associate’s degree in psychology from the University of Phoenix.

Ayala's father was an immigrant from El Salvador, and also has North African roots. Ayala's mother was Irish and Lebanese. When Ayala was pregnant, her job did not offer any health insurance but she qualified for Medicaid, which provided healthcare for her and her son.

== Career ==
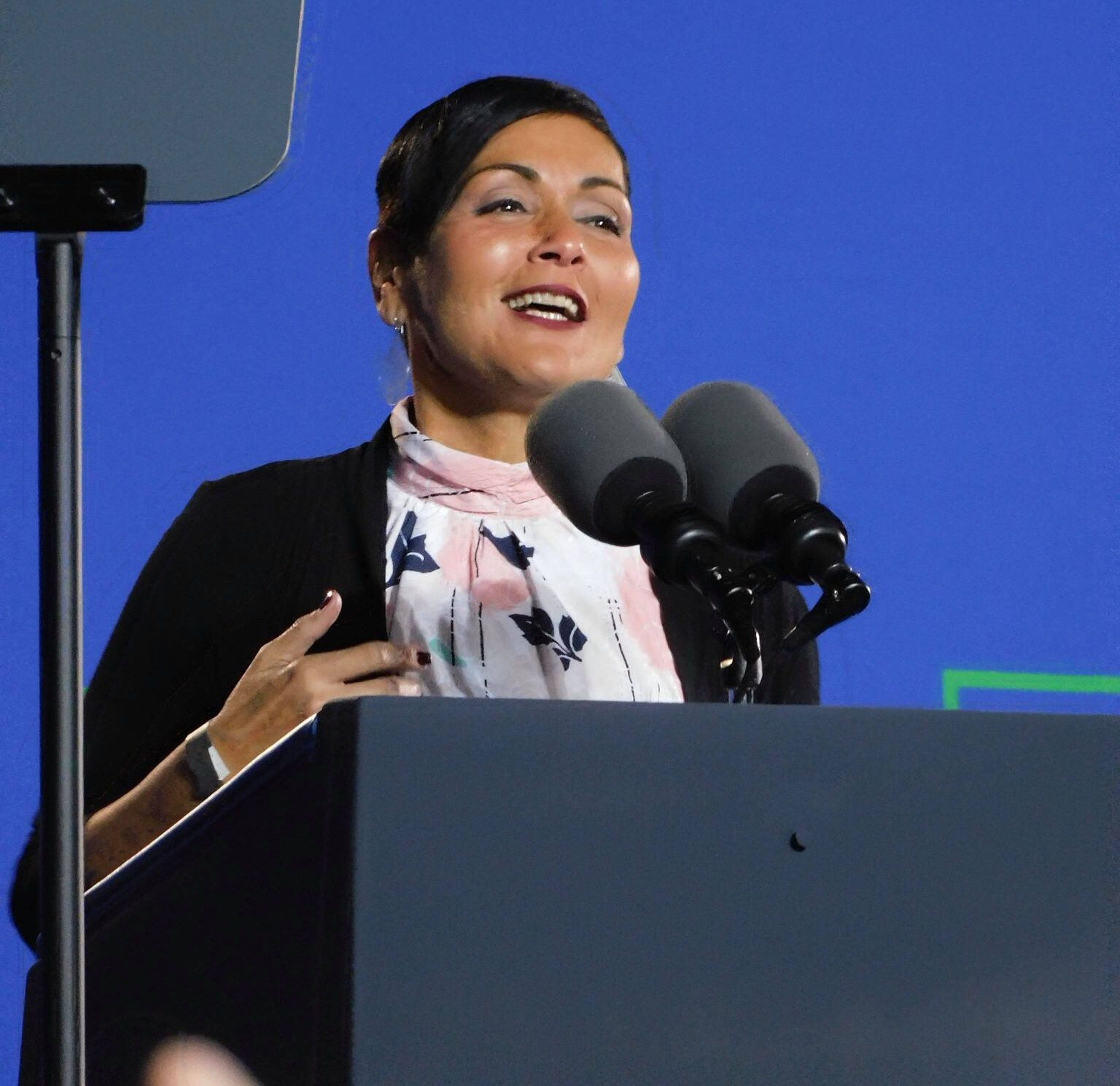
Ayala at a campaign rally for Lieutenant Governor in 2021

Ayala formerly worked for the United States Department of Homeland Security as a cybersecurity specialist. She also formerly led the Prince William County chapter of the National Organization for Women, serving as chapter president in 2014. She also served on the Virginia Council on Women as an appointee of Governor Terry McAuliffe for a term expiring on June 30, 2016.

Ayala cites the documentary Miss Representation as inspiration for her to become involved in politics, and was a volunteer for Barack Obama's reelection campaign in 2012. In 2017, Ayala was an organizer of the Women's March against Donald Trump.

=== Virginia House of Delegates ===
Ayala ran for the Virginia House of Delegates in the 2017 elections for the 51st district, which covers much of Prince William County. The district specifically stretches "from just northwest of Occoquan, in eastern Prince William, to Nokesville on the county's western border." District 51 was a key pickup target for Virginia Democrats because it was one of 17 House of Delegates districts that voted for Hillary Clinton in the preceding year's presidential election, but was held by a Republican state house delegate. In June 2017, Ayala won the Democratic nomination for the 51st district of the Virginia House of Delegates, defeating Ken Boddye in the primary election. In the general election, Ayala defeated four-term Republican incumbent Richard L. Anderson. Ayala and Elizabeth Guzman became the first Hispanic women elected to the House. The victories were part of a Democratic sweep in the 2017 Virginia elections, which saw major gains for the party.

=== Lieutenant gubernatorial campaign ===
In July 2020, Ayala announced her candidacy for Lieutenant Governor of Virginia in the 2021 election. In December 2020, she announced she would not seek reelection to her House of Delegates seat. In June 2021, Ayala became the Democratic nominee for Lieutenant Governor of Virginia. She lost the November election to Winsome Sears.

=== Virginia State Senate election ===
In March 2022, Ayala announced her candidacy for Virginia State Senate for the 33rd District. She lost the June 2023 primary election to Jennifer Carroll Foy.

== Legislative initiatives ==
Drawing on her 18 years as an information security specialist for the U.S. Coast Guard, Ayala has made information and cyber security one focus of her efforts. Her bill requiring tax preparers to report security breaches became law. Ayala has also introduced bills for creating a state interagency cybersecurity task force, training state employees, increasing security of network-connected devices, and requiring digital services to remove information about minors upon request.

=== Committee assignments ===
Ayala served as a member of the Science and Technology Committee and the Finance Committee.

== Electoral history ==
Year	Office	Party	Votes for Ayala	%	Opponent	Party	Votes	%
2017	Virginia House of Delegates	✓ Democratic	15,244	52.98%	Rich Anderson (inc.)	Republican	13,476	46.84%
2019	Virginia House of Delegates	✓ Democratic	15,508	54.58%	Rich Anderson	Republican	12,882	45.34%
2021	Lieutenant Governor of Virginia	Democratic	1,608,030	49.1%	Winsome Sears	✓ Republican	1,658,332	50.8%
2023	Virginia Senate	Democratic	5,473	37.15%	Jennifer Carroll Foy	✓ Democratic	9,259	62.85%

== Personal life ==
Ayala lives in Lake Ridge, Virginia. She has two children.

Virginia House of Delegates
Preceded by Rich Anderson	Member of the Virginia House of Delegates from the 51st district 2018–2022	Succeeded by Briana Sewell
Party political offices
Preceded by Justin Fairfax	Democratic nominee for Lieutenant Governor of Virginia; 2021	Succeeded by Ghazala Hashmi
