= Virginia's 51st House of Delegates district =

Virginia legislative district

District map from the 2023 election

Virginia's 51st House of Delegates district, in Campbell County, Virginia, Bedford County, Virginia, and Pittsylvania County, Virginia, elects one of the 100 members of the Virginia House of Delegates, the lower house of the state's bicameral legislature.

The 51st district has been represented by Republican Eric Zehr since 2024.

== District officeholders ==
Years	Delegate	Party	Electoral history
January 16, 1998 – January 9, 2008	M. B. McQuigg	Republican	Declined to run for reelection
January 9, 2008 – January 13, 2010	Paul F. Nichols	Democratic	Defeated in bid for reelection
January 13, 2010 – January 10, 2018	Rich Anderson	Republican	Defeated in bid for reelection
January 10, 2018 – January 12, 2022	Hala Ayala	Democratic	First elected in 2017
January 12, 2022 – present	Briana Sewell	Democratic	Redistricting
January 10, 2024 – present	Eric Zehr	Republican	Incumbent

== Electoral history ==
In the 2023 Virginia House of Delegates election, Eric Zehr, a Republican and former Campbell County Supervisor, announced his candidacy for Delegate of District 51 following redistricting in the Commonwealth. Zehr secured the Republican nomination and ran in the general election against Democratic nominee Kimberly A. Moran and Independent former incumbent Matt Fariss, who ran outside the Republican primary after missing the filing deadline. Zehr won the general election with approximately 73% of the vote, defeating both opponents and flipping the seat back to Republican control. He was sworn in as the Delegate for the 51st district on January 10, 2024.

In the 2025 election cycle, Zehr was again the Republican nominee for District 51. Joy A. Powers ran as the Democratic nominee. As of the candidate qualification list for the November 4, 2025 general election, both Zehr and Powers were qualified candidates for the seat.
