= Watkins Abbitt =

American politician and lawyer

Watkins M. Abbitt
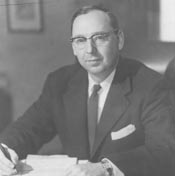

Member of the U.S. House of Representatives from Virginia's 4th district
- In office February 17, 1948 – January 3, 1973
- Preceded by: Patrick H. Drewry
- Succeeded by: Robert Daniel

Chair of the Democratic Party of Virginia
- In office 1964–1970
- Preceded by: Thomas H. Blanton
- Succeeded by: William G. Thomas

Commonwealth's Attorney for Appomattox County
- In office December 1, 1932 – February 2, 1948
- Preceded by: Joel W. Flood
- Succeeded by: George F. Abbitt

Personal details
- Born: Watkins Moorman Abbitt; May 21, 1908 Lynchburg, Virginia, U.S.
- Died: July 13, 1998 (aged 90) Lynchburg, Virginia, U.S.
- Resting place: Appomattox, Virginia, U.S.
- Party: Democratic
- Spouses: Corinne Hancock (died 1989); Mary Ann Schmidt
- Children: 3, including Watkins Jr.
- Education: University of Richmond (LLB)
- Occupation: Lawyer; banker; politician

Watkins Moorman "Wat" Abbitt (May 21, 1908 – July 13, 1998) was an American politician and lawyer. He was a member of the United States House of Representatives from Virginia from February 17, 1948 to January 3, 1973. He was a top lieutenant within the Byrd Organization, the political machine named for its leader, U.S. Senator Harry F. Byrd.

== Early and family life ==
Abbitt was born in Lynchburg, Virginia to George Francis Abbitt and Otway C. Moorman Abbitt. He graduated from Appomattox Agricultural High School in Appomattox, Virginia in 1925. He earned an LL.B. from the University of Richmond in 1931 and began the practice of law in Appomattox. He married Corinne Hancock on March 20, 1937, and they had a son and two daughters who survived infancy.

== Career ==
Upon admission to the Virginia bar, Abbitt had a private legal practice, and was also a bank executive. In 1931 he was elected Commonwealth's attorney for Appomattox County and served from 1932 to 1948. He also was elected member of the Virginia Constitutional Convention in 1945.

=== Congress ===
When U.S. Representative Patrick H. Drewry died in office, Abbit won the special election to fill the vacancy. A Democrat, Abbitt won a full term later that year and 11 more times after that (February 17, 1948 – January 3, 1973). He was a member of the Agriculture Committee and chair of its Subcommittee on Tobacco from 1955 on, an issue of great importance to his district. He supported farm subsidies as well as fiscal conservatism and opposed increased federal intervention in state affairs. Abbitt became known for his opposition to school desegregation in the 1950s, supporting massive resistance alongside other Byrd Democrats. For instance, he denounced Brown v. Board of Education as "the naked and arrogant declaration of nine men." Abbitt signed the Southern Manifesto in 1956. Abbitt voted against the Civil Rights Acts of 1957, the Civil Rights Acts of 1960, the Civil Rights Acts of 1964, and the Civil Rights Acts of 1968 as well as the 24th Amendment to the U.S. Constitution and the Voting Rights Act of 1965. He was a delegate to the 1964 Democratic National Convention, and chairman of the state Democratic party from 1964-1970.

Abbitt announced his retirement to avoid being redistricted into the same congressional district as fellow Democrat Dan Daniel, who was then reelected. Republican Robert Daniel won the eastern part of the old district in a 5-candidate general election field, becoming the first Republican to represent Southside Virginia in the century.

=== Endorsement of Douglas Wilder ===
Having long since recanted his segregationist views, Abbitt endorsed L. Douglas Wilder, who became Virginia's first black governor in 1989. According to his son, state delegate Watkins Abbitt Jr., he and his sisters played a role in his father's change of heart. Watkins Jr. noted that in his later years, his father always worked for free for any black church that needed legal services, and a black minister spoke at the funeral.

== Death and legacy ==
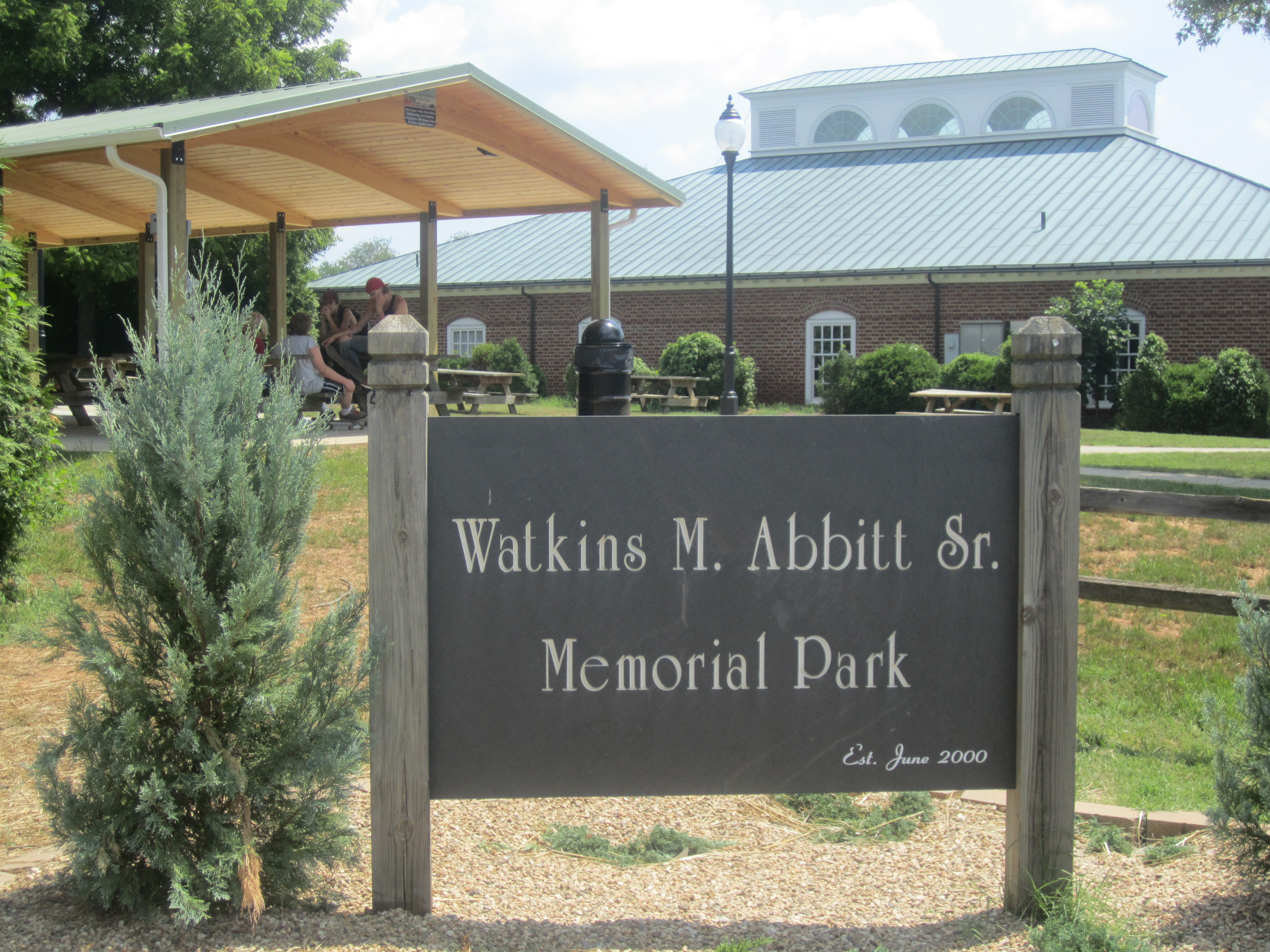
Watkins M. Abbitt Sr. Memorial Park in Appomattox, Virginia

Abbitt was married twice. His first wife of 52 years, Corinne, died in 1989 and Abbitt later married Mary Ann Schmidt who survived him when he died from leukemia in Lynchburg, Virginia on July 13, 1998. He maintained an active law practice as late as a week before his death. A park in Appomattox, Virginia is named for him.

His son, Watkins Abbitt Jr., served as a member of the Virginia House of Delegates from 1986 to 2012.

== Elections ==
- 1948; Abbitt was elected to the U.S. House of Representatives in a special election with 49.0% of the vote against three opponents Substantiated claim from web site. and was re-elected in the general election unopposed.
- 1950; Abbitt was re-elected unopposed.
- 1952; Abbitt was re-elected unopposed.
- 1954; Abbitt was re-elected unopposed.
- 1956; Abbitt was re-elected unopposed.
- 1958; Abbitt was re-elected with 87.15% of the vote, defeating Independent Frank M. McCann.
- 1960; Abbitt was re-elected unopposed.
- 1962; Abbitt was re-elected unopposed.
- 1964; Abbitt was re-elected with 69.4% of the vote against Independent Samuel W. Tucker in the general election.
- 1966; Abbitt was re-elected with 66.4% of the vote, defeating Independent Edward J. Silverman and 7907 write-ins.
- 1968; Abbitt was re-elected with 71.52% of the vote, defeating Independent Samuel W. Tucker.
- 1970; Abbitt was re-elected with 61.02% of the vote, defeating Independent Ben Ragsdale and Republican James M. Helms.

U.S. House of Representatives
| Preceded by Patrick H. Drewry | Member of the U.S. House of Representatives from Virginia's 4th congressional district 1948–1973 | Succeeded by Robert Daniel |
