= Chris Runion =

Virginia politician

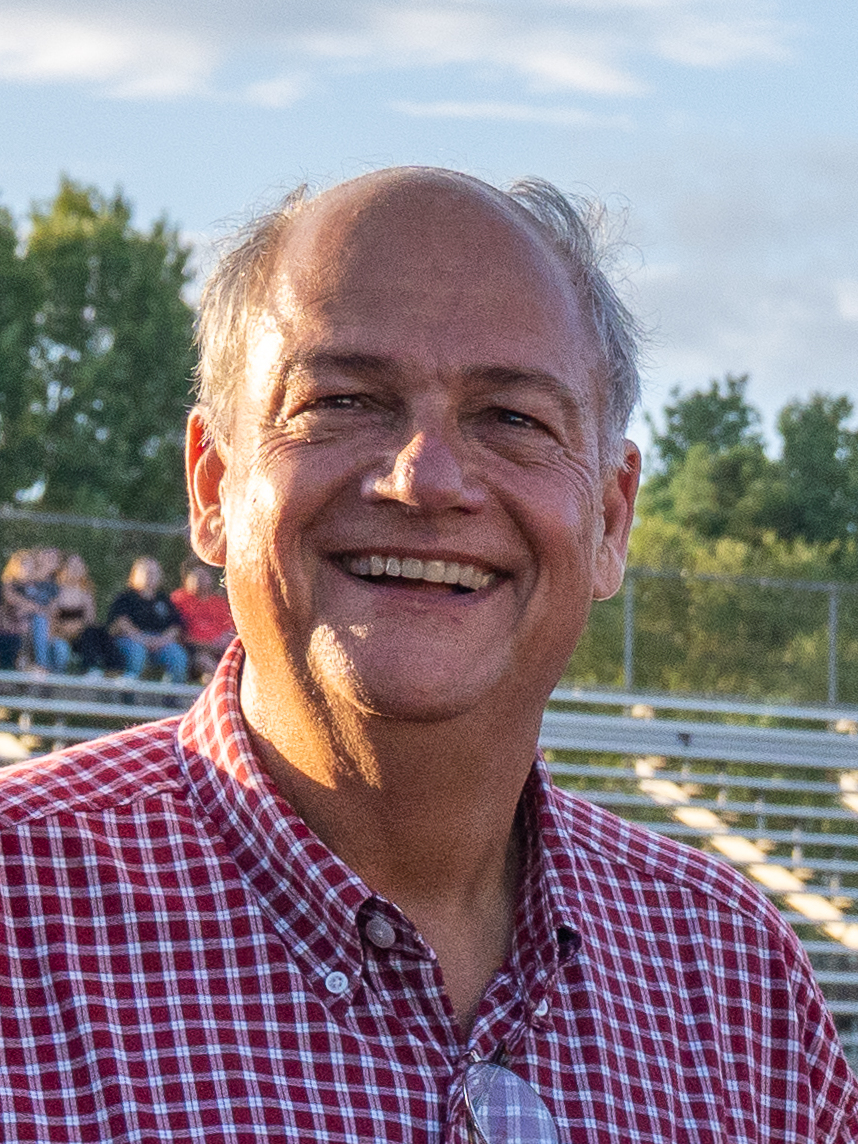
- Runion in 2025

Member of the Virginia House of Delegates
- Incumbent
- Assumed office January 8, 2020
- Preceded by: Steve Landes
- Constituency: 25th district (2020–2024); 35th district (2024–present)

Personal details
- Born: 1958 (age 67–68)
- Party: Republican
- Spouse: Jennifer Runion
- Website: https://www.chrisrunion.com/

Christopher Scott Runion is an American politician. A Republican, he is a member of the Virginia House of Delegates, representing the 35th district.

== Biography ==
Runion grew up on a farm in the Shenandoah Valley. After graduating with an accounting degree from Virginia Tech, he married and moved to Bridgewater. Runion then earned an MBA from James Madison University.

Runion has served on various councils around the region and has worked for several local Republican political campaigns.

== Political career ==
=== 2019 ===
Runion launched his campaign for the 25th district in the 2019 election after incumbent Republican Steve Landes announced he would not run for reelection, instead running for the Clerk of Court for Augusta County.

After winning the Republican primary, Runion faced Democrat Jennifer Kitchen in the general election. Runion was elected with 58.1% of the vote.
