= Steve Shannon =

American politician

Stephen C. Shannon
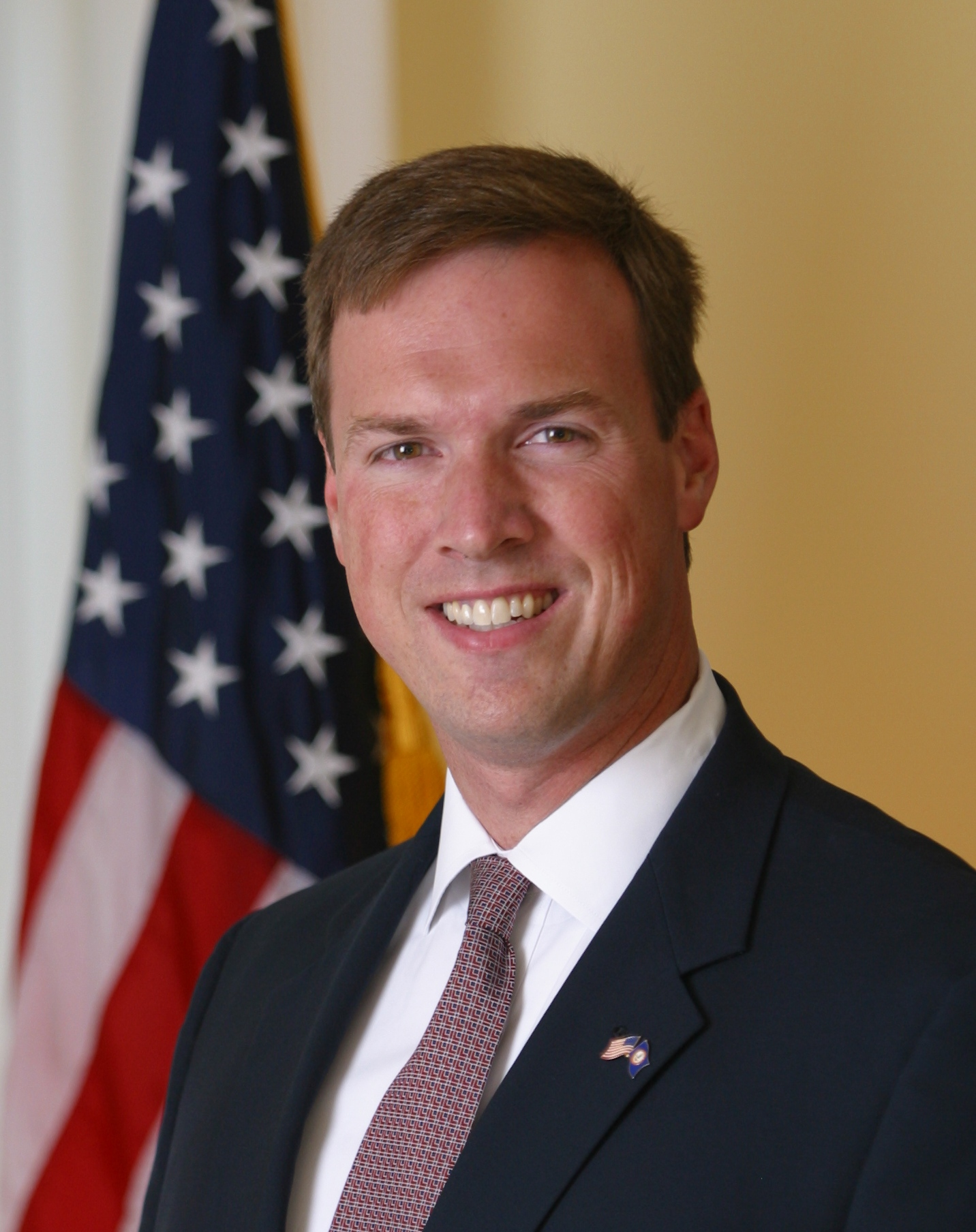

Member of the Virginia House of Delegates from the 35th district
- In office January 3, 2004 – January 13, 2009
- Preceded by: Jeannemarie Devolites Davis
- Succeeded by: Mark Keam

Personal details
- Born: Stephen Charles Shannon; April 5, 1971 (age 55) Berkeley, California, U.S.
- Party: Democratic
- Spouse: Abigail Suzanne Hochberg
- Education: Fairfield University (B.A.); Georgetown University (M.P.P.); University of Virginia (J.D.)
- Profession: Lawyer

Stephen Charles "Steve" Shannon (born April 5, 1971) is former Democratic politician and American attorney who now serves as the Chief Judge of the Fairfax County Circuit Court in the 19th Judicial Circuit of Virginia.

From 2004 to 2009, Shannon represented Virginia's 35th District in the Virginia House of Delegates as a Democrat. He was the 2009 Democratic nominee for Attorney General of Virginia. He was defeated by his opponent, Republican Ken Cuccinelli.

== Early life ==
Shannon graduated from Fenwick High School in 1989, received a Bachelor of Arts degree from Fairfield University in 1993, a Master of Public Policy degree from Georgetown University in 1996, and a Juris Doctor degree from the University of Virginia School of Law in 1999 where he was a John M. Olin Fellow and Scholar in Law and Economics and a member of the Virginia Law Review.

In 2001, Shannon and his wife Abby co-founded the Metropolitan Washington AMBER (America's Missing: Broadcast Emergency Response) Plan, a local extension of the nationwide child recovery program. Shannon's plan for a regional AMBER system successfully coordinated local law enforcement, media, and community groups to create a rapid-response child recovery network. In recognition of this, the Shannons received Fairfax County's highest public service award.

Shannon served as Assistant Commonwealth's Attorney for Fairfax County where he worked with the state's chief felony prosecutor. Shannon devoted much of his time to consumer protection and child safety issues, frequently prosecuting criminals charged with assault, child molestation, rape and domestic violence. Additionally, Shannon prosecuted one of the state's largest embezzlement cases in an effort to combat institutional corruption.

From 2002 to 2003 Shannon served as Vice-Chairman of the Fairfax County Consumer Protection Commission, where he was responsible for protecting citizens from illegal, fraudulent or deceptive consumer practices.

== Legislative career ==
In 2003 Shannon was elected to represent the 35th District in Virginia's House of Delegates. He was re-elected in 2005 and 2007 (winning with 60% and 63%, respectively). He was succeeded in the house by fellow Democrat Mark L. Keam.

Shannon introduced several public safety bills in the Virginia House of Delegates. These included stronger witness protections in cases of violent crime, increased penalties for gang-related violence, Reform of Emergency Response Plans in the wake of the Virginia Tech tragedy, and expansion of Virginia's Rape Shield Statute, and making it a crime to evade sex offender registration

Shannon introduced legislation intended to protect Virginians against identity theft – specifically requiring database managers to implement security measures to guard against unauthorized access to customer information.

In January 2009, Shannon responded to the economic crisis by introducing a bill with the intention of increasing government accountability, improving budget oversight, and reducing wasteful bureaucratic spending. Shannon's House Resolution was intended to repair the state's budget shortfalls, strongly recommending that the House of Delegates implement cost-saving measures which he deemed necessary.

== 2009 Virginia Attorney General Election ==
Shannon ran as a Democrat for Virginia Attorney General in 2009. His platform included increased restrictions on sex offenders use of Social Networking services and several measures to deter drunk driving, and attempting to curb gang recruitment. He defeated attorney John P. Fishwick, Jr. in the Democratic primary. In the general election, his candidacy was endorsed by The Washington Post and The Virginian-Pilot. He was defeated by Republican candidate Ken Cuccinelli on November 3, 2009.

== Electoral history ==
Date	Election	Candidate	Party	Votes	%
Virginia House of Delegates, 35th district
Nov 4, 2003	General	S C Shannon	Democratic	9,151	51.90
Nov 4, 2003	General	R M Mcdowell	Republican	8,478	48.08
Nov 4, 2003	General	Write Ins		4	0.02
Nov 4, 2003	General	Jeannemarie Devolites Davis was elected to the Senate; seat switched from Republican to Democratic			
Nov 8, 2005	General	S C Shannon	Democratic	14,626	60.43
Nov 8, 2005	General	J E Hyland	Republican	9,568	39.53
Nov 8, 2005	General	Write Ins		11	0.05
Nov 6, 2007	General	Stephen C. Shannon	Democratic	11,956	63.35
Nov 6, 2007	General	Arthur G. Purves	Republican	6,900	36.56
Nov 6, 2007	General	Write Ins		15	0.07
Attorney General of Virginia
Nov 3, 2009	General	Ken T. Cuccinelli II	Republican	1,124,137	57.51
Nov 3, 2009	General	Stephen C. Shannon	Democratic	828,687	42.39
Nov 3, 2009	General	Write Ins		1,772	0.09
Nov 3, 2009	General	Bob McDonnell resigned to run for Governor; office stayed Republican			

== Post-political career ==
After his defeat, Shannon worked at the law firm of Odin, Feldman & Pittleman, PC. On February 25, 2015, he was elected a judge of the Fairfax County Circuit Court. He has also taught as an adjunct professor at George Mason University's Antonin Scalia Law School. In 2026, he was selected as the Chief Judge.

== See also ==
- Virginia elections, 2009
