= Virginia's 59th House of Delegates district =

Virginia legislative district

District map from the 2023 election

Virginia's 59th House of Delegates district elects one of 100 seats in the Virginia House of Delegates, the lower house of the state's bicameral legislature. District 59 represents part of Appomattox and Buckingham counties, as well as parts of Albemarle, Campbell, and Nelson counties. The seat is currently held by Republican C. Matthew Fariss.

== Elections ==
=== 2017 ===
In the November 2017 election, Fariss was part of a four-way race, running against Democrat Tracy Carver, who is a mechanic based in Albemarle; Green Party Marcus Sutphin, who is a business owner in Concord; and independent David Ball from Buckingham County. It is the first time Fariss's seat has been challenged since 2011. As of late July 2017, Fariss led in fundraising for the race, with largest donations from private donors as well as the Southside Electric Cooperative, Altria (Phillip Morris USA's parent company) and Golden Leaf Farms.

Farriss won the 2017 general election with 61% of the vote.
