= 2009 Virginia elections =

- November 3, 2009

The following offices were up for election in the United States Commonwealth of Virginia in the November 2009 general election:

- Three statewide offices – Governor, Lieutenant Governor, Attorney General – for four-year terms
- Virginia House of Delegates, the lower house of the Virginia General Assembly (100 seats), for two-year terms
- Four local constitutional officers each in the larger independent cities – Sheriff, Commonwealth's Attorney, Treasurer, Commissioner of the Revenue – for four-year terms

These elections will determine how the General Assembly will redraw district boundaries for seats in the United States House of Representatives, the Senate of Virginia, and the House of Delegates, based on results of the 2010 United States Census in 2011.

== Schedule of election-related events ==
The Virginia State Board of Elections set the following calendar of events for the November 2009 election:

- March 11 – Deadline for political party officials to request primary elections from the State Board of Elections
- April 10 – Filing deadline for primary election candidates
- May 11 – Voter registration deadline for primary election
- June 2 – Application deadline for primary election mail-in absentee ballot
- June 6 – Application deadline for primary election in-person absentee ballot
- June 9 – Primary elections; deadline for parties to select candidates by non-primary methods; filing deadline for independent candidates
- October 5 – Voter registration deadline for general election
- October 27 – Application deadline for general election mail-in absentee ballot
- October 31 – Application deadline for general election in-person absentee ballot
- November 3 – General election

In addition, candidates must file campaign finance reports with the state or local election boards at certain specified intervals during the campaign year. The three incumbent statewide officeholders and members of the General Assembly are barred by law from fundraising during the annual session of the General Assembly, from mid-January through roughly the end of February.

Sufficiently large political parties (in practice, the Democratic and Republican parties) have the option of nominating candidates in primary elections. Nominees not chosen in primaries are selected in a caucus or convention process. Incumbent members of Congress and the General Assembly have the option of choosing their party's nominating method for their office; otherwise, the decision is made by a committee of party officials from the jurisdiction involved. Persons 18 years old or older on the general election date (born on or before November 3, 1991) may register and vote in both the primary and general elections. Voters in Virginia do not register by party; they have the option of voting in any one party's primary, and may switch at will from one election to the next.

== Governor ==
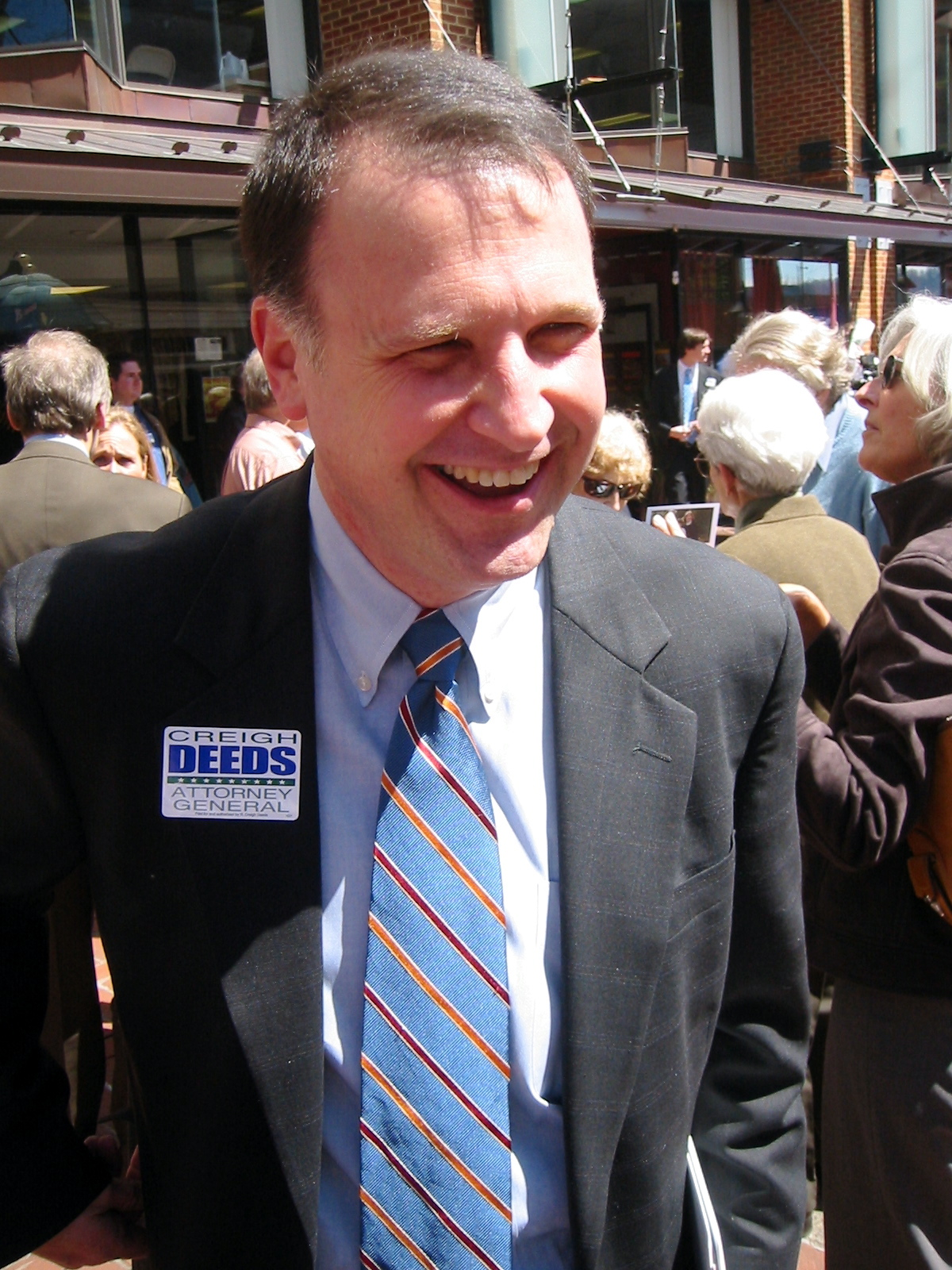
Creigh Deeds (D)

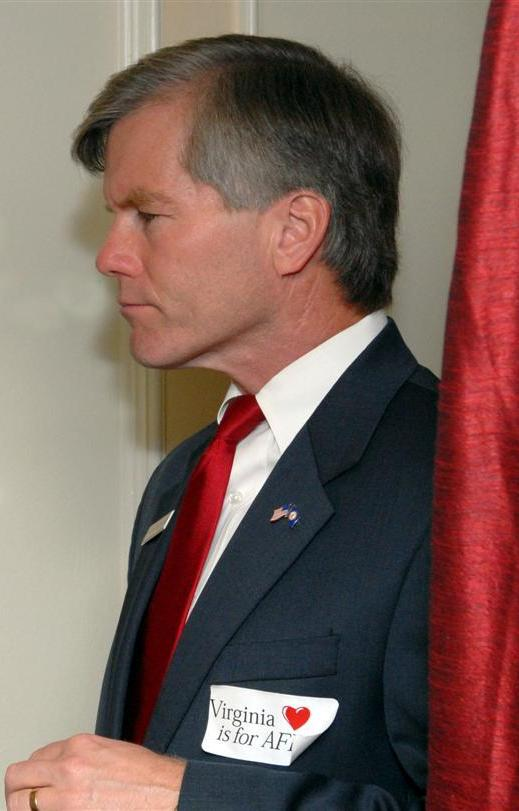
Bob McDonnell (R)

Party nominees:

- The Republican Party formally nominated former Attorney General Bob McDonnell of Virginia Beach, who was unopposed for the nomination, at the May 29–30 state party convention. McDonnell resigned as Virginia's Attorney General on February 3, 2009, to concentrate on the gubernatorial campaign.
- The Democratic Party nominated Creigh Deeds, Democrat from Bath County – senator since 2002 following 10 years in the House; unsuccessful Democratic nominee for attorney general in 2005, after he captured the nomination in the Democratic Primary on June 9, 2009

Former candidates for the Democratic Party nomination:

- Terry McAuliffe, Democrat from Fairfax County – political consultant, former Democratic National Committee chair, recently Presidential campaign manager for Hillary Clinton; created a campaign committee on November 11, 2008
- Brian Moran, Democrat from Alexandria – 7 term House member and House Democratic caucus chair; younger brother of U.S. Representative Jim Moran. Resigned from House of Delegates December 12, 2008 to concentrate on campaign

== Lieutenant governor ==
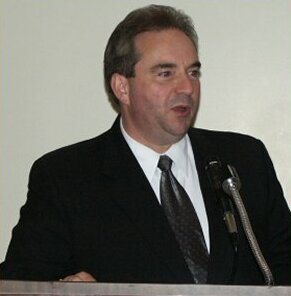
Bill Bolling (R)

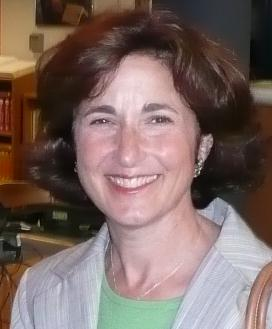
Jody Wagner (D)

Party nominees:

- Former state Secretary of Finance Jody Wagner, who resigned her position on August 8, 2008, to run, won the June 9 primary to be the Democratic Party nominee. Previously she was the unsuccessful Democratic candidate in Virginia's 2nd congressional district in 2000.
- The Republican Party nominated incumbent Lt. Governor and former State Senator Bill Bolling of Hanover County at the party's May 29–30 convention.

Former candidates:

- Jon Bowerbank, a Democratic energy industry engineer/entrepreneur, won election to the Russell County Board of Supervisors in November 2007 and began campaigning for lieutenant governor in May 2008. After getting his name on the primary ballot, Bowerbank withdrew on May 15, 2009, endorsing Wagner.
- Pat Edmonson, a Virginia Beach School Board member, announced her candidacy for the Democratic nomination on January 12, 2009, saying voters were "ready for a progressive voice" She failed to file the proper candidate paperwork with the state by the April 10, 2009 deadline, making her ineligible for the primary,
- Patrick C. Muldoon of Giles County, an unsuccessful Republican nominee in Virginia's 9th congressional district in 1996, filed on November 11, 2008, but lost the convention vote to Bolling.
- Rich Savage, a Democratic professional campaign consultant from Richmond, announced his candidacy on January 2, 2009 but suspended his campaign on March 6, citing financial pressures caused by the worsening economy.
- Mike Signer of Arlington, a former deputy counselor to Mark Warner on Homeland Security and National Guard policy and senior strategist for Tom Perriello, lost the June 9 Democratic primary to Wagner.

=== Election results ===
==== Democratic primary ====
Official results :

2009 Virginia Lieutenant Governor Democratic primary
Party	Candidate	Votes	%	±%
Democratic	Jody Wagner	213,059	74.29	
Democratic	Mike Signer	60,979	21.26	
Democratic	Jon Bowerbank	12,739	4.44	
Majority		152,080		
Turnout		286,777	5.65	

==== General election ====
2009 Virginia Lieutenant Governor general election
Party	Candidate	Votes	%	±%
Republican	Bill Bolling (incumbent)	1,106,674	56.51	+6.04
Democratic	Jody Wagner	850,070	43.40	−5.92
	write-ins	1,580	0.08	−0.13
Majority		256,604		
Turnout		1,958,324	39.51	
Republican hold		Swing		

=== Polling ===
Source	Dates Administered	Jody Wagner (D)	Bill Bolling (R)
Public Policy Polling	November 1, 2009	41%	54%
Survey USA	October 26, 2009	42%	56%
Public Policy Polling	October 19, 2009	39%	49%
Survey USA	October 19, 2009	42%	56%
The Washington Post	October 7, 2009	40%	49%
Survey USA	October 4, 2009	40%	57%
Survey USA	Sept 26–29, 2009	41%	54%
Public Policy Polling	Sept 25–28, 2009	35%	43%
Clarus Research Group	Sept 10–14, 2009	32%	38%
Survey USA	September 3, 2009	42%	52%
Public Policy Polling	Aug 28–31, 2009	40%	46%
Public Policy Polling	July 31-Aug 3, 2009	34%	48%
Survey USA	July 27-July 28, 2009	42%	54%
Public Policy Polling	June 30-July 2, 2009	40%	46%

== Attorney general ==
Ken Cuccinelli (R)

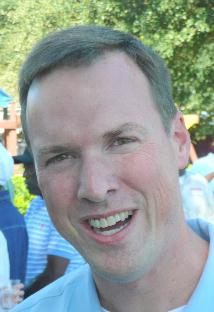
Steve Shannon (D)

Party nominees:

- The Democratic Party nominee is State Delegate and former assistant Commonwealth's Attorney Steve Shannon of Fairfax County. Shannon announced his candidacy in the fall of 2008, and as the only candidate who filed for the Democratic primary, became the Democratic nominee by default.
- The Republican Party nominee is State Senator Ken Cuccinelli of Fairfax County; Cuccinelli announced April 1, 2008, and won the nomination at the May 29–30 Republican convention.
- Both candidates, Cuccinelli (Class of 1986) and Shannon (Class of 1989), attended Gonzaga College High School in Washington, D.C.

Former candidates:

- John L. Brownlee of Roanoke is a former United States Attorney for the Western District of Virginia who resigned on May 16, 2008, to run for the Republican Party nomination, but lost the convention vote to Cuccinelli.
- John Fishwick, an attorney from Roanoke and unsuccessful 1992 Democratic candidate for the United States House of Representatives, set up a committee to run for the Democratic nomination in October 2008 but withdrew on January 5, 2009.
- David M. Foster of Arlington, an antitrust lawyer with Fulbright & Jaworski in Washington, D.C. and former Arlington County school board chair ran for the Republican nomination but lost the convention vote to Cuccinelli.

=== General election results ===
2009 Virginia Attorney General election
Party	Candidate	Votes	%	±%
Republican	Ken Cuccinelli	1,124,018	57.51	+7.55
Democratic	Steve Shannon	828,647	42.39	−7.56
	write-ins	1,772	0.09	+0
Majority		295,371		
Turnout		1,954,437	39.43	
Republican hold		Swing		

=== Polling ===
==== General election ====
Source	Dates Administered	Steve Shannon (D)	Ken Cuccinelli (R)
Public Policy Polling	November 1, 2009	39%	55%
Survey USA	October 26, 2009	41%	57%
Public Policy Polling	October 19, 2009	37%	52%
Survey USA	October 19, 2009	41%	56%
The Washington Post	October 7, 2009	40%	49%
Survey USA	October 4, 2009	43%	53%
Survey USA	Sept 26–29, 2009	42%	53%
Public Policy Polling	Sept 25–28, 2009	34%	43%
Clarus Research Group	Sept 10–14, 2009	30%	35%
Survey USA	September 3, 2009	41%	54%
Public Policy Polling	Aug 28–31, 2009	35%	48%
Public Policy Polling	July 31-Aug 3, 2009	32%	45%
Survey USA	July 27-July 28, 2009	42%	53%
Public Policy Polling	June 30-July 2, 2009	38%	45%

== House of Delegates ==
The 2009 Elections to the Virginia House of Delegates were held on November 3, 2009. Prior to the election, Republicans held 53 seats, Democrats held 43 seats, and Independents held 2 seats (both of whom caucus with the Republicans).

There were 2 seats previously held by Democrats that were vacant on election day: the 69th (Frank Hall resigned April 14, 2009) and the 80th (Ken Melvin resigned May 1, 2009). Eight incumbent Democrats were defeated, one incumbent Republican was defeated, and one open Republican seat was won by a Democrat. The composition of the House of Delegates in 2010 was 59 Republicans, 2 Independents who caucus with the Republicans, and 39 Democrats.
