= 2021 Virginia Attorney General election =

- November 2, 2021
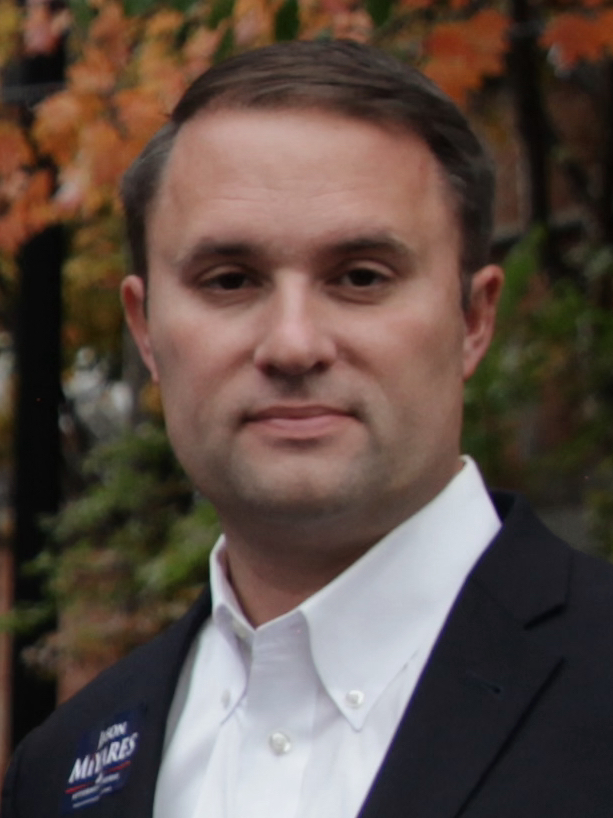

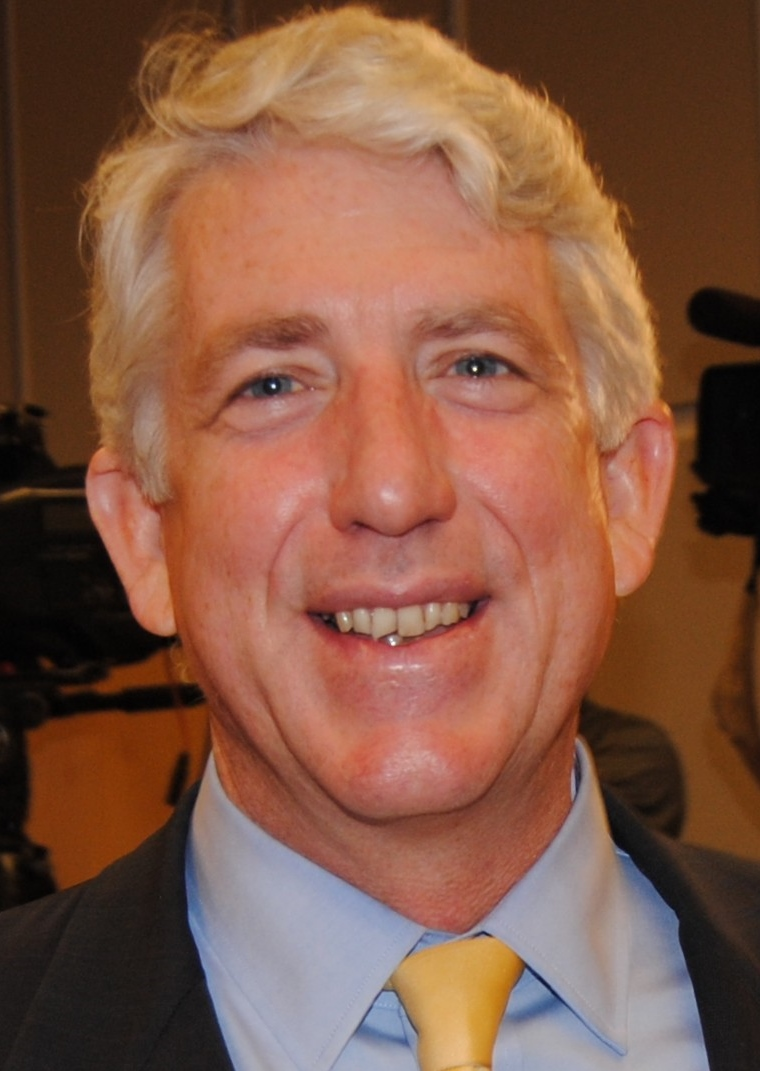
Nominee	Jason Miyares	Mark Herring
Party	Republican	Democratic
Popular vote	1,647,534	1,621,227
Percentage	50.36%	49.55%
- Miyares: 40–50% 50–60% 60–70% 70–80% 80–90% >90% Herring: 50–60% 60–70% 70–80% 80–90% >90% Tie: 40–50% 50% No data
Attorney General before election
Mark Herring
Democratic
Elected Attorney General
Jason Miyares
Republican

The 2021 Virginia Attorney General election was held on November 2, 2021, to elect the attorney general of Virginia. Republican state delegate Jason Miyares defeated Democratic incumbent Mark Herring. Herring conceded defeat at 5:02 PM EST the following day, November 3.

Miyares became the first Cuban-American and Hispanic to be elected to statewide office in Virginia. Miyares was sworn into office on January 15, 2022.

== Democratic primary ==
=== Candidates ===
==== Nominee ====
- Mark Herring, incumbent attorney general (2014–2022)

==== Eliminated in primary ====
- Jay Jones, state delegate from HD-89 (2018–2022)

==== Declined ====
- Shannon Taylor, Henrico County commonwealth's attorney (2012–present) (endorsed Herring)

==== Endorsements ====
Mark Herring

U.S. representatives

- Don Beyer, VA-08 (2015–present)
- Gerry Connolly, VA-11 (2009–2025)

State legislators

- Eileen Filler-Corn, speaker of the House of Delegates (2020–2022) from HD-41 (2010–2024)
- Charniele Herring, House majority leader from HD-04 (2009–present)
- Louise Lucas, president pro tempore from SD-18 (1992–present)
- 2 other state senators (Note: Jennifer Boysko, SD-33 (2019–present); Ghazala Hashmi, SD-10 (2020–2026))
- 12 other state delegates (Note: Dawn Adams, HD-68 (2018–2024); David Bulova, HD-37 (2006–2026); Betsy Carr, HD-69 (2010–present); Karrie Delaney, HD-67 (2018–present); Wendy Gooditis, HD-10 (2018–2024); Alfonso H. Lopez, HD-49 (2012–present); Delores McQuinn, HD-70 (2009–present); Ken Plum, HD-36 (1982–present); Rip Sullivan, HD-48 (2014–present); Mark Sickles, HD-43 (2004–2026); Vivian Watts, HD-39 (1996–present); Rodney Willett, HD-73 (2020–present))

Local officials

- Phyllis Randall, chair of the Loudoun County Board of Supervisors (2016–present)
- Shannon Taylor, commonwealth's attorney for Henrico County (2012–present)

Organizations

- Moms Demand Action (co-endorsement with Jones)
Jay Jones

U.S. senators

- Cory Booker, New Jersey (2013–present)

U.S. representatives

- Elaine Luria, VA-02 (2019–2023)
- Bobby Scott, VA-03 (1993–present)

Statewide officials

- Ralph Northam, governor of Virginia (2018–2022)
- Mary Sue Terry, former attorney general of Virginia (1986–1993)

State legislators

- Ward Armstrong, former House minority leader (2007–2011) from HD-10 (2002–2012)
- Dick Cranwell, former House minority leader (2000–2002) from HD-14 (1972–2002)
- David Toscano, former House minority leader (2011–2018) from HD-57 (2006–2020)
- 6 state senators (Note: John Bell, SD-13 (2020–2024); Lynwood Lewis, SD-06 (2014–2024); Mamie Locke, SD-02 (2004–present); Monty Mason, SD-01 (2016–2024); Joe Morrissey, SD-16 (2020–2024); Lionell Spruill, SD-05 (2016–2024))
- 30 other state delegates (Note: Lashrecse Aird, HD-63 (2016–2022); Alex Askew, HD-85 (2020–present); Lamont Bagby, HD-74 (2015–2023); Jeff Bourne, HD-71 (2017–2024); Joshua G. Cole, HD-28 (2020–present); Kelly Fowler, HD-21 (2018–present); Wendy Gooditis, HD-10 (2018–2024); Nancy Guy, HD-83 (2020–2022); Cliff Hayes, HD-77 (2017–present); Steve Heretick, HD-79 (2016–2022); Patrick Hope, HD-47 (2010–present); Chris Hurst, HD-12 (2018–2022); Clint Jenkins, HD-76 (2020–2024); Mark Keam, HD-35 (2010–2022); Kaye Kory, HD-38 (2010–2024); Paul Krizek, HD-44 (2016–present); Martha Mugler, HD-91 (2020–2022); Michael P. Mullin, HD-93 (2016–2023); Kathleen Murphy, HD-34 (2015–2024); Albert C. Pollard, former HD-99 (2000–2016, 2008–2012); Marcia Price, HD-95 (2016–present); David A. Reid, HD-32 (2018–present); Debra Rodman, former HD-73 (2018–2020); Ibraheem Samirah, HD-86 (2019–2022); Don Scott, HD-80 (2020–present); Marcus Simon, HD-53 (2014–present); Shelly Simonds, HD-94 (2020–present); Luke Torian, HD-52 (2010–present); Roslyn Tyler, HD-75 (2006–2022); Schuyler VanValkenburg, HD-72 (2018–2024))

Local officials

- Levar Stoney, mayor of Richmond (2017–2025)

Organizations

- Moms Demand Action (co-endorsement with Herring)

=== Debates ===
Mark Herring and Jay Jones agreed to one debate. The debate started off with Mark Herring talking about his record and saying what he has done about certain cases vs what Jones was doing at the time. Jay Jones started off talking about his endorsement from Governor at the time, Ralph Northam, and claiming Herring's past didn't matter for what was happening in the present.

Herring and Jones agreed on almost every issue asked to them. When the rebuttals came though, Herring would often claim that Jones didn't support something when he was on the legislature and Jones would point to an example where they agreed on it in the past. When Jones rebutted Herring, Jones claimed that Herring didn't begin on the issue until it was in the political atmosphere.

2021 Virginia Democratic Primary for Attorney General
No.	Date	Host	Link	Participants	
Key: P Participant A Absent N Non-invitee W Withdrawn					
Key: P Participant A Absent N Non-invitee W Withdrawn				Jay Jones	Mark Herring*
1	May 15, 2021	WTVR CBS 6		P	P

=== Polling ===
Poll source	Date(s) administered	Sample size (Note: Key: A – all adults RV – registered voters LV – likely voters V – unclear)	Margin of error	Mark Herring	Jay Jones	Other	Undecided
Roanoke College	May 24 – June 1, 2021	637 (LV)	± 3.9%	49%	20%	–	31%
Christopher Newport University	April 11–20, 2021	806 (LV)	± 3.9%	42%	18%	1%	39%

=== Results ===
Results by county and independent city: Herring: 50–60%; 60–70%; 70–80%; 80–90%; Jones: 50–60%; 60–70%

Democratic primary results
Party	Candidate	Votes	%
Democratic	Mark Herring (incumbent)	274,736	56.63%
Democratic	Jay Jones	210,365	43.37%
Total votes		485,101	100.0%

== Republican convention ==
=== Candidates ===
==== Nominee ====
- Jason Miyares, state delegate for HD-82 (2016–2022)

==== Eliminated at convention ====
- Leslie Haley, Chesterfield County supervisor
- Chuck Smith, attorney
- Jack L. White, conservative attorney

==== Declined ====
- Bill Stanley, state senator for SD-20 (2011–present)

=== Results ===
The round-by-round results of the ranked-choice voting election

Virginia GOP Convention, Attorney General Nominee
Candidate	Round 1		Round 2		Round 3	
Candidate	Votes	%	Votes	%	Votes	%
Jason Miyares	4,590	36.6%	5,297	42.2%	6,490	51.7%
Chuck Smith	4,324	34.4%	4,975	39.6%	6,064	48.3%
Jack White	1,872	14.9%	2,282	18.2%	Eliminated	
Leslie Haley	1,768	14.1%	Eliminated			

== General election ==
=== Predictions ===
Source	Ranking	As of
Elections Daily	Lean D	November 1, 2021

=== Post-primary ndorsements ===
Mark Herring (D)

Executive branch officials

- Kamala Harris, vice president of the United States (2021–2025)
- Barack Obama, former president of the United States (2009–2017)

Organizations

- Human Rights Campaign
- Moms Demand Action
Jason Miyares (R)

Executive branch officials

- Ken Cuccinelli, deputy secretary of homeland security (2019–2021)

U.S. senators

- George Allen, former Virginia (2001–2007)
- Marco Rubio, Florida (2011–2025)

U.S. representatives

- Ben Cline, VA-06 (2019–present)

State legislators

- 2 state senators (Note: John Cosgrove, SD-14 (2013–2023); Bill DeSteph, SD-08 (2016–present))
- 5 state delegates (Note: Rob Bell, HD-58 (2002–2023); Mark Cole, HD-88 (2002–2022); Matt Fariss, HD-59 (2012–2024); Terry Kilgore, HD-01 (1994–present); Margaret Ransone, HD-99 (2012–2024))

Organizations

- NRA Political Victory Fund

=== Debates ===
Mark Herring and Jason Miyares agreed to one town hall-style debate.

2021 Virginia Attorney General
No.	Date	Host	Link	Participants	
Key: P Participant A Absent N Non-invitee W Withdrawn					
Key: P Participant A Absent N Non-invitee W Withdrawn				Jason Miyares	Mark Herring*
1	October 13, 2021	Loudoun Chamber		P	P

=== Polling ===
Poll source	Date(s) administered	Sample size	Margin of error	Mark Herring (D)	Jason Miyares (R)	Other	Undecided
The Trafalgar Group (R)	October 29–31, 2021	1,081 (LV)	± 3.0%	47%	50%	1%	2%
Echelon Insights (R)	October 27–29, 2021	611 (LV)	± 4.0%	47%	48%	–	5%
Roanoke College	October 14–28, 2021	571 (LV)	± 4.7%	46%	45%	0%	9%
The Washington Post/Schar School	October 20–26, 2021	1,107 (RV)	± 3.5%	48%	43%	3% (Note: Neither with 2%, Would not vote with 1%, Other with 0%)	6%
The Washington Post/Schar School	October 20–26, 2021	918 (LV)	± 4.0%	50%	44%	1% (Note: Neither with 1%, Other and Would not vote with 0%)	4%
Christopher Newport University	October 17–25, 2021	944 (LV)	± 3.5%	48%	47%	–	5%
Suffolk University	October 21–24, 2021	500 (LV)	± 4.4%	48%	45%	–	7%
Emerson College	October 22–23, 2021	875 (LV)	± 3.2%	47%	44%	1%	7%
co/efficient (R) (Note: Poll sponsored by Winsome Sears's lieutenant gubernatorial campaign)	October 20–21, 2021	785 (LV)	± 3.5%	45%	46%	–	8%
Cygnal (R)	October 19–21, 2021	816 (LV)	± 3.4%	48%	47%	–	6%
Virginia Commonwealth University	October 9–21, 2021	722 (LV)	± 6.4%	39%	35%	14%	12%
Christopher Newport University	September 27 – October 6, 2021	802 (LV)	± 4.2%	49%	43%	–	7%
Emerson College	October 1–3, 2021	620 (LV)	± 3.9%	46%	44%	1%	10%
Roanoke College	September 12–26, 2021	603 (LV)	± 4.6%	47%	37%	0%	16%
KAConsulting LLC (R) (Note: This poll was sponsored by the Presidential Coalition)	September 17–19, 2021	700 (LV)	± 3.7%	43%	27%	1%	30%
Virginia Commonwealth University	September 7–15, 2021	731 (LV)	± 6.9%	39%	33%	14%	14%
Emerson College	September 13–14, 2021	778 (LV)	± 3.4%	47%	41%	2%	11%
University of Mary Washington	September 7–13, 2021	1,000 (A)	± 3.1%	40%	37%	6% (Note: None/Would not vote with 4%, other candidate with 2%)	17%
University of Mary Washington	September 7–13, 2021	528 (LV)	± 4.1%	42%	46%	2% (Note: Other candidate with 2%, None/Would not vote with 0%)	10%
The Trafalgar Group (R)	August 26–29, 2021	1,068 (LV)	± 3.0%	43%	45%	–	13%
Monmouth University	August 24–29, 2021	802 (RV)	± 3.5%	45%	43%	1%	11%
Christopher Newport University	August 15–23, 2021	800 (LV)	± 3.6%	53%	41%	0%	6%
Roanoke College	August 3–17, 2021	558 (LV)	± 4.2%	45%	37%	1%	17%
Virginia Commonwealth University	August 4–15, 2021	770 (RV)	± 5.4%	40%	30%	20%	10%
Virginia Commonwealth University	August 4–15, 2021	~747 (LV)	± 5.5%	41%	30%	19%	10%
JMC Analytics and Polling (R)	June 9–12, 2021	550 (LV)	± 4.2%	45%	38%	–	17%

== Results ==
2021 Virginia Attorney General election
Party	Candidate	Votes	%	±%
Republican	Jason Miyares	1,647,534	50.36%	+3.80%
Democratic	Mark Herring (incumbent)	1,621,227	49.55%	−3.78%
Write-in		2,996	0.09%	–0.01%
Total votes		3,271,757	100.00%	N/A
Republican gain from Democratic				

=== By county and independent city ===
Hopewell and Surry County voted for different parties for governor and Attorney General, as it voted for Republican Glenn Youngkin for the former and Democrat Mark Herring for the latter.

Locality	Mark Herring Democratic		Jason Miyares Republican		Write-in Various		Margin		Total votes cast
Locality	#	%	#	%	#	%	#	%	Total votes cast
Accomack	5,034	39.25%	7,784	60.69%	7	0.05%	2,750	21.44%	12,825
Albemarle	32,282	63.13%	18,809	36.78%	42	0.08%	−13,473	−26.35%	51,133
Alexandria	44,070	76.30%	13,632	23.60%	59	0.10%	−30,438	−52.70%	57,761
Alleghany	1,599	26.46%	4,441	73.49%	3	0.05%	2,842	47.03%	6,043
Amelia	1,652	26.08%	4,681	73.89%	2	0.03%	3,029	47.81%	6,335
Amherst	4,015	29.46%	9,607	70.49%	7	0.05%	5,592	41.03%	13,629
Appomattox	1,510	20.38%	5,892	79.54%	6	0.08%	4,382	59.15%	7,408
Arlington	73,149	77.42%	21,223	22.46%	114	0.12%	−51,926	−54.96%	94,486
Augusta	7,632	22.79%	25,840	77.16%	19	0.06%	18,208	54.37%	33,491
Bath	432	22.29%	1,505	77.66%	1	0.05%	1,073	55.37%	1,938
Bedford	8,199	21.07%	30,692	78.86%	28	0.07%	22,493	57.79%	38,919
Bland	378	14.36%	2,252	85.53%	3	0.11%	1,874	71.17%	2,633
Botetourt	4,092	23.96%	12,967	75.94%	16	0.09%	8,875	51.98%	17,075
Bristol	1,338	26.34%	3,739	73.62%	2	0.04%	2,401	47.27%	5,079
Brunswick	3,216	53.01%	2,847	46.93%	4	0.07%	−369	−6.08%	6,067
Buchanan	960	16.21%	4,954	83.67%	7	0.12%	3,994	67.45%	5,921
Buckingham	2,258	36.88%	3,859	63.03%	5	0.08%	1,601	26.15%	6,122
Buena Vista	520	26.83%	1,416	73.07%	2	0.10%	896	46.23%	1,938
Campbell	5,084	21.96%	18,059	77.99%	13	0.06%	12,975	56.03%	23,156
Caroline	5,129	42.67%	6,883	57.27%	7	0.06%	1,754	14.59%	12,019
Carroll	1,979	16.81%	9,786	83.13%	7	0.06%	7,807	66.32%	11,772
Charles City	1,823	54.05%	1,549	45.92%	1	0.03%	−274	−8.12%	3,373
Charlotte	1,457	30.67%	3,290	69.26%	3	0.06%	1,833	38.59%	4,750
Charlottesville	14,471	84.33%	2,673	15.58%	15	0.09%	−11,798	−68.76%	17,159
Chesapeake	43,598	47.64%	47,836	52.27%	78	0.09%	4,238	4.63%	91,512
Chesterfield	74,719	47.94%	80,993	51.96%	153	0.10%	6,274	4.03%	155,865
Clarke	2,838	38.44%	4,538	61.47%	6	0.08%	1,700	23.03%	7,382
Colonial Heights	1,763	26.46%	4,892	73.43%	7	0.11%	3,129	46.97%	6,662
Covington	619	34.74%	1,162	65.21%	1	0.06%	543	30.47%	1,782
Craig	430	17.28%	2,052	82.48%	6	0.24%	1,622	65.19%	2,488
Culpeper	6,892	34.24%	13,222	65.69%	13	0.06%	6,330	31.45%	20,127
Cumberland	1,543	36.70%	2,660	63.27%	1	0.02%	1,117	26.57%	4,204
Danville	6,923	54.37%	5,801	45.56%	8	0.06%	−1,122	−8.81%	12,732
Dickenson	961	20.10%	3,819	79.86%	2	0.04%	2,858	59.77%	4,782
Dinwiddie	4,223	36.63%	7,302	63.33%	5	0.04%	3,079	26.70%	11,530
Emporia	897	55.85%	708	44.08%	1	0.06%	−189	−11.77%	1,606
Essex	2,038	43.43%	2,654	56.55%	1	0.02%	616	13.13%	4,693
Fairfax City	6,501	64.56%	3,560	35.36%	8	0.08%	−2,941	−29.21%	10,069
Fairfax County	287,726	65.74%	149,398	34.14%	524	0.12%	−138,328	−31.61%	437,648
Falls Church	5,403	77.73%	1,542	22.18%	6	0.09%	−3,861	−55.55%	6,951
Fauquier	11,861	35.00%	22,012	64.95%	18	0.05%	10,151	29.95%	33,891
Floyd	2,259	30.25%	5,199	69.63%	9	0.12%	2,940	39.37%	7,467
Fluvanna	5,436	43.86%	6,951	56.09%	6	0.05%	1,515	12.22%	12,393
Franklin City	1,701	57.82%	1,240	42.15%	1	0.03%	−461	−15.67%	2,942
Franklin County	6,115	25.78%	17,593	74.17%	13	0.05%	11,478	48.39%	23,721
Frederick	11,525	31.80%	24,701	68.15%	17	0.05%	13,176	36.35%	36,243
Fredericksburg	5,527	61.61%	3,435	38.29%	9	0.10%	−2,092	−23.32%	8,971
Galax	514	27.02%	1,386	72.87%	2	0.11%	872	45.85%	1,902
Giles	1,635	22.30%	5,693	77.66%	3	0.04%	4,058	55.35%	7,331
Gloucester	4,845	28.00%	12,445	71.93%	11	0.06%	7,600	43.93%	17,301
Goochland	4,906	33.81%	9,591	66.10%	12	0.08%	4,685	32.29%	14,509
Grayson	1,116	18.01%	5,075	81.89%	6	0.10%	3,959	63.89%	6,197
Greene	2,935	33.40%	5,848	66.55%	5	0.06%	2,913	33.15%	8,788
Greensville	1,929	53.45%	1,679	46.52%	1	0.03%	−250	−6.93%	3,609
Halifax	4,831	35.93%	8,606	64.00%	9	0.07%	3,775	28.08%	13,446
Hampton	30,236	67.38%	14,596	32.53%	44	0.10%	−15,640	−34.85%	44,876
Hanover	18,920	32.12%	39,931	67.80%	44	0.07%	21,011	35.68%	58,895
Harrisonburg	6,942	61.70%	4,296	38.18%	14	0.12%	−2,646	−23.52%	11,252
Henrico	82,377	59.55%	55,821	40.35%	138	0.10%	−26,556	−19.20%	138,336
Henry	5,718	31.07%	12,675	68.87%	11	0.06%	6,957	37.80%	18,404
Highland	348	26.91%	945	73.09%	0	0.00%	597	46.17%	1,293
Hopewell	3,159	50.47%	3,085	49.29%	15	0.24%	−74	−1.18%	6,259
Isle of Wight	6,664	35.86%	11,900	64.03%	20	0.11%	5,236	28.17%	18,584
James City	18,824	47.13%	21,090	52.80%	29	0.07%	2,266	5.67%	39,943
King and Queen	1,148	35.34%	2,098	64.59%	2	0.06%	950	29.25%	3,248
King George	3,458	32.47%	7,185	67.46%	8	0.08%	3,727	34.99%	10,651
King William	2,293	26.85%	6,241	73.07%	7	0.08%	3,948	46.22%	8,541
Lancaster	2,400	41.05%	3,444	58.91%	2	0.03%	1,044	17.86%	5,846
Lee	918	12.68%	6,316	87.25%	5	0.07%	5,398	74.57%	7,239
Lexington	1,317	63.68%	749	36.22%	2	0.10%	−568	−27.47%	2,068
Loudoun	90,689	56.26%	70,348	43.64%	156	0.10%	−20,341	−12.62%	161,193
Louisa	5,950	33.88%	11,606	66.08%	8	0.05%	5,656	32.20%	17,564
Lunenburg	1,596	34.83%	2,985	65.15%	1	0.02%	1,389	30.31%	4,582
Lynchburg	11,145	45.11%	13,545	54.82%	16	0.06%	2,400	9.71%	24,706
Madison	2,060	30.86%	4,611	69.08%	4	0.06%	2,551	38.22%	6,675
Manassas	6,242	55.54%	4,978	44.30%	18	0.16%	−1,264	−11.25%	11,238
Manassas Park	2,194	61.32%	1,372	38.35%	12	0.34%	−822	−22.97%	3,578
Martinsville	2,263	57.82%	1,645	42.03%	6	0.15%	−618	−15.79%	3,914
Mathews	1,403	28.90%	3,446	70.98%	6	0.12%	2,043	42.08%	4,855
Mecklenburg	4,139	34.57%	7,828	65.38%	6	0.05%	3,689	30.81%	11,973
Middlesex	1,866	33.42%	3,714	66.52%	3	0.05%	1,848	33.10%	5,583
Montgomery	15,704	48.22%	16,828	51.67%	38	0.12%	1,124	3.45%	32,570
Nelson	3,466	45.34%	4,174	54.60%	4	0.05%	708	9.26%	7,644
New Kent	3,479	28.88%	8,563	71.08%	5	0.04%	5,084	42.20%	12,047
Newport News	32,725	60.69%	21,135	39.20%	61	0.11%	−11,590	−21.49%	53,921
Norfolk	40,914	68.45%	18,770	31.40%	87	0.15%	−22,144	−37.05%	59,771
Northampton	2,588	49.62%	2,625	50.33%	3	0.06%	37	0.71%	5,216
Northumberland	2,336	36.03%	4,145	63.93%	3	0.05%	1,809	27.90%	6,484
Norton	344	28.96%	842	70.88%	2	0.17%	498	41.92%	1,188
Nottoway	1,947	36.08%	3,444	63.81%	6	0.11%	1,497	27.74%	5,397
Orange	5,533	34.51%	10,493	65.44%	9	0.06%	4,960	30.93%	16,035
Page	2,107	22.09%	7,425	77.83%	8	0.08%	5,318	55.74%	9,540
Patrick	1,331	18.51%	5,855	81.44%	3	0.04%	4,524	62.93%	7,189
Petersburg	7,625	86.24%	1,207	13.65%	10	0.11%	−6,418	−72.59%	8,842
Pittsylvania	6,476	25.03%	19,391	74.93%	11	0.04%	12,915	49.91%	25,878
Poquoson	1,396	22.26%	4,870	77.65%	6	0.10%	3,474	55.39%	6,272
Portsmouth	19,783	66.77%	9,809	33.11%	37	0.12%	−9,974	−33.66%	29,629
Powhatan	3,774	23.10%	12,556	76.84%	10	0.06%	8,782	53.75%	16,340
Prince Edward	3,213	45.40%	3,855	54.47%	9	0.13%	642	9.07%	7,077
Prince George	4,646	35.26%	8,526	64.70%	5	0.04%	3,880	29.45%	13,177
Prince William	88,374	57.89%	64,148	42.02%	136	0.09%	−24,226	−15.87%	152,658
Pulaski	3,393	26.19%	9,555	73.75%	8	0.06%	6,162	47.56%	12,956
Radford	1,931	46.40%	2,226	53.48%	5	0.12%	295	7.09%	4,162
Rappahannock	1,725	41.21%	2,456	58.67%	5	0.12%	731	17.46%	4,186
Richmond City	63,724	80.05%	15,723	19.75%	159	0.20%	−48,001	−60.30%	79,606
Richmond County	977	30.74%	2,201	69.26%	0	0.00%	1,224	38.51%	3,178
Roanoke City	17,078	59.05%	11,814	40.85%	31	0.11%	−5,264	−18.20%	28,923
Roanoke County	14,670	34.38%	27,968	65.54%	33	0.08%	13,298	31.16%	42,671
Rockbridge	3,172	31.76%	6,810	68.20%	4	0.04%	3,638	36.43%	9,986
Rockingham	8,971	25.42%	26,287	74.49%	29	0.08%	17,316	49.07%	35,287
Russell	1,491	15.51%	8,118	84.42%	7	0.07%	6,627	68.92%	9,616
Salem	3,395	35.71%	6,100	64.17%	11	0.12%	2,705	28.46%	9,506
Scott	1,072	13.29%	6,986	86.62%	7	0.09%	5,914	73.33%	8,065
Shenandoah	4,750	26.05%	13,475	73.89%	11	0.06%	8,725	47.84%	18,236
Smyth	1,796	17.58%	8,416	82.38%	4	0.04%	6,620	64.80%	10,216
Southampton	2,785	35.69%	5,013	64.24%	6	0.08%	2,228	28.55%	7,804
Spotsylvania	21,807	40.33%	32,231	59.61%	33	0.06%	10,424	19.28%	54,071
Stafford	25,863	45.13%	31,397	54.79%	49	0.09%	5,534	9.66%	57,309
Staunton	5,163	53.20%	4,528	46.66%	14	0.14%	−635	−6.54%	9,705
Suffolk	19,310	52.87%	17,184	47.05%	30	0.08%	−2,126	−5.82%	36,524
Surry	1,778	50.44%	1,742	49.42%	5	0.14%	−36	−1.02%	3,525
Sussex	2,038	51.03%	1,955	48.95%	1	0.03%	−83	−2.08%	3,994
Tazewell	1,952	14.10%	11,884	85.87%	4	0.03%	9,932	71.76%	13,840
Virginia Beach	74,430	46.11%	86,888	53.82%	110	0.07%	12,458	7.72%	161,428
Warren	4,488	28.66%	11,152	71.23%	17	0.11%	6,664	42.56%	15,657
Washington	4,573	20.88%	17,319	79.07%	10	0.05%	12,746	58.20%	21,902
Waynesboro	3,417	43.87%	4,361	55.99%	11	0.14%	944	12.12%	7,789
Westmoreland	3,037	40.13%	4,522	59.76%	8	0.11%	1,485	19.62%	7,567
Williamsburg	3,209	65.33%	1,701	34.63%	2	0.04%	−1,508	−30.70%	4,912
Winchester	4,421	52.29%	4,031	47.68%	3	0.04%	−390	−4.61%	8,455
Wise	1,878	16.37%	9,583	83.56%	8	0.07%	7,705	67.18%	11,469
Wythe	2,143	18.61%	9,364	81.33%	7	0.06%	7,221	62.71%	11,514
York	12,272	41.25%	17,460	58.69%	19	0.06%	5,188	17.44%	29,751
Totals	1,621,227	49.55%	1,647,534	50.36%	2,996	0.09%	26,307	0.80%	3,271,757

Counties and independent cities that flipped from Democratic to Republican

- Chesapeake (independent city)
- Montgomery (largest municipality: Blacksburg)
- Northampton (largest municipality: Exmore)
- Prince Edward (largest municipality: Farmville)
- Radford (independent city)
- Virginia Beach (independent city)

Counties and independent cities that flipped from Republican to Democratic

- Hopewell (independent city)

=== By congressional district ===
Miyares won six of 11 congressional districts, including two that were represented by Democrats.

District	Herring	Miyares	Representative
1st	41%	59%	Rob Wittman
2nd	46%	54%	Elaine Luria
3rd	63%	37%	Bobby Scott
4th	57%	43%	Donald McEachin
5th	41%	59%	Bob Good
6th	34%	65%	Ben Cline
7th	45%	55%	Abigail Spanberger
8th	73%	27%	Don Beyer
9th	26%	74%	Morgan Griffith
10th	53%	47%	Jennifer Wexton
11th	68%	32%	Gerry Connolly

== Exit poll ==
2021 Virginia Attorney General election voter demographics (CNN)
Demographic subgroup	Miyares	Herring	% of total vote
Ideology
Liberals	5	95	23
Moderates	39	61	41
Conservatives	93	7	36
Party
Democrats	2	98	36
Republicans	97	3	34
Independents	55	45	30
Gender
Men	55	44	48
Women	46	54	52
Race/ethnicity
White	61	39	73
Black	13	87	16
Latino	32	67	5
Asian	38	62	3
Gender by race
White men	65	35	36
White women	57	43	37
Black men	12	88	7
Black women	13	87	9
Latino men (of any race)	N/A	N/A	2
Latino women (of any race)	22	78	3
Other racial/ethnic groups	41	59	5
Age
18–24 years old	42	57	5
25–29 years old	43	57	5
30–39 years old	45	55	13
40–49 years old	51	49	18
50–64 years old	53	47	34
65 and older	54	46	26
2020 presidential vote
Biden	5	95	48
Trump	98	2	44
Biden job approval
Approve	6	94	46
Disapprove	90	10	53
Education
Never attended college	62	38	15
Some college education	58	42	24
Associate degree	55	45	12
Bachelor's degree	45	55	25
Advanced degree	39	61	24
Education by race
White college graduates	47	53	37
White no college degree	75	25	36
Non-white college graduates	24	76	11
Non-white no college degree	20	79	15
Education by gender/race
White women with college degrees	38	62	18
White women without college degrees	74	26	19
White men with college degrees	56	44	19
White men without college degrees	76	24	17
Non-white	22	78	27
Issue regarded as most important
Taxes	68	32	15
Economy	56	44	33
Education	50	49	24
Coronavirus	16	84	15
Abortion	55	45	8
Region
DC suburbs	35	65	29
Central Virginia	58	41	18
Hampton Roads	46	54	15
Richmond/Southside	49	50	18
Mountain	70	30	20
Area type
Urban	32	68	21
Suburban	53	47	60
Rural	64	36	19

== See also ==
- 2021 United States elections
- 2021 Virginia gubernatorial election
- 2021 Virginia lieutenant gubernatorial election
- 2021 Virginia House of Delegates election
- 2021 Virginia elections

== Notes ==
Partisan clients
