= 2021 Virginia House of Delegates election =

2021 Virginia House of Delegates elections
- November 2, 2021

All 100 seats in the Virginia House of Delegates 51 seats needed for a majority
- Turnout: 54.9% ▲12.5
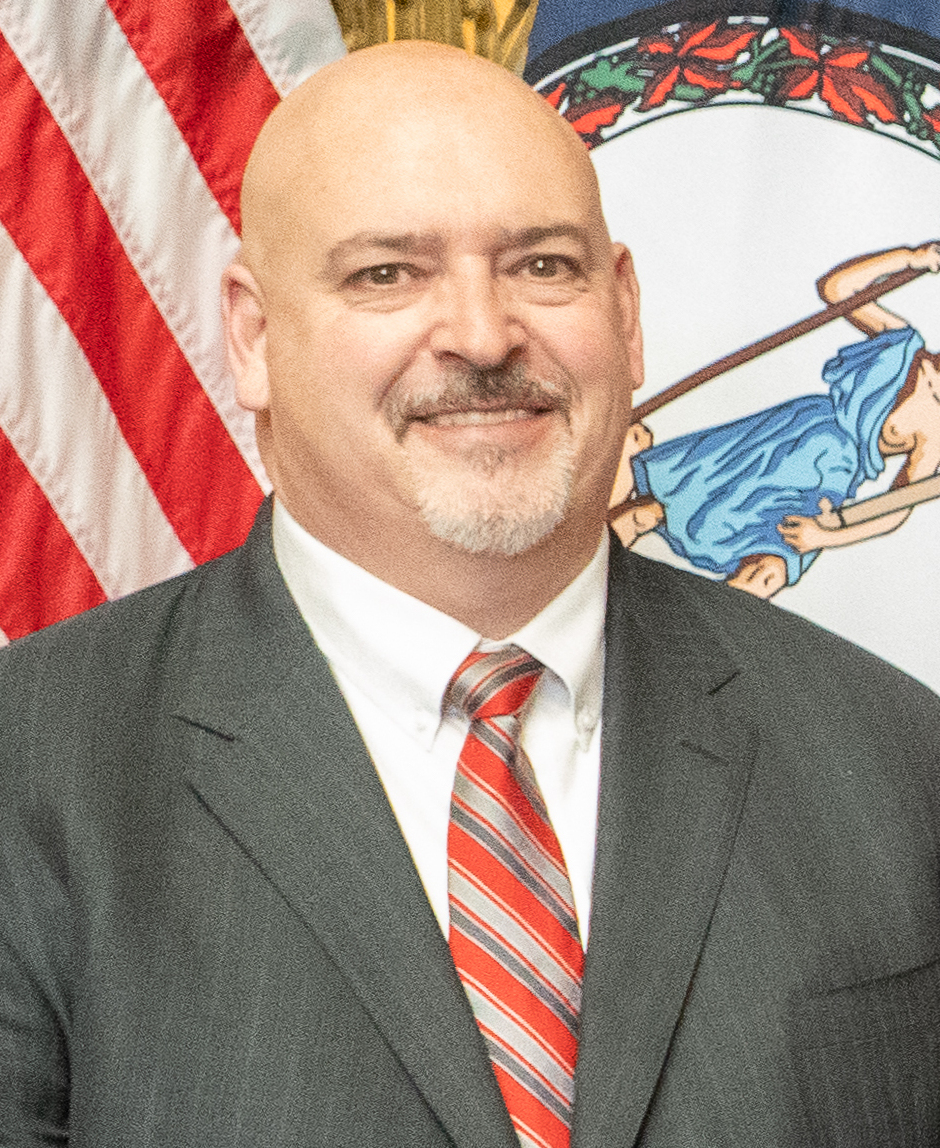

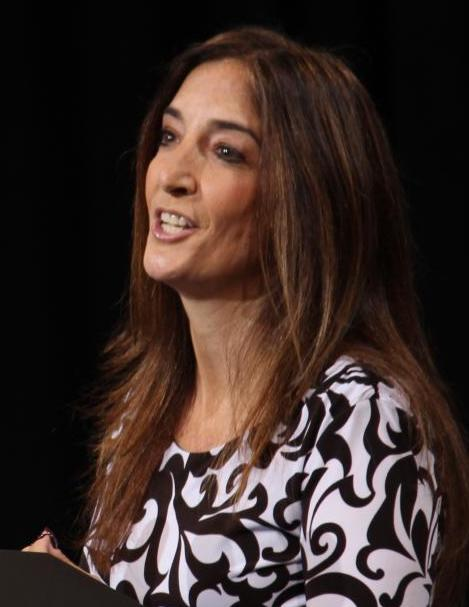
| | Majority party | Minority party |
|---|---|---|
| Leader | Todd Gilbert | Eileen Filler-Corn |
| Party | Republican | Democratic |
| Leader since | January 8, 2020 | January 1, 2019 |
| Leader's seat | 15th | 41st |
| Last election | 45 | 55 |
| Seats won | 52 | 48 |
| Seat change | ▲7 | ▼7 |
| Popular vote | 1,666,569 | 1,536,509 |
| Percentage | 51.56% | 47.54% |
| Swing | ▲8.3% | ▼5.2% |
- Republican gain Republican hold Democratic hold 50–60% 60–70% 70–80% 80–90% >90% 50–60% 60–70% 70–80% 80–90%
Speaker before election
Eileen Filler-Corn
Democratic
Elected Speaker
Todd Gilbert
Republican

The 2021 Virginia House of Delegates election for the 162nd Virginia General Assembly were held on November 2, 2021, to coincide with biennial elections in the U.S. state of Virginia. All 100 Delegates are elected to two-year terms in single-member constituencies. Primary elections took place on June 8. This election coincided with the 2021 Virginia Gubernatorial election, the Lieutenant Gubernatorial election, and lastly, the Attorney General election, all of which were won by Republicans. The upper house of the Virginia General Assembly, the Senate of Virginia, held its next elections on November 7, 2023.

The certified results showed Republicans flipping seven seats and regaining a majority in the House of Delegates. A recount in the 85th district, which concluded on December 3, showed incumbent Democrat Alex Askew gaining 12 votes, with Republican Karen Greenhalgh still winning by 115 votes. A recount in the 91st district, which concluded on December 8, showed incumbent Democrat Martha Mugler losing by 94 votes to Republican A.C. Cordoza.

== Background ==
Following the 2019 Virginia House of Delegates election, Democrats netted a gain of six seats. As a result, control of the Virginia House of Delegates flipped to Democratic control for the first time since 1999. Upon obtaining control of the chamber, House Democrats elected Eileen Filler-Corn as Speaker making her the first female Speaker in the history of the Virginia House of Delegates.

== Retirements ==
Five incumbents did not seek re-election either to retire or to seek other positions.

=== Democrats ===
One Democrat did not seek re-election.

1. District 51: Hala Ayala retired to run for lieutenant governor.

=== Republicans ===
Four Republicans did not seek re-election.

1. District 7: Nick Rush retired.
2. District 66: Kirk Cox retired to run for governor.
3. District 82: Jason Miyares retired to run for attorney general.
4. District 88: Mark Cole retired.

== Incumbents defeated ==
=== In primary elections ===
==== Democrats ====
Four Democrats lost renomination.

1. District 45: Mark Levine lost renomination to Elizabeth Bennett-Parker, who went on to win the general election.
2. District 50: Lee J. Carter lost renomination to Michelle Maldonado, who went on to win the general election.
3. District 79: Steve Heretick lost renomination to Nadarius Clark, who went on to win the general election.
4. District 86: Ibraheem Samirah lost renomination to Irene Shin, who went on to win the general election.

==== Republicans ====
One Republican lost renomination.

1. District 9: Charles Poindexter lost renomination to Wren Williams, who went on to win the general election.

=== In general elections ===
==== Democrats ====
Seven Democrats lost re-election to Republicans.

1. District 12: Chris Hurst (first elected in 2017) lost to Jason Ballard.
2. District 28: Joshua G. Cole (first elected in 2019) lost to Tara Durant.
3. District 63: Lashrecse Aird (first elected in 2015) lost to Kim Taylor.
4. District 75: Roslyn Tyler (first elected in 2005) lost to Otto Wachsmann.
5. District 83: Nancy Guy (first elected in 2019) lost to Tim Anderson.
6. District 85: Alex Askew (first elected in 2019) lost to Karen Greenhalgh.
7. District 91: Martha Mugler (first elected in 2019) lost to A.C. Cordoza.

==== Republicans ====
No Republicans lost re-election.

== Special elections ==
There were two special elections in 2021 to the 161st Virginia General Assembly, both held on January 5.

=== District 90 ===
Incumbent Democrat Joseph C. Lindsey, first elected in a 2014 special election, retired on November 10, 2020.

Virginia's 90th House of Delegates district, 2021 special election
| Party | Candidate | Votes | % |
|---|---|---|---|
| Democratic | Angelia Williams Graves | 3,691 | 63.5 |
| Republican | Sylvia Bryant | 2,114 | 36.4 |
| Write-in | | 6 | 0.1 |
| Total votes | | 5,811 | 100.0 |
| Democratic hold | | | |

=== District 2 ===
Incumbent Democrat Jennifer Carroll Foy, first elected in 2017, retired on December 12, 2020, to run for governor.

Virginia's 2nd House of Delegates district, 2021 special election
| Party | Candidate | Votes | % |
|---|---|---|---|
| Democratic | Candi King | 4,451 | 51.7 |
| Republican | Heather Mitchell | 4,143 | 48.2 |
| Write-in | | 9 | 0.1 |
| Total votes | | 8,603 | 100.0 |
| Democratic hold | | | |

== Predictions ==
| Source | Ranking | As of |
|---|---|---|
| Sabato's Crystal Ball | Tilt D | October 18, 2021 |
| Elections Daily | Tossup | November 1, 2021 |

== Results ==
=== Overview ===
The Republican Party showed a strong performance in 2021, gaining seven seats over the Democrats. Due to close races in Districts 85 and 91, recounts were requested by Democrats Alex Askew and Martha Mugler, who fell in close second places to their Republican challengers. On December 3, 2021, the recount in District 85 reaffirmed the victory of Republican Karen Greenhalgh, giving the Republican Party a majority in the House of Delegates and ending the Democratic Party's control over the chamber. District 91's recount, which took place on December 7, resulted in victory for Republican candidate A.C. Cordoza, making the final seat count 52 Republicans to 48 Democrats.

Both major parties fielded a record high number of candidates, with Republicans contesting 98 out of the 100 districts, and Democrats contesting 93.

↓
| 52 | 48 |
| Republican | Democratic |

| Parties | Candidates | Seats | | | | Popular Vote | | |
| Parties | Candidates | 2019 | 2021 | ± | Strength | Votes | % | Change |
|---|---|---|---|---|---|---|---|---|
| Republican | 98 | 45 | 52 | ▲7 | 52.00% | 1,666,569 | 51.56 | +8.25 |
| Democratic | 93 | 55 | 48 | ▼7 | 48.00% | 1,536,509 | 47.54 | -5.12 |
| Independent | 5 | 0 | 0 | Steady | 0.00% | 12,315 | 0.38 | -0.70 |
| Libertarian | 5 | 0 | 0 | Steady | 0.00% | 2,992 | 0.09 | -0.33 |
| Write-ins | – | 0 | 0 | Steady | 0.00% | 13,799 | 0.43 | -1.45 |
| Total | 201 | 100 | 100 | – | 100.00% | 3,232,184 | 100.00 | – |
| Turnout | | | | | | 3,296,705 | 55.39 | |
| Registered | | | | | | 5,951,368 | | |

=== Close races ===
Seats where the margin of victory was under 10%:

1. HD District 91, 0.33% gain
2. HD District 85, 0.44% gain
3. HD District 21, 1.15%
4. HD District 63, 1.54% gain
5. HD District 10, 1.97%
6. HD District 28, 2.02% gain
7. HD District 83, 2.34% gain
8. HD District 93, 3.26%
9. HD District 27, 3.62%
10. HD District 31, 4.23%
11. HD District 66, 4.91%
12. HD District 73, 5.03%
13. HD District 75, 5.17% gain
14. HD District 40, 5.39%
15. HD District 72, 6.13%
16. HD District 68, 6.32%
17. HD District 51, 6.94%
18. HD District 13, 8.61%
19. HD District 76, 9.38%
20. HD District 50, 9.60%

== List of districts ==
- Uncontested primaries are not reported by the Virginia Department of Elections.

=== District 1 ===
Incumbent Republican Terry Kilgore was first elected in 1993.

Virginia's 1st House of Delegates district, 2021
| Party | Candidate | Votes | % |
|---|---|---|---|
| Republican | Terry Kilgore (incumbent) | 21,910 | 97.3 |
| Write-in | | 602 | 2.7 |
| Total votes | | 22,512 | 100.0 |
| Republican hold | | | |

=== District 2 ===
Incumbent Democrat Candi King was first elected in a 2021 special election.

Democratic primary results
| Party | Candidate | Votes | % |
|---|---|---|---|
| Democratic | Candi King (incumbent) | 3,532 | 69.0 |
| Democratic | Pamela Montgomery | 1,584 | 31.0 |
| Total votes | | 5,116 | 100.0 |

Virginia's 2nd House of Delegates district, 2021
| Party | Candidate | Votes | % |
|---|---|---|---|
| Democratic | Candi King (incumbent) | 15,310 | 57.2 |
| Republican | Gina Ciarcia | 11,393 | 42.6 |
| Write-in | | 60 | 0.2 |
| Total votes | | 26,763 | 100.0 |
| Democratic hold | | | |

Candi King
- Joe Biden, 46th president of the United States (2021–present), 47th vice president of the United States (2009–2017), United States Senator from Delaware (1973–2009), Candidate for President of United States in 1988 & 2008
- Barack Obama. 44th president of the United States (2009–2017), United States Senator from Illinois (2005–2008)

=== District 3 ===
Incumbent Republican Will Morefield was first elected in 2009.

Virginia's 3rd House of Delegates district, 2021
| Party | Candidate | Votes | % |
|---|---|---|---|
| Republican | Will Morefield (incumbent) | 21,193 | 97.8 |
| Write-in | | 479 | 2.2 |
| Total votes | | 21,672 | 100.0 |
| Republican hold | | | |

=== District 4 ===
Incumbent Republican Will Wampler was first elected in 2019.

Virginia's 4th House of Delegates district, 2021
| Party | Candidate | Votes | % |
|---|---|---|---|
| Republican | Will Wampler (incumbent) | 22,965 | 95.8 |
| Write-in | | 1,000 | 4.2 |
| Total votes | | 23,965 | 100.0 |
| Republican hold | | | |

=== District 5 ===
Incumbent Republican Israel O'Quinn was first elected in 2011.

Virginia's 5th House of Delegates district, 2021
| Party | Candidate | Votes | % |
|---|---|---|---|
| Republican | Israel O'Quinn (incumbent) | 24,601 | 98.9 |
| Write-in | | 284 | 1.1 |
| Total votes | | 24,885 | 100.0 |
| Republican hold | | | |

=== District 6 ===
Incumbent Republican Jeff Campbell was first elected in 2013.

Virginia's 6th House of Delegates district, 2021
| Party | Candidate | Votes | % |
|---|---|---|---|
| Republican | Jeff Campbell (incumbent) | 25,454 | 96.8 |
| Write-in | | 838 | 3.2 |
| Total votes | | 26,292 | 100.0 |
| Republican hold | | | |

=== District 7 ===
Incumbent Republican Nick Rush was first elected in 2011. He is retiring.

Republican firehouse primary results
| Party | Candidate | Votes | % |
|---|---|---|---|
| Republican | Marie March | 1,387 | 54.2 |
| Republican | Sherri Blevins | 660 | 25.8 |
| Republican | Lowell Bowman | 514 | 20.1 |
| Total votes | | 2,561 | 100.0 |

Democratic primary results
| Party | Candidate | Votes | % |
|---|---|---|---|
| Democratic | Derek Kitts | 1,332 | 53.1 |
| Democratic | Tara Orlando | 1,176 | 46.9 |
| Total votes | | 2,508 | 100.0 |

Virginia's 7th House of Delegates district, 2021
| Party | Candidate | Votes | % |
|---|---|---|---|
| Republican | Marie March | 21,098 | 65.7 |
| Democratic | Derek Kitts | 10,914 | 34.0 |
| Write-in | | 122 | 0.4 |
| Total votes | | 32,134 | 100.0 |
| Republican hold | | | |

=== District 8 ===
Incumbent Republican Joseph McNamara was first elected in a 2018 special election. Democratic challenger Dustin Wimbish withdrew from the race on October 13, but his candidacy remained on the ballot.

Virginia's 8th House of Delegates district, 2021
| Party | Candidate | Votes | % |
|---|---|---|---|
| Republican | Joseph McNamara (incumbent) | 25,030 | 70.7 |
| Democratic | Dustin Wimbish | 10,090 | 28.5 |
| Write-in | | 272 | 0.8 |
| Total votes | | 35,392 | 100.0 |
| Republican hold | | | |

=== District 9 ===
Incumbent Republican Charles Poindexter was first elected in 2007. He lost renomination.

Republican primary results
| Party | Candidate | Votes | % |
|---|---|---|---|
| Republican | Wren Williams | 4,210 | 62.8 |
| Republican | Charles Poindexter (incumbent) | 2,493 | 37.2 |
| Total votes | | 6,703 | 100.0 |

Virginia's 9th House of Delegates district, 2021
| Party | Candidate | Votes | % |
|---|---|---|---|
| Republican | Wren Williams | 23,926 | 76.6 |
| Democratic | Bridgette Craighead | 7,210 | 23.1 |
| Write-in | | 89 | 0.3 |
| Total votes | | 31,225 | 100.0 |
| Republican hold | | | |

=== District 10 ===
Incumbent Democrat Wendy Gooditis was first elected in 2017.

Virginia's 10th House of Delegates district, 2021
| Party | Candidate | Votes | % |
|---|---|---|---|
| Democratic | Wendy Gooditis (incumbent) | 21,229 | 50.9 |
| Republican | Nick Clemente | 20,408 | 49.0 |
| Write-in | | 57 | 0.1 |
| Total votes | | 41,694 | 100.0 |
| Democratic hold | | | |

Wendy Gooditis
- Joe Biden, 46th president of the United States (2021–present), 47th vice president of the United States (2009–2017), United States Senator from Delaware (1973–2009), Candidate for President of United States in 1988 & 2008
- Barack Obama, 44th president of the United States (2009–2017), United States Senator from Illinois (2005–2008)

=== District 11 ===
Incumbent Democrat Sam Rasoul was first elected in 2013.

Virginia's 11th House of Delegates district, 2021
| Party | Candidate | Votes | % |
|---|---|---|---|
| Democratic | Sam Rasoul (incumbent) | 14,532 | 64.5 |
| Republican | Charlie Nave | 7,963 | 35.3 |
| Write-in | | 37 | 0.2 |
| Total votes | | 22,532 | 100.0 |
| Democratic hold | | | |

=== District 12 ===
Incumbent Democrat Chris Hurst was first elected in 2017.

Virginia's 12th House of Delegates district, 2021
| Party | Candidate | Votes | % |
|---|---|---|---|
| Republican | Jason Ballard | 13,871 | 55.1 |
| Democratic | Chris Hurst (incumbent) | 11,224 | 44.6 |
| Write-in | | 88 | 0.3 |
| Total votes | | 25,183 | 100.0 |
| Republican gain from Democratic | | | |

=== District 13 ===
Incumbent Democrat Danica Roem was first elected in 2017.

Virginia's 13th House of Delegates district, 2021
| Party | Candidate | Votes | % |
|---|---|---|---|
| Democratic | Danica Roem (incumbent) | 15,604 | 54.2 |
| Republican | Christopher Stone | 13,125 | 45.6 |
| Write-in | | 53 | 0.2 |
| Total votes | | 28,782 | 100.0 |
| Democratic hold | | | |

Danica Roem
- Barack Obama, 44th president of the United States (2009–2017), United States Senator from Illinois (2005–2008)

=== District 14 ===
Incumbent Republican Danny Marshall was first elected in 2001.

Virginia's 14th House of Delegates district, 2021
| Party | Candidate | Votes | % |
|---|---|---|---|
| Republican | Danny Marshall (incumbent) | 17,750 | 65.6 |
| Democratic | Rhett Deitz | 9,286 | 34.3 |
| Write-in | | 32 | 0.1 |
| Total votes | | 27,068 | 100.0 |
| Republican hold | | | |

=== District 15 ===
Incumbent Republican and House Minority Leader Todd Gilbert was first elected in 2005.

Virginia's 15th House of Delegates district, 2021
| Party | Candidate | Votes | % |
|---|---|---|---|
| Republican | Todd Gilbert (incumbent) | 26,613 | 77.7 |
| Democratic | Emily Scott | 7,601 | 22.2 |
| Write-in | | 41 | 0.1 |
| Total votes | | 34,255 | 100.0 |
| Republican hold | | | |

=== District 16 ===
Incumbent Republican Les Adams was first elected in 2013.

Virginia's 16th House of Delegates district, 2021
| Party | Candidate | Votes | % |
|---|---|---|---|
| Republican | Les Adams (incumbent) | 19,412 | 69.9 |
| Democratic | Chance Trevillian | 8,308 | 29.9 |
| Write-in | | 35 | 0.1 |
| Total votes | | 27,755 | 100.0 |
| Republican hold | | | |

=== District 17 ===
Incumbent Republican Chris Head was first elected in 2011.

Virginia's 17th House of Delegates district, 2021
| Party | Candidate | Votes | % |
|---|---|---|---|
| Republican | Chris Head (incumbent) | 26,102 | 92.8 |
| Write-in | | 2013 | 7.2 |
| Total votes | | 28,115 | 100.0 |
| Republican hold | | | |

=== District 18 ===
Incumbent Republican Michael Webert was first elected in 2011.

Virginia's 18th House of Delegates district, 2021
| Party | Candidate | Votes | % |
|---|---|---|---|
| Republican | Michael Webert (incumbent) | 25,737 | 65.9 |
| Democratic | Douglas Ward | 13,249 | 33.9 |
| Write-in | | 57 | 0.2 |
| Total votes | | 39,043 | 100.0 |
| Republican hold | | | |

=== District 19 ===
Incumbent Republican Terry Austin was first elected in 2013.

Virginia's 19th House of Delegates district, 2021
| Party | Candidate | Votes | % |
|---|---|---|---|
| Republican | Terry Austin (incumbent) | 27,515 | 78.3 |
| Democratic | Wendy Rowden | 6,918 | 19.7 |
| Libertarian | Dean D. Davison | 640 | 1.8 |
| Write-in | | 64 | 0.2 |
| Total votes | | 35,137 | 100.0 |
| Republican hold | | | |

=== District 20 ===
Incumbent Republican John Avoli was first elected in 2019.

Virginia's 20th House of Delegates district, 2021
| Party | Candidate | Votes | % |
|---|---|---|---|
| Republican | John Avoli (incumbent) | 21,978 | 63.7 |
| Democratic | Randall Wolf | 12,491 | 36.2 |
| Write-in | | 29 | 0.1 |
| Total votes | | 34,498 | 100.0 |
| Republican hold | | | |

=== District 21 ===
Incumbent Democrat Kelly Convirs-Fowler was first elected in 2017.

Virginia's 21st House of Delegates district, 2021
| Party | Candidate | Votes | % |
|---|---|---|---|
| Democratic | Kelly Convirs-Fowler (incumbent) | 15,162 | 50.5 |
| Republican | Tanya Gould | 14,818 | 49.4 |
| Write-in | | 40 | 0.1 |
| Total votes | | 30,020 | 100.0 |
| Democratic hold | | | |

Kelly Convirs-Fowler
- Barack Obama, 44th president of the United States (2009–2017), United States Senator from Illinois (2005–2008)

=== District 22 ===
Incumbent Republican Kathy Byron was first elected in 1997.

Republican primary results
| Party | Candidate | Votes | % |
|---|---|---|---|
| Republican | Kathy Byron (incumbent) | 3,197 | 81.22 |
| Republican | Isaiah J. Knight | 739 | 18.78 |
| Total votes | | 3,936 | 100.0 |

Virginia's 22nd House of Delegates district, 2021
| Party | Candidate | Votes | % |
|---|---|---|---|
| Republican | Kathy Byron (incumbent) | 23,922 | 72.6 |
| Democratic | Greg Eaton | 8,415 | 25.6 |
| Libertarian | Sarah Jerose | 537 | 1.6 |
| Write-in | | 52 | 0.2 |
| Total votes | | 32,926 | 100.0 |
| Republican hold | | | |

=== District 23 ===
Incumbent Republican Wendell Walker was first elected in 2019.

Virginia's 23rd House of Delegates district, 2021
| Party | Candidate | Votes | % |
|---|---|---|---|
| Republican | Wendell Walker (incumbent) | 22,045 | 66.6 |
| Democratic | Natalie Short | 11,007 | 33.2 |
| Write-in | | 64 | 0.2 |
| Total votes | | 33,116 | 100.0 |
| Republican hold | | | |

=== District 24 ===
Incumbent Republican Ronnie Campbell was first elected in a 2018 special election.

Republican primary results
| Party | Candidate | Votes | % |
|---|---|---|---|
| Republican | Ronnie Campbell (incumbent) | 2,089 | 87.5 |
| Republican | Mark Reed | 299 | 12.5 |
| Total votes | | 2,388 | 100.0 |

Virginia's 24th House of Delegates district, 2021
| Party | Candidate | Votes | % |
|---|---|---|---|
| Republican | Ronnie Campbell (incumbent) | 24,445 | 73.1 |
| Democratic | Sam Soghor | 8,934 | 26.7 |
| Write-in | | 66 | 0.2 |
| Total votes | | 33,445 | 100.0 |
| Republican hold | | | |

=== District 25 ===
Incumbent Republican Chris Runion was first elected in 2019.

Virginia's 25th House of Delegates district, 2021
| Party | Candidate | Votes | % |
|---|---|---|---|
| Republican | Chris Runion (incumbent) | 25,674 | 62.2 |
| Democratic | Jennifer Kitchen | 15,553 | 37.7 |
| Write-in | | 65 | 0.2 |
| Total votes | | 41,292 | 100.0 |
| Republican hold | | | |

=== District 26 ===
Incumbent Republican Tony Wilt was first elected in a 2010 special election.

Virginia's 26th House of Delegates district, 2021
| Party | Candidate | Votes | % |
|---|---|---|---|
| Republican | Tony Wilt (incumbent) | 15,062 | 59.3 |
| Democratic | William Helsley | 10,321 | 40.6 |
| Write-in | | 37 | 0.1 |
| Total votes | | 25,420 | 100.0 |
| Republican hold | | | |

=== District 27 ===
Incumbent Republican Roxann Robinson was first elected in a 2010 special election.

Virginia's 27th House of Delegates district, 2021
| Party | Candidate | Votes | % |
|---|---|---|---|
| Republican | Roxann Robinson (incumbent) | 19,047 | 51.7 |
| Democratic | Debra Gardner | 17,714 | 48.1 |
| Write-in | | 79 | 0.2 |
| Total votes | | 36,840 | 100.0 |
| Republican hold | | | |

Debra Gardner
- Barack Obama, 44th president of the United States (2009–2017), United States Senator from Illinois (2005–2008)

=== District 28 ===
Incumbent Democrat Joshua Cole was first elected in 2019.

Virginia's 28th House of Delegates district, 2021
| Party | Candidate | Votes | % |
|---|---|---|---|
| Republican | Tara Durant | 16,378 | 51.0 |
| Democratic | Joshua Cole (incumbent) | 15,731 | 48.9 |
| Write-in | | 39 | 0.1 |
| Total votes | | 32,148 | 100.0 |
| Republican gain from Democratic | | | |

Joshua G. Cole
- Barack Obama, 44th president of the United States (2009–2017), United States Senator from Illinois (2005–2008)

=== District 29 ===
Incumbent Republican Bill Wiley was first elected in a 2020 special election.

Virginia's 29th House of Delegates district, 2021
| Party | Candidate | Votes | % |
|---|---|---|---|
| Republican | Bill Wiley (incumbent) | 22,843 | 66.5 |
| Democratic | Delmara Bayliss | 11,458 | 33.4 |
| Write-in | | 41 | 0.1 |
| Total votes | | 34,342 | 100.0 |
| Republican hold | | | |

=== District 30 ===
Incumbent Republican Nick Freitas was first elected in 2015.

Virginia's 30th House of Delegates district, 2021
| Party | Candidate | Votes | % |
|---|---|---|---|
| Republican | Nick Freitas (incumbent) | 23,537 | 65.4 |
| Democratic | Annette Hyde | 12,392 | 34.4 |
| Write-in | | 50 | 0.1 |
| Total votes | | 35,979 | 100.0 |
| Republican hold | | | |

=== District 31 ===
Incumbent Democrat Elizabeth Guzmán was first elected in 2017.

Democratic primary results
| Party | Candidate | Votes | % |
|---|---|---|---|
| Democratic | Elizabeth Guzmán (incumbent) | 3,178 | 53.8 |
| Democratic | Rod Hall | 2,106 | 35.6 |
| Democratic | Idris O'Connor | 352 | 6.0 |
| Democratic | Kara Pitek | 274 | 4.6 |
| Total votes | | 5,910 | 100.0 |

Virginia's 31st House of Delegates district, 2021
| Party | Candidate | Votes | % |
|---|---|---|---|
| Democratic | Elizabeth Guzmán (incumbent) | 18,384 | 52.0 |
| Republican | Ben Baldwin | 16,888 | 47.8 |
| Write-in | | 54 | 0.2 |
| Total votes | | 35,326 | 100.0 |
| Democratic hold | | | |

Elizabeth Guzmán
- Barack Obama, 44th president of the United States (2009–2017), United States Senator from Illinois (2005–2008)

=== District 32 ===
Incumbent Democrat David Reid was first elected in 2017.

Virginia's 32nd House of Delegates district, 2021
| Party | Candidate | Votes | % |
|---|---|---|---|
| Democratic | David Reid (incumbent) | 23,839 | 57.9 |
| Republican | Scott Pio | 16,385 | 39.8 |
| Independent | Nicholas Allegro | 886 | 2.2 |
| Write-in | | 68 | 0.2 |
| Total votes | | 41,178 | 100.0 |
| Democratic hold | | | |

=== District 33 ===
Incumbent Republican Dave LaRock was first elected in 2013.

Virginia's 33rd House of Delegates district, 2021
| Party | Candidate | Votes | % |
|---|---|---|---|
| Republican | Dave LaRock (incumbent) | 25,188 | 58.2 |
| Democratic | Paul Siker | 18,049 | 41.7 |
| Write-in | | 54 | 0.1 |
| Total votes | | 43,291 | 100.0 |
| Republican hold | | | |

=== District 34 ===
Incumbent Democrat Kathleen Murphy was first elected in a 2015 special election.

Democratic primary results
| Party | Candidate | Votes | % |
|---|---|---|---|
| Democratic | Kathleen Murphy (incumbent) | 5,136 | 74.5 |
| Democratic | Jennifer Adeli | 1,760 | 25.5 |
| Total votes | | 6,896 | 100.0 |

Virginia's 34th House of Delegates district, 2021
| Party | Candidate | Votes | % |
|---|---|---|---|
| Democratic | Kathleen Murphy (incumbent) | 23,093 | 57.1 |
| Republican | Gary Pan | 17,327 | 42.8 |
| Write-in | | 46 | 0.1 |
| Total votes | | 40,466 | 100.0 |
| Democratic hold | | | |

=== District 35 ===
Incumbent Democrat Mark Keam was first elected in 2009.

Virginia's 35th House of Delegates district, 2021
| Party | Candidate | Votes | % |
|---|---|---|---|
| Democratic | Mark Keam (incumbent) | 24,226 | 68.7 |
| Republican | Kevin McGrath | 10,975 | 31.1 |
| Write-in | | 49 | 0.1 |
| Total votes | | 35,250 | 100.0 |
| Democratic hold | | | |

=== District 36 ===
Incumbent Democrat Ken Plum was first elected in 1981.

Democratic primary results
| Party | Candidate | Votes | % |
|---|---|---|---|
| Democratic | Ken Plum (incumbent) | 6,074 | 77.4 |
| Democratic | Mary Barthelson | 1,777 | 22.6 |
| Total votes | | 7,851 | 100.0 |

Virginia's 36th House of Delegates district, 2021
| Party | Candidate | Votes | % |
|---|---|---|---|
| Democratic | Ken Plum (incumbent) | 26,189 | 71.7 |
| Republican | Matthew Lang | 10,287 | 28.1 |
| Write-in | | 69 | 0.2 |
| Total votes | | 36,545 | 100.0 |
| Democratic hold | | | |

=== District 37 ===
Incumbent Democrat David Bulova was first elected in 2005.

Virginia's 37th House of Delegates district, 2021
| Party | Candidate | Votes | % |
|---|---|---|---|
| Democratic | David Bulova (incumbent) | 18,750 | 66.8 |
| Republican | Kenny Meteiver | 9,291 | 33.1 |
| Write-in | | 47 | 0.2 |
| Total votes | | 28,088 | 100.0 |
| Democratic hold | | | |

=== District 38 ===
Incumbent Democrat Kaye Kory was first elected in 2009.

Democratic primary results
| Party | Candidate | Votes | % |
|---|---|---|---|
| Democratic | Kaye Kory (incumbent) | 3,428 | 61.5 |
| Democratic | Holly Hazard | 2,150 | 38.5 |
| Total votes | | 5,578 | 100.0 |

Virginia's 38th House of Delegates district, 2021
| Party | Candidate | Votes | % |
|---|---|---|---|
| Democratic | Kaye Kory (incumbent) | 16,853 | 68.8 |
| Republican | Tom Pafford | 7,544 | 30.8 |
| Write-in | | 80 | 0.3 |
| Total votes | | 24,477 | 100.0 |
| Democratic hold | | | |

=== District 39 ===
Incumbent Democrat Vivian Watts was first elected in 1995.

Virginia's 39th House of Delegates district, 2021
| Party | Candidate | Votes | % |
|---|---|---|---|
| Democratic | Vivian Watts (incumbent) | 20,712 | 66.5 |
| Republican | Maureen Brody | 10,382 | 33.3 |
| Write-in | | 77 | 0.2 |
| Total votes | | 31,171 | 100.0 |
| Democratic hold | | | |

=== District 40 ===
Incumbent Democrat Dan Helmer was first elected in 2019.

Virginia's 40th House of Delegates district, 2021
| Party | Candidate | Votes | % |
|---|---|---|---|
| Democratic | Dan Helmer (incumbent) | 20,201 | 52.6 |
| Republican | Harold Pyon | 18,133 | 47.3 |
| Write-in | | 37 | 0.1 |
| Total votes | | 38,371 | 100.0 |
| Democratic hold | | | |

Dan Helmer
- Barack Obama, 44th president of the United States (2009–2017), United States Senator from Illinois (2005–2008)

=== District 41 ===
Incumbent Democrat and Speaker of the House Eileen Filler-Corn was first elected in a 2010 special election.

Virginia's 41st House of Delegates district, 2021
| Party | Candidate | Votes | % |
|---|---|---|---|
| Democratic | Eileen Filler-Corn (incumbent) | 23,201 | 65.1 |
| Republican | John M. Wolfe | 12,346 | 34.7 |
| Write-in | | 71 | 0.2 |
| Total votes | | 35,618 | 100.0 |
| Democratic hold | | | |

Eileen Filler-Corn
- Barack Obama, 44th president of the United States (2009–2017), United States Senator from Illinois (2005–2008)

=== District 42 ===
Incumbent Democrat Kathy Tran was first elected in 2017.

Virginia's 42nd House of Delegates district, 2021
| Party | Candidate | Votes | % |
|---|---|---|---|
| Democratic | Kathy Tran (incumbent) | 21,374 | 60.0 |
| Republican | Ed McGovern | 14,186 | 39.8 |
| Write-in | | 56 | 0.2 |
| Total votes | | 35,616 | 100.0 |
| Democratic hold | | | |

=== District 43 ===
Incumbent Democrat Mark Sickles was first elected in 2003.

Virginia's 43rd House of Delegates district, 2021
| Party | Candidate | Votes | % |
|---|---|---|---|
| Democratic | Mark Sickles (incumbent) | 22,447 | 70.2 |
| Republican | Brenton Hammond | 9,502 | 29.7 |
| Write-in | | 40 | 0.1 |
| Total votes | | 31,989 | 100.0 |
| Democratic hold | | | |

=== District 44 ===
Incumbent Democrat Paul Krizek was first elected in 2015.

Virginia's 44th House of Delegates district, 2021
| Party | Candidate | Votes | % |
|---|---|---|---|
| Democratic | Paul Krizek (incumbent) | 18,262 | 67.7 |
| Republican | Richard Hayden | 8,661 | 32.1 |
| Write-in | | 37 | 0.1 |
| Total votes | | 26,960 | 100.0 |
| Democratic hold | | | |

=== District 45 ===
Incumbent Democrat Mark Levine was first elected in 2015. He lost renomination.

Democratic primary results
| Party | Candidate | Votes | % |
|---|---|---|---|
| Democratic | Elizabeth Bennett-Parker | 9,310 | 59.3 |
| Democratic | Mark Levine (incumbent) | 6,402 | 40.8 |
| Total votes | | 15,712 | 100.0 |

Virginia's 45th House of Delegates district, 2021
| Party | Candidate | Votes | % |
|---|---|---|---|
| Democratic | Elizabeth Bennett-Parker | 31,310 | 73.7 |
| Republican | JD Maddox | 11,069 | 26.1 |
| Write-in | | 117 | 0.3 |
| Total votes | | 42,496 | 100.0 |
| Democratic hold | | | |

=== District 46 ===
Incumbent Democrat and House Majority Leader Charniele Herring was first elected in 2009.

Virginia's 46th House of Delegates district, 2021
| Party | Candidate | Votes | % |
|---|---|---|---|
| Democratic | Charniele Herring (incumbent) | 20,445 | 92.2 |
| Write-in | | 1,740 | 7.8 |
| Total votes | | 22,185 | 100.0 |
| Democratic hold | | | |

=== District 47 ===
Incumbent Democrat Patrick Hope was first elected in 2009.

Virginia's 47th House of Delegates district, 2021
| Party | Candidate | Votes | % |
|---|---|---|---|
| Democratic | Patrick Hope (incumbent) | 31,078 | 78.2 |
| Republican | Laura Hall | 8,549 | 21.5 |
| Write-in | | 112 | 0.3 |
| Total votes | | 39,739 | 100.0 |
| Democratic hold | | | |

=== District 48 ===
Incumbent Democrat Rip Sullivan was first elected in a 2014 special election.

Virginia's 48th House of Delegates district, 2021
| Party | Candidate | Votes | % |
|---|---|---|---|
| Democratic | Rip Sullivan (incumbent) | 28,545 | 72.1 |
| Republican | Ed Monroe | 10,937 | 27.6 |
| Write-in | | 95 | 0.2 |
| Total votes | | 39,577 | 100.0 |
| Democratic hold | | | |

=== District 49 ===
Incumbent Democrat and House Majority Whip Alfonso Lopez was first elected in 2011.

Democratic primary results
| Party | Candidate | Votes | % |
|---|---|---|---|
| Democratic | Alfonso Lopez (incumbent) | 4,819 | 70.5 |
| Democratic | Karishma Mehta | 2,015 | 29.5 |
| Total votes | | 6,834 | 100.0 |

Virginia's 49th House of Delegates district, 2021
| Party | Candidate | Votes | % |
|---|---|---|---|
| Democratic | Alfonso Lopez (incumbent) | 19,799 | 76.5 |
| Republican | Timothy Kilcullen | 5,013 | 19.4 |
| Independent | Terry Modglin | 1,004 | 3.9 |
| Write-in | | 52 | 0.2 |
| Total votes | | 25,868 | 100.0 |
| Democratic hold | | | |

=== District 50 ===
Incumbent Democrat Lee Carter was first elected in 2017. He lost renomination.

Primary results by county: Maldonado: 40–50%; 50–60%; 80–90%; Carter: 30–40%; 40–50%

Democratic primary results
| Party | Candidate | Votes | % |
|---|---|---|---|
| Democratic | Michelle Maldonado | 1,548 | 44.1 |
| Democratic | Lee Carter (incumbent) | 1,348 | 38.4 |
| Democratic | Helen Zurita | 617 | 17.6 |
| Total votes | | 3,513 | 100.0 |

Republican firehouse primary results
| Party | Candidate | Votes | % |
|---|---|---|---|
| Republican | Steve Pleickhardt | 266 | 61.1 |
| Republican | Mike Allers Jr. | 169 | 38.9 |
| Total votes | | 435 | 100 |

Virginia's 50th House of Delegates district, 2021
| Party | Candidate | Votes | % |
|---|---|---|---|
| Democratic | Michelle Maldonado | 14,426 | 54.7 |
| Republican | Steve Pleickhardt | 11,893 | 45.1 |
| Write-in | | 52 | 0.2 |
| Total votes | | 26,371 | 100.0 |
| Democratic hold | | | |

Michelle Maldonado
- Barack Obama, 44th president of the United States (2009–2017), United States Senator from Illinois (2005–2008)

=== District 51 ===
Incumbent Democrat Hala Ayala was first elected in 2017. She is retiring to run for lieutenant governor.

Republican primary results
| Party | Candidate | Votes | % |
|---|---|---|---|
| Republican | Tim Cox | 1,270 | 76.6 |
| Republican | Jeff Dove | 388 | 23.4 |
| Total votes | | 1,658 | 100.0 |

Virginia's 51st House of Delegates district, 2021
| Party | Candidate | Votes | % |
|---|---|---|---|
| Democratic | Briana Sewell | 19,038 | 53.4 |
| Republican | Tim Cox | 16,566 | 46.5 |
| Write-in | | 43 | 0.1 |
| Total votes | | 35,647 | 100.0 |
| Democratic hold | | | |

Briana Sewell
- Barack Obama, 44th president of the United States (2009–2017), United States Senator from Illinois (2005–2008)

=== District 52 ===
Incumbent Democrat Luke Torian was first elected in 2009.

Virginia's 52nd House of Delegates district, 2021
| Party | Candidate | Votes | % |
|---|---|---|---|
| Democratic | Luke Torian (incumbent) | 15,196 | 70.0 |
| Republican | Maria Martin | 6,457 | 29.8 |
| Write-in | | 42 | 0.2 |
| Total votes | | 21,695 | 100.0 |
| Democratic hold | | | |

=== District 53 ===
Incumbent Democrat Marcus Simon was first elected in 2013.

Virginia's 53rd House of Delegates district, 2021
| Party | Candidate | Votes | % |
|---|---|---|---|
| Democratic | Marcus Simon (incumbent) | 22,741 | 72.0 |
| Republican | Sarah White | 8,806 | 27.9 |
| Write-in | | 57 | 0.2 |
| Total votes | | 31,604 | 100.0 |
| Democratic hold | | | |

=== District 54 ===
Incumbent Republican Bobby Orrock was first elected in 1989.

Virginia's 54th House of Delegates district, 2021
| Party | Candidate | Votes | % |
|---|---|---|---|
| Republican | Bobby Orrock (incumbent) | 21,231 | 60.9 |
| Democratic | Eric Butterworth | 13,616 | 39.0 |
| Write-in | | 42 | 0.1 |
| Total votes | | 34,889 | 100.0 |
| Republican hold | | | |

=== District 55 ===
Incumbent Republican Buddy Fowler was first elected in 2013.

Virginia's 55th House of Delegates district, 2021
| Party | Candidate | Votes | % |
|---|---|---|---|
| Republican | Buddy Fowler (incumbent) | 27,246 | 63.8 |
| Democratic | Rachel Levy | 15,400 | 36.1 |
| Write-in | | 51 | 0.1 |
| Total votes | | 42,697 | 100.0 |
| Republican hold | | | |

=== District 56 ===
Incumbent Republican John McGuire was first elected in 2017.

Virginia's 56th House of Delegates district, 2021
| Party | Candidate | Votes | % |
|---|---|---|---|
| Republican | John McGuire (incumbent) | 27,706 | 61.6 |
| Democratic | Blakely Lockhart | 17,187 | 38.2 |
| Write-in | | 65 | 0.1 |
| Total votes | | 44,958 | 100.0 |
| Republican hold | | | |

=== District 57 ===
Incumbent Democrat Sally Hudson was first elected in 2019.

Virginia's 57th House of Delegates district, 2021
| Party | Candidate | Votes | % |
|---|---|---|---|
| Democratic | Sally Hudson (incumbent) | 25,227 | 78.5 |
| Republican | Philip Hamilton | 6,847 | 21.3 |
| Write-in | | 73 | 0.2 |
| Total votes | | 32,147 | 100.0 |
| Democratic hold | | | |

=== District 58 ===
Incumbent Republican Rob Bell was first elected in 2001.

Virginia's 58th House of Delegates district, 2021
| Party | Candidate | Votes | % |
|---|---|---|---|
| Republican | Rob Bell (incumbent) | 25,835 | 63.2 |
| Democratic | Sara Ratcliffe | 14,999 | 36.7 |
| Write-in | | 36 | 0.1 |
| Total votes | | 40,870 | 100.0 |
| Republican hold | | | |

=== District 59 ===
Incumbent Republican Matt Fariss was first elected in 2011.

Virginia's 59th House of Delegates district, 2021
| Party | Candidate | Votes | % |
|---|---|---|---|
| Republican | Matt Fariss (incumbent) | 22,891 | 64.6 |
| Democratic | Ben Moses | 11,421 | 32.2 |
| Independent | Louis Scicli | 1,105 | 3.1 |
| Write-in | | 41 | 0.1 |
| Total votes | | 35,458 | 100.0 |
| Republican hold | | | |

=== District 60 ===
Incumbent Republican James Edmunds was first elected in 2019.

Virginia's 60th House of Delegates district, 2021
| Party | Candidate | Votes | % |
|---|---|---|---|
| Republican | James Edmunds (incumbent) | 21,128 | 95.0 |
| Write-in | | 1120 | 5.0 |
| Total votes | | 22,248 | 100.0 |
| Republican hold | | | |

=== District 61 ===
Incumbent Republican Tommy Wright was first elected in a 2000 special election.

Virginia's 61st House of Delegates district, 2021
| Party | Candidate | Votes | % |
|---|---|---|---|
| Republican | Tommy Wright (incumbent) | 20,976 | 67.5 |
| Democratic | Trudy Berry | 9,418 | 30.3 |
| Libertarian | Joe Paschal | 675 | 2.2 |
| Write-in | | 20 | 0.1 |
| Total votes | | 31,089 | 100.0 |
| Republican hold | | | |

=== District 62 ===
Incumbent Republican Carrie Coyner was first elected in 2019.

Virginia's 62nd House of Delegates district, 2021
| Party | Candidate | Votes | % |
|---|---|---|---|
| Republican | Carrie Coyner (incumbent) | 16,679 | 56.4 |
| Democratic | Jasmine Gore | 12,830 | 43.4 |
| Write-in | | 69 | 0.2 |
| Total votes | | 29,578 | 100.0 |
| Republican hold | | | |

=== District 63 ===
Incumbent Democrat Lashrecse Aird was first elected in 2015.

Virginia's 63rd House of Delegates district, 2021
| Party | Candidate | Votes | % |
|---|---|---|---|
| Republican | Kim Taylor | 16,813 | 50.7 |
| Democratic | Lashrecse Aird (incumbent) | 16,301 | 49.2 |
| Write-in | | 45 | 0.1 |
| Total votes | | 33,159 | 100.0 |
| Republican gain from Democratic | | | |

Lashrecse Aird
- Barack Obama, 44th president of the United States (2009–2017), United States Senator from Illinois (2005–2008)

=== District 64 ===
Incumbent Republican Emily Brewer was first elected in 2017.

Virginia's 64th House of Delegates district, 2021
| Party | Candidate | Votes | % |
|---|---|---|---|
| Republican | Emily Brewer (incumbent) | 24,903 | 65.0 |
| Democratic | Michael Drewry | 13,398 | 34.9 |
| Write-in | | 40 | 0.1 |
| Total votes | | 38,341 | 100.0 |
| Republican hold | | | |

=== District 65 ===
Incumbent Republican Lee Ware was first elected in a 1998 special election.

Virginia's 65th House of Delegates district, 2021
| Party | Candidate | Votes | % |
|---|---|---|---|
| Republican | Lee Ware (incumbent) | 33,621 | 66.0 |
| Democratic | Caitlin Coakley | 17,235 | 33.8 |
| Write-in | | 75 | 0.2 |
| Total votes | | 50,931 | 100.0 |
| Republican hold | | | |

=== District 66 ===
Incumbent Republican Kirk Cox was first elected in 1989. He is retiring to run for governor.

Democratic primary results
| Party | Candidate | Votes | % |
|---|---|---|---|
| Democratic | Katie Sponsler | 2,823 | 59.8 |
| Democratic | Linnard K. Harris, Sr. | 1,902 | 40.3 |
| Total votes | | 4,725 | 100.0 |

Virginia's 66th House of Delegates district, 2021
| Party | Candidate | Votes | % |
|---|---|---|---|
| Republican | Mike Cherry | 16,833 | 52.3 |
| Democratic | Katie Sponsler | 15,254 | 47.4 |
| Write-in | | 87 | 0.3 |
| Total votes | | 32,174 | 100.0 |
| Republican hold | | | |

=== District 67 ===
Incumbent Democrat Karrie Delaney was first elected in 2017.

Virginia's 67th House of Delegates district, 2021
| Party | Candidate | Votes | % |
|---|---|---|---|
| Democratic | Karrie Delaney (incumbent) | 21,111 | 60.7 |
| Republican | Bob Frizzelle | 13,649 | 39.2 |
| Write-in | | 44 | 0.1 |
| Total votes | | 34,804 | 100.0 |
| Democratic hold | | | |

=== District 68 ===
Incumbent Democrat Dawn Adams was first elected in 2017.

Democratic primary results
| Party | Candidate | Votes | % |
|---|---|---|---|
| Democratic | Dawn Adams (incumbent) | 5,112 | 61.49 |
| Democratic | Kyle Elliott | 3,201 | 38.51 |
| Total votes | | 8,313 | 100.0 |

Republican primary results
| Party | Candidate | Votes | % |
|---|---|---|---|
| Republican | Mark Earley Jr. | 2,034 | 91.42 |
| Republican | Mike Dickinson | 191 | 8.58 |
| Total votes | | 2,225 | 100.0 |

Virginia's 68th House of Delegates district, 2021
| Party | Candidate | Votes | % |
|---|---|---|---|
| Democratic | Dawn Adams (incumbent) | 24,624 | 53.1 |
| Republican | Mark Earley Jr. | 21,693 | 46.8 |
| Write-in | | 54 | 0.1 |
| Total votes | | 46,371 | 100.0 |
| Democratic hold | | | |

=== District 69 ===
Incumbent Democrat Betsy Carr was first elected in 2009.

Virginia's 69th House of Delegates district, 2021
| Party | Candidate | Votes | % |
|---|---|---|---|
| Democratic | Betsy Carr (incumbent) | 21,470 | 85.2 |
| Republican | Sheila Furey | 3,690 | 14.7 |
| Write-in | | 34 | 0.1 |
| Total votes | | 25,194 | 100.0 |
| Democratic hold | | | |

=== District 70 ===
Incumbent Democrat Delores McQuinn was first elected in 2009.

Virginia's 70th House of Delegates district, 2021
| Party | Candidate | Votes | % |
|---|---|---|---|
| Democratic | Delores McQuinn (incumbent) | 21,764 | 71.5 |
| Independent | Dave Vaught | 8,435 | 27.7 |
| Write-in | | 230 | 0.8 |
| Total votes | | 30,429 | 100.0 |
| Democratic hold | | | |

=== District 71 ===
Incumbent Democrat Jeff Bourne was first elected in 2017.

Democratic primary results
| Party | Candidate | Votes | % |
|---|---|---|---|
| Democratic | Jeff Bourne (incumbent) | 5,751 | 69.25 |
| Democratic | Richard Walker | 2,554 | 30.75 |
| Total votes | | 8,305 | 100.0 |

Virginia's 71st House of Delegates district, 2021
| Party | Candidate | Votes | % |
|---|---|---|---|
| Democratic | Jeff Bourne (incumbent) | 25,587 | 85.6 |
| Republican | Nancye Hunter | 4,241 | 14.2 |
| Write-in | | 70 | 0.2 |
| Total votes | | 29,898 | 100.0 |
| Democratic hold | | | |

=== District 72 ===
Incumbent Democrat Schuyler VanValkenburg was first elected in 2017.

Republican primary results
| Party | Candidate | Votes | % |
|---|---|---|---|
| Republican | Christopher Holmes | 1,069 | 70.4 |
| Republican | Tom Gardner | 449 | 29.6 |
| Total votes | | 1,518 | 100.0 |

Virginia's 72nd House of Delegates district, 2021
| Party | Candidate | Votes | % |
|---|---|---|---|
| Democratic | Schuyler VanValkenburg (incumbent) | 19,710 | 53.0 |
| Republican | Christopher Holmes | 17,427 | 46.8 |
| Write-in | | 63 | 0.2 |
| Total votes | | 37,200 | 100.0 |
| Democratic hold | | | |

Schuyler VanValkenburg
- Barack Obama, 44th president of the United States (2009–2017), United States Senator from Illinois (2005–2008)

=== District 73 ===
Incumbent Democrat Rodney Willett was first elected in 2019.

Virginia's 73rd House of Delegates district, 2021
| Party | Candidate | Votes | % |
|---|---|---|---|
| Democratic | Rodney Willett (incumbent) | 17,972 | 52.5 |
| Republican | Mary Margaret Kastelberg | 16,248 | 47.4 |
| Write-in | | 45 | 0.1 |
| Total votes | | 34,265 | 100.0 |
| Democratic hold | | | |

Rodney Willett
- Barack Obama, 44th president of the United States (2009–2017), United States Senator from Illinois (2005–2008)

=== District 74 ===
Incumbent Democrat Lamont Bagby was first elected in 2015.

Democratic primary results
| Party | Candidate | Votes | % |
|---|---|---|---|
| Democratic | Lamont Bagby (incumbent) | 7,894 | 91.4 |
| Democratic | John Dantzler | 743 | 8.6 |
| Total votes | | 8,637 | 100.0 |

Virginia's 74th House of Delegates district, 2021
| Party | Candidate | Votes | % |
|---|---|---|---|
| Democratic | Lamont Bagby (incumbent) | 22,913 | 72.6 |
| Republican | Jimmy Brooks | 8,539 | 27.0 |
| Write-in | | 113 | 0.4 |
| Total votes | | 31,565 | 100.0 |
| Democratic hold | | | |

=== District 75 ===
Incumbent Democrat Roslyn Tyler was first elected in 2005.

Virginia's 75th House of Delegates district, 2021
| Party | Candidate | Votes | % |
|---|---|---|---|
| Republican | Otto Wachsmann | 14,487 | 52.5 |
| Democratic | Roslyn Tyler (incumbent) | 13,061 | 47.4 |
| Write-in | | 37 | 0.1 |
| Total votes | | 27,585 | 100.0 |
| Republican gain from Democratic | | | |

=== District 76 ===
Incumbent Democrat Clint Jenkins was first elected in 2019.

Virginia's 76th House of Delegates district, 2021
| Party | Candidate | Votes | % |
|---|---|---|---|
| Democratic | Clint Jenkins (incumbent) | 18,353 | 53.3 |
| Republican | Michael Dillender | 15,123 | 44.0 |
| Independent | Craig Warren | 885 | 2.6 |
| Write-in | | 52 | 0.1 |
| Total votes | | 34,413 | 100.0 |
| Democratic hold | | | |

=== District 77 ===
Incumbent Democrat Cliff Hayes Jr. was first elected in a 2016 special election.

Virginia's 77th House of Delegates district, 2021
| Party | Candidate | Votes | % |
|---|---|---|---|
| Democratic | Cliff Hayes Jr. (incumbent) | 16,135 | 61.1 |
| Republican | Geoffrey Burke | 10,201 | 38.6 |
| Write-in | | 82 | 0.3 |
| Total votes | | 26,418 | 100.0 |
| Democratic hold | | | |

=== District 78 ===
Incumbent Republican Jay Leftwich was first elected in 2013.

Virginia's 78th House of Delegates district, 2021
| Party | Candidate | Votes | % |
|---|---|---|---|
| Republican | Jay Leftwich (incumbent) | 24,907 | 66.0 |
| Democratic | Melanie Cornelisse | 12,788 | 33.9 |
| Write-in | | 66 | 0.2 |
| Total votes | | 37,761 | 100.0 |
| Republican hold | | | |

=== District 79 ===
Incumbent Democrat Steve Heretick was first elected in 2015. He lost renomination.

Democratic primary results
| Party | Candidate | Votes | % |
|---|---|---|---|
| Democratic | Nadarius Clark | 2,033 | 45.73 |
| Democratic | Steve Heretick (incumbent) | 1,883 | 42.35 |
| Democratic | Dante Walston | 530 | 11.92 |
| Total votes | | 4,446 | 100.0 |

Virginia's 79th House of Delegates district, 2021
| Party | Candidate | Votes | % |
|---|---|---|---|
| Democratic | Nadarius Clark | 10,647 | 56.1 |
| Republican | Lawrence Mason | 8,283 | 43.6 |
| Write-in | | 63 | 0.3 |
| Total votes | | 18,993 | 100.0 |
| Democratic hold | | | |

=== District 80 ===
Incumbent Democrat Don Scott was first elected in 2019.

Virginia's 80th House of Delegates district, 2021
| Party | Candidate | Votes | % |
|---|---|---|---|
| Democratic | Don Scott (incumbent) | 15,703 | 66.1 |
| Republican | Deanna Stanton | 8,012 | 33.7 |
| Write-in | | 51 | 0.2 |
| Total votes | | 23,766 | 100.0 |
| Democratic hold | | | |

=== District 81 ===
Incumbent Republican Barry Knight was first elected in 2009.

Virginia's 81st House of Delegates district, 2021
| Party | Candidate | Votes | % |
|---|---|---|---|
| Republican | Barry Knight (incumbent) | 17,271 | 57.7 |
| Democratic | Jeffrey Feld | 12,503 | 41.8 |
| Write-in | | 161 | 0.5 |
| Total votes | | 29,935 | 100.0 |
| Republican hold | | | |

=== District 82 ===
Incumbent Republican Jason Miyares was first elected in 2015. He is retiring to run for attorney general.

Republican firehouse primary results
| Party | Candidate | Votes | % |
|---|---|---|---|
| Republican | Anne Ferrell Tata | 927 | 60.8 |
| Republican | Kathy Owens | 598 | 39.2 |
| Total votes | | 1,525 | 100.0 |

Virginia's 82nd House of Delegates district, 2021
| Party | Candidate | Votes | % |
|---|---|---|---|
| Republican | Anne Ferrell Tata | 20,768 | 59.3 |
| Democratic | Scott Flax | 14,196 | 40.6 |
| Write-in | | 29 | 0.1 |
| Total votes | | 34,993 | 100.0 |
| Republican hold | | | |

=== District 83 ===
Incumbent Democrat Nancy Guy was first elected in 2019.

Republican primary results
| Party | Candidate | Votes | % |
|---|---|---|---|
| Republican | Tim Anderson | 1,477 | 48.1 |
| Republican | Chris Stolle | 1,449 | 47.2 |
| Republican | Phil Kazmierczak | 146 | 4.8 |
| Total votes | | 3,072 | 100.0 |

Virginia's 83rd House of Delegates district, 2021
| Party | Candidate | Votes | % |
|---|---|---|---|
| Republican | Tim Anderson | 14,456 | 51.1 |
| Democratic | Nancy Guy (incumbent) | 13,793 | 48.8 |
| Write-in | | 35 | 0.1 |
| Total votes | | 28,284 | 100.0 |
| Republican gain from Democratic | | | |

Nancy Guy
- Barack Obama, 44th president of the United States (2009–2017), United States Senator from Illinois (2005–2008)

=== District 84 ===
Incumbent Republican Glenn Davis was first elected in 2013.

Democratic primary results
| Party | Candidate | Votes | % |
|---|---|---|---|
| Democratic | Kim Melnyk | 1,876 | 52.6 |
| Democratic | Tracie Liguid | 1,691 | 47.4 |
| Total votes | | 3,567 | 100.0 |

Virginia's 84th House of Delegates district, 2021
| Party | Candidate | Votes | % |
|---|---|---|---|
| Republican | Glenn Davis (incumbent) | 15,400 | 55.6 |
| Democratic | Kim Melnyk | 12,232 | 44.2 |
| Write-in | | 53 | 0.2 |
| Total votes | | 27,685 | 100.0 |
| Republican hold | | | |

Kim Melnyk
- Barack Obama, 44th president of the United States (2009–2017), United States Senator from Illinois (2005–2008)

=== District 85 ===
Incumbent Democrat Alex Askew was first elected in 2019.

Virginia's 85th House of Delegates district, 2021
| Party | Candidate | Votes | % |
|---|---|---|---|
| Republican | Karen Greenhalgh | 14,270 | 50.2 |
| Democratic | Alex Askew (incumbent) | 14,143 | 49.7 |
| Write-in | | 29 | 0.1 |
| Total votes | | 28,442 | 100.0 |
| Republican gain from Democratic | | | |

Alex Askew
- Barack Obama, 44th president of the United States (2009–2017), United States Senator from Illinois (2005–2008)

=== District 86 ===
Incumbent Democrat Ibraheem Samirah was first elected in 2019. He lost renomination to Irene Shin, who was elected with 65.4% of the vote.

Democratic primary results
| Party | Candidate | Votes | % |
|---|---|---|---|
| Democratic | Irene Shin | 3,415 | 51.7 |
| Democratic | Ibraheem Samirah (incumbent) | 3,185 | 48.3 |
| Total votes | | 6,600 | 100.0 |

Virginia's 86th House of Delegates district, 2021
| Party | Candidate | Votes | % |
|---|---|---|---|
| Democratic | Irene Shin | 19,296 | 65.4 |
| Republican | Julie Perry | 10,116 | 34.3 |
| Write-in | | 90 | 0.3 |
| Total votes | | 29,502 | 100.0 |
| Democratic hold | | | |

=== District 87 ===
Incumbent Democrat Suhas Subramanyam was first elected in 2019.

Virginia's 87th House of Delegates district, 2021
| Party | Candidate | Votes | % |
|---|---|---|---|
| Democratic | Suhas Subramanyam (incumbent) | 24,348 | 58.4 |
| Republican | Greg Moulthrop | 17,273 | 41.4 |
| Write-in | | 56 | 0.1 |
| Total votes | | 41,677 | 100.0 |
| Democratic hold | | | |

=== District 88 ===
Incumbent Republican Mark Cole was first elected in 2001. He is retiring.

Republican firehouse primary results
| Party | Candidate | Votes | % |
|---|---|---|---|
| Republican | Phillip Scott | 614 | 45.9 |
| Republican | Rich Breeden | 536 | 40.1 |
| Republican | Holly Hazard | 187 | 14.0 |
| Total votes | | 1,337 | 100.0 |

Virginia's 88th House of Delegates district, 2021
| Party | Candidate | Votes | % |
|---|---|---|---|
| Republican | Phillip Scott | 22,747 | 57.4 |
| Democratic | Kecia Evans | 16,158 | 40.7 |
| Libertarian | Tim Lewis | 723 | 1.8 |
| Write-in | | 32 | 0.1 |
| Total votes | | 39,660 | 100.0 |
| Republican hold | | | |

=== District 89 ===
Incumbent Democrat Jay Jones was first elected in 2017.

Democratic primary results
| Party | Candidate | Votes | % |
|---|---|---|---|
| Democratic | Jay Jones (incumbent) | 4,607 | 78.1 |
| Democratic | Hannah Kinder | 1,293 | 21.9 |
| Total votes | | 5,900 | 100.0 |

Virginia's 89th House of Delegates district, 2021
| Party | Candidate | Votes | % |
|---|---|---|---|
| Democratic | Jay Jones (incumbent) | 17,450 | 79.8 |
| Republican | Hahns Copeland | 4,340 | 19.9 |
| Write-in | | 63 | 0.3 |
| Total votes | | 21,853 | 100.0 |
| Democratic hold | | | |

=== District 90 ===
Incumbent Democrat Angelia Williams Graves was first elected in a 2021 special election.

Virginia's 90th House of Delegates district, 2021
| Party | Candidate | Votes | % |
|---|---|---|---|
| Democratic | Angelia Williams Graves (incumbent) | 14,295 | 64.5 |
| Republican | Sylvia Bryant | 7,831 | 35.3 |
| Write-in | | 52 | 0.2 |
| Total votes | | 22,178 | 100.0 |
| Democratic hold | | | |

=== District 91 ===
Incumbent Democrat Martha Mugler was first elected in 2019.

Virginia's 91st House of Delegates district, 2021
| Party | Candidate | Votes | % |
|---|---|---|---|
| Republican | A.C. Cordoza | 13,741 | 49.4 |
| Democratic | Martha Mugler (incumbent) | 13,647 | 49.0 |
| Libertarian | Charles West | 417 | 1.5 |
| Write-in | | 31 | 0.1 |
| Total votes | | 27,836 | 100.0 |
| Republican gain from Democratic | | | |

Martha Mugler
- Barack Obama, 44th president of the United States (2009–2017), United States Senator from Illinois (2005–2008)

=== District 92 ===
Incumbent Democrat Jeion Ward was first elected in 2019.

Virginia's 92nd House of Delegates district, 2021
| Party | Candidate | Votes | % |
|---|---|---|---|
| Democratic | Jeion Ward (incumbent) | 19,235 | 73.7 |
| Republican | Benjamin Siff | 6,787 | 26.0 |
| Write-in | | 64 | 0.3 |
| Total votes | | 26,086 | 100.0 |
| Democratic hold | | | |

=== District 93 ===
Incumbent Democrat Michael Mullin was first elected in a 2016 special election.

Virginia's 93rd House of Delegates district, 2021
| Party | Candidate | Votes | % |
|---|---|---|---|
| Democratic | Michael Mullin (incumbent) | 17,048 | 51.6 |
| Republican | Jordan Gray | 15,968 | 48.3 |
| Write-in | | 40 | 0.1 |
| Total votes | | 33,056 | 100.0 |
| Democratic hold | | | |

Michael P. Mullin
- Barack Obama, 44th president of the United States (2009–2017), United States Senator from Illinois (2005–2008)

=== District 94 ===
Incumbent Democrat Shelly Simonds was first elected in 2019.

Virginia's 94th House of Delegates district, 2021
| Party | Candidate | Votes | % |
|---|---|---|---|
| Democratic | Shelly Simonds (incumbent) | 13,725 | 56.0 |
| Republican | Russ Harper | 10,734 | 43.8 |
| Write-in | | 54 | 0.2 |
| Total votes | | 24,513 | 100.0 |
| Democratic hold | | | |

Shelly Simonds
- Barack Obama, 44th president of the United States (2009–2017), United States Senator from Illinois (2005–2008)

=== District 95 ===
Incumbent Democrat Cia Price was first elected in 2015.

Virginia's 95th House of Delegates district, 2021
| Party | Candidate | Votes | % |
|---|---|---|---|
| Democratic | Cia Price (incumbent) | 13,633 | 63.5 |
| Republican | David Wilson | 7,789 | 36.3 |
| Write-in | | 48 | 0.2 |
| Total votes | | 21,470 | 100.0 |
| Democratic hold | | | |

=== District 96 ===
Incumbent Republican Amanda Batten was first elected in 2019.

Virginia's 96th House of Delegates district, 2021
| Party | Candidate | Votes | % |
|---|---|---|---|
| Republican | Amanda Batten (incumbent) | 25,431 | 55.7 |
| Democratic | Mark Downey | 20,146 | 44.2 |
| Write-in | | 52 | 0.1 |
| Total votes | | 45,629 | 100.0 |
| Republican hold | | | |

=== District 97 ===
Incumbent Republican Scott Wyatt was first elected in 2019.

Virginia's 97th House of Delegates district, 2021
| Party | Candidate | Votes | % |
|---|---|---|---|
| Republican | Scott Wyatt (incumbent) | 33,994 | 72.4 |
| Democratic | Stan Scott | 12,819 | 27.3 |
| Write-in | | 147 | 0.3 |
| Total votes | | 46,960 | 100.0 |
| Republican hold | | | |

=== District 98 ===
Incumbent Republican Keith Hodges was first elected in 2011.

Virginia's 98th House of Delegates district, 2021
| Party | Candidate | Votes | % |
|---|---|---|---|
| Republican | Keith Hodges (incumbent) | 27,056 | 71.9 |
| Democratic | Ella Webster | 10,520 | 28.0 |
| Write-in | | 45 | 0.1 |
| Total votes | | 37,621 | 100.0 |
| Republican hold | | | |

=== District 99 ===
Incumbent Republican Margaret Ransone was first elected in 2011.

Democratic primary results
| Party | Candidate | Votes | % |
|---|---|---|---|
| Democratic | Linwood Blizzard | 2,714 | 73.29 |
| Democratic | Jolicia Ward | 667 | 18.01 |
| Democratic | Zach Filtz | 322 | 8.7 |
| Total votes | | 3,703 | 100.0 |

Virginia's 99th House of Delegates district, 2021
| Party | Candidate | Votes | % |
|---|---|---|---|
| Republican | Margaret Ransone (incumbent) | 23,780 | 65.4 |
| Democratic | Linwood Blizzard | 12,558 | 34.5 |
| Write-in | | 35 | 0.1 |
| Total votes | | 36,373 | 100.0 |
| Republican hold | | | |

=== District 100 ===
Incumbent Republican Robert Bloxom Jr. was first elected in 2014.

Virginia's 100th House of Delegates district, 2021
| Party | Candidate | Votes | % |
|---|---|---|---|
| Republican | Robert Bloxom Jr. (incumbent) | 15,408 | 56.5 |
| Democratic | Finale Norton | 11,829 | 43.4 |
| Write-in | | 35 | 0.1 |
| Total votes | | 27,272 | 100.0 |
| Republican hold | | | |

Finale Norton
- Barack Obama, 44th president of the United States (2009–2017), United States Senator from Illinois (2005–2008)

== See also ==
- 2021 Virginia gubernatorial election
- 2021 Virginia lieutenant gubernatorial election
- 2021 Virginia Attorney General election
- List of Virginia state legislatures
