= State Navigate =

American political website

- Former name: CNalysis
- Website type: Politics
- Available in: English
- Creator: Chaz Nuttycombe
- Website: statenavigate.org
- Launched: 2020; 6 years ago
- Current status: Online

State Navigate, originally rendered as CNalysis, is an American political website and nonpartisan 501(c)(3) nonprofit organization that specializes in state governments.

== Background ==
=== 2024 ===
A June 2024 article announced that CNalysis planned to move operations to State Navigate in December 2024, following the 2024 United States elections. In addition to forecasting state legislative election outcomes and calculating, gathering and publishing related election data for them, State Navigate announced it plans to conduct polling on the state legislative level, curate news in state legislatures, hire state house reporters, calculate the ideology of legislators, and display comprehensive bill and campaign finance databases.

=== 2025 ===
On April 3, 2025, State Navigate launched its first subsidiary website, South Carolina Navigate. South Carolina Navigate launched with two features, including electoral and demographics summaries of each state's legislative districts and an aggregated news service. On May 9, 2025, the website added more candidate campaign data, including links to each candidate's website and social media, and lists of every donation received and expenditure made by a campaign. On May 24, 2025, State Navigate launched operations in Virginia. In August, State Navigate launched in Utah. In October, State Navigate launched in Wisconsin and West Virginia.

State Navigate conducted its first-ever polling for statewide and state legislative elections in October 2025. It conducted two statewide polls in Virginia and, out of the pollsters that asked voters about the races for Governor, Lieutenant Governor, and Attorney General, was the most accurate in the country. Of the pollsters that at least asked about the race for Virginia Governor, State Navigate was the second-most accurate.

In their final forecasts in 2025, Democrats overperformed. In the Virginia elections, they had Abigail Spanberger holding an 11.2% lead in the race for Governor, Ghazala Hashmi with a 6.4% lead in the race for Lieutenant Governor, and Jay Jones with a 2.1% lead in the race for Attorney General, and Democrats favored to win 60 seats in the House of Delegates. Spanberger won by 15.2%, Hashmi won by 11.4%, Jones won by 6.7%, and Democrats won 64 seats in the House of Delegates. In the New Jersey elections, they had Mikie Sherrill with a 6.1% lead in their final forecast, and Democrats favored to win 51 seats in the General Assembly. In actuality, Sherrill would win by 13.9% and Democrats would expand their majority to 57 seats.

== CNalysis ==
=== 2020 ===
CNalysis launched on March 1, 2020, after beginning development in October 2019. Nuttycombe was joined with its original staff: cofounder "cinyc9," Nuttycombe's Geographic information system tutor, as well as editor Allie Geier, oddsmaker Jackson Martin, and graphics designer Blaine Monroe. In July, campaign finance analyst Chris Leonchik was brought on board. In December, jhkforecasts founder Jack Kersting joined the team as the co-forecaster.

CNalysis successfully predicted a Joe Biden victory as well as 47/50 states for the Presidential election that year. They unsuccessfully predicted that Joe Biden would win the states of Texas, North Carolina, and Florida, all of which were rated "Tilt Democratic," representing a 60% chance Biden would win those states. All 3 states were instead won by Donald Trump. In the Senate, they successfully predicted a Democratic majority in the Senate, while missing 4/35 seats, unsuccessfully predicting Democratic victories in North Carolina and Maine, and Republican victories in the Georgia runoffs. In the US House, they missed 25 out of the 435 seats in the chamber. In the 11 gubernatorial elections, they successfully predicted every race.

In the state legislative elections that year, they correctly predicted 78/86 state legislative chambers, missing the Texas House, Michigan House, Iowa House, Minnesota Senate, as well as both chambers in the Arizona and New Hampshire legislature, where Republicans won majorities in each. They successfully predicted the outcome of 3,285 contested state legislative seats out of the 3,545 seats they cast a rating for (93%). Out of the 1,033 seats they identified as competitive (including 15 seats that were in their "Safe" column the other way), they successfully predicted 773 seats, or 75%.

=== 2021 ===
On its first anniversary, CNalysis debuted its new logo, and launched a newsletter and a podcast.

CNalysis was the first forecasting outlet to post a prediction that had Glenn Youngkin as the favorite to win the Virginia Governor's race, giving Youngkin a "Tilt R" rating, representing a 60% chance of victory. They unsuccessfully predicted Democratic victories in the races for Virginia Lieutenant Governor and Virginia Attorney General, giving Democrats a 60% chance of winning the Lieutenant Governor's race and a 70% chance of winning the Attorney General race. They also successfully predicted the race for New Jersey Governor, expecting a Phil Murphy victory.

In the state legislative elections, they successfully predicted the outcome of 123 out of 129 contested state legislative seats between the Virginia House of Delegates and the New Jersey Senate. They successfully predicted that Republicans would flip the Virginia House of Delegates with a 52–48 majority, but missed 4/100 seats in the chamber, with both parties pulling off an upset in two each. In the New Jersey Senate, they successfully predicted a Democratic majority while missing 2 seats in the chamber.

=== 2022 ===
In 2022, CNalysis had the best US House forecast compared to any other outlet that eliminates Toss-Up ratings, missing 16/435 seats and predicting a 230-205 Republican House. In the US Senate, they successfully predicted 34/36 seats, incorrectly predicting Republican victories in Nevada and Pennsylvania. They successfully predicted 32/36 gubernatorial elections that year, incorrectly predicting Republican victories in Oregon, Kansas, Arizona, and Wisconsin.

In their state legislative forecasts, they successfully predicted 83 out of 88 state legislative chambers up that year, incorrectly predicting Republican victories in the Pennsylvania House as well as both chambers of the Michigan and Minnesota legislature. They successfully predicted the outcome of 3,380 contested state legislative seats out of the 3,569 seats they cast a rating for (95%). Out of the 1,284 seats they identified as competitive (including 3 seats that were in their "Safe" column the other way), they successfully predicted 1,095 seats, or 85%.

=== 2023 ===
CNalysis earned recognition in 2023 for correctly predicting all 100 results in the 2023 Virginia House of Delegates election and all 40 results in the 2023 Virginia Senate election. On election night, the website debuted a new feature built by Kersting: a live projection of who is favored to win control of the Virginia legislature as precinct results rolled in.

They successfully predicted the outcome of the gubernatorial elections in Mississippi, Louisiana and Kentucky that year, as well as 277 out of 284 contested state legislative seats (98% correct) between the states of Virginia, New Jersey, Mississippi, and Louisiana. When filtering by the 63 seats they identified as competitive in these states, or 89% of seats right.

=== 2024 ===
Nuttycombe and co-forecaster Jack Kersting completed college in May 2024.

For the 2024 United States presidential election, CNalysis incorrectly predicted that Kamala Harris would win by roughly 308 electoral votes with a 70% chance of victory. They forecasted a 60% chance of a Democratic victory in Nevada and North Carolina (tilting Democratic), a 70% chance in Pennsylvania and Wisconsin (leaning Democratic), and an 80% chance in Georgia and Michigan (likely Democratic). All 6 states were instead won by Donald Trump. They also incorrectly predicted a Democratic victory in the 2024 United States House of Representatives elections, however, they missed 10 out of 435 US House seats, their best score out of their three US House forecasts. In the US Senate, they only missed one out of 34 seats up that year and successfully predicted a Republican majority. Like in 2020, they successfully predicted the outcome of each of the 11 gubernatorial races up in presidential years.

In their state legislative forecasts, they successfully predicted 79 out of 85 state legislative chambers up that year, incorrectly predicting Democratic victories in the Wisconsin Assembly, Michigan House, Minnesota House, New Hampshire House, and both chambers of the Arizona legislature. They successfully predicted the outcome of 3,633 contested state legislative seats out of the 3,879 seats they cast a rating for (94%). Out of the 1,147 seats they identified as competitive (including 3 seats that were in their "Safe" column the other way), they successfully predicted 901 seats, or 79%.

On December 20, 2024, the CNalysis website shut down and redirects to its successor, State Navigate. The website had a staff of seven as well as two interns.
