= Tim Anderson (Virginia politician) =

American politician from Virginia

Member of the Virginia House of Delegates from the 83rd district
- In office January 12, 2022 – April 3, 2023
- Preceded by: Nancy Guy
- Succeeded by: Otto Wachsmann (redistricting)

Personal details
- Party: Republican

Tim Anderson is an American politician. A Republican, he is a former member of the Virginia House of Delegates, representing the 83rd district after defeating Nancy Guy in 2021. He resigned on April 3, 2023, to run for election to the Virginia Senate's 19th district. With 97% of the votes tallied, AP reported Christie New Craig defeating Anderson 4,565 votes (37.8%) to 3,937 votes and Jeff Bruzesi at 3,575 votes.

In 2022, Anderson filed an unsuccessful lawsuit attempting to prevent bookstores from selling two books, A Court of Mist and Fury by Sarah J. Maas and Gender Queer by Maia Kobabe, to anyone under 16 years of age. He believed they violated state obscenity laws due to their pornographic depictions.

In the 2025 Virginia House of Delegates election, Anderson was the Republican candidate in District 97 but was defeated by Democrat Michael Feggans.

== Personal life ==
Anderson is a practicing attorney and owner of a gun store. He is married and has three children.
