= Joseph Bouchard =

United States Navy captain (born 1954)

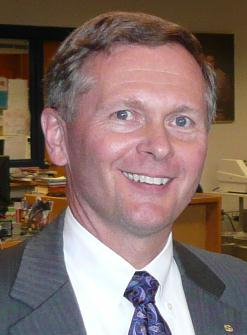
- Joseph F. Bouchard, August 20, 2008

Member of the Virginia House of Delegates from the 83rd district
- In office January 9, 2008 – January 13, 2010
- Preceded by: Leo Wardrup
- Succeeded by: Chris Stolle

Personal details
- Born: July 17, 1954 (age 72) Pensacola, Florida
- Education: United States Naval Academy, Naval Postgraduate School, Stanford University
- Occupation: All hazards emergency planning consultant
- Profession: Naval officer
- Awards: Presidential Service Badge, Defense Distinguished Service Medal, Legion of Merit (3 awards)

Military service
- Branch/service: United States Navy
- Years of service: 1976–2003
- Rank: Captain
- Commands: USS Oldendorf (DD-972); Naval Station Norfolk

Joseph F. Bouchard (born July 17, 1954) is a former United States Navy captain who retired in 2003 after 27 years on active duty. He commanded the destroyer USS Oldendorf and Naval Station Norfolk, the world's largest naval base.

== Education ==
Bouchard graduated with distinction from the United States Naval Academy, where he majored in international security affairs and studied Chinese and Japanese. He earned a Master of Arts degree in national security affairs from the U.S. Naval Postgraduate School and a Doctor of Philosophy in political science (international relations and strategic studies) from Stanford University. He also is a graduate of:

- U.S. Institute of Peace, International Conflict Resolution Skills Training Program, April 1995
- Massachusetts Institute of Technology, Seminar XXI Program on Foreign Politics, International Relations, and the National Interest, May 1996
- Maritime Institute of Technology and Graduate Studies, Port, Company and Ship Security Officer Program

== Career ==
Bouchard was a specialist in strategic and operational planning, including assignments as branch head, Strategy and Concepts Branch, Office of the Chief of Naval Operations; deputy senior director for defense policy and arms control, National Security Council, The White House; and deputy director, Navy Operations Group (Deep Blue), which was responsible for planning the navy's role in the war on terror. At the National Security Council, he was principal author of the National Security Strategy, 1997–1999. He received numerous personal decorations, including the Defense Distinguished Service Medal, the highest non-combat award in the US military.

Bouchard's US Navy assignments included:

- February 2003 – September 2003: Director, Navy Reconstitution Group, Office of the Chief of Naval Operations, the Pentagon. Additional responsibility as strategic analyst, Deep Blue (Naval Operations Group), Office of the Chief of Naval Operations, The Pentagon. Deep Blue was responsible for planning the Navy's role in the war on terrorism.
- February 2000 – January 2003: Commanding officer, Naval Station Norfolk, Virginia; program manager, regional port operations, Navy Region Mid-Atlantic; chair, Port Operations Integrated Product Team (Navy-wide team sponsored by CNO's staff to enhance management and cost-effectiveness of port operations).
- January 1997 – January 2000: Deputy senior director for arms control and defense policy, director for defense policy, National Security Council, the White House.
- March 1995 – February 1997: Branch head, Strategy and Concepts Branch (N513), Office of the Chief of Naval Operations, the Pentagon.
- April 1993 – February 1995: Commanding officer, USS Oldendorf (DD-972), home ported in San Diego, California. Deployed to the Persian Gulf and Western Pacific, January–July 1994. Earned several awards for operational excellence and the “Golden Anchor” award for excellence in personnel management and retention.
- May 1990 – July 1992: Special assistant and deputy executive assistant to commander in chief, Allied Forces Southern Europe and commander in chief, U.S. Naval Forces Europe.
- September 1988 – April 1990: Executive officer, USS Paul F. Foster (DD-964), home ported in Long Beach, California.
- November 1985 – September 1987: Commander, Destroyer Squadron Twenty One Staff, homeported in San Diego, California. Material officer, ASW commander watch officer.
- April 1984 – October 1985: USS O'Brien (DD 975), home ported in San Diego, California. Engineering officer, tactical action officer.
- February 1977 – February 1980: USS Lockwood (FF-1064), home ported in Yokosuka, Japan. Antisubmarine warfare officer and nuclear weapons officer.

Bouchard is heavily involved in state, regional and local activities in the areas of national security, adaptation to sea level rise and economic development. He has served on the Secure and Resilient Commonwealth Panel, which advises the governor on homeland security and emergency preparedness, since 2007. He serves on the board of directors of the Virginia Maritime Association and is a member of the advisory committee for the Maritime Institute at Old Dominion University. He has made scores of presentations at international, national and regional conferences, and is a frequent commentator on radio and television on naval matters, national security and sea level rise.

Bouchard also is recognized as an expert on the economic and national security aspects of environmental and climate change policy. He served on the Virginia Beach Alternative Energy Task Force, 2009–2010, and in 2008 served on the Governor's Commission on Climate Change and chaired its Adaptation Working Group. He founded the Hampton Roads Sea Level Rise Preparedness and Resilience Intergovernmental Planning Pilot Project, April 2014 – July 2016, drafting the charter for the pilot project, including its mission, organizational structure, deliverables and timeline, assisting with planning of pilot project events, and assisting with identifying persons to serve on the various working groups and advisory committees.

While representing Virginia Beach in the Virginia House of Delegates in 2008–2009, Bouchard served on the Finance Committee, Science and Technology Committee, and the Agriculture, Chesapeake and Natural Resources Committee. He was the only member of the General Assembly who had commanded a military base in Virginia.

Bouchard is the senior judge advisor for FIRST Tech Challenge in Virginia and a judge and judge advisor the FIRST Robotics Competition Chesapeake Division. He has been involved with FIRST for over ten years.

== Awards ==
Bouchard is the author of Command in Crisis and numerous articles on defense, naval and homeland security matters, and has won two awards for his naval history writings:

- Captain Hugh Nott Memorial Award for exceptional articles published in the Naval War College Review in 1988, for "Accidents and Crises: Panay, Liberty, and Stark," Naval War College Review, Vol. 41, No. 4, Autumn 1988, pp. 87 102.
- Rear Admiral Ernest M. Eller Prize in Naval History, 1999, best article on naval history. Awarded jointly by the Naval Historical Center and Naval Historical Foundation for "Guarding the Cold War Ramparts: The U.S. Navy's Role in Continental Air Defense," Naval War College Review, Vol. 52, No. 3, Summer 1999.

Bouchard won numerous awards while on active duty:

- Authorized to wear the Presidential Service Badge
- Designated Joint Staff Officer
- Sub-specialist in Politico-Military Strategic Planning, National Security Affairs – Far East, Southeast Asia and Pacific, and National Security Affairs – Western Europe
- Awarded Defense Distinguished Service Medal (the highest non-combat award in the Armed Services), Legion of Merit (three awards), Defense Meritorious Service Medal, Meritorious Service Medal (two awards), Navy Commendation Medal (three awards), Meritorious Unit Commendation (two awards), National Defense Medal (three awards), Southwest Asia Service Medal, Humanitarian Service Medal, Sea Service Ribbon (six awards), and Overseas Service Ribbon (two awards).
- Awarded Junior Officer Shiphandling Award in 1980
- He has received a number of other personal awards as well:
- Virginia General Assembly, Resolution of Appreciation, 2001, for care and services provided to the crew and families of USS Cole after it was attacked in October 2000
- Commonwealth of Virginia Board of Education, Resolution of Appreciation for membership in the Leadership Development Committee, August 27, 2001
- Hampton Roads Maritime Association, 2002 Port Champion Award, April 3, 2002
- Secretary of Defense 2002 Annual Antiterrorism Award, Best Antiterrorism/Force Protection Innovation or Action, First Honorable Mention, for Port Security in Hampton Roads
- U.S. Secretary of Transportation, 2002 Partnering for Excellence Award for Port Security in Hampton Roads, January 2003
- Hampton Roads Maritime Association, Resolution of Appreciation, January 16, 2003
- Virginia Port Authority, Medal of Excellence, February 28, 2003

Bouchard is widely recognized as an expert on national defense and homeland security, and has received several awards for his leadership in port security, including the Secretary of Defense 2002 Annual Antiterrorism Award, Secretary of Transportation 2002 Partnering for Excellence Award, Virginia Port Authority Medal of Excellence, and the Virginia Maritime Association Port Champion Award.
