= Paul Councill =

American politician (1921– 2007)

Member of the Virginia House of Delegates
- In office January 9, 1974 – January 11, 2006
- Preceded by: Sam Pope
- Succeeded by: Roslyn Tyler
- Constituency: 44th district (1974‍–‍1982); 41st district (1982‍–‍1983); 75th district (1983‍–‍2006)

Personal details
- Born: James Paul Councill Jr. December 12, 1921 Norfolk, Virginia, U.S.
- Died: March 25, 2007 (aged 85) Franklin, Virginia, U.S.
- Party: Democratic
- Spouses: Patricia Jean Marble; Genie Marks

Military service
- Branch/service: United States Army; Army Air Forces
- Battles/wars: World War II; Pacific theater

James Paul Councill Jr. (December 12, 1921 – March 25, 2007) was an American politician.
