= Leo Wardrup =

American politician (1936–2014)

Member of the Virginia House of Delegates from the 83rd district
- In office January 8, 1992 – January 9, 2008
- Preceded by: Billy O'Brien
- Succeeded by: Joseph Bouchard

Personal details
- Born: Leo Clyde Wardrup Jr. September 5, 1936 Middlesboro, Kentucky, U.S.
- Died: July 2, 2014 (aged 77) Virginia Beach, Virginia, U.S.
- Party: Republican
- Spouse: Gloria Anne Wirth
- Education: University of North Carolina at Chapel Hill (BA); George Washington University (MBA); Naval War College (MS)

Military service
- Allegiance: United States
- Branch/service: United States Navy
- Years of service: 1958–1986
- Rank: Captain
- Battles/wars: Vietnam War
- Awards: Meritorious Service Medal

Leo Clyde Wardrup Jr. (September 5, 1936 – July 2, 2014) was an American naval officer and politician.

Born in Middlesboro, Kentucky, Wardrup received his bachelor's degree from University of North Carolina at Chapel Hill and his master's degrees from George Washington University and Naval War College. Wardrup was a captain in the United States Navy from 1958 to 1986. He lived in Virginia Beach, Virginia. He served in the Virginia House of Delegates, as a Republican from 1992 until 2007.
