= Virginia's 75th House of Delegates district =

Virginia legislative district

Virginia's 75th State House of Delegates district
Delegate
Lindsey Dougherty; D
- Demographics: 41.4% White; 53.5% Black; 2.4% Hispanic; 0.5% Asian; 0.3% Other
- Population (2010): 76,696

Virginia's 75th House of Delegates district elects one of 100 seats in the Virginia House of Delegates, the lower house of the state's bicameral legislature. District 75 represents Hopewell, as well as parts of the counties of Chesterfield and Prince George. The seat is currently held by Democrat Lindsey Dougherty, who defeated Republican Carrie Coyner in 2025.

== District officeholders ==
Years	Delegate	Party	Electoral history
January 12, 1983 – January 11, 2006	Paul Councill	Democratic	Retired
January 11, 2006 – January 12, 2022	Roslyn Tyler	Democratic	First elected in 2005; Lost re-election
January 12, 2022 – 2024	Otto Wachsmann	Republican	First elected in 2021 Redistricted to the 83rd district
January 12, 2024 – January 14, 2026	Carrie Coyner	Republican	First elected in 2023 Redistricted from 62nd district Lost re-election
January 14, 2026 – present	Lindsey Dougherty	Democratic	First elected in 2025
