= Otto Wachsmann =

American politician from Virginia

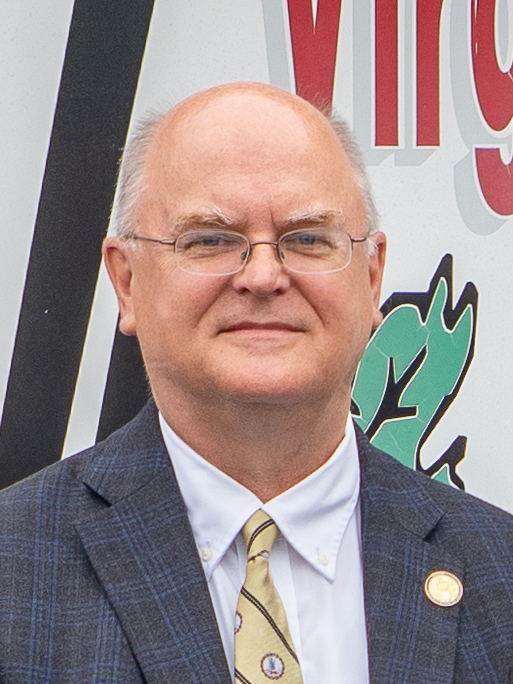
- Wachsmann in 2025

Member of the Virginia House of Delegates
- Incumbent
- Assumed office January 12, 2022
- Preceded by: Roslyn Tyler
- Constituency: 75th district (2022–2024); 83rd district (2024–present)

Personal details
- Party: Republican
- Spouse: Judy Wachsmann
- Children: 2
- Education: Virginia Commonwealth University (BS)

H. Otto Wachsmann Jr. is an American politician and pharmacist who is a member of the Virginia House of Delegates for the 83rd district. Elected in November 2021, he assumed office on January 12, 2022.

== Education ==
Wachsmann attended the College of William & Mary for two years and earned a Bachelor of Science degree in pharmacy from the VCU School of Pharmacy.

== Career ==
Wachsmann worked as a pharmacist for Peoples Drug before working for several independent pharmacies. Wachsmann later worked as an office manager at the A. H. Robins Company. He later worked as a manager at the company. In 1996, Wachsmann took an administrative role at the Bernard J. Dunn School of Pharmacy of Shenandoah University. He returned to Stony Creek, Virginia in 2003 to take over his father's pharmacy. He was elected to the Virginia House of Delegates 75th district in November 2021 and assumed office on January 1, 2022. Due to redistricting, Wachsmann’s district became the 83rd district. In 2023, Wachsmann was re-elected.

== Personal life ==
Wachsmann and his wife, Judy, have two daughters.
