= Nancy Guy =

Virginia house of representatives member

Member of the Virginia House of Delegates from the 83rd district
- In office January 8, 2020 – January 12, 2022
- Preceded by: Chris Stolle
- Succeeded by: Tim Anderson

Personal details
- Party: Democratic
- Spouse: Richard Guy
- Website: https://guyfordelegate.com/

Nancy Guy is an American politician. A Democrat, she was a member of the Virginia House of Delegates, representing the 83rd district.

== Biography ==
A native of the 83rd district, Guy received an undergraduate degree from the College of William & Mary, and a Juris Doctor degree from the University of Virginia.

After living in Charlotte, North Carolina, Guy and her family returned to Virginia Beach where she served on the school board and managed a real estate partnership. Following a battle with breast cancer, Guy decided to focus on her family and beliefs, and closed her partnership.

Guy is engaged in her local church and has held a number of posts in education at both the local and state levels.

== Political career ==
=== 2019 ===
In the 2019 Virginia House of Delegates election, Guy challenged incumbent Republican Chris Stolle. She was unopposed in the primaries.

Guy defeated Stolle by a slim margin, and the official recount concluded she had won with 41 votes. Before the recount, Guy had obtained 49.97% of the vote.

=== 2021 ===
Guy was defeated for reelection by Republican Tim Anderson in the 2021 election, who received 51% of the vote.
