= Chris Stolle =

American politician (born 1958)

Member of the Virginia House of Delegates from the 83rd district
- In office January 13, 2010 – January 8, 2020
- Preceded by: Joseph Bouchard
- Succeeded by: Nancy Guy

Personal details
- Born: Christopher Patrick Stolle; April 1, 1958 (age 68) Norfolk, Virginia, U.S.
- Party: Republican
- Spouse: Lisa Karen Graham
- Education: United States Naval Academy, College of William and Mary
- Profession: Physician
- Committees: Health Welfare and Institutions, Education, Counties Cities and Towns

Christopher Patrick Stolle (born April 1, 1958) is a former member of the Virginia House of Delegates representing 83rd district, which includes portions of the cities of Virginia Beach and Norfolk. A Republican, he first won election in 2009 by defeating Democratic incumbent Joseph Bouchard by an eighteen-point margin. He took the oath of office on January 13, 2010, in Richmond, Virginia. Del. Stolle was re-elected on Nov. 9, 2011, securing almost 97% of all votes. Del. Stolle is an OB/GYN and Vice President of Medical Affairs at Riverside Regional Medical Center. He is the brother of Virginia Beach Sheriff and former State Senator Ken Stolle and state senator Siobhan Dunnavant. He lost re-election to Democrat Nancy Guy in 2019.
