= Roslyn Tyler =

American politician (born 1961)

Roz Tyler

Member of the Virginia House of Delegates from the 75th district
- In office January 11, 2006 – January 12, 2022
- Preceded by: Paul Councill
- Succeeded by: Otto Wachsmann

Personal details
- Born: Roslyn M. Cain; July 18, 1961 (age 65) Greensville County, Virginia
- Party: Democratic
- Spouse(s): Rufus Edmond Tyler, Sr.
- Children: Rufus Jr., Ronecia, Rosché, Rameka
- Education: Virginia State University; Old Dominion University; Virginia Commonwealth University
- Profession: Physical therapist
- Committees: Education; Agriculture Chesapeake and Natural Resources; Appropriations
- Website: www.delegatetyler.com

Roslyn C. "Roz" Tyler (née Cain; born July 18, 1961, in Greensville County, Virginia) is an American politician of the Democratic Party. Since 2006 she has been a member of the Virginia House of Delegates. From 2006 to 2022, she represented the 75th district in Southside Virginia, made up of three counties and parts of four others, plus the city of Emporia and part of the city of Franklin.

During the 2019 legislative session, 67% of the House bills introduced by Tyler were signed into law.

== Early life and education ==
Tyler was born in Emporia, Virginia and is a graduate of Greensville County High School. Tyler holds Bachelors of Science degrees in Biology and Physical Therapy from Virginia State University and Old Dominion University. She also holds a Masters of Science in Education from Virginia State University.

== Political career ==
Tyler serves as the Chair of the Education Committee and as a member of the Agriculture Chesapeake and Natural Resources Committee, and Appropriations Committee. She was also a former member of the Sussex County Board of Supervisors.

The Virginia Education Association Fund for Children and Public Education has endorsed her because she has consistently voted for legislation supporting public education.

Tyler lost her re-election bid in 2021 to Republican pharmacist Otto Wachsmann, who had been her general election opponent in 2019.
