= Kathleen Murphy (politician) =

American politician (born 1948)

Member of the Virginia House of Delegates from the 34th district
- In office January 13, 2015 – January 10, 2024
- Preceded by: Barbara Comstock
- Succeeded by: Tony Wilt (redistricting)

Personal details
- Born: February 20, 1948 (age 78)
- Party: Democratic
- Spouse(s): John M. (Jack) Murphy, William E. Sudow
- Children: 6
- Education: American University
- Profession: consultant
- Committees: Finance; Privileges and Elections
- Website: www.murphyfordelegate.com HOD official website Twitter @kmurphyva Facebook Delegate Kathleen Murphy

Kathleen J. Murphy is a former American state representative from the Commonwealth of Virginia. Her district encompassed McLean, Great Falls, and parts of Vienna and Loudoun County.

Murphy first ran for the 34th district seat in the 2013 elections against incumbent Republican Barbara Comstock, but lost. When Comstock won election to the United States House of Representatives in 2014, Murphy ran in the special election to succeed Comstock in the House of Delegates. Murphy defeated Republican Craig Parisot to win the seat.

== Background ==
Murphy is the former president of Johnson Murphy & Associates, a consulting firm based in McLean that provides strategic counseling and builds legislative strategies for companies and non-profit organizations. Previously she worked as a senior advisor for International Trade issues at the Department of Commerce (2000-20001) and handled Congressional Affairs at USAID (1996-2000) during the Clinton administration.

She worked for Congressman Charlie Wilson (D-TX)(1993-1996) where she held a Top Secret security clearance and handled Defense and Foreign Operations appropriations.

She was a writer and producer at Nickelodeon and deputy director of women's outreach at the Democratic National Committee. Murphy helped found Salute Our Services, which helped connect service members deployed overseas with their families and Kids Serve Too, an organization to honor and support children in military families.

Murphy is currently a member of the Human Services Council for Fairfax County, the McLean Community Foundation, the Fairfax County Health Care Task Force and serves on a fundraising board for the Cystic Fibrosis Foundation. She is an active member of the Fairfax County Democratic Party and has worked as a Precinct leader for many years.

She graduated from American University, magna cum laude.

Murphy is the mother of 4 children and 2 step children. She and her husband, attorney Bill Sudow, are longtime McLean residents.

== Electoral history ==
=== 2013 campaign ===
In 2013, Murphy ran for the House of Delegates 34th district seat against incumbent Republican Barbara Comstock. She ran a competitive race and lost by less than 1% of the vote, despite being outspent by her Republican opponent more than two to one.

Results

Virginia House of Delegates election: 34th District, 2013
Party	Candidate	Votes	%
Democratic	Kathleen Murphy	14,540	49.21%
Republican	Barbara Comstock	14,962	50.64%
Write-ins		42	0.14%

=== 2015 special election ===
When Comstock was elected to the United States House of Representatives in 2014, Murphy ran in the special election to succeed Comstock in the Virginia House of Delegates. Murphy defeated Republican Craig Parisot to win the seat.

Results

Virginia House of Delegates election: 34th District, 2015
Party	Candidate	Votes	%
Democratic	Kathleen Murphy	6,419	51.23%
Republican	Craig A. Parisot	6,093	48.63%
Write-ins		16	0.12%

=== 2017 general election ===
Murphy won re-election in 2017, a banner year for Democrats in the House of Delegates. She outspent her Republican opponent more than six to one. Vinton Cerf contributed $10,000.

Results

Virginia House of Delegates election: 34th District, 2017
Party	Candidate	Votes	%
Democratic	Kathleen Murphy	20,522	60.92%
Republican	Cheryl Buford	13,146	39.02%
Write-ins		20	0.06%

=== 2019 general election ===
Murphy won re-election in 2019.

Results

Virginia House of Delegates election: 34th District, 2019
Party	Candidate	Votes	%
Democratic	Kathleen Murphy	17,143	58.35%
Republican	Gary Pan	12,213	41.57%
Write-ins		23	0.06%

=== 2021 general election ===
Murphy won re-election in 2021.

Results

Virginia House of Delegates election: 34th District, 2021
Party	Candidate	Votes	%
Democratic	Kathleen Murphy	23,093	57.07%
Republican	Gary Pan	17,327	42.82%
Write-ins		46	0.11%
