= Alfonso H. Lopez =

American politician

Alfonso Lopez
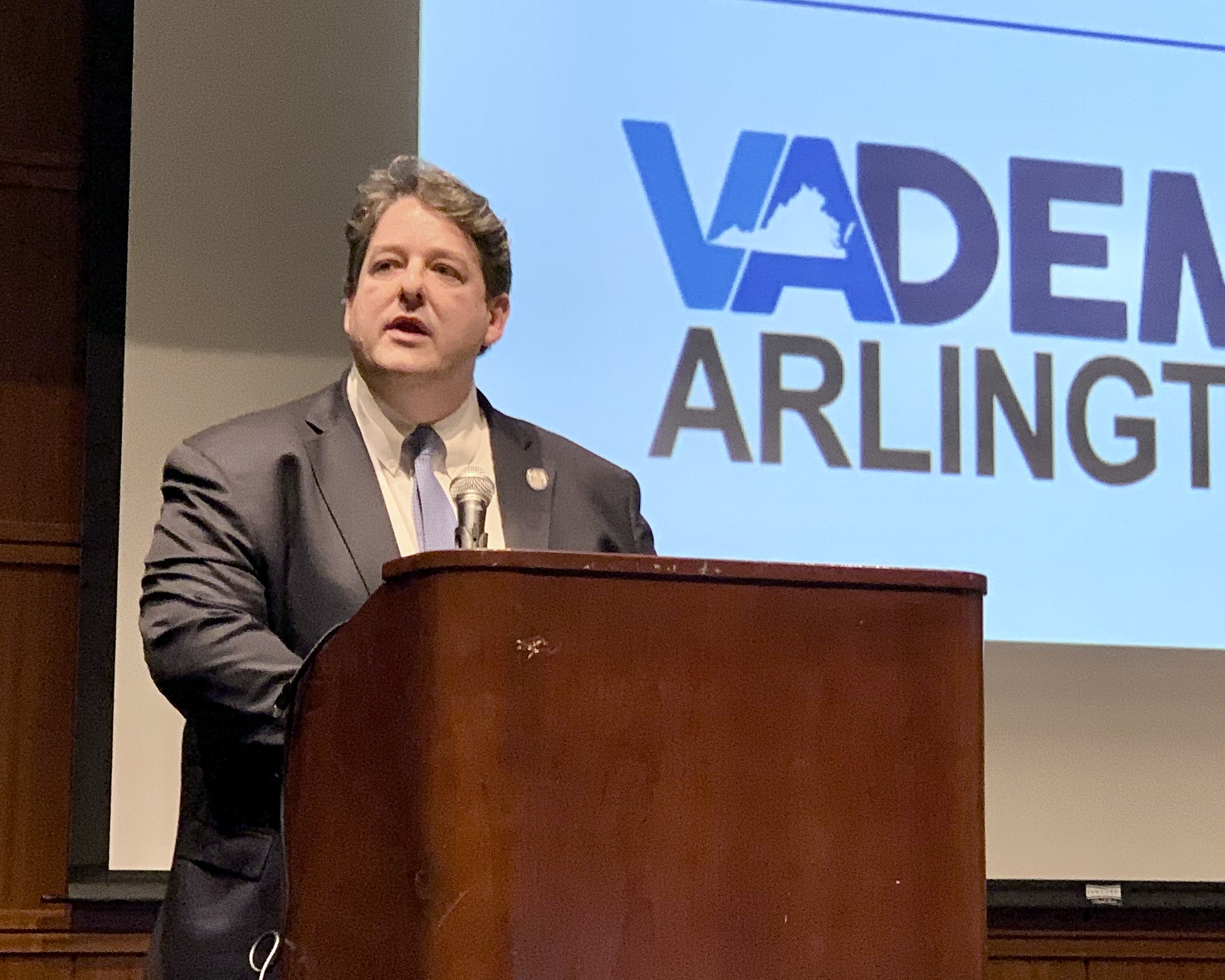

Member of the Virginia House of Delegates
- Incumbent
- Assumed office January 11, 2012
- Preceded by: Adam Ebbin
- Constituency: 49th district (2012–2024); 3rd district (2024–present)

Virginia House Democratic Whip
- In office January 2016 – April 2022 Serving with Mike Mullin

Personal details
- Born: July 28, 1970 (age 56) Williamsport, Pennsylvania, U.S.
- Party: Democratic
- Spouse: Sarah Zevin
- Children: 2
- Education: Vassar College (AB); Tulane University; (JD)
- Committees: Agriculture, Chesapeake, and Natural Resources; Labor and Commerce; Public Safety; Rules
- Website: Official website

Alfonso Hoffman Lopez (born July 28, 1970) is an American politician, former Obama administration official, and member of the Virginia House of Delegates. He has served in the House of Delegates since January 2012, currently represents the 3rd district, which includes parts of southern Arlington and Northern Alexandria City, in the suburbs of Washington, D.C.

Upon his election in 2011, Lopez became the first Latino Democrat to be elected to the Virginia General Assembly. He is a member of the Democratic Party, a former at-large member of the Democratic National Committee, and served as the Virginia House Democratic Whip from 2016 to 2022. In 2024, Lopez was appointed Chair of the Agriculture, Chesapeake, and Natural Resources Committee, making him the first Latino to chair a full committee in Virginia House of Delegates.

== Early life, family, and education ==
Alfonso Hoffman Lopez was born on July 28, 1970, in Williamsport, Pennsylvania, to Carole (née Hoffman) and Alfonso Chacón Lopez. His father, a former undocumented immigrant from Venezuela, came to the U.S. at the age of 19 and worked as a busboy before teaching himself English and working toward a management position with the Marriott Corporation. He is now retired. His mother, an American woman of Pennsylvania Dutch heritage, taught and counseled in the Arlington Public Schools system for thirty years before dying in 2008.

As a young child, Lopez's family traveled extensively, living in Liberia, Dominican Republic, Ecuador, and Venezuela, before settling in Northern Virginia. He attended Robinson Secondary School in Fairfax County, Virginia, graduating in 1988. He received an A.B. degree from Vassar College in 1992 and a J.D. from the Tulane University Law School in 1995. While in law school, he twice served as an intern in the Clinton administration, first in 1993 for the Domestic Policy Council and again in 1995 for the Council on Environmental Quality. Lopez credits the experience of interning at the White House for igniting his interest in politics and policy.

== Early career ==
After graduating from law school, Lopez worked on policy issues for Physicians for Social Responsibility, before joining the staff of Senator Robert G. Torricelli as a legislative assistant in 1999. He later worked as a lobbyist for the Arlington-based firm Alcalde & Fay, representing clients such as the city of Virginia Beach.

During this time, Lopez became active in Virginia politics. In 2004, he served as the president of the Arlington Young Democrats and helped found the Democratic Latino Organization of Virginia, the Latino caucus arm of the Democratic Party of Virginia, serving as its first president. That same year, he was named the “Virginia Young Democrat of the Year.” In 2005, after the election of Lt. Governor Tim Kaine as governor of Virginia, Lopez was appointed Deputy Policy Director for the governor-elect's transition team.

=== Kaine administration ===
In 2006, Lopez was named by Governor Kaine as the Director of the Virginia Liaison Office in Washington, D.C., a cabinet-level position responsible for directing and supervising congressional and federal relations for the Commonwealth of Virginia. In that role, Lopez also served as the Governor's representative to the National Governors Association, Democratic Governors Association and the Southern Governors Association.

=== Obama administration ===
In 2010, after the conclusion of Kaine's term as governor, Lopez joined the Obama administration as Assistant Administrator for Congressional and Legislative Affairs at the Small Business Administration (SBA). While at the SBA, he worked with Congress and Obama administration officials to pass the Small Business Jobs Act of 2010.

== Virginia House of Delegates ==
=== Elections ===
==== 2011 ====
In 2011, Virginia Delegate Adam Ebbin announced that he would not seek reelection to the House of Delegates in order to campaign for the Virginia Senate seat being vacated by retiring Senator Patsy Ticer. On May 4, Lopez announced his candidacy for the House of Delegates seat being vacated by Delegate Ebbin, representing Virginia's 49th district. He prevailed against opponent Stephanie Clifford with 66.07% of the vote in the Democratic primary on August 23 and ran unopposed in the general election.

==== 2013 ====
No Democratic primary was held in 2013 for the 49th district and Lopez was renominated without contest. Lopez faced Terry Modglin, the nominee of the Independent Green Party, in the general election held on November 5. Lopez won the general election with 77.98% of the vote.

==== 2014 ====
In February 2014, Lopez announced his candidacy for the U.S. House of Representatives seat being vacated by retiring Congressman Jim Moran. Lopez ended his candidacy the following April, before the Democratic primary.

==== 2015 ====
No Democratic primary was held in 2015 for the 49th district and Lopez was renominated without contest. Lopez faced no opposition in the general election held on November 3.

==== 2017 ====
No Democratic primary was held in 2017 for the 49th district and Lopez was renominated without contest. Lopez faced Republican candidate Adam Roosevelt in the general election held on November 7. Lopez won the general election with 81.30% of the vote.

==== 2019 ====
In January 2019, local activist and president of the Arlington Branch of the NAACP Julius "J.D." Spain announced his intention to challenge Lopez in the Democratic primary for election to the House of Delegates. In the primary held on June 11, Lopez carried every precinct in the district and won with 77.14% of the vote.

Lopez faced independent candidate Terry Modglin, who had previously run against Lopez in 2013 as the nominee of the Independent Green Party, in the general election held on November 5. Lopez won the general election with 83.29% of the vote.

==== 2021 ====
In October 2020, preschool teacher Karishma Mehta announced her intention to challenge Lopez in the 2021 Democratic primary to represent Virginia's 49th district. In the primary held on June 8, Lopez carried every precinct in the district and won with 70.50% of the vote.

In the general election on November 2, Lopez faced Republican candidate Timothy Kilcullin and independent candidate Terry Modglin, who had previously run against Lopez in 2013 and 2019. Lopez won the general election with 76.44% of the vote.

=== Committee assignments ===
Lopez currently serves on the following committees in the Virginia House of Delegates:

- Committee on Agriculture, Chesapeake, and Natural Resources (chair)
- Committee on Labor and Commerce
- Committee on Public Safety
- Committee on Communications, Technology, and Innovation

=== Caucuses and commissions ===
==== Caucuses ====
Lopez has remained active with caucus memberships, founding the Virginia Environment and Renewable Energy Caucus in 2015 with then-Senator Donald McEachin and Delegates David Bulova and Rip Sullivan. In 2018, following the elections of the first two Latina members of the Virginia General Assembly, Lopez founded the Virginia Latino Caucus with Delegates Hala Ayala, Elizabeth Guzman, Patrick Hope, and Jason Miyares—the first of its kind to represent Virginia's Latino population in the General Assembly.

==== Commissions ====
Appointed by Speaker of the House of Delegates, Lopez serves on the Commission on Coal and Energy, the Virginia Commission on Intergovernmental Cooperation, the Virginia Water Commission, and the Northern Virginia Transportation Commission. He formerly served as Chair of the Virginia Small Business Commission and as a member of the Interstate Commission on the Potomac River Basin, the Virginia Commission on Employee Retirement Security and Pension Reform, .

=== Tenure ===
Lopez was sworn in on January 11, 2012, as the delegate from Virginia's 49th district.

In the House of Delegates, Lopez has prioritized legislation focusing on environmental issues, immigrant rights, and small businesses. His first several years in the House of Delegates, Lopez pushed for legislation granting in-state tuition to undocumented immigrants who had grown up in the Commonwealth, modeling the legislation after the federal DREAM Act introduced in the U.S. Congress. In 2013, he passed legislation creating the Virginia Housing Trust Fund, which provides loans and grant funding for affordable housing projects in Virginia. In 2018, Lopez passed legislation extending a state tax credit for jobs created in the field of renewable energy.

In 2015, Delegate Lopez was selected to serve as the campaign chair and political director of the House Democratic Caucus. In 2016, he was appointed Whip of the House Democratic Caucus and currently serves in this position.

== Controversies and criticism ==
In late 2017, Lopez received criticism for performing work for ICA-Farmville, an immigrant detention facility in southern Virginia, during the later years of the Obama administration. Outside of his service in the House of Delegates—a part-time legislature—Lopez previously served as a partner at two consulting firms focused on business and government management. The employment for the ICA-Farmville facility was indicated on publicly released financial disclosures dating to 2014, 2015, and 2016. A collection of activists and student groups released a petition demanding Lopez sever any ties to the facility, apologize for his association with the facility, and pay reparations to the undocumented immigrants housed at the facility.

In lieu of responding to the demands or providing an explanation, Lopez released a statement highlighting his extensive pro-immigrant legislative record, as well as his leading role in fighting against conservative legislation to ban sanctuary cities and mandate local police compliance with detention requests from U.S. Immigration and Customs Enforcement. Several Virginia Latino community leaders and activists released statements expressing their support for Lopez.

The ICA-Farmville facility has not appeared on his public financial disclosures released since 2016. Since 2019, Lopez has worked as a senior corporate and government relations consultant for the Washington, D.C. office of the commercial law firm Becker & Poliakoff.

== Personal life ==
Lopez married Sarah Zevin in 2006. They have two sons, Aaron and Gabe. They live in Arlington, Virginia.

== Electoral history ==
Virginia House of Delegates, 49th district
Date	Election	Candidate	Party	Votes	%
Aug 23, 2011	Democratic primary	Alfonso H. Lopez		2,143	65.93
Aug 23, 2011	Democratic primary	Stephanie L. Clifford		1,107	34.06
Nov 8, 2011	General	Alfonso H. Lopez	Democratic	7,005	95.89
Nov 8, 2011	General	Write Ins		300	4.10
Nov 8, 2011	General	Adam Ebbin was elected to the Senate; seat stayed Democratic			
Nov 5, 2013	General	Alfonso H. Lopez	Democratic	13,087	77.98
Nov 5, 2013	General	Terry Modglin	Independent Green	3,505	20.88
Nov 3, 2015	General	Alfonso H. Lopez	Democratic	7,904	100
Nov 7, 2017	General	Alfonso H. Lopez	Democratic	19,308	81.30
Nov 7, 2017	General	Adam Roosevelt	Republican	4,391	18.49
Jun 11, 2019	Democratic primary	Alfonso H. Lopez		5,024	77.14
Jun 11, 2019	Democratic primary	J.D. Spain		1,489	22.86
Nov 5, 2019	General	Alfonso H. Lopez	Democratic	13,586	83.29
Nov 5, 2019	General	Terry Modglin	Independent	2,586	15.85
Jun 8, 2021	Democratic primary	Alfonso H. Lopez		4,936	70.50
Jun 8, 2021	Democratic primary	Karishma Mehta		2,065	29.50
Nov 2, 2021	General	Alfonso H. Lopez	Democratic	19,417	76.44
Nov 2, 2021	General	Timothy Kilcullin	Republican	4,946	19.47
Nov 2, 2021	General	Terry Modglin	Independent	985	3.88
Nov 7, 2023	General	Alfonso H. Lopez	Democratic	12,824	82.90
Nov 7, 2023	General	Major Mike Webb	Independent	2,509	16.22
Nov 7, 2023	General	Write-Ins		136	0.88
