= Virginia's 83rd House of Delegates district =

Virginia legislative district

District map from the 2023 election

Virginia's 83rd House of Delegates district elects one of 100 seats in the Virginia House of Delegates, the lower house of the state's bicameral legislature. District 83 includes parts of the cities of Norfolk and Virginia Beach. The district was most recently represented by Republican Tim Anderson.

== District officeholders ==
Years	Delegate	Party	Electoral history
January 12, 1983 – January 8, 1992	Billy O'Brien	Democratic	Retired
January 8, 1992 – January 9, 2008	Leo Wardrup	Republican	Retired
January 9, 2008 – January 13, 2010	Joseph Bouchard	Democratic	Defeated in bid for reelection
January 13, 2010 – January 8, 2020	Chris Stolle	Republican	Defeated in bid for reelection
January 8, 2020 – January 12, 2022	Nancy Guy	Democratic	Lost reelection bid
January 12, 2022 – April 3, 2023	Tim Anderson	Republican	Resigned to run for Virginia Senate
