= 2009 Virginia House of Delegates election =

2009 Virginia House of Delegates elections
- November 3, 2009

All 100 seats in the Virginia House of Delegates 51 seats needed for a majority
- Turnout: 40.4% ▲
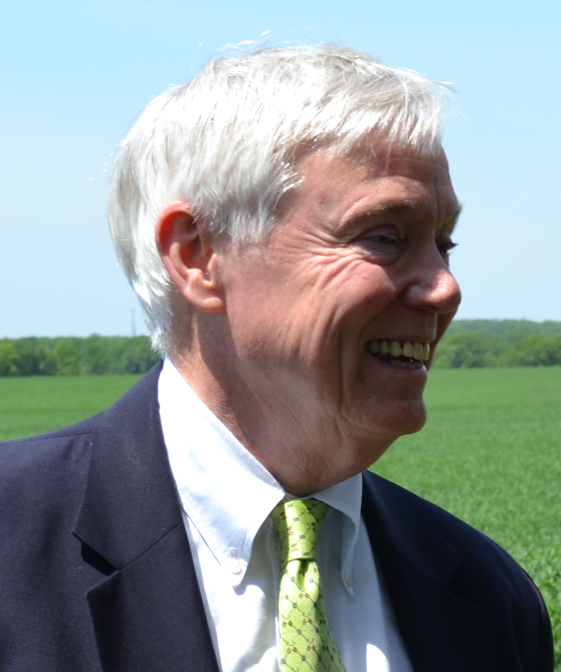

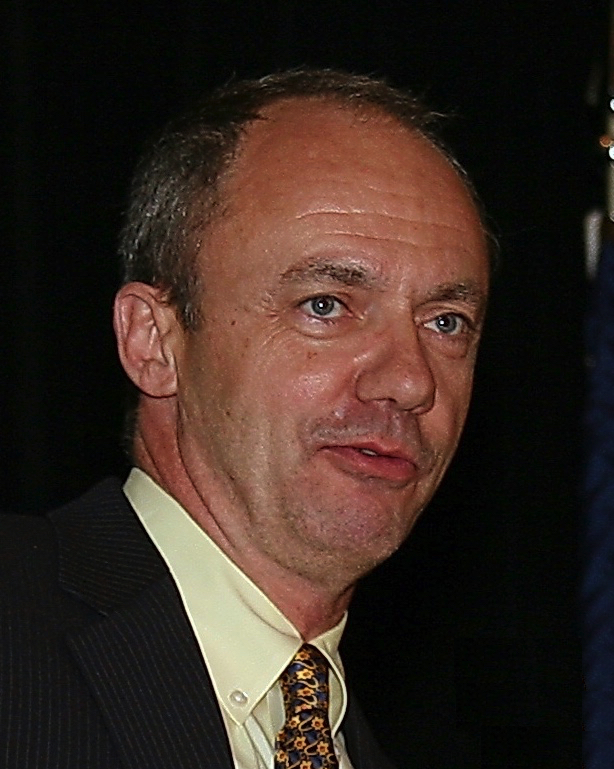
	Majority party	Minority party
Leader	Bill Howell	Ward Armstrong
Party	Republican	Democratic
Leader since	January 8, 2003	February 24, 2007
Leader's seat	28th	10th
Last election	54	44
Seats before	53	45
Seats won	59	39
Seat change	▲6	▼6
Popular vote	1,047,069	668,502
Percentage	56.8%	36.2%
Swing	▲5.8%	▼6.7%
- Results: Republican hold Republican gain Democratic hold Democratic gain Independent hold
Speaker before election
Bill Howell
Republican
Elected Speaker
Bill Howell
Republican

2009 Elections to the Virginia House of Delegates were held on November 3, 2009. Prior to the election, Republicans held 53 seats, Democrats held 43 seats, and Independents held 2 seats (both of whom caucus with the Republicans).

There were 2 seats previously held by Democrats that were vacant on election day: the 69th (Frank Hall resigned April 14, 2009) and the 80th (Ken Melvin resigned May 1, 2009). Eight incumbent Democrats were defeated, one incumbent Republican was defeated, and one open Republican seat was won by a Democrat.

The composition of the House of Delegates in 2010 was 59 Republicans, 2 Independents who caucus with the Republicans, and 39 Democrats.

== Special elections ==
- 81st district (Virginia Beach, Chesapeake) – fifth-term Republican Terrie Suit, chair of the General Laws committee, resigned on October 12, 2008, to take a job as a lobbyist. A special election was set for January 6, 2009. Barry Knight, a hog farmer and member of the Virginia Beach Planning Commission, was selected as the Republican nominee in a firehouse primary on November 29, 2008. On December 4, the Democrats nominated John LaCombe, a 24-year-old payday lending activist. Knight won the special election by an 83–17 margin.
- 70th district (Richmond, Henrico and Chesterfield Counties) – Dwight Clinton Jones, a Democrat in his eighth term, was elected mayor of Richmond on November 4, 2008. This special election was also scheduled for January 6, 2009. On December 6, 2008, the Democratic Party nominated Delores McQuinn, a member of Richmond City Council, for the seat. McQuinn was unopposed in the special election.
- 46th district (Alexandria, Fairfax County) – Brian Moran resigned his seat December 12, 2008 to concentrate on his campaign for governor. A special election was called for January 13, 2009. Both major parties held nominating caucuses on December 16, 2008. The Democratic nominee was Charniele Herring, an attorney from Alexandria. The Republicans nominated Joe Murray, an aide to U. S. Representative Joe Wilson of South Carolina. Herring won the election by 16 votes; the House, under Republican control, refused to seat her pending a recount requested by Murray. Herring was finally seated after a recount on January 26.

== Results ==
=== Retirements ===
Ten House members announced they would not run for re-election:

- Albert C. Eisenberg (D-Arlington) on January 22
- Frank D. Hargrove Sr. (R-Hanover) on January 26
- Jeffrey M. Frederick (R-Woodbridge) on February 13.
- Kenneth R. Melvin (D-Portsmouth) on February 24
- William H. Fralin Jr. (R-Roanoke) on February 28
- Clarke N. Hogan (R-Halifax) on March 9.
- Former Minority Leader Franklin P. Hall (D-Richmond) on March 28. Hall announced his retirement effective April 14, 2009. Governor Kaine immediately announced Hall's appointment to the state Alcoholic Beverage Control Board, effective the same date
- Steve Shannon (D-Fairfax) is the Democratic nominee for attorney general.
- Kris Amundson (D-Fairfax) announced her retirement on June 24, 2009
- Chris Saxman (R-Staunton) announced his retirement on July 17, 2009

In addition, Bob Hull (D-Fairfax) was defeated for renomination by Kaye Kory in the June 9 primary.

=== Overview ===
↓
59	39	2
Republican	Democratic

Parties		Candidates	Seats				Popular Vote		
Parties		Candidates	2007	2009	+/-	Strength	Vote	%	Change
	Republican		54	59	▲5	59.00%	1,047,069	56.76%	
	Democratic		44	39	▼5	39.00%	668,502	36.24%	
	Independent		2	2	Steady	2.00%	86,454	4.69%	
	Independent Greens		0	0	Steady	0.00%	11,915	0.65%	
	Constitution Party		0	0	Steady	0.00%	10,339	0.56%	
	Green		0	0	Steady	0.00%	981	0.05%	
	Libertarian		0	0	Steady	0.00%	580	0.03%	
-	Write-ins		0	0	Steady	0.00%	18,906	1.02%	
Total			100	100	0	100.00%	1,844,746	100.00%	-

=== By House of Delegates district ===
Party abbreviations: D - Democratic, R - Republican, C - Constitution Party, I - Independent, IG - Independent Green, L - Libertarian

District	Incumbent	Party	Elected	Status	2009 Result
1st	Terry Kilgore	Republican	1993	Reelected	Terry Kilgore (R) unopposed
2nd	Bud Phillips	Democratic	1989	Reelected	Bud Phillips (D) unopposed
3rd	Dan Bowling	Democratic	2006	Defeated	Will Morefield (R) 57.1% Dan Bowling (D) 42.8%
4th	Joe Johnson	Democratic	1989	Reelected	Joe Johnson (D) unopposed
5th	C. W. Carrico	Republican	2001	Reelected	C. W. Carrico (R) unopposed
6th	Anne B. Crockett-Stark	Republican	2005	Reelected	Anne B. Crockett-Stark (R) 65.2% Carole Pratt (D) 34.7%
7th	Dave Nutter	Republican	2001	Reelected	Dave Nutter (R) 60.1% Peggy Frank (D) 39.8%
8th	Morgan Griffith	Republican	1993	Reelected	Morgan Griffith (R) 68.8% Carter Turner (D) 31.0%
9th	Charles Poindexter	Republican	2007	Reelected	Charles Poindexter (R) 79.0% Sherman David Witcher (IG) 20.7%
10th	Ward Armstrong	Democratic	1991	Reelected	Ward Armstrong (D) 56.5% Edward Creed (R) 43.4%
11th	Onzlee Ware	Democratic	2003	Reelected	Onzlee Ware (D) 60.3% Troy Bird (R) 39.6%
12th	Jim Shuler	Democratic	1993	Reelected	Jim Shuler (D) 72.2% Paul Cornett (I) 27.3%
13th	Bob Marshall	Republican	1991	Reelected	Bob Marshall (R) 61.3% John Bell (D) 38.6%
14th	Danny Marshall	Republican	2001	Reelected	Danny Marshall (R) 64.1% Seward Anderson (D) 35.8%
15th	Todd Gilbert	Republican	2005	Reelected	Todd Gilbert (R) 69.3% John Lesinski (D) 30.7%
16th	Donald Merricks	Republican	2007	Reelected	Donald Merricks (R) unopposed
17th	William Fralin	Republican	2003	Retired; Republican hold	William Cleaveland (R) 62.0% Gwen Mason (D) 37.9%
18th	Clay Athey	Republican	2001	Reelected	Clay Athey (R) 82.4% Todd Jack (C) 17.0%
19th	Lacey Putney	Independent	1961	Reelected	Lacey Putney (I) 64.1% Lewis Medlin (D) 20.6% William Smith (C) 15.1%
20th	Chris Saxman	Republican	2001	Retired; Republican hold	Dickie Bell (R) 71.2% Erik Curren (D) 28.7%
21st	Bobby Mathieson	Democratic	2007	Defeated	Ron Villanueva (R) 49.9% Bobby Mathieson (D) 49.8%
22nd	Kathy Byron	Republican	1997	Reelected	Kathy Byron (R) unopposed
23rd	Shannon Valentine	Democratic	2006	Defeated	T. Scott Garrett (R) 50.4% Shannon Valentine (D) 49.4%
24th	Ben Cline	Republican	2002	Reelected	Ben Cline (R) 70.9% Jeff Price (D) 29.1%
25th	Steve Landes	Republican	1995	Reelected	Steve Landes (R) 73.2% Greg Marrow (D) 26.7%
26th	Matt Lohr	Republican	2005	Reelected	Matt Lohr (R) 73.0% Gene Hart Jr. (D) 26.9%
27th	Sam Nixon	Republican	1994	Reelected	Sam Nixon (R) unopposed
28th	William J. Howell	Republican	1987	Reelected	William J. Howell (R) 74.8% Craig Ennis (IG) 24.5%
29th	Beverly Sherwood	Republican	1993	Reelected	Beverly Sherwood (R) 80.0% Aaron Tweedie (I) 19.7%
30th	Ed Scott	Republican	2003	Reelected	Ed Scott (R) 75.5% Matt Carson (I) 24.4%
31st	Scott Lingamfelter	Republican	2001	Reelected	Scott Lingamfelter (R) unopposed
32nd	David Poisson	Democratic	2005	Defeated	Tag Greason (R) 57.5% David Poisson (D) 42.4%
33rd	Joe May	Republican	1993	Reelected	Joe May (R) unopposed
34th	Margi Vanderhye	Democratic	2007	Defeated	Barbara Comstock (R) 50.8% Margi Vanderhye (D) 49.1%
35th	Steve Shannon	Democratic	2003	Ran for Attorney General; Democratic hold	Mark Keam (D) 50.7% James Hyland (R) 49.2%
36th	Ken Plum	Democratic	1981	Reelected	Ken Plum (D) 59.9% Hugh "Mac" Cannon (R) 39.9%
37th	David Bulova	Democratic	2005	Reelected	David Bulova (D) 67.6% Chris DeCarlo (I) 24.7% Anna Choi (IG) 6.9%
38th	Bob Hull	Democratic	1992	Defeated in primary; Democratic hold	Kaye Kory (D) 59.5% Danny Smith (R) 40.2%
39th	Vivian E. Watts	Democratic	1995	Reelected	Vivian E. Watts (D) 56.4% Joseph Bury (R) 39.5% Matthew Cholko (L) 3.1% James Leslie (IG) 0.9%
40th	Tim Hugo	Republican	2002	Reelected	Tim Hugo (R) 63.4% Sue Conrad (D) 36.5%
41st	Dave Marsden	Democratic	2005	Reelected	Dave Marsden (D) 49.6% Kerry Bolognese (R) 48.6% Monique Berry (IG) 1.7%
42nd	Dave Albo	Republican	1993	Reelected	Dave Albo (R) 56.6% Greg Werkheiser (D) 43.3%
43rd	Mark Sickles	Democratic	2003	Reelected	Mark Sickles (D) 56.1% Timothy Nank (R) 43.8%
44th	Kris Amundson	Democratic	1999	Retired; Democratic hold	Scott Surovell (D) 53.4% James McConville (R) 44.9% Glenda Gail Parker (IG) 1.6%
45th	David Englin	Democratic	2005	Reelected	David Englin (D) 61.2% Vicki Vasques (R) 38.7%
46th	Charniele Herring	Democratic	2009	Reelected	Charniele Herring (D) 64.0% Sasha Gong (R) 35.9%
47th	Al Eisenberg	Democratic	2003	Retired; Democratic hold	Patrick Hope (D) 63.5% Eric Brescia (R) 31.7% Joshua Ruebner (G) 4.6%
48th	Bob Brink	Democratic	1997	Reelected	Bob Brink (D) 62.3% Aaron Ringel (R) 37.6%
49th	Adam Ebbin	Democratic	2003	Reelected	Adam Ebbin (D) unopposed
50th	Jackson Miller	Republican	2006	Reelected	Jackson Miller (R) 62.4% Jeanette Rishell (D) 37.5%
51st	Paul Nichols	Democratic	2007	Defeated	Rich Anderson (R) 50.8% Paul Nichols (D) 49.1%
52nd	Jeff Frederick	Republican	2003	Retired; Democratic takeover	Luke Torian (D) 51.9% Rafael Lopez (R) 47.8%
53rd	Jim Scott	Democratic	1991	Reelected	Jim Scott (D) 61.4% Christopher Merola (R) 38.5%
54th	Bobby Orrock	Republican	1989	Reelected	Bobby Orrock (R) unopposed
55th	Frank Hargrove	Republican	1981	Retired; Republican hold	John Cox (R) 75.5% Robert Barnette (D) 24.2%
56th	Bill Janis	Republican	2001	Reelected	Bill Janis (R) 69.7% James Towey (D) 30.2%
57th	David Toscano	Democratic	2005	Reelected	David Toscano (D) 78.2% Robert Brandon Smith III (I) 21.4%
58th	Rob Bell	Republican	2001	Reelected	Rob Bell (R) 67.2% Cynthia Neff (D) 32.7%
59th	Watkins Abbitt, Jr.	Independent	1985	Reelected	Watkins Abbitt, Jr. (I) unopposed
60th	Clarke Hogan	Republican	2001	Retired; Republican hold	James E. Edmunds (R) unopposed
61st	Tommy Wright	Republican	2000	Reelected	Tommy Wright (R) unopposed
62nd	Riley Ingram	Republican	1991	Reelected	Riley Ingram (R) unopposed
63rd	Rosalyn Dance	Democratic	2005	Reelected	Rosalyn Dance (D) unopposed
64th	Bill Barlow	Democratic	1991	Reelected	Bill Barlow (D) 50.7% Stan Clark (R) 46.7% Albert Burckard Jr. (IG) 2.5%
65th	Lee Ware	Republican	1998	Reelected	Lee Ware (R) 71.5% Gary Rinehardt (I) 28.3%
66th	Kirk Cox	Republican	1989	Reelected	Kirk Cox (R) unopposed
67th	Chuck Caputo	Democratic	2005	Defeated	James LeMunyon (R) 52.7% Chuck Caputo (D) 47.3%
68th	Manoli Loupassi	Republican	2007	Reelected	Manoli Loupassi (R) 69.7% Bill Grogan (I) 29.8%
69th	vacant				Betsy B. Carr (D) 72.7% Ernesto Sampson (R) 21.6% Shirley Harvey (I) 5.5%
70th	Delores McQuinn	Democratic	2009	Reelected	Delores McQuinn (D) 77.6% Henry Otis Brown (I) 21.7%
71st	Jennifer McClellan	Democratic	2005	Reelected	Jennifer McClellan (D) 82.4% Silver Persinger (I) 17.0%
72nd	Jimmie Massie	Republican	2007	Reelected	Jimmie Massie (R) unopposed
73rd	John O'Bannon	Republican	2000	Reelected	John O'Bannon (R) 62.3% Thomas Shields (D) 37.6%
74th	Joe Morrissey	Democratic	2007	Reelected	Joe Morrissey (D) 76.2% Michael Gage (R) 23.7%
75th	Roslyn Tyler	Democratic	2005	Reelected	Roslyn Tyler (D) unopposed
76th	Chris Jones	Republican	1997	Reelected	Chris Jones (R) unopposed
77th	Lionell Spruill	Democratic	1993	Reelected	Lionell Spruill (D) unopposed
78th	John Cosgrove	Republican	2001	Reelected	John Cosgrove (R) unopposed
79th	Johnny Joannou	Democratic	1997	Reelected	Johnny Joannou (D) unopposed
80th	vacant				Matthew James (D) 68.5% Jennifer Lee (R) 31.3%
81st	Barry Knight	Republican	2009	Reelected	Barry Knight (R) unopposed
82nd	Harry "Bob" Purkey	Republican	1985	Reelected	Harry "Bob" Purkey (R) 60.4% Peter Schmidt (D) 35.1% John Parmele (I) 4.4%
83rd	Joe Bouchard	Democratic	2007	Defeated	Chris Stolle (R) 59.5% Joe Bouchard (D) 40.4%
84th	Sal Iaquinto	Republican	2005	Reelected	Sal Iaquinto (R) unopposed
85th	Bob Tata	Republican	1983	Reelected	Bob Tata (R) 81.1% French D. Mackes Jr. (C) 18.4%
86th	Tom Rust	Republican	2001	Reelected	Tom Rust (R) 53.8% Stevens Miller (D) 46.0%
87th	Paula Miller	Democratic	2004	Reelected	Paula Miller (D) 56.6% John Amiral (R) 43.2%
88th	Mark Cole	Republican	2001	Reelected	Mark Cole (R) unopposed
89th	Kenny Alexander	Democratic	2002	Reelected	Kenny Alexander (D) 69.4% Anthony Triplin (I) 30.6%
90th	Algie Howell	Democratic	2003	Reelected	Algie Howell (D) 66.6% Jason Call (R) 33.1%
91st	Tom Gear	Republican	2001	Reelected	Tom Gear (R) 48.3% Gordon Helsel (I) 32.6% Samuel Eure (D) 19.0%
92nd	Jeion Ward	Democratic	2003	Reelected	Jeion Ward (D) unopposed
93rd	Phil Hamilton	Republican	1988	Defeated	Robin Abbott (D) 53.9% Phil Hamilton (R) 45.6%
94th	Glenn Oder	Republican	2001	Reelected	Glenn Oder (R) 67.6% Gary West (D) 32.2%
95th	Mamye BaCote	Democratic	2003	Reelected	Mamye BaCote (D) unopposed
96th	Brenda Pogge	Republican	2007	Reelected	Brenda Pogge (R) unopposed
97th	Chris Peace	Republican	2006	Reelected	Chris Peace (R) unopposed
98th	Harvey Morgan	Republican	1979	Reelected	Harvey Morgan (R) unopposed
99th	Albert C. Pollard	Democratic	2008	Reelected	Albert C. Pollard (D) 52.2% Catherine Crabill (R) 47.7%
100th	Lynwood Lewis	Democratic	2003	Reelected	Lynwood Lewis (D) 64.0% Melody Scalley (R) 34.8% John W. Smith Jr. (I) 1.1%
