= 2003 Virginia House of Delegates election =

2003 Virginia House of Delegates elections
- November 4, 2003

All 100 seats in the Virginia House of Delegates 51 seats needed for a majority
- Turnout: 30.8% ▼
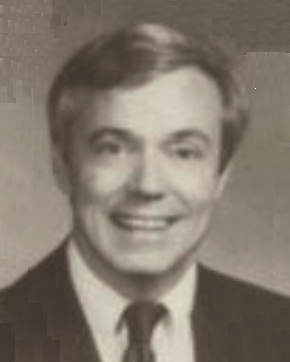

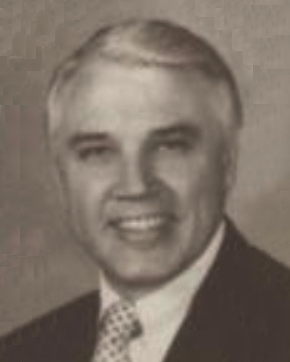
	Majority party	Minority party
Leader	Bill Howell	Frank Hall
Party	Republican	Democratic
Leader since	January 8, 2003	January 9, 2002
Leader's seat	28th	69th
Last election	64	34
Seats won	61	37
Seat change	▼3	▲3
Popular vote	630,430	403,531
Percentage	57.9%	37.0%
Swing	▲1.9%	▼1.9%
- Results: Republican hold Republican gain Democratic hold Democratic gain Independent hold
Speaker before election
Bill Howell
Republican
Elected Speaker
Bill Howell
Republican

The Virginia House of Delegates election of 2003 was held on Tuesday, November 4.

== Overview ==
↓
61	37	2
Republican	Democratic

Parties		Candidates	Seats				Popular Vote		
Parties		Candidates	2001	2003	+/-	Strength	Vote	%	Change
	Republican	74	64	61	▼3	61.00%	630,430	57.85%	
	Democratic	57	34	37	▲3	37.00%	403,531	37.03%	
	Independent	11	2	2	Steady	2.00%	47,119	4.32%	
	Independent Greens	1	0	0	Steady	0.00%	362	0.03%	
-	Write-ins		0	0	Steady	0.00%	28,031	1.61%	
Total		143	100	100	0	100.00%	1,089,815	100.00%	-

== Predictions ==
Source	Ranking	As of
The Cook; Political Report	Safe R	October 4, 2002

== Detailed Results ==
Party abbreviations: D - Democratic, R - Republican, I - Independent, IG - Independent Green, L - Libertarian

Note: Only House districts that were contested by more than one candidate, or that switched party control are included here.

District	Incumbent	Party	Elected	Status	2003 Result
5th	Bill Carrico	Republican	2001	Reelected	Bill Carrico (R) 54.9% Tom B. Graham (D) 45.1%
6th	Benny Keister	Democrat	2005	Reelected	Benny Keister (D) 50.1% Morgan Morris, Jr (R) 49.4%
8th	Morgan Griffith	Republican	2001	Reelected	Morgan Griffith (R) 59.2% Mark Q. Emick, Sr (D) 40.8%
9th	Allen Dudley	Republican	1993	Reelected	Allen Dudley (R) 58.9% Mark H. Newbill (D) 41.1%
15th	Allen L. Louderback	Republican	2001	Reelected	Allen L. Louderback (R) 63.1% Thomas A. Lewis (D) 36.8%
16th	Robert Hurt	Republican	2001	Reelected	Robert Hurt (R) 61.6% Kimble Reynolds, Jr. (D) 38.4%
17th	A. Victor Thomas	Democrat	1973	Retired	William Fralin (R) 62.1% Linda Wyatt (D) 31.8% Gary Bowman (I) 6.1%
19th	Lacey Putney	Independent	1961	Reelected	Lacey Putney (I) 73.6% Art Lipscomb (D) 26.5%
21st	John J. Welch	Republican	2001	Reelected	John J. Welch (R) 61.9% Tim Jackson (D) 38.0%
24th	Ben Cline	Republican	2002	Reelected	Ben Cline (R) 69.2% Eric W. Sheffield (I) 30.8%
26th	Glenn M. Weatherholtz	Republican	1995	Reelected	Glenn M. Weatherholtz (R) 54.5% Lowell L. Fulk (D) 45.4%
31st	Scott Lingamfelter	Republican	2001	Reelected	Scott Lingamfelter (R) 55.0% David G. Brickley (D) 45.0%
32nd	Dick Black	Republican	1998	Reelected	Dick Black (R) 52.0% Patricia H Morrissey (D) 36.6% David G. McWatters (I) 11.3%
35th	Jeannemarie Devolites	Republican	1997	Elected to State Senate	Steve Shannon (D) 51.9% Robert M McDowell (R) 48.1%
37th	Chap Petersen	Democratic	2001	Reelected	Chap Petersen (D) 59.5% Jack Rust (R) 40.5%
41st	Jim Dillard	Republican	1980	Reelected	Jim Dillard (R) 63.5% Michael J. Golden (I) 26.9% John M. Wolfe (I) 9.2%
43rd	Tom Bolvin	Republican	1997	Defeated	Mark D. Sickles (D) 53.8% Tom Bolvin (R) 46.1%
44th	Kristen J. Amundson	Democrat	1999	Reelected	Kristen J. Amundson (D) 56.3% David Kennedy (R) 43.6%
45th	Marian Van Landingham	Democratic	1981	Reelected	Marian Van Landingham (D) 63.6% Robert J. Test (R) 36.2%
47th	Jim Almand	Democratic	1981	Retired	Al Eisenberg (D) 65.5% R. Christian Hoff (R) 34.4%
48th	Robert H. Brink	Democratic	1997	Reelected	Robert H. Brink (D) 60.9% Steve Sass (R) 39.0%
52nd	Jack Rollinson	Republican	2003	Defeated in Primary	Jeff Frederick (R) 56.7% Charles Taylor (D) 43.2%
56th	Bill Janis	Republican	2001	Reelected	Bill Janis (R) 57.8% Hunter H. McGuire, III (D) 42.2%
59th	Watkins Abbitt Jr.	Independent	1985	Reelected	Watkins Abbitt Jr. (I) 67.1% Allen Hale (D) 32.9%
60th	Clarke N. Hogan	Republican	2001	Reelected	Clarke N. Hogan (R) 66.4% Brad Wike (D) 33.6%
64th	William K. Barlow	Democrat	1991	Reelected	William K. Barlow (D) 56.6% Troy Lapetina (R) 43.4%
65th	Lee Ware	Republican	1997	Reelected	Lee Ware (R) 75.1% Robert E. Williams (D) 24.9%
75th	J. Paul Councill	Democrat	1973	Reelected	J. Paul Councill (D) 71.3% John B. Nicholson (I) 28.7%
81st	Terrie Suit	Republican	1999	Reelected	Terrie Suit (R) 69.6% Lois Williams (D) 25.0% Sharon Bivens (I) 5.4%
85th	Bob Tata	Republican	1983	Reelected	Bob Tata (D) 73.5% Eric Potter (R) 26.4%
86th	Tom Rust	Republican	2001	Reelected	Tom Rust (R) 63.8% Jim Kelly (D) 36.1%
88th	Mark Cole	Republican	2001	Reelected	Mark Cole (R) 71.2% Chuck Feldbush (D) 28.7%
90th	Winsome Sears	Republican	2001	Retired	Algie T. Howell, Jr. (D) 99.4%
92nd	Mary T. Christian	Democrat	1985	Retired	Jeion Ward (D) 54.1% Dr. Alvin Bryant (R) 45.5%
95th	Flora D. Crittenden	Democrat	1993	Retired	Mamye BaCote (D) 64.7% Raymond Johnson (R) 34.4%
96th	Melanie Rapp	Republican	2000	Retired	Melanie Rapp (R) 54.1% Philip Forgit (D) 45.7%
98th	Harvey Morgan	Republican	1980	Reelected	Harvey Morgan (R) 78.8% Michael Rowe (I) 21.1%
99th	Albert C. Pollard	Democrat	1999	Retired	Albert C. Pollard (D) 65.1% Shawn Donahue (D) 34.9%
100th	Robert Bloxom	Republican	2000	Retired	Lynwood Lewis (D) 59.3% Thomas B. Dix (R) 40.6%

== See also ==
- 2003 United States elections
- 2003 Virginia elections
  - 2003 Virginia Senate election
