= Felisha Storm =

American politician and member of the Vermont State House of Representatives

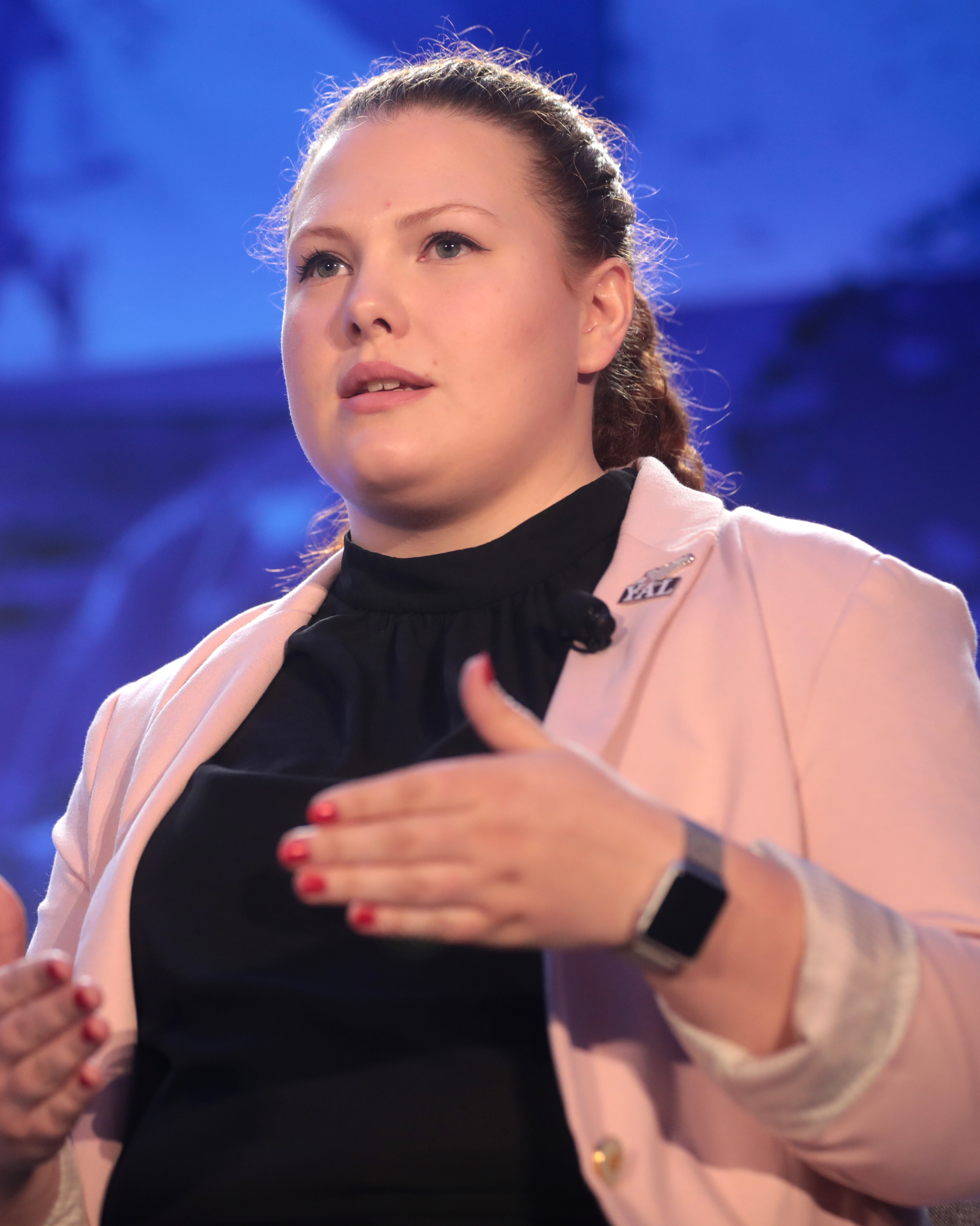
- Storm in 2019

Member of the Vermont House of Representatives from the Franklin-7 district
- In office January 9, 2019 – January 4, 2023
- Preceded by: Cindy Weed
- Succeeded by: Penny Demar

Personal details
- Born: Felisha Rose Leffler U.S.
- Party: Republican
- Education: Sweet Briar College (BA)

Felisha Rose Leffler Storm is an American politician who served in the Vermont House of Representatives from 2019 to 2023. She was the Republican nominee for the Virginia House of Delegates for the 84th district in the 2025 election, losing to incumbent delegate Nadarius Clark.

== Early life, education, and career ==
Storm (née Leffler) was raised in Enosburgh, Vermont, and earned a Bachelor of Arts in government from Sweet Briar College. She was inspired to get into politics after meeting then-governor Jim Douglas while volunteering as a child at homecoming and deployment ceremonies of military personnel.

She has worked as a realtor in the Hampton Roads area and is a volunteer firefighter and EMT. She also worked as the Virginia Director of Grassroots Operations for Americans for Prosperity.

== Vermont House of Representatives ==
=== Elections ===
In 2018, Storm ran for the Vermont House of Representatives as a Republican, defeating incumbent Progressive/Democratic representative Cindy Weed with 52.8% of the vote. At 23 years old, she was the youngest person elected to the Vermont General Assembly.

She ran for re-election in 2020, defeating Progressive/Democratic candidate Dennis Williams with 58.8% of the vote.

She did not run for re-election in 2022. Although Vermont Republican Party chair Paul Dame floated her name as a candidate for the 2022 United States House of Representatives election in Vermont, she opted not to run.

=== Tenure ===
In 2020, Storm reported a potential gunshot - revealed to be shot from a car driving outside her home based on her home security system - and an anonymous letter alleging she engaged in "un-American" activities to the police.

== 2025 Virginia House of Delegates campaign ==
In 2025, Storm announced her campaign for the Virginia House of Delegates for the 84th district, challenging incumbent Democratic delegate Nadarius Clark. She pledged to protect 2nd Amendment rights and right-to-work laws as well as oppose illegal immigration, solar panels on farmland, and speed cameras; further claiming the latter "violate our Fourth and Fifth Amendment rights." As of June 30, 2025, she had raised $119,945 and spent $26,870 whereas Clark had raised $248,306 and spent $169,760. In the November general election, Storm was defeated by Clark with 39% to his 61% of the vote.

== Personal life ==
Previously a resident of Enosburg Falls, Vermont, Storm now lives in Virginia.

She was married in 2023 and divorced in 2025 when she left her then husband Joshua Storm for alleged infidelity.

== Electoral history ==
=== 2025 ===
2025 Virginia 84th House of Delegates District general election
| Party | Candidate | Votes | % |
|---|---|---|---|
| Democratic | Nadarius Clark (incumbent) | 23,034 | 60.19% |
| Republican | Felisha Storm | 15,192 | 39.70% |
| Write-in | | 44 | 0.11% |
| Total votes | | 38,270 | 100.00% |
| Democratic hold | | | |

=== 2020 ===
Vermont House of Representatives district Franklin-7 election, 2020
| Party | Candidate | Votes | % |
|---|---|---|---|
| Republican | Felisha Leffler (incumbent) | 1,178 | 58.8 |
| Progressive | Dennis Williams | 820 | 40.9 |
| Write-in | Write-ins | 7 | 0.3 |
| Total votes | | 2,005 | 100.0 |
| Republican hold | | | |

=== 2018 ===
Vermont House of Representatives district Franklin-7 election, 2018
| Party | Candidate | Votes | % |
|---|---|---|---|
| Republican | Felisha Leffler | 885 | 52.8 |
| Progressive | Cindy Weed (incumbent) | 790 | 47.1 |
| Total votes | | 1,696 | 100.0 |
| Republican gain from Progressive | | | |
