= Gladys Keating =

American politician

Gladys Brown Keating

Member of the Virginia House of Delegates from Fairfax
- In office January 1978 – January 2000
- Preceded by: Jim Dillard
- Succeeded by: Thomas M. Bolvin

Personal details
- Born: Gladys Brown; August 1, 1923 Manhattan, New York City, New York, U.S.
- Died: August 19, 2014 (aged 91) Wilmington, North Carolina, U.S.
- Resting place: Arlington National Cemetery
- Party: Democratic
- Spouse: John A. Keating (m. 1950; died 2003)
- Children: 5
- Education: Queens College; Weatherford College; George Mason University

Gladys Brown Keating (August 1, 1923 – August 19, 2014) was an American civic activist, military spouse and Democratic politician who lived in Fairfax County, Virginia, for 45 years, during 22 of which she represented the 43rd district in the Virginia General Assembly (1978-2000).

== Early and family life ==
Born on the lower east side of Manhattan in New York City, Gladys Brown had two sisters, Barbara and Connie, who she enjoyed traveling with in her later years. Gladys graduated from Andrew Jackson High School in Queens at the age of 16. She attended Queens College and would later attend Weatherford College in Texas and George Mason University in Virginia. In 1950, she married John A. Keating, an officer in the United States Army who would rise to the rank of lieutenant colonel. Together, they had three sons and two daughters.

== Career ==
Before her marriage, Gladys worked in an actuarial office with Metropolitan Life Insurance Company in Manhattan, NY. Following her marriage, she accompanied her military husband, started a family and established their household in various locations, including Germany, Colorado, Massachusetts, and Texas.

In 1961, the Keatings moved to Franconia, Virginia, during Massive Resistance. She became involved in many civic activities, including the Brookland/Bush Hill civic association, Edison school Parent Teacher Association, FYA girls' softball league and Olivet Episcopal Church. She won election to the Fairfax Library system board of trustees. In 1979, Keating won the Fairfax Human Rights Commission award, and received the Annandale Business and Professional Women's Club honored her as its woman of the year in 1977.

Mrs. Keating also became involved in the local Democratic Party. In 1973 and 1975 she unsuccessfully ran for one of Fairfax County's five seats in what was then a multi-delegate district in the Virginia House of Delegates, but in 1973 she came in ninth (lawyer Thomas J. Rothrock became the only Democrat elected) and in 1975 Keating came in sixth (behind Democrats Rothrock and Richard L. Saslaw). In 1977, a court decision mandated single-member districts and Keating won election in the 19th district (covering part of Fairfax County). She won re-election ten times, although the district number changed twice following the 1980 census, for the 1981 election from the 52nd, then in the 1983 and successive elections from the 43rd district.

At the time of her forced retirement in 2000, Keating was the legislature's most senior woman. She had helped form the legislature's Women's Caucus, became known for her support of family law and consumer issues. Legislation she successfully sponsored required equitable distribution in divorces, as well as championed tuition assistance for members of Virginia's National Guard, forbad telephone companies from selling customer lists, required prominent posting of retail stores' return policies, promoted firearms safety and required medical insurance companies to cover mammograms. Keating became the first woman to serve on the Committee on Corporations, Insurance and Banking (eventually becoming its co-chair), as well as the first woman to serve on the Militia and Police Committee (also becoming its chair). She also served on the rules committee, the committee on counties cities and town, and the Virginia Military Advisory Council, as well as represented Virginia at the National Conference of State Legislatures. In the 1999 election, Republican (and insurance agent) Thomas M. Bolvin defeated incumbent Keating. The following election, Bolvin would narrowly win over Democrat Mark Sickles, who had previously worked for Keating, and who defeated Bolvin in 2003 and has won re-election since. While Keating remained in northern Virginia, she taught part-time at Northern Virginia Community College, and remained active with the League of Women Voters.

== Death and legacy ==
After a series of strokes in 2006, and the death of her husband in 2003, Keating spent her final years near Wilmington, North Carolina, near some of her children and grandchildren. She died of congestive heart failure age 91, at the New Hanover Regional Medical Center. After a service at Olivet Episcopal Church, where Keating long served as lay reader, she was interred at Arlington National Cemetery beside her husband.

During her legislative service, Keating gave an oral history, housed with the University of Mississippi's collection of interviews with Southern women legislators.

Virginia House of Delegates
Preceded by Jim Dillard	Virginia Delegate for Fairfax; 1977–1999	Succeeded by Thomas M. Bolvin
