= Chris Head =

Chris Head may refer to:

- Chris Head (musician), guitarist with Anti-Flag
- Chris Head (politician) (born 1963), American politician
