= A.C. Cordoza =

American politician (born 1989)

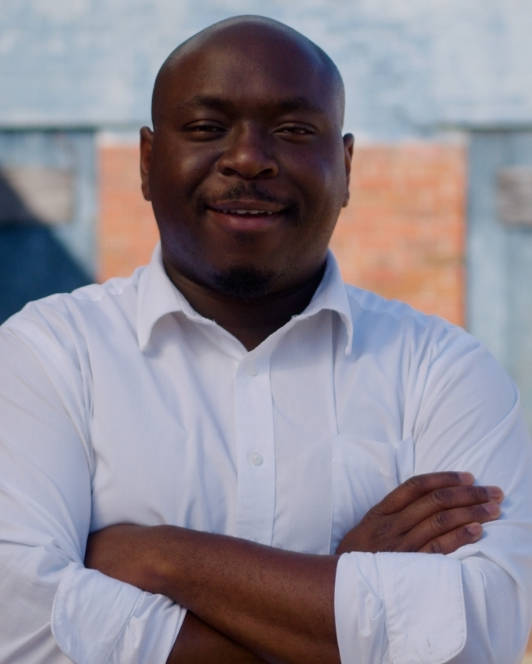
- Cordoza posing for a political ad

Member of the Virginia House of Delegates
- In office January 12, 2022 – January 14, 2026
- Preceded by: Martha Mugler
- Succeeded by: Virgil Thornton Sr.
- Constituency: 91st district (2022–2024); 86th district (2024–present)

Personal details
- Born: Aijalon Carlton Cordoza; 1989 (age 36–37) New York City, U.S.
- Party: Republican
- Education: Thomas Nelson Community College (AA)
- Website: www.cordozaforvirginia.com

Military service
- Branch/service: United States Air Force
- Years of service: 2013–2016

Aijalon Carlton "A.C." Cordoza (born 1989) is an American politician from Virginia. He was first elected to the Virginia House of Delegates in 2021, defeating incumbent Democratic Delegate Martha Mugler. Cordoza represented the 86th District, which covers a large slice of Hampton, as well as all of the neighboring city of Poquoson, and a small slice of neighboring York County. He ran for re-election in 2023 and 2025, winning against Jarris Taylor Jr. in 2023 but losing to Virgil Thornton Sr. in 2025.

== Early life ==
Aijalon Cordoza was born in New York City, and grew up in Hampton, Virginia. In 2008, he graduated from Hampton High School; in 2013, he joined the United States Air Force, in which he served for three years before leaving honorably.

Cordoza began attending Thomas Nelson Community College in Hampton in 2014, graduating in 2016 with an associate degree in information technology. Cordoza has since become a cybersecurity professional at Newport News Shipbuilding. He lives in Hampton.

== Career ==
He became interested in politics during the 2008 presidential election due to "the possibility of the nation electing the first black President". After the election, Cordoza decided his beliefs were more aligned with the Republican Party, despite his past support for Barack Obama. He has become vice-chair of the Hampton Republican Party.

=== 2020 Hampton City Council election ===
In 2020, Cordoza ran for the Hampton City Council, his first election. He lost, coming in fifth (the top three finishers became city councilors), with 9.8% of the vote.

=== 2021 Virginia House of Delegates election ===
In 2021, Cordoza ran for Virginia's 91st House of Delegates district and defeated incumbent first-term Democrat Martha Mugler by just 94 votes, with 49.4% of the vote to Mugler's 49.0%. After a recount the final count ended up with Cordoza winning by 64 votes.

=== Post-House career ===
Cordoza founded the Justice for Democracy PAC, a PAC heavily financed by Peter Thiel. In 2026, the group raised over $9 million against the 2026 Virginia redistricting amendment. The group invoked the civil rights movement in its advertising, alleging that amendment was akin to Jim Crow, drawing condemnation from the NAACP as misinformation.

== Controversies ==
In the lead-up to the 2025 Virginia House of Delegates election, Cordoza's opponent ran an attack ad that claimed Cordoza had sexually harassed a teenager, ran a sexting ring on an "open forum for sexual predators", and brandished a firearm on a retired state trooper. Cordoza called the claims "false and misleading in nature".

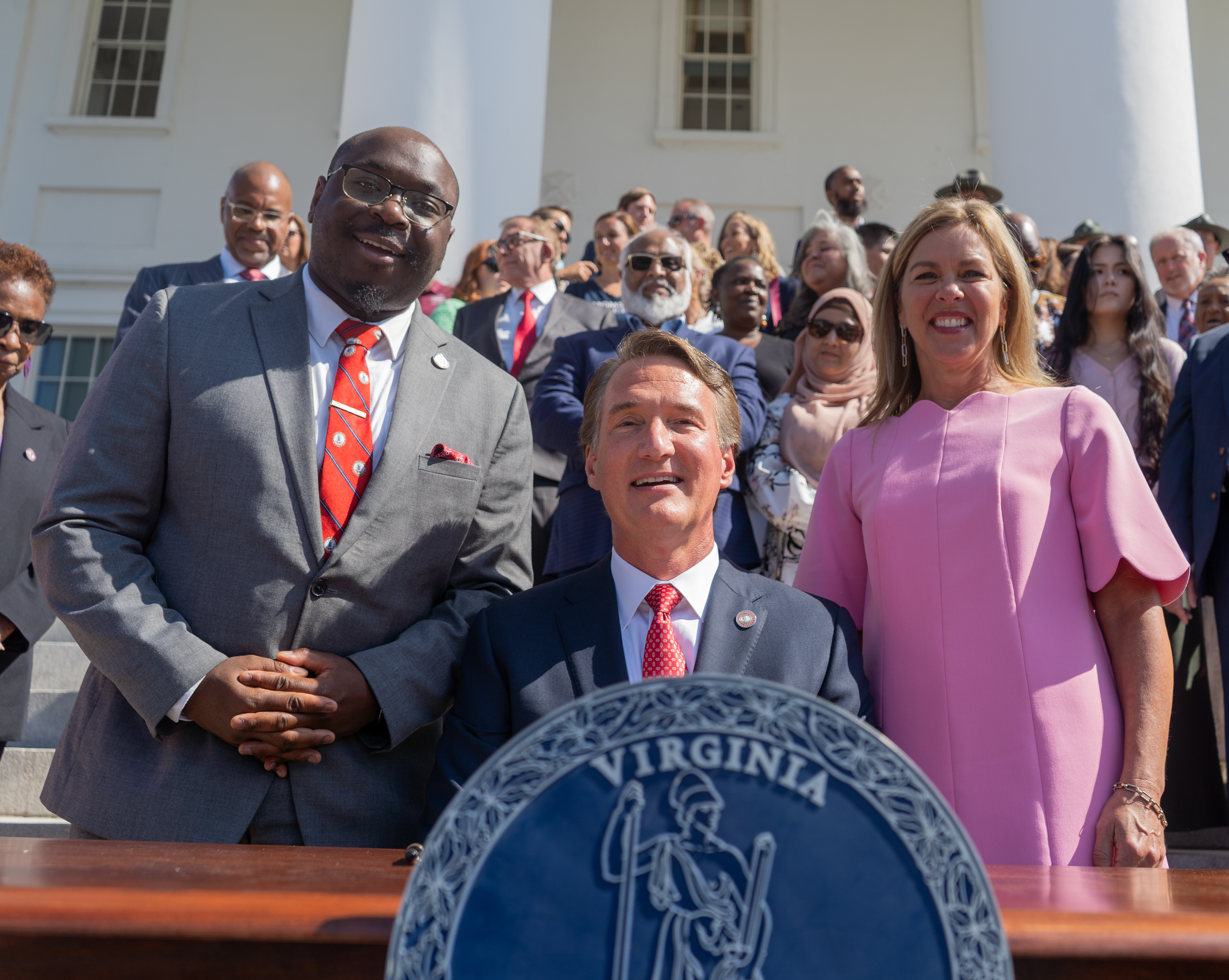
Cordoza with Governor Glenn Youngkin in September 2023

In October 2025, during a political campaign, a staffer for Cordoza's opponent allegedly threatened to "put a knot" on the head of Cordoza. A Virginia magistrate granted a protective order for Cordoza. During the same campaign the opponent obtained a protective order against Cordoza, alleging Cordoza had engaged in "armed harassment and intimidation" against a supporter.

== Electoral history ==
Date	Election	Candidate	Party	Votes	%
Hampton City Council
November 3, 2020	General	Christine Snead	Nonpartisan	9,066	26.5%
November 3, 2020	General	William Henry Hobbs Jr.	Nonpartisan	7,319	21.4%
November 3, 2020	General	Chris Luther Bowman	Nonpartisan	7,264	21.3%
November 3, 2020	General	Lance Jones Jr.	Nonpartisan	6,531	19.1%
November 3, 2020	General	Aijalon Carlton Cordoza	Nonpartisan	3,346	9.8%
Virginia's 91st House of Delegates district
November 2, 2021	General	Aijalon Carlton Cordoza	Republican	13,741 (prior to recount)	49.4% (prior to recount)
November 2, 2021	General	Martha Mugler (inc.)	Democratic	13,647 (prior to recount)	49.0% (prior to recount)
November 2, 2021	General	Charles West	Libertarian	417 (prior to recount)	1.5% (prior to recount)
Virginia's 86th House of Delegates district
November 7, 2023	General	Aijalon Carlton Cordoza	Republican	14,362	56.4%
November 7, 2023	General	Jarris Louis Taylor Jr.	Democratic	11,083	43.5%
November 4, 2025	General	Virgil G. Thornton Sr.	Democratic	17,081	53.9%
November 4, 2025	General	Aijalon Carlton Cordoza	Republican	14,563	46.0%

Virginia House of Delegates
Preceded by Martha Mugler	Member of the Virginia House of Delegates from the 91st district 2022–present	Incumbent
