= Chris Head (politician) =

American politician (born 1963)

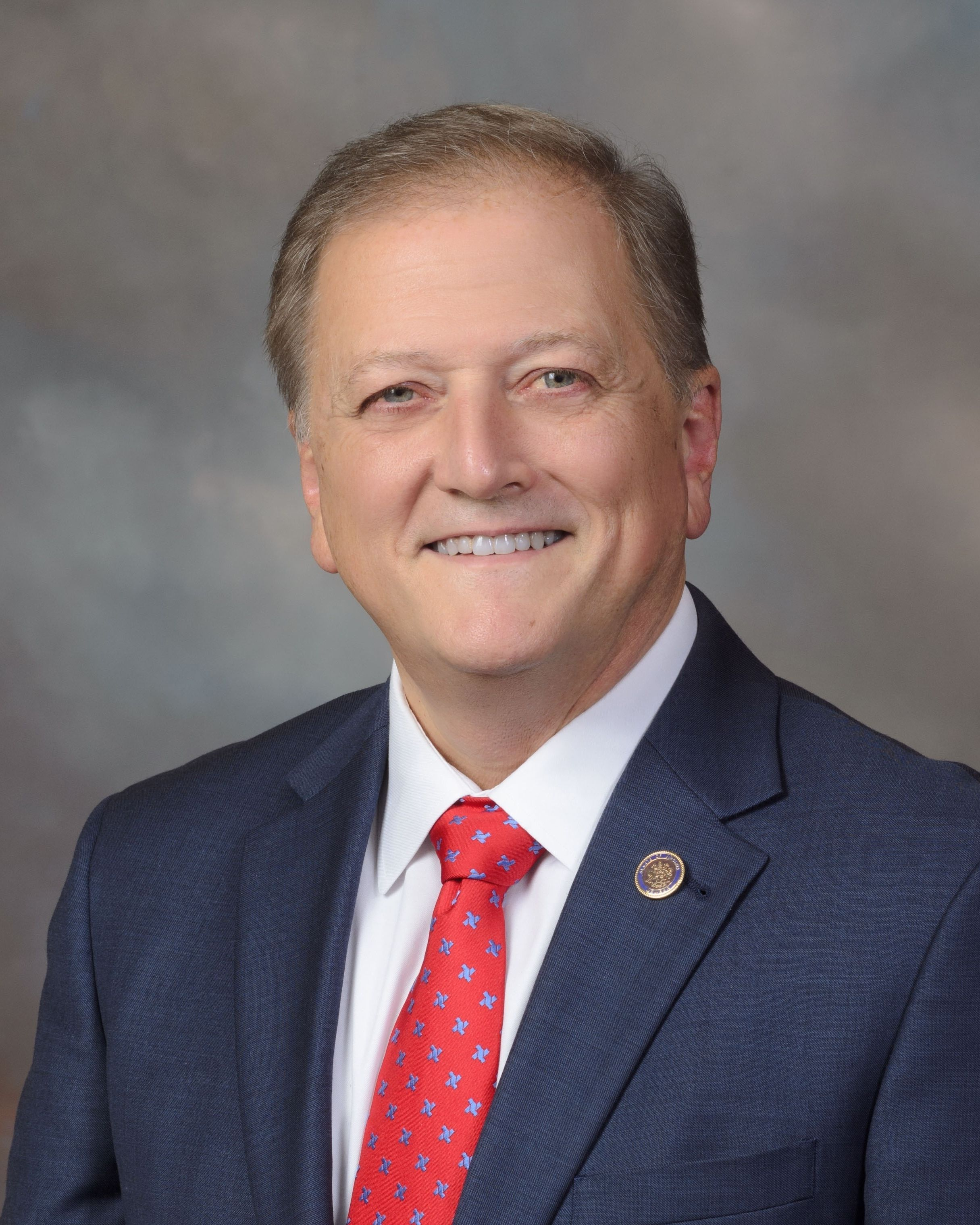

Member of the Virginia Senate from the 3rd district
- Incumbent
- Assumed office January 10, 2024
- Preceded by: Tommy Norment (redistricting)

Member of the Virginia House of Delegates from the 17th district
- In office January 11, 2012 – January 10, 2024
- Preceded by: William Cleaveland
- Succeeded by: Terry Austin (Redistricting)

Personal details
- Born: Christopher T. Head; January 13, 1963 (age 63) Commerce, Georgia, U.S.
- Party: Republican
- Spouse: Elizabeth Ann Frost
- Children: 3
- Education: University of Georgia (B.Mus.)
- Occupation: In-home health care
- Committees: Education and Health, General Laws and Technology, Rehabilitation and Social Services
- Website: senatorchrishead.com

Christopher T. Head (born January 13, 1963) is an American politician. A Republican, he currently serves in the Senate of Virginia, representing the 3rd district which includes all of Alleghany County, Botetourt County, Craig County, Rockbridge County, Buena Vista, Covington, Lexington, Staunton and Waynesboro, and parts of Augusta County and Roanoke County. He previously served in the Virginia House of Delegates from 2012 to 2024, representing the 17th district, made up parts of Botetourt and Roanoke counties and the city of Roanoke, in the western part of the state.

== Early life, education, business career ==
Chris Head grew up in Commerce, Georgia. He received a BMus degree from the University of Georgia in 1985. Shortly after he moved to Virginia, where he was a small business owner. In 2001, Chris and his wife, Besty, co-founded a franchise of Home Instead Senior Care, an in-home health care service business. They have three children. He is a deacon at his church, Bonsack Baptist, and sings in the choir. He is a member of multiple civic and philanthropic organizations in the Roanoke Valley and in 2009 was awarded the Roanoke Regional Small Business of the Year.

== Political career ==
When William Fralin retired from representing Virginia's 17th House of Delegates district in 2009, Head ran for the Republican nomination. He finished second in a five-way primary to William Cleaveland.

Cleaveland chose not to run for a second term in 2011, and Head was nominated to replace him. Head defeated Democratic candidate Freeda S. Cathcart in the general election, 11,852-6,207.

In the House, Head most recently served as Vice Chair of the House Committee on Health, Welfare, and Institutions, as well as on the House Committee on Commerce and Labor, the House Committee on Privileges and Elections, and the House Committee on Rules. He previously served on the House Committee on Appropriations, House Committee on Finance, and the House Committee on Military, Police, & Public Safety. He also served on the Joint Commission on Administrative Rules, which reviews regulations of the executive branch. He is also the founder and chairman of the Business Development Caucus in the House of Delegates. He previously served as co-chair of the Virginia Small Business Commission.

Following redistricting, Head sought election to the Virginia Senate in 2023. Head secured the Republican nomination uncontested and later defeated Democratic candidate Jade Harris in the general election (65.88% to 33.99%). He currently serves on the Senate Committee on Education & Health, the Senate Committee on General Laws & Technology, and the Senate Committee on Rehabilitation & Social Services.

== Electoral history ==
Date	Election	Candidate	Party	Votes	%
Virginia House of Delegates, 17th district
June 9, 2009	Republican primary	Bill H. Cleaveland		893	28.04
June 9, 2009	Republican primary	Christopher T. Head		769	24.15
June 9, 2009	Republican primary	Michael A. "Mike" Wray		613	19.25
June 9, 2009	Republican primary	Josh C. Johnson		549	17.24
June 9, 2009	Republican primary	Melvin E. Williams		360	11.30
November 8, 2011	General	Christopher T. Head	Republican	11,852	65.46
November 8, 2011	General	Freeda L. Cathcart	Democratic	6,207	34.28
November 8, 2011	General	Write-ins		44	0.24
November 8, 2011	General	William Cleaveland retired; seat stayed Republican			
November 5, 2013	General	Christopher T. Head Incumbent	Republican	15,222	62
November 5, 2013	General	Freeda L. Cathcart	Democratic	9,262	37.7
November 5, 2013	General	Write-ins		68	0.3
June 9, 2015	Republican Primary	Christopher T. Head Incumbent		1,284	57.7
June 9, 2015	Republican Primary	Harry Griego		1,152	47.3
November 3, 2015	General	Christopher T. Head Incumbent	Republican	15,091	96.5
November 3, 2015	General	All others		540	3.5
November 7, 2017	General	Christopher T. Head Incumbent	Republican	15,997	60.6
November 7, 2017	General	Djuna Osborne	Democratic	10,378	39.3
November 7, 2017	General	All others		39	0.1
November 5, 2019	General	Christopher T. Head Incumbent	Republican	15,288	93.5
November 5, 2019	General	All others		1,058	6.5
November 2, 2021	General	Christopher T. Head Incumbent	Republican	26,102	92.8
November 2, 2021	General	All others		2,011	7.2
Senate of Virginia, 3rd district
November 7, 2023	General	Christopher T. Head	Republican	41,381	65.88
November 7, 2023	General	Jade D. Harris	Democratic	21,353	33.99
November 7, 2023	General	All others/Write-In		83	0.13

== Notes ==
Virginia House of Delegates
Preceded by William Cleaveland	Member of the Virginia House of Delegates from the 17th district 2012–2024	Succeeded by Mark Sickles
Senate of Virginia
Preceded by Tommy Norment	Member of the Virginia Senate from the 3rd district 2024–Present	Incumbent
