= Brad Marrs =

American politician (born 1960)

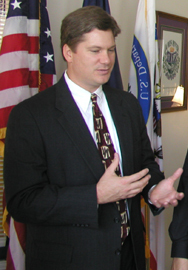

Member of the Virginia House of Delegates from the 68th district
- In office January 9, 2002 – January 11, 2006
- Preceded by: Panny Rhodes
- Succeeded by: Katherine Waddell

Personal details
- Born: Bradley Phipps Marrs; 1960 (age 65–66) Evansville, Indiana, U.S.
- Party: Republican
- Spouse: Elizabeth Gage Koch
- Education: College of William and Mary (BA); University of Virginia (JD)
- Occupation: Lawyer; politician

Bradley Phipps Marrs (born 1960) is an American lawyer and politician who served in the Virginia House of Delegates, representing the 68th district. A conservative member of the Republican Party, he was first elected in 2001 to succeed retiring Republican incumbent Panny Rhodes, despite Rhodes's endorsement of independent candidate John A. Conrad. He won reelection in 2003, but, two years later, independent challenger Katherine Waddell, a socially liberal former Republican, scored an upset victory against Marrs, defeating him by a margin of 42 votes.
