= Cindy Weed =

American politician

Member of the Vermont House of Representatives from the Franklin-7 district
- In office 2012–2019
- Succeeded by: Felisha Leffler

Personal details
- Born: Springfield, Massachusetts
- Party: Progressive
- Children: 3
- Education: CCVT Johnson State College (BA)
- Website: cindyweedforstaterep.com

Cindy Weed is an American politician who served in the Vermont House of Representatives from 2012 to 2019. In May 2022, Weed announced her candidacy for the Vermont House, running again for her former seat in the Franklin-7 district.
