= Katherine Waddell =

American politician (born 1938)

Member of the Virginia House of Delegates from the 68th district
- In office January 11, 2006 – January 9, 2008
- Preceded by: Brad Marrs
- Succeeded by: G. Manoli Loupassi

Personal details
- Born: Hilda Katherine Brooks; June 16, 1938 (age 87) Danville, Virginia, U.S.
- Party: Independent (2001–present); Republican (until 2001)
- Spouse: John Chesleigh Waddell Jr. (m. 1961; died 2023)
- Education: Averett College (ABA)

Katherine Brooks Waddell (born June 16, 1938) is a Virginia politician who served in the Virginia House of Delegates, representing the 68th district, which includes portions of the City of Richmond and Chesterfield County. She was actively involved in Republican politics for a number of years, including stints working for Eddy Dalton, Jim Gilmore, and John H. Hager and serving on the Central Committee of the Republican Party of Virginia. She became disillusioned with the party due to its rightward shift on social issues and resigned from her official positions in the party in 2001 to support the campaign of an independent state house candidate. A strong proponent of abortion rights, she remained on the national board of the Republican Majority for Choice.

Born Hilda Katherine Brooks, she married John Chesleigh Waddell Jr. in Richmond on April 29, 1961.

== Electoral history ==
Date	Election	Candidate	Party	Votes	%
Virginia House of Delegates, 68th district
Nov 8, 2005	General	Katherine B. Waddell	Independent	13,424	49.93
Nov 8, 2005	General	Bradley P. Marrs	Republican	13,382	49.77
Nov 8, 2005	General	Write Ins		80	0.30
Nov 6, 2007	General	G. Manoli Loupassi	Republican	8,549	54.05
Nov 6, 2007	General	Katherine B. Waddell	Independent	6,661	42.12
Nov 6, 2007	General	William K. Grogan	Independent	591	3.73
Nov 6, 2007	General	Write Ins		13	0.08
