= Virginia's 17th House of Delegates district =

Virginia legislative district

Virginia's 17th State House of Delegates district
- District map from the 2023 election
Delegate
Garrett McGuire; D–Fairfax County
- Demographics: 45% White; 17% Black; 17% Hispanic; 15% Asian; 0% Native American; 0% Hawaiian/Pacific Islander; 1% Other; 5% Multiracial
- Population (2024) • Voting age: 86,407; 18
- Registered voters: 61,331

Virginia's 17th House of Delegates district elects one of 100 seats in the Virginia House of Delegates, the lower house of the state's bicameral legislature. District 17 represents parts of Fairfax County. The seat is currently held by Democrat Garrett McGuire.

== District officeholders ==
Years	Delegate	Party	Electoral history
January 12, 1983 – January 14, 2004	A. Victor Thomas	Democratic	Retired
January 14, 2004 – January 13, 2010	William Fralin	Republican	
January 13, 2010 – January 11, 2012	William Cleaveland	Republican	Declined to seek reelection
January 11, 2012 – January 10, 2024	Chris Head	Republican	First elected in 2011. Redistricted to the 37th District. Successfully ran for Senate District 3
January 10, 2020 – January 2026	Mark Sickles	Democratic	Redistricted from the 43rd District
January 2026 – present	Garrett McGuire	Democratic	Elected in special election

== Electoral history ==
Date	Election	Candidate	Party	Votes	%
Virginia House of Delegates, 17th district
Nov 6, 2001	General	A. V. Thomas	Democratic	16,977	100.0
Nov 6, 2001	General	Write Ins		8	0
Nov 4, 2003	General	W H Fralin Jr	Republican	9,890	62.05
Nov 4, 2003	General	L F Wyatt	Democratic	5,072	31.82
Nov 4, 2003	General	G M Bowman		975	6.12
Nov 4, 2003	General	Write Ins		1	0.01
Nov 4, 2003	General	Vic Thomas retired; seat changed from Democratic to Republican			
Nov 8, 2005	General	W H Fralin Jr	Republican	19,049	98.65
Nov 8, 2005	General	Write Ins		261	1.35
Nov 6, 2007	General	William H. Fralin, Jr.	Republican	10,875	75.11
Nov 6, 2007	General	Alexander H. Ballin		3,569	24.65
Nov 6, 2007	General	Write Ins		34	0.23
Jun 9, 2009	Republican primary	Bill H. Cleaveland		893	28.04
Jun 9, 2009	Republican primary	Christopher T. Head		769	24.15
Jun 9, 2009	Republican primary	Michael A. "Mike" Wray		613	19.25
Jun 9, 2009	Republican primary	Josh C. Johnson		549	17.24
Jun 9, 2009	Republican primary	Melvin E. Williams		360	11.30
Nov 3, 2009	General	Bill H. Cleaveland	Republican	14,004	61.96
Nov 3, 2009	General	Gwen W. Mason	Democratic	8,573	37.93
Nov 3, 2009	General	Write Ins		24	0.10
Nov 3, 2009	General	William Fralin retired; seat stayed Republican			
Nov 8, 2011	General	Chris T. Head	Republican	11,852	65.46
Nov 8, 2011	General	Freeda L. Cathcart	Democratic	6,207	34.28
Nov 8, 2011	General	Write-ins		44	0.24
Nov 8, 2011	General	William Cleaveland retired; seat stayed Republican			
Nov 5, 2013	General	Chris T. Head Incumbent	Republican	15,222	62
Nov 5, 2013	General	Freeda L. Cathcart	Democratic	9,262	37.7
Nov 5, 2013	General	Write-ins		68	0.3
Nov 3, 2015	General	Christopher Tracy Head	Republican	15,091	96.5
Nov 3, 2015	General	Write Ins		540	3.5
Nov 7, 2017	General	Christopher Tracy Head	Republican	15,997	60.6
Nov 7, 2017	General	Djuna Lauren Osborne	Democratic	10,378	39.3
Nov 7, 2017	General	Write Ins		39	0.1
Nov 5, 2019	General	Christopher Tracy Head	Republican	15,288	93.5
Nov 5, 2019	General	Write Ins		1,058	6.5
Nov 2, 2021	General	Christopher Tracy Head	Republican	26,102	92.8
Nov 2, 2021	General	Write Ins		2,011	7.2
Nov 7, 2023	General	Mark D. Sickles	Democratic	17,931	92.2
Nov 7, 2023	General	Write Ins		1,521	7.8
