= 2003 Virginia Senate election =

- November 4, 2003

All 40 seats of the Virginia Senate 21 seats needed for a majority
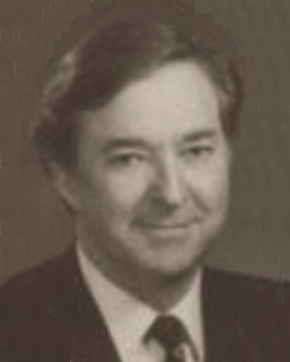

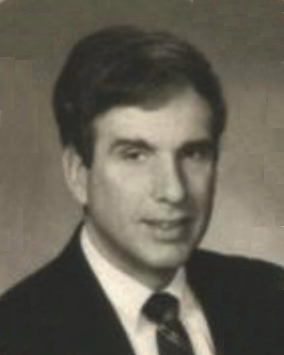
	Majority party	Minority party
Leader	Walter Stosch	Dick Saslaw
Party	Republican	Democratic
Leader since	January 13, 1998	January 10, 1996
Leader's seat	12th	35th
Last election	21	19
Seats before	23 (Note: Republicans gained two seats in special elections.)	17
Seats after	24	16
Seat change	1▲	🔻1
popular vote	615,991	456,236
Percentage	55.77%	41.30%
- Results: Democratic hold Republican hold Republican gain
Majority Leader before election
Walter Stosch
Republican
Elected Majority Leader
Walter Stosch
Republican

The Virginia Senate election of 2003 was held on Tuesday, November 4, to elect the 40 members of the Virginia Senate. In the previous election in 1999, the Republican Party won 21 seats, while the Democratic Party won 19 seats. The general election saw Republicans flip 3 senate seats, maintaining and expanding their control of the Senate majority. 20 of the 40 seats up for election went uncontested by either major party. 38 of the 40 seats had an incumbent who ran and won re-election. No incumbent lost re-election.

== Background ==
In 2001, Governor Jim Gilmore (R), in conjunction with the Virginia House of Delegates and the Virginia Senate, both controlled by Republicans, completed constitutionally required redistricting after the 2000 census was completed. This was the first time in commonwealth history that Republicans controlled the redistricting process in Virginia. This resulted in maps more favorable to the Republican Party in the Virginia Senate, the Virginia House of Delegates, and Virginia's United States Congressional District maps. The 2001 Virginia Gubernatorial election resulted in the victory of Mark Warner, flipping the office to the Democratic Party. Republicans concurrently flipped 12 seats in the 2001 Virginia House of Delegates election, resulting in a near-supermajority of 64% of seats for Republicans, just shy of the two-thirds supermajority needed to override gubernatorial vetoes. Therefore, this election along with the concurrent House of Delegates election would determine if Republicans would be able to override Governor Warner's veto power. If Democrats had a net gain of 1 seat in this election, Lt. Gov Tim Kaine, elected in 2001, would have served as the tie-breaking vote in a hypothetical 20-20 senate.

== Seats Changing Parties ==
1. District 15: Open Seat previously held by Richard Holland, (D), won by Frank Ruff Jr. (R).
2. District 34: Open Seat previously held by Leslie Bryne, (D), won by Jeanne Devolites (R).
3. District 39: Open Seat previously held by Madison Marye, (D), won by Jay O'Brien Jr. (R).

== Closest Races ==
Seats where the margin of victory was under 10%

1. District 34: 5.63% (Gain)
2. District 37: 6.69%
3. District 29: 9.36%

== Results ==
Gains are determined based on the 1999 Virginia Senate election, not special election results in between. This explains why some races have an incumbent and a "gain" tag.

Virginia's 1st Senate District, 2003
Party	Candidate	Votes	%
Republican	Marty Williams (incumbent)	10,261	94.52%
Write-in		595	5.48%
Total votes		10,856	100.00%
Republican hold			

Virginia's 2nd Senate District, 2003
Party	Candidate	Votes	%
Democratic	Mamie Locke (incumbent)	12,784	64.75%
Republican	Phil Bomersheim	4,805	24.34%
Independent	Joyce Hobson	2,116	10.72%
Write-in		105	0.15%
Total votes		19,744	100.00%
Democratic hold			

Virginia's 3rd Senate district, 2003 election
Party	Candidate	Votes	%
Republican	Tommy Norment (incumbent)	21,309	65.53%
Democratic	Mary Minor	11,080	34.07%
Write-in		131	0.40%
Total votes		32,520	100.0
Republican hold			

Virginia's 4th Senate District, 2003
Party	Candidate	Votes	%
Republican	Bill Bolling (incumbent)	27,646	99.44%
Write-in		155	0.56%
Total votes		27,801	100.00%
Republican hold			

Virginia's 5th Senate District, 2003
Party	Candidate	Votes	%
Democratic	Yvonne B. Miller (incumbent)	12,622	97.85%
Write-in		277	2.15%
Total votes		12,899	100.00%
Democratic hold			

Virginia's 6th Senate district, 2003 election
Party	Candidate	Votes	%
Republican	Nick Rerras (incumbent)	15,771	61.70%
Democratic	Andrew A. Protogyrou	9,775	38.24%
Write-in		14	0.05%
Total votes		25,560	100.0
Republican hold			

Virginia's 7th Senate district, 2003 election
Party	Candidate	Votes	%
Republican	Frank Wagner (incumbent*)	12,694	59.02%
Democratic	Clarence A. Holland	8,737	40.62%
Write-in		14	0.05%
Total votes		21,507	100.0
Republican hold			

Virginia's 8th Senate District, 2003
Party	Candidate	Votes	%
Republican	Ken Stolle (incumbent)	13,641	96.88%
Write-in		440	3.12%
Total votes		14,081	100.00%
Republican hold			

Virginia's 9th Senate District, 2003
Party	Candidate	Votes	%
Democratic	Benjamin Lambert (incumbent)	18,747	98.94%
Write-in		201	1.06%
Total votes		18,948	100.00%
Democratic hold			

Virginia's 10th Senate District, 2003
Party	Candidate	Votes	%
Republican	John Watkins (incumbent)	27,637	99.19%
Write-in		226	0.81%
Total votes		27,863	100.00%
Republican hold			

Virginia's 11th Senate District, 2003
Party	Candidate	Votes	%
Republican	Steve Martin (incumbent)	18,702	97.27%
Write-in		524	2.73%
Total votes		19,226	100.00%
Republican hold			

Virginia's 12th Senate District, 2003
Party	Candidate	Votes	%
Republican	Walter Stosch (incumbent)	22,497	98.35%
Write-in		378	1.65%
Total votes		22,875	100.00%
Republican hold			

Virginia's 13th Senate District, 2003
Party	Candidate	Votes	%
Republican	Fred Quayle (incumbent)	22,174	76.44%
Independent	Richard H. Ramsey Sr.	6,735	23.22%
	Write-In	99	0.34%
Total votes		29,008	100.0%
Republican hold			

Virginia's 14th Senate District, 2003
Party	Candidate	Votes	%
Republican	Harry Blevins (incumbent*)	12,878	97.44%
Write-in		338	2.56%
Total votes		13,216	100.00%
Republican hold			

Virginia's 15th Senate district, 2003
Party	Candidate	Votes	%
Republican	Frank Ruff (incumbent*)	27,288	99.82%
	Write-In	50	0.18%
Total votes		27,338	100.0%
Republican gain from Democratic			

Virginia's 16th Senate District, 2003
Party	Candidate	Votes	%
Democratic	Henry L. Marsh (incumbent)	13,901	99.00%
Write-in		141	1.00%
Total votes		14,042	100.00%
Democratic hold			

Virginia's 17th Senate district, 2003 election
Party	Candidate	Votes	%
Democratic	Edd Houck (incumbent)	21,324	59.25%
Republican	Robert G. Stuber	14,640	40.68%
Write-in		27	0.08%
Total votes		35,991	100.0
Democratic hold			

Virginia's 18th Senate district, 2003 election
Party	Candidate	Votes	%
Democratic	L. Louise Lucas (incumbent)	19,409	69.77%
Republican	Walter D Brown, III	8,383	30.13%
Write-in		27	0.10%
Total votes		27,819	100.0
Democratic hold			

Virginia's 19th Senate District, 2003
Party	Candidate	Votes	%
Republican	Charles R. Hawkins (incumbent*)	23,622	99.98%
Write-in		5	0.02%
Total votes		23,627	100.00%
Republican hold			

Virginia's 20th Senate district, 2003 election
Party	Candidate	Votes	%
Democratic	Roscoe Reynolds (incumbent)	27,699	67.76%
Republican	Thomas L Peterson	13,134	32.13%
Write-in		43	0.11%
Total votes		40,876	100.0
Democratic hold			

Virginia's 21st Senate District, 2003
Party	Candidate	Votes	%
Democratic	John S. Edwards (incumbent)	21,349	99.92%
Write-in		18	0.08%
Total votes		21,367	100.00%
Democratic hold			

Virginia's 22nd Senate district, 2003 election
Party	Candidate	Votes	%
Republican	Brandon Bell (incumbent**)	23,810	56.75%
Democratic	Stephen H. Emick	18,140	43.24%
Write-in		6	0.01%
Total votes		41,956	100.0
Republican hold			

Virginia's 23rd Senate district, 2003 election
Party	Candidate	Votes	%
Republican	Stephen Newman (incumbent)	26,446	64.07%
Democratic	Robert E Clarke	14,812	35.88%
Write-in		21	0.05%
Total votes		41,279	100.0
Republican hold			

Virginia's 24th Senate district, 2003 election
Party	Candidate	Votes	%
Republican	Emmett Hanger (incumbent)	25,548	71.74%
Democratic	Steven Sisson	10,028	28.16%
Write-in		36	0.10%
Total votes		35,612	100.0
Republican hold			

Virginia's 25th Senate District, 2003
Party	Candidate	Votes	%
Democratic	Creigh Deeds (incumbent*)	25,015	98.39%
Write-in		410	1.61%
Total votes		25,425	100.00%
Democratic hold			

Virginia's 26th Senate District, 2003
Party	Candidate	Votes	%
Republican	Mark Obenshain	26,771	67.91%
Independent	Rodney L. Eagle	12,457	31.60%
	Write-In	194	0.49%
Total votes		39,422	100.0%
Republican hold			

Virginia's 27th Senate district, 2003 election
Party	Candidate	Votes	%
Republican	Russ Potts (incumbent)	26,152	58.18%
Democratic	Mark Herring	18,460	41.07%
Write-in		335	0.75%
Total votes		44,947	100.0
Republican hold			

Virginia's 28th Senate District, 2003
Party	Candidate	Votes	%
Republican	John Chichester (incumbent*)	23,251	97.99%
Write-in		478	2.01%
Total votes		23,729	100.00%
Republican hold			

Virginia's 29th Senate district, 2003 election
Party	Candidate	Votes	%
Democratic	Charles J. Colgan (incumbent)	16,185	54.68%
Republican	David C Mabie	13,415	45.32%
Write-in		1	0.00%
Total votes		29,601	100.0
Democratic hold			

Virginia's 30th Senate District, 2003
Party	Candidate	Votes	%
Democratic	Patsy Ticer (incumbent*)	18,633	95.38%
Write-in		903	4.62%
Total votes		19,536	100.00%
Democratic hold			

Virginia's 31st Senate district, 2003 election
Party	Candidate	Votes	%
Democratic	Mary Margaret Whipple (incumbent)	23,015	69.39%
Republican	Kamal Nawash	10,053	30.31%
Write-in		100	0.30%
Total votes		33,168	100.0
Democratic hold			

Virginia's 32nd Senate district, 2003 election
Party	Candidate	Votes	%
Democratic	Janet Howell (incumbent)	21,252	56.70%
Republican	David Hunt	16,214	43.26%
Write-in		13	0.03%
Total votes		37,479	100.0
Democratic hold			

Virginia's 33rd Senate District, 2003
Party	Candidate	Votes	%
Republican	William C. Mims (incumbent)	27,818	97.27%
Write-in		780	2.73%
Total votes		28,598	100.00%
Republican hold			

Virginia's 34th Senate district, 2003
Party	Candidate	Votes	%
Republican	Jeannemarie Devolites Davis	22,690	52.75%
Democratic	Ronald F Christian	20,267	47.12%
	Write-In	58	0.13%
Total votes		43,015	100.0%
Republican gain from Democratic			

Virginia's 35th Senate District, 2003
Party	Candidate	Votes	%
Democratic	Dick Saslaw (incumbent)	17,735	82.48%
Independent	C.W. Levy	3,537	16.45%
	Write-In	231	1.07%
Total votes		21,503	100.0%
Democratic hold			

Virginia's 36th Senate district, 2003 election
Party	Candidate	Votes	%
Democratic	Toddy Puller (incumbent*)	16,637	55.42%
Republican	Chris Braunlich	13,373	44.54%
Write-in		12	0.04%
Total votes		30,022	100.0
Democratic hold			

Virginia's 37th Senate district, 2003 election
Party	Candidate	Votes	%
Republican	Ken Cuccinelli (incumbent*)	16,762	53.31%
Democratic	James E Mitchell, III	14,658	46.62%
Write-in		23	0.07%
Total votes		31,443	100.0
Republican hold			

Virginia's 38th Senate District, 2003
Party	Candidate	Votes	%
Democratic	Phillip Puckett (incumbent)	30,255	99.81%
Write-in		57	0.19%
Total votes		30,312	100.00%
Democratic hold			

Virginia's 39th Senate district, 2003
Party	Candidate	Votes	%
Republican	Jay O'Brien (incumbent*)	18,780	57.76%
Democratic	Greg Galligan	13,717	42.19%
	Write-In	19	0.06%
Total votes		32,516	100.0%
Republican gain from Democratic			

Virginia's 40th Senate District, 2003
Party	Candidate	Votes	%
Republican	William C. Wampler Jr. (incumbent)	27,826	99.91%
Write-in		24	0.09%
Total votes		27,850	100.00%
Republican hold			

*Denotes incumbency due to special election victory prior to 2003 election

**Denotes incumbency, however, changed district number in the 2003 election
