= Virginia's 68th House of Delegates district =

Virginia legislative district

District map from the 2023 election

Virginia's 68th House of Delegates district elects one of 100 seats in the Virginia House of Delegates, the lower house of the state's bicameral legislature. District 68, comprising King William County, King & Queen County, Gloucester County, Mathews County, Middlesex County, and Essex County, is represented by Republican M. Keith Hodges.

From 2008 to 2018, the 68th district was represented by Republican Manoli Loupassi from 2008 to 2018. He lost his 2017 reelection bid to Dawn Adams by 325 votes (of more than 40,000 cast). Adams represented the district from 2018 to 2024, and did not seek re-election following redistricting that would have re-aligned her seat to the 78th District.

The 68th district is one of 11 House of Delegates districts that courts found unconstitutionally gerrymandered by race and was redrawn effective August 31, 2023.

== District officeholders ==
Years	Delegate	Party	Electoral history
January 12, 1983 – September 15, 1986	Joseph B. Benedetti	Republican	Elected to Senate
September 15, 1986 – January 10, 1990	E. Hatcher Crenshaw Jr.	Republican	Lost reelection
January 10, 1990 – January 9, 1992	Edgar Eck	Democratic	Did not seek reelection
January 9, 1992 – January 9, 2002	Panny Rhodes	Republican	Did not seek reelection
January 9, 2002 – January 11, 2006	Brad Marrs	Republican	Defeated in bid for reelection
January 11, 2006 – January 9, 2008	Katherine Waddell	Independent	Defeated in bid for reelection
January 9, 2008 – January 10, 2018	G. Manoli Loupassi	Republican	Defeated in bid for reelection
January 10, 2018 – January 10, 2024	Dawn Adams	Democratic	Did not seek re-election after redistricting
January 10, 2024 – Present	Keith Hodges	Republican	Redistricted from 98th District in 2024
