= Wallace Stieffen =

American politician

Member of the Virginia House of Delegates
- In office January 11, 1978 – January 12, 1994
- Preceded by: Robert E. Quinn
- Succeeded by: Vince Behm
- Constituency: 52nd district (1978‍–‍1982); 45th district (1982‍–‍1983); 91st district (1983‍–‍1994)

Personal details
- Born: Spiros Wallace Stieffen; April 29, 1925 Newport News, Virginia, U.S.
- Died: August 20, 2017 (aged 92) Williamsburg, Virginia, U.S.
- Party: Democratic
- Spouse: Jacqueline Canepa (m. 1949)
- Education: Virginia Tech (BS)

Military service
- Branch/service: United States Navy
- Battles/wars: World War II

Spiros Wallace "Wally" Stieffen (April 29, 1925 – August 20, 2017) was an American politician who served as a Democratic member of the Virginia House of Delegates from 1978 until 1994, until declining to seek re-election.
