= Glenn Davis (politician) =

American politician (born 1973)

Member of the Virginia House of Delegates from the 84th district
- In office January 8, 2014 – April 24, 2023
- Preceded by: Sal Iaquinto
- Succeeded by: Nadarius Clark (redistricting)

Member of the Virginia Beach City Council from the Rose Hall district
- In office January 1, 2009 – December 31, 2013
- Preceded by: Reba S. McClanan
- Succeeded by: Shannon Kane

Personal details
- Born: Glenn Ray Davis Jr. October 19, 1973 (age 52) Norfolk, Virginia, U.S.
- Party: Republican
- Spouse: Chelle Davis
- Website: www.glennrdavis.com

Glenn Ray Davis Jr. (born October 19, 1973) is an American politician from Virginia. Davis served as a member of the Republican Party representing the Virginia House of Delegates 84th district. He resigned on April 24, 2023 to serve as director of the Virginia Department of Energy.

== Early life and education ==
Glenn Davis was born and raised in Norfolk, Virginia.

He attended George Mason University 1991 to 1993 and received a B.A. in economics there. He enrolled in the Massachusetts Institute of Technology Masters program from 2007 to 2010 with a concentration in organizational leadership.

== Political career ==
Davis was elected to City of Virginia Beach City Council - Rose Hall District on November 4, 2008 defeating an incumbent first elected 28 years prior. Davis was re-elected to the city council on November 6, 2012.

Davis was elected to the House of Delegates in the November 2013 elections. Davis serves on the Education, Transportation, and General Laws Committees. Davis is also Vice-Chairman of the Joint Commission on Technology and Science (JCOTS) and chaired its Cybersecurity and Blockchain subcommittees. He is also a member of the Business Development, and Virginia Tourism Caucuses.

In March 2016, Davis announced that he was joining the race for Lieutenant Governor of Virginia. Davis began travelling the state of Virginia campaigning on the message of "Make Virginia #1 Again for Business and Job Growth". His platform was on tax reform, easing regulations on small businesses, modernizing education and creating 21st century jobs. During the campaign for Lieutenant Governor Davis traveled to Estonia to help look at bringing technology jobs to Virginia and traveled to Academic Institutions to look at broader uses for Virginia coal. Davis lost the Republican primary for Virginia Lieutenant Governor taking 3rd place on June 13, 2017.

Davis ran again to be re-elected to his delegate seat and won on November 7, 2017.

In September 2019, Davis listed a $44,000 in-kind contribution from the Democratic Party of Virginia on his campaign finance report, which nearly doubled his reported fundraising for the month of September. His campaign stated that "unethical, dishonest" Democratic mailers against him actually backfired and were beneficial. DPVA spokesman Grant Fox called the move a "gimmick."

Davis won his November 5, 2019 re-election.

On September 10, 2020 Davis announced he would again seek the Republican nomination for Lieutenant Governor of Virginia.

In 2022, Davis was promoted to chair of the Education Committee.

== Electoral history ==
Date	Election	Candidate	Party	Votes	%
City Council, Virginia Beach City - Rose Hall
Nov 4, 2008	General	Glenn R. Davis	Independent	78,923	52.86
Nov 4, 2008	General	Reba S. McClanan	Independent	69,992	46.88
Nov 4, 2008	General	Write Ins		378	
Nov 6, 2012	General	Glenn R. Davis	Independent	82,783	57.3
Nov 6, 2012	General	Davis M. McCormick	Independent	60,996	42.2
Nov 6, 2012	General	Write Ins		807	
Virginia 84th District House of Delegates
Nov 5, 2013	General	Glenn R. Davis	Republican	10,101	57.3
Nov 5, 2013	General	Brent M. McKenzie	Democratic	7,476	42.4
Nov 5, 2013	General	Write Ins		38	
Nov 5, 2013	General	Sal Iaquinto did not seek re-election; seat stayed Republican			
Nov 3, 2015	General	Glenn R. Davis	Republican	6,810	93.5
Nov 3, 2015	General	Write Ins		476	
Virginia Lieutenant Governor
June 13, 2017	Primary	Jill H. Vogel	Republican	151,880	42.8
June 13, 2017	Primary	Bryce Reeves	Republican	141,888	40.0
June 13, 2017	Primary	Glenn R. Davis	Republican	60,998	17.2
Virginia 84th District House of Delegates
Nov 7, 2017	General	Glenn R. Davis	Republican	10,819	51.65
Nov 7, 2017	General	Veronica R. Coleman	Democratic	10,080	48.12
Nov 7, 2017	General	Write Ins		48	
Virginia 84th District House of Delegates
Nov 5, 2019	General	Glenn R. Davis	Republican	10,577	51.16
Nov 5, 2019	General	Karen Mallard	Democratic	10,078	48.74
Nov 5, 2019	General	Write Ins		21	

== Awards and recognition ==
In 2014, the Virginia Chamber of Commerce named Glenn "Freshman Legislator of the Year" for his leadership promoting private sector job growth during his first session in the Virginia General Assembly.

In 2015, the Virginia Chamber awarded Glenn their Economic Competitiveness Award and Small Business Advocate Award for his legislation protecting small businesses from costly mandates and helping entrepreneurs attract equity investments.

== Personal life ==
Glenn and his wife, Chelle Davis, live in Virginia Beach and are both active in community and charitable efforts throughout Hampton Roads.
