= Martha Mugler =

American politician (born 1961)

Member of the Virginia House of Delegates from the 91st district
- In office January 8, 2020 – January 12, 2022
- Preceded by: Gordon Helsel
- Succeeded by: Aijalon Cordoza

Personal details
- Born: Martha Vogel; July 23, 1961 (age 65) Hampton, Virginia, U.S.
- Party: Democratic
- Spouse: Ross A. Mugler
- Children: 3
- Education: Radford University (BA)

Martha Mugler (née Vogel; born July 23, 1961) is an American politician from Virginia. She was first elected to the Hampton School Board in 2008 then to the Virginia House of Delegates in 2019. She won the seat vacated by retiring Republican Delegate Gordon Helsel. She represented a district covering a large slice of Hampton, as well as all of the neighboring city of Poquoson. In 2021, she was initially declared the loser to Republican Aijalon "A.C." Cordoza, an information technology specialist. However, due to the closeness of the win, a recount was held. After the recount, Mugler conceded. She was elected to an at large seat on Hampton City Council on November 8, 2022.

== Electoral history ==
Date	Election	Candidate	Party	Votes	%
Virginia House of Delegates, 91st district
June 11, 2019	Primary	Martha Mugler	Democratic	2,576	68.69%
June 11, 2019	Primary	Michael Wade	Democratic	1,174	31.31%
November 5, 2019	General	Martha Mugler	Democratic	11,535	54.74%
November 5, 2019	General	Colleen Holcomb	Republican	9,487	45.02%
November 3, 2021	General	Aijalon Cordoza	Republican	13,741 (prior to recount)	49.4% (prior to recount)
November 3, 2021	General	Martha Mugler	Democratic	13,647 (prior to recount)	49.0% (prior to recount)
November 3, 2021	General	Charles West	Libertarian	417 (prior to recount)	1.5% (prior to recount)

Virginia House of Delegates
Preceded by Martha Mugler	Member of the Virginia House of Delegates from the 51st district 2020–2022	Succeeded by Aijalon Cordoza
