= Dawn Adams =

American politician (born 1964)

Dawn M. Adams

Member of the Virginia House of Delegates from the 68th district
- In office January 10, 2018 – January 10, 2024
- Preceded by: Manoli Loupassi
- Succeeded by: Keith Hodges (redistricting)

Personal details
- Born: November 6, 1964 (age 61) Naval Air Station Pensacola, Florida, U.S.
- Party: Democratic
- Spouse: Margaret "Maggie" J. Constante
- Education: James Madison University (BS); University of Virginia (MS); Old Dominion University (DNP); Virginia Commonwealth University (GradCert)
- Profession: Nurse Practitioner, Small business owner, Former State Health Official, and former adjunct faculty
- Website: www.delegateadams.com

Dawn Marie Adams (born November 6, 1964) is an American politician who served as the Delegate from the 68th District of the Virginia House of Delegates from 2018 to 2024. She is a member of the Democratic Party.

Adams is a nurse practitioner and small business owner as well as a former director of the Office of Integrated Health at the Virginia Department of Behavioral Health and Developmental Services and a former Health Policy adjunct faculty at the Old Dominion University.

As an openly lesbian woman, Adams is the first lesbian elected to the Virginia House of Delegates and the first member of the LGBTQ community elected to the Virginia General Assembly outside of Northern Virginia.

Adams was one of four openly LGBT people serving in the Virginia General Assembly (alongside Adam Ebbin, Mark Sickles, and Danica Roem).

== Political career ==
In 2017, Adams challenged Republican incumbent Manoli Loupassi for the 68th district seat in the House of Delegates, ultimately winning by 336 votes of the 40,000 cast in the district.

Adams is a healthcare and environmental advocate and served as the Health Professions Chair within the Health Welfare and Institutions Committee in 2020 and 2021. Her other committee assignments include General Laws, and Privileges and Elections. In 2020 she was appointed to the Joint Commission on Health Care, the Disability Commission, the Committee on Coal and Energy, and the Joint Subcommittee on Block Grants. In 2021 she was also appointed to the Cannabis Oversight Commission, the Task Force on Maternal Health Data and Quality Measures, and the Human Services & Public Safety Committee of the Southern Legislative Conference (SLC) of The Council of State Governments (CSG). As of 2022, she remains a member of the Joint Commission on Health Care, the Cannabis Oversight Commission, the Task Force on Maternal Health Data and Quality Measures, the Committee on Coal and Energy, the committee for Reproductive Health Service Coverage, the School Health Services Committee, and the Workgroup to Study Policy Proposals for the Expedited Sales of Cannabis. Prior to 2020, her committee assignments include the House Militia, Police and Public Safety, and The House Agriculture, Chesapeake and Natural Resources Committees.

She was reelected over Republican Garrison Coward in the 2019 Virginia House of Delegates election with a majority of 3,568 votes of the 38,000 cast. Adams won at 2021 Virginia House of Delegates election over her opponent receiving 61.95% of the vote over Republican Mark Earley Jr. with a majority of 2,949 votes of the 46,000 votes cast.

== Legislative work ==
=== Healthcare ===
Dr. Adams has more than thirty-five years of diverse clinical, administrative, and healthcare policy experience. From 2014 to 2019, she designed the curriculum and taught Health Policy in the doctoral nursing program at Old Dominion University. She holds four academic degrees from four Virginia universities and is currently a small business owner and clinician specializing in alternative pain management, medical cannabis, and internal medicine.

As a member of the Delegation of 2018, she cast her vote for Virginia Medicaid Expansion, which as of June 2022 has afforded more than 663,000 Virginians healthcare coverage. In the last five sessions, she has both sponsored legislation and/or voted the Virginia Reproductive Health Protection Act, expanded access to birth control, remove the ban on abortion coverage by state health plan insurers, establish the Task Force on Maternal Health Data and Quality Measures, bring down premiums by creating a reinsurance program and to reduce administrative costs — with savings passed on to Virginians — by having Virginia create its own health insurance exchange. Adams has also worked on expanding access to quality care by sponsoring and voting for greater scope of practice for advanced practice nurses, midwives, and other medical professionals where appropriate.

In 2019, Adams apologized to her constituents after receiving criticism for supporting a late-term abortion bill, saying: "I did not fully read a bill I agreed to co-patron and that wasn’t smart or typical. I will work harder and be better for it." The issue was not about abortion, but rather the details of enactment.

== See also ==
- Virginia House of Delegates elections, 2017
- Virginia House of Delegates elections, 2019
- 2021 Virginia House of Delegates election
