= Virgil Thornton Sr. =

American politician from Virginia

Member of the Virginia House of Delegates from the 86th district
- Incumbent
- Assumed office January 14, 2026
- Preceded by: A.C. Cordoza

Personal details
- Party: Democratic
- Website: virgilthorntonsr.com

Virgil Thornton Sr. is an American politician who was elected as a member of the Virginia House of Delegates in 2025. A member of the Democratic Party, he defeated incumbent Republican A.C. Cordoza. He is an executive coach and former Naval submarine technician.

== Political career ==
In the 2025 Virginia House of Delegates election, Thornton was elected in the 86th district by a margin of 7.94%, defeating incumbent AC Cordoza.

== Personal life ==
He and his wife Michelle-Boone Thornton are parents of twin daughters and one son.
