= Steve Heretick =

American politician

Member of the Virginia House of Delegates from the 79th district
- In office January 13, 2016 – January 12, 2022
- Preceded by: Johnny Joannou
- Succeeded by: Nadarius Clark

Member of the Portsmouth City Council
- In office July 1, 2004 – December 31, 2012

Personal details
- Born: Stephen Edward Heretick; May 29, 1960 (age 66) Hopewell, Virginia, U.S.
- Party: Democratic
- Spouse: Stephanie von Schaaf
- Education: College of William & Mary (BA); Villanova University (JD); Hahnemann University (PhD)
- Profession: Attorney
- Website: www.steveheretick.com

Stephen Edward Heretick (born May 29, 1960) is an American politician of the Democratic Party. Heretick represented the 79th district of the Virginia House of Delegates, which includes parts of the cities of Portsmouth and Norfolk, after defeating longtime incumbent Delegate Johnny Joannou in the 2015 Democratic primary. He previously served on the Portsmouth City Council from 2004 to 2012.

Heretick was defeated in the 2021 Democratic primary by Nadarius Clark.

== Electoral history ==
=== 2001 ===
2001 General Election, Portsmouth Commonwealth Attorney
| Party | Candidate | Votes | % | ±% |
|---|---|---|---|---|
| Republican | Earle Mobley | 12,595 | 50.74 | n/a |
| Democratic | Steve Heretick | 12,171 | 49.03 | n/a |
| | Write-in | 57 | 0.23 | n/a |
| Total votes | | 24,823 | 100.00 | n/a |

=== 2007 ===
2007 Primary Election, Virginia Senate 13th District
| Party | Candidate | Votes | % | ±% |
|---|---|---|---|---|
| Democratic | Steve Heretick | 3,060 | 70.15 | n/a |
| Democratic | David W. Bouchard | 1,302 | 29.85 | n/a |
| Total votes | | 4,362 | 100.00 | |

2007 General Election, Virginia Senate 13th District
| Party | Candidate | Votes | % | ±% |
|---|---|---|---|---|
| Republican | Fred Quayle (incumbent) | 21,114 | 58.62 | n/a |
| Democratic | Steve Heretick | 14,821 | 41.15 | n/a |
| | Write-in | 83 | 0.23 | n/a |
| Total votes | | 36,018 | 100.00 | |

=== 2015 ===
2015 Primary Election, Virginia House of Delegates 79th District
| Party | Candidate | Votes | % | ±% |
|---|---|---|---|---|
| Democratic | Steve Heretick | 1,809 | 52.77 | n/a |
| Democratic | Johnny Joannou (incumbent) | 1,619 | 47.23 | n/a |
| Total votes | | 32,407 | 100.00 | |

2015 General Election, Virginia House of Delegates 79th District
| Party | Candidate | Votes | % | ±% |
|---|---|---|---|---|
| Democratic | Steve Heretick | 4,008 | 92.03 | n/a |
| | Write-in | 347 | 7.97 | n/a |
| Total votes | | 32,407 | 100.00 | |
