= Buddy Fowler =

American politician (born 1955)

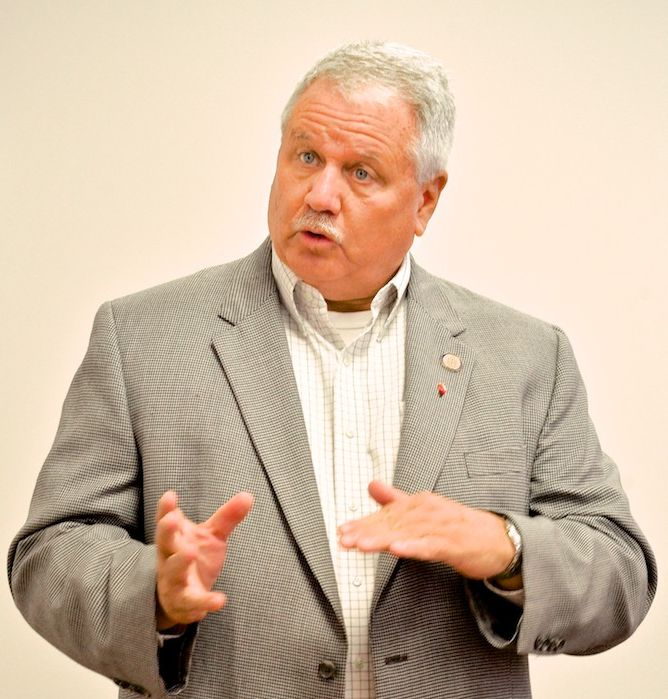
- Fowler in 2016 at Germanna Community College

Member of the Virginia House of Delegates
- Incumbent
- Assumed office January 8, 2014
- Preceded by: John Cox
- Constituency: 55th district (2014–2024); 59th district (2024–present)

Personal details
- Born: Hyland Franklin Fowler Jr. July 2, 1955 (age 71) Richmond, Virginia, U.S.
- Party: Republican
- Spouse: Patsy Lynn Traylor
- Education: Mary Washington College (BA)

Hyland Franklin "Buddy" Fowler Jr. (born July 2, 1955) is an American politician from Virginia. A member of the Republican Party, Fowler is the member of the Virginia House of Delegates for the 59th district, succeeding John Cox.

In 2015, Fowler was criticized by media outlets and fellow members of the Virginia Assembly for sharing a meme on social media that some considered racist.

During the 2019 session of the Virginia General Assembly, Fowler voted to "pass by indefinitely" the Equal Rights Amendment while it was in a House Privileges and Elections sub-committee. This vote prevented the resolution from being considered or voted on by the full committee and effectively ended the resolutions progress through the House of Delegates for the remainder of the session.
