= William Cleaveland =

American politician (born 1950)

Bill Cleaveland

Member of the Virginia House of Delegates from the 17th district
- In office January 13, 2010 – January 11, 2012
- Preceded by: William Fralin
- Succeeded by: Chris Head

Personal details
- Born: William Harrison Cleaveland; December 14, 1950 (age 75) St. Mary's, Pennsylvania
- Party: Republican
- Spouse: Deborah Overstreet
- Education: Alfred University
- Profession: Lawyer
- Committees: Courts of Justice; Militia Police and Public Safety

William Harrison Cleaveland (born December 14, 1950) is an American politician and jurist. He was a Republican member of the Virginia House of Delegates 2010–2012, representing the 17th district, which included parts of Botetourt and Roanoke Counties and the city of Roanoke in the western part of the state. On January 30, 2013, he was sworn in as a judge of the General District Court of Botetourt and Craig Counties.

== Electoral history ==
Before the 2009 elections, longtime delegate William Fralin announced his retirement. Cleaveland won a June 2011 Republican primary against four opponents, then defeated Democrat Gwen Mason in the November general election, 62 to 37 percent.

In 2011, Cleaveland opted not to run for re-election. He was replaced by Chris Head, who had finished second in the 2009 primary.

Date	Election	Candidate	Party	Votes	%
Virginia House of Delegates, 17th district
Jun 9, 2009	Republican primary	Bill H. Cleaveland		893	28.04
Jun 9, 2009	Republican primary	Christopher T. Head		769	24.15
Jun 9, 2009	Republican primary	Michael A. "Mike" Wray		613	19.25
Jun 9, 2009	Republican primary	Josh C. Johnson		549	17.24
Jun 9, 2009	Republican primary	Melvin E. Williams		360	11.30
Nov 3, 2009	General	Bill H. Cleaveland	Republican	14,004	61.96
Nov 3, 2009	General	Gwen W. Mason	Democratic	8,573	37.93
Nov 3, 2009	General	Write Ins		24	0.10
Nov 3, 2009	General	William Fralin retired; seat stayed Republican			
