= Nadarius Clark =

Virginia politician

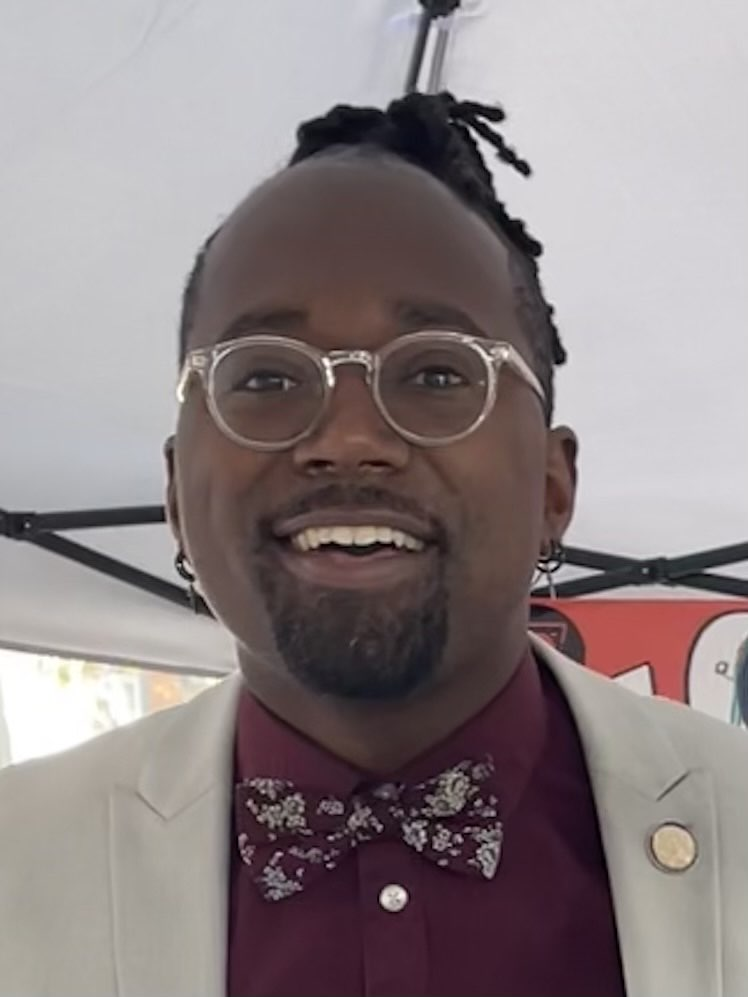

Member of the Virginia House of Delegates
- Incumbent
- Assumed office January 10, 2024
- Preceded by: Glenn Davis (redistricting)
- Constituency: 84th district
- In office January 12, 2022 – March 28, 2023
- Preceded by: Steve Heretick
- Succeeded by: Rae Cousins (redistricting)
- Constituency: 79th district

Personal details
- Born: May 23, 1995 (age 31) Norfolk, Virginia, U.S.
- Party: Democratic
- Education: Virginia Union University

Nadarius Emmanuel Clark (born May 23, 1995) is an American activist and politician who has served as delegate for the 84th district of the Virginia House of Delegates since 2023, and formerly the 79th district from 2022 to 2023. Clark, a Democrat, defeated incumbent Steve Heretick in the Democratic primary and Republican nominee Lawrence Mason in the 2021 Virginia House of Delegates election.

He resigned on March 28, 2023, to run for election to a different seat in the chamber. On June 20, 2023, Clark won the Democratic primary for the new 84th district. He won the election with 53% of the vote to his Republican opponent's 47% Michael Dillender in Virginia's 84th House of Delegates district.

== Early life ==
Nadarius Clark attended Virginia Union University for college, in Richmond.

== Political career ==
=== Virginia House of Delegates ===
Nadarius Clark is a Democratic politician and activist from Virginia who, at a young age, has held multiple terms in the Virginia House of Delegates. He worked as a campaign organizer for Tim Kaine from when he was governor. Clark became the youngest ever representative at 26 years old, the minimum age to be a representative is 21 years old.

Clark first won election in 2021 to represent Virginia's 79th House of Delegates district, defeating incumbent Steve Heretick in the Democratic primary and later the Republican challenger in the general election.

In 2023, following redistricting, Clark resigned from his seat and sought election in the 84th House District. In June 2023, he won the Democratic primary for the seat, and won the general election later that year, securing about 53% of the vote. Clark has continued served as the delegate for District 84 since.

=== Committee assignments ===
During his tenure, Clark has held committee assignments including Agriculture Chesapeake & Natural Resources, Communications, Education, Technology & Innovation, and Public Safety. He is the vice chair for the Agriculture Chesapeake & Natural Resources Committee, and the chair for the Public Safety - Firearms subcommittee.

== Policy positions and legislation ==
In the 2024 session, Clark introduced a bill that would prohibit the collection of medical debt if collection proceedings didn't start within 3 years of the due date on the final notice.

In 2024, Clark introduced a bill to cap rising rents which ultimately didn't advance.

In the 2025 session, Clark had multiple bills signed into law, including one to establish bleeding control programs, requiring schools to have and maintain bleeding control kits, with certain contents such as bandages and tourniquets. He also introduced a bill to limit the ability of third parties to file malpractice claims against another person's lawyer, which also became law. Another passed bill allows businesses in localities with higher unemployment and poverty to qualify for investment grants under more flexible requirements.

== Electoral history ==
=== 2021 elections ===
Democratic primary results
Party	Candidate	Votes	%
Democratic	Nadarius Clark	2,033	45.73
Democratic	Steve Heretick (incumbent)	1,883	42.35
Democratic	Dante Walston	530	11.92
Total votes		4,446	100.0

Virginia's 79th House of Delegates district, 2021
Party	Candidate	Votes	%
Democratic	Nadarius Clark	10,647	56.1
Republican	Lawrence Mason	8,283	43.6
Write-in		63	0.3
Total votes		18,993	100.0
Democratic hold			

=== 2023 election ===
Virginia's 84th House of Delegates District, 2023 General Election
Party	Candidate	Votes	%
Democratic	Nadarius Clark	15,899	52.99
Republican	Michael Dillender	14,046	46.82
Write-in		58	0.19
Total votes		30,003	100
Democratic gain from Republican			

=== 2025 election ===
Virginia's 84th House of Delegates District, 2025 General Election
Party	Candidate	Votes	%
Democratic	Nadarius Clark	23,034	60.19
Republican	Felisha Storm	15,192	39.70
Write-in		44	0.11
Total votes		38,270	100
Democratic hold			
