= John Cox (Virginia politician) =

American politician (1944–2025)

John A. Cox

Member of the Virginia House of Delegates from the 55th district
- In office January 2010 – 2014
- Preceded by: Frank D. Hargrove
- Succeeded by: Buddy Fowler

Personal details
- Born: October 13, 1944 Wilmington, North Carolina, U.S.
- Died: August 28, 2025 (aged 80) Ashland, Virginia, U.S.
- Party: Republican
- Spouse: Dorothy Mae Compton Cox
- Occupation: Executive
- Committees: Militia Police and Public Safety, Privileges and Elections, Transportation

John Cox (October 13, 1944 – August 28, 2025) was an American politician who was a Republican member of the Virginia House of Delegates. He represented the 55th district, which included part of Hanover County.

== Electoral history ==
Cox ran in the 2009 election for the Virginia House of Delegates in the 55th district, with the aim of replacing retiring delegate Frank Hargrove. In a three-way primary, Cox narrowly defeated Rusty McGuire by 232 votes. In the general election, Cox defeated Democrat Robert Barnette by a margin of almost fifty points.

He ran unopposed in 2011.

Cox announced that he would not run for reelection in 2013.

== Death ==
Cox died in Ashland, Virginia on August 28, 2025, at the age of 80.
