= Virginia Peninsula Community College =

Public community college in Virginia, U.S.

- Type: Public community college
- Established: 1968; 58 years ago
- Parent institution: Virginia Community College System
- President: Towuanna Porter Brannon
- Students: 8,676 (2022-2023)
- Location: Williamsburg & Hampton, Virginia, United States; 37.0636°N 76.4194°W
- Campus: Urban
- Colors: Purple, Green & White
- Nickname: Gators
- Sporting affiliations: NJCAA Region 10
- Mascot: Gillie the Gator
- Website: www.vpcc.edu

Virginia Peninsula Community College (VPCC) is a public community college with two campuses in Virginia, one in Hampton and the other in James City County. It also has two education centers The Southeast Higher Education Center in Newport News and the Williamsburg Discovery Center in Williamsburg. It is part of the Virginia Community College System. It mostly serves students living on the Peninsula region of Hampton Roads, but it also has students from other parts of southeastern Virginia.

The college adopted its current name in July 2022, having formerly been known as Thomas Nelson Community College (TNCC) since its inception. The decision to rename the college was approved by the Virginia State Board for Community Colleges in September 2021.

== History ==
The college was originally named after Thomas Nelson, Jr. (December 26, 1738 – January 4, 1789), who was an American planter, soldier, and statesman from Yorktown, Virginia. He is regarded as one of the U.S. Founding Fathers, since he signed the Declaration of Independence as a member of the Virginia delegation. He served as Governor of Virginia in 1781. Nelson County, Virginia, and Nelson County, Kentucky, are also named in his honor.

Former logo of Thomas Nelson Community College prior to its name change in July 2022.

The construction of VPCC began in August 1967. Four buildings were planned for construction, and the cornerstone was laid in December 1967. More than 1,200 Students began classes on September 20, 1968, and the first class of students graduated with associate degrees on June 13, 1970.

In 2014, the school faced a lawsuit from student Christian Parks related to the right to speak freely in public on campus at a conversational level on certain topics. The lawsuit cited 41 violations in the school's policy. In a rare degree of unity, both the ACLU and the ACLJ supported the lawsuit.

In summer 2020 the Virginia State Board for Community Colleges approached multiple colleges and recommended that they review their names to determine if they were appropriate and inclusive. The following year the college's Local Advisory Board determined that the name needed to be changed, as Thomas Nelson, Jr. was a slaveholder. In September 2021 the name Virginia Peninsula Community College was recommended as a replacement for Thomas Nelson Community College; it was approved by the State Board later that same month. Two buildings on the campus, Griffin and Wythe, will be renamed as they were named after associates of Nelson. The decision was made to not rename three other buildings with similar names as, at the time, they were due to be demolished and replaced. This decision marked Thomas Nelson as the fourth such institution to rename themselves during 2021.

== Academics ==
VPCC offers 50 associate degree programs and has over 60 certificate programs.

== Athletics ==
Virginia Peninsula Community College competes in the Carolinas Junior College Conference of the NJCAA's Division III. Sports offered include baseball, men and women's basketball, beach volleyball, softball as well as intramural sports such as flag football and basketball.

== Notable alumni ==
- Gordon Helsel, former member of the Virginia House of Delegates and former mayor of Poquoson, Virginia
- Jess Kersey, former basketball referee in American Basketball Association (ABA) and National Basketball Association (NBA)
- Jeion Ward, member of the Virginia House of Delegates
