= Sal Iaquinto =

American politician (born 1968)

Member of the Virginia House of Delegates from the 84th district
- In office January 11, 2006 – July 1, 2013
- Preceded by: Bob McDonnell
- Succeeded by: Glenn R. Davis, Jr.

Personal details
- Born: Salvatore Robert Iaquinto; March 1, 1968 (age 58) Manhasset, New York, U.S.
- Party: Republican
- Spouse: Stephanie Jane Tomlinson
- Children: 4
- Education: University of Tennessee (BA); Regent University (JD)
- Profession: Circuit Court Judge

Salvatore Robert Iaquinto (born March 1, 1968) is a Virginia Circuit Court Judge and former politician. From 2006–2013 he served in the Virginia House of Delegates, representing the 84th district in Virginia Beach. He is a member of the Republican Party.

Iaquinto announced that he would not run for reelection in 2013. On May 31, 2013, he was given an interim appointment as a judge of the Virginia Beach General District Court, effective July 1. Iaquinto said he would resign from the House, effective on the date of his swearing-in. Iaquinto was appointed to the Virginia Beach Circuit Court effective April 1, 2024.
