= Panny Rhodes =

American politician and civic activist

Member of the Virginia House of Delegates for the 68th district, which includes portions of Henrico County and the City of Richmond
- In office Jan. 8, 1992 – Jan. 2002
- Preceded by: Ed Eck
- Succeeded by: Brad Marrs

Personal details
- Born: Anne Gregory; July 30, 1942 Durham, North Carolina
- Died: October 5, 2023 (aged 81) Richmond, Henrico County, Virginia.
- Party: Republican
- Spouse: James T. Rhodes Jr.
- Children: son and daughter
- Education: Duke University (B.A. 1963)
- Profession: housewife

Anne Gregory Rhodes (July 30, 1942– October 5, 2023) was a civic activist and Republican politician who for a decade represented parts of Richmond, Virginia and surrounding Henrico County in the Virginia House of Delegates, until redistricting by fellow Republicans caused her retirement in 2001.

== Early and family life ==
Born in Durham, North Carolina to the former Elizabeth Anne Jackson of Hopkinsville, Kentucky, and her Durham native husband Nathaniel Alexander Gregory, Gregory (nicknamed "Panny" since her childhood) attended Durham Academy and Durham High School before her parents moved the family to Richmond, Virginia in 1958. There, she attended St. Catherine's school, graduating in 1960 (and was named a distinguished alumna in 2015). Gregory then returned to North Carolina to attend Duke University, graduating in 1963 as an Angier B. Duke Scholar with an A.B. degree in mathematics. In 1965 she married James T. Rhodes, who became Chairman of Virginia Power Company as discussed below. During their nearly four decade marriage, they raised a son and daughter, each named after a parent.

== Career ==
After graduating from Duke, Rhodes worked for Martin Marietta and other defense industry firms in Baltimore, Maryland until her marriage to James T. Rhodes Jr. They lived in Lafayette, Indiana while he completed his degree at Purdue University. Her husband, a nuclear engineer, then took a position with Richmond-based Virginia Power, eventually rising to become its chairman. He announced his retirement in 1997, after what some labeled a boardroom power struggle with the company's parent, Dominion Resources.

Meanwhile, in addition to raising their children, Rhodes became a civic activist in Richmond, working on behalf of Virginia Commonwealth University, J. Sargeant Reynolds Community College, the Girl Scouts, YMCA, American Red Cross and St. Stephen's Episcopal Church, among other organizations. Leadership positions included with United Way Services (becoming chair of the board of trustees), the Richmond Community Services Board (including as chair), Leadership Metro Richmond (board member), Greater Richmond Community Foundation (board member), the Junior League of Richmond (board member), the Metropolitan Business Foundation, Metro YMCA, and Elk Hill Farms.

Named the "outstanding woman of Richmond" in 1990, after redistricting following the 1990 federal census, Rhodes declared herself as a Republican and candidate for the redrawn 68th district seat in the Virginia House of Delegates. She defeated real estate developers and former delegates E. Hatcher Crenshaw and Ed Eck, and was re-elected four times (after later redistricting the district now encompasses areas to the east in Tidewater Virginia). Rhodes became known for advocacy of women's issues, health care and education. The Virginia Interfaith Council named Rhodes legislator of the year in 1998, and in 1999 the Virginia PTA named her Child Advocate of the year, which enabled her to win the 1999 Republican primary despite Republican governor Jim Gilmore, Attorney General Mark Earley and Congressman Tom Bliley all endorsing her opponent. However, redistricting by fellow Republicans following the 2000 census led Rhodes to announce her retirement, and conservative Brad Marrs succeeded to the seat for two terms, despite Rhodes' endorsement of Independent John A. Conrad. Following her legislative service, Rhodes served on the boards of visitors for Virginia Commonwealth University (including as rector 2009–2011) and the Library of Virginia.

== Death and legacy ==
In her final years, Rhodes lived at the Westminster Canterbury facility. She died on October 5, 2023, after suffering multiple strokes. She was survived by her husband, son, daughter and five grandchildren.
