= G. Manoli Loupassi =

American politician (born 1967)

Manoli Loupassi

Member of the Virginia House of Delegates from the 68th district
- In office January 9, 2008 – January 10, 2018
- Preceded by: Katherine Waddell
- Succeeded by: Dawn Adams

Personal details
- Born: June 8, 1967 (age 59) Richmond, Virginia, U.S.
- Party: Republican
- Spouse: Rebecca Hyde Stewart
- Children: 3
- Education: Washington and Lee University; University of Richmond School of Law
- Profession: Lawyer
- Committees: Courts of Justice; Education; Transportation

George Manoli Loupassi (born June 8, 1967, in Richmond, Virginia) is an American politician of the Republican Party. From 2008 to 2017, he was a member of the Virginia House of Delegates. He represented the 68th district, comprising parts of the city of Richmond and Chesterfield County.

== Political career ==
Loupassi became treasurer of the Richmond Republican Committee in 1998. He was elected to the Richmond City Council in 2000 representing the 1st district in the city's West End. Prior to 2005 the Mayor of Richmond was the City Council's chair, chosen by its members. In that year, the city switched to a directly elected at-large mayor, choosing Douglas Wilder. The Council chair became known as the President of the City Council, and the Council chose Loupassi.

On November 6, 2007, Loupassi defeated independent incumbent Katherine Waddell and was elected to a seat in the Virginia House of Delegates representing portions of Chesterfield County and the City of Richmond.

On February 9, 2009, Delegate Loupassi voted against SB 1105, known as the Indoor Clean Air Act (prohibits smoking in all indoor restaurants and bar and lounge areas in State). The bill was passed with a vote of 59 Y – 39 N.

=== 2007 election results ===
Virginia House of Delegates - 68th District
Party	Candidate	Votes	%	±%
Republican	G. Manoli Loupassi	8,549	54.05%	
Independent	Katherine Waddell	6,661	42.12%	
Independent	Bill Grogan	591	3.73%	
Independent	Write-Ins	13	0.08%	
Majority		1888	11.93%	
Turnout		15,814	33.23%	
Republican gain from Independent		Swing		

=== 2017 election results ===
Virginia House of Delegates - 68th District
Party	Candidate	Votes	%	±%
Republican	G. Manoli Loupassi	19,425	49.52%	
Democratic	Dawn M. Adams	19,761	50.37%	
Independent	Write-Ins	42	.11%	
