= Frank Hargrove =

American politician (1927–2021)

Member of the Virginia House of Delegates
- In office January 12, 1983 – January 13, 2010 Serving with Bill Axselle, Robert B. Ball, and Robison James until 1983
- Preceded by: Wayne O'Bryan
- Succeeded by: John Cox
- Constituency: 32nd district (1982–1983); 55th district (1983–2010)

Personal details
- Born: Frank DuVal Hargrove; January 26, 1927 Elmont, Virginia, U.S.
- Died: October 16, 2021 (aged 94) Hanover County, Virginia, U.S.
- Party: Republican
- Spouse: Oriana Robertson
- Children: 4
- Education: Virginia Tech (BS)
- Occupation: Insurance

Military service
- Branch/service: United States Army; Army Air Forces
- Years of service: 1943–1945
- Battles/wars: World War II

Frank DuVal Hargrove Sr. (January 26, 1927 – October 16, 2021) was an American politician. From 1982 to 2010 he served in the Virginia House of Delegates, representing the 55th district in the northeast suburbs of Richmond, in and around Hanover County.

On January 26, 2009, Hargrove announced that he would not run for reelection.

== Death penalty ==
Hargrove supported expansion of the death penalty early in his career. Beginning in 2001, he began introducing annual bills to abolish or restrict the death penalty, saying that life without parole was a sufficient and cheaper alternative.
