= Tom Gear =

American politician (1949–2018)

Member of the Virginia House of Delegates from the 91st district
- In office 2002–2010
- Preceded by: Phil Larrabee
- Succeeded by: Gordon C. Helsel, Jr.

Personal details
- Born: May 2, 1949 Hampton, Virginia, U.S.
- Died: June 13, 2018 (aged 69) York County, Virginia, U.S.
- Party: Republican
- Spouse: Janice Graham Sigler
- Children: Ryan, Shannon
- Occupation: Real estate, printer
- Committees: Education; Finance; General Laws; Transportation

Military service
- Branch/service: United States Army
- Years of service: 1968–1974
- Unit: Virginia Army National Guard

Thomas Donald Gear (May 2, 1949 – June 13, 2018) was an American politician of the Republican Party. He was a member of the Virginia House of Delegates from 2002 until 2010. He represented the 91st district on the Virginia Peninsula, made up of the city of Poquoson plus parts of York County and the city of Hampton. He resigned his seat on December 31, 2010 citing health problems.

== Background ==
Gear was born in Hampton, Virginia and graduated from Kecoughtan High School in Hampton, Virginia. He served in the Virginia National Guard from 1968 to 1974. Gear was a commercial printer and was also in the real estate business. He served on Hampton City Council from 1998 to 2001.

== Elections ==
=== 2005 ===
Gear was re-elected in the November 6, 2005 General Election with 11,057 (59.43%) votes, versus 7,419 (39.88%) votes for Independent candidate Randy A. Gilliland, with 128 voters casting write in votes. Voter turnout was 47.69%.

=== 2007 ===
Gear was re-elected in the November 6, 2007 General Election with 9,156 (93.15%) votes, with 673 voters casting write in votes. Voter turnout was 24.06%.

=== 2009 ===
Gear was up for re-election in a three way race with Independent Gordon C. Helsel, Jr. the then-current Mayor of the City of Poquoson, Virginia. and Democrat Samuel L. Sam Eure, Jr. (a Social Studies Teacher in the York County School Division) of York County, Virginia, As of August 31, 2009 the State Board of Elections website reported that Gear had raised $25,976.00, Helsel had raised $65,261.00, and Eure had raised $5,076.00. Helsel has run on the Republican ticket in the past, but did not secure the Republican nomination for this election.

Republican Gear captured 9,576 votes (48 percent). Independent Helsel finished in second with 6,463 votes (about 33 percent). Democrat Eure finished third in the race with 3,757 votes (19 percent).

== Controversies ==
=== Teddy Thompson controversy ===
Tom Gear sponsored and fought for legislation giving Teddy P. Thompson $270,000 for spending seven years in prison for a robbery he did not commit. Since the legislation passed, Thompson has committed three misdemeanors, including two assault charges and a breach of peace count, and on August 17, 2009 Thompson faced revocation of a suspended sentence on an older robbery charge, for which he received a suspended sentence.

=== Hampton judicial appointment controversy ===
In the 2007 session, Virginia General Assembly members representing Hampton reached a tentative deal to fill nominations for several Hampton judgeships that have been vacant for six years. Gear's insistence that his sister, Kathy Gear Owens, an attorney and substitute judge, be appointment to Hampton's Juvenile and Domestic Relations Court was one of several issues raised by Gear to hold up the appointment of the judges. Because the tentative deal included the appointment of his sister, Gear's fellow Senate Republicans walked off the floor in protest when the selections came up for a vote. Several Democrats also voted against the resolution. During the 2009 General Assembly Session Gear Owens finally removed her name from consideration.

=== Embezzlement from American Legion Auxiliary Post 48 ===
In December 2019, Gear's elderly mother was indicted for embezzlement of more than $180,000 over a three-year stretch from an American Legion Women’s Auxiliary in Hampton, where she had been treasurer for more than four decades. According to media reports, Gear's brother Donald alleged that the money had been used to cover Tom Gear's gambling debts and losses from trading stocks on margin. Donald Gear further said that his brother had convinced his mother to take a reverse mortgage on her $540,000 home, eventually leaving her destitute. Tom Gear allegedly told his mother that he needed the money to pay for medical expenses.

== Death ==
On June 13, 2018 Gear was found dead by suicide in his automobile in York County, Virginia.
