= Virginia's 91st House of Delegates district =

Virginia legislative district

District map from the 2023 election

Virginia's 91st House of Delegates district elects one of the 100 members of the Virginia House of Delegates, the lower house of the state's bicameral legislature. Located in southern, coastal Virginia, the district is made up of the city of Poquoson, part of the city of Hampton and part of York County. Following the 2023 House of Delegates election, the 91st district will instead include sections of the independent cities of Portsmouth and Chesapeake.

The seat has been held by Republican A.C. Cordoza since 2022.

== Electoral history ==
=== 2019 ===
In the November 2019 election, Democrat Martha Mugler won the open seat, following Gordon Helsel’s retirement.

=== 2021 ===
In the 2021 Virginia House of Delegates election, Republican A. C. Cordoza narrowly defeated incumbent Martha Mugler by a margin of 64 votes following a recount.

== District officeholders ==
Years	Delegate	Party	Electoral history
January 12, 1983 – January 12, 1994	Wallace Stieffen	Democratic	Did not seek reelection
January 12, 1994 – January 12, 2000	Vince Behm	Democratic	Did not seek reelection
January 12, 2000 – January 9, 2002	Phil Larrabee	Republican	Defeated in primary
January 9, 2002 – December 31, 2010	Tom Gear	Republican	Resigned
March 9, 2011 – January 8, 2020	Gordon Helsel	Republican	Did not seek reelection
January 8, 2020 – January 12, 2022	Martha Mugler	Democratic	Defeated in general election
January 12, 2022 – present	A.C. Cordoza	Republican	
