= Virginia's 79th House of Delegates district =

Virginia legislative district

District map from the 2023 election

Virginia's 79th House of Delegates district is one of 100 seats in the Virginia House of Delegates, the lower house of the state's bicameral legislature. District 79 represents parts of the city of Richmond. The seat is currently held by Rae Cousins. It was vacant following the resignation of Nadarius Clark, who ran for a different seat in the 2023 elections.

== District officeholders ==
Years	Delegate	Party	Electoral history
January 12, 1983 – January 13, 1984	Johnny Joannou	Democratic	Won election to Senate
January 13, 1984 – January 14, 1998	William S. Moore Jr.	Democratic	
January 14, 1998 – January 13, 2016	Johnny Joannou	Democratic	Lost Democratic Primary to Steve Heretick on June 9, 2015.
January 13, 2016 – January 12, 2022	Steve Heretick	Democratic	Lost Democratic Primary to Nadarius Clark on June 8, 2021.
January 12, 2022 – March 28, 2023	Nadarius Clark	Democratic	Resigned to run for another seat
