= Gordon Helsel =

American politician (born 1947)

Member of the Virginia House of Delegates from the 91st district
- In office March 9, 2011 – January 8, 2020
- Preceded by: Thomas D. Gear
- Succeeded by: Martha Mugler

Mayor of Poquoson, Virginia
- In office 1996–2011
- Preceded by: Cornell Burcher
- Succeeded by: Gene Hunt

Personal details
- Born: Gordon Clair Helsel, Jr. January 9, 1947 (age 79) Hampton, Virginia, U.S.
- Party: Republican
- Spouse: Joyce Ann Rasnick
- Education: Thomas Nelson Community College
- Committees: Health Welfare and Institutions; Science and Technology
- Website: www.gordonhelsel.com

Military service
- Allegiance: United States
- Branch/service: United States Army
- Years of service: 1966–1971
- Battles/wars: Vietnam War
- Awards: Bronze Star Medal; Purple Heart (2)

Gordon Clair Helsel, Jr. (born January 9, 1947) is a former member of the Virginia House of Delegates and former mayor of Poquoson, Virginia. He represented the 91st district, which includes Poquoson and part of the neighboring city of Hampton. A retired businessman, Helsel previously served on the city council (1982–1990), as vice mayor (1990–1994), and as mayor (1996–2010, 2020-2024) of Poquoson.

== Legislative positions ==
While serving as a member of the House of Delegates, Helsel's voting record angered many conservative Republicans, including his vote to expand Medicaid in Virginia, and his vote to defeat the "Tebow Bill". He retired in 2019 to return home and run for Mayor of the City of Poquoson.
