= Mark Sickles =

American politician

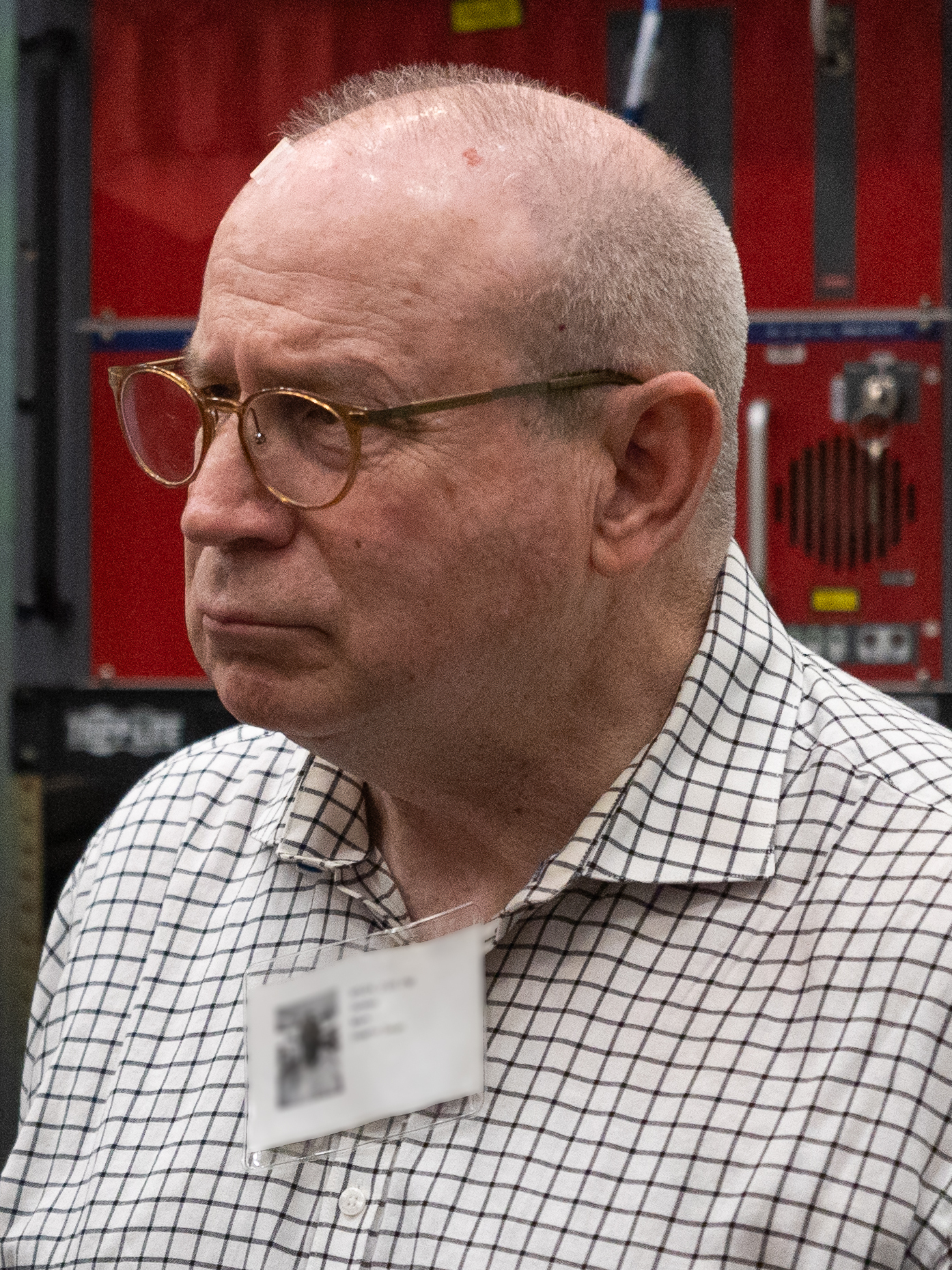
- Sickles in 2024

17th Virginia Secretary of Finance
- Incumbent
- Assumed office January 17, 2026
- Governor: Abigail Spanberger
- Preceded by: Stephen E. Cummings

Member of the Virginia House of Delegates
- In office January 14, 2004 – January 17, 2026
- Preceded by: Thomas M. Bolvin
- Succeeded by: Garrett McGuire
- Constituency: 43rd district (2004–2024); 17th district (2024–2026)

Personal details
- Born: February 18, 1957 (age 69) Arlington County, Virginia, U.S.
- Party: Democratic
- Education: Clemson University; Georgia Institute of Technology
- Occupation: Public affairs
- Committees: Appropriations; Health, Welfare and Institutions; Privileges and Elections; Rules
- Website: www.marksickles.com

Mark D. Sickles (born February 18, 1957) is an American politician serving as the 17th Virginia Secretary of Finance since 2026.

Prior to his appointment, he served as the Delegate from the 17th District of the Virginia House of Delegates from 2024 to 2026. Previously, he represented the 43rd from 2004 to 2024. He served a total of 22 years in the House. He is a member of the Democratic Party.

During his tenure in the House of Delegates, Sickles served as the Chair of the Health, Welfare and Institutions Committee, Vice Chair of the Appropriations Committee and as a member in the Privileges and Elections and Rules Committee.

As an openly gay man, Sickles is the second LGBT person elected to the Virginia House of Delegates and the Virginia General Assembly (after Adam Ebbin).

Sickles was one of six openly LGBT people serving in the Virginia General Assembly (alongside Adam Ebbin, Mark Levine, Dawn Adams, Rozia Henson and Danica Roem).

In 2026, Sickles resigned from the House to join Governor Abigail Spanberger's cabinet as the Secretary of Finance, triggering a special election.

== Early life and education ==
Sickles was born in Arlington, Virginia. He received a Bachelor of Science degree in Forest Management from Clemson University in 1981, a Master of Science in industrial management from Georgia Tech in 1984, and a second M.S. in Technology and Science Policy two years later.

Sickles is a fellow with the Sorensen Institute for Political Leadership at the University of Virginia.

== Legislative issues and bills ==
Tragedy struck in Fairfax County in 2018 when a nine-year-old boy was killed by a motorized classroom partition. In response, Sickles drafted legislation prohibiting anyone from operating a motorized partition when students are in a room at school unless the wall has a safety sensor installed with it. He named the bill the Wesley Charles Lipicky Act in honor of the victim. The bill passed the legislature and was signed into law in May 2019.

Sickles was instrumental in the effort to advance the Equal Rights Amendment (ERA) in Virginia in early 2019. As the only two Democrats on the Subcommittee No. 1 of the House Privileges and Elections Committee, Mark Sickles and Schuyler VanValkenburg (D-) supported the effort make Virginia the 38th state to ratify the ERA. However, the Republicans on Subcommittee No. 1 all voted against the bills.

Later, Sickles tried to bring one of the bills before the full committee, but the motion failed on another party-line vote. Still, Sickles was commended for his efforts by Ratify, a leading organization working to pass the Equal Rights Amendment.

== Personal life ==
In an op-ed for The Washington Post, which noted the striking-down in the U.S. District Court for the Eastern District of Virginia of the constitutionality of the state's ban on same-sex marriage, Sickles publicly came out as gay. This made him the second openly LGBT member of the Virginia General Assembly, alongside Sen. Adam Ebbin, who was out before his election to the House in 2003.

== Electoral history ==
In 2001, Sickles ran for the House and lost by 313 votes to freshman Republican Tom Bolvin, who had defeated 11-term Democrat Gladys Keating two years earlier. Sickles had been a volunteer staffer for Keating previously.

Sickles defeated Bolvin in a 2003 rematch, 53.8%-46.1%.

Date	Election	Candidate	Party	Votes	%
Virginia House of Delegates, 43rd district
Nov 6, 2001	General	Tom Bolvin	Republican	9,550	50.80
Nov 6, 2001	General	Mark D. Sickles	Democratic	9,237	49.14
Nov 6, 2001	General	Write Ins		12	0.06
Nov 6, 2001	General	Incumbent won; seat stayed Republican			
Nov 4, 2003	General	Mark Sickles	Democratic	7,159	53.79
Nov 4, 2003	General	Tom Bolvin	Republican	6,137	46.12
Nov 4, 2003	General	Write Ins		12	0.09
Nov 4, 2003	General	Incumbent lost; seat switched from Republican to Democratic			
Nov 8, 2005	General	Mark D. Sickles	Democratic	11,630	63.82
Nov 8, 2005	General	Ronald Grignol	Republican	6,571	36.06
Nov 8, 2005	General	Write Ins		23	0.13
Nov 6, 2007	General	Mark D. Sickles	Democratic	9,822	97.05
Nov 6, 2007	General	Write Ins		298	2.94
Nov 3, 2009	General	Mark D. Sickles	Democratic	10,363	56.13
Nov 3, 2009	General	Tim D. Nank	Republican	8,081	43.77
Nov 3, 2009	General	Write Ins		17	0.09
Nov 8, 2011	General	Mark D. Sickles	Democratic	10,175	95.80
Nov 8, 2011	General	Write Ins		446	4.19
Nov 5, 2013	General	Mark D. Sickles	Democratic	14,799	73.47
Nov 5, 2013	General	Gail Parker	Independent Green	5,090	25.27
Nov 5, 2013	General	Write Ins		252	1.25
Nov 3, 2015	General	Mark D. Sickles	Democratic	7,696	63.25
Nov 3, 2015	General	Anna Urman	Republican	4,058	33.35
Nov 3, 2015	General	Paul McIlvaine	Independent	398	3.27
Nov 3, 2015	General	Write Ins		14	0.12
Nov 7, 2017	General	Mark D. Sickles	Democratic	22,094	93.34
Nov 7, 2017	General	Write Ins		1,576	6.65
Nov 5, 2019	General	Mark D. Sickles	Democratic	15,939	77.8
Nov 5, 2019	General	Gail Parker	Independent	4,217	20.59
Nov 5, 2019	General	Write Ins		330	1.61
Nov 2, 2021	General	Mark D. Sickles	Democratic	22,447	70.02
Nov 2, 2021	General	Brenton Hammond	Republican	9,502	29.07
Nov 2, 2021	General	Write Ins		40	0.01
Nov 7, 2023	General	Mark D. Sickles	Democratic	17,931	92.2
Nov 7, 2023	General	Write Ins		1,521	7.8
