= Virginia's 84th House of Delegates district =

Virginia legislative district

District map from the 2023 election

Virginia's 84th House of Delegates district elects one of 100 seats in the Virginia House of Delegates, the lower house of the state's bicameral legislature. District 84 covers all of Franklin, portions of Isle of Wight County, Suffolk and a very small part of Chesapeake. The district is currently represented by Democrat Nadarius Clark.

== District officeholders ==
Years	Delegate	Party	Electoral history
January 12, 1983 – January 8, 1992	Glenn McClanan	Democratic	Lost reelection
January 8, 1992 – January 14, 2006	Bob McDonnell	Republican	Declined to seek reelection; Elected Attorney General of the Commonwealth of Virginia
January 11, 2006 – July 1, 2013	Sal Iaquinto	Republican	Declined to seek reelection; Resigned; Appointed to Virginia Beach General District Court
January 8, 2014 – April 24, 2023	Glenn Davis	Republican	Resigned to serve as director of the Virginia Department of Energy
January 10, 2024 – present	Nadarius Clark	Democratic	
