= William Fralin =

American politician (born 1963)

Member of the Virginia House of Delegates from the 17th district
- In office January 14, 2004 – January 13, 2010
- Preceded by: Vic Thomas
- Succeeded by: William Cleaveland

Personal details
- Born: William Heywood Fralin Jr. February 8, 1963 (age 63) Alexandria, Virginia, U.S.
- Party: Republican
- Spouse: Karen Richmond Buswell
- Children: 3
- Education: University of Virginia (BA); University of Richmond (JD)
- Occupation: Lawyer; politician

William Heywood Fralin Jr. (born February 8, 1963) is an American politician and lawyer. He was a Republican member of the Virginia House of Delegates 2004–2010, representing the 17th district in the western part of the state, made up of parts of Botetourt and Roanoke Counties and the city of Roanoke.

== Electoral history ==
Date	Election	Candidate	Party	Votes	%
Virginia House of Delegates, 17th district
November 4, 2003	General	W H Fralin Jr	Republican	9,890	62.05
November 4, 2003	General	L F Wyatt	Democratic	5,072	31.82
November 4, 2003	General	G M Bowman		975	6.12
November 4, 2003	General	Write Ins		1	0.01
November 4, 2003	General	Vic Thomas retired; seat changed from Democratic to Republican			
November 8, 2005	General	W H Fralin Jr	Republican	19,049	98.65
November 8, 2005	General	Write Ins		261	1.35
November 6, 2007	General	William H. Fralin, Jr.	Republican	10,875	75.11
November 6, 2007	General	Alexander H. Ballin		3,569	24.65
November 6, 2007	General	Write Ins		34	0.23
