= Virginia's 43rd House of Delegates district =

Virginia legislative district

District map from the 2023 election

Virginia's 43rd House of Delegates district elects one of 100 seats in the Virginia House of Delegates, the lower house of the state's bicameral legislature. District 43 represents the entirety of Buchanan, Tazewell and Bland Counties, as well as parts of Dickenson and Russell Counties. The seat is currently held by Republican Will Morefield.
