= George Browning =

George Browning may refer to:

- George L. Browning (1867–1947), Justice, Virginia Supreme Court
- George Browning (bishop) (born 1942), Anglican bishop of Canberra and Goulburn, Australia
- George Browning (cricketer) (1858–1900), Australian cricketer
- George M. Browning Jr. (1928–2019), United States Air Force general
- George W. Browning (1870–1961), American politician in the Virginia House of Delegates
