= George A. Bowles =

American politician

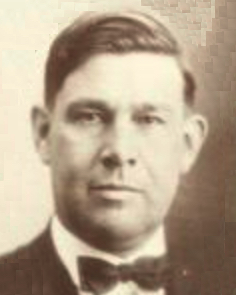

4th Virginia Commissioner of Insurance
- In office April 14, 1932 – June 1, 1956
- Preceded by: M. E. Bristow
- Succeeded by: T. Nelson Parker

Member of the Virginia House of Delegates for Goochland and Fluvanna
- In office January 12, 1916 – January 8, 1930
- Preceded by: E. Tucker Hughes
- Succeeded by: Dabney Cosby

Personal details
- Born: George Ashby Bowles; May 11, 1883 Kents Store, Virginia, U.S.
- Died: June 1, 1956 (aged 73) Richmond, Virginia, U.S.
- Party: Democratic
- Spouse: Georgia Kennon
- Education: Medical College of Virginia

George Ashby Bowles Sr. (May 11, 1883 – June 1, 1956) was an American Democratic politician who served as a member of the Virginia House of Delegates and as Virginia state insurance commissioner for more than 20 years.

His historic family home, The Oaks, is on the National Register of Historic Places.

Virginia House of Delegates
Preceded by E. Tucker Hughes	Virginia Delegate for Goochland and Fluvanna; 1916–1930	Succeeded by Dabney Cosby
Political offices
Preceded by	Virginia Commissioner of Insurance; 1932–1956	Succeeded by T. Nelson Parker
