= Virginia's 82nd House of Delegates district =

Virginia legislative district

District map from the 2023 election

Virginia's 82nd House of Delegates district elects one of 100 seats in the Virginia House of Delegates, the lower house of the state's bicameral legislature. The district contains part of Virginia Beach. Between 2016 and 2022, this seat was held by Republican Jason Miyares who was elected as Attorney General of Virginia in the 2021 election. Kimberly Pope Adams was elected to the seat in the 2025 election.

== District officeholders ==
Years	Delegate	Party	Electoral history
January 12, 1983 – January 8, 1986	Buster O'Brien	Republican	
January 8, 1986 – January 8, 2014	Harry R. Purkey	Republican	Declined to seek reelection
January 8, 2014 – January 13, 2016	Bill DeSteph	Republican	Declined to seek reelection; Elected to the Senate of Virginia
January 13, 2016 – January 12, 2022	Jason Miyares	Republican	Declined to seek reelection; Elected Attorney General of Virginia
January 12, 2022 – January 10, 2024	Anne Ferrell Tata	Republican	First elected in 2021 Redistricted to the 99th district
January 10, 2024 – January 14, 2026	Kim Taylor	Republican	Redistricted from the 63rd district Lost reelection
January 14, 2026 – present	Kimberly Pope Adams	Democratic	First elected in 2025

== Electoral history ==
Date	Election	Candidate	Party	Votes	%
Virginia House of Delegates, 82nd district
Nov 5, 2013	General	William R. DeSteph Jr.	Republican	13,995	59.78
Nov 5, 2013	General	William W. Fleming	Democratic	9,372	40.03
Nov 5, 2013	General	Write Ins		43	0.18
