= Robert Massie (disambiguation) =

Robert K. Massie (1929–2019) was an American historian.

Robert Massie may also refer to:

- Robert B. Massie (1896–1961), American politician in the Virginia House of Delegates
- Robert George Massie (1815–1883), member of the Queensland Legislative Council
- Robert Lee Massie (1941–2001), American murderer executed in California
- Bob Massie (born 1947), Australian cricketer
- Bob Massie (activist) (born 1956), son of Robert K. Massie, American Episcopalian priest and sustainability activist

== See also ==
- Robert Massey (disambiguation)
- Bob Masse, Canadian artist
