= James M. Baker =

James M. Baker may refer to:

- James M. Baker (mayor) (born 1942), mayor of Wilmington, Delaware from 2001 to 2013
- James M. Baker (Virginia politician) (1845–1927), member of the Virginia House of Delegates
- James Marion Baker (1861–1940), 11th Secretary of the United States Senate
- James McNair Baker (1821–1892), American jurist and politician in the Confederate Senate during Civil War
- James Mitchell Baker (1878–1956), South African Olympic runner
