= Lashrecse Aird =

American politician (born 1986)

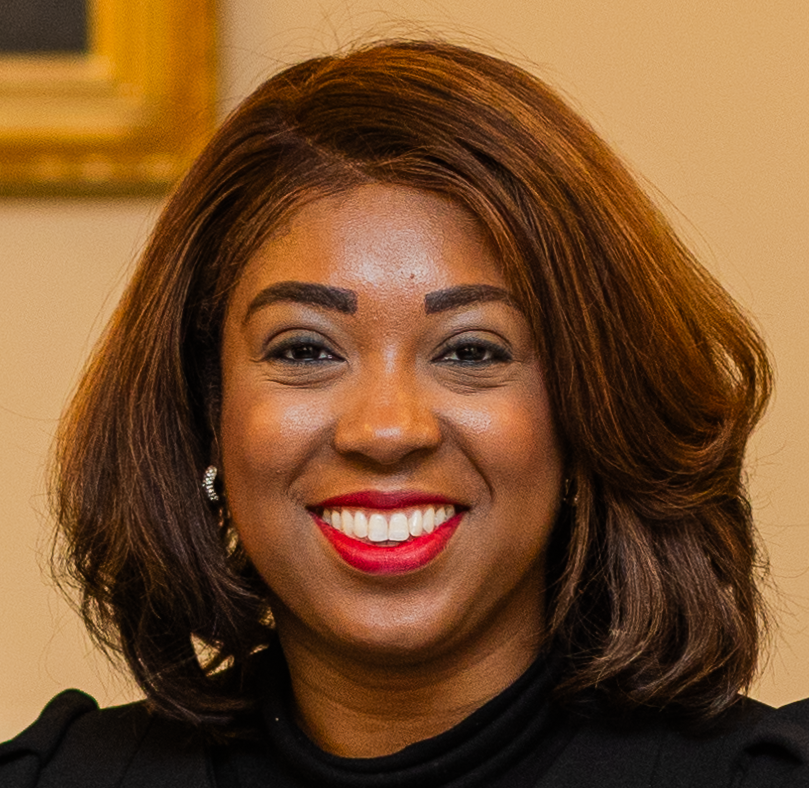
- Aird in 2024

Member of the Virginia Senate from the 13th district
- Incumbent
- Assumed office January 10, 2024
- Preceded by: John Bell (Redistricting)

Member of the Virginia House of Delegates from the 63rd district
- In office January 13, 2016 – January 12, 2022
- Preceded by: Joseph Preston
- Succeeded by: Kim Taylor

Personal details
- Born: Lashrecse Dianna Jones; June 22, 1986 (age 40) Buffalo, New York, U.S.
- Party: Democratic
- Spouse: Blaine Aird
- Education: Virginia State University (BA); Virginia Commonwealth University
- Website: lashrecseaird.com

Lashrecse Dianna Aird /ˌlɑ.ʃəˈɹ̠iːs ˈɛɹ̠d/ (née Jones; born June 22, 1986) is an American Democratic politician who represents Virginia's 13th Senate district after winning its Democratic primary and the subsequent general election in 2023. District 13 covers all of Charles City County, Prince George County, Surry County, Sussex County, Hopewell City and Petersburg City; and parts of Dinwiddie County and Henrico County. She represented the 63rd District in the Virginia House of Delegates from 2016 to 2022. Aird served on the General Laws, Health, Welfare and Institutions, and Appropriations committees.

== Career ==
Aird was born on June 22, 1986. While attending Virginia State University, Aird met Rosalyn Dance, who invited her to apply for an internship with her office. Aird interned with Dance throughout college and worked for Dance as a legislative assistant after college. When Dance ran for the state Senate in 2015, Aird ran to fill her vacant seat in the House of Delegates. She was the youngest woman elected to the Virginia House of Delegates.

In 2016, Aird served as a member of Virginia's Electoral College. In 2017, Aird was appointed to the House Appropriations Committee by Republican Speaker William J. Howell.

Aird is the Chair of 4th Congressional District Democratic Committee, which oversees local Democratic committees in the area between Hampton Roads and Richmond. Aird is also a member of the Democratic Party of Virginia Steering Committee.

In 2020, Aird was appointed to the Virginia Tobacco Region Revitalization Commission. In 2021, Aird worked with local leaders, fellow legislators, and the Virginia Economic Development Partnership to secure a $25 million investment from Civica Rx to expand their manufacturing operations in Petersburg, Virginia.

In 2021, she was narrowly defeated for reelection by Republican businesswoman Kim Taylor in a major upset.

In 2023, she ran for Virginia's 13th Senate district. She was endorsed by state senators Jennifer Boysko, Ghazala Hashmi, Barbara Favola, Janet Howell, Mamie Locke, and Louise Lucas. She won the Democratic primary against incumbent Joe Morrissey by a 40% margin.

On November 7, 2023, Lashrecse Aird defeated Eric Ditri in the general election for Virginia's 13th Senate district. She assumed office on January 10, 2024.

== Political positions ==
In 2019, Aird passed HB 2005 which expanded eligibility for temporary assistance for needy families. Also in 2019, Aird passed HB 2317 establishing a safety protocol wherein a parent may request the presence of a law enforcement officer during a custody exchange.

In 2020, Aird joined Luke Torian as chief co-patron on HB 1250, also known as the Virginia Community Policing Act. Prior to 2020, employers in the Commonwealth of Virginia were not required to provide documentation to their employees showing the number of hours worked or how gross and net pay were calculated. During the 2020 Legislative Session, Aird passed HB 689 which now compels employers to provide paystubs to their workers.

Also during the 2020 Session, Aird passed HB 757, which deals with criminal records searches for prospective employees. Aird passed HB 690 which repealed the prohibition on increasing the amount of Temporary Assistance for Needy Families (TANF) that a family receives upon the birth of a child during the period of TANF eligibility. Aird joined Republican Christopher Collins as Chief Co-Patron on HB 2655 which established the Eviction Diversion Pilot Program.

During the 2021 Session, Aird joined Marcia Price as a co-patron on HB 1864 (also known as the Virginia Human Rights act) which expanded the definition of "employer" to include people who employ domestic workers. The act also prohibits workplace discrimination based on race, religion, sexual orientation, gender identity, disability, and other factors.

=== Education ===
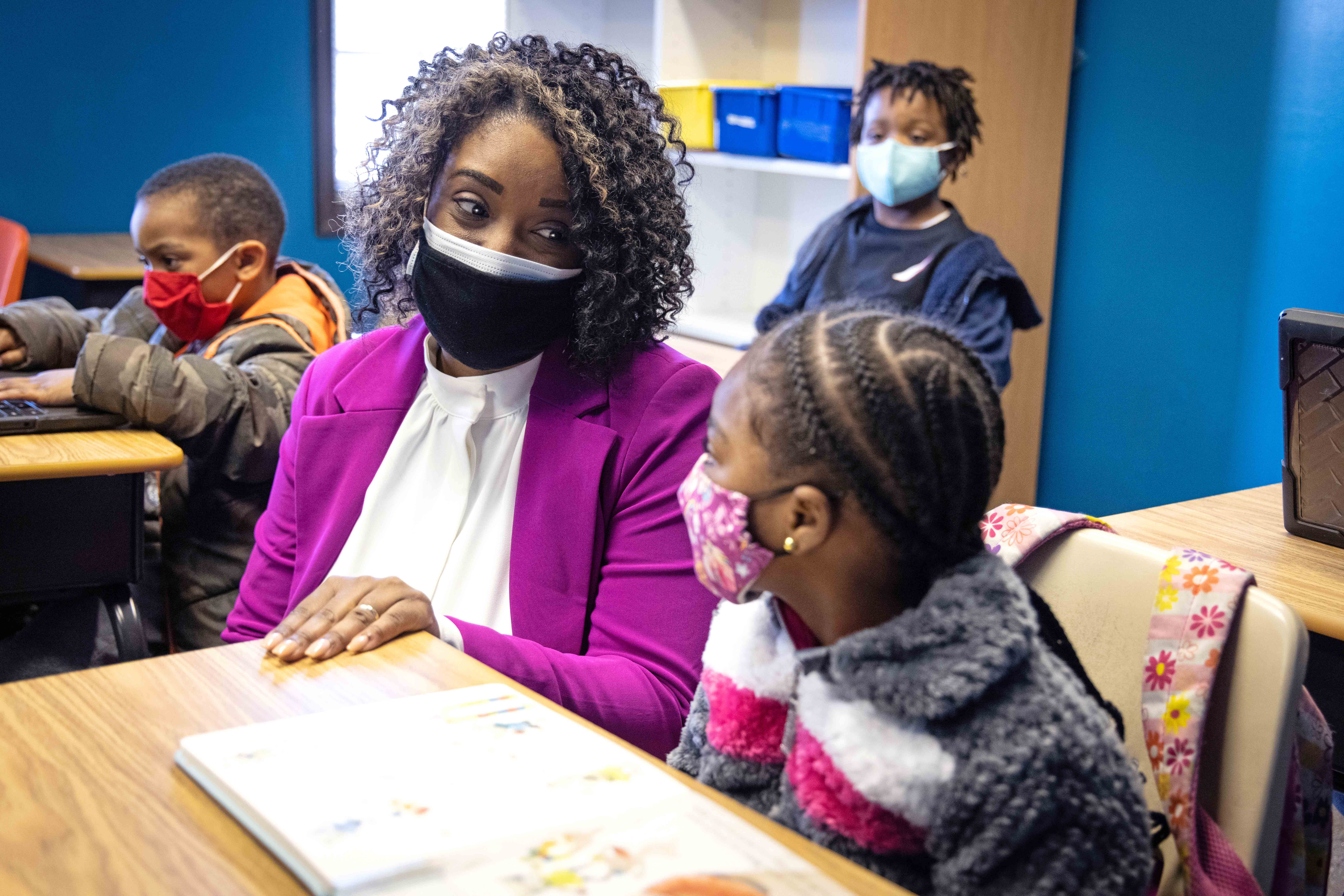
Aird visits a community after school program in Petersburg, Virginia on March 20, 2021

Aird has placed a significant emphasis on education through both legislation and by advocating for money for school systems in her district.

In 2018, Aird proposed a budget amendment to increase funding for the state's At-Risk Add-On program, which would substantially increase state funding for schools with low-income students.

In 2021, Aird joined Jennifer McClellan to reintroduce legislation to require the state to meet the funding obligations prescribed by the State Board of Education. In 2021, Aird joined Danica Roem as a co-patron on her bill to require all eligible school districts to participate in the Federal After School Meals Program (HB 2135).

In 2021, Aird passed HB 1930 which prohibits most state universities from inquiring about an applicant's criminal history during the initial admissions process (a policy commonly referred to as Ban the Box). On June 3, 2021, Governor Ralph Northam joined Aird to ceremonially sign the bill at Dinwiddie High School in Dinwiddie, Virginia.

=== Environment ===
Aird co-patroned HB 1526, also known as The Virginia Clean Economy Act. The VCEA is framed around four policy areas with the goal of reaching net-zero carbon emissions: capping carbon pollution, establishing energy efficiency resource standards, incentivizing small scale rooftop solar energy, and develop a 100% clean energy grid.

In 2019, Aird sponsored and passed HB 2741, which created the Virginia Clean Energy Advisory Board and created a pilot program to distribute loans and rebates for the installation of solar energy infrastructure. In 2020, Aird sponsored and passed HB 1707 to increase the board's membership. The law dictated that the new members "shall be an expert with experience implementing low-income and middle-income incentive and loan programs for distributed renewable energy resources and that the other new member shall be an attorney who maintains a legal practice dedicated to rural development, rural electrification, and energy policy."

=== Public health ===
In 2019 Aird joined Marcia Price to introduce a resolution "recognizing the maternal and infant mortality crisis in the h States." The Resolution included language addressing root causes of maternal mortality including stating that maternal and infant mortality "is exacerbated by factors such as poverty, gender inequality, age, and multiple forms of discrimination, as well as factors such as lack of access to adequate health facilities and technology and lack of infrastructure." In 2020 Aird passed HB 687 which established a state certification program for doulas and expanded eligibility for patients seeking to access doula services.

In 2021, Aird passed HJ 538, a resolution that recognizes access to clean, potable, and affordable water is a necessary human right and established initiatives to ensure no Virginian goes without access to this essential need. Aird is an advocate for reproductive freedom and serves on the board of the Virginia League for Planned Parenthood.

==== COVID-19 response ====
After speaking with first responders about the challenges they faced in combating the COVID-19 pandemic, Aird passed HB 1989, which directed the Virginia Department of Health to share real time public health data with emergency medical personnel to help reduce their risk of exposure to the virus.

In January 2021, Aird joined Lamont Bagby as a co-patron of HB 2333 which established a program to enable eligible health care providers to volunteer to administer the COVID-19 vaccine to residents of the Commonwealth during the state of emergency.

=== Voting rights ===
In 2021, Aird served as a chief co-patron of Marcia Price's HB 1890, also known as the Voting Rights Act of Virginia.

== Electoral history ==
Date	Election	Candidate	Party	Votes	%
Virginia House of Delegates, 63rd district
June 9, 2015	Primary	Lashrecse D. Aird	Democratic	1,975	40.16
June 9, 2015	Primary	Larry D. Brown Sr.	Democratic	1,038	21.11
June 9, 2015	Primary	Gerry J. Rawlinson	Democratic	1,024	20.82
June 9, 2015	Primary	Atiba H. Muse	Democratic	647	13.16
June 9, 2015	Primary	William H. Jones Jr.	Democratic	234	4.76
November 3, 2015	General	Lashrecse D. Aird	Democratic	9,310	96.50
November 3, 2015	General	Write Ins		338	3.50
November 3, 2015	General	Joseph E. Preston ran for Senate; seat stayed Democratic			
June 13, 2017	Primary	Lashrecse D. Aird	Democratic	5,062	72.11
June 13, 2017	Primary	Gerry J. Rawlinson	Democratic	1,958	27.89
November 7, 2017	General	Lashrecse D. Aird	Democratic	15,623	95.11
November 7, 2017	General	Write Ins		804	4.89
November 5, 2019	General	Lashrecse D. Aird	Democratic	12,796	55.04
November 5, 2019	General	Larry Haake	Independent	10,291	44.27
November 5, 2019	General	Write Ins		160	0.69
November 2, 2021	General	Lashrecse D. Aird	Democratic	16,301	49.16
November 2, 2021	General	Kim Taylor	Republican	16,813	50.70
November 2, 2021	General	Write Ins		45	0.14

Virginia House of Delegates
Preceded by Joseph Preston	Member of the Virginia House of Delegates from the 63rd district 2016–2022	Succeeded by Kim Taylor
Senate of Virginia
Preceded by John Bell	Member of the Virginia Senate from the 13th district 2024–Present	Incumbent
