= Pembroke Pettit =

American lawyer and politician

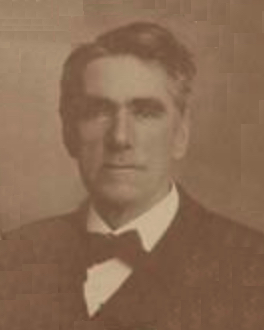
- Official portrait, 1906

Member of the Virginia House of Delegates for Goochland and Fluvanna
- In office January 10, 1906 – January 8, 1908
- Preceded by: Ernest Alfonso Gray
- Succeeded by: John G. Luce
- In office December 6, 1899 – December 4, 1901
- Preceded by: George W. Browning
- Succeeded by: David H. Leake

Member of the Virginia Senate from the 16th district
- In office December 5, 1883 – December 8, 1887
- Preceded by: Wyatt M. Elliott
- Succeeded by: Edmund W. Hubard

Personal details
- Born: June 13, 1852 Cumberland, Virginia, U.S.
- Died: April 7, 1928 (aged 75) Richmond, Virginia, U.S.
- Party: Democratic
- Spouse: Virginia Bernard Wills
- Parent: William B. Pettit (father)
- Education: Randolph Macon College; University of Virginia

Pembroke Pettit (June 13, 1852 – April 7, 1928) was an American lawyer and politician from Virginia. A Democrat, he served in the Virginia General Assembly, first in the Virginia Senate and later in the Virginia House of Delegates. He attended Randolph Macon College and the University of Virginia.

Senate of Virginia
Preceded by Wyatt M. Elliott	Virginia Senator for the 16th District; 1883–1887	Succeeded by Edmund W. Hubard
Virginia House of Delegates
Preceded by George W. Browning	Virginia Delegate for Goochland and Fluvanna; 1899–1901; 1906–1908	Succeeded by David H. Leake
Preceded by Ernest A. Gray	Virginia Delegate for Goochland and Fluvanna; 1899–1901; 1906–1908	Succeeded by John G. Luce
