= Phillip Scott (Virginia politician) =

American politician from Virginia

Phillip A. Scott
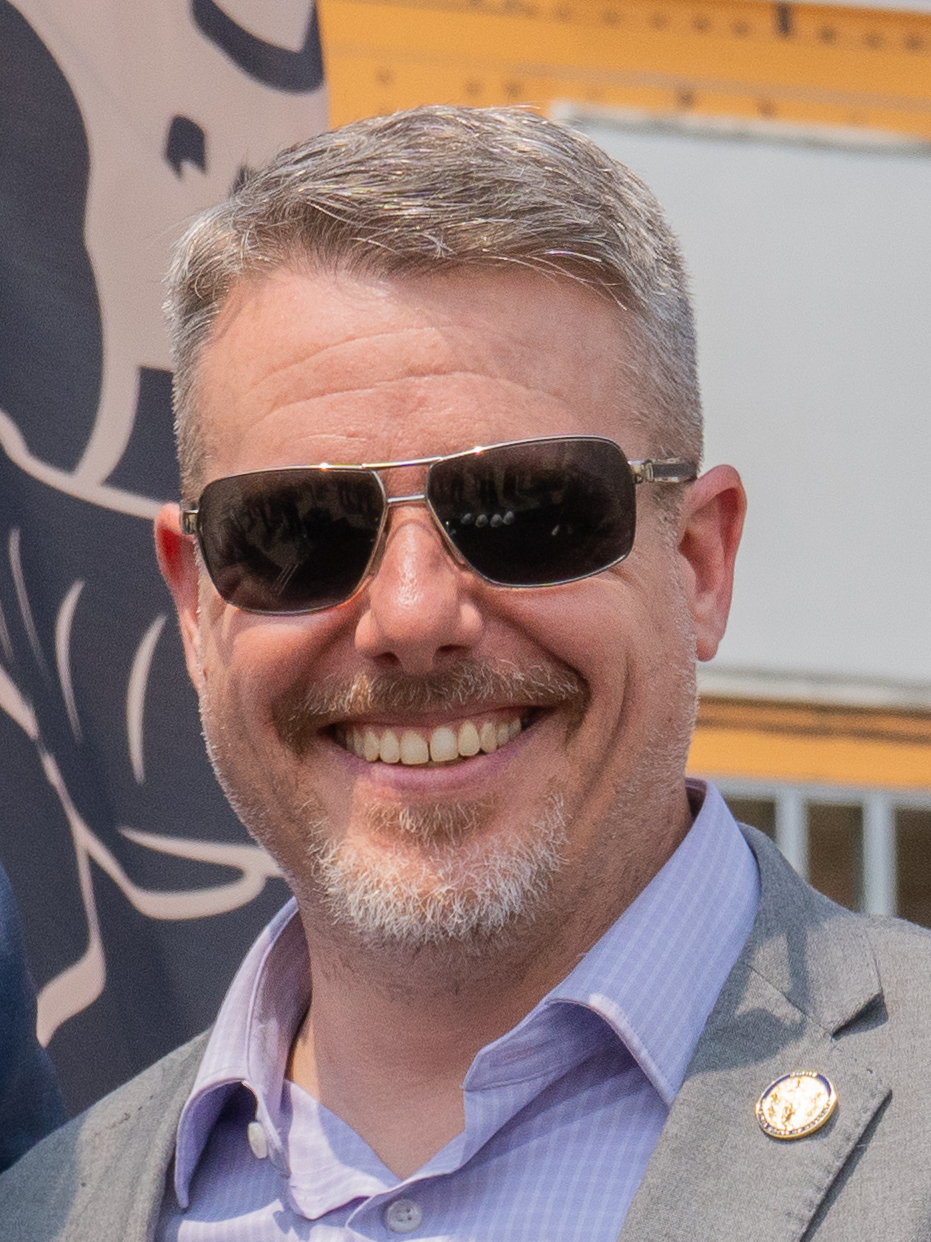
- Scott in 2025

Member of the Virginia House of Delegates
- Incumbent
- Assumed office January 12, 2022
- Preceded by: Mark Cole
- Constituency: 88th District (2022–2024); 63rd District (2024–Present)

Personal details
- Born: 1982 (age 43–44) Voorhees, New Jersey, U.S.
- Party: Republican
- Spouse: Elisabeth Scott
- Children: 5
- Education: Liberty University (BS, MA, JM)
- Profession: Background Investigator
- Committees: Education; Privileges and Elections; Health and Human Services
- Website: www.philscottva.com

Phillip Andrew Scott is an American politician. A Republican, he is a member of the Virginia House of Delegates, representing the 63rd district. Scott was first elected in 2021, succeeding retiring delegate Mark Cole.

== Personal life and career ==
Scott was born in Voorhees, New Jersey, and raised in New Jersey and Maine. Scott moved to Virginia in high school. After working in fast food and construction, Scott began working for a federal contractor as a background investigator. Scott is a resident of Spotsylvania County, Virginia, where he lives with his wife and five daughters.

== Political career ==
Scott's first run for public office was for Spotsylvania County School Board in 2019 for the Chancellor District. Scott would lose the election to incumbent school board member Dawn Shelley.

Scott was nominated as the Republican candidate for the 88th district on April 24, 2021, defeating two other candidates in a closed party canvass. The district was described by Virginia Public Access Project as "strong Republican." In the November 2021 general election, Scott defeated Democrat Kecia Evans by a 57 to 41 percent margin.

In the 2022 legislative session, Scott sponsored a bill to allow localities to lower vehicle tax rates, in response to rising prices for used cars. This bill was signed into law by Governor Glenn Youngkin. The second dealt with licensing requirements for licensed professional counselors. In the 2023 Assembly session, Scott introduced a bill that would reduce Virginia's early voting period from 45 days to 14 days.

In the 2023 House of Delegates elections, Scott ran in the new 63rd district. Virginia's legislative maps were redrawn in the decennial redistricting. No opponent filed to run against him. However, school board member Dawn Shelley announced a write-in campaign against Scott. Creating a rematch of their 2019 school board race. Scott would easily win reelection with 83% of the vote.

== Electoral history ==
Spotsylvania County School Board Chancellor District, 2019
Party	Candidate	Votes	%
Independent	Dawn Abboud Shelley (incumbent)	2,755	54.0
Independent	Phillip Andrew Scott	2,336	45.8
Write-in		12	0.2
Total votes		5,103	100.0
Independent hold			

Virginia's 88th House of Delegates district, 2021 Republican firehouse primary
Party	Candidate	Votes	%
Republican	Phillip Scott	614	45.9
Republican	Rich Breeden	536	40.1
Republican	Holly Hazard	187	14.0
Total votes		1,337	100.0

Virginia's 88th House of Delegates district, 2021
Party	Candidate	Votes	%
Republican	Phillip Andrew Scott	22,747	57.4
Democratic	Lakecia Shawnette Evans	16,158	40.7
Libertarian	Timothy Michael Lewis	723	1.8
Write-in		32	0.1
Total votes		39,660	100.0
Republican hold			

Virginia's 63rd House of Delegates District, 2023 general election
Party	Candidate	Votes	%
Republican	Phillip A. "Phil" Scott (incumbent)	21,645	83.56
Write-in		4,258	16.44
Total votes		25,903	100
Republican hold			

Virginia House of Delegates
Preceded by Mark Cole	Member of the Virginia House of Delegates from the 88th district 2022–2024	Succeeded by Don Scott
Preceded by Kim Taylor	Member of the Virginia House of Delegates from the 63rd district 2024–Present	Incumbent
