= Samuel Shelton =

Samuel Shelton may refer to:

- Samuel A. Shelton (1858–1948), U.S. Representative from Missouri
- Samuel W. Shelton (1890–1974), American lawyer and politician in the Virginia House of Delegates
