= Kim Taylor (politician) =

American politician from Virginia (born 1978)

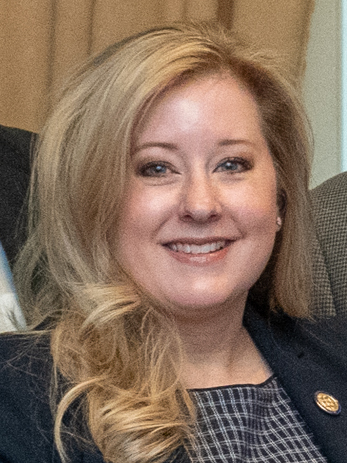
- Taylor in 2023

Member of the Virginia House of Delegates
- In office January 12, 2022 – January 14, 2026
- Preceded by: Lashrecse Aird
- Succeeded by: Kimberly Pope Adams
- Constituency: 63rd district (2022–2024); 82nd district (2024–2026)

Personal details
- Born: 1978 (age 47–48) Petersburg, Virginia, U.S.
- Party: Republican
- Spouse: Andrew Perry
- Children: 1
- Education: Virginia Commonwealth University (BA)

Kimberly A. Taylor (born 1978) is an American politician who served as a member of the Virginia House of Delegates for the 82nd district until 2026. A member of the Republican Party, she defeated incumbent Democratic delegate Lashrecse Aird to win her seat in the 2021 election and was defeated by Democrat Kimberly Pope Adams in the 2025 election. Taylor represented parts of Chesterfield, Dinwiddie, and Prince George counties, taking in the city of Petersburg and parts of Hopewell.

== Early life and education ==
Taylor was born in 1978 in Petersburg, Virginia. After graduating from high school, she earned a bachelor's degree in psychology from Virginia Commonwealth University.

== Career ==
Following her graduation, she worked with the Richmond Times-Dispatch in retail sales. Before entering politics, Taylor co-owned two automobile repair shops in Chesterfield and Moseley, along with her husband.

=== Virginia House of Delegates ===
Taylor announced her candidacy for the 63rd district in January 2021, challenging Democratic incumbent Lashrecse Aird. In the November 2021 general election, she narrowly defeated Aird in her bid for re-election by a margin of 512 votes in an upset. Taylor's victory was the tipping point necessary for the Republican Party to regain majority control in the House of Delegates. Taylor took office, along with the rest of the 162nd Virginia General Assembly, on January 12, 2022.

In the 2023 Virginia House of Delegates election, Democratic challenger Kimberly Pope Adams called for a recount on December 5, 2023. In the recount, Taylor had 14,289 votes and Adams had 14,236. With a margin of 53 votes, Taylor was re-elected.

In 2024, Taylor was one of five Republican delegates who voted with their Democratic colleagues in support of safeguarding same-sex marriage in Virginia.

In the 2025 Virginia House of Delegates election, Taylor was defeated by Adams.

== Personal life ==
Taylor is married to Andrew "Butch" Perry. They have one daughter and reside in Dinwiddie County.

Virginia House of Delegates
Preceded by Lashrecse Aird	Member of the Virginia House of Delegates from the 63rd district 2022–2024	Succeeded by Phillip Scott
Preceded by Anne Ferrell Tata	Member of the Virginia House of Delegates from the 82nd district 2024–Present	Incumbent
