= Virginia's 88th House of Delegates district =

Virginia legislative district

District map from the 2023 election

Virginia's 88th House of Delegates district elects one of 100 seats in the Virginia House of Delegates, the lower house of the state's bicameral legislature. District 88 covers part of Fauquier County, Spotsylvania County, Stafford County, and part of the city of Fredericksburg, Virginia. This district is currently represented by Republican Phillip Scott.

== District officeholders ==
Years	Delegate	Party	Electoral history
January 12, 1983 – January 1, 2002	Tom Moss	Democratic	First ever delegate of district
January 12, 2002 – January 12, 2022	Mark Cole	Republican	First elected in 2002
January 12, 2022 – January 12, 2024	Phillip Scott	Republican	First elected in 2021

== Results ==
Virginia's 88th House of Delegates district election, 2015
Party	Candidate	Votes	%
Republican	Mark L. Cole (inc.)	11,123	93.6%
	Write-ins	764	6.4%
Total votes		11,887	100%
