= Mark Cole =

American politician (born 1958)

Member of the Virginia House of Delegates from the 88th district
- In office January 9, 2002 – January 12, 2022
- Preceded by: Tom Moss
- Succeeded by: Phillip Scott

Personal details
- Born: Mark Lanze Cole; June 6, 1958 (age 68) Louisville, Kentucky, U.S.
- Party: Republican
- Spouse: Eugenia Ann Fairchild
- Children: Jeremy Cole
- Education: Western Kentucky University; Germanna Community College; Mary Washington College
- Profession: Systems Analyst
- Committees: Privileges and Elections (Chair); Education; Finance
- Website: www.marklcole.com

Military service
- Branch/service: United States Navy
- Years of service: 1980–2004
- Rank: Commander
- Unit: USS Mississippi (CGN-40); United States Naval Reserve (1985–2004)
- Awards: Navy Commendation Medal (3)

Mark Lanze Cole (born June 6, 1958) is an American politician of the Republican Party. From 2002 until 2022 he was a member of the Virginia House of Delegates. He represented the 88th district in the Virginia Piedmont, made up of parts of Fauquier, Spotsylvania and Stafford Counties, and the City of Fredericksburg, Virginia. Cole did not run for re-election in 2021.

== Personal ==
Cole grew up in Monticello, Kentucky and graduated from Monticello High School. He has a bachelor's degree in civil engineering technology from the Western Kentucky University, an associate degree in computer information systems from Germanna Community College and a bachelor's degree in computer science from the University of Mary Washington.

== Military service ==
After graduation from Western Kentucky University in 1980, Cole entered the United States Navy and was commissioned as an officer. He served on USS Mississippi (CGN-40) as ordnance officer and assistant combat systems officer. He left active duty in 1985 but continued to serve in the United States Naval Reserve where he retired as a commander in 2004.

== Professional career ==
After leaving the Navy in 1985, Cole was employed as a systems analyst and manager by Northrop Grumman supporting the Navy at Dahlgren, Virginia, until 2012. In 2013 he was hired by Spotsylvania County, Virginia as deputy county administrator.

== Political career ==
Cole was elected to the Spotsylvania County, Virginia Board of Supervisors in 1999, where he served until 2002 when he took office in the Virginia House of Delegates. He was the chairman of the House Privileges and Elections Committee until the Democratic Party took the majority in the Virginia House of Delegates in the 2019 election. He is also a member of the House Finance and Education Committees.

=== Positions ===
Cole describes himself as a fiscal and social conservative that supports individual rights while opposing tax increases. He opposed Republican initiatives to raise taxes in 2007 and 2013.

Cole voted against Medicaid expansion, HB5001, in the 2018 legislative session. The bill passed 68–30 in the House of Delegates with bipartisan support.

==== Microchip implantation ====
Cole was criticized in February 2010 for comments made by him about his sponsorship of HB53, a bill in the House of Delegates which would ban involuntary implantation of microchips into humans by their employers:

My understanding -- I'm not a theologian -- but there's a prophecy in the Bible that says you'll have to receive a mark, or you can neither buy nor sell things in end times, some people think these computer chips might be that mark.

Rob Boston of Americans United for Separation of Church and State said of this on MSNBC that "the sort of paranoid strain of thinking among these folks just—it advances to meet the new technology that we have." Despite MSNBC's crusade against Delegate Cole, calling him "Mark of the Beast Cole" his bill (similar to one passed in other states) passed the House on a bi-partisan vote 88 to 9.

==== Bathroom bills ====
In 2016, Cole sponsored House Bill 663, a bathroom bill restricting public restroom use according to a person's "anatomical sex", defined as "the physical condition of being male or female, which is determined by a person's anatomy", with violators liable for a civil penalty not to exceed $50. HB663 was introduced on January 11, 2016, and died in committee in February 2016. It was widely reported that HB663 would require adults to inspect the genitals of children before they were allowed to enter the appropriate facilities, but this was dismissed by Snopes as a misleading interpretation of the bill's text, which states that administrators "shall develop and implement policies that require every restroom ... that is designated for use by a specific gender to solely be used by individuals whose anatomical sex matches such gender designation." Cole sponsored House Bill 781 one day later on January 12, 2016, which used the same wording but substituted "biological sex" for "anatomical sex". The use of "biological sex" allowed for an update via amended birth certificate. HB781 also died in committee in February.

==== Voter registration ====
In 2017, Cole sponsored House Bill 1598, which would require those registering to vote after January 1, 2018, for state and local elections to provide proof of citizenship. HB1598 passed the House of Delegates on a 64–37 party line vote in February 2017.

==== Redistricting reform ====
In 2019, Cole sponsored an amendment to Virginia's Constitution (HJ615) to establish a bipartisan commission to redraw legislative and congressional district lines after the national decennial census. After passing the General Assembly a second time in 2020, the amendment was overwhelmingly approved by voters and was in effect during Virginia's 2021 redistricting.

==== Fornication laws ====
Cole voted against a bill to eliminate a law banning sexual intercourse before marriage in the 2020 legislative session. The bill passed 91–5 with bipartisan support in the house.

==== Committee memberships ====
Cole served as chairman of the House Privileges and Elections Committee from 2008 until 2020, when Democrats took the majority in the House. He also served on the House Finance, Education, General Laws, Science and Technology, and Counties, Cities and Towns committees during his tenure.

== 2020–21 United States election protests ==
Cole was one of three GOP delegates in Virginia that sent a letter to Vice President Pence asking him to delay the certification of the state's election results, which gave President-elect Joe Biden the win and Virginia's 13 electoral votes, until an audit of the election could be completed. The letter included two co-signers, Del. Dave LaRock (R-Loudoun) and Del. Ronnie Campbell (R-Lexington), requesting "a stay of any designation of Presidential Electors from our state until such time as a comprehensive forensic audit of the November 3, 2020, election has taken place to determine the actual winner." On January 13, a Virginia Circuit Court issued a consent order agreeing with one of the major points of the letter, that the conduct of the 2020 election was contrary to Virginia law. Cole played a role in Virginia's election policy in the past as a former chairman of the House Privileges and Elections Committee.
