= John Q. Rhodes Jr. =

American politician

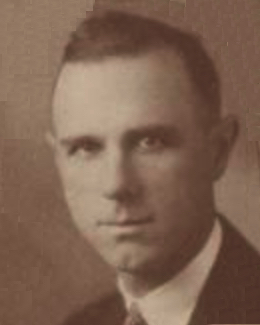

Member of the Virginia House of Delegates from Louisa County
- In office January 8, 1930 – January 8, 1936
- Preceded by: R. Lindsay Gordon Jr.
- Succeeded by: Robert B. Massie

Personal details
- Born: John Quincy Rhodes Jr. November 27, 1892 Louisa, Virginia, U.S.
- Died: May 18, 1959 (aged 66) Richmond, Virginia, U.S.
- Party: Democratic
- Spouse: Louise Saunders Crank
- Education: Randolph–Macon College; Washington and Lee University

John Quincy Rhodes Jr. (November 27, 1892 – May 18, 1959) was an American attorney and politician who served in the Virginia House of Delegates, representing Louisa County.

Virginia House of Delegates
| Preceded by R. Lindsay Gordon Jr. | Virginia Delegate for Louisa County; 1930–1936 | Succeeded by Robert B. Massie |
