= Robert Massey (disambiguation) =

Robert Massey (born 1966) is an American football player.

Robert Massey may also refer to:

- Robert Massey (MP) for Flintshire (UK Parliament constituency), Flint Boroughs and Scarborough
- Bob Massey, of The Out Circuit

== See also ==
- Robert Massie (disambiguation)
