= R. Lindsay Gordon Jr. =

American politician

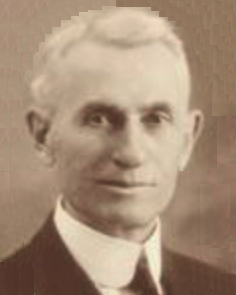

Member of the Virginia House of Delegates from Louisa County
- In office January 14, 1914 – January 8, 1930
- Preceded by: James M. Baker
- Succeeded by: John Q. Rhodes Jr.

Personal details
- Born: Reuben Lindsay Gordon Jr. January 21, 1855 Albemarle, Virginia, U.S.
- Died: December 25, 1939 (aged 84) Richmond, Virginia, U.S.
- Party: Democratic
- Spouse(s): Alice Maud Winston; Nellie Blair Hunt; Mary Hiter

Reuben Lindsay Gordon Jr. (January 21, 1855 – December 25, 1939) was an American attorney and politician who served in the Virginia House of Delegates from 1914 to 1930, representing Louisa County.

== Early and family life ==
Born in 1885 at his grandfather's Edgeworth plantation in Albemarle County, he would continue the family's legal and political traditions. His mother Eliza Z. Beale, had married his father, Reuben L. Gordon (whose first name reflected his maternal grandfather), at Fredericksburg in 1844. His family included an elder brother, William Gordon, and at least five sisters. His father practiced law in Orange County, and after his father's death, also farmed using enslaved labor, owning two enslaved families and a total of 22 slaves in the 1860 census. The elder Gordon educated this son at private schools as well as in legal matters, and would represent nearby Orange County, Virginia in the Virginia House of Delegates in 1883.

== Career ==
After being admitted to the Virginia bar, Gordon served as the Commonwealth Attorney (prosecutor) for Louisa County for 16 years (repeating his father's and grandfather's career paths). Louisa County voters elected him as well as one of their representatives to the Virginia Constitutional Convention of 1901. Nearly a decade later, Louisa voters elected Gordon to represent them in the Virginia House of Delegates in 1913, and re-elected him to that part-time position until the start of the Great Depression. John Q. Rhodes Jr. replaced him for the session that began in January 1930.

== Personal life ==
This man, the junior Gordon married three times, first to Alice M. Winston, whose family had lived in Louisa County for generations. After her death, he married Nellie Blair Hunt, and after her death, Gordon married Mary P. Hite.

Virginia House of Delegates
Preceded by James M. Baker	Virginia Delegate for Louisa County; 1914–1930	Succeeded by John Q. Rhodes Jr.
