= Stephen M. Shepherd =

American lawyer and politician

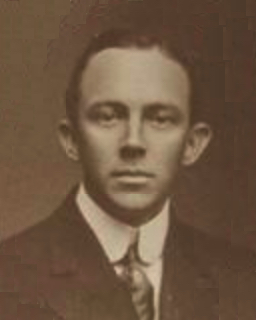
- Official portrait, 1910

Member of the Virginia House of Delegates for Goochland and Fluvanna
- In office January 12, 1910 – August 20, 1910
- Preceded by: John G. Luce
- Succeeded by: John Rutherfoord

Personal details
- Born: November 30, 1875 Fluvanna, Virginia, U.S.
- Died: August 20, 1910 (aged 34) Richmond, Virginia, U.S.
- Party: Democratic
- Education: University of Virginia

Stephen M. Shepherd (November 1, 1875 – August 20, 1910) was an American lawyer and politician who was elected to one term in the Virginia House of Delegates before dying of a stroke at age 34.

Virginia House of Delegates
Preceded by John G. Luce	Virginia Delegate for Goochland and Fluvanna; 1910–1910	Succeeded by John Rutherfoord
