= Malcolm W. Perkins =

American lawyer and politician

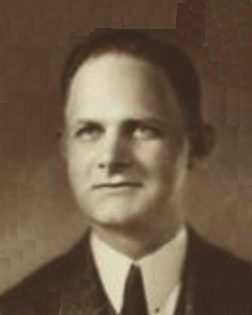
- Official portrait, 1932

Member of the Virginia House of Delegates for Goochland and Fluvanna
- In office January 13, 1932 – January 10, 1934
- Preceded by: Dabney Cosby
- Succeeded by: Samuel W. Shelton

Personal details
- Born: Malcolm White Perkins; August 18, 1888 Fluvanna, Virginia, U.S.
- Died: March 19, 1965 (aged 76) Asheville, North Carolina, U.S.
- Party: Democratic
- Spouse: Sallie Gray Shepherd (m. 1919)

Military service
- Allegiance: United States
- Branch/service: United States Army
- Unit: Air Service
- Battles/wars: World War I

Malcolm White Perkins (August 18, 1888 – March 19, 1965) was an American lawyer and politician who served for many years as circuit court clerk of Fluvanna County as well as one term in the Virginia House of Delegates.

Virginia House of Delegates
Preceded by Dabney Cosby	Virginia Delegate for Goochland and Fluvanna; 1932–1934	Succeeded by Samuel W. Shelton
