= Henry L. Marsh =

American politician (1933–2025)

Member of the Virginia Senate from the 16th district
- In office January 8, 1992 – July 3, 2014
- Preceded by: Elmon T. Gray
- Succeeded by: Rosalyn R. Dance

70th Mayor of Richmond, Virginia
- In office March 8, 1977 – June 30, 1982
- Preceded by: Thomas J. Bliley Jr.
- Succeeded by: Roy A. West

Personal details
- Born: Henry Leander Marsh III; December 10, 1933 Richmond, Virginia, U.S.
- Died: January 23, 2025 (aged 91)
- Party: Democratic
- Spouse: Diane Harris
- Children: 3
- Education: Virginia Union University (AB); Howard University (LLB)
- Profession: Lawyer

Military service
- Allegiance: United States
- Branch/service: United States Army
- Years of service: 1959–1961

Henry Leander Marsh III (December 10, 1933 – January 23, 2025) was an American civil rights lawyer and politician. A Democrat, Marsh was elected by the city council as the first African-American mayor of Richmond, Virginia in 1977. He was elected to the Senate of Virginia in 1991, and resigned from his seat in 2014. Marsh represented the 16th district, consisting of the city of Petersburg, Dinwiddie County, and parts of the city of Richmond, and Chesterfield and Prince George counties. Marsh was a commissioner on the Virginia Department of the Alcoholic Beverage Control Board, a position to which he received appointment from Governor Terry McAuliffe promptly after his departure from the Senate in 2014.

== Early life and education ==
Born in 1933, Henry L. Marsh III was named for his father and grandfather. His mother died when he was only five, and his father had to split up the young family of four children for several years. Marsh was sent to an aunt and uncle who lived in a rural area. While there, he attended Moonfield School, a racially segregated "one-room school with seven grades and one teacher and 78 pupils." His father was able to gather his children together again when Marsh was eleven. He started school in Richmond in fifth grade, attending George Mason Elementary School. Through this period, his father was working and also studying, having gone back to college to earn his degree and showing his children how important education was. In 1952, Henry Marsh graduated from Maggie L. Walker High School, where he was senior class vice president, president of the student NAACP chapter, and editor of the school newspaper. His brother Harold M. Marsh Sr. (d. 1997) also became a prominent civil rights attorney, and later managing partner of Hill, Tucker and Marsh in Richmond, as well as a local judge.

In 1956, Marsh obtained an A.B. degree in sociology from Virginia Union University. He attended the Howard University School of Law with an award of a scholarship, earning his LL.B in 1959. Marsh then served in the United States Army.

== Career ==
=== Legal career ===
During his senior year at Virginia Union, Marsh testified on behalf of the student government at a joint session of the Virginia General Assembly. Despite the U.S. Supreme Court ruling in Brown v. Board of Education, the Virginia legislature, consisting of all white members, was considering laws to enact the Byrd Organization's program of "massive resistance" to desegregation. While there, Marsh met civil rights attorney Oliver Hill, who had also testified against the plan. Hill urged him to go to law school.

After law school, Marsh joined with Samuel W. Tucker to form the law firm of Tucker & Marsh in 1961. They were joined by Hill in 1965 to form Hill, Tucker & Marsh. Marsh concentrated on civil rights law, participating in such cases as Quarles v. Philip Morris, the first U.S. legal case involving racial discrimination in employment, which set the precedent for prohibiting department seniority systems and requiring equal pay for equal work. After that, he successfully litigated more than 20 "employment discrimination cases, most of which were class-action cases, representing thousands of African American and female litigants."

Marsh also worked on school desegregation, beginning with Brewer v. School Board of City of Norfolk, the first of more than 50 school desegregation cases he handled. This case established a precedent requiring jurisdictions to create a desegregation plan, with the locality providing transportation to students.

In Gravely v. Robb (1981), Marsh successfully forced the Virginia General Assembly to adopt single-member districts. This made representation more specific to a district, and enabled the election of more minority candidates.

=== Politics ===
Marsh won election to the Richmond City Council in 1966. The council chose him as vice-mayor in 1970. (At that time, the nine at-large city council members elected the mayor and vice-mayor from among them.)

In the 1970s, activist Curtis Holt St. challenged Richmond's plan to annex more territory from Chesterfield County, as designed to dilute the voting power of African American citizens. A federal district court then ordered the nine council seats assigned to single member wards. After this redistricting in 1977, blacks won five of the nine council seats.

The council then elected Marsh mayor. He became Richmond's first African-American mayor. He continued as mayor until 1982, on the City Council until 1991, when elected to the state senate, as discussed below. During these years (until a citywide referendum passed in 2003 required the mayor to be elected at large), Richmond had a strong council/weak mayor balance of power, and also used a city manager (William Leidinger) to handle day-to-day operations. Marsh led a coalition of black council members, who made substantive changes in the city, starting with Leidinger's replacement by a manager more willing to address minority issues. The new coalition also adopted a human rights ordinance, worked on downtown Richmond's revitalization, and ensured appointment of African Americans to boards and commissions to reflect their contributions to the city.

In 1981, Mayor Marsh hosted the "National Conference on the Black Agenda in the 80s", a conference of African-American federal, state and local officials. The conference drew more than 1,500 attendees to Richmond.

In 1991, Marsh was elected to the State Senate from the newly redistricted 16th Senate district. He had first won a fiercely competitive five-way contest for the Democratic primary nomination. He won re-election five times, rising to become chair of the committee for Courts of Justice, and also served on the committees for Local Government, Finance, Rules, and Transportation. He worked to control easy firearm sales, as well as opposed the growing number of charter schools as undercutting public education. On July 1, 2014, Marsh announced his retirement from the senate (a part-time position).

In 2014, Marsh accepted a gubernatorial appointment to become a commissioner of the Virginia Department of Alcoholic Beverage Control.

=== Other accomplishments ===
Marsh co-founded the Richmond Renaissance and the Metropolitan Economic Development Council. He served as president of the National Black Caucus of Elected Officials and a member of the board of directors of the National League of Cities.

Marsh continued his dedication to education, forming the Support Committee for Excellence in the Public Schools. In addition, he established the New Millennium Leadership Institute, founded the Unity Day Celebration Committee, and hosts Richmond's Annual Juneteenth Celebration. He also served as chairman of the Martin Luther King Jr. Memorial Commission for Virginia.

In 2015, the local courthouse in Richmond's Manchester district was named after Marsh and his brother Harold, who had served as a local judge until being shot to death by a disgruntled tenant of a former client. A new elementary school in Richmond's Church Hill area is named for Marsh.

== Personal life and death ==
Marsh married Diane Harris, and they had three children together. He died on January 23, 2025, at the age of 91.

== See also ==
- List of first African-American mayors
