= Virginia's 16th Senate district =

American legislative district

Virginia's 16th State Senate district
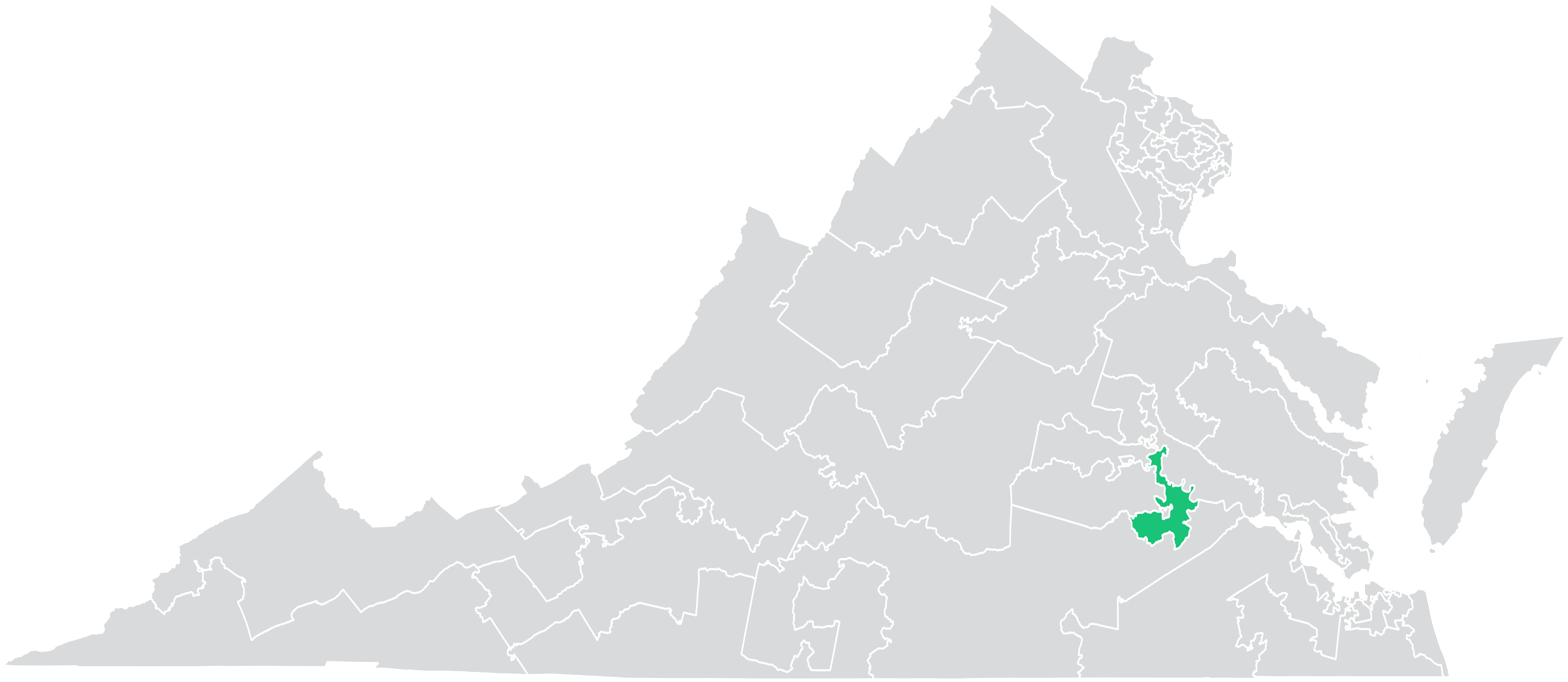
Senator
Schuyler VanValkenburg; D–Henrico
- Demographics: 33% White; 52% Black; 10% Hispanic; 2% Asian; 3% Other
- Population (2017): 215,489
- Registered voters: 134,733

Virginia's 16th Senate district is one of 40 districts in the Senate of Virginia. It has been represented by Democrat Schuyler VanValkenburg since 2024.

== Geography ==
District 16 is a majority-Black district in central Virginia, specifically the Greater Richmond Region, and includes portions of Henrico County.

The district overlaps with Virginia's 1st and 4th congressional districts, and with the 57th, 58th, 59th, and 80th districts of the Virginia House of Delegates.

== Recent election results ==
=== 2023 ===
2023 Virginia Senate election, District 16
Party	Candidate	Votes	%
Democratic	Schuyler VanValkenburg	44,803	54.7
Republican	Siobhan Dunnavant	37,000	45.1
Write-in	Miscellaneous	157	0.2
Total votes		81,960	100
Democratic hold			

Elections prior to 2023 were held under different district boundaries

=== 2019 ===
2019 Virginia Senate election, District 16
Primary election
Party	Candidate	Votes	%
Democratic	Joe Morrissey	8,741	56.0
Democratic	Rosalyn Dance (incumbent)	6,873	44.0
Total votes		15,620	100
General election
Democratic	Joe Morrissey	29,304	63.8
Independent	Waylin Ross	15,725	34.3
Total votes		45,911	100
Democratic hold			

=== 2015 ===
2015 Virginia Senate election, District 16
Primary election
Party	Candidate	Votes	%
Democratic	Rosalyn Dance (incumbent)	4,967	62.0
Democratic	Joseph E. Preston	3,039	37.9
Total votes		8,008	100
General election
Democratic	Rosalyn Dance (incumbent)	17,331	72.7
Independent	Joe Morrissey	6,090	25.5
Total votes		23,849	100
Democratic hold			

=== 2014 special ===
2014 Virginia Senate special election, District 16
Party	Candidate	Votes	%
Democratic	Rosalyn Dance	29,237	73.0
Independent	Preston Brown	10,154	25.4
Total votes		40,036	100
Democratic hold			

=== 2011 ===
2011 Virginia Senate election, District 16
Party	Candidate	Votes	%
Democratic	Henry L. Marsh (incumbent)	16,711	69.0
Independent	Preston Brown	7,391	30.5
Total votes		24,224	100
Democratic hold			

=== Federal and statewide results ===
Year	Office	Results
2020	President	Biden 70.1–28.1%
2017	Governor	Northam 70.2–28.7%
2016	President	Clinton 68.7–27.9%
2014	Senate	Warner 68.7–28.9%
2013	Governor	McAuliffe 67.1–27.0%
2012	President	Obama 72.6–26.6%
2012	Senate	Kaine 72.6–27.4%

== Historical results ==
All election results below took place prior to 2011 redistricting, and thus were under different district lines.

=== 2007 ===
2007 Virginia Senate election, District 16
Party	Candidate	Votes	%
Democratic	Henry L. Marsh (incumbent)	11,186	66.6
Independent	Robert Owens	5,557	33.1
Total votes		16,788	100
Democratic hold			

=== 2003 ===
2003 Virginia Senate election, District 16
Party	Candidate	Votes	%
Democratic	Henry L. Marsh (incumbent)	13,901	99.0
Total votes		14,042	100
Democratic hold			

=== 1999 ===
1999 Virginia Senate election, District 16
Party	Candidate	Votes	%
Democratic	Henry L. Marsh (incumbent)	12,806	98.3
Total votes		13,034	100
Democratic hold			

=== 1995 ===
1995 Virginia Senate election, District 16
Party	Candidate	Votes	%
Democratic	Henry L. Marsh (incumbent)	19,723	99.5
Total votes		19,816	100
Democratic hold			
