= Littleberry J. Haley =

American politician

Member of the Virginia House of Delegates from Louisa County
- In office January 10, 1906 – January 8, 1908
- Preceded by: Robert A. Crawford
- Succeeded by: Carl H. Nolting

Personal details
- Born: Littleberry James Haley; December 6, 1832 Virginia, U.S.
- Died: February 8, 1917 (aged 84) Mineral, Virginia, U.S.
- Party: Democratic
- Spouse: Mary Long
- Education: Richmond College

Military service
- Allegiance: Confederate States
- Branch/service: Confederate States Army
- Battles/wars: American Civil War

Littleberry James Haley (December 6, 1832 – February 8, 1917) was an American minister and politician who served in the Virginia House of Delegates, representing Louisa County.

== Early and family life ==
One of six children borm to William A. Haley (who later moved to Kentucky) and his wife, h Haley graduated from the University of Virginia in 1856/7. He married Mary Long, who bore five sons and a daughter who survived them (albeit most moving outside Louisa County), as well as another daughter who lived marry

== Career ==
Rev Haley served at many churches in Louisa County, including at the Lower Goldmine Baptist Church (the oldest Baptist church in the county), as well as at Little River Baptist Church, South Anna Baptist Church and Trinity Baptist Church

In 1860, Haley bought "Silver Springs" a historic house in the Louisa District, but sold it in 1864. In 1862, Rev. Haley volunteered as chaplain of the Second Corps, Army of Northern Virginia.

In 1906, Louisa County voters elected him as their representative in the Virginia House of Delegates, but he did not seek re-election.

== Death and legacy ==
Haley died, aged 84, in Louisa County, where his surviving daughter lived with her husband, George Cooke, and was buried at the cemetery of the Mineral Baptist Church. His namesake son, Littleberry Haley Jr., moved to Birmingham Alabama, while Dr. Peter Haley moved to Charleston, in what became West Virginia during this man's lifetime, John C. Haley moved to Roanoke, J. Long Haley to Northumberland County, Virginia and William A. Haley moved to Clifton Forge in Allegeny County, Virginia.

Virginia House of Delegates
Preceded by Robert A. Crawford	Virginia Delegate for Louisa County; 1906–1908	Succeeded by Carl H. Nolting
