= David H. Leake =

American lawyer and politician

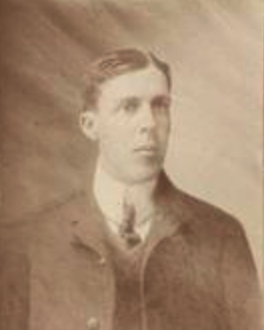

Member of the Virginia House of Delegates for Fluvanna and Goochland
- In office December 4, 1901 – January 13, 1904
- Preceded by: Pembroke Pettit
- Succeeded by: Ernest Alfonso Gray

Personal details
- Born: David Harris Leake; July 13, 1875 Goochland, Virginia, U.S.
- Died: May 8, 1955 (aged 79) Richmond, Virginia, U.S.
- Party: Democratic
- Spouse: Sue Conway Spilman (m. 1909; died 1955)
- Education: Washington and Lee University; University of Virginia

David Harris Leake (July 13, 1875 – May 8, 1955) was an American lawyer and politician who served in the Virginia House of Delegates, representing Fluvanna and Goochland counties, and as general attorney of the Chesapeake and Ohio Railway.

== Early life ==
Leake was born on July 13, 1875 at Midway, the Leake family home in Goochland County, Virginia. He was the eldest son of Judge Andrew Kean Leake (1842–1907) and Juliana Elizabeth Louise (née Harris) Leake (1856–1926). Among his siblings were Jane Margaret Leake Hubard, Louis Knight Leake, Walter Alexander Leake, Charles Lancelot Leake, Catherine Frederica Leake Swindell, and Eliza Overton Leake Cone.

He attended the county schools of Goochland, the Charlotte Hall Military Academy in Maryland, and Washington and Lee University. He attended law school at the University of Virginia.

Through his maternal grandfather, Col. David Bullock Harris of the Confederate Army, he was the great-grandson of Frederick Harris of Fredericks Hall in Louisa County, president of the Louisa Railroad, which became the Virginia Central Railroad (later the C&O). Another great-grandfather was Dr. Andrew Kean, who was a surgeon in the War of 1812.

== Career ==
Leake joined the Chesapeake and Ohio Railway's legal department in 1899 and was appointed general attorney in 1938. He held that post until he retired on June 30, 1947, to become a member of the Advisory Council of the Virginia Railway Association.

== Personal life ==
In 1909, Leake was married to Susan "Sue" Conway Spilman (1882–1970), a daughter of William Mason Spilman and Heningham Lyons (née Scott) Spilman. Together, they were the parents of:

- Heningham Scott Leake (1910–1993)
- Elizabeth Harris Leake (1914–2007), who married Bradford Hastings Walker, president of the Life Insurance Company of Virginia, in 1940. After his death in 1949, she married Vanderbilt family descendant James A. Burden III, eldest son of James A. Burden Jr. and Florence Adele Sloane, in 1951.

Leake died on May 8, 1955 in Richmond, Virginia.

=== Descendants ===
Through his daughter Elizabeth, he was a grandfather of stockbroker Bradford Hasting Walker (who married Pamela Drexel, daughter of John R. Drexel III) and David Hastings Walker, a yacht broker.

Virginia House of Delegates
| Preceded by Pembroke Pettit | Virginia Delegate for Fluvanna and Goochland; 1901–1904 | Succeeded by Ernest A. Gray |
