= Laughton (Kents Store, Virginia) =

Historic house in Virginia, United States

- U.S. National Register of Historic Places
- Virginia Landmarks Register
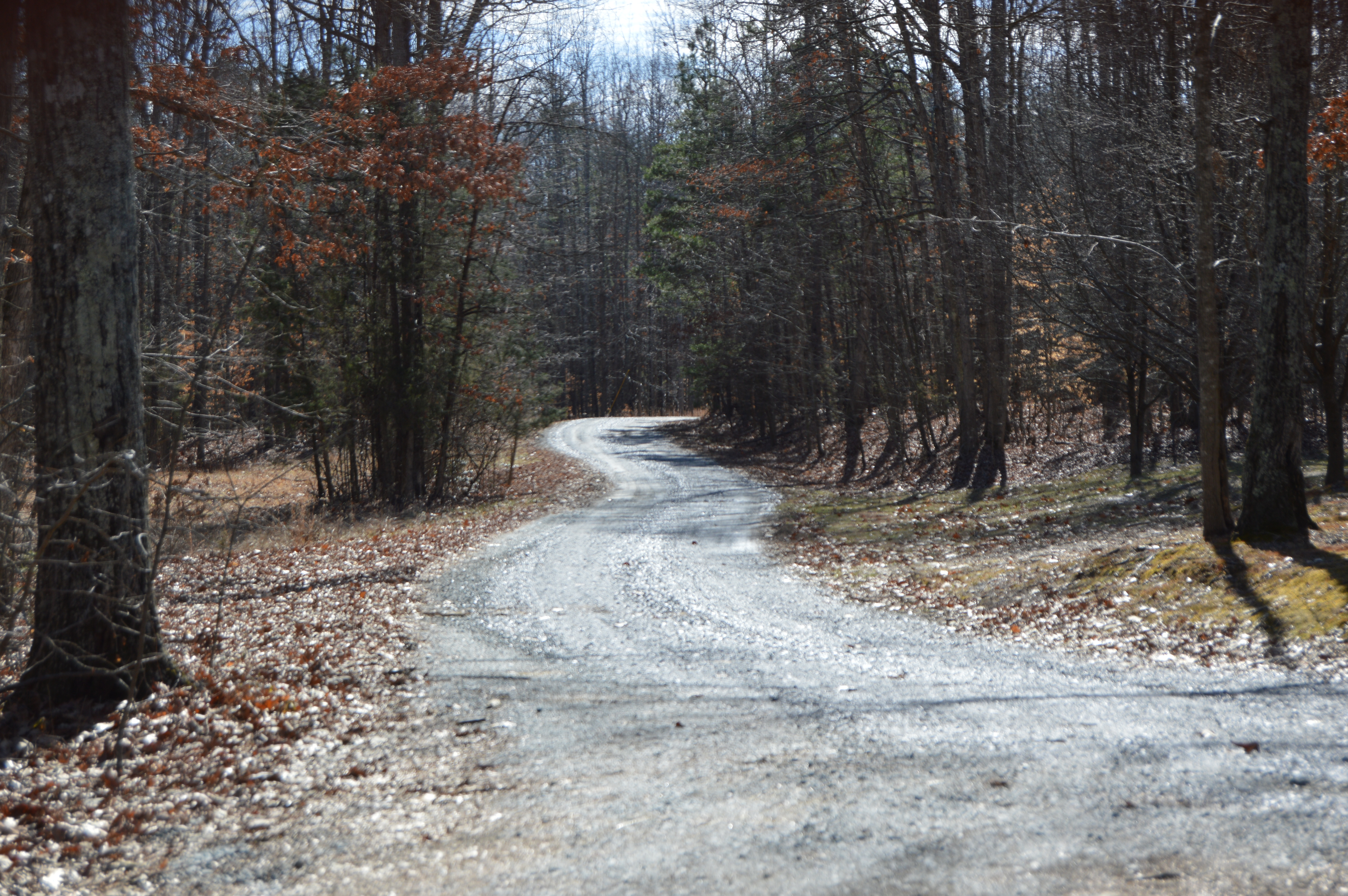
- Entrance to the property

- Location within Virginia Location within the United States
- Location: VA 623, near Kents Store, Virginia
- Coordinates: 37°53′46″N 78°06′46″W
- Area: 27.3 acres (11.0 ha)
- Built: c. 1785–1800, 1836, 1842, 1976
- Architectural style: Federal
- NRHP reference No.: 02000318
- VLR No.: 032-0096

Significant dates
- Added to NRHP: April 1, 2002
- Designated VLR: September 12, 2001

Laughton is a historic home located near Kents Store, Fluvanna County, Virginia. The original section was begun about 1785. It was enlarged near the end of the 18th century, and in 1836, 1842, and 1976. The main section consists of a 1 1/2-story, two bay portion with a two-story, three bay addition. The house features a chimney laid in Flemish bond with double paved weatherings. The house was restored in 1976. Also on the property are the contributing boxwood alley nearly 20 feet tall leading to the front door, the remains of the foundation of an outdoor kitchen incorporated in an herb garden and the Shepherd family cemetery.

It was listed on the National Register of Historic Places in 2002.
