= Anne Ferrell Tata =

American politician from Virginia

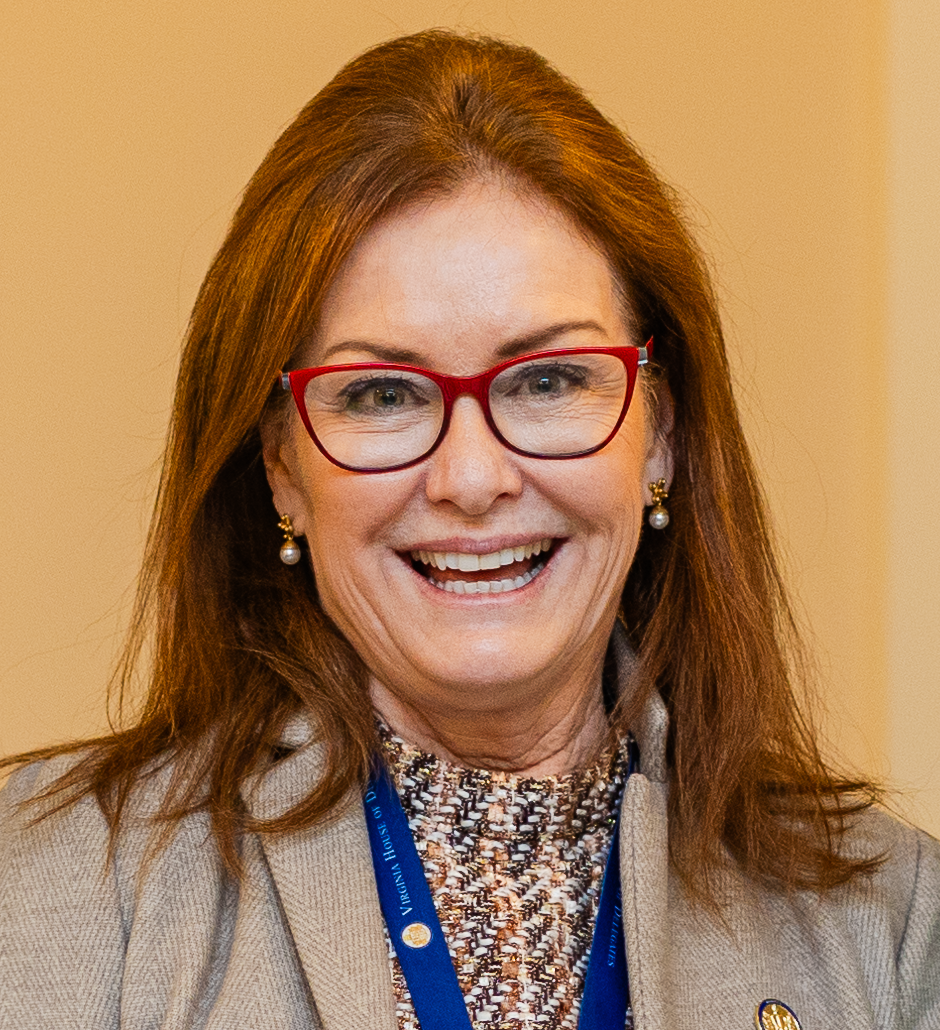
- Anne Tata in 2024

Member of the Virginia House of Delegates
- Incumbent
- Assumed office January 12, 2022
- Preceded by: Jason Miyares
- Constituency: 82nd district (2022–2024); 99th district (2024–Present)

Personal details
- Born: Anne Ferrell Hager Washington, D.C., U.S.
- Party: Republican
- Education: Florida State University (BA)

Anne Ferrell Tata is an American politician who is a member of the Virginia House of Delegates from the 99th district. Elected in November 2021, she assumed office in January 2022.

== Early life and education ==
Tata was born in the Walter Reed Army Medical Center in Washington, D.C. Tata's father was a chaplain in the United States Army, and the family moved frequently around the United States and Europe during her childhood. Tata earned a Bachelor of Arts degree in communication and media studies from Florida State University.

== Career ==
Early in her career, Tata worked as a medical sales representative. She has also been a political fundraiser. She was elected to the Virginia House of Delegates in November 2021 and assumed office in January 2022.

== Personal life ==
Tata's father-in-law was Bob Tata, a former member of the Virginia House of Delegates from the 85th district. Anne Ferrell is married to Robert Tata and they have four children.

Virginia House of Delegates
Preceded by Jason Miyares	Member of the Virginia House of Delegates from the 82nd district 2022–2024	Succeeded by Kim Taylor
Preceded by Margaret Ransone	Member of the Virginia House of Delegates from the 99th district 2024–Present	Incumbent
