= Nathaniel J. Perkins =

American educator and politician

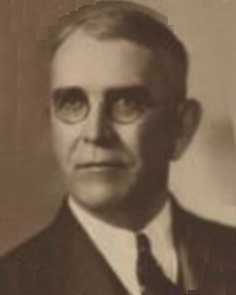

Member of the Virginia House of Delegates for Goochland and Fluvanna
- In office January 8, 1936 – January 14, 1942
- Preceded by: Samuel W. Shelton
- Succeeded by: Henry S. Johnson

Personal details
- Born: Nathaniel James Perkins; March 31, 1887 Carysbrook, Virginia, U.S.
- Died: April 20, 1962 (aged 71) Richmond, Virginia, U.S.
- Party: Democratic
- Spouse(s): Ethel Beard; Elda Wright
- Education: Denison University

Nathaniel James Perkins (March 31, 1887 – April 20, 1962) was an American educator and politician who served as president of Fork Union Military Academy from 1918 to 1930 and as its headmaster from 1930 to 1948. He served from 1936 to 1942 in the Virginia House of Delegates.

== Early life and education ==
Born at Carysbroook in Fluvanna County, Virginia in 1877, he could trace his ancestry back to the Revolutionary War. Perkins was educated at public schools in Fluvanna County, including Palmyra High School. He traveled to Ohio for further studies and received a bachelor's degree from Denison University in 1902.

== Career ==
Perkins became a career educator, albeit at private schools. He became a teacher at Fork Union Military Academy in 1918 and by 1930 held the title of headmaster, which he held until his retirement in 1948. Perkins also served on Virginia's Board of Welfare and Institutions from 1950 until a year before his death, and his Fluvanna County home burned in 1958. Perkins was active in his Baptist Church, Masons, Shriners, Beta Theta Pi and the Sons of the American Revolution.

After delegate David M. Pitts died on January 12, 1936, Fluvanna County voters, together with those from nearby Goochland County, elected Perkins to the Virginia House of Delegates, and re-elected him to that part-time position twice, when reapportionment added Louisa County to the district and he was succeeded by fellow Democrat Henry S. Johnson of Goochland County, then a career public employee.

== Personal life ==
Perkins married Ethel Vernon Beard, and after her death married the widowed Elda Elizabeth Hare.

Virginia House of Delegates
Preceded by Samuel W. Shelton	Virginia Delegate for Goochland and Fluvanna; 1936–1942	Succeeded by Henry S. Johnson
