= John Rutherfoord (judge) =

American lawyer and politician

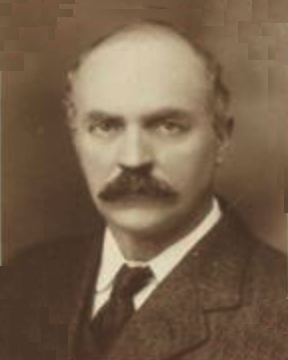
- Official portrait, 1912

Member of the Virginia House of Delegates for Goochland and Fluvanna
- In office January 10, 1912 – January 14, 1914
- Preceded by: Stephen M. Shepherd
- Succeeded by: E. Tucker Hughes

Personal details
- Born: January 31, 1861 Rock Castle, Virginia, U.S.
- Died: November 6, 1942 (aged 81) Washington, D.C., U.S.
- Party: Democratic
- Spouse: Helen Mason Beresford
- Education: University of Virginia

John Rutherfoord (January 31, 1861 – November 6, 1942) was an American lawyer and politician. A native of Goochland County, he represented it and Fluvanna for one term in the Virginia House of Delegates before being nominated to serve as a judge of Virginia's 9th Circuit Court. The son of Delegate John Coles Rutherfoord, his grandfather and namesake, John Rutherfoord, served as Governor of Virginia from 1841 to 1842.

Virginia House of Delegates
Preceded by Stephen M. Shepherd	Virginia Delegate for Goochland and Fluvanna; 1912–1914	Succeeded by E. Tucker Hughes
