= W. Tayloe Murphy Jr. =

American lawyer (1933–2021)

6th Virginia Secretary of Natural Resources
- In office January 14, 2002 – January 14, 2006
- Governor: Mark Warner
- Preceded by: Ron Hamm
- Succeeded by: Preston Bryant

Member of the Virginia House of Delegates
- In office January 13, 1982 – January 12, 2000
- Preceded by: Calvin G. Sanford
- Succeeded by: Albert C. Pollard
- Constituency: 43rd district (1982‍–‍1983); 99th district (1983‍–‍2000)

Personal details
- Born: William Tayloe Murphy Jr. January 9, 1933 Emmerton, Virginia, U.S.
- Died: September 15, 2021 (aged 88)
- Party: Democratic
- Spouse: Helen Turner
- Parent: W. Tayloe Murphy (father)
- Education: Hampden-Sydney College; University of Virginia
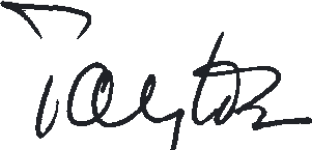
- Signature

Military service
- Branch/service: United States Navy; Naval Reserve
- Years of service: 1954‍–‍1957

William Tayloe Murphy Jr. (January 9, 1933 – September 15, 2021) was a Virginia lawyer and Democratic politician who served part time as a member of the Virginia House of Delegates, representing District 99 (his native Northern Neck) between 1982 and 2000, as well as Secretary of Natural Resources under Governor Mark Warner from 2002 to 2006.

== Early life and education ==
A native of Virginia's Northern Neck, from a long-established family, Murphy was born to Virginia lawyer and 10-term delegate William Tayloe Murphy Sr. and his wife Katherine Bradford Griffith. The younger Murphy attended Warsaw High School and the Virginia Episcopal School, then Hampden-Sydney College. He graduated in 1953. In 1954 he was commissioned an ensign in the United States Naval Reserve and served aboard the USS Newport News and on the staff of the Supreme Allied Commander of NATO. Returning to civilian life, Murphy received an LL.B. degree from the University of Virginia in 1960. While at UVA, Murphy was on the editorial board of the Law Review and was a member of the Raven Society.

He married Helen Turner.

== Career ==
Murphy was admitted to the Virginia bar in 1960, the year his father retired from the General Assembly. The younger Murphy began practicing law with Hunton & Williams in Richmond, then resigned in 1964, two years after his father's death, to practice with Smith, Murphy, and Taliaferro in Warsaw, Virginia. From 1970 until 1982, he served on the Westmoreland County Planning Commission, including some years as chairman, and on the county's Zoning Board of Appeals. From 1980 until 1986, he served on the Virginia State Bar's Executive Council.

Murphy first ran to become the Democratic delegate for what was then called the 47th Virginia House district and included parts of King George, Lancaster, Northumberland and Westmoreland Counties in 1977, but lost to seven-term Republican delegate Calvin G. Sanford, who won 54% of the vote. When Sanford declined to seek election in 1981, Murphy won with 64% of the vote against Republican Lawrence M. Traylor.

The following year (1982), the district was renumbered the 99th after the reapportionment due to the 1980 census, and gained parts of Stafford County. In 1982, 1983, 1985, 1987, and 1989, Murphy ran unopposed for re-election, and handily defeated Independent Edwin B. Garland in 1991. After the 1990 census reapportionment (1992), the 99th district lost its Stafford County portion but gained parts of Essex County. Murphy defeated Republican Sidney M. Peterson in 1993 with 61% of the vote, Republican Henry Lane Hull in 1995 with 57% of the vote, and again ran unopposed in 1997. He announced his legislative retirement in 1999 at age 66, and his legislative assistant Albert C. Pollard Jr. won election to that seat (and last won re-election in 2011).

Murphy's main legislative accomplishment during those 18 years was the passage of the Chesapeake Bay Preservation Act in 1986 and its renewal in 1996, despite the political peril of imposing state authority on local land use decisions in his conservative district. He also sponsored legislation regulating nutrient runoff from agricultural feedlots and boat paint pesticides into Chesapeake Bay. Murphy served on the Chesapeake Bay Commission (1980–1999), including his time as chairman.

After retiring from the legislature, Murphy served as Secretary of Natural Resources under Governor Mark Warner from 2002 to 2006.

Beginning in 1966, Murphy served as Director of Union Bank & Trust Company (now Union Bankshares Corporation), and became Vice Chairman of Union Bankshares Corporation as well as an independent director of that company since 1993. He also served as director of Northern Neck State Bank and on the boards of trustees of Preservation Virginia, the Northern Neck Historical Society, and the Chesapeake Bay Foundation. He continued to work to save the Bay.

His wife Helen Murphy also served on the boards of the Nature Conservancy, Garden Club of Virginia (president 1992–1994), Virginia Department of Historic Resources, Lewis Ginter Botanical Garden, Virginia Outdoors Foundation and Menokin Foundation.

In their semi-retirement, the Murphys worked to preserve Menokin, the historic home of Francis Lightfoot Lee and the surrounding wildlife habitat. They also helped renovate the 1930s era restaurant at Westmoreland State Park (built by the Civilian Conservation Corps) into a conference and environmental education center, which was named for them. He donated his papers to the Virginia Historical Society.

Murphy's Family consisted of his daughter, Anne Murphy Brumley, her husband, Robert Haywood Brumley (3), and their children, Blake Woodson Douglas, Campbell Grayson Brumley, Robert Haywood Brumley (4), and John Tayloe Lewis Brumley.

Virginia House of Delegates
Preceded by J. Samuel Glasscock	Virginia Delegate for the 43rd District; 1982–1983	Succeeded by Gladys B. Keating
Preceded by None	Virginia Delegate for the 99th District; 1983–2000	Succeeded by Albert C. Pollard Jr.
Political offices
Preceded by Ron Hamm	Virginia Secretary of Natural Resources; 2002–2006	Succeeded by Preston Bryant
