= Ernest Alfonso Gray =

American politician (born 1878)

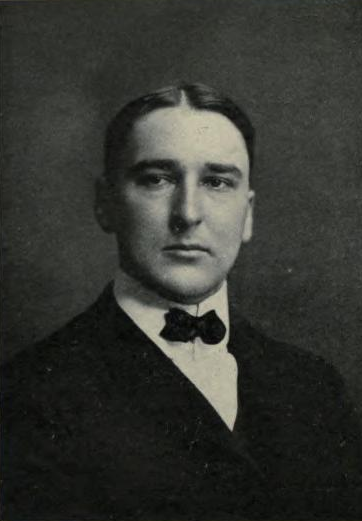
- Gray in 1904 publication

Member of the Virginia House of Delegates from the Fluvanna and Goochland district
- In office January 13, 1904 – March 15, 1904
- Preceded by: David H. Leake
- Succeeded by: Pembroke Pettit

Personal details
- Born: February 14, 1878 Clifton, Fluvanna County, Virginia, U.S.
- Party: Democratic
- Spouse: Manella Cochran (m. 1901)
- Children: 1
- Education: University of Virginia School of Law (LLB)
- Occupation: Politician; lawyer

Ernest Alfonso Gray (born February 14, 1878) was an American politician and lawyer from Virginia. A Democrat, he served as a member of the Virginia House of Delegates, representing Fluvanna and Goochland counties in 1904.

== Early life and education ==
Ernest Alfonso Gray was born on February 14, 1878, in Clifton, Fluvanna County, Virginia, to Betty Ann (née Leftwich) and Alfonso Alexander Gray. He was a descendant of Joel Leftwich, who served as a general in the War of 1812.

His early education was at Central High School and Edgewood High School in Palmyra, Virginia. He studied law at the University of Virginia School of Law starting in 1897. He graduated with a Bachelor of Laws and studied at the private law school of Professor Minor. He was a member of the Chi Phi fraternity.

== Career ==
After graduating, Gray practiced law in Cincinnati, Ohio.

Gray was a Democrat. He served as a member of the Virginia House of Delegates, representing Fluvanna and Goochland counties.

== Personal life ==
Gray married Manella Cochran of Houston, Texas, on September 12, 1901. They had one child, William Alfred. They lived in Richmond.
