= Kimberly Pope Adams =

Virginia politician

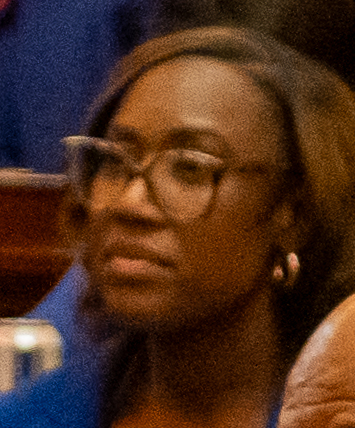

Member of the Virginia House of Delegates from the 82nd district
- Incumbent
- Assumed office January 14, 2026
- Preceded by: Kim Taylor

Personal details
- Born: Hopewell, Virginia
- Party: Democratic
- Education: Virginia Tech

Kimberly Pope Adams is an American politician who is the elected member of the Virginia House of Delegates for the 82nd District. She took office as a member of the 164th Virginia General Assembly on January 14, 2026. She won election on November 4, 2025, defeating Republican incumbent Kim Taylor by a margin of about 9%, a massive swing after losing to Taylor by 53 votes in 2023.

Adams was born and raised in the "Five Forks" area of Hopewell, Virginia. She is the youngest of three daughters. She attended Virginia Tech. She was a CPA and later became an auditor for the State of Virginia.

She was endorsed by Clean Virginia, the Virginia AFL-CIO, Jane Fonda Climate PAC, Planned Parenthood Advocates of Virginia, the Virginia SEIU, the Sierra Club, the Virginia Education Association, the National Organization for Women, the Virginia Association of Firefighters, and the Working Families Party.

== Elections ==
Adams first ran for the House of Delegates in 2023. She won the Democratic primary with 60.69% of the vote. In the general election, Republican incumbent Kim Taylor was found to have won by 78 votes, a margin of 0.27%. Adams called for a recount, which resulted in a final difference of 53 votes between the two, with Taylor still the winner.

Adams ran again in 2025, defeating Taylor in the general election with 18,529 votes, comprising 53.84% of the vote. Taylor received 15,848 votes, or 46.05% of the vote.
