= Carl H. Nolting =

American politician

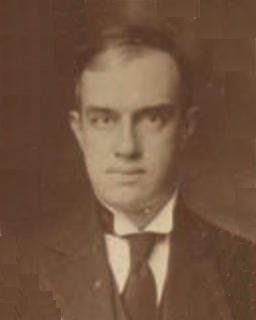

Member of the Virginia House of Delegates from Louisa County
- In office January 8, 1908 – January 10, 1912
- Preceded by: Littleberry J. Haley
- Succeeded by: James M. Baker

Personal details
- Born: Carl Henry Nolting; July 31, 1874 Richmond, Virginia, U.S.
- Died: April 9, 1958 (aged 83) Louisa, Virginia, U.S.
- Party: Democratic
- Education: University of Virginia

Carl Henry Nolting (July 31, 1874 – April 9, 1958) was an American farmer and politician who served two terms in the Virginia House of Delegates, representing Louisa County.

Nolting lived at Brackett's Plantation in Louisa County's Green Springs district (one of five districts in the rural county). Before the Civil War, the Watson family had owned Bracketts since 1798, and operated it using enslaved labor. After the conflict and his father's death (his brother having died after the Battle of Spotsylvania Courthouse somewhat nearby), Thomas Watson (who or his father of the same name may have served a partial term as delegate in 1872) stopped growing tobacco and turned Bracketts into a dairy and grazing farm. Thus, he sold hay/silage to other farmers, as well as butter and milk, and lambs and mutton in the Richmond market. When Watson died without children, H.C. Beattie of Richmond purchased Bracketts, then sold it to Nolting in 1903.

Louisa County voters first elected Nolting to represent them (part time) in the Virginia House of Delegates in 1907, and he won re-election once, thus serving from 1908-1911. Thus, he served twice as long as his immediate predecessor Rev. Littleberry Haley (a Baptist minister for decades who from 1860 until 1864 had lived at Silver Springs in the Louisa district) and his immediate successor James M. Baker (and independent and former Confederate veteran), who also was not re-elected.

A conservationist, Nolting helped raise his niece Elisabeth Nolting (d. 2000), who inherited and moved into Bracketts Plantation in 1958 and became known for her charitable works. Especially beginning in the 1970s, when construction of a proposed prison and diagnostic center threatened the surrounding area, Elisabeth Nolting became a leading figure in creating the Green Springs National Historic Landmark District.

Virginia House of Delegates
Preceded by Littleberry J. Haley	Virginia Delegate for Louisa County; 1908–1912	Succeeded by James M. Baker
