= Dabney Cosby (politician) =

American politician

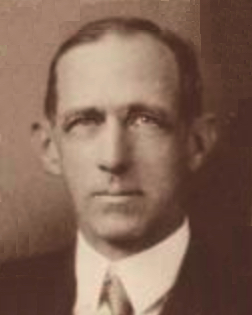
- Official portrait, 1930

Member of the Virginia House of Delegates for Goochland and Fluvanna
- In office January 8, 1930 – January 13, 1932
- Preceded by: George A. Bowles
- Succeeded by: Malcolm W. Perkins

Personal details
- Born: September 23, 1879 Columbia, Virginia, U.S.
- Died: May 15, 1956 (aged 76) Huntington, West Va., U.S.
- Party: Democratic
- Spouse: Eliza Cowherd

Dabney Cosby (September 23, 1879 – May 15, 1956) was an American Democratic politician who served as a member of the Virginia House of Delegates, representing Goochland and his native Fluvanna County.

Virginia House of Delegates
Preceded by George A. Bowles	Virginia Delegate for Goochland and Fluvanna; 1930–1932	Succeeded by Malcolm W. Perkins
