= John G. Luce =

American banker and politician

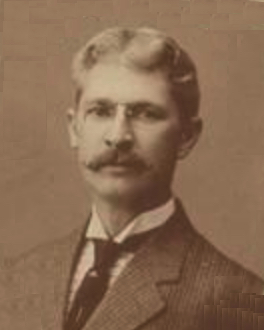
- Official portrait, 1908

Member of the Virginia House of Delegates for Goochland and Fluvanna
- In office January 8, 1908 – January 12, 1910
- Preceded by: Pembroke Pettit
- Succeeded by: Stephen M. Shepherd

Personal details
- Born: John Gilbert Luce; December 16, 1862 Waverly, New York, U.S.
- Died: May 11, 1935 (aged 72) Richmond, Virginia, U.S.
- Party: Democratic
- Spouse: Gertrude Wesley Brown

John Gilbert Luce (December 16, 1862 – May 11, 1935) was an American banker and politician in Virginia. He represented Goochland and Fluvanna counties in the Virginia House of Delegates. He was married to Gertrude Palmer Wesley Luce and has two sons and two daughters.

Virginia House of Delegates
Preceded by Pembroke Pettit	Virginia Delegate for Goochland and Fluvanna; 1908–1910	Succeeded by Stephen M. Shepherd
