= E. Tucker Hughes =

American politician

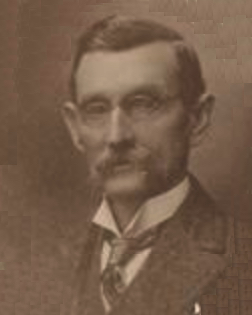
- Official portrait, 1914

Member of the Virginia House of Delegates for Goochland and Fluvanna
- In office January 14, 1914 – January 12, 1916
- Preceded by: John Rutherfoord
- Succeeded by: George A. Bowles

Personal details
- Born: Eldridge Tucker Hughes; March 18, 1846 Fluvanna, Virginia, U.S.
- Died: February 27, 1936 (aged 89) Columbia, Virginia, U.S.
- Party: Democratic
- Spouses: Ann Beverly Perkins (m. 1867; died 1883); Rebekah Davies Poe (m. 1894)

Military service
- Allegiance: Confederate States
- Branch/service: Confederate States Army
- Years of service: 1861–1865
- Unit: 4th Virginia Cavalry
- Battles/wars: American Civil War

Eldridge Tucker Hughes (March 18, 1846 – February 27, 1936) was an American politician who served one term as a member of the Virginia House of Delegates, representing Goochland and Fluvanna counties.

Virginia House of Delegates
| Preceded by John Rutherfoord | Virginia Delegate for Goochland and Fluvanna; 1914–1916 | Succeeded by George A. Bowles |
