= Albert C. Pollard =

American politician

Member of the Virginia House of Delegates from the 99th district
- In office February 20, 2008 – January 11, 2012
- Preceded by: Rob Wittman
- Succeeded by: Margaret Ransone
- In office January 12, 2000 – January 11, 2006
- Preceded by: W. Tayloe Murphy Jr.
- Succeeded by: Rob Wittman

Personal details
- Born: Albert Clarkson Pollard Jr. September 18, 1967 (age 59) Washington, D.C., U.S.
- Party: Democratic
- Children: Mears, Finn, Albert III
- Relatives: John Garland Pollard (great-grandfather)
- Education: Virginia Commonwealth University
- Profession: Businessman, farmer

Albert Clarkson Pollard Jr. (born September 18, 1967) is an American politician. A Democrat, he was a member of the Virginia House of Delegates 2000–2006 and 2008–2012, representing the 99th district on the Northern Neck. Pollard retired after three terms to pursue a private business venture and spend time with his young family. He returned to his seat in a February 2008 special election held to replace Rob Wittman, who had been elected to the United States House of Representatives. He retired again after a fifth term. He is a great-grandson of Virginia Governor John Garland Pollard.
