= Margaret Ransone =

American politician

Member of the Virginia House of Delegates from the 99th district
- In office January 11, 2012 – January 10, 2024
- Preceded by: Albert Pollard
- Succeeded by: Hillary Pugh Kent (Redistricting)

Personal details
- Born: April 24, 1973 (age 53) Richmond, Virginia, U.S.
- Party: Republican
- Spouse: Christopher Todd Ransone
- Children: 2
- Education: Randolph–Macon College
- Occupation: Sales management
- Committees: Agriculture, Chesapeake and Natural Resources; Health, Welfare and Institutions; Privileges and Elections
- Website: www.margaretransone.com

Margaret Bevans Ransone (born April 24, 1973) is a retired American politician. A Republican, she was elected to the Virginia House of Delegates in 2011. She represented the 99th district, made up of the Northern Neck counties of King George, Lancaster, Northumberland, Richmond and Westmoreland, and part of Caroline County.

== Early life and education ==
Ransone was born in Richmond, Virginia and raised in Westmoreland County. She received a B.A. degree from Randolph-Macon College in 2002. She currently works for a family-owned oyster business.

== Political career ==
The 99th district incumbent, Democrat Albert C. Pollard, retired for the second time in 2011. Ransone won a three-way primary for the Republican nomination with 61.25% of the vote. She then defeated Democratic candidate Nicholas C. "Nick" Smith 14,330–6,364.

In 2022, Ransone was promoted to chair of the Privileges and Elections Committee.

== Personal life ==
She is married to Christopher Todd Ransone. They have two children, Ann and Christopher.

== Notes ==
Virginia House of Delegates
Preceded by Albert Pollard	Member of the Virginia House of Delegates from the 99th district 2012–2024	Succeeded by Anne Ferrell Tata
