= Emmett H. Poindexter =

American politician (1892–1945)

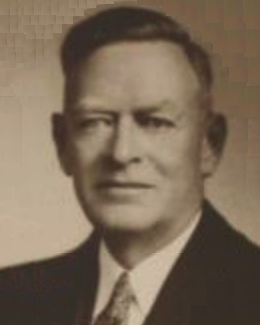

Member of the Virginia House of Delegates from Louisa County
- In office January 12, 1938 – January 12, 1944
- Preceded by: Robert B. Massie
- Succeeded by: Henry S. Johnson

Personal details
- Born: Emmett Hawkins Poindexter; November 6, 1892 Louisa, Virginia, U.S.
- Died: October 21, 1945 (aged 52) Castle Point, New York, U.S.
- Party: Democratic
- Spouse: Ruth Sanne
- Education: Medical College of Virginia

Military service
- Allegiance: United States
- Branch/service: United States Army
- Unit: Medical Corps
- Battles/wars: World War I

Emmett Hawkins Poindexter (November 6, 1892 – October 21, 1945) was an American physician, merchant, and politician. He served in the Virginia House of Delegates from 1938 to 1944, representing his native Louisa County.

== Early life ==
Poindexter was born on November 6, 189,2 at the historic Fredericks Hall in the Cuckoo District of Louisa County, Virginia. His parents were Susan Ann Richardson (1855-1938) and her husband Edward Hawkins Poindexter (1853-1942). Fredericks Hall was owned by the locally prominent Harris family during most of the 19th century. However, after the Civil War, the house was sold and had numerous owners before being purchased by the Poindexters.

Poindexter was educated privately at McGuire's School in Louisiana County. He enrolled in the Medical College of Virginia, where he earned a degree in pharmacy.

== Career ==
Poindexter was a physician and merchant. He served overseas in World War I as Base Hospital 45 with "McGuire Unit". After the war, he formed a business with his father.

He served on the board of directors of the Bank of Louisa, as well as the Louisa Fire Insurance Company and Neighborhood Theatres, Inc. He was a member of the State Highway Commission.

Louisa County voters first elected Poindexter to represent them (part-time) in the Virginia House of Delegates in 1937. He won re-election twice, but resigned after the 1942 regular session, thus serving from 1938 to 1942.

== Personal life ==
Poindexter married Ruth Maxine Sanne. They had a son, Emmett Poindexter Jr., and a daughter, Martha Anne Poindexter. Poindexter lived in the Fredericks Hall house virtually his entire life.

He was a member of the American Legion, the Masons, Acca Temple of the Shrine, and the Commonwealth Club. He was also a member of the Baptist Church.

Poindexter died in the Veterans Hospital in Castle Point, New York, on October 21, 1945, at the age of 51. He was buried at the Bethpage Christian Church cemetery in Louisa County, Virginia.

Virginia House of Delegates
Preceded by Robert B. Massie	Virginia Delegate for Louisa County; 1938–1944	Succeeded by Henry S. Johnson
