= Fenton Bland =

American politician

Member of the Virginia House of Delegates from the 63rd district
- In office January 9, 2002 – January 26, 2005
- Preceded by: Jay DeBoer
- Succeeded by: Rosalyn Dance

Personal details
- Born: Fenton Lee Bland Jr. March 7, 1962 (age 64) Petersburg, Virginia, U.S.
- Party: Democratic
- Spouse: Elisabeth Edwards
- Education: Virginia State University (BS)
- Occupation: Mortician; politician

Fenton Lee Bland Jr. (born March 7, 1962) is an American mortician and former Democratic member of the Virginia House of Delegates. Successful in his first bid for office in 2001, he was subsequently reelected.

Bland resigned in 2005, after pleading guilty to the crime of conspiracy to commit bank fraud which included bilking an elderly man of property and committing forgery to do so. He was released from Federal Correctional Institution, Cumberland after serving 20 months of a 57-month sentence.

Virginia House of Delegates
Preceded by Jay DeBoer	Virginia Delegate for the 63rd District; 2002–2005	Succeeded by Rosalyn Dance
