= Henry S. Johnson =

American educator and politician

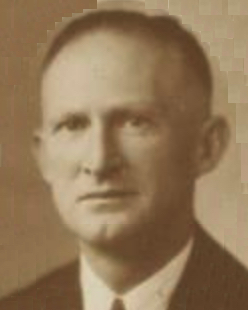

Member of the Virginia House of Delegates for Fluvanna, Goochland, and Louisa
- In office January 14, 1942 – January 14, 1948
- Preceded by: Nathaniel J. Perkins; Emmett H. Poindexter
- Succeeded by: Harold H. Purcell

Personal details
- Born: Henry Satterwhite Johnson; July 10, 1900 Hanover, Virginia, U.S.
- Died: May 23, 1951 (aged 50) Richmond, Virginia, U.S.
- Party: Democratic
- Education: University of Richmond; University of Virginia

Henry Satterwhite Johnson (July 10, 1900 – May 23, 1951) was an American educator and politician who served in the Virginia House of Delegates from 1942 to 1948.

== Early life and education ==
Born in 1900 in Hylas in Goochland County's Dover District to the former Lelia Sattherwhite and her long-lived farmer husband Charles Evander Johnson (1849–1948). While his mother's family had long lived in Goochland County, his father moved there from nearby Hanover County. Johnson was the youngest of at least nine children burn during his parents' long marriage. After receiving a public education locally, Johnson traveled to Richmond and earned a bachelor's degree from the University of Richmond, then a master's degree from the University of Virginia in Charlottesville, as well as took courses from the College of William and Mary and New York University. He married Lucy late in life and had no children. Census forms through 1950 show Johnson lived at Hylas with his slightly older brother Forrest and his family.

== Career ==
Johnson remained a farmer working for his father during World War I, although he registered for the draft. He became a career educator and vocational rehabilitation specialist during a time when Virginia public schools were segregated. In 1940, at the beginning of World War II, Johnson lived with his elderly father as well as older brother Forrest Johnson and his wife and son (this man's nephew). When registering for the draft in 1940 (during World War II), this Johnson listed his employer as the Virginia Department of Education, although the census form specified that his job as involving vocational rehabilitation. During the 1930s, federal courts were beginning to realize that Black teachers and other professionals were paid less and taught at inferior schools. By 1950, after leaving the legislature as described below, Johnson described his job as public relations for the Medical Society of Virginia, and his obituary the next year listed his title as executive secretary/treasurer.

Goochland County voters, together with those from nearby Louisa and Fluvanna Counties, first elected Johnson to the Virginia House of Delegates in 1942, and re-elected him to that part-time position until 1947, when he was succeeded by fellow Democrat Harold H. Purcell, a lawyer recently returned from wartime service and who would serve in both houses of the Virginia General Assembly before becoming a judge.

== Death and legacy ==
Johnson died at a Richmond hospital in 1951, at the beginning of Virginia's Massive Resistance crisis, survived by his widow, five sisters and three brothers, and was buried at Berea Baptist Church in Hanover County.

Virginia House of Delegates
Preceded by Nathaniel J. Perkins	Virginia Delegate for Goochland and Fluvanna; 1942–1948	Succeeded by Harold H. Purcell
Preceded by Emmett H. Poindexter	Virginia Delegate for Louisa County; 1944–1948	Succeeded by Harold H. Purcell
