= James M. Baker (Virginia politician) =

American politician

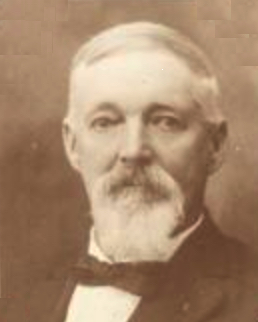

Member of the Virginia House of Delegates from Louisa County
- In office January 10, 1912 – January 14, 1914
- Preceded by: Carl H. Nolting
- Succeeded by: R. Lindsay Gordon Jr.

Personal details
- Born: James Mansfield Baker; April 19, 1845
- Died: November 9, 1927 (aged 82)
- Party: Democratic
- Spouse: Mary Louise Woolfolk

Military service
- Allegiance: Confederate States
- Branch/service: Confederate States Army
- Battles/wars: American Civil War

James Mansfield Baker (April 19, 1845 – November 9, 1927) was an American politician who served in the Virginia House of Delegates, representing Louisa County.

Virginia House of Delegates
| Preceded by Carl H. Nolting | Virginia Delegate for Louisa County; 1912–1914 | Succeeded by R. Lindsay Gordon Jr. |
