= Robert B. Massie =

American politician

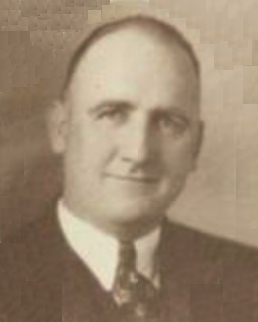

Member of the Virginia House of Delegates from Louisa County
- In office January 8, 1936 – January 12, 1938
- Preceded by: John Q. Rhodes Jr.
- Succeeded by: Emmett H. Poindexter

Personal details
- Born: Robert Bryan Massie; October 13, 1896 Louisa, Virginia, U.S.
- Died: September 5, 1961 (aged 64) Louisa, Virginia, U.S.
- Party: Democratic
- Spouse: Jessie Wright

Military service
- Allegiance: United States
- Battles/wars: World War I

Robert Bryan Massie (October 13, 1896 – September 5, 1961) was an American politician who served in the Virginia House of Delegates, representing his native Louisa County.

Virginia House of Delegates
Preceded by John Q. Rhodes Jr.	Virginia Delegate for Louisa County; 1936–1938	Succeeded by Emmett H. Poindexter
