= Samuel W. Shelton =

American lawyer and politician

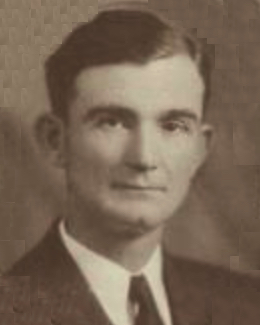
- Official portrait, 1934

Member of the Virginia House of Delegates for Goochland and Fluvanna
- In office January 10, 1934 – January 8, 1936
- Preceded by: Malcolm W. Perkins
- Succeeded by: Nathaniel J. Perkins

Personal details
- Born: Samuel William Shelton; June 22, 1890 Hanover, Virginia, U.S.
- Died: December 22, 1974 (aged 84) Richmond, Virginia, U.S.
- Party: Democratic
- Spouse: Phyllis Crawford
- Education: University of Richmond

Military service
- Allegiance: United States
- Branch/service: United States Army
- Rank: Private
- Battles/wars: World War I

Samuel William Shelton (June 22, 1890 – December 22, 1974) was an American lawyer and politician. After one term in the Virginia House of Delegates, he was appointed by Abram P. Staples as an assistant attorney general of Virginia. He previously served as commonwealth's attorney of Fluvanna County from 1926 to 1934.

Virginia House of Delegates
Preceded by Malcolm W. Perkins	Virginia Delegate for Goochland and Fluvanna; 1934–1936	Succeeded by Nathaniel J. Perkins
