= Joseph E. Preston =

American politician (born 1956)

Member of the Virginia House of Delegates from the 63rd district
- In office January 14, 2015 – January 13, 2016
- Preceded by: Rosalyn Dance
- Succeeded by: Lashrecse Aird

Personal details
- Born: Joseph Edward Preston; November 30, 1956 (age 69) Omaha, Nebraska, U.S.
- Party: Democratic
- Education: Morehouse College (BA); Howard University (JD)

Joseph Edward Preston (born November 30, 1956) is an American attorney and politician from the Commonwealth of Virginia. A member of the Democratic Party, Preston represented the 63rd district in the Virginia House of Delegates.

== Early life and education ==
Preston was born in Omaha, Nebraska and graduated from Omaha Central High School. He earned a Bachelor of Arts degree from Morehouse College and a Juris Doctor from the Howard University School of Law.

== Career ==
Preston ran in the Democratic Party primary election for the 63rd district seat in the Virginia House of Delegates in 1991 and 1993 against incumbent Jay DeBoer, but lost both times. He ran again in a special election, held in January 2015, to fill the seat of Rosalyn Dance, a Democrat who was elected to the Virginia State Senate. Preston then challenged Dance in the June 2015 primary election for the State Senate seat and was defeated.

== Personal life ==
Preston lives in Petersburg, Virginia.

== Electoral history ==
Date	Election	Candidate	Party	Votes	%
Virginia House of Delegates, 63rd district
Sep 11, 1991	Primary	Jay W. DeBoer	Democratic	3,717	53.43
Sep 11, 1991	Primary	Joseph E. Preston	Democratic	2,279	32.76
Sep 11, 1991	Primary	Florence S. Farley	Democratic	961	13.81
Jun 8, 1993	Primary	Jay W. DeBoer	Democratic	3,167	57.95
Jun 8, 1993	Primary	Joseph E. Preston	Democratic	2,298	42.05
Jan 6, 2015	Special	Joseph E. Preston	Democratic	1,213	78.61
Jan 6, 2015	Special	William H. Jones, Jr.	Independent	285	18.47
Jan 6, 2015	Special	Write Ins		45	2.91
Jan 6, 2015	Special	Rosalyn Dance was elected to the Senate; seat stayed Democratic			
Virginia Senate, 16th district
Jun 9, 2015	Primary	Rosalyn R. Dance	Democratic	4,967	62.04
Jun 9, 2015	Primary	Joseph E. Preston	Democratic	3,039	37.96
