= George W. Browning =

American politician

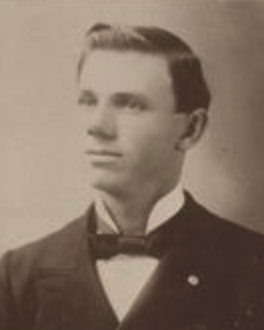

Member of the Virginia House of Delegates for Fluvanna and Goochland
- In office December 1, 1897 – December 6, 1899
- Preceded by: James McClellan Miller
- Succeeded by: Pembroke Pettit

Personal details
- Born: George Wilber Browning; September 18, 1870 Goochland, Virginia, U.S.
- Died: January 31, 1961 (aged 90) Goochland, Virginia, U.S.
- Party: Democratic
- Spouse: Nannie Duke

George Wilber Browning (September 18, 1870 – January 31, 1961) was an American politician who represented Goochland and Fluvanna counties in the Virginia House of Delegates.

Virginia House of Delegates
Preceded by James McClellan Miller	Virginia Delegate for Fluvanna and Goochland; 1897–1899	Succeeded by Pembroke Pettit
