= The Oaks (Kents Store, Virginia) =

Historic house in Virginia, United States

- U.S. National Register of Historic Places
- Virginia Landmarks Register
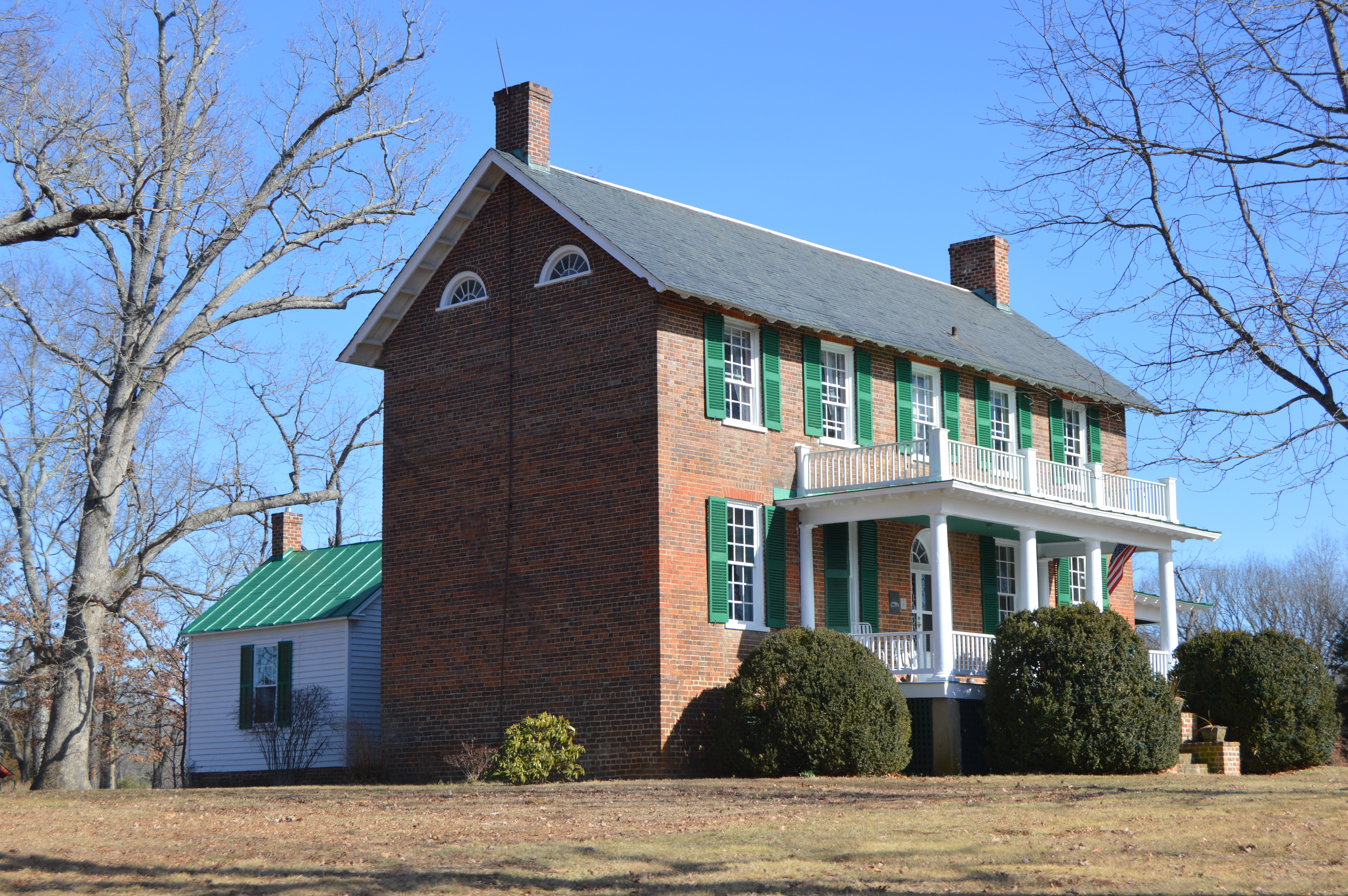
- Front and western side

- Location within Virginia Location within the United States
- Location: 5025 Tabscott Rd., near Kents Store, Virginia
- Coordinates: 37°52′24″N 78°05′09″W
- Area: 170 acres (69 ha)
- Built: 1809-1830, c. 1915
- Architectural style: Federal
- NRHP reference No.: 01000696
- VLR No.: 032-0022

Significant dates
- Added to NRHP: July 13, 2001
- Designated VLR: March 14, 2001

The Oaks is a historic home located near Kents Store, Fluvanna County, Virginia. It was built between about 1809 and 1830. The rear ell is the original section, and is a two-story, brick structure. In 1830 the brick, single pile, two-story structure over a raised basement was built onto the south. The house has a slate covered gable roof. A small one-story weatherboard addition was built onto the rear about 1915. Also on the property are the contributing outdoor kitchen (later used as a schoolroom), a smokehouse, an icehouse, a latticed covered well, a barn, and the large Richardson/Bowles family cemetery.

It was listed on the National Register of Historic Places in 2001.
