= Virginia's 99th House of Delegates district =

Virginia legislative district

Virginia's 99th State House of Delegates district
- District map from the 2023 election
Delegate
Anne Ferrell Tata; R–Virginia Beach
- Demographics: 76.1% White; 9.8% Black; 7.3% Hispanic; 3.2% Asian; 3.0% Other
- Population (2020): 84,462
- Registered voters (2024): 64,316

Virginia's 99th House of Delegates district elects one of the 100 members of the Virginia House of Delegates, the lower house of the state's bicameral legislature. Before the 2023 elections, the district was made up of the counties of King George, Lancaster, Northumberland, Richmond, Westmoreland, and part of Caroline County. Other than King George, the combined area is called the Northern Neck of Virginia. After redistricting, the district is solely made up of parts of Virginia Beach.

The 99th district has been represented by Republican Anne Ferrell Tata since 2024.

== List of delegates ==
Delegate	Party	Years	Electoral history
W. Tayloe Murphy Jr.	Democratic	January 12, 1983 – January 12, 2000	Did not seek reelection
Albert C. Pollard	Democratic	January 12, 2000 – January 11, 2006	Did not seek reelection
Rob Wittman	Republican	January 11, 2006 – December 11, 2007	Elected to U.S. House
Albert C. Pollard	Democratic	February 20, 2008 – January 11, 2012	Did not seek reelection
Margaret Ransone	Republican	January 11, 2012 – 2024	First elected in 2011
Anne Ferrell Tata	Republican	2024 – present	First elected in 2021
