= Kents Store, Virginia =

Unincorporated community in Virginia, United States

Coordinates: 37°52′46″N 78°07′44″W

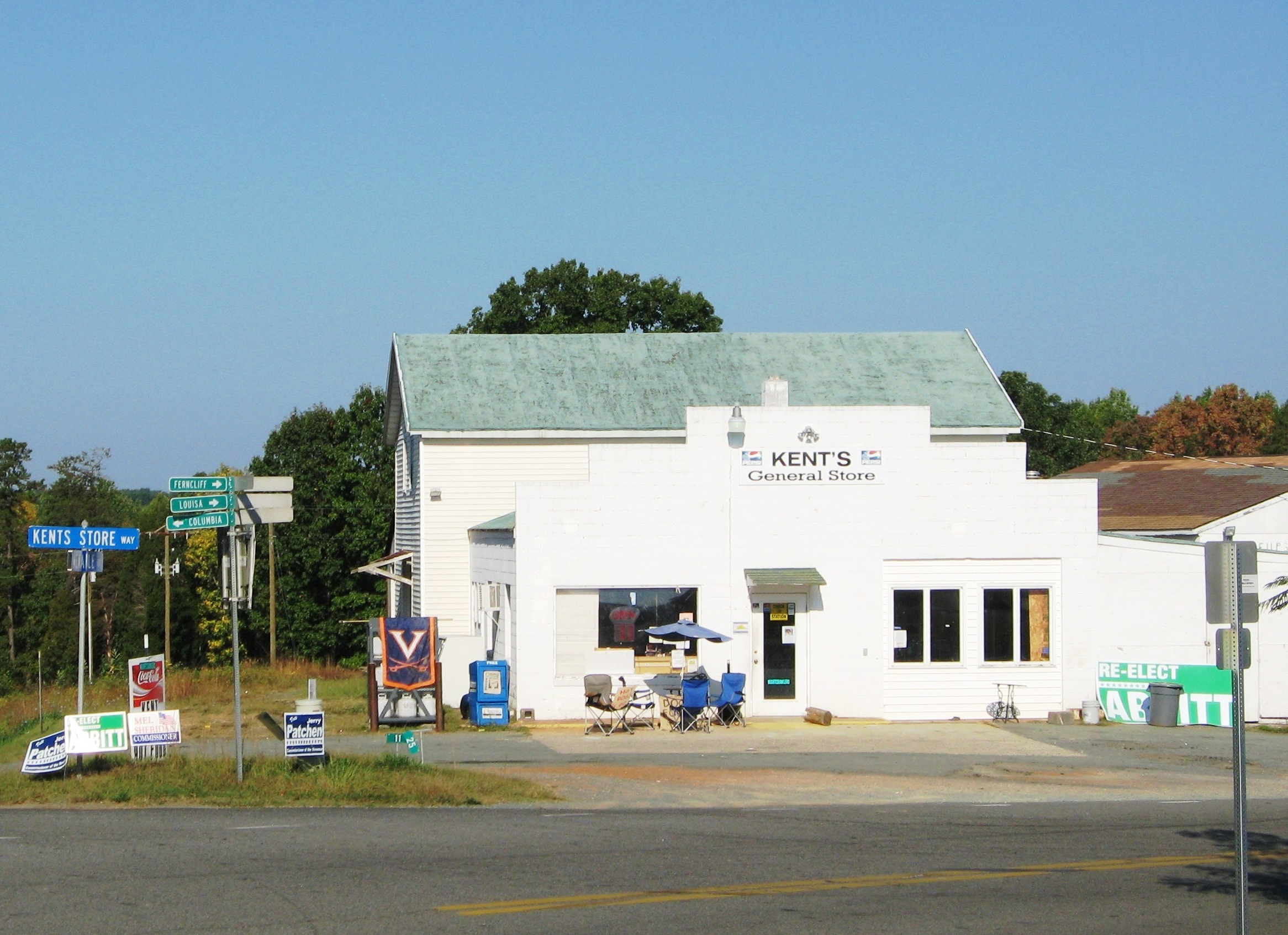
Kents General Store in Kents Store

Kents Store is an unincorporated community in Fluvanna County, in the U.S. state of Virginia.

Laughton and The Oaks are listed on the National Register of Historic Places.
