= Rosalyn Dance =

American politician (born 1948)

Rosalyn Randolph Dance
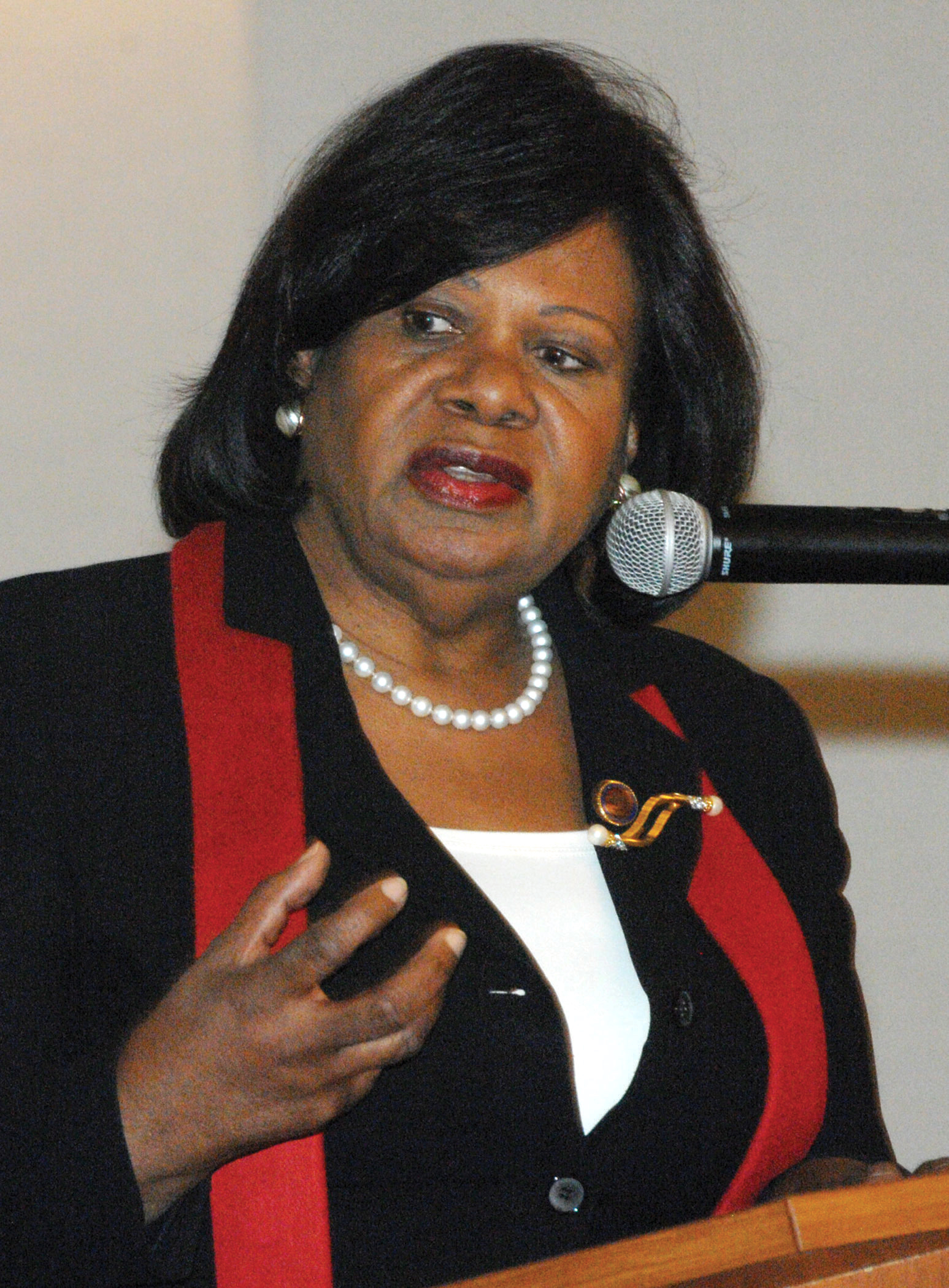

Vice-Chairman of the Virginia Department of Elections
- Incumbent
- Assumed office March 14, 2023
- Appointed by: Glenn Youngkin
- Chairman: John O'Bannon

Member of the Virginia Senate from the 16th district
- In office November 9, 2014 – January 8, 2020
- Preceding: Henry L. Marsh
- Succeeded by: Joe Morrissey

Member of the Virginia House of Delegates from the 63rd district
- In office April 6, 2005 – November 9, 2014
- Preceded by: Fenton Bland
- Succeeded by: Joseph E. Preston

Personal details
- Born: Rosalyn Odessa Randolph; February 10, 1948 (age 78) Chesterfield, Virginia
- Party: Democratic
- Spouse: Nathaniel Alfonso Dance Jr.
- Children: Nathaniel III; Tanya
- Education: John Tyler Community College (ASN); Virginia State University (BSN); Virginia Commonwealth University (MPA)
- Profession: Nurse
- Committees: Appropriations; General Laws; Privileges and Elections

Rosalyn Randolph Dance (born February 10, 1948) is an American politician and retired nurse who is currently serving as Vice-Chairman of the Virginia Department of Elections. A member of the Democratic Party, she served in the Senate of Virginia from 2014 until 2020, in the Virginia House of Delegates from 2005 to 2014, and was Mayor of Petersburg, Virginia from 1992 to 2004.

== Early Life & Education ==
Dance was one of 11 children. She dropped out of high school, but went on to earn earn a nursing degree summa cum laude from Virginia State University and a master's in public administration from Virginia Commonwealth University. Dance worked as a nurse for 34 years, retiring in 2000.

== Political Career ==
Dance was elected to the Petersburg City Council in 1992.

In 2001, the 63rd Virginia House of Delegates district incumbent, Democrat Jay DeBoer, retired after 18 years. Dance, then mayor of Petersburg, ran for the seat as an independent but lost to the Democratic nominee, funeral director Fenton Bland.

On January 25, 2005, Bland pleaded guilty in federal court to a charge of conspiracy to commit bank fraud; he resigned the 63rd district seat the next day. Dance received the Democratic nomination and was chosen to replace Bland in a special election on March 22. The 63rd district is southeast of Richmond, made up of the city of Petersburg and part of Hopewell, plus parts of Chesterfield, Dinwiddie and Prince George Counties. Dance was reelected multiple times, the last in November 2013.

Dance served on the House committees on Appropriations, General Laws, Health, Welfare and Institutions, and Privileges and Elections.

Dance served in the Senate of Virginia, where she represented District 16, having won a special election on November 4, 2014, to fill the seat once held by Henry L. Marsh.

In 2019, Dance sponsored a bill to gradually increase Virginia's minimum wage from $7.25 an hour to $15 per hour by 2021. Later that year, she ran for reelection to her state senate seat, but was defeated in the primary by disbarred attorney Joe Morrissey.

In 2023, Governor Glenn Youngkin nominated Dance to become Vice-Chairman of the Virginia Department of Elections.

Date	Election	Candidate	Party	Votes	%
Virginia House of Delegates, 63rd district
November 6, 2001	General	Fenton Bland	Democratic	8,774	52.48
November 6, 2001	General	Rosalyn Dance	Independent	7,926	47.40
November 6, 2001	General	Write Ins		20	0.12
March 22, 2005	Special	Rosalyn Dance	Democratic	4,342	68.78
March 22, 2005	Special	A G Sims	Republican	1,690	26.77
March 22, 2005	Special	M W Bratschi	Independent	271	4.29
March 22, 2005	Special	Write Ins		10	0.16
March 22, 2005	Special	Fenton Bland resigned; seat stayed Democratic			
November 8, 2005	General	Rosalyn Dance	Democratic	9,456	60.29
November 8, 2005	General	D H Dphrepaulezz	Independent	6,177	39.38
November 8, 2005	General	Write Ins		52	0.33
November 6, 2007	General	Rosalyn Dance	Democratic	8,684	98.07
November 6, 2007	General	Write Ins		170	1.92
November 3, 2009	General	Rosalyn Dance	Democratic	12,375	96.42
November 3, 2009	General	Write Ins		459	3.57
November 8, 2011	General	Rosalyn Dance	Democratic	10,775	96.64
November 8, 2011	General	Write Ins		374	3.35
June 11, 2013	Democratic primary	Rosalyn Dance		2,471	52.82
June 11, 2013	Democratic primary	Evandra D. Thompson		2,207	47.18
November 5, 2013	General	Rosalyn Dance	Democratic	15,962	95.72
November 5, 2013	General	Write Ins		714	4.28
Senate of Virginia, 16th district
August 9, 2014	Special primary	Rosalyn Dance		1,725	45.4
August 9, 2014	Special primary	Delores McQuinn		1,375	36.2
August 9, 2014	Special primary	Rudy McCollum		592	15.6
August 9, 2014	Special primary	Gerry Rawlinson		108	2.8
November 4, 2014	Special general	Rosalyn Dance	Democratic	29,237	73.0
November 4, 2014	Special general	Preston "Famous" Brown	Independent	10,154	25.4
November 4, 2014	Special general	Write Ins		645	1.6
November 4, 2014	Special general	Henry L. Marsh resigned; seat stayed Democratic			
June 9, 2015	Democratic Primary	Rosalyn Dance		4,967	62.0
June 9, 2015	Democratic Primary	Joseph E. Preston		3,039	37.9
June 9, 2015	Democratic Primary	Write Ins		2	0.0
November 3, 2015	General election	Rosalyn Dance	Democratic	17,331	72.7
November 3, 2015	General election	Joe Morrissey	Independent	6,090	25.5
November 3, 2015	General election	Write Ins		428	1.8
June 11, 2019	Democratic primary	Joe Morrissey		8,741	55.0
June 11, 2019	Democratic primary	Rosalyn Dance		6,873	44.0
June 11, 2019	Democratic primary	Write Ins		6	0.0

== See also ==
- List of mayors of Petersburg, Virginia
