= George Browning (cricketer) =

Australian cricketer

Personal information
- Born: 12 December 1858; Hepburn, Colony of Victoria
- Died: 9 October 1900 (aged 41); North Carlton, Victoria, Australia

Domestic team information
- Years: Team
- 1884-1885: Victoria
- Source: Cricinfo, 24 July 2015

George Browning (12 December 1858 – 9 October 1900) was an Australian cricketer. He played three first-class cricket matches for Victoria between 1884 and 1885.

== See also ==
- List of Victoria first-class cricketers
