= Virginia's 63rd House of Delegates district =

Virginia legislative district

District map from the 2023 election

Virginia's 63rd House of Delegates district elects one of 100 seats in the Virginia House of Delegates, the lower house of the state's bicameral legislature. District 63 represents the city of Petersburg as well as part of the city of Hopewell and parts of the counties of Chesterfield, Dinwiddie, and Prince George. The seat is currently held by Kim Taylor.

== List of delegates ==
Delegate	Party	Years	Electoral history
Jay DeBoer	Democratic	January 12, 1983 – January 9, 2002	Did not seek reelection
Fenton Bland	Democratic	January 9, 2002 – January 26, 2005	Resigned
Rosalyn Dance	Democratic	April 6, 2005 – November 9, 2014	Won election to Senate
Joseph E. Preston	Democratic	January 14, 2015 – January 13, 2016	Ran for Senate
Lashrecse Aird	Democratic	January 13, 2016 – January 12, 2022	Defeated in bid for reelection
Kim Taylor	Republican	January 12, 2022 – present	First elected in 2021
