= Matt Lohr =

American politician (born 1971)

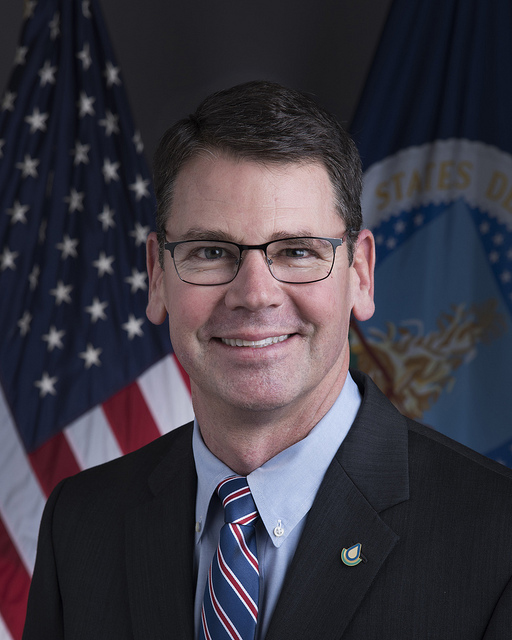

5th Virginia Secretary of Agriculture and Forestry
- In office January 15, 2022 – January 17, 2026
- Governor: Glenn Youngkin
- Preceded by: Bettina Ring
- Succeeded by: Katie Frazier

Chief of the Natural Resources Conservation Service
- In office December 5, 2018 – January 20, 2021
- President: Donald Trump
- Leader: Sonny Perdue
- Preceded by: Jason Weller
- Succeeded by: Terry Cosby

Commissioner of the Virginia Department of Agriculture and Consumer Services
- In office May 1, 2010 – December 13, 2013
- Governor: Bob McDonnell
- Preceded by: Todd Haymore
- Succeeded by: Sandra Adams

Member of the Virginia House of Delegates from the 26th district
- In office January 11, 2006 – April 30, 2010
- Preceded by: Glenn Weatherholtz
- Succeeded by: Tony Wilt

Personal details
- Born: August 28, 1971 (age 55) Harrisonburg, Virginia, U.S.
- Party: Republican
- Spouse(s): Andrea Lynch Lohr (1995–2011; her death)
- Children: 2
- Education: Virginia Tech
- Occupation: farmer, politician, and motivational speaker

Matthew James Lohr (born August 28, 1971) is an American politician. On January 15, 2022 Lohr was sworn in by Governor Glenn Youngkin as Virginia's 5th Secretary of Agriculture and Forestry. In this role, he will serve in the governor's cabinet and oversee the Virginia Department of Agriculture and Consumer Services, the Virginia Department of Forestry, and the Virginia Racing Commission. December 3, 2018 he was appointed by Secretary of Agriculture Sonny Perdue as the Chief of the Natural Resources Conservation Service, he served until January 20, 2021. Lohr served in the Virginia House of Delegates from 2006–2010, representing the 26th district in the Shenandoah Valley, made up of the city of Harrisonburg and part of Rockingham County. From May 1, 2010 until December 16, 2013, he served as the 14th Commissioner of the Virginia Department of Agriculture and Consumer Services under Governor Robert F. McDonnell. From December 2013 until June 2017, Lohr worked for Farm Credit of the Virginias as director of the Knowledge Center. In this position he facilitated the sharing of knowledge and resources for the betterment of all farmers.

Lohr is a member of the Republican Party.

While in the House, Lohr served on the committees of Agriculture, Chesapeake and Natural Resources; Counties, Cities and Towns; and Finance. He also served as chairman of the Agriculture Subcommittee. During his time in office, he was presented "Legislator of the Year" awards from the Virginia Career and Technical Education Association and the Virginia Economic Development Association. In 2003 he won the American Farm Bureau "Excellence in Agriculture" Award as well as numerous farming and environmental stewardship honors.

== Electoral history ==
Date	Election	Candidate	Party	Votes	%
Virginia House of Delegates, 26th district
Nov 8, 2005	General	M J Lohr	Republican	8,545	53.58
Nov 8, 2005	General	L L Fulk	Democratic	7,353	46.11
Nov 8, 2005	General	Write Ins		50	0.31
Nov 8, 2005	General	Glenn Weatherholtz retired; seat stayed Republican			
Nov 6, 2007	General	Matthew J. "Matt" Lohr	Republican	8,166	71.07
Nov 6, 2007	General	Carolyn W. Frank		3,269	28.45
Nov 6, 2007	General	Write Ins		55	0.47
Nov 3, 2009	General	Matthew J. "Matt" Lohr	Republican	11,328	73.03
Nov 3, 2009	General	A. Gene Hart, Jr.	Democratic	4,170	26.88
Nov 3, 2009	General	Write Ins		12	0.07
