= Bettina Ring =

American agricultural expert

4th Virginia Secretary of Agriculture and Forestry
- In office January 13, 2018 – January 15, 2022
- Governor: Ralph Northam
- Preceded by: Basil Gooden
- Succeeded by: Matt Lohr

State Forester of Virginia
- In office May 2014 – January 13, 2018
- Governor: Terry McAuliffe
- Preceded by: Carl E. Garrison III
- Succeeded by: Rob Farrell

Personal details
- Born: Bettina Kay Ring; October 16, 1963 (age 63) Hopewell, Virginia, U.S.
- Education: Virginia Tech; James Madison University

Bettina Kay Ring (born October 16, 1963) is an American agricultural expert who served as Virginia Secretary of Agriculture and Forestry under Governor Ralph Northam from 2018 to 2022. She previously served as the Virginia State Forester under Governor Terry McAuliffe from 2014 to 2018.

== Background ==
Ring graduated from Virginia Tech with a degree in Forestry and Wildlife in 1986. She went onto join the Virginia Department of Forestry, where she initially worked as an area forester. Early in her career, Ring did work in Greene County and northwestern Albemarle County. In 2001, she earned a Master of Business Administration from James Madison University. The same year, she left the Department of Forestry, having attained the rank of Deputy State Forester during her fourteen-year tenure there.

Relocating to the western United States, Ring then transitioned into non-profit work, serving in senior positions at the Colorado Coalition of Land Trusts, the Wilderness Land Trust and the Bay Area Open Space Council. In May 2012, Ring joined the American Forest Foundation in Washington D.C., where she served as Senior Vice President of Family Forests and oversaw the American Tree Farm System.

Ring also co-founded the Virginia Natural Resources Leadership Institute.

== McAuliffe administration ==
In 2014, Ring was appointed Virginia State Forester by Governor Terry McAuliffe. Under Ring's leadership, the Virginia Department of Forestry sent over 100 first responders to assist in out of state emergencies throughout 2017, including a group of twenty who were sent to Texas in the aftermath of Hurricane Harvey. During her tenure as State Forester, Ring also led the National Association of State Foresters' legislative committee.

Political offices
Preceded by Carl E. Garrison III	Virginia State Forester; 2014-2018	Succeeded by Incumbent
Preceded by Basil Gooden	Virginia Secretary of Agriculture and Forestry; 2018–present	Succeeded by Incumbent
