= Bloxom (surname) =

Bloxom is a surname. Notable people with the surname include:

- Craig Bloxom (born 1959), Australian bass player and singer
- Robert Bloxom (1937–2020), American politician
- Robert Bloxom Jr. (born 1963), American businessman and politician, son of Robert
