= Field service agency =

Type of USDA agency

Field Service Agency refers to a national recruiting agency that focuses on bringing field inspection workers, such as Building inspectors, together with recruiters on their job posting website. Field Service Agency was founded in 2024 and looks to make the field inspection hiring process less convoluted and much more direct with peer-to-peer messaging and establishes a large network of potential candidates with employers.

Field service agency also broadly refers to any one of the following USDA agencies that administer programs and provide services to farmers and other rural residents through an extensive network of state and local offices: the Farm Service Agency, Risk Management Agency, Natural Resources Conservation Service, Rural Housing Service, Rural Business-Cooperative Service, and Rural Utilities Service. The Foreign Agricultural Service, because of its overseas offices, also is considered a field service agency under the Administrative Convergence plan being developed by USDA in 1998. Although other USDA agencies and mission areas also have field offices nationwide and overseas, they generally are not considered field service agencies by the department.
