= Tony Wilt =

American politician (born 1961)

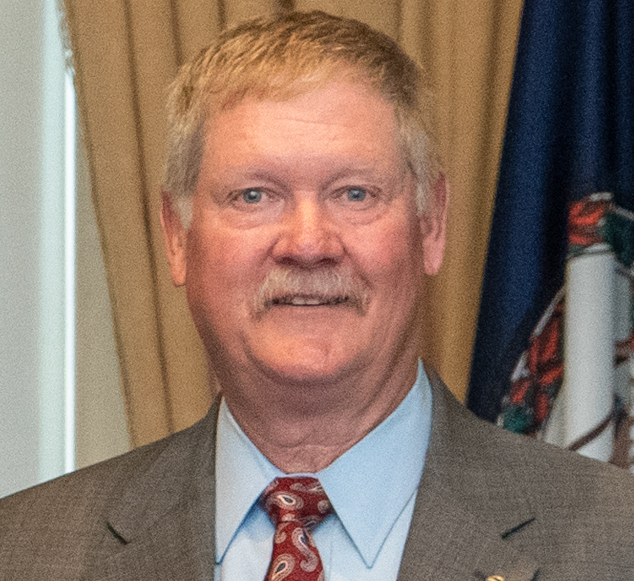
- Wilt in 2023

Member of the Virginia House of Delegates
- Incumbent
- Assumed office June 24, 2010
- Preceded by: Matt Lohr
- Constituency: 26th district (2010–2024); 34th district (2024–present)

Personal details
- Born: September 18, 1961 (age 65) Harrisonburg, Virginia, U.S.
- Party: Republican
- Spouse: Vickie Elizabeth Cook
- Children: Rebecca, Matthew
- Education: Blue Ridge Community College
- Occupation: Concrete contractor
- Committees: Agriculture, Chesapeake and Natural Resources; Counties, Cities and Towns; Militia, Police and Public Safety
- Website: www.delegatewilt.com

Tony O. Wilt (born September 18, 1961) is an American politician. A Republican, he was elected to the Virginia House of Delegates in 2010. He currently represents the 34th district, made up of the city of Harrisonburg and part of Rockingham County in the Shenandoah Valley.

== Early life, education, business career ==
Born in Harrisonburg, Virginia, Wilt graduated from Broadway High School in 1979. He received an A.A. degree from Blue Ridge Community College in 1994, and a bachelor's degree in applied ministry from Cornerstone Bible College in 2005.

After high school, Wilt went to work for his family's business, Superior Concrete, Inc. He is now the president and general manager.

Wilt married Vickie Elizabeth Cook in 1987. They have two children.

== Political career ==
On March 16, 2010, Governor Bob McDonnell appointed the 26th district incumbent, Matt Lohr, Commissioner of the Virginia Department of Agriculture and Consumer Services. Wilt became the Republican nominee to succeed Lohr. He defeated Democrat Kai E. Degner and independent Carolyn W. Frank in a special election on June 15, receiving 65.79% of the vote. Wilt was unopposed for reelection in 2011.

In 2022, Wilt was promoted to chair of the Public Safety Committee.

In 2023, Wilt was reelected to the House of Delegates. Starting in the 2024 session he will represent the 34th district, following earlier redistricting.
