= Joel Baxley =

American businessman and government official

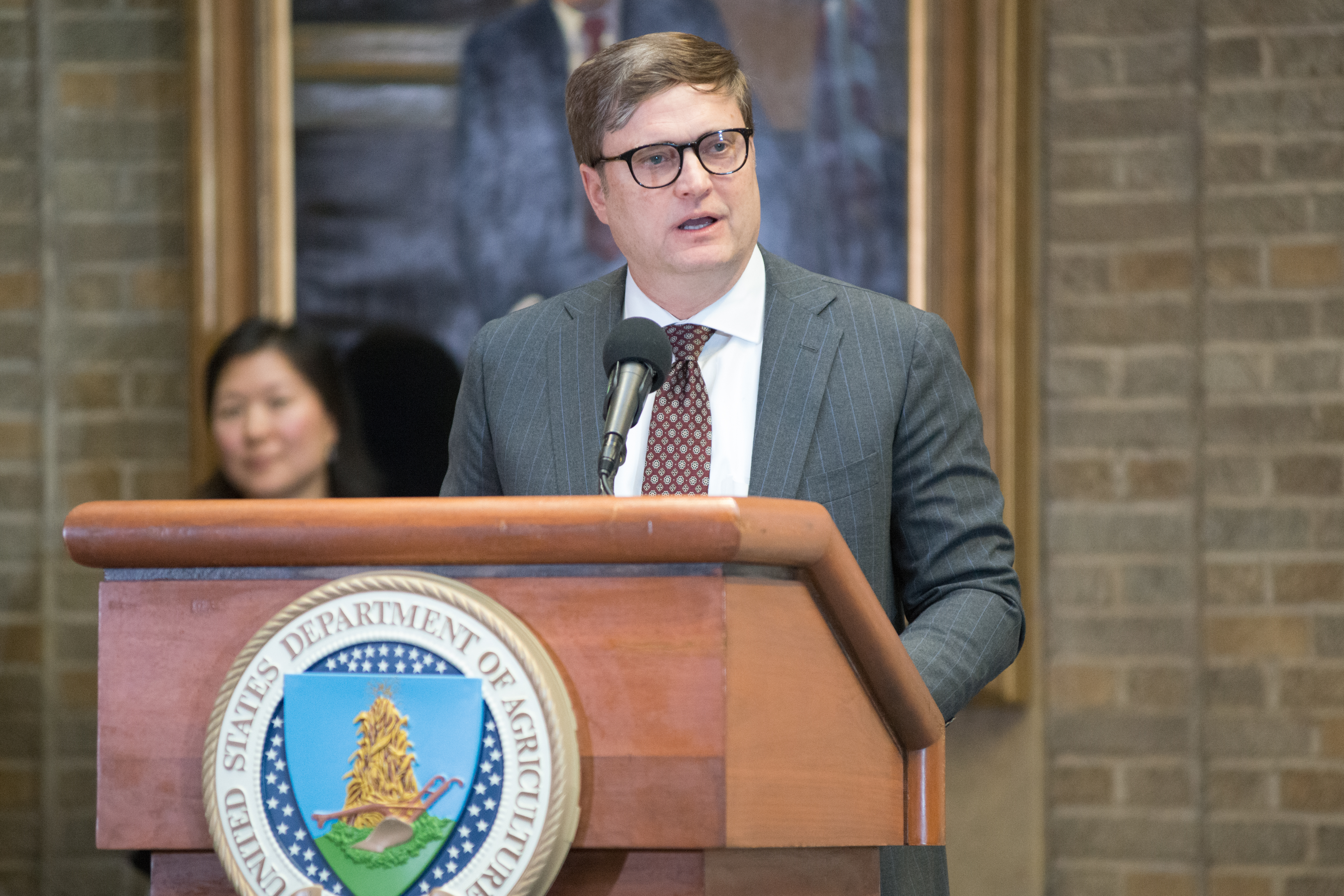

Acting Assistant to the Secretary for Rural Development
- In office February 7, 2019 – August 2, 2019
- President: Donald Trump
- Preceded by: Anne Hazlett
- Succeeded by: Donald 'DJ' Lavoy

Administrator of Rural Housing Services
- In office April 30, 2018 – February 7, 2019

Personal details
- Born: Joel Clinton Baxley
- Party: Republican
- Education: University of Alabama (MBA), University of Oxford (PgD),

Joel C. Baxley is an American businessman and former government official who most recently served as the Acting Assistant to the Secretary for Rural Development.

== Early life and education ==
Baxley was born and raised in Bay County, Florida and received a Master of Business Administration from the University of Alabama. He later went on to earn a postgraduate diploma in financial strategy from the University of Oxford.

== Career ==
Baxley served as the managing partner of Baxley Property Advisors, LLC before holding the titles of Consulting Services Director and the senior real estate technical consultant with RSM US LLP's Financial Advisory Services consulting practice. He eventually rose to become Administrator of USDA Rural Development's Rural Housing Service. In 2019, he was by Sec. Sonny Perdue to replace Assistant to the Secretary for Rural Development Anne Hazlett, who was named the Senior Adviser at the White House Office of National Drug Control Policy. Baxley resigned from his position on August 2, 2019.

== Personal life ==
Baxley is married and has children.
