= CW 43 =

CW 43 may refer to the following television stations in the U.S. owned-and-operated by The CW:

== Current ==
- KAUT-TV in Oklahoma City, Oklahoma
- WVBT-DT2 in Virginia Beach–Norfolk, Virginia

== Former ==
- WUAB in Lorain–Cleveland, Ohio (2018–2025)
