= Bloxom =

Bloxom may refer to:

- Bloxom (surname)
- Bloxom, Virginia
