= USDA Rural Development =

USDA programs

Rural Development
- Official Logo of the United States Department of Agriculture

Agency overview
- Formed: June 2, 1994; 32 years ago
- Preceding agency: Farmers Home Administration and Rural Electrification Administration
- Jurisdiction: Government of the United States
- Headquarters: Washington, D.C., United States
- Motto: "Together, America Prospers"
- Employees: 4,500
- Agency executives: Todd Lindsey, Acting Under Secretary of Agriculture for Rural Development; Neal Robbins, Deputy Under Secretary for Rural Development; John Greene, Chief Operating Officer
- Parent department: United States Department of Agriculture (USDA)
- Child agency: Rural Housing Service (RHS), Rural Utilities Service (RUS), Rural Business-Cooperative Service (RBCS)
- Website: www.rd.usda.gov

USDA Rural Development (RD) is a mission area within the United States Department of Agriculture which runs programs intended to improve the economy and quality of life in rural parts of the United States.

Rural Development has a loan portfolio over $224.5 billion, and administers nearly $16 billion in program loans, loan guarantees, and grants through their programs. Rural Development promotes economic development by supporting loans to businesses through banks, credit unions and community-managed lending pools. It offers technical assistance and information to help agricultural producers and cooperatives get started and improve the effectiveness of their operations. Rural Development also provides technical assistance to help communities undertake community empowerment programs and helps rural residents buy or rent safe, affordable housing and make health and safety repairs to their homes.

== History ==
The origins of the United States Department of Agriculture (USDA) Rural Development mission area trace back to the economic challenges of the Great Depression. At the time, approximately 44% of the U.S. population lived in rural areas, and 25% were engaged in farming. The widespread economic hardship underscored the need for federal policies to support rural communities and agricultural livelihoods.

=== Early Federal Initiatives ===
In 1935, President Franklin D. Roosevelt established the Rural Electrification Administration (REA) via executive order to address the lack of electricity in rural areas. At the time, up to 90% of farms lacked access to electricity due to the high cost of infrastructure and limited interest from private utilities. The REA provided low-interest loans to nonprofit rural electric cooperatives, enabling them to build power lines and deliver electricity to underserved regions. Congress codified this effort through the Rural Electrification Act of 1936. By 1938, 350 cooperative projects were operating in 45 states, serving 1.5 million farms. Technical assistance and community outreach were also key components of the REA’s strategy. By 1942, nearly half of U.S. farms had electricity, and by 1952, nearly all were connected. Telephone cooperatives were added in 1949, and by the mid-1970s, over 90% of farms had both electricity and telephone service.

=== Housing and Infrastructure Development ===
Concurrent with electrification efforts, the federal government addressed housing and infrastructure needs through the Resettlement Administration, created in 1935 to assist farmers and migrant workers affected by drought and land degradation, particularly in the Dust Bowl region. The agency was later transferred to USDA and renamed the Farm Security Administration (FSA), which promoted modern farming practices and land ownership for tenant farmers. The Bankhead-Jones Farm Tenant Act of 1937 authorized credit programs to help tenant farmers purchase land.

During World War II, demand for urban labor and political opposition from large landowners led to the replacement of the FSA with the Farmers Home Administration (FmHA). FmHA expanded its scope to include loans and grants for farmland, housing, water systems, and rural development. The Consolidated Farm and Rural Development Act (ConAct) later broadened eligibility to include nonfarm rural residents and enterprises. By the 1980s, FmHA operated through approximately 1,900 offices and employed over 9,000 staff.

=== Expansion of Rural Policy ===
In the 1960s and 1970s, federal rural policy expanded under President Lyndon B. Johnson’s War on Poverty. The administration recognized the regional nature of rural poverty and established the Appalachian Regional Commission to promote economic development across multiple states. The Rural Community Development Service was also created to centralize rural economic initiatives. Jurisdictional conflicts with other agencies, such as the Office of Economic Opportunity, presented challenges to coordination.

Under President Richard Nixon, the federal approach shifted toward private-sector solutions. The Consolidated Farm and Rural Development Act of 1972 authorized several USDA programs, including the Community Facilities Loan program and Rural Business Enterprise Grants. In 1980, President Jimmy Carter designated USDA as the lead agency for federal rural policy, establishing the position of Undersecretary for Small Community and Rural Development. The Reagan Administration later reduced federal involvement, cutting USDA rural development funding by over 50% and encouraging state and local leadership.

=== Establishment of USDA Rural Development ===
The Rural Development Administration (RDA) was established by the 1990 farm bill (P.L. 101-624, Sec. 2302), amending the Consolidated Farm and Rural Development Act of 1972 (7 U.S.C. 1921 et seq.), to administer FmHA community and business programs and other USDA rural development programs. After a brief period named "Rural Economic and Community Development" (P.L. 103-354 Subtitle C), RDA was superseded by the Office of Rural Development following the 1994 reorganization of USDA authorized by P.L. 103-354.

In 1993, the Clinton Administration initiated a government-wide efficiency review, resulting in the National Performance Review. The report recommended streamlining USDA operations and focusing on six core functions: commodity programs, rural development, nutrition, conservation, food quality, and research. The Federal Crop Insurance Reform and Department of Agriculture Reorganization Act of 1994 implemented these recommendations and formally established the USDA Rural Development mission area. On October 13, 1994, the Department of Agriculture was reorganized under the Federal Crop Insurance Reform Act of 1994 and Department of Agriculture Reorganization Act of 1994. Under that act, USDA Rural Development was created to administer the former Farmers Home Administration's (FmHA) non-farm financial programs for rural housing, community facilities, water and waste disposal, and rural businesses. The former Rural Electrification Administration's (REA) utility programs were also consolidated within Rural Development. This reorganization separated farm policy from rural policy and consolidated non-farm programs into three agencies:

Rural Housing Service (RHS): Responsible for housing and community development programs

Rural Business-Cooperative Service (RBCS): Oversees business development and cooperative programs

Rural Utilities Service (RUS): Manages electric, telecommunications, and water infrastructure programs

This structure enabled USDA to more effectively coordinate rural-specific programs and address the broader needs of rural communities.

=== 21st Century Developments ===
As of the 2020s, USDA Rural Development administers over 70 programs and manages a loan portfolio exceeding $200 billion. It provides more than $40 billion annually in loans, loan guarantees, and grants to support infrastructure, housing, business development, and utilities in rural areas.

In 2023, the Inflation Reduction Act (IRA) introduced the largest federal investment in rural electrification since 1936. Administered through RUS and RBCS, the IRA created new funding mechanisms to expand clean energy, modernize rural power systems, and stimulate job creation. Sections 22001 through 22005 of the legislation authorized new loan and grant products to support these goals.

USDA Rural Development operates through 47 state and territorial offices and numerous field offices. New divisions such as the Innovation Center and Business Center have been established to improve service delivery and operational efficiency. The agency’s field-based structure allows for direct program administration and coordination of rural policy across the federal government.

== Operating units ==
- Rural Business-Cooperative Service (RBCS)
- Rural Housing Service (RHS)
- Rural Utilities Service (RUS)
