= Robert Bloxom =

American politician (1937–2020)

1st Virginia Secretary of Agriculture and Forestry
- In office January 3, 2005 – January 16, 2010
- Governor: Mark Warner; Tim Kaine
- Preceded by: None (position created)
- Succeeded by: Todd Haymore

Member of the Virginia House of Delegates
- In office January 11, 1978 – January 14, 2004
- Preceded by: George N. McMath
- Succeeded by: Lynwood Lewis
- Constituency: 46th district (1978–1982); 42nd district (1982–1983); 100th district (1983–2004)

Personal details
- Born: Robert Spurgeon Bloxom; April 6, 1937 Baltimore, Maryland, U.S.
- Died: December 13, 2020 (aged 83) Mappsville, Virginia, U.S.
- Party: Republican
- Spouse: Patricia Killmon
- Education: University of Richmond

Robert Spurgeon Bloxom Sr. (April 26, 1937 – December 13, 2020) was an American politician from the Commonwealth of Virginia. He served in the Virginia House of Delegates before becoming Secretary of Agriculture and Forestry.

Bloxom was nominated to become the first agriculture secretary for Virginia by Governor of Virginia Mark Warner. When Tim Kaine succeeded Warner as governor, he retained Bloxom in the role.

His son Robert Bloxom Jr. was elected to the House of Delegates in 2014.

Bloxom died at his home in Mappsville, Virginia, on December 13, 2020, at the age of 83.

Virginia House of Delegates
Preceded by George N. McMath	Member of the Virginia House of Delegates from the 46th district 1978–1982	Succeeded by Bernard S. Cohen
Preceded by Billy O'Brien	Member of the Virginia House of Delegates from the 42nd district 1982–1983	Succeeded by Warren E. Barry
Preceded by None	Member of the Virginia House of Delegates from the 100th district 1983–2004	Succeeded by Lynwood Lewis
Political offices
Preceded by None	Virginia Secretary of Agriculture and Forestry; 2005–2010	Succeeded by Todd Haymore
