= Virginia's 100th House of Delegates district =

Virginia legislative district

Virginia's 100th State House of Delegates district
- District map from the 2023 election
Delegate
Robert Bloxom Jr. R
- Demographics: 65.0% White; 19.6% Black; 9.2% Hispanic; 3.2% Asian; 5.3% Other
- Population (2020): 84,622
- Registered voters (2024): 62,769

Virginia's 100th House of Delegates district elects one of the 100 members of the Virginia House of Delegates, the lower house of the state's bicameral legislature. District 100 is located on the Eastern Shore of Virginia and includes parts of Norfolk City, Accomack County and Northampton County, Virginia. Since 2014, the district has been represented by Republican Robert Bloxom Jr.

== List of delegates ==
Delegate	Party	Years	Electoral history
Robert Bloxom	Republican	January 12, 1983 – January 14, 2004	Elected in 1983. Re-elected in 1985. Re-elected in 1987. Re-elected in 1989. Re-elected in 1991. Re-elected in 1993. Re-elected in 1995. Re-elected in 1997. Re-elected in 1999. Re-elected in 2001. Retired.
Lynwood Lewis	Democratic	January 14, 2004 – January 28, 2014	Elected in 2003. Re-elected in 2005. Re-elected in 2007. Re-elected in 2009. Re-elected in 2011. Resigned when elected to the Senate.
Robert Bloxom Jr.	Republican	February 26, 2014 – present	Elected to finish Lewis's term. Re-elected in 2015. Re-elected in 2017. Re-elected in 2019. Re-elected in 2021. Re-elected in 2023. (Note: Following redistricting, District 100 had two incumbents for previous districts within it: Bloxom from District 100 and Tim Anderson from what was previously District 83. However, Anderson deigned not to run again, aiming for a Virginia Senate seat (which he would lose); Bloxom, unopposed in the primary, won against the Democratic nominee Charlena Jones.); Re-elected in 2025.
