= Virginia Secretary of Agriculture and Forestry =

Office in Virginia, United States

- Seal of the Commonwealth of Virginia

- Flag of Virginia
- Incumbent; Katie Frazier since January 17, 2026
- Style: Mr. Secretary
- Member of: Virginia Governor's Cabinet
- Nominator: The governor
- Appointer: The governor with advice and consent from the Senate and House
- Term length: 4 years
- Inaugural holder: Robert Bloxom
- Formation: 2004
- Website: ag-forestry.virginia.gov

The secretary of agriculture and forestry is a member of the Virginia Governor's Cabinet and oversees agriculture and forestry in the Commonwealth of Virginia. The current incumbent is Katie Frazier, who was appointed by Governor Abigail Spanberger.

== Background ==
The Virginia Secretariat of Agriculture and Forestry was created in 2004. It oversees the Virginia Department of Agriculture and Consumer Services and the Virginia Department of Forestry. Governor Mark Warner appointed former Delegate Robert Bloxom as the first secretary.

== List of secretaries of agriculture ==
No.	Name	Took office	Left office	Governor(s)
1	Robert Bloxom	January 3, 2005	January 16, 2010	Mark Warner
1	Robert Bloxom	January 3, 2005	January 16, 2010	Tim Kaine
2	Todd Haymore	January 16, 2010	September 12, 2016	Bob McDonnell
2	Todd Haymore	January 16, 2010	September 12, 2016	Terry McAuliffe
3	Basil Gooden	September 12, 2016	January 13, 2018	Terry McAuliffe
4	Bettina Ring	January 13, 2018	January 15, 2022	Ralph Northam
5	Matt Lohr	January 15, 2022	January 17, 2026	Glenn Youngkin
6	Katie Frazier	January 17, 2026		Abigail Spanberger
