= Wharton Place =

Historic house in Virginia, United States

- U.S. National Register of Historic Places
- Virginia Landmarks Register
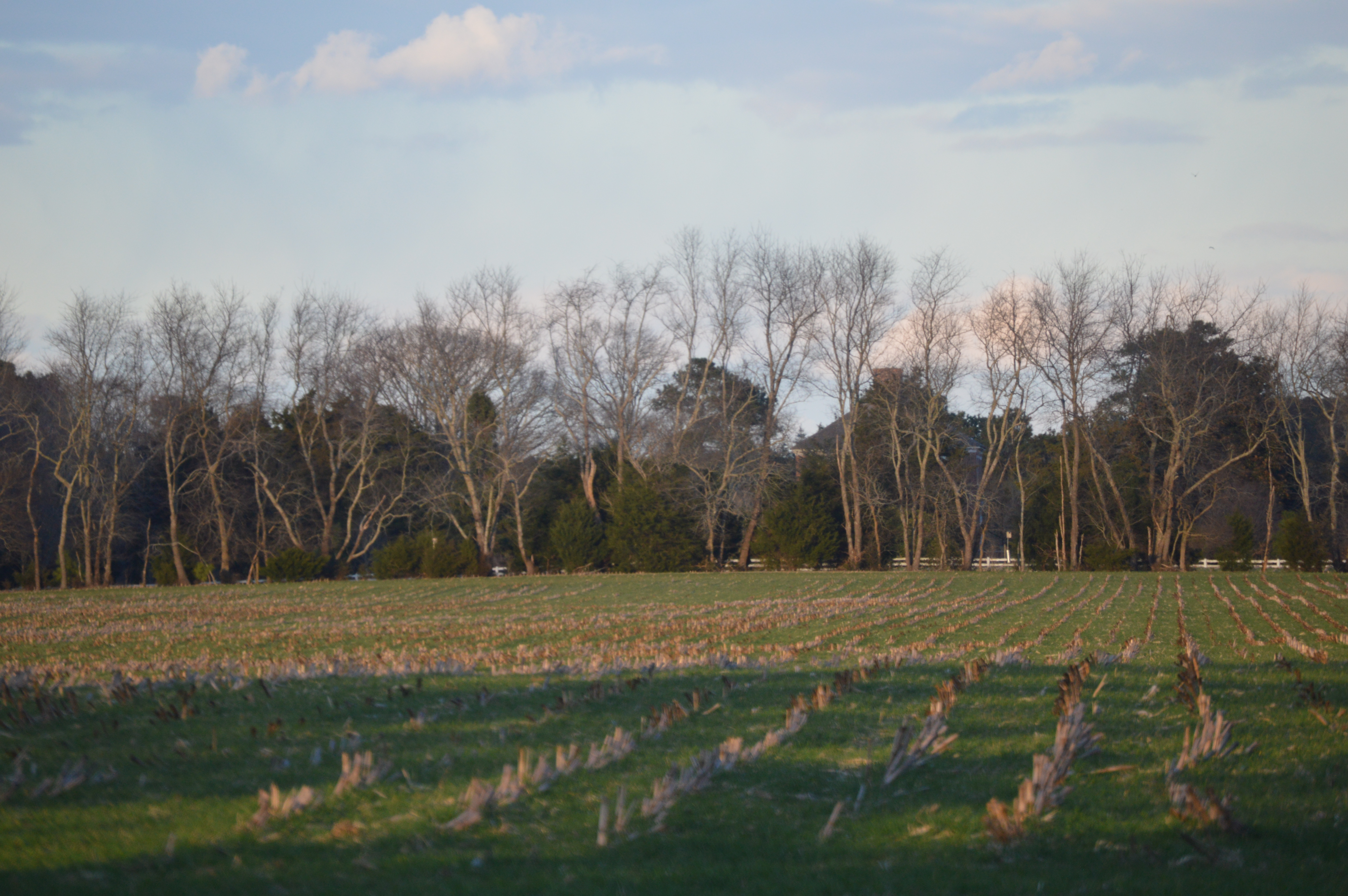
- Fields at the property; the house is slightly visible at right

- Location within Virginia Location within the United States
- Location: 0.7 mi. NE of jct. of VA 762 and 679, Mappsville, Virginia
- Coordinates: 37°50′51″N 75°31′58″W
- Area: 160 acres (65 ha)
- Built: 1798
- Built by: Wellford, Robert
- Architectural style: Federal
- NRHP reference No.: 72001378
- VLR No.: 001-0050

Significant dates
- Added to NRHP: November 3, 1972
- Designated VLR: April 18, 1972

Wharton Place is a historic home located at Mappsville, Accomack County, Virginia. It was built in 1798, and is a two-story, five-bay, brick dwelling in the Federal style. It has a one-story brick kitchen wing. It has a deck-on-hip roof and projecting interior chimneys. Also on the property is a contributing frame smokehouse. The house was built by John Wharton (1762-1811), a prosperous maritime merchant and native of Accomack County.

It was added to the National Register of Historic Places in 1974.
