= Glen R. Smith =

American farmer and businessman

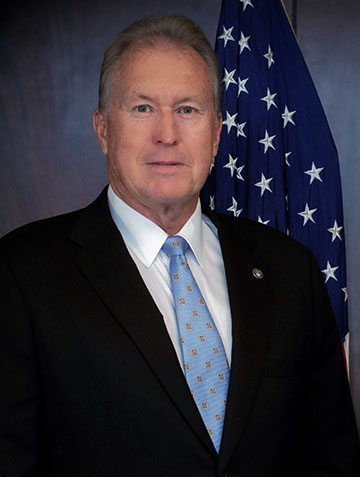

Under Secretary of Agriculture for Rural Development
- Incumbent
- Assumed office August 21, 2026
- President: Donald Trump
- Preceded by: Basil Gooden

11th Chairman of the Farm Credit Administration
- In office July 17, 2019 – October 21, 2022
- President: Donald Trump; Joe Biden
- Preceded by: Dallas Tonsager
- Succeeded by: Vincent G. Logan

Board Member for the Farm Credit Administration
- In office December 14, 2017 – August 24, 2026
- President: Donald Trump; Joe Biden; Donald Trump
- Preceded by: Kenneth Albert Spearman

Personal details
- Born: Atlantic, Iowa
- Spouse: Fauzan
- Children: 4
- Education: Iowa State University

Glen R. Smith is an American farmer and businessman who has served as the Under Secretary of Agriculture for Rural Development since August 2026. He also served as a board member and chairman of the Farm Credit Administration. In 1982, Smith co-founded Smith Land Service, a company that specializes in farm management, land appraisal, and farmland brokerage services. He also owns and serves as president of Smith Generation Farms, Inc., a family farm operation in western Iowa that includes 2,000 acres of corn and soybeans. Smith was nominated for Under Secretary of Agriculture for Rural Development by Donald Trump and left the FCA on August 24, 2026, to fill that position.

Born in Atlantic, Iowa, Smith was raised on a crop and livestock farm, and received a B.S. in agricultural business from Iowa State University in 1979.
