= WVBT =

Television station in Virginia Beach, Virginia

- Virginia Beach–Norfolk–Hampton, Virginia; United States
- City: Virginia Beach, Virginia
- Channels: Digital: 21 (UHF); Virtual: 43
- Branding: Fox43; The CW Hampton Roads (43.2)

Programming
- Affiliations: 43.1: Fox; 43.2: The CW; for others, see § Subchannels

Ownership
- Owner: Nexstar Media Group; (Nexstar Media Inc.)
- Sister stations: WAVY-TV; Tegna: WVEC

History
- First air date: December 17, 1992
- Former channel numbers: Analog: 43 (UHF, 1992–2009); Digital: 29 (UHF, 2002–2020)
- Former affiliations: Independent (1992–1995); The WB (1995–1998)
- Call sign meaning: Virginia Beach Television

Technical information
- Licensing authority: FCC
- Facility ID: 65387
- ERP: 850 kW
- HAAT: 300 m (980 ft)
- Transmitter coordinates: 36°49′15″N 76°30′40″W
- Translator(s): WPMC-CD 36 Mappsville

Links
- Public license information: Public file; LMS
- Website: www.wavy.com/fox43-tv

WVBT (channel 43) is a television station licensed to Virginia Beach, Virginia, United States, affiliated with Fox and The CW. It is owned by Nexstar Media Group alongside NBC affiliate WAVY-TV (channel 10); Nexstar's Tegna subsidiary owns ABC affiliate WVEC (channel 13). WVBT and WAVY-TV share studios on Wavy Street in downtown Portsmouth. WVBT's transmitter is located near Driver in Suffolk.

Though the construction permit was awarded in 1985, WVBT began broadcasting in December 1992, initially with home shopping programming. In January 1995, it affiliated with The WB, converted to a general-entertainment schedule, and came under the operational control of WAVY-TV under a local marketing agreement. Later that year, it secured affiliation with Fox, effective August 31, 1998. On that date, the station began airing a 10 p.m. local newscast produced by WAVY-TV. Nexstar acquired WAVY and WVBT in 2017 as part of its purchase of Media General.

== History ==
=== Construction and early years ===
The Federal Communications Commission allocated channel 43 to Virginia Beach in February 1982 on a petition by Ocean Broadcasting Corporation, headed by a Virginia Beach attorney. Other applicants also filed for the channel, including a lawyer from Knoxville, Tennessee; Summit Communications, led by developer Dewey Simmons; and Tidewater Christian Communications Corporation, a group of Black pastors. In all, six groups had filed, three of which merged in December 1983. Summit was awarded the construction permit in 1985. The station was not built immediately because of the illness of Summit's president, Simmons, and other delays. It reorganized in 1986 and changed its name to Virginia Beach Television Inc. WVBT began broadcasting as a full-time Home Shopping Network affiliate on December 17, 1992. By this time, it was owned by Walter Ulloa of Los Angeles.

This programming changed in January 1995 with three near-simultaneous events. The station affiliated with The WB when it launched on January 11, 1995; changed from home shopping to a general-entertainment schedule; and signed a local marketing agreement (LMA) with LIN TV, owner of Portsmouth-based NBC affiliate WAVY-TV (channel 10). WVBT also began offering overflow programming—for instance, NBC daytime shows during coverage of the murder trial of O. J. Simpson and conflicting sports telecasts. The new programming and alliance with WAVY earned WVBT interest from cable operators, who had previously shunned adding the home shopping station to their lineups but were more interested in the station as a WB affiliate. On May 18, 1996, the station began broadcasting from a new transmitter facility, with its antenna 500 feet (150 m) higher and its power increased to the maximum of 5 million watts.

=== Affiliation with Fox and newscast launch ===
On November 29, 1995, Fox announced that it would move its programming to WVBT from WTVZ-TV (channel 33) in Norfolk, a station owned by Sinclair Broadcast Group. The surprise switch was announced with no reason given; however, three weeks later, the situation came into focus when Fox executed a similar affiliation switch with Sinclair's WLFL in Raleigh, North Carolina. Like in Hampton Roads, Fox announced it would move to a WB affiliate programmed by a major network station in 1998 at the expiration of its existing Sinclair contract; Sinclair cited "different philosophical views about the future" for the change. The company apparently had little confidence in Fox plans to expand to late night and early morning slots as well as in the area of news. The additional network shows threatened to encroach on lucrative fringe periods where the Sinclair stations made money. Notably, WTVZ did not have a 10 p.m. local newscast and under Sinclair had held off on doing so. Even though relations improved between Sinclair and Fox, the network had already signed affiliation agreements with its new Raleigh and Norfolk stations and carried out the switch, with WVBT joining Fox on August 31, 1998.

As part of the affiliation with Fox, WAVY committed to develop a 10 p.m. newscast for WVBT. By 1998, no such newscast was available on a broadcast station; WTKR produced one for WGNT, which was canceled in December 1997, and a newscast co-produced by WVEC and The Virginian-Pilot, Pilot 13 News at 10, aired on the cable channel Local News on Cable. On August 31, 1998, concurrent with the switch, WVBT debuted Fox43 News at 10. The program—promoted as "the newest newscast on the planet"—featured its own anchors (Kelly Wright and Krista Marino on weeknights), news set, and purple graphics, as well as a faster-paced production style oriented to younger viewers, with WAVY's weather and sports presenters. Within a year, ratings for Fox43 News at 10 tripled.

WVBT and Cox Communications, the primary cable television provider in Hampton Roads, entered into a dispute that culminated with WVBT pulling its programming from Cox on December 31, 1999. The reason for the dispute was that Cox continued to give WVBT a high channel number—channel 43—on its cable system. WVBT asked to be moved to channel 5, 6, 11 or 14, which the cable company refused to do. Many viewers—and even station staffers and the station facilities—needed antennas to see WVBT's signal. After 35 days, WVBT returned to the Cox system and won a move to channel 14 on cable. In 2002, LIN TV purchased WVBT from Beach 43 Corporation, creating an outright duopoly.

WVBT expanded its news offerings in February 2009 with the debut of a morning news extension, Fox43 News at 7am. This was reformatted into an 8 a.m. lifestyle show, The Hampton Roads Show, in January 2010. The Hampton Roads Show moved to WAVY-TV in 2011. The 7 a.m. newscast was later revived and extended to two hours by January 2014.

=== Media General and Nexstar ownership ===
In 2014, LIN TV was acquired by Media General. After purchasing LIN, Media General initially agreed to merge with the Meredith Corporation but faced a shareholder revolt in the wake of an unsolicited offer from Nexstar Broadcasting Group, which agreed to acquire the company in 2016 and completed the acquisition in 2017. Though Nexstar agreed to acquire Tribune Media—owner of WTKR and WGNT—in 2018, it elected to retain WAVY and WVBT and spin off the other stations.

Under Media General and Nexstar, WVBT added a half-hour 7 p.m. newscast in 2016 and a 6:30 p.m. newscast in February 2019. The addition of the latter increased WAVY–WVBT's local news output to 61 hours a week.

On May 1, 2024, it was announced that WVBT's second subchannel would join The CW in September; Cozi TV moved to subchannel 43.4.

== Technical information ==
=== Subchannels ===
WVBT's transmitter is located near Driver in Suffolk. The station's signal is multiplexed:

Subchannels of WVBT
Subchannel	Res.	Short name	Programming
43.1	720p	WVBT	Fox
43.2	720p	CW	The CW
43.3	480i	Antenna	Antenna TV
43.4	480i	COZI	Cozi TV

=== Analog-to-digital conversion ===
WVBT began broadcasting a digital signal on channel 29 on March 21, 2002, and ended regular programming on its analog signal, over UHF channel 43, on June 12, 2009, as part of the digital television transition. The station's digital signal remained on channel 29, where it remained until moving to channel 21 on January 17, 2020, as a result of the 2016 United States wireless spectrum auction.

=== ATSC 3.0 lighthouse ===
An associated facility to WVBT, Norfolk-licensed WNLO-CD (channel 14), serves as the ATSC 3.0 (NextGen TV) lighthouse station for Hampton Roads, serving the Nexstar stations and WTVZ-TV. It began this service in November 2020.

Subchannels of WNLO-CD (ATSC 3.0)
Subchannel	Res.	Short name	Programming
10.1	1080p	WAVY	NBC (WAVY-TV)
33.1	720p	WTVZ	MyNetworkTV (WTVZ-TV)
33.10	1080p	T2	T2
33.11		PBTV	Pickleballtv
43.1	720p	WVBT	Fox (WVBT)
45.1	720p	WNLO-CD	Fox (WVBT)

Subchannel streamed via the Internet

=== Translator ===
To serve the northern part of Accomack County, Virginia, that is too distant to receive signals from Norfolk, WVBT's main subchannel is rebroadcast on class A translator WPMC-CD, licensed to Mappsville with a transmitter site near Bloxom:

Subchannel of WPMC-CD
Subchannel	Res.	Short name	Programming
36.1	480i	WPMC-CD	Fox
