= Lynwood Lewis =

American politician from Virginia

Lynwood W. Lewis

Member of the Virginia Senate from the 6th district
- In office January 28, 2014 – January 10, 2024
- Preceded by: Ralph Northam
- Succeeded by: Bill DeSteph (Redistricting)

Member of the Virginia House of Delegates from the 100th district
- In office January 14, 2004 – January 28, 2014
- Preceded by: Robert Bloxom
- Succeeded by: Robert Bloxom Jr.

Personal details
- Born: Lynwood Wayne Lewis Jr. November 26, 1961 (age 64) Nassawadox, Virginia, U.S.
- Party: Democratic
- Spouse: Megan Milliken
- Children: John
- Education: Hampden–Sydney College (BA); University of Richmond (JD)
- Profession: Lawyer
- Committees: Local Government (Chair); Agriculture, Conservation and Natural Resources; Commerce and Labor; Education and Health; Rules

Lynwood Wayne Lewis Jr. (born November 26, 1961) is an American politician and lawyer. A Democrat, he was elected to the Virginia House of Delegates in November 2003, representing the 100th district, which consists of the Eastern Shore counties of Accomack and Northampton, and parts of the cities of Norfolk and Hampton.

On November 16, 2013, Lewis won the Democratic Party nomination for Virginia's 6th Senate district, which had been held by lieutenant governor-elect Ralph Northam (D). On January 10, 2014, the Virginia State Board of Elections certified that Lewis had won the special election for Northam's senate seat by only nine votes out of over 20,000 cast. His Republican opponent sought a recount, which was held on January 27. After most of the recount had been completed, it became clear that Lewis's lead had held and his opponent conceded. Lewis was sworn in on January 28, 2014, giving Democrats control of the chamber.

In March 2023, Lewis announced he would not run for reelection in the 2023 election.

== Electoral history ==
| Date | Election | Candidate | Party | Votes | % |
Senate of Virginia, 3rd district
| November 2, 1999 | General | Tommy Norment | Republican | 24,916 | 62.93 |
| November 2, 1999 | General | Lynwood W. Lewis Jr. | Democratic | 14,611 | 36.90 |
| November 2, 1999 | General | Write Ins | | 68 | 0.17 |
| November 2, 1999 | General | Republican incumbent held seat | | | |
Virginia House of Delegates, 100th district
| November 4, 2003 | General | Lynwood W. Lewis Jr. | Democratic | 7,438 | 59.34 |
| November 4, 2003 | General | T. B. Dix Jr. | Republican | 5,094 | 40.64 |
| November 4, 2003 | General | Write Ins | | 2 | 0.02 |
| November 4, 2003 | General | Robert S. Bloxom retired; seat changed from Republican to Democratic | | | |
| November 8, 2005 | General | Lynwood W. Lewis Jr. | Democratic | 9,903 | 99.01 |
| November 8, 2005 | General | Write Ins | | 99 | 0.99 |
| November 6, 2007 | General | Lynwood W. Lewis Jr. | Democratic | 12,328 | 98.98 |
| November 6, 2007 | General | Write Ins | | 127 | 1.01 |
| November 3, 2009 | General | Lynwood W. Lewis Jr. | Democratic | 8,476 | 64.01 |
| November 3, 2009 | General | Melody Himel Scalley | Republican | 4,604 | 34.77 |
| November 3, 2009 | General | John W. Smith Jr. | | 149 | 1.12 |
| November 3, 2009 | General | Write Ins | | 11 | 0.08 |
| November 8, 2011 | General | Lynwood W. Lewis Jr. | Democratic | 12,512 | 98.04 |
| November 8, 2011 | General | Write Ins | | 249 | 1.95 |
| November 5, 2013 | General | Lynwood W. Lewis Jr. | Democratic | 13,100 | 70.87 |
| November 5, 2013 | General | John W. Smith Jr. | | 5,310 | 28.73 |
| November 5, 2013 | General | Write Ins | | 75 | 0.41 |
Senate of Virginia, 6th district
January 7, 2014
| January 7, 2014 | Special; General | Lynwood W. Lewis Jr. | Democratic | 10,203 | 50.00 |
| January 7, 2014 | Special; General | B. Wayne Coleman | Republican | 10,192 | 49.95 |
| January 7, 2014 | Special; General | Write Ins | | 8 | 0.05 |
| January 7, 2014 | Special; General | Ralph Northam resigned; seat stayed Democratic | | | |
November 3, 2015
| November 3, 2015 | General | Lynwood W. Lewis Jr. | Democratic | 16,738 | 59.45 |
| November 3, 2015 | General | Richard Hooper Ottinger | Republican | 11,386 | 40.44 |
| November 3, 2015 | General | Write Ins | | 29 | 0.10 |
November 5, 2019
| November 5, 2019 | General | Lynwood W. Lewis Jr. | Democratic | 25,755 | 59.65 |
| November 5, 2019 | General | Elizabeth Lankford | Republican | 17,351 | 40.19 |
| November 5, 2019 | General | Write Ins | | 69 | 0.16 |

== Notes ==
Virginia House of Delegates
| Preceded by Robert Bloxom | Member of the Virginia House of Delegates from the 100th district 2004–2014 | Succeeded by Robert Bloxom Jr. |
Senate of Virginia
| Preceded by Ralph Northam | Member of the Virginia Senate from the 6th district 2014–2024 | Succeeded by Todd Pillion |
