= Rural Cooperatives =

Defunct American trade magazine

- Categories: Trade magazine
- Frequency: Bimonthly
- First issue: April 1934
- Final issue Number: January 2018; 85
- Company: Rural Business-Cooperative Service
- Country: United States
- Based in: Washington, D.C.
- Language: English
- Website: www.rd.usda.gov
- ISSN: 1088-8845

Rural Cooperatives was a bimonthly trade journal for rural cooperatives in the United States. It was published by the United States Department of Agriculture's (USDA) Rural Business-Cooperative Service in Washington, D.C., and focused on rural agricultural cooperatives. The magazine was published between April 1934 and January 2018.

== History and profile ==
The publication began as News for Farmer Cooperatives and was published by the U.S. Farm Credit Administration from April 1934 until December 1953. The journal was initially published on a monthly basis. The journal was published from 1954 until January 1976 by the U.S. Farmer Cooperative Service. In 1976, the journal shortened its name to Farmer Cooperatives and, in 1996, the journal changed its name again to Rural Cooperatives and broadened its scope to include rural utility and consumers' cooperatives.

Rural Cooperatives magazine helped to increase understanding and use of the cooperative, producer- and user-owned form of business. USDA's oldest periodical, it was launched after Congress passed the Cooperative Marketing Act, which charges USDA with helping to promote cooperatives through education, research, statistics, technical assistance and co-op development.

The primary audience for this prize-winning publication included the leaders of the nation's farm, farm credit and electric co-ops, ag educators, rural development specialists, rural Congressional representatives, cooperative extension staff and other professionals who work with cooperatives.

Rural Cooperatives ended publication with the 85th volume published in January 2018.
