= Basil Gooden =

American politician

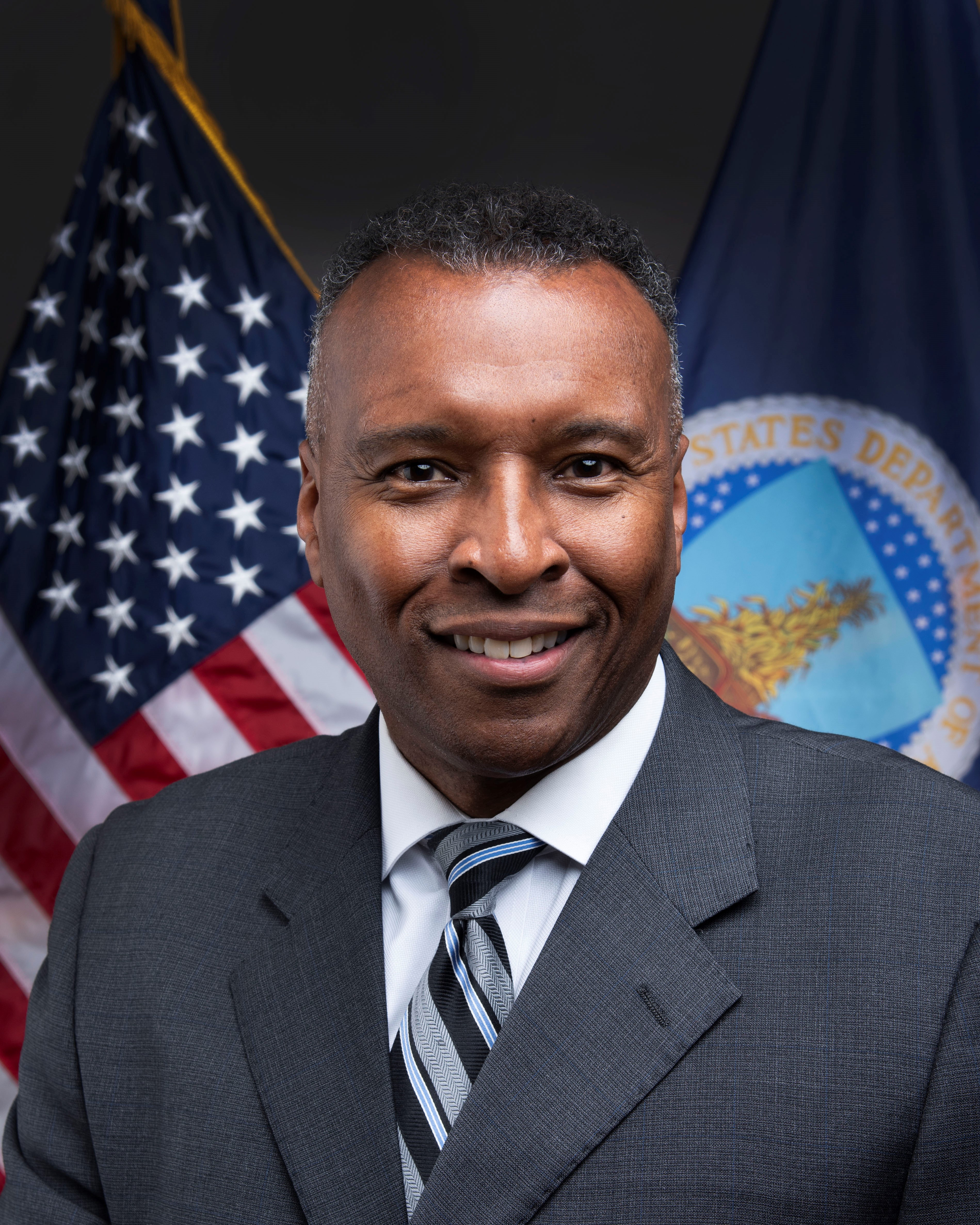
- Official portrait, 2023

Under Secretary of Agriculture for Rural Development
- In office March 4, 2024 – January 20, 2025
- President: Joe Biden
- Preceded by: Xochitl Torres Small
- Succeeded by: Glen R. Smith

3rd Virginia Secretary of Agriculture and Forestry
- In office September 5, 2016 – January 13, 2018
- Governor: Terry McAuliffe
- Preceded by: Todd Haymore
- Succeeded by: Bettina Ring

Virginia State Director, USDA-Rural Development
- In office May 14, 2014 – September 1, 2016
- President: Barack Obama
- Preceded by: Ellen Davis
- Succeeded by: Elizabeth Walker Green

Deputy Director of the Virginia Department of Housing and Community Development
- In office May 22, 2002 – May 14, 2014
- Governor: Mark Warner; Tim Kaine; Bob McDonnell; Terry McAuliffe
- Preceded by: Glenn Oder
- Succeeded by: Erik Johnston

Personal details
- Born: Basil Ivanhoe Gooden Charlottesville, Virginia, U.S.
- Spouse: Susan Michelle Tinsley
- Education: Virginia Tech (BA); Syracuse University (MSW); University of North Carolina at Chapel Hill (MPH, PhD)

Basil Ivanhoe Gooden is an American governmental executive whose career has advanced equitable food systems, agriculture policy, public health, and community economic development in rural America. Gooden served as the 3rd Virginia Secretary of Agriculture and Forestry for the Commonwealth of Virginia in the cabinet of Governor Terry McAuliffe. He became the first Black American to serve in this position and during his tenure from September 2016 until January 2018, he was the only Black American Secretary of Agriculture in any state in the United States. In his capacity as Secretary, he provided strategic vision and leadership to two of Virginia's largest private industries, Agriculture and Forestry, with an annual economic impact of $91 billion on the Commonwealth.

Prior to serving as Secretary, Gooden was appointed by then President Barack Obama to serve as the state director for USDA – Rural Development in Virginia. In that position, he served as the chief executive officer of this federal agency that allocated approximately $1.25 billion annually to improve the economy and quality of life in rural Virginians.

Gooden served for twelve years as the Chief Deputy Director of the Virginia Department of Housing and Community Development (DHCD) in the administrations of four Virginia governors. He was initially appointed to this position by Governor Mark R. Warner and subsequently re-appointed and served in the administrations of Governors Timothy M. Kaine (D), Robert F. McDonnell (R), and Terry McAuliffe (D).

In 2017, Gooden was elected as a fellow of the National Academy of Public Administration.

On September 11, 2023, President Joseph R. Biden nominated Gooden to the role of Under Secretary of Agriculture for Rural Development. If confirmed by the Senate, Gooden would succeed former Under Secretary Xochitl Torres Small, who left the role upon her confirmation as Deputy Secretary of Agriculture. On December 6, 2023, the Senate Agriculture Committee voted unanimously to advance Gooden's nomination for consideration by the full Senate. His nomination was confirmed by voice vote on February 26, 2024. He served in this position until January 20, 2025.

== Early and personal life ==
Gooden was born in Charlottesville, Virginia to Allen Cortez Gooden, Jr. ( originally of Birmingham, Alabama) and Christine Shelton Gooden (of Buckingham County, Virginia). His parents were long-time educators in Buckingham County where his father was a school principal and his mother was a home economics teacher. He is the sixth of seven children born to Allen and Christine Gooden. Gooden grew up in Buckingham County, Virginia where he and his family currently own and operate a cattle farm, raising Black Angus beef. His family farm also participates in tree farming and land conservation efforts. As a youth, he was extremely involved in athletics and many Virginia Cooperative Extension related activities that focused on crop production, livestock, and 4-H activities.

Gooden graduated from Buckingham County High School and attended Virginia Tech where he received a B.A. in political science. He earned a Master of Social Work degree from Syracuse University in 1995. Additionally, he is a graduate of the University of North Carolina at Chapel Hill where he received a Master of Public Health and a Ph.D. in 1998. Gooden became a member of Alpha Phi Alpha fraternity in 1984 at Virginia Tech.

Gooden married the former Susan Michelle Tinsley (originally from Bassett/Martinsville, Virginia) on June 12, 1993, in Pittsylvania County, Virginia. Susan T. Gooden is currently the Dean and Professor of the L. Douglas Wilder School of Government and Public Affairs at Virginia Commonwealth University. Drs. Basil and Susan Gooden have one daughter, Caper, who received a B.A. from the College of William and Mary and an M.A. in international economics from the School of Advanced International Studies at Johns Hopkins University.

== Governmental and economic development work ==
=== Secretary of Agriculture and Forestry ===
As Virginia's 3rd Secretary of Agriculture and Forestry, Gooden's top priorities were: (a) increasing economic opportunities in agriculture and forestry; and (b) advancing strategies for rural economic development. These strategies sought to increase the business capacity of farmers, producers and agribusiness as well as increasing Virginia's agricultural and forestry export opportunities to international markets. Under his leadership, the Secretariat worked to promote the economic viability of industrial hemp in Virginia. Also, the Secretariat partnered with the U.S. Farmers and Ranchers Alliance, Secretariat of Technology and James Madison University to host the first-ever Governor's "Smart Farm" Summit on December 12, 2017.

Gooden worked to expand international trade as a key component of increasing economic opportunities in the agriculture and forestry industries in Virginia. As Secretary, he traveled with Governor Terry McAuliffe on numerous trade/marketing missions visiting 17 countries and 23 cities abroad. A few of these countries include; Cuba, Japan, China, Ireland, Germany, Denmark, Singapore, India, Switzerland, Canada and Mexico. He has met and worked with each member of VDACS' global network of trade representatives from Canada, Mexico and Latin America, Europe, the Middle East and North Africa, India, China, Hong Kong and Southeast Asia.

=== U.S. Department of Agriculture - Rural Development ===
In 2014, Gooden was appointed by then-President Barack Obama to serve as the state director for USDA – Rural Development in Virginia. In that position, Gooden served as the chief executive officer of this federal agency that allocated approximately $1.25 billion annually to improve the economy and quality of life in rural Virginians. During his tenure at Rural Development, he restructured the agency's workforce, including hiring twenty-six (26) new employees, to improve program delivery, community outreach, and customer service. USDA-RD assists in building vibrant, sustainable communities by financing projects essential to improving the quality of life and environment. Through USDA-RD, funding is available for job creation, business development, essential community facilities, basic infrastructure and affordable housing. During his tenure as state director, USDA-RD invested more than $2.5 billion into housing, community and economic development projects throughout rural Virginia.

=== Virginia Department of Housing and Community Development ===
Previously, Gooden served as the Chief Deputy Director of the Virginia Department of Housing and Community Development (DHCD) for twelve years. In that position, his primary administrative responsibilities included strategic management, technology advancement, and community development initiatives in economically distressed communities. Before DHCD, he worked at Virginia Tech where he served as the Coordinator of Outreach and Community Relations. Additionally, he worked with Virginia Cooperative Extension as an Extension Specialist where he designed and implemented a statewide research project to assess community issues impacting localities across Virginia. Some of his additional professional experiences include working as a Legislative Assistant to former Congressman L.F. Payne Jr. (Fifth Congressional District of Virginia) and as a Legislative Aide to former United States Senator Charles S. Robb.

Political offices
Preceded by Todd Haymore	Virginia Secretary of Agriculture and Forestry; 2016–2018	Succeeded by Bettina Ring
