= Todd Haymore =

American civil servant

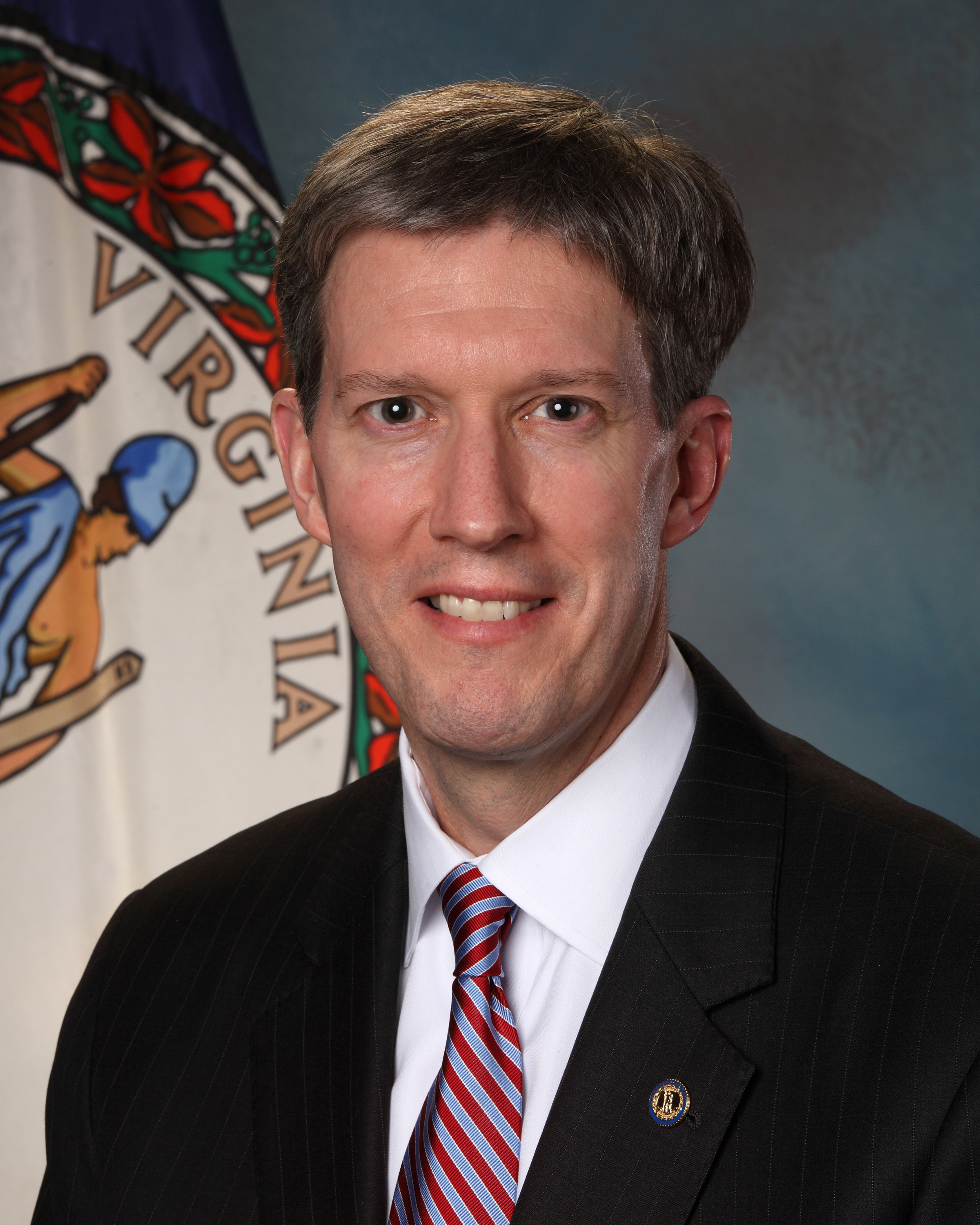

17th Virginia Secretary of Commerce
- In office September 5, 2016 – January 13, 2018
- Governor: Terry McAuliffe
- Preceded by: Maurice Jones
- Succeeded by: Esther Lee

2nd Virginia Secretary of Agriculture and Forestry
- In office January 16, 2010 – September 5, 2016
- Governor: Bob McDonnell; Terry McAuliffe
- Preceded by: Robert Bloxom
- Succeeded by: Basil Gooden

Personal details
- Born: Todd Patterson Haymore Danville, Virginia, U.S.
- Spouse: Margaret Cary Lewis
- Education: University of Richmond (B.A.); Virginia Commonwealth University (M.B.A.)

Todd Patterson Haymore is an American civil servant who served as Virginia Secretary of Commerce and Trade in the administration of Governor Terry McAuliffe. He previously served as the Virginia Secretary of Agriculture and Forestry under Governor Bob McDonnell and Terry McAuliffe. Prior to these two posts, he served in then-Governor Tim Kaine's administration in the Virginia Department of Agriculture and Consumer Services.

In March 2018, he was appointed as Managing Director of the Global Economic Development, Commerce and Government Relations Group, based in the Richmond, Virginia office of Hunton Andrews Kurth.

== Education ==
Haymore received his Bachelor of Arts Degree in Political Science from the University of Richmond, and his Masters of Business Administration from Virginia Commonwealth University. Haymore also completed training at the Performance Management Group's Virginia Executive Institute at Virginia Commonwealth University. In December 2016, during fall commencement ceremonies, VCU awarded Haymore an Honorary Doctorate of Humane Letters for his contributions to Virginia in economic development and global trade promotion.

== Career ==
=== Government ===
Haymore began his professional career as a legislative intern to former Virginia State Senator Onico Barker, and later served as a legislative assistant and communications director to Lewis F. Payne Jr. Haymore served as Commissioner of the Virginia Department of Agriculture & Consumer Services under Governor Tim Kaine. In 2010, Haymore became Virginia's second Agriculture and Forestry Secretary, and was later re-appointed to the position by Governor McAuliffe in 2014. Haymore was appointed Secretary of Commerce and Trade by Governor Terry McAuliffe in September 2016.

=== Business ===
Haymore was an executive at both Universal Leaf Tobacco Corporation and Alliance One International, two of the world's largest leaf tobacco dealers.

== Personal life ==
A native of Danville, Virginia, Haymore is married to Margaret Cary Lewis. They have three children. The Haymore family resides in Henrico County.

Political offices
Preceded by Robert Bloxom	Virginia Secretary of Agriculture and Forestry; 2014–2016	Succeeded by Basil Gooden
Preceded by Maurice Jones	Virginia Secretary of Commerce; 2016–2018	Succeeded by Esther Lee
Academic offices
Preceded by Ben Dendy	Rector of the Board of Visitors of Virginia Commonwealth University; 2023–present	Succeeded by Incumbent
