= Focus Broadband =

American telecommunications company in North Carolina

Focus Broadband (stylized as FOCUS Broadband), formerly Atlantic Telephone Membership Corporation (ATMC), is a member-owned, non-profit cooperative that provides telecommunications services in southeastern North Carolina. It is the largest member-owned cooperative in North Carolina and one of the largest in the United States.

== History ==
ATMC was founded in 1955 by citizens of Brunswick County who were without telephone service and was the tenth such cooperative organized in North Carolina. Using a $381,000 loan from the Rural Electrification Administration, many rural sections of the county received modern phone service for the first time. It added cable television service in the 1980s, becoming the first co-op in the state to provide TV to its members, and Internet in the 1990s. After receiving an American Recovery and Reinvestment Act grant, it expanded into parts of Columbus County in 2011; in 2019, the company obtained a new $25 million grant to lay fiber-optic cables to connect rural areas of that County.

In December 2021, ATMC announced it would change its name to Focus Broadband, reflecting a new emphasis on broadband as its primary service offering.
