= Robert Bloxom Jr. =

American businessman and politician from Virginia

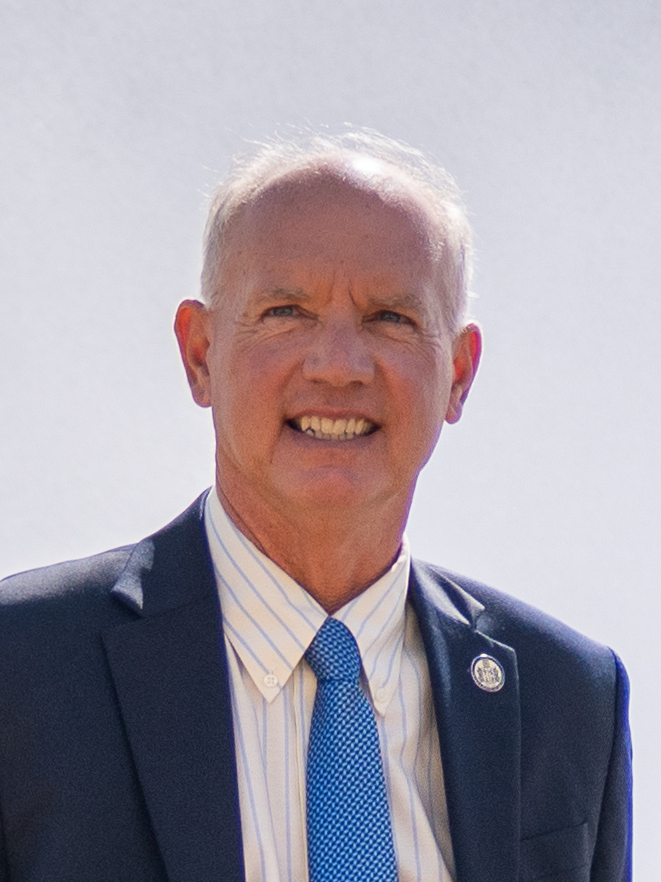
- Bloxom in 2025

Member of the Virginia House of Delegates from the 100th district
- Incumbent
- Assumed office February 26, 2014
- Preceded by: Lynwood Lewis

Personal details
- Born: Robert Spurgeon Bloxom Jr. February 12, 1963 (age 63) Salisbury, Maryland, U.S.
- Party: Republican
- Parent: Robert Bloxom (father)
- Education: University of Richmond (BA)
- Profession: Sales/Aquaculturalist

Robert Spurgeon Bloxom Jr. (born February 12, 1963) is an American businessman and politician from the Commonwealth of Virginia. He is a member of the Virginia House of Delegates from the 100th district, succeeding Lynwood Lewis. Bloxom is a member of the Republican Party.

Bloxom's father, Robert Bloxom Sr., served in the House of Delegates before becoming Virginia Secretary of Agriculture and Forestry.

Bloxom currently serves as a member of the Privileges and Elections Committee, the Appropriations Committee, and the Agriculture, Chesapeake, and Natural Resources Committee.

In 2024, Bloxom was one of five Republican delegates who voted with their Democratic colleagues in support of safeguarding same-sex marriage in Virginia.

Virginia House of Delegates
Preceded by Lynwood Lewis	Member of the Virginia House of Delegates from the 100th district 2014–Present	Incumbent
