= Rural Business-Cooperative Service =

USDA Rural Development agency

Rural Business-Cooperative Service (RBCS)
Agency overview
- Formed: 1994
- Headquarters: USDA Headquarters, 1400 Independence Ave SW, Washington, D.C. 20228
- Annual budget: $1.773 billion
- Agency executives: J. R. Claeys, Administrator; Victoria Collin, Deputy Administrator
- Parent agency: USDA Rural Development
- Website: https://www.rd.usda.gov/about-rd/agencies/rural-business-cooperative-service

The Rural Business-Cooperative Service (abbreviated as "RBS") is one of three agencies within USDA Rural Development (along with the Rural Housing Service and Rural Utilities Service) responsible for administering various economic development programs to rural communities in the United States and its territories. Because these three agencies are closely aligned, they are commonly referred to as the USDA Rural Development, Business & Cooperative Programs.

The mission of the RBS is to enhance the quality of life for rural Americans by providing leadership in building competitive businesses including sustainable cooperatives that can prosper in the global marketplace.

The organization meets these goals by:

- Investing financial resources and providing technical assistance to businesses and cooperatives located in rural communities.
- Establishing strategic alliances and partnerships that leverage public, private, and cooperative resources to create jobs and stimulate rural economic activity.

In addition to supporting rural business, economic, and cooperative development, the Agency has become increasingly involved in renewable energy and value-added agriculture since the enactment of the 2002 Farm Bill.

== Organization ==
The Rural Business-Cooperative Service is headed by an Administrator who reports directly to the Under Secretary for Rural Development, who in turn reports to the Secretary of Agriculture.

Business & Cooperative Programs staff are headquartered in Washington, D.C., but the Agency has a presence in every state and U.S. territory. Typically there is a Business & Cooperative Program section associated with each USDA Rural Development State Office. These State Offices and their subordinate Area Office staff are responsible for most program delivery.

== Programs ==
1. Guaranteed loans. These are "lender-driven" programs, whereby business loans (generally made by commercial banks) receive a Federal loan guarantee. The guarantee is designed to support and incentivize rural business lending and to support rural job creation and retention. The primary program in this category is the Business & Industry (B&I) guaranteed loan program.
2. Direct loans. Direct loans are made to intermediary economic development groups who will in turn assist private rural business development through the re-lending of these funds. Note that the Agency does not make loans directly to for-profit businesses or individuals.
3. Grants to nonprofits & public bodies. Typically these grants are made to nonprofit economic development groups, towns, or tribes who will undertake some project in support of private rural business development.
4. Grants to private rural businesses & agricultural producers. These grants are narrowly targeted and competitively awarded in support of value-added agricultural ventures and in support of renewable energy and energy efficiency projects. Matching funds from 50 to 75% are typically required.

Until January 2018, the RBS also published the bi-monthly Rural Cooperatives magazine. Nearly all of the Agency's programs are funded annually through Congressional appropriation as part of the U.S. Federal Government budget process.
