= Under Secretary of Agriculture for Rural Development =

United States Under Secretary of Agriculture for Rural Development
- Seal of the Department of Agriculture

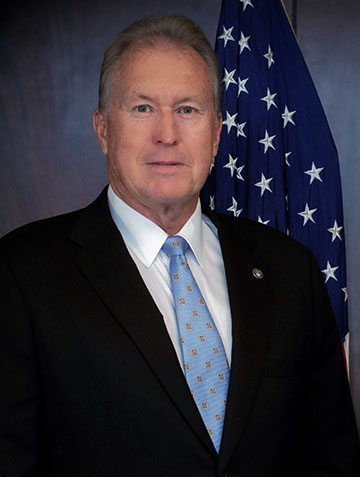
- Incumbent; Glen R. Smith since August 21, 2026
- Website: usda.gov

The under secretary for rural development (USDA(RD)) is a high-ranking official in the United States Department of Agriculture and principal advisor to the secretary of agriculture responsible for oversight of the department's rural development programs and policies.

The under secretary is appointed by the president of the United States with the consent of the United States Senate to serve at the pleasure of the president. The most recent under secretary is Glen R. Smith, who was confirmed by the Senate on August 7, 2026 and took the office on August 21, 2026.

== Overview ==
The under secretary for rural development, as head of the rural development mission area, provides assistance to rural communities in the United States. In particular, this assistance comes in three areas: business, utilities, and housing. The under secretary for rural development oversees loans, grants, and technical assistance to rural residents, communities, and businesses.

With the rank of under secretary, the USDA(RD) is a Level III position within the Executive Schedule.

== Reporting officials ==
Officials reporting to the under secretary of agriculture for rural development include:

- Deputy Under Secretary of Agriculture for Rural Development
- Administrator of the Rural Business-Cooperative Service
  - Rural Business-Cooperative Service
- Administrator of the Rural Housing Service
  - Rural Housing Service
- Administrator of the Rural Utilities Service
  - Rural Utilities Service

== Officeholders ==
Under Secretary Torres-Small was confirmed by voice vote on October 7, 2021. The previous under secretary was Lisa Mensah, who was appointed by President Barack Obama on May 8, 2014, and confirmed by the United States Senate on November 20, 2014.

Between the two, Anne Hazlett served as Assistant to the Secretary for Rural Development, from June 12, 2017, to February 7, 2019, when Hazlett joined the White House Office of National Drug Control Policy.

Denotes an Acting Under Secretary for Rural Development

No.	Portrait	Name	Took office	Left office	President serving under
1	Jill Long	Jill L. Long	1995	2001	Bill Clinton
2	Thomas Dorr	Thomas C. Dorr	2002	December 1, 2008	George W. Bush
3	Dallas P Tonsager	Dallas P. Tonsager	May 12, 2009	May 3, 2013	Barack Obama
4	Lisa Mensah	Lisa Mensah	November 20, 2014	January 2017	Barack Obama
5	Xochitl Torres Small	Xochitl Torres Small	October 13, 2021	July 17, 2023	Joe Biden
6	Basil Gooden	Basil Gooden	March 4, 2024	January 20, 2025	Joe Biden
-		Todd Lindsey	September 8, 2025	August 21, 2026	Donald Trump
7	Basil Gooden	Glen R. Smith	August 21, 2026	Incumbent	Donald Trump
