= Wilderness Land Trust =

The Wilderness Land Trust
- Formation: 1992; 34 years ago
- Type: Nonprofit
- Tax ID no.: 84-1192823
- Legal status: 501(c)(3)
- Headquarters: Helena, Montana
- Board Chair: Sarah Chase Shaw
- President: Brad Borst
- Website: https://wildernesslandtrust.org/

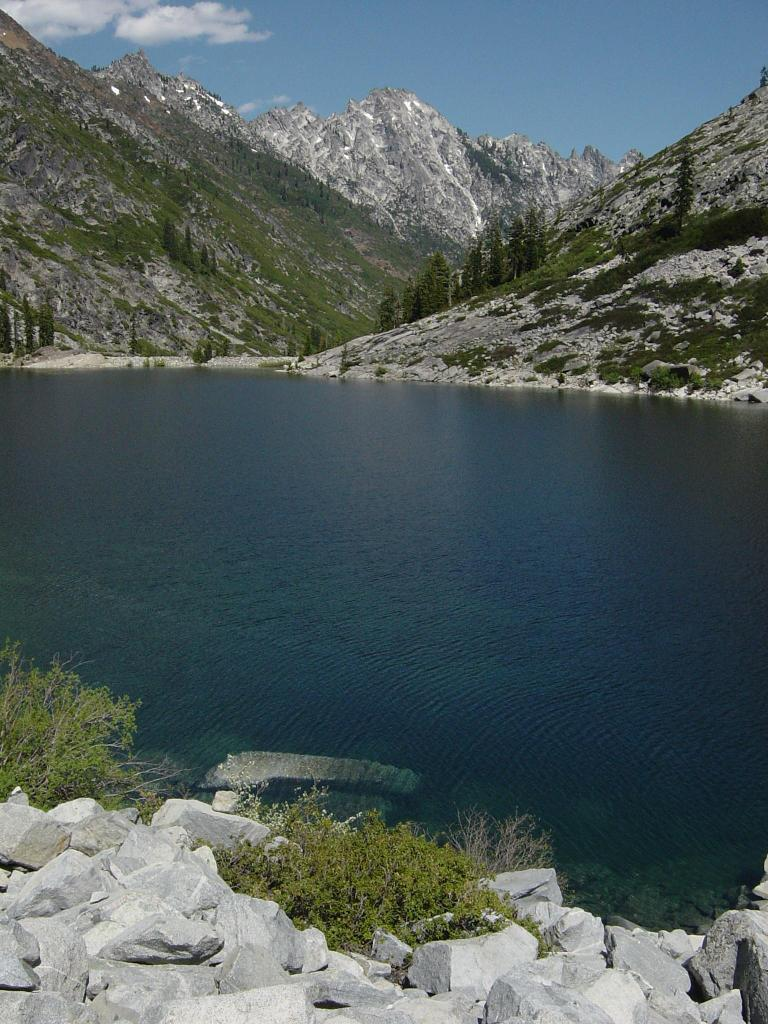
Inholding in California's Trinity Alps Wilderness

The Wilderness Land Trust is a 501(c)(3) non-profit organization based in Helena, MT, whose mission is to acquire private lands (inholdings) in current and proposed wilderness areas and transfer them to the federal government so that they will be kept forever wild as wilderness. Since the Trust was founded in 1992 it has purchased 531 private parcels, totaling nearly 56,000 acres (230 km^{2}) in 114 wilderness areas.

== Private land inside wilderness areas ==
About 400,000 acres (1,600 km^{2}) of inholdings remain within the National Wilderness Preservation System, mostly the legacy of 19th-century land disposal practices such as the General Mining Act of 1872, the Homestead Act, and Railroad Land Grants. Under the Wilderness Act of 1964, private land inside wilderness areas may be mined, logged, and otherwise developed. In some cases roads and utilities may be extended through surrounding wilderness, and houses may be constructed. By acquiring inholdings as they become available, and transferring them to public ownership, the Trust keeps these areas free from development.

=== Reasoning ===
According to the Wilderness Land Trust, the development of wilderness inholdings has the following adverse impacts:

- Fragmentation of pristine ecosystems and environmental damage such as air and water pollution, soil erosion, loss of solitude and disruption of wildlife.
- Nonconforming uses such as aircraft landings and motor vehicle intrusions.
- Degradation of the wilderness experience of visitors due to physical structures and human activities.
- Conflicts between land owners and visitors, and public outcry associated with proposed development.
- Complex land ownership patterns make managing wilderness more expensive and time-consuming for land agency officials, particularly when there is controversy.
