= Mappsville, Virginia =

- Census-designated place
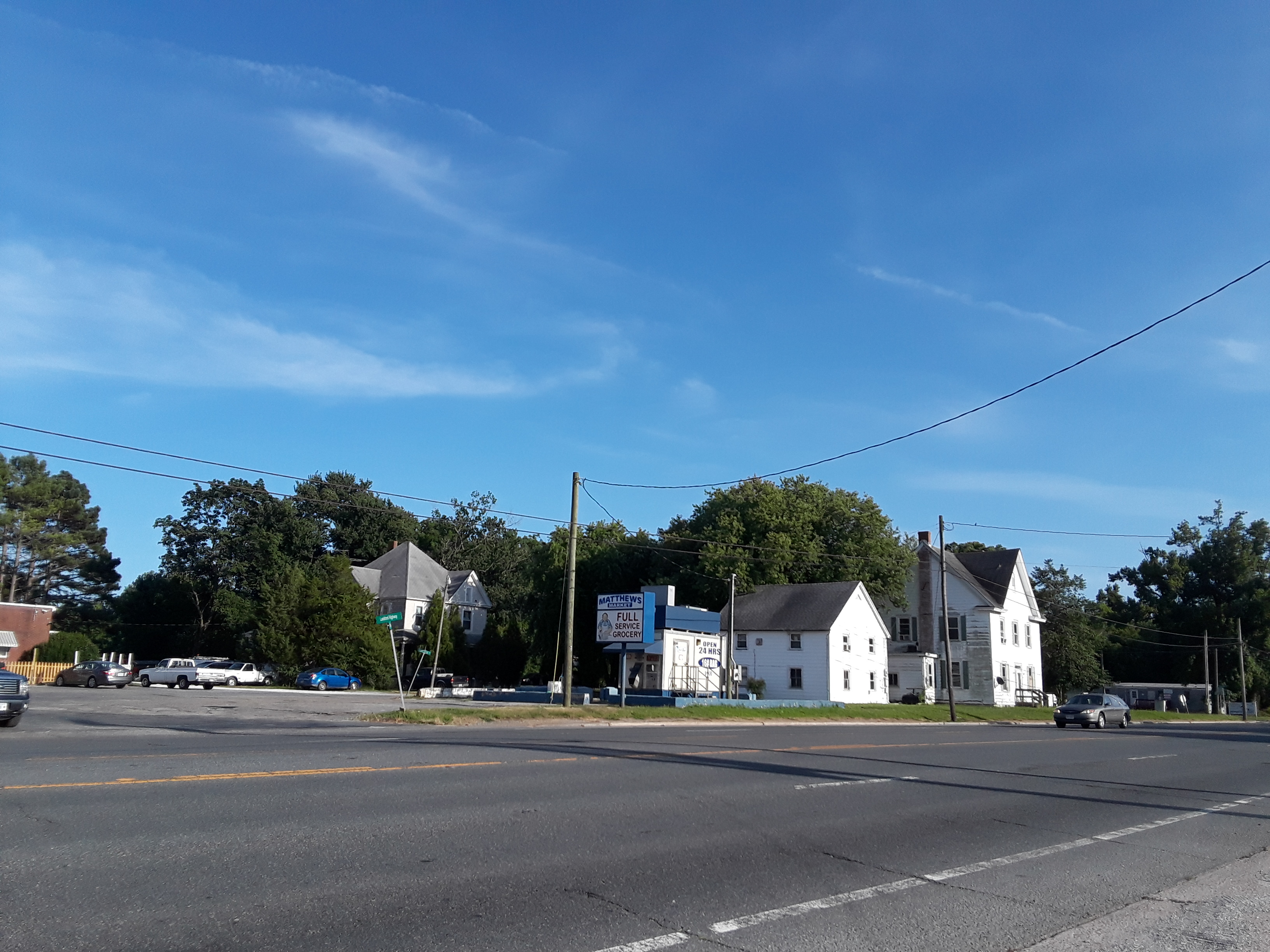
- U.S. Route 13 in Mappsville, July 2018

- Location in Accomack County and the state of Virginia.
- Coordinates: 37°34′33″N 75°45′33″W
- Country: United States
- State: Virginia
- County: Accomack
- Elevation: 46 ft (14 m)

Population (2020)
  - Total: 311
- Time zone: UTC−5 (Eastern (EST))
  - Summer (DST): UTC−4 (EDT)
- FIPS code: 51-48776
- GNIS feature ID: 2584875

Mappsville is a census-designated place (CDP) in Accomack County, Virginia, United States. Per the 2020 census, the population was 311.

Wharton Place was added to the National Register of Historic Places in 1974.

== Geography ==
The CDP lies at an elevation of 46 feet.

== Demographics ==
Historical population
Census	Pop.	Note	%±
2010	440		—
2020	311		−29.3%
U.S. Decennial Census; 2010 2020

Mappsville was first listed as a census designated place in the 2010 U.S. census.

=== 2020 census ===
Mappsville CDP, Virginia – Racial and ethnic composition Note: the US Census treats Hispanic/Latino as an ethnic category. This table excludes Latinos from the racial categories and assigns them to a separate category. Hispanics/Latinos may be of any race.
Race / Ethnicity (NH = Non-Hispanic)	Pop 2010	Pop 2020	% 2010	% 2020
White alone (NH)	49	28	11.14%	9.00%
Black or African American alone (NH)	148	116	33.64%	37.30%
Native American or Alaska Native alone (NH)	0	0	0.00%	0.00%
Asian alone (NH)	0	0	0.00%	0.00%
Pacific Islander alone (NH)	0	0	0.00%	0.00%
Some Other Race alone (NH)	11	0	2.50%	0.00%
Mixed Race or Multi-Racial (NH)	10	4	2.27%	1.29%
Hispanic or Latino (any race)	222	163	50.45%	52.41%
Total	440	311	100.00%	100.00%
