= Virginia Department of Agriculture and Consumer Services =

The Virginia Department of Agriculture and Consumer Services (VDACS) is an agency of the Commonwealth of Virginia that is responsible for promoting the economic growth and development of Virginia's agricultural sector. It also provides environmental protection services and consumer protection programs.

The department is supervised and directed by the Commissioner of Agriculture and Consumer Services. The current Commissioner is Katie Frazier, who was appointed on January 17, 2026. She is Virginia's 19th Commissioner of Agriculture and Consumer Services. Frazier graduated from Virginia Tech in 2004 and has degrees in agricultural and applied economics and political science. Frazier joined the Virginia Agribusiness Council in 2004 and served as its president from 2012-18. In 2018, she moved to Farm Credit of the Virginias.

== Organization ==
The department is under the direction and supervision of a Commissioner of Agriculture and Consumer Services, who is appointed by the Governor of Virginia. The department is located within the Governor's Secretariat of Agriculture and Forestry, which is under the direction of the Governor's Cabinet Secretary of Agriculture and Forestry.

- Commissioner of Agriculture and Consumer Services
  - Deputy Commissioner
    - Animal and Food Industry Services Division
    - Consumer Services Division
    - Marketing and Development Division
    - Commodity Services Division

== See also ==
- United States Department of Agriculture
